= National Film Award for Best Gujarati Feature Film =

Indian film award

- National award for contributions to Indian Cinema
- Description: Best Gujarati feature film of the year
- Sponsored by: National Film Development Corporation of India
- Formerly called: National Film Award for Best Feature Film in Gujarati (1960–2021)
- Rewards: Rajat Kamal (Silver Lotus); ₹2,00,000
- First award: 1960
- Most recent winner: Maaran (2024)

The National Film Award for Best Gujarati Feature Film is one of the National Film Awards given by the National Film Development Corporation of India. It was instituted in 1960 and first awarded at 8th National Film Awards. Per the Constitution of India, Gujarati language is among the languages specified in the Schedule VIII of the Constitution. Since the 70th National Film Awards, the name was changed to "Best Gujarati Feature Film".

== Winners ==
Award includes 'Rajat Kamal' (Silver Lotus) and cash prize. Following are the award winners over the years:

Awards legends
*	President's Silver Medal for Best Feature Film
*	Certificate of Merit for the Second Best Feature Film
*	Certificate of Merit for the Third Best Feature Film
*	Certificate of Merit for the Best Feature Film
*	Indicates a joint award for that year

List of films, showing the year (award ceremony), producer(s) and director(s)
Year	Film(s)	Producer(s)	Director(s)	Refs.
1960 (8th)	Mendi Rang Lagyo	Bipin Gajjar	Manhar Raskapur	
1961 (9th)	Nandanvan	Shrikumar V. Gaglani	Ganpatrao Brahmbhatt	
1962 (10th)	No Award			
1963 (11th)	Jevi Chhun Tevi	Bholanath D. Trivedi	Gajanan Mehta	
1964 (12th)	No Award			
1965 (13th)	Kasumbi No Rang	Manoobhai N. Gadhvi	G. K. Mehta	
1966 (14th)	No Award			
1967 (15th)	No Award			
1968 (16th)	No Award			
1969 (17th)	Kanku	Kantilal Rathod	Kantilal Rathod	
1970 (18th)	No Award			
1971 (19th)	No Award			
1972 (20th)	Gun Sundari No Ghar Sansar	Ramesh H. Saraiya, Jayant Malaviya and Chandulal Gnadhi	Govind Saraiya	
1973 (21st)	No Award			
1974 (22nd)	No Award			
1975 (23rd)	No Award			
1976 (24th)	No Award			
1977 (25th)	No Award			
1978 (26th)	No Award			
1979 (27th)	No Award			
1980 (28th)	No Award			
1981 (29th)	No Award			
1982 (30th)	No Award			
1983 (31st)	No Award			
1984 (32nd)	No Award			
1985 (33rd)	No Award			
1986 (34th)	No Award			
1987 (35th)	No Award			
1988 (36th)	No Award			
1989 (37th)	Percy	NFDC	Pervez Merwanji	
1990 (38th)	No Award			
1991 (39th)	No Award			
1992 (40th)	No Award			
1993 (41st)	Manvini Bhavai	Aashish Trivedi and Upendra Trivedi	Upendra Trivedi	
1994 (42nd)	No Award			
1995 (43rd)	No Award			
1996 (44th)	No Award			
1997 (45th)	No Award			
1998 (46th)	No Award			
1999 (47th)	No Award			
2000 (48th)	No Award			
2001 (49th)	No Award			
2002 (50th)	No Award			
2003 (51st)	No Award			
2004 (52nd)	No Award			
2005 (53rd)	No Award			
2006 (54th)	No Award			
2007 (55th)	No Award			
2008 (56th)	No Award			
2009 (57th)	No Award			
2010 (58th)	No Award			
2011 (59th)	No Award			
2012 (60th)	The Good Road	NFDC	Gyan Correa	
2013 (61st)	No Award			
2014 (62nd)	No Award			
2015 (63rd)	No Award			
2016 (64th)	Wrong Side Raju	CineMan Productions and Phantom Films	Mikhil Musale	
2017 (65th)	Dhh	Amruta Parande et al.	Manish Saini	
2018 (66th)	Reva	Paresh Vora	Rahul Bhole and Vinit Kanojia	
2019 (67th)	No Award			
2020 (68th)	No Award			
2021 (69th)	Chhello Show	Pan Nalin, Dheer Momaya, Siddharth Roy Kapur, and Marc Duale	Pan Nalin	
2022 (70th)	No Award			
2023 (71st)	Vash	Big Box Series Pvt Ltd and K S Entertainment LLP	Krishnadev Yagnik	
2024 (72nd)	Maaran	CineMan Productions	Abhishek Jain	
