= Wrong Side Raju =

2016 Gujarati language thriller film

- Theatrical release poster
- Directed by: Mikhil Musale
- Written by: Karan Vyas; Mikhil Musale; Niren Bhatt
- Produced by: Nayan Jain; Vikas Bahl; Vikramaditya Motwane; Madhu Mantena; Anurag Kashyap
- Starring: Pratik Gandhi; Kimberley Louisa McBeath; Asif Basra; Kavi Shastri; Hetal Puniwala; Siddharth Randeria; Ragi Jani
- Cinematography: Tribhuvan Babu Sadineni
- Edited by: Cheragh Todiwala
- Music by: Sachin–Jigar
- Production companies: CineMan Productions; Phantom Films
- Distributed by: CineMan Productions; Phantom Films; Shagun Entertainment (Overseas Distribution)
- Release date: 9 September 2016
- Running time: 130 minutes
- Country: India
- Language: Gujarati

Wrong Side Raju (Stylized Wrong Side રાજુ) is a 2016 Indian Gujarati thriller drama film directed by Mikhil Musale. Starring Pratik Gandhi, Kimberley Louisa McBeath, and Asif Basra, it is inspired by a hit and run in Ahmedabad in 2013. The film won National Film Award for Best Feature Film in Gujarati at the 64th National Film Awards.

== Plot ==
The film begins with a checkpoint on the outskirts of Ahmedabad. Two constables are investigating an elderly man and a speeding car knocks out the checkpoint, killing constables and seriously injuring the man. Some time later, Raju Bambani (Pratik Gandhi) arrives at the scene, stunned.

Raju is a driver by day and bootlegger by night and aims to start his own travel agency with his mentor, Patil (Ragi Jani). Raju is employed by the former lawyer and industrialist Amitabh Shah (Asif Basra) and drives around his son, Tanmay (Kavi Shastri). Raju's sister teaches Tanmay's friend, Shaily (Kimberley Louisa McBeath), Garba. Raju acts as a guide for her and shows her around in the city and falls in love with her. While driving Tanmay around, Raju also learns about sour relationship between Tanmay and his father and Tanmay's problem with his business partner, Mark. When Tanmay finds out about Raju's growing closeness with Shaily, he pulls out of his guarantee for the loan that Raju required for his travel agency. During Navratri, Shaily goes to Garba with Raju and learning about this Tanmay asks Shaily to drive away with him and if she doesn't comply he threatens that he'll ruin Raju's future. Shaily reluctantly complies, Raju follows them on his scooter. The car eventually meets the accident and Raju arrives at the scene some time later.

The next day, the police begins the investigation in the case and finds Raju's scooter near the scene of the accident, including the illegal liquor bottles he's carrying. The police threatens to file a case against Raju for Prevention of Anti-Social Activities (PASA), unless he co-operates in hit and run case, but Raju claims ignorance about the event as he arrived at the scene late. The police inspector asks for a bribe of ₹15 lakhs to ignore PASA case against him. Raju also finds out that the elderly man injured during the accident is one of his regular customers, Pritam Parikh (Kenneth Desai). Raju and Patil manage to gather bribe amount to get rid of PASA case against him. During the investigation, police find CCTV footage, showing Tanmay driving the car minutes before the accident. Amitabh Shah offers the bribe of 2 crores to frame Raju instead for the crime, he also succumbs to threats allegedly from Tanmay's business partner, Mark and gives him ₹50 million. When the case reaches the court, Pritam Parikh's son Parth Parikh agrees to fight the case for Raju. Parth highlights the shoddy investigation and conspiracy to frame Raju. The court dismisses chargesheet against Raju and asks the police to reinvestigate the case and file the chargesheet again, summoning Tanmay, who is missing since the accident.

After the acquittal, Raju confides in Parth about the events of the night. Raju reveals that when he reached the site of the accident, it was in fact Shaily who was driving the car and Tanmay had died during the car crash. To save Shaily, she's asked to leave the country; they get rid of Tanmay's body and threaten his father as Mark to create the impression that he has absconded. Raju defends himself saying he took the actions to save himself. Raju reunites with Shaily in Paris.

== Cast ==
- Pratik Gandhi as Raju Bambani
- Kimberley Louisa McBeath as Shaily Asher
- Asif Basra as Amitabh Shah
- Kavi Shastri as Tanmay Shah
- Hetal Puniwala as Parth Parikh
- Ragi Jani as Patil
- Makarand Shukla as Abhijat Shah
- Alok Gagdekar as Makvana
- Jayesh More as Inspector Gohil
- Siddharth Randeria as Mehta
- Kenneth Desai as Pritam Parikh

== Production ==
=== Development ===
The film is inspired by a hit and run case which happened in Ahmedabad in 2013. After finishing the script in 2015, CineMan Productions approached Phantom Films. In February 2016, Abhishek Jain announced that his production house Cineman Productions will co-produce three Gujarati films with Phantom Films, which would be directed by Mikhil Musale, a co-founder of CineMan Productions. Musale had earlier worked as an assistant director to Jain in Kevi Rite Jaish and Bey Yaar.

The initial draft of the film was written by Musale and Karan Vyas, later Niren Bhatt was hired, who had earlier worked with CineMan's previous film, Bey Yaar. The production of the film started in February 2016. On 13 August 2016, the film was officially announced and titled Wrong Side Raju.

=== Filming ===
The film is set and shot in Ahmedabad and was shot in 60 locations. Parts of the film were shot in H.L. College of Commerce and Gujarat National Law University.

== Soundtrack ==
Wrong Side Raju

Soundtrack album by Sachin–Jigar
- Released: 29 August 2016
- Genre: Feature film soundtrack
- Length: 25:46
- Label: Zee Music Gujarati

Sachin–Jigar chronology
| A Flying Jatt (2016) | Wrong Side Raju (2016) | Carry On Kesar (2016) |

Sachin–Jigar composed the music for the film and lyrics were written by Niren Bhatt. The first song of the film, Satrangi Re was released on 23 August 2016 on Red FM 93.5. The song was sung by Arijit Singh, the first Gujarati song sung by him. The song received positive reviews and amassed more than a million views on YouTube within 24 hours. When Sachin–Jigar approached Vishal Dadlani he said it was his ambition to sing a song in all Indian languages and agreed to sing for the movie. The soundtrack of the film was released on 29 August 2016.

Music review website Milliblog! gave a mixed review and called the album "functional".

Track list
| No. | Title | Singer(s) | Length |
|---|---|---|---|
| 1. | "Satrangi Re" | Arijit Singh, Dawn Cordo | 3:39 |
| 2. | "Gori Radha ne Kalo Kaan" | Divya Kumar | 5:08 |
| 3. | "Zindabad Re" | Vishal Dadlani | 3:34 |
| 4. | "Katputhla" | Keerthi Sagathia, Jasleen Royal | 4:23 |
| 5. | "Amdavad Re" | Vishal Dadlani | 3:36 |
| 6. | "Gori Radha ne Kalo Kaan" | Kirtidan Gadhvi | 5:26 |

== Release ==
The film was released on 9 September 2016 in India. The film was subsequently released in United States on 16 September 2016, Canada on 6 November 2016 and Australia on 11 November 2016 as limited release by Shagun Entertainment and United Kingdom on 12 November 2016. The film was shown at The Vancouver International South Asian Film Festival.

== Reception ==
=== Critical reception ===
The Times of India reviewed positively saying, "Overall, a great effort by the entire team and it seems that the future of Gujarati cinema surely lies in the hands of those who are ready to break away from the mould and make content driven films." BuddyBits also reviewed positively saying it to be the right turn of Gujarati cinema. Livemint gave a mixed review said, "Wrong Side Raju is a first in Gujarati cinema in many ways, but it has to up its game to make its presence felt among the vibrant, new regional cinemas of the country." The Hindu reviewed it negatively and said, "The Phantom backing might make cinema buffs beyond Gujarat curious about the film, but barring a few good songs by Sachin-Jigar, there is not much more to make you curious enough to watch it."

== Awards ==
| Year | Award | Category | Recipients | Result | Ref. |
|---|---|---|---|---|---|
| 2017 | 64th National Film Awards | Best Feature Film in Gujarati | Mikhil Musale & CineMan Productions | Won | |
| 2017 | 16th Annual Transmedia Gujarati Screen and Stage awards | Best Film | Wrong Side Raju | Won | |
| 2017 | 16th Annual Transmedia Gujarati Screen and Stage awards | Best Director | Mikhil Musale | Won | |
| 2017 | 16th Annual Transmedia Gujarati Screen and Stage awards | Best Actor | Pratik Gandhi | Nominated | |
| 2017 | 16th Annual Transmedia Gujarati Screen and Stage awards | Best Editor | Cheragh Todiwala | Won | |
