= Abhinay Banker =

Indian actor

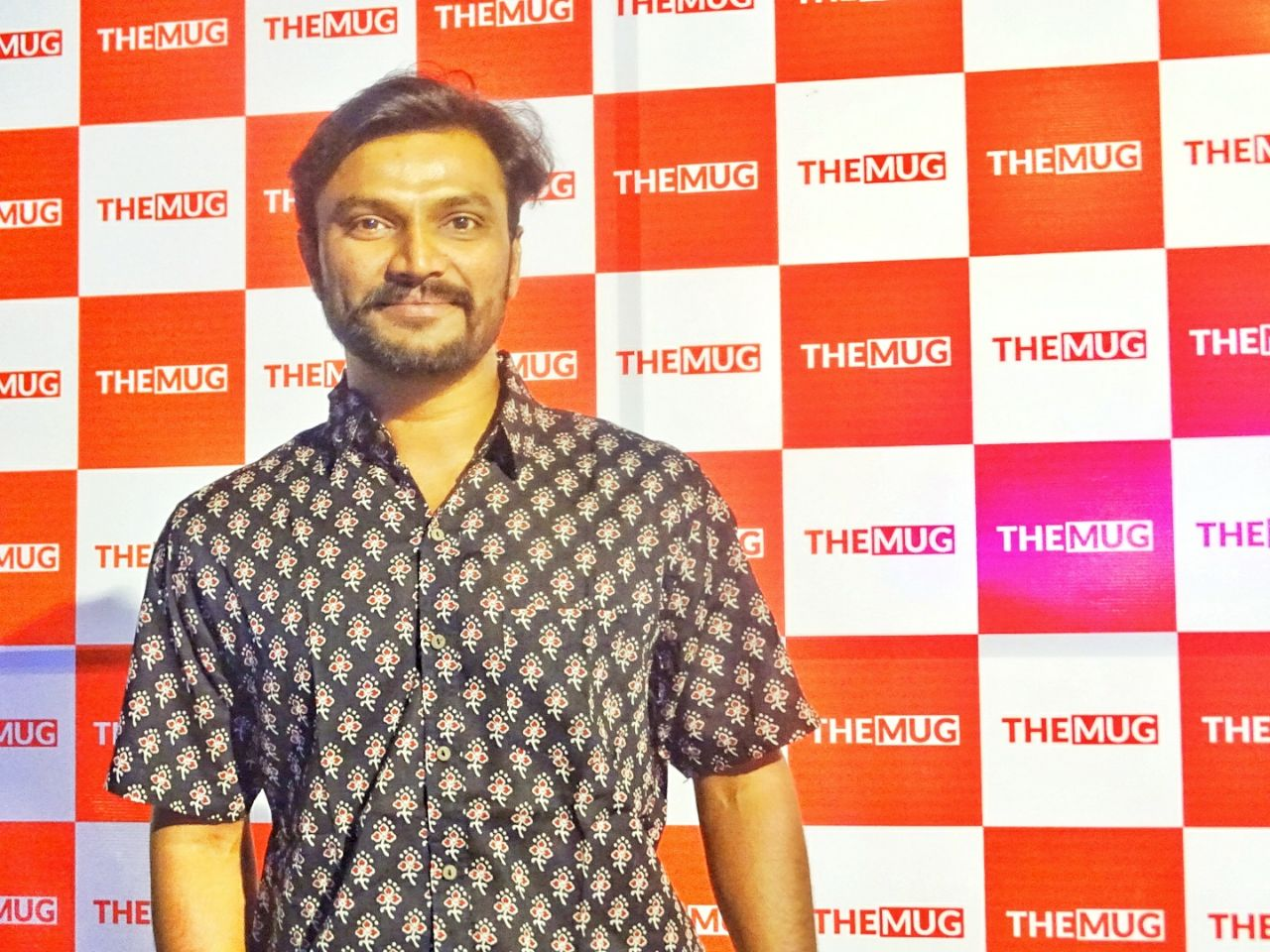
- Abhinay Banker at The Mug event
- Born: Ahmedabad, Gujarat, India
- Education: Bachelor of Performing Arts in Theatre; Bachelor of Commerce; Gujarat University
- Occupations: Actor, Director, Screenwriter, Playwright
- Years active: 2006–present
- Organization: Aarambh Arts Academy

Abhinay Banker (Gujarati: અભિનય બેન્કર, Hindi: अभिनय बेंकर, born on 14 September) is an actor, director, and writer who works in Gujarati cinema and theatre. After several theatre performances in his early career, he received recognition for his performance in Gujarati play Welcome Zindagi (2010), written and directed by Saumya Joshi, which has been performed over 650 times worldwide. He acted in Gujarati film Kevi Rite Jaish (2012).

== Early life ==
Banker is born in Ahmedabad, Gujarat, India in a Gujarati Hindu family. During his studies, he worked as a freelance photo journalist for several news agencies from 2002 to 2005. He completed his Bachelor of Performing Arts in theatre from Gujarat University in April 2009 and received gold medal. In 2014, he was appointed as a contributing faculty cum mentor at School of liberal studies, Pandit Deendayal Petroleum University (PDPU).

== Career ==
Abhinay Banker has acted in number of plays. His debuted in 2005 in a play, Natsamrat. In 2006, he became a theatre trainer and practitioner. He served as the head of the drama department at Darpana Academy of Performing Arts during 2012–2015. He is a founder-member of Actor's Theatre Ahmadabad, a group of theatre artist, and is a founder director of Aarambh Arts Academy.

In 2007, he acted as Anand in Mallika Sarabhai's Unsuni (Unheard Voices) which is an adaptation of former IAS officer Harsh Mander's novel of the same name. Despite facing the heat from Censor Board, it completed more than 150 performances.

He was appreciated by audience as a director-actor for his musical demonstration, based on Amrita Pritam's life, Main Tenu Phir Milangi (2011). Her love tale is about aside from others, as it talks about the purest unconditional love.

When Urdu writer Saadat Hasan Manto left Mumbai to visit Delhi, he said "Main khud ek chalta phirta Bambai hun" (I myself am a travelling Mumbai), to explain his connection to the city. Thus one of his plays has been named as Chalta Phirta Bambai (2012). In it, three joined stories unobtrusively depict the truth of life and all the while challenge the thought of innocence, love, ethics, morality, virtuousness and self-respect, but then ends in the nakedness and blatancy existent in our general public.

Banker has acted in the play, Akoopar (2013), based on the novel by Dhruv Bhatt. The play focuses on the existence of the Maldharis (animal breeders), who live within the Gir forest, the last home of the Asiatic lion. Directed by Aditi Desai, daughter of the theatre artiste late Jaswant Thakar, the play has been performed at the Bharat Rang Mahotsav at National School of Drama (NSD) Delhi. It has been additionally announced as the best play at Transmedia awards 2013.

The play Koi Pan Ek Phool Nu Naam Bolo To (Name any one flower) (2014) is a psychological murder mystery. It had been at first written with the aid of Gujarati writer Madhu Rye nearly five decades ago. In 1969, Kailash Pandya, who became the first head of the drama department of Darpana Academy of Performing Arts, directed the play. Forty-five years later, Abhinay Banker and his group performed it on the same stage. It had been also nominated for best drama production at 14th Transmedia Gujarati Screen & Stage Awards.

Director, actor and writer of the play Haji Ek Varta (2014), Abhinay Banker, portrayed it as a play that has the strings of immaculate humorousness, warmth and joy weaved suitably. It is a progression of six distinctive stories falling in a steady progression penned by various Gujarati writers. After its debut at the National Centre for the Performing Arts's (India) Gujarati Vasant Natyotsav 2014, the play was performed in Habitat Conclave, Ashapalli Festival at Ahmadabad in early 2016.

Banker is playing lead role in Aditi Desai's play Samudramanthan (2016). The story, delineating the battle for good over malice, is an anecdotal thought on the lives of Gujarati group of Kharwas (who live by the ocean) enlivened by an old book of the same name. It is genesis of a Nakhuda, the term utilized for a captain of the boat in Kharwas and demonstrates the agitating in the mid ocean that draws out all the nine rasa of human emotions. The play had been performed in19th Bharat Rang Mahotsav 2017 at National School of Drama.

Happy Journey (2016), a play written and directed by Abhinay Banker for H L Institute of Commerce, Ahmedabad University, demonstrated the life of today's youth as an understudy seeking after her interests and who experiences thick and diminishes of being in a relationship leading her into melancholy and how benevolently leaves it with the well-built backing of her father. It won first prize, received numerous awards in various categories as well as lifted a standout amongst the most pined for trophies in the field of theatre by INT (Indian National Theatre).

In 2022, Abhinay Banker was selected as the curator for Abhivyakti, an arts project including visual arts, music, dance and theatre. It invites artists across the country to participate in this annual project with mentoring by theatre personality Saumya Joshi.

== Theater credits ==
Year	Title	Role	Credited as	Notes	Ref(s)
2007	Unsuni	Anand	Actor	The act had been demonstrated more than 150 performances throughout the nation	
2007	Hamlet-o-lear	Edger	Actor	National School of Drama (Intensive acting workshop production)	
2007	Aswastthama	Aswastthama	Actor	A play by Madyu Rye based on the character of Mahabharata	
2008	Phèdre in India	Théramène	Actor	Have been performed at 10th Bharat Rang Mahotsav in the year of 2008 as well as at French Embassy (New Delhi, India) in Residence programme	
2009	Khamoshiyaan	–	Director	A play based on the scars suffered from riots – a collage of Gulzar's literary creations on stage at 'Festival of non-violence through arts'	
2009	Khuda Hafiz	–	Director	A play based on the scars suffered from riots – a collage of Gulzar's literary creations on stage at 'Festival of non-violence through arts'	
2009	Ahmedabad ki aurat bhali – Ramkali	Narrator	Actor	An adaptation of Bertolt Brecht's popular play 'The good woman of Setzuan' in 34th Vikram Sarabhai International Art Festival	
2010	Welcome Zindagi	Vivek Ganatra	Actor	More than 550 shows worldwide & Abhinay Banker was nominated for best supporting actor at Transmedia Awards 2011 as well as performed at National School of Drama (NSD) Delhi '8th during Theater Olympics' in 2018	
2011	Main Tenu Phir Milangi	Sahir Ludhianvi	Actor, director	Musical play based on Amrita Pritam's life containing compositions of her poetry	
2012	Chalta Phirta Bambai	–	Director, writer	Based on three plays by Saadat Hassan Manto, a writer of British-Indian Pakistani Origin	
2012	Kasturba	Mahatma Gandhi	Actor	Awarded as best actor at 13th Transmedia Gujarati Screen & Stage Awards and the play has also been dramatized at AIANA's Chaalo Gujarat event at Edison, New Jersey	
2013	Akoopar	Nayak – Painter	Actor	Announced as the best play at Transmedia awards for the year 2013 & also have been performed at the Bharat Rang Mahotsav at National School of Drama (NSD) Delhi	
2014	Kadak Badshahi	Ahmed Shah	Actor	Celebrated six hundred years of Ahmadabad city	
2014	Koi Pan Ek Phool Nu Naam Bolo To	Keshav Thaker	Actor, director	Nominated for more than 7 categories at 14th Transmedia Gujarati Screen & Stage Awards along with nomination for best drama production	
2014	Haji Ek Varta	Marathi Servant	Actor, director, writer	Performed at the National Center for Performing Art's Gujarati Vasant Natyo Utsav 2014 as well as at the Habitat Conclave, Ashapalli Festival	
2015	Unbroken Wings	-	Director	Won number of awards at the INT 2015 (Indian National Theatre) including the best drama, best director, best performer (male & female) and the best music	
2016	Samudra Manthan	Mithu	Actor	Performed in19th Bharat Rang Mahotsav 2017 at National School of Drama; the play which demonstrates the agitating in the mid ocean that draws out all the 9 ras of human emotions	
2016	Happy Journey	–	Director, writer	Won the 1st prize and lifted one of the most coveted trophies in the field of Theatre by INT (Indian National Theatre)	
2017	Saat Teri Ekvees	–	Writer	An act, produced by Manhar Gadhia and performed by Ami Trivedi, about the problems during Indian marriage & tradition. Which also got translated in Hindi language titled as Womanlogues.	
2017	Pune Highway (Dramatised reading)	–	Director	A playwright development programme in association with British Council, written by Rahul da Cunha, having faces from all mainstream mediums – theatre, television and films. It has been managed by Rajat Kapur and Shernaz Patel.	
2018	Jaane Woh Kaise Log The	–	Director, writer	A theater production premiered at Sunday to Sunday Theatre Festival organised by Darpana Academy of Performing Arts	

== Filmography ==
Year	Title	Role	Field	Credited as	Director	Ref(s)
2012	Kevi Rite Jaish	Raheel	Gujarati Feature Film	Actor, Casting director, Script associate	Abhishek Jain	
2013	Bhinti Maage – Behind the Wall	Atul	Marathi Film (Short fiction)	Actor	Vishwesh Kolwalkar	
2017	Shubhaarambh	–	Gujarati Feature Film	Writer (Screenplay and Dialogues)	Amit Barot	
2017	Dhantya Open	Murlee Lalvani	Gujarati Feature Film	Actor	Ajay Phansekar	
2017	Colorbaaj	Inspector Girish Ramavat	Gujarati Feature Film	Actor	Zanane Rajsingh	
2018	Mijaaj	VP	Gujarati Feature Film	Actor	Tapan Vyas	
2018	Reva	Bittu-Banga	Gujarati Feature Film	Actor	Rahul bhole & Vinit Kanojia	
2018	Manto	Shoe Shop Owner	Hindi Feature Film	Actor	Nandita Das	
2021	Mara Pappa Superhero	Bhavlo	Gujarati Feature Film	Actor	Darshan Ashwin Trivedi	
2022	Ithaar	Ishaan	Web Series	Actor	Sahil Gada	
2025	Victor 303	PI Manish	Gujarati Feature Film	Actor	Swapnil Mehta	
2025	Shubhchintak		Gujarati Feature Film	Actor	Nisarg Vaidya	
2026	Kadaknath	Abhaysinh Damor	Gujarati Feature Film	Actor	Kaushik Garasiya	
2026	Maaran		Gujarati Feature Film	Actor	Abhishek Jain	
