= Madhu Mantena =

Indian film producer (born 1975)

- Born: 8 May 1975 (age 51); Hyderabad, Telangana, India
- Occupations: Entrepreneur; Film producer Advertiser
- Years active: 2002–present
- Spouses: Masaba Gupta (m. 2015; div. 2019); Ira Trivedi (m. 2023)
- Partner: Nandana Sen (2002–2013)
- Relatives: Ram Gopal Varma (cousin)
- Awards: National Film Award; Limca Book of Records

Madhu Varma Mantena (born 8 May 1975) is an Indian film producer and entrepreneur involved in the production and distribution of films across Hindi, Telugu, and Bengali cinema.

== Career ==
Mantena founded a music label as a teenager, which he then sold to Supreme Recording Company. He then went on to set up Adlabs’ International Operations, under the aegis of Manmohan Shetty, and was the head of Saregama Films.

In 2008, Mantena co-produced Ghajini with Allu Aravind, which became the highest-grossing Indian film of that year. In 2010, he produced the political thrillers Rakht Charitra and Rann and the Bengali drama Autograph.

In 2011, Mantena co-founded Phantom Films with Anurag Kashyap, Vikas Bahl, and Vikramaditya Motwane. The company produced a number of films including such as Queen which won the National Film Award for Best Feature Film in Hindi in 2014, Bombay Velvet (2015), Ugly (2015) which was screened in the Directors' Fortnight section at the 2013 Cannes Film Festival and the New York Indian Film Festival. The 2016 film Raman Raghav 2.0 was screened at the Cannes Directors' Fortnight. In 2019, Super 30 was the last film produced by Phantom Films; the company was subsequently disbanded. However, in 2022, Mantena and Sheetal Talwar bought the company and revived it as Phantom Studios.

He is the founder and chief creative officer of the marketing company Big Bang Media Private Limited. In April 2023, it was announced that Big Bang Media Ventures would be the exclusive marketing and commercial partner to the Hockey India League.

== Personal life ==
Mantena was in a relationship with actress Nandana Sen for over a decade. He married fashion designer and actress Masaba Gupta in 2015 in a civil ceremony in Mumbai. In late 2018 the couple announced that they were on a trial separation. The couple officially got divorced in September 2019. Mantena married author and yoga teacher Ira Trivedi on 11 June 2023 in a traditional Hindu ceremony in Mumbai, which was attended by close family and friends.

== Filmography ==
As Producer

Year	Title	Language
2003	Karthik	Telugu
2008	Ghajini	Hindi
2010	Rann	Hindi
2010	Autograph	Bengali
2010	Rakta Charitra	Telugu; Hindi
2010	Rakta Charitra 2	Telugu; Hindi
2010	Jhootha Hi Sahi	Hindi
2011	Mausam	Hindi
2013	Lootera	Hindi
2014	Hasee Toh Phasee	Hindi
2014	Queen	Hindi
2014	Ugly	Hindi
2015	NH10	Hindi
2015	Hunterrr	Hindi
2015	Bombay Velvet	Hindi
2015	Shaandaar	Hindi
2015	Masaan	Hindi
2016	Udta Punjab	Hindi
2016	Raman Raghav 2.0	Hindi
2016	Wrong Side Raju	Gujarati
2017	Trapped	Hindi
2018	Mukkabaaz	Hindi
2018	High Jack	Hindi
2018	Bhavesh Joshi Superhero	Hindi
2018	Youngraad	Marathi
2018	Manmarziyaan	Hindi
2019	Super 30	Hindi
2025	Loveyapa	Hindi

== Awards ==
Year	Film	Award	Category	Result
2008	Ghajini	International Indian Film Academy	Best Film	Nominated
2015	Ugly	Screen Award	Best Film	Nominated
2015	Queen	62nd National Film Awards	Best Feature Film in Hindi	Won
2015	Queen	Filmfare Award	Best Film	Won
2015	Queen	IIFA Award	Best Movie	Won
2015	Masaan	63rd National Film Awards	Indira Gandhi Award for Best Debut Film of a Director	Won
2016	Wrong Side Raju	64th National Film Awards	Best Feature Film in Gujarati	Won
