= Vitthal Teedi =

Indian Gujarati-language drama webseries

- વિઠ્ઠલ તીડી
- Genre: Drama
- Based on: Vitthal Teedi by Mukesh Sojitra
- Written by: Bhargav Purohit
- Directed by: Abhishek Jain
- Starring: Pratik Gandhi; Ragi Jani; Prashant Barot; Prem Gadhvi; Brinda Trivedi; Jagjeetsinh Vadher
- Composers: Kedar & Bhargav
- Country of origin: India
- Original language: Gujarati
- No. of seasons: 1
- No. of episodes: 6

Production
- Producers: Nayan Jain; Abhishek Jain; Amit Desai; Suryadeep Basiya
- Cinematography: Tapan Vyas
- Editors: Harsh Anandani; Hiren Chitroda
- Running time: 24–33 minutes
- Production company: CineMan Productions

Original release
- Network: OHO Gujarati
- Release: 7 May 2021

Vitthal Teedi (Gujarati: વિઠ્ઠલ તીડી) is an Indian Gujarati-language drama web-series directed by Abhishek Jain. It is streamed on OHO Gujarati and stars Pratik Gandhi as the protagonist Vitthal Teedi. The first season, stylized as Chapter 1, was released on 7 May 2021. It was reviewed positively for performance, direction, production, music and script.

== Premise ==
Vitthal Tripathi is portrayed as a person from humble origins who has exceptional skill with playing cards, which he uses to enter the big leagues and experience city life.

== Cast ==
- Pratik Gandhi as Vitthal Tripathi/Vitthal Teedi
- Ragi Jani as Tribhuvandas Tripathi
- Prashant Barot as Dasha Bapu
- Prem Gadhvi as Kanu Datti
- Brinda Trivedi as Vandana Tripathi
- Jagjeetsinh Vadher as Jaglo
- Shraddha Dangar as Manisha
- Vishal Thakkar as Young Vitthal Tripathi
- Bhavya Sirohi as Young Vandana Tripathi

== Episodes ==
=== Chapter 1 ===
No.	Title	Directed by	Written by	Original release date
1	"Child's Play"; Transliteration: "Chhokarmat" (Gujarati: છોકરમત)	Abhishek Jain	Bhargav Purohit	7 May 2021
Vitthal has no interest in school; when asked to say the number 'three' in Gujarati, he pronounces it as "teddi" in the style of local card players. This joke spreads through the small village, and everyone calls him Vitthal Teedi. One morning Vitthal and his elder sister are beaten and scolded by the new gymnastics teacher for being late. His sister explains that she had to complete household chores before school due to their mother's recent death. When the teacher makes fun of Vitthal's father, Vitthal hits the teacher with a stone in his hand. His father, a temple priest, withdraws Vitthal from school without a scolding, solidifying the bond between them.
2	"The Only Play"; Transliteration: "Ek Ramat" (Gujarati: એક રમત)	Abhishek Jain	Bhargav Purohit	7 May 2021
Years have passed and Vitthal now knows how to read his opponents, winning every card game that he plays with his friends under a banyan tree, (Note: The banyan tree is the national tree of India and numerous religious figures are said to have gained enlightenment while meditating under them.) and uses his gambling winnings to help his family. Some appreciate his talent while others are envious. Vitthal plans to buy a leather jacket to impress his girlfriend, but when he learns that she is to marry someone from a different caste he instead asks the tailor to make a dress for his sister. Vitthal refrains from card playing during Shraavana (a Hindu holy month of fasting), when he devotes himself to Shiva.
3	"Euphoric"; Transliteration: "Chanak" (Gujarati: ચાનક)	Abhishek Jain	Bhargav Purohit	7 May 2021
Vitthal's older brother, a software engineer living in Ahmedabad, invites Vitthal and their father to meet a young woman he wants to marry. Their father refuses, saying that the village is his family. A gathering is arranged, offering food to every villager, with excuses made to cover for the brother's absence. After the gathering, Vitthal's father tells him that he may be 'Teedi' for the whole world, but that he is the ace of spaces for him. After many requests, Vitthal's father visits the older son in Ahmedabad and asks him to arrange a job for uneducated Vitthal, but the brother refuses. Vitthal's father returns to the village and goes to bed without dinner.
4	"Unforeseen"; Transliteration: "Achanak" (Gujarati: અચાનક)	Abhishek Jain	Bhargav Purohit	7 May 2021
Vitthal is invited to gamble in a larger village, where he wins enough money to provide a lavish wedding for his sister. A police officer raids the gambling hall; Vitthal saves rival Kanu Datti, and demands ₹1,500 in restitution for the money he had to leave behind. Later, Vitthal wins a large sum from an old man who is desperate to pay an increased dowry; moved to tears, Vitthal returns the money. Vitthal arranges a modest wedding for his sister and begs the groom to take care of her. His sister asks Vitthal to get a steady job and marry, and he agrees as it is the only thing she's ever asked of him. Vitthal's brother does not attend the wedding, worsening their father's condition.
5	"Undaunted"; Transliteration: "Nirdhar" (Gujarati: નિર્ધાર)	Abhishek Jain	Bhargav Purohit	7 May 2021
Vitthal take care of the Shiva Temple and decides to open a pan shop in the village. However, he is regularly visited by people who insist he return to gambling, and he asks the gambling hall's leader to stop this. Tragedy strikes one night, when he cries in front of his father that he roams around doing nothing and doesn't feed his family. Vitthal discovers that his father is dead the next morning. His elder brother and sister insist that he go with them to live his remaining life there, but Vitthal declines. He donates his entire savings to a Bhajan Mandli in the name of his late father. Contemplating his future, Vitthal sleeps wholeheartedly.
6	"Downpour"; Transliteration: "Anaradhar" (Gujarati: અનરાધાર)	Abhishek Jain	Bhargav Purohit	7 May 2021
Vitthal's sister calls him to the hospital when her husband is suffering from brain haemmorrhage. A doctor informs them that ₹50,000 is needed for a life-saving operation. Vitthal goes to Kanu, who returns the ₹1,500 owed him and suggests he use it to enter a big-stakes game. Vitthal refuses until he realizes the turmoil his sister is suffering. He systematically determines how to read his opponents except for one, the champion, who challenges him to a final winner-takes-all match. Vitthal decides to give his luck a chance. The champion draws a king, queen and ace, but Vitthal gets three 'teedies', which is a higher rank in the teen patti game, and leaves with more than enough money for his brother-in-law's operation.

== Production ==
The show is based on an eponymous Gujarati short story by Mukesh Sojitra. The story is set in the Saurashtra region of Gujarat in the 1980s. The series was shot in various villages in Gir and in Ahmedabad. The six episodes of Chapter 1 were shot in 16 days in January 2021.

The shooting of Chapter 2 started in July 2023.

== Soundtrack ==
=== Chapter 1 ===
Traditional lyrics (specifically, Chhand, used in the song) for "Vitthal Vitthal" are credited to Dula Bhaya Kag. Rolling Stone India rated the soundtrack positively, calling it an "enchanting folk soundtrack".

Vitthal Teedi

Soundtrack album by Kedar & Bhargav
- Released: 4 May 2021
- Recorded: 2021
- Genre: Television soundtrack
- Length: 11:46
- Language: Gujarati
- Producer: Innovantage Technologies LLP
External audio
- Official Audio Jukebox on YouTube

All music is composed by Kedar & Bhargav.

Track listing
No.	Title	Lyrics	Singer(s)	Length
1.	"Beni Ho"	Bhargav Purohit	Geetaben Rabari	2:46
2.	"Jani Jani"	Bhargav Purohit	Jigardan Gadhavi	2:45
3.	"Sadho"	Bhargav Purohit	Bhargav Purohit	3:47
4.	"Vitthal Vitthal"	Bhargav Purohit	Aditya Gadhvi	2:28
Total length:				11:46

== Release ==
The trailer was released on 1 May 2021. All episodes of the Chapter 1 were released on OHO Gujarati, a Gujarati streaming platform, on 7 May 2021.

== Reception ==
The series received positive reviews. Koimoi rated it 4 out of 5 stars saying, "Vitthal Teedi has all the elements to become a complete package, and the makers have to realise that. You should give it a try because the cast won’t let you get bored for a single moment." Keyur Seta of Cinestaan reviewed it three out of four starts. Vishal Verma of Glamsham also praised performances, production and direction. Subhash K. Jha of SpotboyE also rated it three out of five stars.
