= Vishvesh Parmar =

Vishvesh Parmar (વિશ્વેશ પરમાર)

Background information
- Born: 28 November 1983 (age 42); Anand, Gujarat, India
- Genres: Rock, Bollywood, grunge rock,
- Occupations: Singer, composer, music producer, sound engineer,
- Instruments: Vocals, indian flute, guitar, synthesiser, piano
- Years active: 2009–present

Vishvesh Parmar is an Indian playback singer/ recording artist and composer, who works for Bollywood movies, He is known for his composition Pankhida for the urban Gujarati Film, Kevi Rite Jaish. He was the recipient of the Binani Big Gujarati award for Most Entertaining Song in 2012.

== Early life ==
Vishvesh Parmar was born in Anand (the Milk City of India) on 28 November 1983 and grew up in Nadiad, both towns are in the Gujarat state. He attended school at St. Mary's High School, Nadiad and in August 2001, moved within the state to Vallabh Vidyanagar to pursue his engineering degree at A.D Patel Institute of Technology.

== Career ==
In February 2007, he moved to Ahmadabad, Gujarat where he began giving solo performances on weekends at local cafes. In July 2008 Vishvesh moved to Mumbai to study sound engineering and recording arts, and went on to work as a sound engineer in the Bollywood film industry. In 2012 he made his debut as a composer for the film 'Kevi Rite Jaish' with the song 'Pankhida' and 'Kharekhar'.

== Pankhida reception ==
Pankhida was Vishvesh Parmar's first composition, and became very popular within just a few hours of its release. After the song was made available for download (26 May 2012), it had over 100,000 downloads in the first four days, from the official website alone. It was declared a 'viral hit' by leading newspapers.

== Filmography ==
Year	Title	Note
2010	Rann	Background Music Mixing Engineer
2010	Phoonk 2	Background Music Mixing Engineer
2010	Payback	Background Music Mixing Engineer
2010	Rakta Charitra	Singer – Mila toh Marega, Assistant Music Composer, Background Music mixing Engineer
2010	Rakta Charitra-II	Singer -Mila Toh Marega(Electro Mix), Assistant Music Composer, Background Music mixing Engineer
2012	Kevi Rite Jaish	Singer and Music Composer – Pankhida and Kharekhar,
2014	Gang of Ghosts	Singer- Ishq Behn ka Dinna
2014	Chachi's Funeral	Music Composer
2020	Asur (web series)	Music Supervisor

== Awards ==
2012: Won the Binani Big Gujarati Award for The Most Entertaining Song 2012 for the song "Pankhida" from the movie Kevi Rite Jaish.
