= Bey Yaar =

- Theatrical release poster
- Directed by: Abhishek Jain
- Written by: Bhavesh Mandalia; Niren Bhatt
- Produced by: Nayan Jain
- Starring: Darshan Jariwala; Manoj Joshi; Aarti Patel; Amit Mistry; Kavin Dave; Divyang Thakkar; Pratik Gandhi; Samvedna Suwalka
- Cinematography: Pushkar Singh
- Edited by: Satchit Puranik; Nirav Panchal
- Music by: Sachin–Jigar
- Production company: CineMan Productions
- Distributed by: CineMan Productions
- Release date: 29 August 2014
- Running time: 150 minutes
- Country: India
- Language: Gujarati
- Budget: ₹2.25 crore
- Box office: est. ₹8.5 crore

Bey Yaar (transl. 'Oh friend!'—An expression) is a 2014 Indian Gujarati-language coming-of-age film directed by Abhishek Jain. The film is about friendship and focuses on two childhood friends. The film stars Manoj Joshi, Darshan Jariwala, Divyang Thakkar, Pratik Gandhi, Amit Mistry, Samvedna Suwalka. The film was released on 29 August 2014. It received positive reviews and became a box-office success. It completed 50 weeks in theatres. The film was screened at the New York Indian Film Festival, becoming the first ever Gujarati film hosted by the festival.

== Plot ==
Childhood friends Chintan "Chako" (Divyang Thakkar) and Tapan "Tino" (Pratik Gandhi) aspire to invest in a real estate project called The Other Side, located near the scenic Nal Savorar area and their residence of Ahmedabad. They currently work as MRs while hoping to make quick money through a Godman who promises to triple their profits. The Godman turns out to be part of a larger con and his scheme is discovered by the police. As a result, Chako and Tino are scammed out of ₹180,000.

Chako's father, Jeetu (Darshan Jariwala), runs a small local tea stall, in which hangs a painting from a prominent artist named M.F. Hassan (based on the late M.F. Husain). The piece was gifted to Jeetu as a sign of their close friendship, before Hassan's rise to prominence and eventual death. Upon learning that Jeetu's tea stall painting is highly coveted, Tino comes up with another idea to secure an investment with The Other Side: secretly replace the painting with an identical fake one, and then loan the original for cash. Initially hesitant but desperate, Chako assists in the plan along with their friend Uday (Kavin Dave), an avid painter who begrudgingly agrees to compose an exact copy of the piece himself.

With the switch successful, Chako and Tino mortgage the original painting to a local art dealer, Y.B. Gandhi (Manoj Joshi). Shortly thereafter, however, Gandhi informs Chako that the painting he received is fake and that someone else had tried to sell the same painting to another dealer. Gandhi convinces Chako that either Tino had double-crossed him, or that his father had been lying about the painting's authenticity. Chako returns the money back to Gandhi, and angrily confronts Tino, who indeed went to a separate dealer, but was sent by Uday for an art survey only. Chako then meets his father and accuses him of confabulating a friendship. Angered by the accusations and hurt by Chako's loss of the painting, Jeetu kicks him out of the house.

The M.F. Hassan painting, however, was an original all along, and Gandhi - whom Hassan hated and never lent his work to - had cheated Chako and Tino out of the painting. Gandhi then publicly humiliates Jeetu by telling the press he never had a friendship with Hassan, and that the stories of him making his paintings at the tea stall are all false.

Hoping to redeem themselves, Chako and Tino devise a plan to take advantage of Gandhi's own greed in order to get the painting back for Jeetu. Helping with the elaborate scheme include Uday and Jigisha (Samvedna Suwalka), Tino's girlfriend. They hire a method actor named Pranav (Amit Mistry) to pose as "Prabodh Gupta", a fictitious international artist from Bihar whose work has yet to be exhibited in India. The group successfully lures Gandhi into funding a fabricated NGO and conducting Prabodh's supposed lucrative first exhibition in India, in exchange for the tea stall painting.

Pranav and Uday narrowly retrieve the painting on the day of the exhibition, just as Gandhi realizes that Prabodh is a fraud. He confronts the place of the fake NGO but encounters Chako, Tino, and Jeetu. Chako and Tino demand that he publicly retract his earlier statements about Jeetu, or else be arrested for selling fake paintings and creating the fictitious "Prabodh Gupta" himself (since Gandhi was tricked earlier into funding the fake NGO). Realizing his defeat, Gandhi tries to offer money, but Jeetu declines and chastises him for his greed being the reason Hassan never worked with large art curators.

Gandhi holds a televised news conference the next morning, apologizing for his previous accusations against Jeetu. Hassan's piece is returned to Jeetu's shop, after he and Chako fully reconcile. Uday, whose own paintings were used as Prabodh's work from earlier, is offered his own local exhibition, attended by much happier Chako and Tino.

== Cast ==
- Divyang Thakkar as Chintan a.k.a. Chako
- Pratik Gandhi as Tapan a.k.a. Tino
- Darshan Jariwala as Jeetu Bhai
- Manoj Joshi as Y.B. Gandhi
- Aarti Patel as Chintan's mother
- Amit Mistry as Pranav a.k.a. Prabodh Gupta
- Kavin Dave as Uday
- Samvedna Suwalka as Jigisha
- Subhash Brahmbhatt as Kanakiya
- Abhishek Jain as Dev
- Anang Desai as Guest Appearance in News Channel Show
- Smit Pandya as Beggar

== Production ==
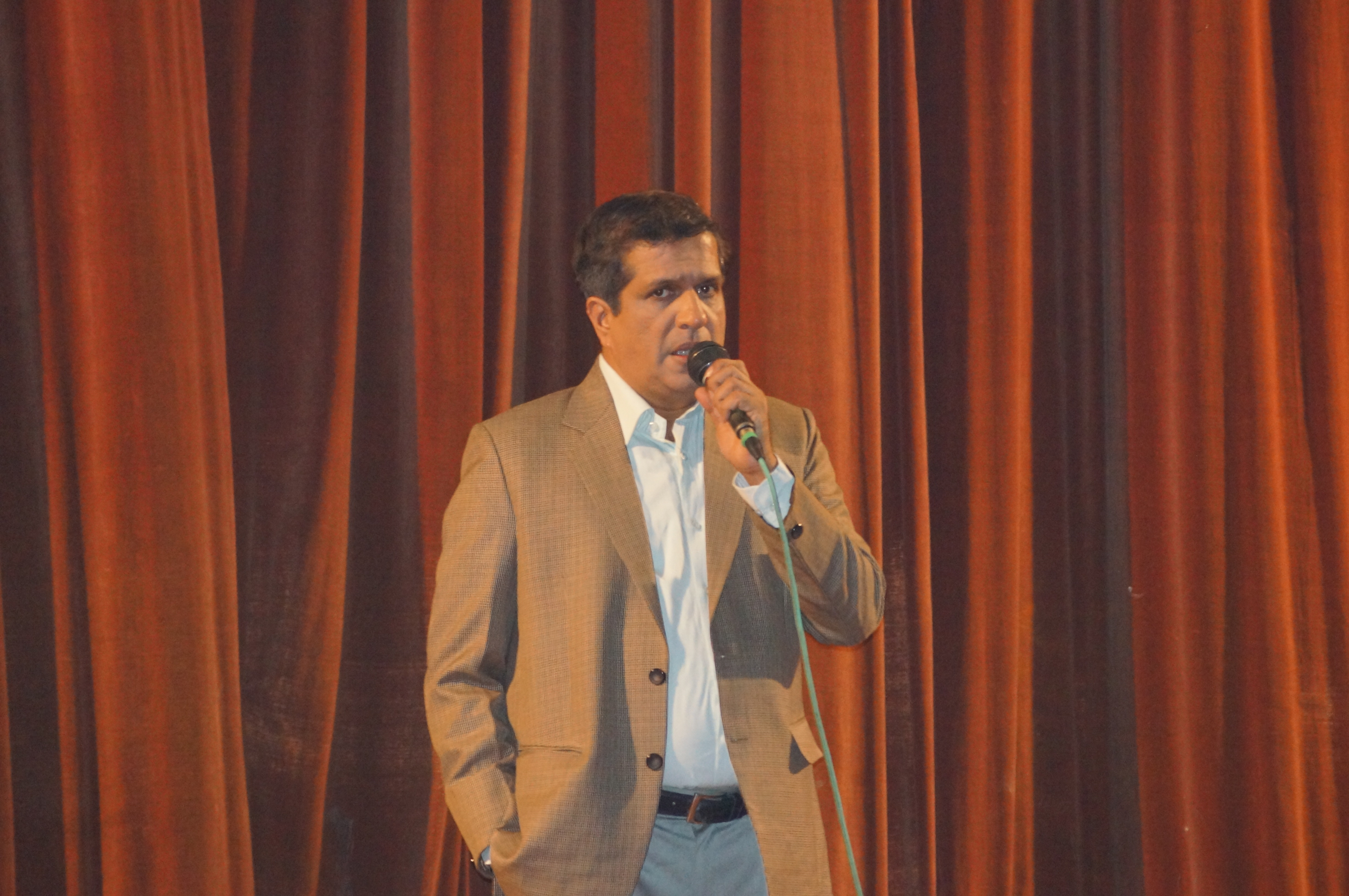
Darshan Jariwala, who played a similar role as a father figure in Ajab Prem Ki Ghazab Kahani, elaborated that each "character was built differently and that is the beautiful thing about acting."

=== Development ===
After the success of his debut film, Kevi Rite Jaish, director Abhishek Jain announced that his second film will be titled Bey Yaar, under his own banner CineMan Productions, and it will be about the "strength of friendship". Jain also took inspiration from K.H. Mohammad, who was the owner of a real life Ahmedabad tea stall, then-named Lucky Tea Stall, and had a painting gifted to him by the late Indian artist M.F. Husain, a close friend and regular customer of the stall. According to the restaurant's current manager, Siddiqui Ansari, Husain had personally presented the painting in 2004 to Mohammad, now deceased. Similar to the film's character Jeetu, as a promise to both Mohammad and Husain, Ansari and original co-partner Kutti Nayar have refused to sell the painting that still hangs in what is now called Lucky Restaurant.

=== Casting ===
Announcing the cast, Abhishek Jain mentioned that the writer of OMG – Oh My God! and national award winner, Bhavesh Mandalia will be co-writing the film and composer duo Sachin–Jigar will compose the music for the film. The cast included veteran Gujarati theatre and Hindi cinema actors like Darshan Jariwala, Amit Mistry among others. Manoj Joshi and Kavin Dave will be making their debuts in Gujarati movies. Several notable Gujaratis appeared as cameos in the film, including columnist Jay Vasavada, author Tushar Shukla, actor Archan Trivedi, art promoter Sonal Ambani and critic S.D. Desai.

=== Filming ===
The film was shot in Ahmedabad, specifically at 50 different locations in 35 days. Regarding the filming locations, Abhishek Jain said, "We have shot in the most rustic locales of Ahmedabad to bring out the real essence of the city in every scene." In March 2014, it was announced that the film was almost ready.

To help with keeping the film's principal photography organized, Jain revealed in an interview that he had 10 assistants for Bey Yaar. He wanted to narrow his responsibilities towards directing, a desire which inspired him to also hire fellow Whistling Woods International film school alum Amit Desai, who serves as the movie's Creative/Executive Producer. In an interview with his Alma mater, Desai said that all business-related and marketing choices for Bey Yaar were ultimately decided by him.

== Soundtrack ==
Bey Yaar

Soundtrack album by Sachin–Jigar
- Released: 10 August 2014
- Genre: Feature film soundtrack
- Length: 16:45
- Label: Cineman Productions Limited

Sachin–Jigar chronology
Entertainment (2014)	Bey Yaar (2014)	Finding Fanny (2014)

Music for the film is composed by Sachin–Jigar. The director Abhishek Jain said, about the music of the film, "With Bey Yaar's music we are trying to create a friendship anthem" Music review site Milliblog reviewed the soundtrack as "short but competent affair".

Track list
No.	Title	Lyrics	Singer(s)	Length
1.	"Bey Yaar Sapna Nava"	Niren Bhatt	Madhav Krishna, Darshan Raval	3:53
2.	"Bey Yaar Tara Vina"	Niren Bhatt	Sachin Sanghvi	4:55
3.	"Rakhad Rakhad"	Niren Bhatt	Keerthi Sagathia	4:03
4.	"Peechha Raja"	Niren Bhatt	Divya Kumar	3:54
Total length:				16:45

== Release ==
In July 2014, the producers released the teaser and poster. The trailer was released online on 1 August 2014. The theatrical trailer was launched on 4 August 2014 at Alpha One Mall in Ahmedabad. The film was released on 29 August 2014.

The movie was initially released at Ahmedabad, Surat, and Vadodara. After the great response in the first week, the movie was released in Rajkot, Jamnagar, and Bhavnagar in the second week. It expanded its presence across the multiplexes in Gujarat with 127 shows daily in the fourth week. After the success, it was released in Mumbai and Delhi as well. Subsequently, It was released in Melbourne, Sydney, and Brisbane in Australia on 9 October 2014. It was released in the US the next month. Eventually, the film was released across six continents, the first Gujarati film to do so. The DVD Home media was released in June 2015.

== Reception ==
=== Critical reception ===
Critical reception to the film has been mostly positive. Divya Bhaskar praised the film and rated it 3 out of 5 stars. BuddyBits.com rated it 4.5 out of 5 stars praising it to be one of the best films coming out from Gujarati cinema. Sandesh praised it and called it a mature movie. Times of India reviewed it positively saying, "Wonderfully executed, beautifully crafted and crisply edited, the movie makes the popcorn and the hot cuppa more enjoyable." and rated it 4 stars out of 5. Jay Vasavada called it, "Brilliant, Brave, Bright". The film was screened at New York Indian Film Festival on 5 May 2015 and became the first ever Gujarati film to do so.

=== Box office ===
The film had a limited release across cinemas in Gujarat and Maharashtra, but was running with packed houses on the day of the release and continued the success in the first weekend. The film completed 100 days in many cities and eventually completed 50 weeks. The film collected ₹8.5 crore (US$880,000) on the box office.

== Awards ==
=== 14th Annual Transmedia Gujarati Screen & Stage Awards ===
The film was nominated for 14 out of 16 categories and won a total of 9 awards, including best film.

- Best film – Bey Yaar
- Best director – Abhishek Jain
- Best scriptwriter (Story, Screenplay & Dialogue) – Bhavesh Mandalia, Niren H Bhatt
- Best actor (male) – Divyang Thakkar
- Best actor (female) – Samwedna Suwalka
- Best supporting actor (male) – Darshan Jariwala
- Best supporting actor (male) – Kavin Dave
- Best supporting actor (female) – Arati Patel
- Best actor in a negative role – Manoj Joshi
- Best cinematographer – Pushkar Singh
- Best Editor – Satchit Puranik, Nirav Panchal
- Best music – Sachin–Jigar
- Best singer (male) – Darshan Raval
- Best lyrics – Niren H Bhatt
