= Made in China (2019 film) =

2019 Indian Hindi comedy film directed by Mikhil Musale

- Theatrical release poster
- Directed by: Mikhil Musale
- Written by: Dialogues: Karan Vyas; Niren Bhatt
- Screenplay by: Mikhil Musale; Karan Vyas; Niren Bhatt
- Story by: Mikhil Musale; Karan Vyas; Parinda Joshi
- Based on: Made in China by Parinda Joshi
- Produced by: Dinesh Vijan
- Starring: Rajkummar Rao; Mouni Roy; Boman Irani
- Cinematography: Anuj Rakesh Dhawan
- Edited by: Manan Ashwin Mehta
- Music by: Sachin–Jigar
- Production companies: Maddock Films; Jio Studios
- Distributed by: AA Films
- Release date: 25 October 2019
- Running time: 128 minutes
- Country: India
- Language: Hindi
- Box office: est. ₹12.81 crore

Made in China is a 2019 Indian Hindi-language comedy film directed by Mikhil Musale. Produced by Dinesh Vijan under Maddock Films, the film stars Rajkummar Rao, Mouni Roy, Boman Irani, and explores the story of a Gujarati businessman, played by Rao, who goes to China to increase his business prospects. The film is based on the novel of the same name by Parinda Joshi.

Principal photography began in September 2018 and concluded in May 2019. Initially planned to be released in August 2019. The film was theatrically released in India on 25 October 2019, on the occasion of Diwali.

== Plot ==
During a cultural event in Gujarat, a Chinese delegate, General Zeng, consumes a product called Tiger Soup and dies. The investigation into his death points towards the Tiger Soup, which he consumed just moments before passing out and away, as a possible cause of death, and CBI officers Sharma and Gupta look for Raghuvir "Raghu" Mehta, the product's original manufacturer, who eventually surrenders himself to the authorities upon severe interrogation.

Over a flashback, it is shown that Raghu has been a failed Gujarati entrepreneur who lives with his wife Rukmini and his son Chintu. Despite being in charge of his late father's mattress business, which everybody including him now feels has been sustaining losses for too long, he struggles to come up with a profitable business idea and has cycled through several products which have failed to take off. His uncle forces him to go on a trip to China with his cousin Devraj where he is to meet investors about a sports drink business. While in China, Devraj presents his product to Tanmay, a successful Gujarati entrepreneur, who rejects it. Despondent over the rejection, as Devraj abandons him to his own devices, Raghu strikes up a bond with Tanmay who explains the philosophy behind entrepreneurship to him. Raghu goes on a drunken binge with Devraj's contact Xui Lee, and in a stupor, commits to meet her boss Hao Li while posing as Devraj.

During the meeting, Hao introduces Raghu to Tiger Penis Soup which is the Chinese equivalent of Viagra. Hao proposes that Raghu shall sell this product in India and suggests that it will be successful over there because Chinese and Indians are constantly thinking about sex. While researching the market in India, Raghu realizes that there is no genuine solution available for sexual problems faced by men. Raghu proposes a business partnership to Dr. Tribhuvan Vardhi, a sexologist whose books have impressed Raghu, but Vardhi initially rejects the offer. Meanwhile, Raghu's inability to provide a steady income for his family creates tension between him and Rukmini. Raghu proceeds to recruit Vardhi with the promise of spreading sex awareness to the public and eventually Vardhi agrees. Back in the present, General Zeng's autopsy is held up in diplomatic red tape, forcing Sharma and Gupta into trying to get to the truth through Raghu, who remains adamant about nothing being faulty with his product.

Rewinding to the past, Raghu puts together a team of talented young professionals to handle manufacturing and distribution of the product. After some initial struggles, Raghu meets Tanmay who suggests Vardhi as the face of their product. The team arranges a seminar but Vardhi accidentally walks into a parent-teacher conference; his impassioned plea to make sexual discourse normal in society goes viral. As a result, the Tiger Soup business is wildly successful. However, Raghu hides the product from Rukmini and his extended family who think that he is running a business related to Chinese fans. Devraj soon finds out that the Tiger Soup is behind Raghu's success. Raghu meets his idol Abhay Chopra, a successful investor and motivational speaker, who is in league with Devraj. Chopra proposes a business partnership but Raghu rejects the proposal; in retaliation, Devraj reveals to the family that Raghu is running the ostensibly disreputable Tiger Soup business.

Chintu is expelled from his school when a bottle of Tiger Soup is found in his bag. Once a livid Rukmini finds out that Raghu lied about his business, she confronts him about it. A distressed Raghu goes to Vardhi to end their partnership but a timely call from Tanmay causes him to reconsider. Back to the present, Raghu and Vardhi appear before a preliminary commission consisting of several government agencies to explain their role in Zeng's death. Raghu reveals that there is no secret ingredient in the soup; it is just rabdi, an Indian dessert, and implies that most sexual issues are more psychological than biological. Vardhi appeals to the commission not to consider sex as a taboo topic and encourages them to let the product continue instead of banning it. However, while bureaucratic pressures from the Chinese delegation force the commission to ban the Tiger Soup for some time, Raghu and Vardhi are acquitted and convey to the media that they are happy the product was not banned completely.

At the end, Raghu is shown as a successful owner of a chain of sexual health-related clinics with Vardhi as the face of the business and he is invited to a premier business school to give a lecture on being an entrepreneur. Rukmini is overwhelmed at the success of her husband and the achievements he has made. Raghu ends the story with the same catchphrase that Tanmay had previously taught him.

== Cast ==
- Rajkummar Rao as Raghuveer 'Raghu' Mehta
- Mouni Roy as Rukmini Mehta
- Boman Irani as Dr. Tribhuvan Vardhi
- Abhishek Banerjee as Investigator Sharma
- Amyra Dastur as Rupali 'Roopa' Bansal
- Paresh Rawal as Tanmay Shah
- Gajraj Rao as Abhay Chopra
- Sumeet Vyas as Devraj
- Danni Wang as Xui Lee
- Manoj Joshi as Vitthal Bhai
- Amit Bimrot as Ravi Panchal
- Ragi Jani as Kannudo
- Chittaranjan Tripathy as Investigator Gupta
- Bijou Thaangjam as Chinese Official
- Shraddha Musale as Anchor at Award Ceremony
- Shataf Figar as SIT Head
- Jigar Saraiya in a special appearance in the opening sequence as the musician

== Production ==
The film was announced in June 2018 with Mouni Roy and Rajkummar Rao in lead roles, to be directed by Mikhil Musale. The film was shot in China and Ahmedabad.

The principal photography of the film began in September 2018. The film was wrapped up in the end of May 2019.

== Marketing and release ==
In October 2018, Rao and Musale announced the release date of 30 August 2019. In July 2019, the release date of the film was declared not yet confirmed, when the makers of the high-budget trilingual film Saaho shifted its release date from 15 to 30 August 2019. In late-August 2019, it was officially announced that the film had got a new release date, 25 October 2019, clashing with Housefull 4 and Saand Ki Aankh.

On 11 September 2019, the motion poster of the film was released.

== Reception ==
=== Critical response ===
Anna M. M. Vetticad of Firstpost gave two-star out of five and opined that the film had 'tonal and logical inconsistency in the narrative.' She noted that the film was a drag on long stretches, and the storytelling lacked liveliness. However, praising the performance of Rao and Roy, Vetticad concluded, "Made in China fails to hit the bull's eye because it sorely needed an evening out of pace and tone, depth of characterisation and detailing in the plotline. The best thing about it are Rao and Irani, who are a pleasure to watch even in this middling affair.".

=== Box office ===
Made In China's opening day domestic collection was ₹90 lacs. On the second day, the film collected ₹1.25 crore. On the third day, the film collected ₹90 lacs, taking total opening weekend collection to ₹3.05 crore.

As of 17 November 2019, with a gross of ₹11.46 crore in India and ₹1.35 crore overseas, the film has a worldwide gross collection of ₹12.81 crore.

== Soundtrack ==
Made in China

Soundtrack album by Sachin–Jigar
- Released: 12 November 2019
- Recorded: 2018–2019
- Genre: Feature film soundtrack
- Length: 18:07
- Language: Hindi
- Label: Sony Music India

Sachin–Jigar chronology
Arjun Patiala (2019)	Made in China (2019)	Bala (2019)

The music of the film is composed by Sachin–Jigar, while lyrics are written by Vayu, Jigar Saraiya, Priya Saraiya, and Niren Bhatt. There are three adapted songs of the four. The first two, "Odhani" and "Sanedo", are inspired by two original Gujarati folk songs, while the third, "Naari Naari", derives from the hugely popular eponymous Arabic song Habibi Dah (Nari Narain). "Sanedo" song is inspired by Gujarati folk style of Sanedo.

Track listing
No.	Title	Lyrics	Singer(s)	Length
1.	"Odhani"	Niren Bhatt, Jigar Saraiya	Neha Kakkar, Darshan Raval	3:15
2.	"Sanedo"	Niren Bhatt, Jigar Saraiya	Mika Singh, Nikhita Gandhi, Benny Dayal	3:51
3.	"The Naari Naari Song"	Vayu	Vishal Dadlani, Jonita Gandhi, Sachin–Jigar	3:16
4.	"Valam"	Priya Saraiya	Arijit Singh, Priya Saraiya, Sachin–Jigar	3:15
5.	"Valam" (Unplugged)	Priya Saraiya	Priya Saraiya, Sachin–Jigar	4:30
Total length:				18:07
