= Shraddha Musale =

Indian model and actress

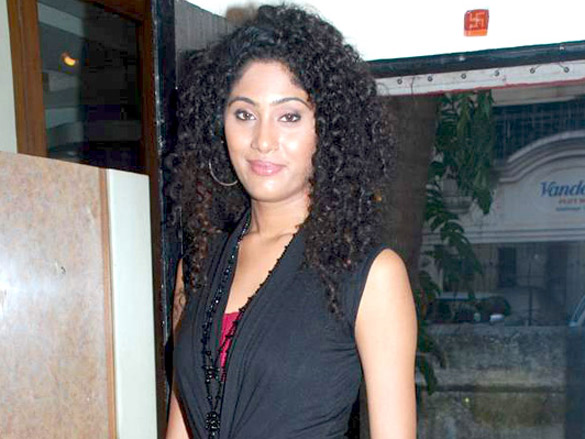
- Shraddha in 2010
- Born: 7 January 1984 (age 42); Ahmedabad, Gujarat, India
- Occupations: Model; Actress; Businesswomen
- Known for: Dr. Tarika in the TV series, C.I.D.
- Spouse: Deepak Tomar (m. 2012)
- Relatives: Mikhil Musale (Brother)

Shraddha Musale (born 7 January 1984) is an Indian actress, model, entrepreneur, and author known most popularly for her role as Dr. Tarika in the long-running television series C.I.D. .

Musale starred in the 2009 Hindi film All the Best: Fun Begins as Betty and has also portrayed CJ in the show Miley Jab Hum Tum. In 2016, she appeared in an episodic role of Khidki.

== Early life ==
Musale is from Ahmedabad. Although she is not a Gujarati, she understands and speaks the language fluently. In 2002, after passing from her Ahmedabad school, Musale participated in Miss India contest in 2002 with Neha Dhupia, and was her roommate.

== Filmography ==
=== Films ===
Year	Films	Role
2009	All the Best: Fun Begins	Betty
2019	Made in China	Anchor at Award Ceremony

=== Television ===
Year	Show	Role	Notes
2007–2018; 2025	C.I.D	Dr. Tarika	
2007	Kahaani Ghar Ghar Kii	Malishka	
2007–2008	Kya Dill Mein Hai	Mansha	
2008–2010	Miley Jab Hum Tum	CJ	
2011–2012	Shobha Somnath Ki	Bhairavi	
2011	Love U Zindagi	Joanna	
2012	CID Viruddh Adaalat	Dr. Tarika	
2012	Ek Hazaaron Mein Meri Behna Hai	Dr. Seema	Episode 184 (Season 4, Episode 61)
2015	Janbaaz Sindbad	Gul	Episode 4
2015	Sasural Simar Ka	Lady with the Tattoo	Episode 1322-1323, 1327-1328
2016	Khidki	Bhanupriya	Story 2 - Govinda Govinda (Episode 6 - 11)
2016	Khidki	Chudail	Story 17 - Bhoot Bangla (Episode 84 - 88)
2017–2018	Porus	Queen Mahanandini, Laachi's mother	
2019	Thinkistan	Nina	MX Player's web series

== Personal life ==
She married Deepak Tomar, a businessman from Lucknow on 29 November 2012.
