= Abhishek Jain =

Indian film director and producer (born 1986)

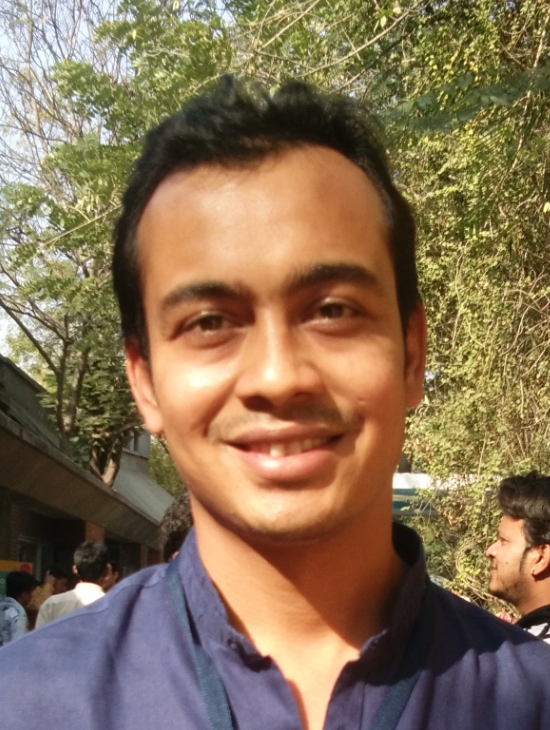
- Jain at Gujarat Literature Festival, 2016
- Born: 3 August 1986 (age 40); Ahmedabad, Gujarat, India
- Education: Whistling Woods
- Occupations: Director, Producer
- Years active: 2011–present
- Organization: CineMan Productions
- Notable work: Kevi Rite Jaish; Bey Yaar; Wrong Side Raju
- Relatives: Nayan Jain (Brother)

Abhishek Jain is an Indian film writer, director and producer known for his Gujarati films Kevi Rite Jaish, Bey Yaar, and Wrong Side Raju. He is credited with the revival of Gujarati cinema with Kevi Rite Jaish.

He is the founder of CineMan Productions Ltd., a feature film and ad film production company, and Oho Gujarati – India’s first exclusive Gujarati OTT platform.

In 2021, he made his Hindi directorial debut with Hum Do Hamare Do, produced under the banner of Maddock Films, for which his company also served as an associate producer.

== Early life ==
Abhishek Jain was born on 3 August 1986 in Ahmedabad. He is a Marwari Jain. He received BBA degree from BK Majumdar Institute of Business Administration (BKMIBA); now part of Ahmedabad University, in 2006 and a degree in film-making from Whistling Woods in 2008.

== Career ==
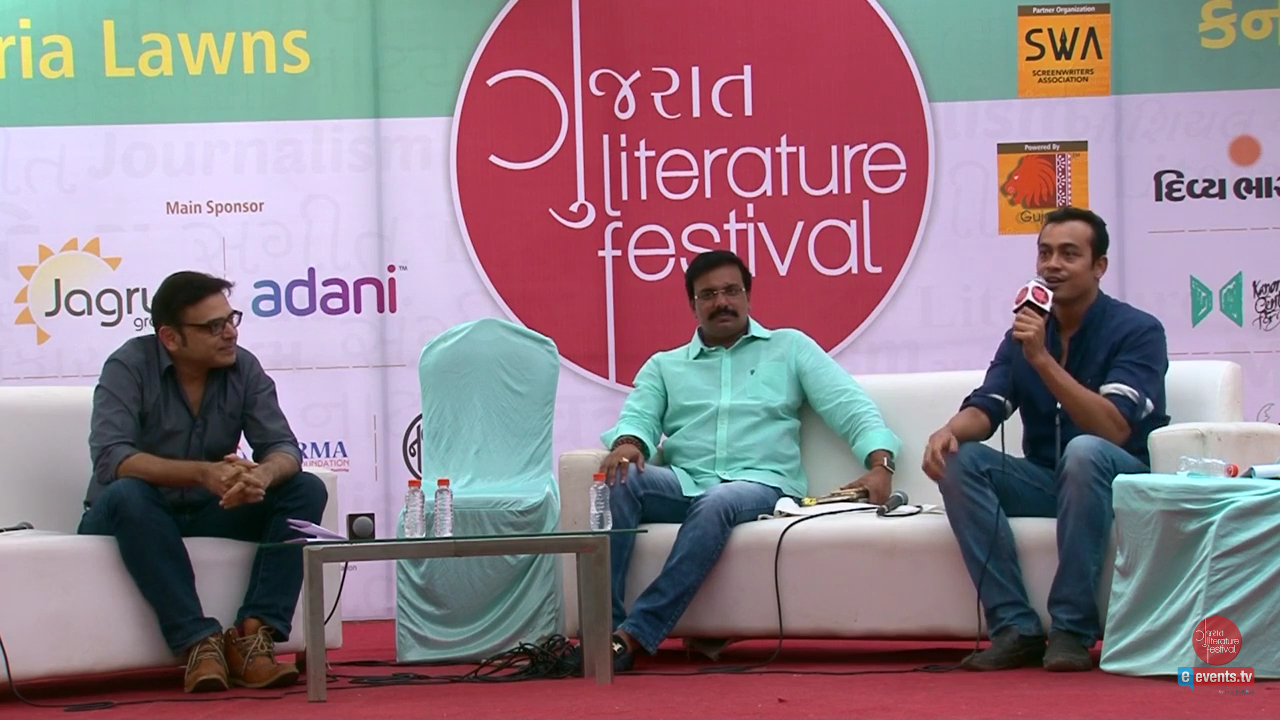
from left, Harsh Chhaya, Ankit Trivedi and Abhishek Jain at GLF, Ahmedabad on 18 December 2016

After finishing the course at Whistling Woods, he assisted Sanjay Leela Bhansali and Subhash Ghai on the films Guzaarish and Yuvvraaj.

After returning to Ahmedabad, Jain started working as a radio jockey on Radio Mirchi. Jain then met Mikhil Musale and Anish Shah during an international film festival in Ahmedabad and founded CineMan Productions in 2010. He made his debut film, Kevi Rite Jaish (2012) in Gujarati language. He was awarded Trend setter award by Gujarati Innovation Society due to the success of Kevi Rite Jaish. After the success of his debut movie, he directed Bey Yaar (2014) which was critically acclaimed and was commercially successful. In February 2016, Abhishek Jain announced that CineMan Productions will co-produce three Gujarati films with Phantom Films, out of which one will be directed by Abhishek himself. The first film released under joint banner of CineMan productions and Phantom films was Wrong Side Raju, directed by Mikhil Musale, co-founder of CineMan productions, which won National Film Award for Best Feature Film in Gujarati at the 64th National Film Awards.

In June 2015, he published Aa To Just Vaat Chhe..., a book on his experiences while making his first two urban Gujarati films.

In April 2019, he was on board to the Hindi remake of the hit Kannada film Kirik Party, but he subsequently left the film. In 2021, he directed Hindi-language comedy drama film Hum Do Hamare Do.

Jain has also served as a jury member at the International Film Festival of India (IFFI), the National Film Awards, and for India’s official selection for the Academy Awards.

== Filmography ==
=== Films ===
Year	Film	Director	Producer	Writer	Language	Notes
2012	Kevi Rite Jaish	Yes	Yes	Yes	Gujarati	
2014	Bey Yaar	Yes	Yes	Yes	Gujarati	
2016	Wrong Side Raju		Yes (Note: credited as co-producer)		Gujarati	
2017	Shubh Aarambh		Yes (Note: credited as co-producer)		Gujarati	
2021	Hum Do Hamare Do	Yes		story	Hindi	released on Disney+ Hotstar
2025	Auntypreneur		Yes (Note: credited as co-producer)		Gujarati	
2025	Maaran	Yes	Yes		Gujarati	
2026	Manch	Yes	Yes		Gujarati	

Assistant Director

Year	Film
2008	Yuvvraaj
2010	Guzaarish

=== Television ===
Year	Series	Season	Director	Producer	Language	Network/Platform	Notes
2021	Vitthal Teedi	1	Yes	Yes	Gujarati	OHO Gujarati	Web series
2021	Riverfront Stories	1	Yes	Yes	Gujarati	OHO Gujarati	Episode: Vaat Raat Maan
2022	Missing	1	Yes	Yes	Gujarati	OHO Gujarati	Web series

== Books ==
- Jain, Abhishek; Patel, Arati (2015). Aa To Just Vaat Chhe. Navbharat Sahitya Mandir. ISBN 978-9351980742.

== Awards ==
Film	Awards	Category
Kevi Rite Jaish	2012 BIG Gujarati Entertainment Awards	Best Director
Kevi Rite Jaish	12th Annual Transmedia Gujarati Screen & Stage awards	Best Director
Kevi Rite Jaish	12th Annual Transmedia Gujarati Screen & Stage awards	Best Story
Bey Yaar	14th Annual Transmedia Gujarati Screen & Stage awards	Best Director
Wrong Side Raju	16th Annual Transmedia Gujarati Screen & Stage awards	Best film

== See also ==
- CineMan Productions
