= Victor 303 =

2025 Indian action film directed by Swapnil Mehta

- Official Poster
- Directed by: Swapnil Mehta
- Written by: Swapnil Mehta
- Produced by: Rekha Mangroliya; Komal Mangroliya; Hetvi Shah; Vishal Vada Vala
- Starring: Jagjeetsinh Vadher; Anjali Barot; Alisha Prajapati; Chetan Dhanani; Abhinay Banker
- Cinematography: Mihir Fichadiya
- Edited by: Prayagraj Choksy
- Music by: Kedar Bhargav
- Production company: Reset Entertainment Limited
- Distributed by: Rupam Entertainment Pvt Ltd
- Release date: 3 January 2025
- Running time: 116.01
- Country: India
- Language: Gujarati

Victor 303 is a 2025 Indian Gujarati drama action film directed and written by Swapnil Mehta. It stars Jagjeetsinh Vadher, Anjali Barot, Alisha Prajapati, Chetan Dhanani, Abhinay Banker, and others. The film is produced by Rekha Mangroliya, Komal Mangroliya, Hetvi Shah and Vishal Vada Vala and it was released nationwide on 3 January 2025.

== Plot ==
Following a bitter heartbreak, orphaned Victor crashes his lover's wedding, unknowingly sparking a violent feud with the salt mafia that rules the infamous land of Maliya Miyana. What begins as a quest for revenge quickly spirals into a deadly game of betrayal and bloodshed. As the conflict unfolds, Victor learns his true identity and the legacy he never knew he had, forcing him to confront his past and claim the future he was always meant to inherit.

== Cast ==
- Jagjeetsinh Vadher as Victor
- Anjali Barot
- Alisha Prajapati
- Chetan Dhanani
- Abhinay Banker
- Jahnvi Chauhan
- Bimal Trivedi
- Mayur Soneji
- Nakshraaj
- Kishan Gadhavi
- Ekta Bachwani
- Kinnary Pankti Panchal
- Rudraksh Nisiddh Panchal

== Soundtrack ==
Victor 303

Soundtrack album by Kedar-Bhargav
- Released: 13 December 2024
- Genre: Feature film soundtrack
- Length: 8:03
- Language: Gujarati
- Label: Reset Entertainment Limited

=== Tracklist ===
All lyrics are written by Bhargav Purohit; all music is composed by Kedar-Bhargav

Track listing
| No. | Title | Lyrics | Music | Singer(s) | Length |
|---|---|---|---|---|---|
| 1. | "Goom" | Bhargav Purohit | Kedar-Bhargav | Vrattini Ghadge, Vivek Rao | 4:43 |
| 2. | "Pankha Fast Chhe" | Bhargav Purohit | Kedar-Bhargav | Nakash Aziz | 3:20 |
| Total length: | | | | | 08:03 |

== Production ==
The film was shot across various locations in Bhuj, Kutch.

== Marketing and releases ==
The film was announced on 20 August 2024. The release date was revealed on 7 November 2024, along with the official film poster. A teaser was launched on 3 December 2024, followed by the official trailer on 15 December 2024. The film was released on 3 January 2025.

== See also ==
- List of Gujarati films of 2025
