= Reva (film) =

- Theatrical release poster
- Directed by: Rahul Bhole; Vinit Kanojia
- Written by: Rahul Bhole; Vinit Kanojia
- Based on: Tatvamasi by Dhruv Bhatt
- Produced by: Paresh Vora
- Starring: Chetan Dhanani; Monal Gajjar; Prashant Barot; Yatin Karyekar; Muni Jha; Daya Shankar Pandey; Abhinay Banker
- Cinematography: Suraj C Kurade
- Edited by: Rahul Bhole; Vinit Kanojia
- Music by: Amar Khanda
- Production companies: Brainbox Studios; Baroda Talkies
- Distributed by: AA Films
- Release date: 6 April 2018
- Running time: 158 minutes
- Country: India
- Language: Gujarati

Reva: A Journey Within is a 2018 Gujarati adventure drama film starring Chetan Dhanani and Monal Gajjar produced by Brainbox Studios and Baroda Talkies. The film is based on Gujarati author Dhruv Bhatt's 1998 Gujarati novel Tatvamasi. The film was directed by Rahul Bhole and Vinit Kanojia. It was released on 6 April 2018 to highly positive critic reviews praising performances of cast, story and cinematography and positive commercial acclaim too. The film won the National Film Award for Best Feature Film in Gujarati.

== Plot ==
Karan is a spoiled rich 25-year-old American NRI who has an extravagant life with his needs being at the centre of his world. His grandfather passes away and leaves all his wealth in his will to a charity, an Ashram located at the banks of the Narmada River in India. The only way he could get his wealth back was to convince the Ashram to sign a No Objection Certificate. Thus, Karan embarks on a journey to the remote Ashram with little expectation of the adventures he was about to encounter that would set in motion events beyond his control.

== Cast ==
- Chetan Dhanani as Karan
- Monal Gajjar as Supriya
- Yatin Karyekar as Shashtriji
- Muni Jha as Lawyer
- Daya Shankar Pandey as Gandu Fakir
- Sejal Shah as Vanita (Supriya's mother)
- Abhinay Banker as Banga
- Atul Mahale as Bittu
- Subhash Brahmbhatt as Dada
- Firoz Bhagat as Mehta Uncle
- Rupa Borgaonkar as Puriya
- Prashant Barot as Guptaji
- Malhar Thakar - Special appearance as Parikramavasi

== Production ==
The film is based on Gujarati author Dhruv Bhatt's 1998 Gujarati novel Tatvamasi. The directors found the number of characters and the philosophy of novel challenging to adapt for the film. The author had permitted them for changes. The screenplay was written by the directors. The film was shot at 15 different locations in Gujarat (GJ) and Madhya Pradesh (MP), most on the banks of river Narmada, including Bhedaghat, Gaurighat, Maheshwar Ghat and Mangrol. Some scenes were shot at Polo Forest and inside Naida Caves on the Diu island.

== Soundtrack ==
Reva

Soundtrack album by Amar Khanda
- Released: 3 March 2018
- Recorded: 2018
- Genre: Feature film soundtrack
- Length: 21:35
- Language: Gujarati
- Label: Red Ribbon Musik
- Producer: Paresh Vyas
External audio
- Official Audio Jukebox on YouTube

All music is composed by Amar Khanda.

Track listing
No.	Title	Lyrics	Singer(s)	Length
1.	"Maa Reva Journey"	Chetan Dhanani	Kirtidan Gadhvi	3:22
2.	"Reva Title Track"	Chetan Dhanani	Divya Kumar	3:42
3.	"Namami Devi Narmade"	Chetan Dhanani, Traditional Shlokas	Bhavya Pandit, Shalaka Redkar, Sriram Iyer	4:12
4.	"Sangeet Jalso (Daras Piya Si)"	Pankaj Trivedi	Arpita Mukherjee	5:05
5.	"Uth Jaag Musafir"	Chetan Dhanani	Shahzan Mujeeb, Archana Shrikanth	3:43
6.	"Kaalo Bhammariyo"	Traditional Folk	Arohi Mhatre	2:44
Total length:				21:35

== Release ==
The film was released on 6 April 2018 across Gujarat and Maharashtra. The film grossed over ₹3 crore (US$310,000) on the box office.

== Reception ==
The film opened to the positive reviews. Shruti Jambhekar of The Times of India giving in 4.5 out of 5. She praised story and adaptation, performances and cinematography. DeshGujarat also give it 4.5 out of 5 and also praised its music. Ketan Mistry writing for Chitralekha magazine also praised the adaptation.

The film won National Film Award for Best Feature Film in Gujarati at the 66th National Film Awards.
