= Maaran (2026 film) =

2026 Gujarati language thriller film

- Theatrical release poster
- Directed by: Abhishek Jain
- Written by: Divya Mahendrabhai Thakore
- Produced by: Nayan Jain; Amit Desai; Abhishek Jain
- Starring: Yash Soni; Deeksha Joshi; Shruhad Goswami; Prachi Thaker; Tarjanee Bhadla; Abhinay Banker
- Cinematography: Pratik Parmar
- Edited by: Omkar Nilange; Harsh Anandani; Devarshi Barot
- Music by: Aalap Dipesh Desai; Parth Dipesh Desai
- Production company: CineMan Productions
- Distributed by: Rupam Entertainment Pvt Ltd
- Release date: 30 July 2026
- Running time: 137 minutes
- Country: India
- Language: Gujarati

Maaran is a 2026 Indian Gujarati thriller drama film directed by Abhishek Jain. The film stars Yash Soni, Deeksha Joshi, Shruhad Goswami, Prachi Thaker, Tarjanee Bhadla, Abhinay Banker in leading roles. The film won National Film Award for Best Feature Film in Gujarati at the 72nd National Film Awards.

== Plot ==
In a patriarchal society, two strangers – Birwa, a trafficking survivor and Tara, who faces the same fate – are drawn into the path of a ruthless predator. Maaran exposes the devastating impact of gender-based violence and oppression.

== Cast ==
- Yash Soni as Ratan
- Deeksha Joshi as Birwa
- Shruhad Goswami as Babu
- Prachi Thaker as Urmi
- Tarjanee Bhadla as Purva Joshi
- Dhairya Thakkar as Banti
- Druma Mehta as Tara
- Abhinay Banker as Sameer
- Morli Patel as Birwa’s mother
- Garima Bhardwaj as Anshu
- Kukul Tarmaster as Chandu

== Development ==
Jain was inspired to make the film based on a real-life encounter. In an interview, he said, "There are unsettling realities within our society that I feel desperately need cinematic expression. What served as a germ of Maaran's story is an incident I witnessed while travelling from Mumbai to Ahmedabad in 2019: I saw a woman being beaten in public. When I stepped in to intervene, she pleaded with me, He is my husband, sir, please leave it be. Thousands of women vanish every single day, and the societal gaze that follows them is heartbreaking. What we have shown is not fiction. It is a harsh reality that happens around us every single day, which is why after watching the film, audiences are left in silence, with a heavy heart and a lump in their throat." The series was originally conceived and shot as a web series but was released as a feature film.

== Release ==
The film's poster and theatrical release date were unveiled at an event in Ahmedabad by Gujarat Chief Minister Bhupendrabhai Patel and Deputy Chief Minister of Gujarat Harsh Sanghavi. This film was released in theaters On 30 July 2026.

== Reception ==
Rahul Desai, writing for The Hollywood Reporter praised the film and said, "Abhishek Jain’s National-award winning Gujarati thriller is a potent and well-performed examination of patriarchy and its psychological scars."

=== Accolades ===
The film won National Film Award for Best Feature Film in Gujarati at the 72nd National Film Awards.

== See also ==
- List of Gujarati films of 2026
- List of Gujarati films
