= Sajini Shinde Ka Viral Video =

2023 black comedy mystery film by Mikhil Musale

- Theatrical release poster
- Directed by: Mikhil Musale
- Written by: Mikhil Musale; Parinda Joshi; Anu Singh Choudhary; Kshitij Patwardhan
- Produced by: Dinesh Vijan
- Starring: Radhika Madan; Nimrat Kaur; Bhagyashree; Subodh Bhave; Chinmay Mandlekar
- Cinematography: Tribhuvan Babu Sadineni
- Edited by: Devang Desai
- Music by: Score: Hitesh Sonik; Songs: Tanishk Bagchi; Swager Boy; Shruti Dhasmana; Aatman Nepali; Mellow D SlowCheeta; Shwetang Shankar; Pratiksha Kale
- Production company: Maddock Films
- Distributed by: Pen Marudhar Entertainment
- Release date: 27 October 2023
- Running time: 114 minutes
- Country: India
- Language: Hindi

Sajini Shinde Ka Viral Video (transl. Sajini Shinde's Viral Video) is a 2023 Indian Hindi-language mystery film directed by Mikhil Musale and produced by Dinesh Vijan via his company Maddock Films. It stars Nimrat Kaur, Radhika Madan, Bhagyashree and Subodh Bhave as leads.

The film was released on 27 October 2023.

== Plot ==
Sajini Shinde is a physics teacher in a reputed school in Pune. The film starts with a party scene in Singapore where Sajini, her friend Shraddha and others are celebrating Sajini's birthday. Sajini is apprehensive about partying at a nightclub, but her fiancé, Siddhant Kadam, urges her to do so. Sajini decides to let go of her inhibitions and enjoy the night. After having a few drinks, Sajini dances. Sharaddha accidentally posts the video of Sajini dancing on the school's WhatsApp group. The video goes viral and evokes an adverse public response in her city, in her school and in her hometown, Ahmednagar. As a young school teacher from a small town stuck between traditional values and modern ambitions, Sajini finds herself in a nightmarish situation. After she returns to India, she is promptly sacked by the school principal under pressure from outraged parents and committee members. She requests the principal to reinstate her, but she refuses.

Sajini's father is a reputed theatre actor. He is autocratic by nature and her family is conservative. She realises that she has nowhere to go. Sajini disappears after leaving a suicide note on her social media account blaming her family and fiancé for her suicide. Shraddha causes the Pune polices to take action. This incident turns into a major public uproar and the police are pressured into investigating Sajini's disappearance. Inspector Barot and Inspector Ram are deputed to solve the case.

== Cast ==
- Radhika Madan as Sajini Suryakant Shinde
- Nimrat Kaur as Inspector Bela Barot
- Bhagyashree as the school principal, Kalyani Pandit
- Subodh Bhave as Suryakant Shinde, Sajini's father
- Soham Majumdar as Siddhant Kadam, Sajini's fiancée
- Chinmay Mandlekar as Inspector Ram Pawar
- Shruti Vyas as Shraddha Oswal, Sajini's friend
- Sumeet Vyas as Lalit Gandhi, Siddhant's lawyer
- Sneha Raikar as Urmila Shinde, Sajini's mother
- Ashutosh Gaikwad as Aakash Shinde, Sajini's younger brother
- Rashmi Agdekar as Chhavi Joshi, Sajini's roommate and friend
- Gurinder Singh Pawar as Manav Rathi, Chavvi's boyfriend
- Kiran Karmarkar as Yashwant Desai, Suryakant's lawyer
- Kavi Shastri as Jayant
- Devarshi Shah as Dhruv
- Akshay Tanksale as Milind Sabne
- Pallavi Jadhao as Jyoti
- Disha Danade as Ranjana
- Priyanshu Chatterjee

== Production ==
=== Development ===
The film was initially titled Happy Teacher's Day, which was later changed to Sajini Shinde Ka Viral Video.

=== Filming ===
Principal photography commenced in September 2022. Production wrapped first schedule in November 2022.

== Music ==
Sajini Shinde Ka Viral Video

Soundtrack album by Tanishk Bagchi, Swager Boy, Shruti Dhasmana, Aatman Nepali, Mellow D, SlowCheeta, Shwetang Shankar and Pratiksha Kale
- Released: 3 November 2023
- Recorded: 2022
- Genre: Feature film soundtrack
- Length: 12:17
- Language: Hindi
- Label: Zee Music Company

Official audio
- Sajini Shinde Ka Viral Video - Full Album on YouTube

The music of the film is composed by Tanishk Bagchi, Swager Boy, Shruti Dhasmana, Aatman Nepali, Mellow D, SlowCheeta, Shwetang Shankar and Pratiksha Kale while lyrics written by Swager Boy, Shloke Lal, Rimi Dhar, Mellow D, SlowCheeta, Shwetang Shankar and Pratiksha Kale.

Track listing
No.	Title	Lyrics	Music	Singer(s)	Length
1.	"Nana Chi Taang"	Swager Boy, Shloke Lal	Tanishk Bagchi, Swager Boy	Swager Boy, Shreya Jain	3:06
2.	"Dil Mera"	Rimi Dhar	Shruti Dhasmana, Aatman Nepali	Shruti Dhasmana	3:43
3.	"Girls Night Out"	Mellow D	Mellow D	Yo Yo Honey Singh, Sharvi Yadav	2:47
4.	"Gheun Taak"	SlowCheeta	SlowCheeta, Shwetang Shankar, Pratiksha Kale	SlowCheeta, Shwetang Shankar, Pratiksha Kale	2:41
Total length:					12:17

== Critical reception ==
On the review aggregator website Rotten Tomatoes, 40% of 5 critics' reviews are positive, with an average rating of 5/10.
