= Phantom Studios =

Indian film production and distribution company

- Type: Private
- Industry: Entertainment
- Predecessors: AKFPL; Vistaar Religare Film Fund
- Founded: 2010 (founding); 2022 (revival)
- Founders: Madhu Mantena; Anurag Kashyap; Vikas Bahl; Vikramaditya Motwane
- Defunct: 2018 (founding)
- Successors: Good Bad Films; Good Co. Andolan Films
- Headquarters: Mumbai, Maharashtra, India
- Key people: Srishti Behl (CEO); Madhu Mantena; Sheetal Talwar
- Products: Films, content creation, OTT series
- Services: Film production Film distribution, OTT series
- Owner: Vistaar Group
- Website: Phantom Studios

Phantom Studios (formerly Phantom Films) is an Indian film production and distribution company established by Madhu Mantena, Anurag Kashyap, Vikas Bahl, and Vikramaditya Motwane. It was founded in 2011 by all four of them, and was cited as the "directors' company". In March 2015, Reliance Entertainment picked up 50% stake in the company.

The company made its debut in the film industry with its first production, Lootera (2013). Directed by Motwane, the period romance featured actors Ranveer Singh and Sonakshi Sinha in the lead roles. The film was a collaboration with Balaji Motion Pictures, serving as a co-producer. Next year, the company co-produced the romantic comedies Hasee Toh Phasee, starring Parineeti Chopra and Sidharth Malhotra and directed by Vinil Mathew, and Queen, directed by Vikas Bahl and starring Kangana Ranaut and Lisa Haydon. Both films were critical and commercial successes, with the latter also winning the National Film Award for Best Feature Film in Hindi. It was followed by the thrillers Ugly, starring Rahul Bhat and Ronit Roy and directed by Anurag Kashyap, and NH10 (2015), directed by Navdeep Singh and starring Anushka Sharma and Neil Bhopalam. The company went on to produce other critically acclaimed projects like Udta Punjab (2016), starring Alia Bhatt and Shahid Kapoor which was directed by Abhishek Chaubey, and 83 (2021), starring Ranveer Singh and Deepika Padukone which was directed by Kabir Khan.

In March 2022, the company was renamed to "Phantom Studios" with Srishti Behl at the helm as the CEO. The company co-produced the Amazon Prime period drama series Jubilee (2023). The company partnered with AGS Entertainment and co-produced the 2025 Hindi remake of the 2022 Tamil blockbuster Love Today, which was titled Loveyapa and starred Junaid Khan and Khushi Kapoor.

== Establishment ==
Phantom Films was founded in 2011 by Madhu Mantena, Anurag Kashyap, Vikas Bahl, and Vikramaditya Motwane, and was cited as the "directors' company". The idea to start their own production house came to mind because of their "constant struggle in convincing producers" every time to believe in the kind of cinema they make.

== Films ==
The company's first film was Motwane's period romance Lootera, starring Ranveer Singh and Sonakshi Sinha. Based on O. Henry's short story, The Last Leaf, the film received high critical acclaim upon release, with particular praise directed towards Sinha and Singh's performance.

Phantom films then went on to collaborate with Karan Johar's Dharma Productions to produce the romantic comedy Hasee Toh Phasee. Starring Parineeti Chopra and Sidharth Malhotra and, the film was directed by the debutant Vinil Mathew. It was followed by the Vikas Bahl-directed comedy-drama Queen, starring Kangana Ranaut and Lisa haydon. The film was a critical and commercial success, it also won the National Film Award for Best Feature Film in Hindi. Ugly, a drama thriller was the next production venture of Phantom, directed by Anurag Kashyap starring Rahul Bhat and Ronit Roy, which premiered in the Director's Fortnight section of the 2013 Cannes Festival.

In 2015, the company produced Anushka Sharma's NH10, which was directed by Navdeep Singh and the coming of age comedy Hunterrr was directed by Harshvardhan Kulkarni, starring Gulshan Devaiah and Radhika Apte. Both films proved to be a success by critics and audiences. Bombay Velvet which was directed by Anurag Kashyap, a period film set in Bombay in the 1960s was next on the release radar, based on the Princeton University Historian Gyan Prakash's book Mumbai Fables the film stars Ranbir Kapoor and Anushka Sharma. Neeraj Ghaywan's Masaan was Phantom's fourth release of the year, the film marked Vicky Kaushal's debut where he starred alongside Richa Chadda. The film won the FIPRESCI Award and the Promising Future award at the 2015 Cannes Film Festival. Phantom Films continued exploring genres with Vikas Bahl's Shaandaar (2015), starring Alia Bhatt and Shahid Kapoor.

In February 2016, Phantom Films announced that they will co-produce three Gujarati films with Cine Man Productions, a Gujarat-based production company co-founded by Abhishek Jain. Phantom's first release that year was Udta Punjab, a crime drama from the director Abhishek Chaubey starring Kareena Kapoor, Shahid Kapoor, Alia Bhatt and Dilijit Dosanjh, the film documents the substance abuse endemic in the Indian state of Punjab. The film generated controversy when the Central Board of Film Certification demanded extensive censorship before its theatrical release, citing that the portrayal of Punjab in it was negative after the producers of the film filed a lawsuit against the board, the Bombay High Court cleared the film for exhibition with only 1 scene getting trimmed out in the final draft. It was followed by Raman Raghav 2.0, a thriller directed by Anurag Kashyap based on the notorious serial killer Raman Raghav, starring Nawazuddin Siddiqui and Vicky Kaushal. The film premiered at the 2016 Sydney Film Festival and the 2016 Cannes Film Festival, in the Director's Fortnight section to receive a positive response. The company's final release of the year was the Gujarati film Wrong Side Raju starring Pratik Gandhi and Asif Basra which was directed by Mikhil Musale.

In March 2017, Phantom released Vikramaditya Motwane's survival drama film Trapped starring Rajkumar Rao and Geetanjali Thapa. This was followed by the release of Mukkabaaz in 2018, starring Vineet Kumar Singh and Zoya Hussain which was directed by Anurag Kashyap. The company went on to release 3 movies later that year, starting with Akarsh Khurana's High Jack starring Sumeet Vyas and Mantra, then they released Bhavesh Joshi Superhero starring Harshvardhan Kapoor and Nishikant Kamat directed by Vikramaditya Motwane, and an other Kashyap's release Manmarziyaan starring Abhishek Bachchan, Vicky Kaushal and Taapsee Pannu. That year Phantom also released the neo-noir crime-thriller series Sacred Games starring Saif Ali Khan and Nawazuddin Siddiqui which was co-directed by Anurag Kashyap and Vikramaditya Motwane. Patrick Graham's Ghoul a mini thriller series on Netflix starring Radhika Apte and Manav Kaul. In 2019, Phantom released Super 30 starring Hrithik Roshan and Mrunal Thakur which was directed by Vikas Bahl which was followed by Makrand Mane's Youngraad starring Chaitanya Deore and Shireen Patil. In 2020, they released a comedy-drama; Ghoomketu starring Nawazuddin Siddiqui and Ragini Khanna which was directed by Pushpendra Nath Misra. The company also worked on 83 starring Ranveer Singh and Deepika Padukone which was directed by Kabir Khan. The company was also a co-producer for the 2023 series called Jubilee which was co-produced with Reliance Entertainment starring Aditi Rao Hydari and Aparshakti Khurana which was directed by Vikramaditya Motwane and they worked on the Hindi remake of the Tamil film Love Today (2022) with AGS entertainment.

== Dissolution ==
After an 8-year-long run, the company announced its dissolution on 5 October 2018 due to internal disputes about the alleged MeToo allegations on Bahl by a former Phantom employee, which was reported in 2015. The other three founders, Mantena, Kashyap and Motwane, all issued statements on Twitter confirming the company's disbanding and moving on to independent projects.

== Revival ==
In January 2021, Madhu Mantena and Sheetal Talwar bought out Anurag Kashyap, Vikas Bahl and Vikramaditya Motwane's stakes in Phantom to become equal shareholders in the company with Reliance Entertainment. However, shortly before the release of 83, they sold their shares back to Reliance, making it the sole shareholder of Phantom, and left the company. In March 2022, Mantena and Talwar acquired the Phantom Films as well as its film and television library and some film properties from Reliance. They later brought on Srishti Behl to lead the team as CEO and took on a new persona as Phantom Studios.

The team co-produced the Hindi remake of the 2022 Tamil film Love Today, Loveyapa (2025), starring Junaid Khan and Khushi Kapoor. In October 2024, Mantena divested his 30% stake in Phantom, giving Talwar full control over the company through the Vistaar Group.

== Filmography ==
=== Films produced ===
Year	Film	Director	Cast	Notes
2013	Lootera	Vikramaditya Motwane	Ranveer Singh, Sonakshi Sinha	Co-produced with Balaji Motion Pictures
2014	Hasee Toh Phasee	Vinil Mathew	Sidharth Malhotra, Parineeti Chopra	Co-produced with Dharma Productions
2014	Queen	Vikas Bahl	Kangana Ranaut, Rajkummar Rao, Lisa Haydon	Co-produced with Viacom 18 Motion Pictures
2014	Ugly	Anurag Kashyap	Rahul Bhat, Ronit Roy, Girish Kulkarni, Tejaswini Kolhapure, Vineet Kumar Singh, Surveen Chawla	
2015	NH10	Navdeep Singh	Anushka Sharma, Neil Bhoopalam	Co-produced with Clean Slate Films
2015	Hunterrr	Harshavardhan Kulkarni	Gulshan Devaiah, Radhika Apte	Co-produced with Tailormade Films
2015	Bombay Velvet	Anurag Kashyap	Ranbir Kapoor, Anushka Sharma, Karan Johar	
2015	Masaan	Neeraj Ghaywan	Richa Chadda, Sanjay Mishra, Shweta Tripathi, Vicky Kaushal	Co-produced with Drishyam Films, Macassar Productions, Sikhya Entertainment, Pathé and Arte France Cinéma
2015	Shaandaar	Vikas Bahl	Shahid Kapoor, Alia Bhatt, Pankaj Kapur	Co-produced with Dharma Productions
2016	Udta Punjab	Abhishek Chaubey	Kareena Kapoor, Shahid Kapoor, Alia Bhatt, Diljit Dosanjh	Co-produced with Balaji Motion Pictures
2016	Raman Raghav 2.0	Anurag Kashyap	Nawazuddin Siddiqui, Vicky Kaushal, Sobhita Dhulipala	
2016	Wrong Side Raju	Mikhil Musale	Pratik Gandhi, Asif Basra, Kavi Shastri	Gujarati film Co-produced with CineMan Productions
2017	Trapped	Vikramaditya Motwane	Rajkummar Rao, Geetanjali Thapa	
2018	Mukkabaaz	Anurag Kashyap	Vineet Kumar Singh, Ravi Kishan, Jimmy Shergill	Co-produced with Reliance Entertainment and Colour Yellow Productions
2018	High Jack	Akarsh Khurana	Sumeet Vyas, Mantra, Sonnalli Seygall	
2018	Youngraad	Makrand Mane	Vitthal Patil, Chaitanya Deore	
2018	Bhavesh Joshi Superhero	Vikramaditya Motwane	Harshvardhan Kapoor, Priyanshu Painyuli, Nishikant Kamat	
2018	Manmarziyaan	Anurag Kashyap	Taapsee Pannu, Vicky Kaushal, Abhishek Bachchan	Co-produced with Colour Yellow Productions
2019	Super 30	Vikas Bahl	Hrithik Roshan, Mrunal Thakur	Co-produced with Nadiadwala Grandson Entertainment and Reliance Entertainment
2020	Ghoomketu	Pushpendra Nath Misra	Nawazuddin Siddiqui, Ragini Khanna, Anurag Kashyap	Co-produced with Sony Pictures Networks Productions
2021	83	Kabir Khan	Ranveer Singh, Deepika Padukone, Saqib Saleem, Pankaj Tripathi, Tahir Raj Bhasin, Hardy Sandhu, Ammy Virk	Co-produced with Nadiadwala Grandson Entertainment, KA Production, Vibri Media and Reliance Entertainment
2025	Loveyapa	Advait Chandan	Khushi Kapoor, Junaid Khan, Grusha Kapoor, Ashutosh Rana, Tanvika Parlikar, Kiku Sharda	Co-produced with AGS Entertainment
2026	Laikey Laikaa	Saurabh Gupta	Rasha Thadani, Abhay Verma	Co-produced with N2O Films

=== Films distributed ===
Year	Film	Language	Director	Cast
2014	Katiyabaaz	Hindi	Deepti Kakkar, Fahad Mustafa	Loha Singh, Ritu Maheshwari
2016	Tere Bin Laden: Dead or Alive	Hindi	Abhishek Sharma	Manish Paul, Sikander Kher, Pradhuman Singh Mall, Mia Uyeda, Piyush Mishra
2016	Nannaku Prematho	Telugu	Sukumar	Jr. Ntr, Jagapathi Babu, Rakul Preet Singh

=== Series ===
Year	Series	Director(s)	Original network	Cast	Notes
2018 – 2019	Sacred Games	Anurag Kashyap Vikramaditya Motwane	Netflix	Saif Ali Khan, Nawazuddin Siddiqui, Radhika Apte	
2018	Ghoul	Patrick Graham	Netflix	Radhika Apte, Manav Kaul	Co-produced with Blumhouse Television and Ivanhoe Pictures
2023	Jubilee	Vikramaditya Motwane	Amazon Prime Video	Aparshakti Khurana, Prosenjit Chatterjee, Aditi Rao Hydari, Wamiqa Gabbi	Co-produced with Reliance Entertainment and Andolan Films

== Awards ==
Film/Series	Ceremony	Category	Receipt	Ref.
Lootera	Filmfare Awards	Best Playback Singer (Female)	Monali Thakur	
Lootera	Zee Cine Awards	Best Actress in a Romantic Role	Sonakshi Sinha	
Hasee Toh Phasee	Big Star Entertainment awards	Most Entertaining Actor in a Comedy Film	Parineeti Chopra	
Hasee Toh Phasee	Big Star Entertainment awards	Most Entertaining Actor in a Romantic Film	Siddarth Malhotra	
Hasee Toh Phasee	Big Star Entertainment awards	Best Song of the Year (Jury Prize)	Shekhar Ravjiani, Chinmayi Sripaada, Vishal Dadlani & Amitabh Bhattacharya	
Queen	Producers Guild Film Awards	Best film	Anurag Kashyap, Vikramaditya Motwane, Phantom Films	
Queen	Producers Guild Film Awards	Best Director	Vikas Bahl	
Queen	Producers Guild Film Awards	Best Editing	Anurag Kashyap, Abhijit Kokate	
Queen	IIFA	Best film	Anurag Kashyap, Vikramaditya Motwane, Phantom Films	
Queen	IIFA	Best actress in a lead role	Kangana Ranaut	
Queen	IIFA	Best Screenplay	Vikas Bahl, Chaitally Parmar, Parvee Shaikh	
Queen	IIFA	Best Editing	Anurag Kashyap, Abhijit Kokate	
Queen	Filmfare Awards	Best film	Anurag Kashyap, Vikramaditya Motwane, Phantom Films	
Queen	Filmfare Awards	Best actress	Kangana Ranaut	
Queen	Filmfare Awards	Best Editing	Anurag Kashyap, Abhijit Kokate	
Queen	Filmfare Awards	Best Cinematography	Bobby Singh, Siddhanth Dhawan	
Queen	National Film Awards	Best Feature Film	Vikas Bahl, Phantom Films	
Queen	National Film Awards	Best actress	Kangana Ranaut	
Queen	Screen Awards	Best film	Anurag Kashyap, Vikramaditya Motwane, Phantom Films	
Queen	Screen Awards	Best Director	Vikas Bahl	
Queen	Stardust awards	Best film	Anurag Kashyap, Vikramaditya Motwane, Phantom Films	
Queen	Stardust awards	Best Director	Vikas Bahl	
Queen	Stardust awards	Best actress	Kangana Ranaut	
Ugly	Deauville Asian Film Festival	Jury award	Anurag Kashyap	
Ugly	Puchon International Fantastic Film Festival	Best director	Anurag Kashyap	
NH10	IIFA	Best Performance in a negative role	Darshan Kumaar	
NH10	Big Star Entertainment awards	Most entertaining film	Anushka Sharma, Navdeep Singh	
NH10	Screen awards	Best action	Georg Armin Sauer	
NH10	Star Dust awards	Best Performance by an Actor in a Negative Role	Darshan Kumaar	
NH10	Star Dust awards	Filmmaker of the year	Navdeep Singh	
Bombay Velvet	Filmfare Awards	Best Special Effects	Anish H Mulani	
Masaan	Producers Guild Awards	Best Debut Director	Neeraj Ghaywan	
Masaan	IIFA	Best Debut actor	Vicky Kaushal	
Masaan	2015 Cannes Film Festival	UN Certain Regard FIPRESCI Prize	Neeraj Ghaywan	
Masaan	2015 Cannes Film Festival	UN Certain Regard Avenir Prize	Neeraj Ghaywan	
Masaan	Filmfare Awards	Best Debut Director	Neeraj Ghaywan	
Masaan	Jagran Film Festival	Special Jury Award	Vicky Kaushal	
Masaan	Jagran Film Festival	Best Supporting Actor	Sanjay Mishra	
Masaan	National Film Awards	Best Debut Film of a Director	Neeraj Ghaywan	
Masaan	Screen Awards	Most Promising Debut Actor	Vicky Kaushal	
Masaan	Stardust Awards	Performer of the Year (Female)	Richa Chadha	
Masaan	Zee Cine Awards	Best Debut Actor	Vicky Kaushal	
Masaan	Zee Cine Awards	Best Supporting Actor	Sanjay Mishra	
Masaan	Zee Cine Awards	Best Supporting Actress	Shweta Tripathi	
Masaan	Zee Cine Awards	Best Debut Director	Neeraj Ghaywan	
Shaandaar	Big Star Entertainment awards	Most Entertaining Dance	Alia Bhatt	
Shaandaar	Big Star Entertainment awards	Most Entertaining Actor (Film) Debut (Female)	Sana Kapoor	
Udta Punjab	IIFA	Best actor in a leading role	Shahid Kapoor	
Udta Punjab	IIFA	Best actress in a leading role	Alia Bhatt	
Udta Punjab	IIFA	Best debut actor	Diljit Dosanjh	
Udta Punjab	IIFA	Best Female Playback Singer	Kanika Kapoor	
Udta Punjab	Big Star Entertainment awards	Most Entertaining Film Actress	Alia Bhatt	
Udta Punjab	Big Star Entertainment awards	Most Entertaining Film Actor	Shahid Kapoor	
Udta Punjab	Filmfare Awards	Best actor	Shahid Kapoor	
Udta Punjab	Filmfare Awards	Best debut actor	Diljit Dosanjh	
Udta Punjab	Filmfare Awards	Best actress	Alia Bhatt	
Udta Punjab	Filmfare Awards	Best costume design	Payal Saluja	
Udta Punjab	Screen Awards	Best actress	Alia Bhatt	
Udta Punjab	Stardust Awards	Best Screenplay	Abhishek Chaubey, Sudip Sharma	
Udta Punjab	Zee Cine Awards	Best actress	Alia Bhatt	
Raman Raghav 2.0	Asia Pacific Screen Awards	Best Performance by an Actor	Nawazuddin Siddiqui	
Wrong Side Raju	National Film Award	Best Gujarati Film	Abhishek Jain	
Trapped	Filmfare Awards	Best Actor	Rajkummar Rao	
Trapped	Filmfare Awards	Best Editing	Nitin Baid	
Super 30	Mirchi Music Awards	Best Song Engineer (Recording & Mixing)	Vijay Dayal	
Super 30	Zee Cine Awards	Best actor	Hrithik Roshan	
83	IIFA	Best Lyrics	Kausar Munir	
83	IIFA	Best Story - Adapted	Kabir Khan, Sanjay Puran Singh Chauhan	
83	IIFA	Best Sound Mixing	Ajay Kumar P.B., Manik Batra	
83		Best Supporting Actor / Actress	Tahir Raj Bhasin	
83	Filmfare Awards	Best Actor	Ranveer Singh	
83	Filmfare Awards	Best Lyrics	Kausar Munir	
83	Indian Film Festival Of Melbourne	Best Actor of the Year	Ranveer Singh	
83	Indian Film Festival Of Melbourne	Best Movie of the Year	Kabir Khan, Kabir Khan Films	
Sacred Games	Asian Academy Creative Awards	Best Editing	Aarti Bajaj, Phantom Films, Netflix	
Sacred Games	Asian Academy Creative Awards	Best Direction (Fiction)	Anurag Kashyap, Phantom Films, Netflix	
Sacred Games	Filmfare OTT Awards	Best Cinematography	Sylvester Fonseca, Swapnil S. Sonawane	
Sacred Games	Filmfare OTT Awards	Best Background Music	Alokananda Dasgupta	
