= Mikhil Musale =

Indian film director and producer

- Born: 3 November
- Occupations: Director, Producer
- Years active: 2016–present
- Notable work: Wrong Side Raju
- Relatives: Shraddha Musale (Sister)

Mikhil Musale is a film director from India. In 2010, he founded the film production and distribution company, CineMan Productions, with Abhishek Jain and Anish Shah. Wrong Side Raju is his first film as a director and it won the National Film Award for Best Feature Film in Gujarati at the 64th National Film Awards. In 2019, he debuted in the Bollywood film industry with Made in China, starring Rajkummar Rao, Boman Irani and Mouni Roy.

== Filmography ==
Key
†	Denotes films that have not yet been released

Year	Film	Language	Notes	Ref
2016	Wrong Side Raju	Gujarati	National Film Award for Best Feature Film in Gujarati at the 64th National Film Awards	
2019	Made in China	Hindi	Debut in Hindi cinema	
2023	Sajini Shinde Ka Viral Video	Hindi		

== See also ==
- CineMan Productions
