= 64th National Film Awards =

2017 Indian film award

- Awarded for: Best of Indian cinema in 2016
- Awarded by: Directorate of Film Festivals
- Presented by: Pranab Mukherjee (President of India)
- Announced on: 7 April 2017
- Presented on: 3 May 2017
- Official website: dff.nic.in

Highlights
- Best Feature Film: Kaasav
- Best Non-Feature Film: Fireflies in the Abyss
- Best Book: Lata : Sur Gatha
- Best Film Critic: G. Dhananjayan
- Dadasaheb Phalke Award: K. Viswanath
- Most awards: • Allama • Dashkriya • Ventilator (3)

The 64th National Film Awards was an award ceremony during which the Directorate of Film Festivals presented its annual National Film Awards to honour the best films of 2016 in Indian cinema. The awards were announced on 7 April 2017, and the award ceremony was held on 3 May 2017.

== Selection process ==
The Directorate of Film Festivals invited online entries for the first time on 16 January 2017 and the acceptable last date for entries was until 21 January 2017. Feature and Non-Feature Films certified by the Central Board of Film Certification between 1 January 2016 and 31 December 2016 were eligible for the film award categories. Books, critical studies, reviews or articles on cinema published in Indian newspapers, magazines, and journals between 1 January 2016, and 31 December 2016, were eligible for the best writing on cinema section. Entries of dubbed, revised or copied versions of a film or translation, abridgements, edited or annotated works and reprints were ineligible for the awards.

For the Feature and Non-Feature Films sections, films in any Indian language, shot on 16 mm, 35 mm, a wider film gauge or a digital format, and released in cinemas, on video or digital formats for home viewing were eligible. Films were required to be certified as a feature film, a featurette or a Documentary/Newsreel/Non-Fiction by the Central Board of Film Certification.

== Best Film-Friendly State ==
The awards aim at encouraging study and appreciation of cinema as an art form and dissemination of information and critical appreciation of this art-form through a state government policy.

- Jury members

• Madhur Bhandarkar (Chairperson)
• Kaushik Ganguly
• Radhakrishna Jagarlamudi
• Mohan Kanda

Award	Name of State	Citation
Best Film Friendly State	State of Uttar Pradesh	For implementing a unique film policy, taking into account that the film medium is not only about entertainment but is also a very important vehicle of employment, social awareness and cultural development. The State's Film Policy includes various measures to create a suitable environment, which not only invites shooting of films on a large scale in the State but also promotes other activities, which are related to various aspects of film production at the ground level, including financial incentives for filmmakers.
Best Film Friendly State – Special Mention	State of Jharkhand	To foster the film Industry and their endeavour to give incentives to filmmakers from across India. In addition to the above, the Film Policy also provides growth opportunities to the local filmmaking talent from within the State.

=== Golden Lotus Award ===
Official name: Swarna Kamal

All awardees weee awarded with the 'Golden Lotus Award (Swarna Kamal)'.

== Dadasaheb Phalke Award ==
Introduced in 1969, the Dadasaheb Phalke Award is the highest award given to recognise the contributions of film personalities towards the development of Indian cinema and for distinguished contributions to the medium, its growth and promotion."

A committee consisting five eminent personalities from Indian film industry was appointed to evaluate the lifetime achievement award, Dadasaheb Phalke Award. Following were the jury members:

- Jury members

• Manoj Kumar
• Asha Bhosle
• T. S. Nagabharana
• Kamal Haasan
• S. P. Balasubrahmanyam

Name of Award	Image	Awardee(s)	Awarded As	Awards
Dadasaheb Phalke Award		K. Viswanath	Filmmaker	Swarna Kamal, ₹1 million (US$10,000) and a shawl

== Feature films ==
Feature films will be awarded at All India as well as regional level. Following will be the awards given in each category:

=== Jury ===
For the Feature Film section, six committees were formed based on the different geographic regions in India. The two-tier evaluation process included a central committee and five regional committees. The central committee, headed by the director Priyadarshan, included the heads of each regional committee and five other jury members. At regional level, each committee consisted of one chief and four members. The chief and one non-chief member of each regional committee were selected from outside that geographic region. The table below names the jury members for the central and regional committees:

Central jury

• Priyadarshan (Chairperson)
• N. Chandra	• Vasant S. Sai
• K. J. Suresh	• Imo Singh
• Girish Mohite	• Deboshruti Roy Chowdhury
• C. V. Reddy	• P. C. Reddy
• Ashok Rane	• Devdas Chhottrey

Northern region: (Bhojpuri, Dogri, English, Hindi, Punjabi, Rajasthani, Urdu)

• K. J. Suresh (Head)
• Rakesh Mittal	• Advaita Kala
• C. Umamaheswara Rao	• S. S. Bhakhoo

Eastern region: (Assamese, Bengali, Oriya and North-Eastern dialects)

• Shyamaprasad (Head)
• Sanjeev Hazarika	• Tanushree Hazarika
• Girish Mohite	• Jagora Bandyopadhyay

Western region: (Gujarati, Konkani, Marathi)

• N. Chandra (Head)
• Sanjay Pawar	• B. Diwakar
• Pramod Pawar	• Gopi Desai

Southern region I: (Malayalam, Tamil)

• Imo Singh (Head)
• R. S. Vimal	• Balaji Sakthivel
• Suresh Chandra	• Priya Krishnaswamy

Southern region II: (Kannada, Telugu)

• Vasant S. Sai (Head)
• G. Bhageeradha	• K. S. Ramesh
• H. N. Maruthi	• Aslam Sheikh

=== All India Award ===
Following will be the awards given:

==== Golden Lotus Award ====
Official name: Swarna Kamal

All the awardees were awarded with the 'Golden Lotus Award (Swarna Kamal)', a certificate and cash prize.

Name of Award	Name of Film	Language	Awardee(s)	Cash prize
Best Feature Film	Kaasav	Marathi	Director(s): Sumitra Bhave–Sunil Sukthankar; Producer(s): • Sumitra Bhave–Sunil Sukthankar • Mohan Agashe	₹ 250,000/- Each
Best Debut Film of a Director	Alifa	Bengali	Director: Deep Choudhury; Producer: Arman Ahmed	₹ 125,000/- Each
Best Popular Film Providing Wholesome Entertainment	Sathamanam Bhavati	Telugu	Producer: V. Venkata Ramana Reddy; Director: Satish Vegesna	₹ 200,000/- Each
Best Children's Film	Dhanak	Hindi	Director: Nagesh Kukunoor; Producer: Drishyam Films	₹ 150,000/- Each
Best Direction	Ventilator	Marathi	Rajesh Mapuskar	₹ 250,000/-
Best Animated Film	Mahayodha Rama	Hindi	Producer: Contiloe Pictures Pvt. Ltd. Director: Rohit Vaid; Animator: Deepak S. V.	₹ 100,000/- Each

==== Silver Lotus Award ====
Official name: Rajat Kamal

All the awardees were awarded with the 'Silver Lotus Award (Rajat Kamal)', a certificate and cash prize.

Name of Award	Name of Film	Language	Awardee(s)	Cash prize
Best Feature Film on National Integration	Dikchow Banat Palaax	Assamese	Producer: Canvascope; Director: Sanjib Sabha Pandit	₹ 150,000/- Each
Best Film on Other Social Issues	Pink	Hindi	Producer: Rashmi Sharma Films; Director: Aniruddha Roy Chowdhury	₹ 150,000/- Each
Best Film on Environment/Conservation/Preservation	Loktak Lairembee	Manipuri	Producer and Director: Haobam Paban Kumar	₹ 150,000/- Each
Best Actor	Rustom	Hindi	Akshay Kumar	₹ 50,000/-
Best Actress	Minnaminungu	Malayalam	Surabhi Lakshmi	₹ 50,000/-
Best Supporting Actor	Dashakriya	Marathi	Manoj Joshi	₹ 50,000/-
Best Supporting Actress	Dangal	Hindi	Zaira Wasim	₹ 50,000/-
Best Child Artist	Railway Children	Kannada	Manohara K	₹ 50,000/- (Cash component to be shared)
Best Child Artist	Sahaj Paather Gappo	Bengali	• Nur Islam • Samiul Alam	₹ 50,000/- (Cash component to be shared)
Best Child Artist	Kunju Daivam	Malayalam	Adish Praveen	₹ 50,000/- (Cash component to be shared)
Best Male Playback Singer	Joker (For the song "Jasmine E")	Tamil	Sundarayyar	₹ 50,000/-
Best Female Playback Singer	Praktan (For the song "Tumi Jaake Bhalobasho")	Bengali	Iman Chakraborty	₹ 50,000/-
Best Cinematography	24	Tamil	Tirru	₹ 50,000/-
Best Screenplay • Screenplay Writer (Original)	Maheshinte Prathikaaram	Malayalam	Syam Pushkaran	₹ 50,000/-
Best Screenplay • Screenplay Writer (Adapted)	Dashakriya	Marathi	Sanjay Krishnaji Patil	₹ 50,000/-
Best Screenplay • Dialogues	Pelli Choopulu	Telugu	Tharun Bhascker Dhaassyam	₹ 50,000/-
Best Audiography • Sound designer	Kaadu Pookkunna Neram	Malayalam	Jayadevan Chakka Dath	₹ 50,000/-
Best Audiography • Re-recordist of the Final Mixed Track	Ventilator	Marathi	Alok De	₹ 50,000/-
Best Editing	Ventilator	Marathi	Rameshwar S. Bhagat	₹ 50,000/-
Best Production Design	24	Tamil	• Subrata Chakraborthy • Shreyas Khedekar • Amit Ray	₹ 50,000/-
Best Costume Design	Cycle	Marathi	Sachin Lovalekar	₹ 50,000/-
Best Make-up Artist	Allama	Kannada	N. K. Ramakrishna	₹ 50,000/-
Best Music Direction • Songs	Allama	Kannada	Bapu Padmanabha	₹ 50,000/-
Best Music Direction • Background Score	Allama	Kannada	Bapu Padmanabha	₹ 50,000/-
Best Lyrics	Praktan (For the song "Tumi Jaake Bhalobasho")	Bengali	Anupam Roy	₹ 50,000/- (Cash Component To Be Shared)
Best Lyrics	Dharma Durai (For the song "Entha Pakkam")	Tamil	Vairamuthu	₹ 50,000/- (Cash Component To Be Shared)
Best Special Effects	Shivaay	Hindi	Naveen Paul	₹ 50,000/-
Best Choreography	Janatha Garage	Telugu	Raju Sundaram	₹ 50,000/-
Best Stunt Choreographer	Pulimurugan	Malayalam	Peter Hein	₹ 50,000/-
Special Jury Award	• Munthirivallikal Thalirkkumbol • Janatha Garage • Pulimurugan	• Malayalam • Telugu • Malayalam	Mohanlal	₹ 200,000/-
Special Mention	Kadvi Hawa	Hindi	Producer: Eleeanora Images Private Ltd. Director: Nila Madhab Panda	Certificate only
Special Mention	Mukti Bhawan	Hindi	Producer: Red Carpet Moving Pictures; Director: Shubhashish Bhutiani	Certificate only
Special Mention	• Mukti Bhawan • Maj Rati Keteki	Hindi; Assamese	Adil Hussain	Certificate only
Special Mention	Neerja	Hindi	Sonam Kapoor	Certificate only

=== Regional awards ===
National Film Awards are also given to the best films in the regional languages of India. Awards for the regional languages are categorised as per their mention in the eighth schedule of the Constitution of India. Awardees included producers and directors of the film. No films in languages other than those specified in the Schedule VIII of the Constitution were eligible.

Name of Award	Name of Film	Awardee(s)		Cash prize
Name of Award	Name of Film	Producer(s)	Director	Cash prize
Best Feature Film in Assamese	Maj Rati Keteki	Udara Films	Santwana Bardoloi	₹ 100,000/- Each
Best Feature Film in Bengali	Bisarjan	M/s Opera	Kaushik Ganguly	₹ 100,000/- Each
Best Feature Film in Gujarati	Wrong Side Raju	Cineman Productions Ltd.	Mikhil Musale	₹ 100,000/- Each
Best Feature Film in Hindi	Neerja	Fox Star Studios India Pvt. Ltd.	Ram Madhvani	₹ 100,000/- Each
Best Feature Film in Kannada	Reservation	Thotadamane	Nikhil Manjoo	₹ 100,000/- Each
Best Feature Film in Konkani	K Sera Sera – Ghodpachem Ghoddtelem	de Goan Studio	Rajiv Shinde	₹ 100,000/- Each
Best Feature Film in Malayalam	Maheshinte Prathikaaram	Dream Mill Cinemas and Entertainment Pvt. Ltd.	Dileesh Pothan	₹ 100,000/- Each
Best Feature Film in Marathi	Dashakriya	Rangneel Creations	Sandeep Bhalachandra Patil	₹ 100,000/- Each
Best Feature Film in Tamil	Joker	Dream Warrior Pictures	Raju Murugan	₹ 100,000/- Each
Best Feature Film in Telugu	Pelli Choopulu	Dharamapatha Creations and Big Ben Cinemas	Tharun Bhascker Dhaassyam	₹ 100,000/- Each

Best Feature Film in Each of the Language Other Than Those Specified in the Schedule VIII of the Constitution

Name of Award	Name of Film	Awardee(s)		Cash prize
Name of Award	Name of Film	Producer	Director	Cash prize
Best Feature Film in Moran	Haanduk	Mayamara Production	Jaicheng Jai Dohutia	₹ 100,000/- Each
Best Feature Film in Tulu	Madipu	Aastha Production	Chethan Mundadi	₹ 100,000/- Each

== Non-feature films ==
Short Films made in any Indian language and certified by the central board of Film Certification as a documentary/newsreel/fiction are eligible for non-feature film section.

=== Jury ===
A committee of seven, headed by Raju Mishra, was appointed to evaluate the Non-Feature Films entries. The jury members were:

• Raju Mishra (Chairperson)
• Ashok Sharan	• M. C. Rajanarayanan
• M. Maniram	• Sanjeev Ratan
• Preethi Tripathi	• Sushmit Ghosh

=== Golden Lotus Award ===
Official name: Swarna Kamal

All awardees were awarded with the 'Golden Lotus Award (Swarna Kamal)', a certificate and cash prize.

Name of Award	Name of Film	Language	Awardee(s)	Cash prize
Best Non-Feature Film	Fireflies in the Abyss	English	Producer: Chandrasekhar Reddy; Director: Chandrasekhar Reddy	₹ 100,000/- Each
Best Director in Non-Feature Film	Aaba... Aiktaay Na?	Marathi	Producer: Shri Mahalasa Productions Ponda; Director: Aaditya Jambhale	₹ 150,000/- to the Director

=== Silver Lotus Award ===
Official name: Rajat Kamal

All the awardees were awarded with the 'Silver Lotus Award (Rajat Kamal)' and cash prize.

Name of Award	Name of Film	Language	Awardee(s)	Cash prize
Best First Non-Feature Film	SOZ...A Ballad of Maladies	Hindi	Producer: Rajiv Mehrotra, PSBT; Director: Tushar Madhav & Sarvnik Kaur	₹ 50,000/- Each
Best Biographical Film / Best Historical Reconstruction / Compilation Film	Zikr Us Parivaksha: Begum Akhtar	Urdu	Producer: Sangeet Natak Akademi; Director: Nirmal Chander	₹ 50,000/- Each
Best Arts / Cultural Film	In the Shadow of Time	English	Producer: Indira Gandhi National Centre for the Arts; Director: Shankhajeet Dey	₹ 50,000/- Each (Cash Component to be shared)
Best Arts / Cultural Film	The Lord of the Universe	English	Producer and Director: Shibu Prusty	₹ 50,000/- Each (Cash Component to be shared)
Best Environment Film including Best Agricultural Film	The Tiger Who Crossed The Line	English	Producer and Director: Krishnendu Bose	₹ 50,000/- Each
Best Film on Social Issues	I am Jeeja	English	Producer: Rajiv Mehrotra; Director: Swaty Chakraborty	₹ 50,000/- Each (Cash Component to be shared)
Best Film on Social Issues	Sanath	Hindi	Producer: Priya Arun; Director: Vasanth S. Sai	₹ 50,000/- Each (Cash Component to be shared)
Best Educational / Motivational / Instructional Film	The Water Fall	English	Producer: Syed Sultan Ahmed; Director: Lipika Singh Darai	₹ 50,000/- Each
Best Exploration / Adventure Film	Matitali Kusti	Marathi	Producer: Madhavi Reddy; Director: Prantik Vivek Deshmukh	₹ 50,000/- Each
Best Investigative Film	Placebo	English	Producer: Archana Fadke; Director: Abhay Kumar	₹ 50,000/- Each
Best Animation Film	Hum Chitra Banate Hai	Hindi	Producer: IDC, IIT Mumbai; Director: Nina Sabnani; Animator: Piyush Varma And Shyam Sundar Chatterjee	₹ 50,000/- Each
Best Short Fiction Film	Aaba	English	Producer: Raj Kumar Gupta; Director: Amar Kaushik	₹ 50,000/- Each
Best Film on Family Welfare	Little Magician	English	Producer: Syed Sultan Ahmed; Director: Neha Sharma	₹ 50,000/- Each
Best Cinematography	Kalpvriksha; Adnyat	Hindi; English	Cameraman: Alpesh Nagar; Cameraman: Vishal Sangwai	₹ 50,000/- Each
Best Audiography	In Return Just A Book	English	Ajith Abraham George	₹ 50,000/-
Best Audiography • Location Sound Recordist	Remembering Kurdi	English	Christopher Bhurchell	₹ 50,000/-
Best Editing	Gudh	English	Jishu Sen	₹ 50,000/-
Best Music Direction	Leeches	Hindi, English	Tanuj Tiku	₹ 50,000/-
Best Narration / Voice over	Makino	English	Setsu Makino Togawa	₹ 50,000/- Each
Special Jury Award	The Cinema Travellers	English	Producer: Shirley Abraham; Director: Shirely Abraham	₹ 50,000/- Each
Special Mention	Chembai: Descoperire A Mei Unai Legende Chembai My discovery of a legend (Documentary)	English	Soumya Sadanandan	Certificate
Special Mention	Sikar Aru Sitkar	Assamese	Ramen Borah and Sibanu Borah	Certificate
Special Mention	The Eyes of Darkness	English	Amitabh Parashar	Certificate

== Best Writing on Cinema ==
The awards aim at encouraging study and appreciation of cinema as an art form and dissemination of information and critical appreciation of this art-form through publication of books, articles, reviews etc.

=== Jury ===
A committee of three, headed by the National Award-winning writer Bhavana Somaya was appointed to evaluate the nominations for the best writing on Indian cinema. The jury members were as follows:

• Bhavana Somaya (Chairperson)
• Mohan V. Raman	• Prabhat Kumar

=== Golden Lotus Award ===
Official name: Swarna Kamal

All the awardees are awarded with the Golden Lotus Award (Swarna Kamal) accompanied with a cash prize.

Name of Award	Name of Book	Language	Awardee(s)	Cash prize
Best Book on Cinema	Sur Gatha	Hindi	Author: Yatindra Mishra Publisher: Vani Prakashan	₹ 75,000/- Each
Best Film Critic	NA	English	G. Dhananjayan	₹ 75,000/-
Special Mention (Book on Cinema)	A Fly in the Curry	English	Author: K. P. Jayashankar & Anjali Monteiro	Certificate Only

== Controversy ==
There was controversy over the National Film Award for Best Actor, which the committee awarded to Akshay Kumar for his performance in Rustom, possibly over Aamir Khan's performance for Dangal. Committee member Priyadarshan, who has worked with Kumar on several films, gave the following explanation for not considering Khan for the award: "Why should we have given the Best Actor award to Aamir Khan when he has made it very clear that he doesn't attend awards functions?" He further noted Kumar was "every bit as meritorious".
