= Dhruv Bhatt =

Gujarati novelist and poet

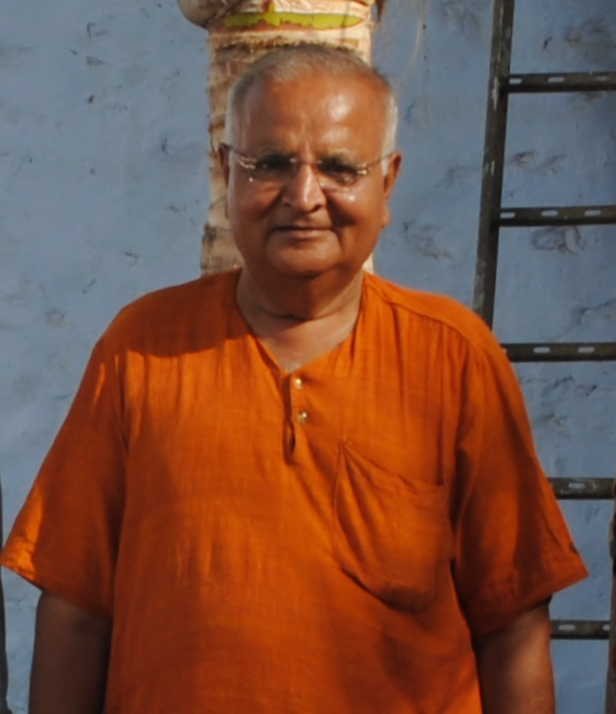
- Dhruv Bhatt
- Born: Dhruv Prabodhray Bhatt; 8 May 1947 (age 79); Ningala, Bhavnagar, Gujarat, British Raj
- Occupations: Poet, novelist
- Writing career
- Language: Gujarati
- Period: Post-modern Gujarati literature
- Genres: Novel, Geet
- Notable works: Samudrantike (1993); Tattvamasi (1998); Karnalok (2005)
- Notable awards: Sahitya Akademi Award (2002)

Dhruv Bhatt is a Gujarati language novelist and poet from Gujarat, India.

== Life ==
Dhruv Bhatt was born on 8 May 1947 in Ningala village of Bhavnagar State (now Bhavnagar district, Gujarat) to Prabodhray Bhatt and Harisuta Bhatt. He studied at various places, standard 1 to 4 at Jafrabad and Matriculation from Keshod. After studying commerce for two years, he left further studying in 1972 and joined Gujarat Machine Manufacturers as Sales Supervisor. He voluntary retired and started writing career.

He married Divya Bhatt. His son Devavrat is born in 1976 while his daughter, Shivani, in 1980.

== Works ==
He has written a teen novel, Khovayelu Nagar (1984). His Agnikanya (1988) is a novel centered on Draupadi of epic Mahabharata. He received recognition for his novels, Samudrantike (1993) and Tattvamasi (1998). His other novels are Atarapi (2001), Karnalok (2005), Akoopar (2011), Lovely Pan House (2012) and Timirpanthi (2015). Gay Tena Geet (2003) and Shrunvantu are poetry collections.

Samudrantike is a novel on seafaring off the coast of Saurashtra. He travelled from Gopinath to Dwarka via Mahuva, Jafarabad, Diu and Somnath and its experience formed the novel in autobiographical style. The novel was translated into English by Vinod Meghani in 2001 as Oceanside Blues.

Tattvamasi is centered on protagonist working in a tribal village on the banks of Narmada River.

Adaptation

His novel Akoopar has been adapted into a play directed by Aditi Desai. Tattvamasi was adapted into the 2018 Gujarati film Reva.

== Recognition ==
He received Darshak Foundation Award in 2005. He also received awards from Gujarati Sahitya Parishad for Gay Tena Geet and from Gujarat Sahitya Akademi for Atarapi and Karnalok.

He won the Sahitya Akademi Award in 2002 for his novel Tattvamasi (1998).
