= CineMan Productions =

Indian film production and distribution company

- Type: Private
- Industry: Entertainment
- Founded: February 2010
- Founders: Abhishek Jain; Mikhil Musale; Anish Shah
- Headquarters: Ahmedabad, Gujarat, India
- Products: Films
- Services: Film production Film distribution Advertisement production
- Owners: Abhishek Jain
- Website: CineMan Productions

CineMan Productions is an Indian film production and distribution company established by Abhishek Jain, Mikhil Musale, and Anish Shah. It was founded in 2010.

== History ==
Abhishek Jain, Mikhil Musale and Anish Shah met during an international film festival in Ahmedabad and founded CineMan productions in 2010. However, Shah left the company later on. The first film produced by the company was Jain's directorial debut, Kevi Rite Jaish. The production subsequently produced the 2014 film Bey Yaar. The productions also has produced advertisements for various brands such as Cinepolis among others.

=== Collaboration with Phantom films ===
Abhishek Jain had approached Anurag Kashyap to produce Kevi Rite Jaish; although Kashyap was impressed with the script, the collaboration did not work out for the film. Later in February 2016, Abhishek Jain announced that CineMan will co-produce three Gujarati films with Anurag Kashyap's Phantom Films, out of which one will be directed by Abhishek himself. The first film to be released under the joint banner of CineMan productions and Phantom films was Wrong Side Raju, directed by Mikhil Musale.

=== OHO Gujarati ===
CineMan Productions and Khushi Advertising launched Gujarati language streaming platform OHO Gujarati in May 2021. The first original show released on the platform was Vitthal Teedi, a drama series starring Pratik Gandhi and directed by Jain. However, the platform did not thrive and the content library was acquired by ShemarooMe in 2026.

== Filmography ==
=== Films ===
Year	Film	Director	Co-production company(s)	Cast
2012	Kevi Rite Jaish	Abhishek Jain		Divyang Thakkar, Veronica Kalpana Gautam, Tom Alter, Anang Desai
2014	Bey Yaar	Abhishek Jain		Manoj Joshi, Darshan Jariwala, Divyang Thakkar, Pratik Gandhi, Samvedna Suwalka
2016	Wrong Side Raju	Mikhil Musale	Phantom Films	Pratik Gandhi, Kimberley Louisa McBeath, Asif Basra, Kavi Shastri
2016	Shubh Aarambh	Amit Barot	The Travelling Circus	Harsh Chhaya, Prachee Shah Paandya, Bharat Chawda, Deeksha Joshi, Aarjav Trivedi
2026	Maaran	Abhishek Jain		Yash Soni, Deeksha Joshi, Shruhad Goswami, Tarjanee Bhadla, Dhairya Thakkar, Abhinay Banker

=== TV series ===
Year	Seasons	Episodes	Show	Director	Cast	Notes	Network
2021–	1	6	Vitthal Teedi	Abhishek Jain	Pratik Gandhi, Ragi Jani, Brinda Trivedi	Web series	OHO Gujarati
2021	1	5	Tuition	Pratik Parmar	Dhairya Thakkar, Sohni Bhatt	Web series	OHO Gujarati
2021–2022	3	15	Cutting	Pratik Rajen Kothari	Mayur Chauhan, Hemang Shah	Web Series	OHO Gujarati
2021	1	5	Ok Boss	Kewal Mistry	Aarohi Patel, Arjav Trivedi, Hemang Dave	Web Series	OHO Gujarati
2022–2023	2	8	Bhamara	Vainat Desai	Sanjay Galsar, Smit Joshi, Shruhad Goswami, Pratik Rathod	Web Series	OHO Gujarati

== Awards ==
Film/Series	Ceremony	Category	Receipt	Ref.
Wrong Side Raju	National Film Award	Best Gujarati Film	Abhishek Jain	
Maaran	National Film Award	Best Gujarati Film	Abhishek Jain	
