= Kevi Rite Jaish =

2012 Gujarati language film directed by Abhishek Jain

- Official poster
- Directed by: Abhishek Jain
- Written by: Abhishek Jain; Anish Shah
- Produced by: Nayan Jain
- Starring: Rakesh Bedi; Anang Desai; Sanika raghawa Kenneth Desai; Tom Alter; Divyang Thakkar; Veronica Gautam
- Cinematography: Pushkar Singh
- Edited by: Manan Mehta
- Music by: Mehul Surti; Vishvesh Parmar
- Production company: CineMan Productions
- Distributed by: CineMan Productions
- Release dates: 15 June 2012 (India); 31 August 2012 (United States)
- Running time: 128 minutes
- Country: India
- Language: Gujarati
- Budget: ₹1.75 crore (US$180,000)

Kevi Rite Jaish is a 2012 Indian Gujarati-language drama film directed by Abhishek Jain and produced by Nayan Jain. The film is a satire on the fascination and obsession of the Patels' – a Gujarati farmer community – migration to the U.S. Over the last half century, thousands of Patels have migrated to the US and have come to dominate its motel industry. The film stars Divyang Thakkar, Veronica Kalpana-Gautam, Tejal Panchasara, Kenneth Desai, Anang Desai and Sanika raghawa. The success of the film started a "new wave" in Gujarati cinema.

== Plot ==
In a flashback, Bachu (Kenneth Desai) and Ishwar (Anang Desai) are close friends who dream of going to the USA together illegally, though Bachu doesn't have enough money yet. One day, Bachu receives a phone call from Ishwar saying he has managed to reach the US. Bachu feels betrayed and starts resenting his friend.

In the present, Bachu has two sons, Jignesh and Harish (Divyang Thakkar). Jignesh is married and expecting a child. The younger son, Harish, just like his father, dreams to go to the US, one way or another. Bachu wants to realize his own dream through his son. Harish applies for a visa, but is rejected due to his inability to give satisfactory answers to the visa officer, Derek Thomas (Tom Alter). Meanwhile, Ishwar returns to India with his daughter, Aayushi (Veronica Kalpana-Gautam). Ishwar is now very successful in the United States; he has a chain of motels and is now known as the Motel King. His purpose is to invest in Gujarat and ultimately return to his motherland and settle there. Bachu still resents his old friend, but Harish falls in love with Aayushi, in spite of his father warning against it. Harish's friend, Raheel, introduces him to his acquaintance, Kaivan (who has changed his name to Kevin), who is soon going to the US, and introduces him to his travel agent, Daulatram Chainani (Rakesh Bedi). Chainani assures Harish and his father that he'll groom Harish and make sure he gets the visa, but will need money, to which his brother, Jignesh promises that he'll arrange for enough funds. Jignesh borrows money from less-than-legal elements, who are now threatening him unless he returns the money soon. In a party arranged by Kevin, one of his friends warns Aayushi about Kevin, saying that he is not a reliable man and is going to the US by using someone else's sponsorship papers. When drunk, Aayushi warns Harish about Kevin, but Harish dismisses her concerns. One day, Harish finds out about the illegal racket Chainani is running for illegal entry to the US. Chainani also reveals that Kevin used Harish's sponsorship papers to reach the US. When all hope is lost, one of Bachu's acquaintances informs him that he has managed a fake passport using which Harish can travel to the US; Bachu and Harish agree to that. Jignesh confronts his father for always shooting him down as dafol (stupid) and threatens to sever ties with the family. At the same time there are complications in Jignesh's wife pregnancy and is admitted to the hospital.

When Harish is travelling to the airport with his friends to leave for the US via the fake passport, they are assaulted by people from whom Jignesh had borrowed money from. Harish manages to escape and reaches the airport and is bade farewell by his parents. When Bachu returns to his house, Ishwar confronts him and tell him about his life and struggles as an illegal immigrant and hardships he had to endure before being the Motel King. Bachu realizes his mistake and they rush to the airport to stop Harish, only to find that Harish, touched by the plight of an old lady (Rita Bhaduri), deliberately did not board the flight as he decided to stay with parents, friends, and Aayushi. Bachu apologizes to his son Jignesh and the family is reunited.

In epilogue, it's revealed that Harish and Aayushi are married and they're looking for their options for a honeymoon; Harish is still insistent on going to the US for it.

== Cast ==
- Divyang Thakkar as Harish Patel
- Veronica Kalpana-Gautam as Aayushi Patel
- Tom Alter as Uncle Sam / Derek Thomas
- Rakesh Bedi as Daulatram Chainani
- Rita Bhaduri as Old Lady
- Anang Desai as Ishwarbhai Patel
- Abhinay Banker as Raheel
- Siddharth Amit Bhavsar as Kevin
- Aakash Maheriya as Mehul
- Abhishek Jain as Kevin's friend
- Tejal Panchasara as Bhavna Jignesh Patel
- Kenneth Desai as Bachubhai Patel
- Raju Barot as Old Man
- Jay Upadhyay as Jignesh Patel
- Dipti Joshi as Jyotsnaben Bachubhai Patel
- Hemin Trivedi as match maker
- Malhar Thakar as Guy at VISA office

== Production ==
=== Development ===
The director, Abhishek Jain, is an alumnus of Whistling Woods. After finishing the course, he assisted Sanjay Leela Bhansali and Subhash Ghai on Saawariya and Yuvvraaj respectively. Then he moved to Ahmedabad and made a Gujarati film. Abhishek Jain approached Anurag Kashyap to produce the film; although Kashyap was impressed with the script, the collaboration did not work out for the film. Divyang Thakkar, the protagonist of the film, has mentioned it as "natural progression to do a local film, rather than try" his "luck in a Bollywood film immediately." Veronica Kalpana Gautam (from Surat) was discovered as the lead female via Facebook and considered the film "path breaking". Anang Desai, although being a Gujarati, had never acted in a Gujarati movie until Kevi Rite Jaish as he said he "was waiting for a project that I can connect with".

=== Filming ===
The director of photography, Pushkar Singh, visited Ahmedabad a year before the principal shooting to understand the lighting conditions of the city and made a video as part of the pre-production. The film was filmed with a RED Camera in Ahmedabad, Gujarat. This is the first time a RED Camera has been used in India for regional films. The film is shot mostly in Ahmedabad at 34 locations. The shooting of the film was completed in 23 days.

One of the scenes in the party sequence required more than 500 empty liquor bottles and Gujarat, where the principal shooting took place, has alcohol prohibition, so the art director Taj Naqvi and his team started scouting for it 8 days prior to the schedule. 'ravi vaari bajaar' to posh hotels, residence to open grounds they collected these bottles and on the day of the shoot managed to get 731 empty liquor bottles. To avoid any police suspicion, the bottles were transported during the night and the art director Taj Naqvi ended up doing a cameo as a bartender in the movie. The casting director, Abhinay Banker, ended up auditioning for the protagonist's friend, Raheel, and was selected to play the role. The female protagonist, Veronica Kalpana-Gautam, is introduced in the film in slow motion as a tribute to Martin Scorsese; he often introduces his blonde heroines in idealizing slow-motion shots, as a possible tribute to Alfred Hitchcock.

== Soundtrack ==
Kevi Rite Jaish

Soundtrack album by Mehul Surti, Vishvesh Parmar
- Released: 26 May 2012
- Genre: Feature film soundtrack
- Length: 39:58

Kevi Rite Jaish features songs sung by Roop Kumar Rathod, Suraj Jagan, Vishvesh Parmar, Parthiv Gohil, Mehul Surti, Aishwarya Majmudar and Aman Lekhadia for the film. The sound track was launched on 26 May 2012 at Ahmedabad. The album was made available for free to download on the official website. The response to the music has been very positive, with the soundtrack being described as soulful and praised for lyrics, especially Pankhida, the rock version of a popular garba song of the same name, which was a viral hit.

Track list
No.	Title	Lyrics	Music	Singer(s)	Length
1.	"Kevi Rite Jaish"	Jainesh Panchal	Mehul Surti	Roop Kumar Rathod	4:43
2.	"Pankhida"	Jainesh Panchal	Vishvesh Parmar	Suraj Jagan	3:55
3.	"Aa Safar"	Raeesh Maniar	Mehul Surti	Parthiv Gohil, Aishwarya Majmudar	4:19
4.	"Kharekhar"	Jainesh Panchal	Vishvesh Parmar	Vishvesh Parmar	5:16
5.	"Rang Rangili"	Raeesh Maniar	Mehul Surti	Dhvanit Thaker	2:30
6.	"Kaya Karano Thi"	Vivek Taylor	Mehul Surti	Mehul Surti	5:41
7.	"Bheeni Bheeni"	Raeesh Maniar	Mehul Surti	Aishwarya Majmudar	5:28
8.	"Kevi Rite Jaish (Instrumental)"		Mehul Surti	Sandeep Kulkarni	5:06
9.	"Kevi Rite Jaish (Unplugged)"		Mehul Surti	Aman Lekhadia	3:00

== Release ==
The official poster for the film was released on 28 April 2012. The first trailer was released online on 2 May 2012 and was received positively by the audiences. The film was released on 15 June in India. The film was initially released in major Gujarat cities, Vadodara, Ahmedabad, Surat as well as some small cities, and also in Mumbai. In the first week, the film was released with 34 prints and increased to 60 prints in the second week due to increasing demand. After the initial success in Gujarat, the film was planned to be released in USA, UK, Australia, New Zealand and some middle-eastern countries as well, subsequently it was released in USA (at New Jersey and Chicago) on 31 August 2012.

=== Marketing ===
The premier was held at Cinépolis, Ahmedabad and was attended by the whole cast and crew. As part of promoting the movie, special screenings were held along with the crew at Rajkot, Vadodara, Surat and Ahmedabad. The makers have widely used social media for the promotion of the movie. They released a Facebook game as well.

=== Critical reception ===
Initial reviews of the movie were positive. Long live cinema called the movie a "glimmer of hope" for Gujarati cinema. Leading Gujarati newspapers reviewed the film positively. Divya Bhaskar rated the movie 3.5 out of 5 stars and called it a "truly urban film" and "revolutionary". Gujarat Samachar also reviewed it positively. DNA praised the movie saying "KRJ in all is a funny roller coaster ride with its own share of romance, drama, apprehension, desperation, exhilaration and insanity". Leading Gujarati blog Desh Gujarat also praised the movie calling it "paisa vasool". Leading Gujarat Samachar columnist, Jay Vasavada, called it the best Gujarati film since Bhavni Bhavai.

=== Boxoffice ===
The film ran more than for six weeks in Bharuch, and ten weeks in Ahmedabad, Vadodara and a few other cities. The film eventually completed sixteen weeks.

== Awards ==
=== 2012 BIG Gujarati Entertainment Awards ===
The film was nominated for all eight categories and won seven of them.

Film

- Best actor (male) – Divyang Thakkar
- Best actor (female) – Veronica Gautam
- Best director – Abhishek Jain
- Best film

Music

- Best male playback singer – Roop Kumar Rathod (Kevi rite jaish)
- Best female playback singer – Aishwarya Majumdar (Bheeni bheeni)
- Best music album
- Best entertaining song – Pankhida Vishvesh Parmar

=== 12th Annual Transmedia Gujarati Screen & Stage awards ===
The film was nominated for 15 categories and won 10 awards.

Film

- Best film
- Best director
- Best story – Abhishek Jain, Anish Shah
- Best debutant (female) – Veronica Gautam
- Best supporting actor (male) – Anang Desai
- Best cinematography – Pushkar Singh

Music

- Best music – Mehul Surti
- Best male playback singer – Parthiv Gohil
- Best female playback singer – Aishwarya Majumdar
- Best lyrics – Raeesh Maniar
