= List of Gujarati films of 2025 =

List of Gujarati language films released in 2025

This is a list of Gujarati language films released in 2025. According to the Ormax Media report, in January—October 2025, the Gujarati films collectively surpassed ₹100 crore (US$10 million) gross box office for the first time. The report also highlighted the diversity of genres of successful films. According to the Ormax Box Office report of 2025, Gujarati cinema registered growth of 189% to ₹242 crore (US$25 million) from ₹89 crore (US$9.2 million) in the previous year. The devotional drama film Laalo – Krishna Sada Sahaayate was declared the sleeper hit and became the highest-grossing Gujarati film of all-time as well as the first Gujarati film to gross over ₹100 crore (US$10 million) worldwide, eventually grossing ₹120 crore (US$12 million).

== Box-office collection ==
The following is the list of the highest-grossing Gujarati cinema films released in 2025.

Background shading indicates that a film is currently showing in theatres.

Highest grossing Gujarati cinema films of 2025
Rank	Film	Director	Studio(s)	Worldwide Gross	Source
1	Laalo – Krishna Sada Sahaayate	Ankit Sakhiya	Manifest Films, Jay Vyas Productions	est. ₹120 crore (US$12 million)	
2	Chaniya Toli	Jay Bodas, Parth Trivedi	Anand Pandit Motion Pictures, Jannock Films	est. ₹23 crore (US$2.4 million)	
3	Umbarro	Abhishek Shah	Everest Entertainment	est. ₹17 crore (US$1.8 million)	
4	Vash Level 2	Krishnadev Yagnik	KS Entertainment Studios	est. ₹16 crore (US$1.7 million)	
5	Bachu Ni Benpani	Vipul Mehta	Coconut Motion Pictures	est. ₹15 crore (US$1.6 million)	
6	All The Best Pandya	Rahul Bhole, Vinit Kanojia	Jeegar Chauhan Productions	est. ₹14 crore (US$1.5 million)	
7	Jai Mata Ji - Let's Rock	Manish Saini	Amdavad Films	est. ₹8 crore (US$830,000)	
8	Bhram	Pallav Parikh	City Shore Ahmedabad	est. ₹6 crore (US$620,000)	

== January–March ==
Opening	Name	Genre	Director	Cast	Ref.
3 January	Victor 303	Action	Swapnil Mehta	Jagjeetsinh Vadher, Rudraksh Nisiddh Panchal, Anjali Barot, Alisha Prajapati, Chetan Dhanani, Abhinay Banker	
3 January	Kaashi Raaghav	Action Drama	Dhruv Goswami	Deeksha Joshi, Jayesh More, Shruhad Goswami, Pihu Gadhvi	
10 January	Mom Tane Nai Samjay	Family Drama	Dharmessh Mehta	Rashami Desai, Amar Upadhyay, Vriti Vaghani, Namit Shah, Hemang Dave, Tejal Vyas,	
17 January	Taaro Thayo	Family Drama	Dharmesh Patel	Hiten Kumar, Kaajal Oza Vaidya, Hitu Kanodia, Vyoma Nandi, Sunny Pancholi, Sonu Chandrapal, Reeva Rachh, Namann Gor, Vistaasp Gotla, Firoz Irani, Hitesh Raval, Jignesh Modi, Jahanvi Patel	
17 January	Malik Ni Varta	Drama	K. R. Devmani	Anang Desai, Rajiv Mehta, Monal Gajjar, Hitu Kanodia, Chetan Daiya, Sunil Vishrani, Dhvanit Thaker, Malhar Thakar	
17 January	Chhutachheda	Drama	Akhil Kotak	Hitu Kanodia, Arvind Vegda, Akhil Kotak, Nirali Joshi	
17 January	Jigar Ni Jeet	Family drama	Vishnu Thakor	Jigar Thakor, Jimmy Pandya, Jitu Pandya, Chetan Daiya, Pooja Soni, Prakash Mandora	
24 January	Umbarro	Comedy drama	Abhishek Shah	Vandana Pathak, Kaajal Oza Vaidya, Sucheeta Trivedi, Deeksha Joshi, Tarjanee Bhadla, Tejal Panchasara, Vineeta Joshee, Aarjav Trivedi, Sanjay Galsar	
31 January	Faati Ne?	Horror comedy	Faisal Hashmi	Hitu Kanodia, Smit Pandya, Aakash Zala, Hemin Trivedi, Rudraksh Nisiddh panchal	
7 February	Vishwastha	Romance drama	Nikunj Modi	Nikunj Modi, Sonam Lamba, Prashant Barot, Vaishaki Shah, Kalpana Gagdekar	
14 February	Ilu Ilu	Romance, Comedy, Drama	Ravi Sachdev, Parth Shukla	Bhavik Bhojak, Khushbu Trivedi, Pooja Bhat, Nisarg Trivedi, Sonali Lele Desai, Hemang Dave, Firoz Irani, Chetan Daiya, Maulik Chauhan	
21 February	Bholaa: The Power of Man	Action drama	Bhavesh Gorasiya	Rakesh Barot, Riya Jayswal, Jitu Pandya, Kavan Shah	
21 February	Parvat	Drama	Asif Silavat	Hitu Kanodia, Sapna Vyas, Mona Thiba, Akshatt Irani, Rudraksh Nisiddh Panchal	
7 March	Jethalal Na Bhavada	Comedy	Nilesh Mehta	Vidhi Shah, Jignesh Modi	
14 March	All the Best Pandya	Courtroom Drama	Rahul Bhole, Vinit Kanojia	Malhar Thakar, Darshan Jariwala, Vandana Pathak, Yukti Randeria	
14 March	Nehdo	Family action drama	Hitesh Beldar	Jignesh Barot, Prenal Oberai, Jitu Pandya	
21 March	Jija Sala Jija	Comedy drama	Vipul Sharma	Tushar Sadhu, Ragi Jani, Kushal Mistry, Jay Pandya, Dipen Raval, Krina Pathak, Khushbu Trivedi	

== April–June ==
Opening	Name	Genre	Director	Cast	Ref.
18 April	Mithada Maheman	Drama	Chinmay Parmar	Yash Soni, Aarohi Patel, Mitra Gadhavi, Mihir Nishith Rajda	
25 April	Auntypreneur	Drama	Pratik Rajen Kothari	Supriya Pathak, Parikshit Tamaliya, Brinda Trivedi, Yukti Randeria, Vaibhavi Bhatt, Kaushambi Bhatt, Heena Jaikishan, Ojas Rawal, Deepak Antani	
1 May	Shastra	Action, Thriller, Drama	Kartavya Shah	Chetan Dhanani, Puja Joshi, Deep Vaidya, Hemin Trivedi	
9 May	Jai Mata Ji - Let's Rock	Comedy, Family Drama	Manish Saini	Neela Mulherkar, Aaryan Prajapati, Malhar Thakar, Vyoma Nandi, Vandana Pathak, Tiku Talsania, Shekhar Shukla	
16 May	Surprise	Suspense thriller	Sachin Brahmbhatt	Vatsal Sheth, Helly Shah, Jahnvi Chauhan	
23 May	Bhram	Suspense thriller	Pallav Parikh	Mitra Gadhavi, Sonaalee Lele Desai, Abhinay Banker, Nishma Soni	
23 May	Pappa No Insurance	Comedy	Amrut Soni	Parikshit Tamaliya, Tiku Talsania, Anchal Shah, Darshan Soni, Maulika Patel, Rudraksh Nisiddh panchal	
30 May	Shubhchintak	Thriller	Nisarg Vaidya	Swapnil Joshi, Manasi Parekh, Viraf Patel, Deep Vaidya, Mehul Buch, Esha Kansara, Tusharika Rajyaguru	
30 May	Kathiyawadi Tales	Comedy thriller	Abhishek Pandya	Akash Trivedi, Deesha Manwani, Michelle Trivedi, Darpan Soni	
30 May	Bela	Action drama	Tansukh Gohil	Chetan Daiya, Prenal Oberoy, Prashant Barot, Jignesh Modi	
13 June	Jalso - A Family Invitation	Family Drama	Rajiv S. Ruia	Hiten Tejwani, Puja Joshi, Aruna Irani, Bhavin Bhanushali, Hemang Dave, Dharmesh Vyas	
27 June	Goti Lo	Family Drama	Deepak Antani	Manoj Joshi, Mehul Buch, Manav Rao, Bhavya Sirohi, Makrand Annapurna, Dipen Raval, Ravi Omprakash Rao, Jahanvi Patel	
27 June	Jalebi Rocks	Drama	Cchinmay P Purohit	Vandana Pathak, Manav Gohil, Gaurav Paswala, Manasi Rachh	

== July–September ==
Opening	Name	Genre	Director	Cast	Ref.
4 July	Deda	Drama	Hema Shukla	Gaurav Paswala, Helly Shah, Hiten Tejwani, Sonali Lele Desai, Chetan Daiya	
4 July	Anamika	Romance drama	Bhushan Bhatt	Jaini Shah, Ashish Rajput, Charmy Kelaiya, Rishi Jani	
11 July	Vahali	Family Drama	Eventus India Entertainment	Bhavin Bhanushali, Mazel Vyas, Sachin Parikh, Krunal Pandit, Bhoomi Shukla, Vishal Solanki, Gayatri Rawal	
18 July	Chaatar	Drama	Vinod Parmar	Hiren Zinzuwadia, Maulik Nayak, Kaushambi Bhatt, Riddhi P Yadav, Mukesh Rao, Kabir Daiya	
18 July	Sanghavi and Sons	Family Drama	Chandresh K Bhatt	Manoj Joshi, Hiten Tejwani, Komal Thacker, Gaurav Paswala, Dharmesh Vyas	
18 July	Shree	Drama	Utsav Pravin	Chetan Daiya, Bhavana Patel, Prashant Barot, Anand Devmani, Utsav Pravin	
1 August	Maharani	Family Drama	Viral Shah	Manasi Parekh, Shraddha Dangar, Ojas Rawal, Sanjay Goradia	
1 August	Vishwaguru	Drama, Mystery	Shailesh Patel, Atul Sonar	Gaurav Paswala, Krishna Bharadwaj, Mukesh Khanna, Rajeev Mehta, Sonu Chandrapal, Shraddha Dangar, Dharmesh Vyas	
8 August	Bhola No Bhagwan	Drama	Hitesh Beldar	Vikram Thakor, Prerna Oberai, Bhumi Gour	
8 August	Call 104	Social Drama	Bhavesh Gorasiya	Dharmesh Vyas, Samarth Sharma, Roorak Dave, Piyush Khandelwal, Bharat Thakkar, Jaimini Trivedi	
8 August	Varta	Drama comedy	Jasmeet Kumar	Anand Devmani, Priyal Bhatt, Akanksha Bhatnagar, Naisarg Mistry	
27 August	Bachu Ni Benpani	Family Drama	Vipul Mehta	Siddharth Randeria, Ratna Pathak Shah, Devarshi Shah, Yukti Randeria	
27 August	Vash: Level 2	Thriller	Krishnadev Yagnik	Hitu Kanodia, Janki Bodiwala, Monal Gajjar, Hiten Kumar	
5 September	Naankhatai	Drama anthology	Preet Gohil	Hiten Kumar, Mitra Gadhvi, Mayur Chauhan, Esha Kansara, Deeksha Joshi, Tarjani, Alpana Buch, Kalpana Gagdekar, Deep Vaidya, Archan Trivedi, Bharat Thakkar, Chetan Daiya, Hemin Trivedi, Satish Bhatt, Purvaai Patel	
5 September	Ajab Ghar Ni Ghazab Ni Kahani	Drama	Narendra Parmar	Mahendra Panchal, Vidhi Shah, Prakash Mandora, Mitresh Verma	
12 September	Dhinga Masti Story of Brave Children	Drama	Jayesh Trivedi	Vidhi Shah, Arvind Vegda, Tamanna Saraf	
12 September	Fari Ek Vaar	Family Drama	Aakhil Kotak	Supriya Pathak, Tiku Talsania, Avani Modi, Utsav Naik, Netri Trivedi	
19 September	Bharat Ni Dikri	Drama	Keshav Rathod	Prenal Oberai, Jignesh Modi, Krishna Zala, Vidhi Shah	
19 September	Common Man	Drama	Pranav Patel	Chetan Daiya, Ashish Rajput, Vishal Shah, Jaini Shah, Anjali Acharya, Smit Joshi	
19 September	Shwaas	Drama	Vasant Narkar	Raj Vitthalpura, Nisarg Trivedi, Chetan Daiya, Purvi Bhatt, Ruby Thakkar, Jaswant Gadhvi, Mayur Amin	

== October–December ==
Opening	Name	Genre	Director	Cast	Ref.
10 October	Laalo – Krishna Sada Sahaayate	Devotional drama	Ankit Sakhiya	Reeva Rachh, Shruhad Goswami, Karan Joshi, Mishty Kadecha	
17 October	Vikram No 1	Action drama	Jitu Pandya	Vikram Thakor, Sweta Sen, Usha Bhatiya,	
21 October	Chaniya Toli	Comedy drama	Jay Bodas, Parth Trivedi	Yash Soni, Netri Trivedi, Heena Varde, Chetan Daiya, Maulik Nayak, Janki Bodiwala	
31 October	Misri	Romance comedy	Kushal Naik	Raunaq Kamdar, Manasi Parekh, Tiku Talsania, Hitu Kanodia, Kaushambi Bhatt, Princy Prajapati, Prem Gadhavi	
7 November	Pravas	Family drama	Vipul Sharma	Vishal Thakkar, Jay Pandya, Komal Panchal, Nishma Soni	
7 November	Charkat	Comedy drama	AShish Kumar	Sanjay Galsar, Narendra Vyas, Bharat Thakkar, Jagpal Bharad, Shivani Bhatt, Mir Hanif	
14 November	Dusshera	Mythological thriller	Chinmay Naik	Kartik J, Jagdish Italiya, Sundaram Prasad, Pauravi Joshi, Jitendra Sumra,	
14 November	Kundaalu	Social drama	Rohit Prajapati	Sonali Lele Desai, Swayam Gadhavi, Vaibhav Biniwale, Happy Bhavsar Nayak	
21 November	Full Stop	Action drama	Pritesh Patel, Jakee Patel	Kajal Vashist, Saurabh Barot	
28 November	Aavaa De	Romantic comedy	Nihar Thakkar	Parikshit Tamaliya, Kumpal Patel, Hemant Kher, Sonali Lele Desai	
12 December	Ajab Tarzan Ni Gajab Kahani	Drama	Suresh Joshi	Ankit Raj Ravindran, Vidhi Shah, Chetan Daiya, Jaydeep Shah, Kalpesh Patel	
12 December	Jeev	Drama	Jigar Kapdi	Dharmendra Gohil, Shraddha Dangar	
19 December	Collector Viraj	Drama	Bhagvan Vaghela	Jagdish Italiya, Sudharshan Prasad, Pauravi Joshi	
19 December	Napass	Drama	Alok Thaker, Nivedita Shah	Alok Thaker, Laxmi	
19 December	Raja Saheb	Fantasy drama	Utpal Modi	Harsh Kavithiya, Dimple Upadhyay, Jay Rami, Jignesh Modi, Naitik Desai, Rudraksh Nisiddh panchal	
19 December	Two Cup Tea	Drama	Himanshu Patel	Jignesh Modi, Vidhi Shah, Naisarg Mistry	
25 December	Vande Bharat Via USA	Comedy drama	Jaymin Patel	Malhar Thakar, Pooja Jhaveri, Kelly Pearson	

== See also ==
- Gujarati cinema
- List of Gujarati films
- List of Gujarati films of 2024
- List of Gujarati films of 2026
- List of highest-grossing Gujarati films
- 100 Crore Club
