= List of Gujarati films of 2020 =

This is a list of Gujarati language films that were released in 2020. On 15 March 2020, all theaters in Gujarat were ordered to be closed following COVID-19 pandemic. They were reopened in October 2020. The Gujarati films collectively grossed ₹15 crore (US$1.6 million) in 2020–21, according to Ormax Box Office Report.

== Box-office collection ==
Rank	Film	Director	Studio(s)	Gross	Source
1	Golkeri	Viral Shah	Soul Sutra	est. ₹9 crore (US$940,000)	

== January–March ==
Opening	Name	Director	Cast	Source
3 January	Chakkarbazz	Ashok Rumade	Vijay Kabra, Rashmi Shah, Muskan Khatra	
3 January	G	Mahendra Patel	Anveshi Jain, Abhimanyu Singh, Chirag Jani, Kumpal Patel, Aakash Zala	
17 January	Babubhai Sentimental	Milan Sharma	Shivani Joshi, Nakshraaj, Deval Nanavati, Shekhar Shukla, Nisarg Trivedi	
17 January	Kem Chho?	Vipul Sharma	Tushar Sadhu, Kinjal Rajpriya	
24 January	Mission Gujarat	Suresh Joshi	Chandan Rathod, Arti Bhavasar, Nirav Kalal, Paresh Bhatt	
31 January	Luv Ni Love Storys	Durgesh Tanna	Pratik Gandhi, Shraddha Dangar, Vyoma Nandi, Deeksha Joshi, Hardik Sanghani, Mehul Buch, Alpana Buch, Bhavini Jani	
14 February	Affraa Taffri	Viral Rao	Mitra Gadhvi, Chetan Daiya, Shekhar Shukla, Smit Pandya, Prashant Barot, Ragi Jani, Khushi Shah, Aakash Zala	
14 February	Safalta 0 km	Akshay Yagnik	Dharmesh Yelande, Dharmesh Vyas, Kurush Deboo, Manisha Thakkar	
21 February	Paatra	Bhavin Trivedi	Dinesh Lamba, Prinal Oberai, Prashant Barot, Kurush Deboo	
28 February	Golkeri	Viral Shah	Malhar Thakar, Manasi Parekh, Sachin Khedekar, Vandana Pathak	

On 15 March 2020, all theatres in Gujarat were ordered to be closed following COVID-19 pandemic.

== November–December ==
Opening	Name	Director	Cast	Source
13 November	Yuva Sarkar	Rakshit Vasavada	Jitendra Thakkar, Mehul Buch, Harshal Mankad, Astha Mehta	
13 November	Have Kyare Malishu	Harshad Kandoliya	Jignesh Barot, Prinal Oberoi, Rajdip Barot	
20 November	Johnny Engineer	Nivedita Das Sahu, Alok Thaker	Alok Thaker, Nivedita Das Sahu, Dhruvi Soni, Bobby Makwana	
27 November	London Calling	Urvish Parikh	Bhavwini Gandhi, Poojan Joshi, Hitesh Sampat	
27 November	Beti	Himmat Jikadara	Yatin Karyekar, Dharmesh Vyas, Mehul Solanki, Vimmy Bhatt, Sunil Vishrani	

== See also ==
- Gujarati cinema
- List of Gujarati films
- List of highest-grossing Gujarati films
