= Taaro Thayo =

2025 film directed by Dharmesh Patel

- Official Poster
- Directed by: Dharmesh Patel
- Written by: Kaajal Oza Vaidya
- Produced by: Vijay Chauhan; Nidhi Chauhan; Sanjay Chauhan; Pramod Parmar (Co Producer); Dharmesh Patel (Co Producer); Dharmendrasinh Raj (Co Producer)
- Starring: Hiten Kumar; Kaajal Oza Vaidya; Hitu Kanodia; Vyoma Nandi; Sunny Pancholi
- Cinematography: Nagraj Diwakar
- Edited by: Dharmesh Patel; Shadab Khan
- Music by: Ripul Sharma; Abhijit Vaghani
- Production company: Leela Mohan Productions
- Distributed by: Panorama Studios
- Release date: 17 January 2025
- Country: India
- Language: Gujarati

Taaro Thayo is a 2025 Gujarati family drama, directed by Dharmesh Patel. It stars Hiten Kumar Kaajal Oza Vaidya, Hitu Kanodia, Vyoma Nandi, Sunny Pancholi and others. It is produced by Vijay Chauhan, Nidhi Chauhan & Sanjay Chauhan, along with co produced by Pramod Parmar, Dharmesh Patel and Dharmendrasinh Raj under the banner of Leela Mohan Production.

== Plot ==
Taaro Thayo is a heartwarming celebration of love's timeless magic, featuring Kedar and Mitali, portrayed by Hiten Kumaar and Kaajal Oza Vaidya, alongside Aarav and Antara, played by Sunny Pancholi and Vyoma Nandi. Together, they rediscover each other through life's journey, proving that true love means falling for the same heart over and over again.

== Cast ==
- Hiten Kumar as Kedar
- Kaajal Oza Vaidya as Mitali
- Hitu Kanodia as Nisarg
- Vyoma Nandi as Antara
- Sunny Pancholi as Aarav
- Naman Gor as Rishabh
- Reeva Rachh as Priya
- Sonu Chandrapal as Radhika
- Vistaasp Gotla as Jay
- Firoz Irani as Umesh Kumar
- Jignesh Modi as Colonel Orderly
- Hitesh Raval as Colonel
- Jahanvi Patel as Aruna Ben

== Production ==
The film was shot at various locations in Gujarat. The music of the film has been given by Ripul Sharma and Abhijit Vaghani. The music has been released by Panorama Music.

== Soundtrack ==
Taaro Thayo

Soundtrack album
- Released: 2024
- Recorded: 2024
- Genre: Feature film soundtrack
- Length: 17:08
- Language: Gujarati
- Label: Panorama Music

=== Tracklist ===
Track listing
No.	Title	Lyrics	Music	Singer(s)	Length
1.	"Taaro Thayo Title Track"	Maulin Parmar	Ripul Sharma	Ripul Sharma	2:38
2.	"Hanslo Ne Hansli Ni Jodi Nirali"	Milind Gadhavi	Abhijit Vaghani	Abhijit Vaghani, Bhrigu Parashar, Nisha Kapadia, Rinkle Soni, Naval Bariya	3:56
3.	"Saath Choote Naa"	Milind Gadhavi	Ripul Sharma	Osman Mir	3:43
4.	"Satrangi Rango"	Maulin Parmar	Abhijit Vaghani	Soham Naik	2:02
5.	"RumPum RumPum"	Maulin Parmar	Ripul Sharma	Ripul Sharma	2:22
6.	"Ram Ratan Dhan Payo Paayo"	Maulin Parmar	Ripul Sharma	Urvashi Radadiya	2:27
Total length:					17:08

== Marketing and releases ==
The announcement of the release date has been made on 1 December 2024, The official teaser of the film released on 19 December 2024. The title track of the film released on 23 December 2024. Hansala Hansali Song is released on 28 December 2024. The trailer of the film is released on 3 January 2025. The film theatrically released on 17 January 2025.

== Reception ==
Soumitra Das from The Times of India rated 3.5 out of 5, appreciating its exploration of a relatively untouched subject in Gujarati cinema. He commended director Dharmesh Patel for his portrayal of relationships across generations, with a strong second half that elevates the film. He highlighted the emotional depth brought by lead actors Kaajal Oza Vaidya and Hiten Kumar, noting their compelling performances in pivotal scenes. Hitu Kanodia’s impactful cameo and the chemistry between Sunny Pancholi and Vyoma Nandi were also praised. The supporting cast delivered commendable performances, enhancing the narrative. Music by Ripul Sharma and Abhijit Vaghani, especially the title track and Saath Choote Naa, was described as enjoyable. Soumitra Das concluded that the film’s sweet ending leaves the audience with a sense of satisfaction.

== See also ==
- List of Gujarati films of 2025
