= Dharmesh Vyas =

Indian actor (born 1964)

- Born: May 28, 1964 (age 62); Mumbai, India
- Occupation: Actor
- Years active: 1992–present
- Spouse: Surbhi Javeri Vyas (marriage. 2006)

Dharmesh Vyas (born 28 May 1964) is an Indian actor primarily working in the Gujarati film industry. he made his acting debut in the Gujarati film UnchaTimbe Madi Maru Sasaru in 1992 where his co actor was Shalini Kapoor, Ramesh Mehta. His first block buster was Maa Baap ne Bhuloso Nahi, which got released in 1999 where his co actor was Naresh Kanodia, Upendra Trivedi and others. He has spent more than 35 years in entertainment industry which includes films and daily soaps, like Kuch Reet Jagat Ki Aisi Hai, Ladies Special. He consider Homi Wadia as his mentor.

== Life and career ==
Dharmesh Vyas has completed his graduation from MTB Arts college in Surat and further he has done Bachelor of Arts in dramatics in Gold Medal from Maharaja Sayajirao University of Baroda. His early days dreams to be an Army officer but destiny made him an actor. His father was an engineer and his mother is a singer just like his elder sister. Dharmesh Vyas married to his love Surbhi Javeri Vyas in on the Valentine's Day of 2006. by profession she is also an actress. Dharmesh Vyas has done several projects with Dhwani Gautam

== Filmography ==
Year	Title	Director	Language
1992	UnchaTimbe Madi Maru Sasaru	Shridhar Vyas	Gujarati
1999	Maa Baap Ne Bhulsho Nahi	Aatmaram Thakor	Gujarati
2010	Diwangi Ne Had Kar Di	Jiten Purohit	Hindi
2015	Gujjubhai the Great	Ishan Randeria	Gujarati
2016	Romance Complicated	Dhwani Gautam	Gujarati
2016	Tu To Gayo	Dhwani Gautam	Gujarati
2016	Navari Bazar	Rajesh Bhatt & Jitendra Thakkar	Gujarati
2016	Aata Majhi Hatli	Mahendra Devlekar	Marathi
2017	Samaychakra	Amarkumar Jadeja	Gujarati
2018	Turtle	Dinesh Yadav	Hindi
2019	Order Order Out of Order	Dhwani Gautam	Gujarati
2020	Golkeri	Viral Shah	Gujarati
2020	Safalta 0KM	Akshay Yagnik	Gujarati
2021	Beti Kyare Boj Nathi Hoti	Himmat Jikadara	Gujarati
2021	RIP – Ramnik In Problem	Amit Ramesh Rughani	Gujarati
2021	Waah Zindagi	Dinesh Yadav	Hindi
2022	Hoon Tari Heer	Dhwani Gautam	Gujarati
2022	Chabutro	Chanakya Patel	Gujarati
2023	Lakiro	Darshan Ashwin Trivedi	Gujarati
2023	Gulaam Chor	Viral Shah	Gujarati
2023	Hu Chuu Mr. Shankar	Rafik Talukdar	Gujarati
2025	Dhoom Dhaam	Rishab Seth	Hindi
2025	Jalso – A Family Invitation	Rajiv Ruia	Gujarati
2025	Sanghavi and Sons	Chandresh K Bhatt	Gujarati
2025	Vishwaguru	Shailesh Boghani & Atul Sonar	Gujarati
2025	Call 104	Bhavesh Gorasiya	Gujarati
2026	Vaanki Chuki Love Story	Dhwani Gautam	Gujarati
2026	NRI Dulhan	Bharat Mehta	Gujarati
2026	State of Ramadhani: Dharyu Dhani Nu Thay	Bhavesh Gorasiya	Gujarati
2026	Shatir	Rupin shah	Gujarati
