= Paatki =

2026 Indian Gujarati Thriller film

- Official Poster
- Directed by: Abhinay Deshmukh
- Written by: Abhinay Deshmukh
- Produced by: Divyesh Doshi; Aalap Kikaani; Nrupal Patel; Yakin Shah
- Starring: Gaurav Paswala; Shraddha Dangar; Hiten Tejwani; Sucheeta Trivedi
- Cinematography: Abhijeet Patil
- Edited by: Hiren Chitroda
- Music by: K Sumant
- Production companies: AMP Studio; Avirat Pictures; Neev Studioz
- Distributed by: Panorama Studios
- Release date: 30 January 2026
- Running time: 126 minutes
- Country: India
- Language: Gujarati

Paatki is a 2026 Indian Gujarati suspense, crime thriller and drama film written and directed by Abhinay Deshmukh. The film stars Gaurav Paswala, Karan Joshi, Shraddha Dangar, Hiten Tejwani, Sucheeta Trivedi and others. It is produced by Divyesh Doshi, Aalap Kikaani, Nrupal Patel and Yakin Shah under the banner of AMP Studio, in association with Avirat Pictures and Neev Studioz. The film was released in theaters on 30 January 2026.

== Plot ==
A man certain of his guilt faces a world certain of his innocence, and the truth shatters them both.

== Cast ==
- Gaurav Paswala as Maanav Mehta
- Karan Joshi as Chiman
- Shraddha Dangar as Nitya Mehta
- Suchita Trivedi as Hemlata Dave
- Hiten Tejwani as Inspector Arjun Thakker
- Nilesh Parmar as Murli
- Aakash Zala as Hansal Desai
- Ujjval Dave as Doshi
- Makrand Shukla as Dr. Parekh
- Aatman Shah as Shantanu Dave
- Sohil Lia as Sandy
- Rajan Deshmukh as Baba

== Production ==
=== Casting ===
The film stars Karan Joshi and Gaurav Paswala in lead roles. Karan Joshi is known for his work in the Gujarati film Laalo – Krishna Sada Sahaayate, while Gaurav Paswala has previously appeared in Gujarati films such as Sanghavi and Sons and Jalebi Rocks. Shraddha Dangar, a well-known actress in the Gujarati film industry, also features prominently in the film.

Hiten Tejwani appears in a supporting role, marking another collaboration with Gaurav Paswala following their work in Sanghavi and Sons. Sucheeta Trivedi, recognised for her role in the television series Baa Bahoo Aur Baby, is also part of the cast. She has previously acted in Gujarati films including Umbarro and The Great Gujarati Matrimony.

The supporting cast includes Nilesh Parmar, who has appeared in Gujarati films such as Ram Bharosey, Samandar (film), and Aum Mangalam Singlem, and Aakash Zala, known for his roles in Faati Ne?, Kehvatlal Parivar, Hellaro, and Medal (film).

== Marketing and release ==
The film was officially announced on 1 December 2025, along with its release date, through social media platforms and YouTube. The teaser was released on 2 January 2026, followed by the trailer on 16 January 2026. Paatki was theatrically released across India on 30 January 2026. The film will also be released internationally in regions including Dubai, the United States, the United Kingdom, Canada, East Africa, New Zealand, Australia, and other Gulf countries through Panorama Studios’ worldwide distribution.

== Reception ==
Abdul Kadir of Tenvow wrote: "In the landscape of Gujarati cinema, Paatki stands out as a thoughtful thriller that questions reality without excessive drama. It avoids typical song-and-dance routines, focusing instead on character introspection and suspense." Another review stated: "Paatki is not a mass-masala entertainer, and it doesn’t try to be. Instead, it offers a thought-provoking cinematic experience that reflects the evolving face of Gujarati cinema."

== See also ==
- List of Gujarati films of 2026
- List of Gujarati films
