= Gulaam Chor =

2023 film directed by Viral Shah

- Directed by: Viral Shah
- Written by: Viral Shah; Hardik Sangani
- Produced by: Jyoti Deshpande; Masumeh Makhija; Viral Shah
- Starring: Malhar Thakar; Vandana Pathak; Kamlesh Oza; Vinita Mahesh; Vyoma Nandi; Hardik Sangani
- Cinematography: Vikas Joshi
- Music by: Ambresh Shorff
- Production companies: Jio Studios; The Creative Tribe
- Distributed by: JioCinema
- Release date: 11 June 2023
- Running time: 118 minutes
- Country: India
- Language: Gujarati

Gulaam Chor is a 2023 Gujarati mystery thriller comedy film directed by Viral Shah, which revolves around a heist. Viral Shah and actor Hardik Sangani is debuting as writer in the film. It stars Malhar Thakar. Vandana Pathak, Kamlesh Oza, Vinita Mahesh and others. The film is produced by Jyoti Deshpande, Masumeh Makhija and Viral Shah.

== Plot ==
The film centers around a high-stakes gambling session during a house party, where twelve individuals come together with hopes of winning a massive sum of Rs 12 crore. However, when the lights suddenly go out at midnight, the money vanishes, leaving everyone bewildered and suspicious of each other.

== Cast ==
- Malhar Thakar as Sanjay Shukla
- Vandana Pathak as Seema Kapadia
- Dharmesh Vyas as DK
- Kamlesh Oza as Ashwin Majethia
- Vinita Mahesh as Aarti Majethia
- Hardik Sangani as Rajkumar Ha Ha Ha
- Vyoma Nandi as Saloni Sisodiya
- Ojas Rawal as Harshad Parekh
- Bhavini Jani as Baa
- Ragi Jani as Lala
- Dilip Rawal as Hitesh Dholakia
- Bhumika Barot as Lata Dholakia
- Pralay Rawal as Chotu Kaka

== Production ==
It is produced under the banner of JioCinema and The Creative Tribe. The music of the film has given by Ambresh Shorff. The entire movie has been shoot at one location in Bhavnagar from 1 July 2021 to 17 July 2021.

== Soundtrack ==
Gulaam Chor

Studio album by Ambresh Shroff
- Released: 10 June 2023
- Genre: Feature film soundtrack

=== Tracklist ===
All lyrics are written by Ambresh Shroff; all music is composed by Ambresh Shorff.

No.	Title	Lyrics	Music	Singer(s)	Length
1.	"Gulaam Chor"	Ambresh Shorff	Ambresh Shroff	Jigardan Gadhavi, Shuchita Vyas & Ambresh Shroff	2:51

== Marketing and release ==
The movie was directly released on OTT on JioCinema on 11 June 2023. The music of the film acquired by Times Music.

== See also ==
- List of Gujarati films of 2023
