= Jhamkudi =

2024 film directed by Umang Vyas

- Directed by: Umang Vyas
- Written by: Heath Bhatt
- Produced by: Parthiv Gohil; Manasi Parekh
- Starring: Manasi Parekh; Viraj Ghelani; Sanjay Goradia; Ojas Rawal
- Cinematography: Titu Kumar Jena
- Production companies: Soul Sutra; RD Brothers
- Distributed by: Rupam Entertainment Pvt Ltd
- Release date: 31 May 2024
- Running time: 153 minutes
- Country: India
- Language: Gujarati
- Box office: est.₹25 crore

Jhmkudi is a 2024 Gujarati horror comedy drama, directed by Umang Vyas and written by Heath Bhatt. It stars Manasi Parekh Viraj Ghelani, Sanjay Goradia, Ojas Rawal, Chetan Daiya and others. The film is produced by Parthiv Gohil, Manasi Parekh and co produced by Dhaval Thakkar. The film will be distributed by Rupam Entertainment. The film received mix reviews but was commercially hit.

== Plot ==
When the whole Gujarat is celebrating Navratri, the village of Raniwada dwells in the darkness since ages as celebrating garba is forbidden due to the curse of an evil witch named Jhamkudi. But the rules are broken and the haunting starts again. Bablo, a real estate agent with tricks up his sleeve is called back from the city and Kumud, an NRI heir of the royal family returns to face the wrath of the witch. Will Bablo be able to solve the mystery and save Raniwada from the curse of Jhamkudi?

== Cast ==
- Manasi Parekh as Kumud/Jhamkudi
- Viraj Ghelani as Bablo
- Sanjay Goradia as Babulal Mistry
- Ojas Rawal as Ghelchandra
- Chetan Daiya as Inspector Omkaar/Okiyo
- Krunal Pandit as Mansukh Dholakia Real Estate agent
- Jayesh More as Kalicharan PHD
- Nisarg Trivedi as Vishvajeet
- Bhavini Jani as Veena Waghela
- Rakesh Modi as Piyush Waghela
- Sanjay Galsar as 6Ma5, Babla's Friend
- Bhaumik Ahir as Ae, Babla's Friend
- Hetal Modi as Sushila
- Hemang Barot as Bhanwar Singh
- Parth Nair as Ramse
- Rajal Pujara as Kinjal
- Helly Thakkar as Parul
- Pankaj Soni as Sarpanch
- Nainisha Jhunjhunwadia as Sapana
- Pooja Patel as Shrushti
- Salonie Khanna as Real Kumud

== Production ==
The film was shot at various locations in Gujarat including a palace in Vaso(Kheda), Gondal. The music of the film has been acquired by Tips Industries.

It was debut Gujarati film of Viraj Ghelani.

== Soundtrack ==
Jhamkudi

Studio album by Kruz - Aghori Music, Shadaab Hashmi, & Bandish Project
- Released: 16 May 2024
- Genre: Feature film soundtrack
- Label: Tips Industries

=== Tracklist ===
All lyrics are written by Kruz - Aghori Muzik, K.Deep - Aghori Muzik, Priya Saraiya, Niren Bhatt; all music is composed by Kruz - Aghori Music, Shadaab Hashmi, & Bandish Project.

No.	Title	Lyrics	Music	Singer(s)	Length
1.	"Jhamkudi (Title Song)"	Kruz - Aghori Muzik, K.Deep - Aghori Muzik	Kruz - Aghori Muzik	Manasi Parekh & Kruz - Aghori Muzik, K.Deep - Aghori Muzik	2:30
2.	"Vaat Che"	Priya Saraiya	Shadaab Hashmi	Siddharth Amit Bhavsar	2:52
3.	"Jogni"	Niren Bhatt	Bandish Projekt	Hariom Gadhavi	3:26
Total length:					08:08

== Marketing and release ==
A teaser was released on 26 April 2024. The trailer was released on 10 May 2024. It was released on 31 May 2024.

=== Home video ===
Later, it was released on Video on demand on ShemarooMe on 17 October 2024.

== Reception ==
The film netted ₹3.35 crore (US$350,000) in the first four days. It grossed over ₹8.5 crore (US$890,000) in the first 10 days. It grossed ₹9.75 crore (US$1.0 million) in two weeks, according to Film Information. It grossed est.₹25 crore.

Mid-Day Gujarati reviewed it 4 out of 5. It praised direction, performances and music but criticised plot points without logic and slow first half. Tarun Banker of Loksatta Jansatta criticised the film for story, dialogues and script; casting as well as "theatre-like" cinematography.

== See also ==
- List of Gujarati films of 2024
- List of highest-grossing Gujarati films
