= List of Sumit Sambhal Lega episodes =

The following is an episode list for the sitcom Sumit Sambhal Lega. The series ran from 31 August 2015, to 4 January 2016, airing 108 episodes.

== List of Episodes ==
No.	Title	Original release date
1	"Meet Sumit Walia !"	31 August 2015
Maya is upset with Sumit's family's invasive behavior, especially the awful Mother. The Walias live across the street and have the habit of bursting in unannounced. When Maya wants to be alone on her birthday, and Sumit's family wants to have a party, he tries to come up with a plan to make everyone happy, but it ends up in a mess.
3	"I Love You"	2 September 2015
During dinner with their friends, Rahul and Simran, they witness public display of affection. Later Maya is dying to know why Sumit can't do the same for her as he doesn't even say, "I Love You" anymore. Sumit involves his parents and gets everyone upset.
4	"Look, But Don't Touch"	3 September 2015
Sumit is attracted to a waitress at Jeto's and Maya finds out about the so-called "attraction" after Sumit accidentally leaves his wallet at the restaurant. She then drags the whole family to Jeto's to meet the waitress.
5	"Working Late Again"	4 September 2015
Maya becomes upset with Sumit because he is always late coming home from work. When she catches him having pizza and playing at work, he reluctantly decides to work from home. At home, he starts to mess the house and Rajneesh and Jasbir come over a lot more, Maya asks him to go back to the office.
6	"Dolly-Jasbir's Kachori Tiff"	5 September 2015
Jasbir gets into an argument with Dolly, criticising her about the dahi kachoris she has made. Sumit fails to convince Dolly to let go. So he goes to Jasbir. Maya tries to convince Dolly too.
7	"Neighbors"	7 September 2015
Jasbir starts disturbing the entire neighborhood with the drill machine, car alarm, etc. The neighbors come to Sumit and Maya's house to discuss the issues and Dolly walks into it. They get very upset and Sumit feels guilty. Jasbir and Dolly have a small party for the neighbors and patch things up. Sumit still feels guilty and goes to the temple. When the priest learns that Sumit is Jasbir's son, he absolves him immediately.
8	"Haldighati Ka Senapati"	8 September 2015
When Sumit's cricket team G.I. Giants performs badly in the league, the other players elect Rajneesh as their captain. When Rajneesh changes his batting position from no. 2 to no. 9, Sumit is disappointed and jealous. Maya suggests giving up the team and spending time with the family, and he agrees. Rajneesh bosses the team around and they kick him out. Sumit becomes their new captain and misses a day out with Maya and the kids. Eventually, Sumit quits and Rajneesh joins the opposing team and wins the game for them.
9	"Father Knows Least"	9 September 2015
Aliya is having trouble listening and is becoming very stubborn, so Sumit and Maya take a parenting class. Maya finds it difficult to use the active listening technique on Aliya, but Sumit is able. He succeeds when he tries it on Dolly and Jasbir and also on Aliya.
10	"The Family Bed"	10 September 2015
Aliya is having trouble sleeping in her own room, much to Sumit's dismay, as he is sleep deprived because of Aliya's kicks. The next day, Sumit brings Dolly to sleep with Aliya without Maya's knowledge, but Jasbir foils his plan.
11	"The Kabaddi Match"	11 September 2015
Jasbir is all motivated to form a kabaddi team. Sumit gets upset as Jasbir invites Rajneesh but not him to join the team. Sumit pretends to be having a pain in his leg when Jasbir puts him in the rival team. He confronts Jasbir for being partial to his sons.
12	"Santoshi Bhua"	12 September 2015
Ally writes a letter to one of Sumit's distant relatives in Punjab. Soon, this relative shows up at the Walias' front door. She brings warmth and togetherness to the family until a problem arises – she isn't really their relative.
13	"Here Comes Captain Cheetah!"	14 September 2015
When Sumit confronts Jasbir about a bat signed by Sachin Tendulkar, Jasbir admits that it is a fake and that he signed it himself. Sumit is very hurt and decides never to lie to his kids. His resolution is put to test when Aliya asks about Captain Cheetah, a cartoon character. Sumit starts to question his beliefs and talks to Jasbir about it.
14	"A brother In Need Is A Brother Indeed"	15 September 2015
Rajneesh is feeling lonely on the anniversary of the day when his fiance left him. Jasbir and Dolly suggest to Sumit that he take Rajneesh out to get his mind off it. It turns out to be a good night, until Rajneesh finds out why it happened. Later Sumit tells him that he actually loved spending time with him and they make up.
15	"Party At The Walias"	16 September 2015
Sumit apologises to Maya for not paying the dues. Dolly asks Sumit and Maya to attend the kitty party at her house. Sumit loses 10,000 Rs Jasbir while playing ludo with his lodge buddies Nippi and Manjeet. Maya and Dolly try to get the money returned. It turns out that Dolly has been stealing money from Jasbir and saving it behind his back.
16	"Who's Macho"	17 September 2015
When Maya's friend Simran contributes to Rajneesh's Delhi Police Dog Welfare Fund, she and Rajneesh hit it off. When Rajneesh is unsure about going on a date, Maya mentions that he is the most macho Walia she has met. Sumit becomes very insecure about this comment and becomes obsessed with his appearance. Rajneesh begins dating Simran. Meanwhile, Sumit gets a spray-on tan and a new look.
17	"Maya's Sick"	18 September 2015
Maya, Aliya and Avi are sick, and Sumit has to take the kids to the doctor. He has a meeting with Kapil Dev that he cannot avoid, so he tries to do the interview at the pediatrician's office. There he discovers that he forgot to bring Avi, whom Rajneesh brings. Dolly drops in to interfere in Maya's life again, and gets on her nerves. Jasbir and Rajneesh follow her and make it worse for Maya. But in the end, she gets rid of them. Guest Stars : Kapil Dev as himself
18	"Sumit's Funeral Speech"	19 September 2015
When a family member on Sumit's side dies it becomes his job to give the eulogy at the funeral ceremony. Dolly is shocked to discover her alienated sister, Minti, is coming to the funeral. Dolly and Minti have a huge fight during the funeral about Sumit's wedding and it's up to Sumit to patch them up.
19	"The Fake Diamond Ring"	21 September 2015
Sumit is shocked to learn that the engagement ring he bought for Maya, with Jasbir's help, is fake. He replaces the ring with a new one and throws out the fake ring. But the tables are turned when Maya tells him that she had already changed it when she realized it was cheap, replacing the stone with a Rs.2,50,000 gem from one of her ancestors. Meanwhile, Simran and Rajneesh try to get each other unique gifts for Valentine's Day.
20	"Jasbir Ban Gaye Writer"	22 September 2015
Jasbir begins to consider himself a writer after a storytelling radio show publishes one of his stories. He writes his own column and asks Sumit to give it to his editor. But the family want to get rid of him as he irritates them with his narrations.
21	"Jasbir's Birthday Celebration"	23 September 2015
Sumit forgets to buy Jasbir a birthday present, so he decides to get him an aquarium, which tops Rajneesh's present of a remote controller. Jasbir is thrilled initially with the gift, but soon changes his mind after one of the fish dies. Maya thinks that it's because it reminds him of his own death, but Sumit later realizes that it was because of the cost of the fish and the aquarium.
22	"The Health-Conscious Walias"	24 September 2015
When Dolly's cholesterol is close to the danger zone, she decides to cook a fat free dinner for the whole family. Maya convinces the family to be supportive, but when Sumit orders a real meal from a restaurant, all pounce on it. In the end, Dolly also joins them.
23	"Sumit at Harsha Bhogle's show"	25 September 2015
Sumit is invited to give his views about cricket live on Harsha Bhogle's TV show. It does not go very well. His family is excited and they all watch it together. They all initially appreciate him. When he is called on the show again, the family gives him an honest feedback, which makes Sumit very conscious on TV. Guest Stars : Harsha Bhogle as himself, Jatin Sapru as himself
24	"Dolly Confronts Maya"	26 September 2015
25	"Jasbir-Dolly: Wedding Anniversary"	28 September 2015
26	"Maya's Got A New Maid"	29 September 2015
27	"Maya's Parents VS Sumit's"	30 September 2015
28	"Maya Becomes A Story Writer"	1 October 2015
29	"Sumit Takes Care Of Ghar Kharcha"	2 October 2015
30	"Jasbir Wins An Award"	3 October 2015
31	"Walias Simran Le Jaayenge"	5 October 2015
32	"Maya Refuses To Do Avi's Mundan"	6 October 2015
33	"Sumit's Reunion Party"	7 October 2015
34	"Rajneesh Arrests The Goons"	8 October 2015
35	"Jasbir Tries Bungee Jumping"	9 October 2015
36	"Jasbir, The Rash Driver"	10 October 2015
37	"Pests Inside Dolly's House"	13 October 2015
38	"Maya Writes A Letter To Dolly"	14 October 2015
39	"Rajneesh Leaves The House"	15 October 2015
40	"Sumit Lies To Maya"	15 October 2015
41	"Sumit Apologises To Maya"	16 October 2015
42	"Rajneesh-Simran Break Up"	17 October 2015
43	"The Sumit-Maya Fight!"	19 October 2015
44	"Maya's Teacher Visits The Walias"	20 October 2015
45	"Sumit Proves His Manhood"	21 October 2015
46	"Rajneesh Introduces Preeti"	22 October 2015
47	"Maya Attends The Interview"	23 October 2015
48	"Where there Is A 'Will'…"	24 October 2015
Special	"Superheroes Of The Walia Family"	25 October 2015
49	"Sumit, Dolly Showcase Talent"	26 October 2015
50	"The Brothers Make A Plan"	27 October 2015
51	"Fun Fair At Aliya's School"	28 October 2015
52	"Maya, Rajneesh Go Dancing"	29 October 2015
53	"Maya Ka IQ Sumit Se Zyaada?"	30 October 2015
54	"Sumit Cheats On Maya"	31 October 2015
55	"The Walias Argue Over Food"	2 November 2015
56	"Sumit Learns About Maya's Debt"	3 November 2015
57	"Simran-Rajneesh Reunite"	4 November 2015
58	"The Walias Play Table Tennis"	5 November 2015
59	"Snoring Maya Drives Sumit Away"	6 November 2015
60	"Ek Family Photo Ho Jaaye"	7 November 2015
61	"Dolly and Maya in a Pickle!"	9 November 2015
62	"Dolly Ruins Rajneesh's Chance"	10 November 2015
63	"Maya-Dolly Argue Over Laddoos"	11 November 2015
64	"Maya Ignores Dolly's Taunts"	12 November 2015
65	"Maya Contests Election"	13 November 2015
66	"Rajneesh is Hospitalised"	14 November 2015
67	"Sumit-Maya Wed Again!"	16 November 2015
68	"Dolly Blackmails Sumit"	17 November 2015
69	"Sumit Spies on Maya"	18 November 2015
70	"It's Rajneesh's birthday!"	19 November 2015
71	"Sumit Makes Fun of Maya, Again!"	20 November 2015
72	"When Sumit First Met Maya"	21 November 2015
73	"Simran Meets Rima"	23 November 2015
74	"Maya, Sumit's Love Anniversary"	24 November 2015
75	"Maya, Sumit Watch Cricket"	25 November 2015
76	"Maya Praises Dolly"	26 November 2015
77	"Rajneesh Asks Dolly to Stay Away"	27 November 2015
78	"Dolly-Maya Mein Tension Hai"	28 November 2015
79	"Rajneesh Squeals On Jasbir, Sumit"	30 November 2015
80	"Maya Makes Fun of Sumit"	1 December 2015
81	"Rajneesh-Simran Have A Tiff"	2 December 2015
82	"Maya Sprains Sumit's Hand"	3 December 2015
83	"Maya, Sumit Go Into Flashback"	4 December 2015
84	"Sumit-Maya Ki Shaadi"	5 December 2015
85	"The Case of a Suitcase"	7 December 2015
86	"Jasbir Wins the Bet"	8 December 2015
87	"Liar, Liar, Rajneesh, Liar"	9 December 2015
88	"An Essay on the Walia Family"	10 December 2015
89	"Sumit's Candid Confession"	11 December 2015
90	"Maya Lends Rajneesh Money"	12 December 2015
91	"Kissa Vacuum Cleaner Ka"	14 December 2015
92	"Jai-Avantika To Meet A Councellor"	15 December 2015
93	"Dolly, Sumit Go To Rishikesh"	16 December 2015
94	"Nagina, Rajneesh's New Girlfriend"	17 December 2015
95	"Dolly's Double Vision"	18 December 2015
96	"Dolly Teaches Sumit To Sing"	19 December 2015
97	"Sumit, Jasbir Contest Election"	21 December 2015
98	"Dolly Exchanges Sumit's Gift"	22 December 2015
99	"Jasbir's Testing Times"	23 December 2015
100	"Walias Celebrate Dolly's Birthday"	24 December 2015
The Walias celebrate Dolly's birthday. Sumit, Rajneesh and Jasbir gift a wall clock to Dolly. Angry after a fight, she refuses to accept the clock. Rajneesh suggests that Sumit to gift Maya the soundtrack of her favourite movie. https://www.youtube.com/watch?v=mU_hNWSEl0o Kabhie Kabhie. Maya scolds Sumit for taking Rajneesh's advice.
101	"Rajneesh Proposes To Simran"	25 December 2015
102	"Sumit-Maya and Yoga"	26 December 2015
103	"Simran's Parents Meet the Walias"	28 December 2015
104	"Rita, Jasbir's Childhood Crush"	29 December 2015
105	"Rajneesh Upsets Simran"	30 December 2015
106	"Rajneesh's Bachelor Party"	1 January 2016
107	"Rajnish and Simran's Wedding Day"	2 January 2016
108	"Rajneesh-Simran Get Married!"	4 January 2016
