= Sumit Sambhal Lega =

Indian sitcom series

- Genre: Sitcom
- Written by: Arshad Sayyed; Sumit Roy; Kautuk Shrivastav; Steve Skrovan
- Directed by: Deven Bhojani; Shashant Shah; Parmeet Sethi
- Starring: See Below
- Opening theme: Sumit Sambhal Lega
- Country of origin: India
- Original language: Hindi
- No. of seasons: 1
- No. of episodes: 108 (list of episodes)

Production
- Producers: Tony Singh; Deeya Singh
- Production location: Mumbai
- Running time: 22 minutes
- Production company: DJ's a Creative Unit

Original release
- Network: StarPlus
- Release: 31 August 2015 – 4 January 2016

Related
- Everybody Loves Raymond; Wszyscy kochają Romana

Sumit Sambhal Lega (transl. Sumit Will Handle All) is an Indian Hindi-language sitcom television series which premiered on 31 August 2015 on StarPlus. The series is an Indian adaptation of the American sitcom Everybody Loves Raymond. Sony Entertainment Television acquired the series' syndication rights in May 2020.

== Plot ==
The 109-episode show revolves around the life of Sumit who lives with his family at D-124, Greater Kailash in Delhi. Whiny and flippant, Sumit does not take many things seriously, making jokes in nearly every situation, no matter how troubling or problematic they are. He often avoids responsibilities around the house and with his kids, leaving them to his wife. Sumit often gets caught for his mischievous activities. In the end, his brother Rajneesh marries his girlfriend despite much trouble and begins to live on the third floor of Sumit's home.

== Cast ==
=== Main cast ===
- Namit Das as Sumit Walia
- Manasi Parekh as Maya Seth Walia
- Saniya Touqeer as Aliya Walia
- Avisha Sharma as Avi Walia
- Bharati Achrekar as Dolly Walia
- Satish Kaushik as Jasbir Walia
- Vikram Kochhar as Rajneesh Walia
- Benaf Dadachandji as Simran Anand Walia

=== Recurring cast ===
- Mohan Kapoor as Jay Seth
- Kavita Kapoor as Avantika Seth
- Muni Jha as Nirmal Anand
- Seema Pandey as Pavitra Anand
- Rakesh Bedi as Satbir Ahluwalia
- Kiran Juneja as Pammi Ahluwalia
- Anita Kanwal as Minti Mausi: Dolly's sister
- Amardeep Jha as Santoshi
- Vindhya Tiwari as Reema
- Sonia Rakkar as Miss Mishri
- Anand Tiwari as Namit
- Navina Bole as Natasha
- Soni Singh as Nagina
- Himani Shivpuri as Rita
- Chirag Vohra as Nirdharit
- Jatin Sapru as Sports Presenter (cricket room)
- Lekh Tandon as Happy Tau

=== Special appearances ===
- Kapil Dev as Interviewee (Episode 17)
- Harsha Bhogle as Host of "Cricket Room" (Episode 23)

== Production ==
The series is an adaptation of Everybody Loves Raymond with a similar essence from the original version along with some deviations and a mix of Indian culture and nuances. For instance, Sumit (Raymond's Indian character) and his family along with his parents live in the same house itself as seen in Indian tradition while in the original version Raymond's parents live across the street from Raymond.

Steve Skrovan, who was a writer of the original series, was part of the team transforming the remake for India and also assisted the team in writing. Arshad Sayed, Chirag Mahabal and Sumit Roy wrote the Hindi scripts.

Speaking about the series Namit Das expressed, "Finally, a show from a man’s point of view — just a fun-loving and light-hearted show. In an industry where women-centric kitchen politics rule, here is a show, that for once would address the married man’s perspective."

The makers wanted to bring the next season of the series but did not get support from the channel as the series did not perform well in terms of TRP.

== Reception ==
Firstpost reviewed, "In Sumit Sambhal Lega, the dialogues are neither particularly funny nor sparkling. Everybody Loves Raymond or Full House or FRIENDS are great examples of how American television writing grabs your attention from the very first scene with its writing. Unfortunately, the emphasis in India appears to be on the packaging instead of the writing. Neither is Everybody Loves Raymond, but you get drawn to the show because of the hilarious repartee and dialogues, the banter between characters, and the very believable reactions. Nothing was over-the-top or seemed illogical."

Daily News and Analysis stated, "The makers have failed to bring the humor, the punch lines and the spunk of the original show. This is a light-hearted and breezy comedy laced with a subtle message that does touch a chord at times. The humour in Everybody Loves Raymond comes from the witty dialogue and the one-liners, which is missing in Sumit." Criticizing the characters, they said, "From the casting to the writing, the series is a complete letdown. Namit Das as Sumit comes across more as a whiny wimp than Ray Romano's Raymond, who was more spunky and entertaining. Mansi Parekh, who steps into Patricia Heaton's shoes is adequate, but not as funny as the latter was. The otherwise talented Bharti Achrekar who plays Dolly Walia is over-the-top (her boy cut and loud make-up add to it). Satish Kaushik as Jasbir Walia delivers a good performance as the obese and always hungry father while Vikram Kocchar as Sumit's elder brother is annoying and thankfully doesn't have much to do."

India Today stated, "Namit would have been doing the job well enough had the makers NOT touted Sumit Sambhal Lega as Everybody Loves Raymond's Indian adaptation. With a heavy heart, though, the sloppy, extremely-difficult-to-love character Kaushik is now playing in Sumit Sambhal Lega does not do justice to the man's stature and experience of 33 years. And his on-screen wife, Bharati Achrekar is not helping the cause either. Thanks to the short boy-cut hair and ostentatious portrayal of her can't-let-go-of affection for Sumit, the battle between her and Manasi Parekh Gohil is organically won by the latter--Maya Walia being the closest to her touted original, Debra Barone."

Hindustan Times said, "It is definitely different than what is being shown on other channels and brings a breath of freshness with light, harmless comedy." Stating about the characters, they reviewed, "Namit Das as Sumit looks like any 'husband-next-door' but needs to brush up his comic timing. Manasi Parekh is Maya, the wife, and plays her part well. Bharati Achrekar plays the mom who doesn't know the word 'Privacy'. The funniest one however is Satish Kaushik who plays the forever-hungry father." However they also expressed to improve the plot and funnier dialogues.

News 18 quoted the series as a refreshing change stating, "Subtle humor on Indian television has been missing for a long time and sitcoms revolving around urban milieu had become a rarity. 'Sumit Sambhal Lega' has emerged as a refreshing change as it is a throwback to light-hearted family comedies."

== Awards and nominations ==
Year	Award	Category	Nominee	Result	Ref
2015	Indian Telly Awards	Best Actress in a Supporting Role	Manasi Parekh	Won	
2015	Indian Telly Awards	Best Actress in a Comic Role	Bharati Achrekar	Nominated	
2015	Indian Telly Awards	Best Actor in a Comic Role	Namit Das	Nominated	
2015	Indian Telly Awards	Best Actor in a Supporting Role	Satish Kaushik	Nominated	

== See also ==
- List of Hindi comedy shows
