= Kissa Court Kachehari Ka =

2026 Hindi-language film by Rajnish Jaiswal

- Directed by: Rajnish Jaiswal
- Produced by: Arun Kumar
- Starring: Rajesh Sharma; Brijendra Kala; Neelu Kohli
- Cinematography: Dharmendra Biswas
- Music by: Pravesh Mallick
- Production company: Lovely Films
- Distributed by: Panorama Studios
- Release date: 13 March 2026
- Running time: 119 Minutes
- Country: India
- Language: Hindi

Kissa Court Kachehari Ka (English: The Courtroom Tale) is a 2026 Indian Hindi-language courtroom drama film directed by Rajnish Jaiswal and produced by Arun Kumar. The film stars Rajesh Sharma, Brijendra Kala and Neelu Kohli. It was released in theatres on 13 March 2026.

== Plot ==
The film follows a courtroom case that brings together individuals from different social backgrounds as they struggle for justice within the Indian legal system. The narrative revolves around a legal battle that unfolds through a series of hearings, revealing the complexities of the judicial process and the emotional toll it takes on those involved.

As the case progresses, the story highlights themes of truth, accountability and the delays that often characterize court proceedings. Through the experiences of the characters, the film attempts to portray the human side of the legal system and the challenges faced by ordinary citizens seeking justice.

== Cast ==
- Rajesh Sharma
- Brijendra Kala
- Neelu Kohli
- Sushil Chandrabhan Parasar
- Anju Jadhav
- Lokesh Tilakdhari
- Krishna Singh Bisht
- Avanaya Kumari
- Nandini Singh Rajput
- Syed Ubaid Hussain

== Production ==
Media reports have described the film as a courtroom-based drama focusing on themes related to the Indian legal system. The film was shot primarily on location in Meerut, Uttar Pradesh.The film is produced by Lovely Films Pvt. Ltd. and is associated with Panorama Studios International Ltd. for distribution and release.

== Release ==
The film was released theatrically on 13 March 2026 in India. The trailer was released in February 2026.

== Soundtrack ==
Kissa Court Kachehari Ka

Soundtrack album by Pravesh Mallick
- Released: 27 February 2026
- Genre: Feature film soundtrack
- Label: Panorama Music
External audio
- Song (Sawariya) on YouTube

The film's music is composed by Pravesh Mallick. The song "Sawariya" was released on 27 February 2026 and is sung by Neha Priyadarshini and Pravesh Mallick.

No.	Title	Lyrics	Music	Singer(s)	Length
1.	"Sawariya"	Pravesh Mallick	Pravesh Mallick	Neha Priyadarshini; Pravesh Mallick	03:08

== Reception ==
Following its release, the film received mixed to positive responses from critics.

A reviewer from India TV described the film as a serious courtroom drama that attempts to highlight the harsh realities of the judicial system and the struggles faced by ordinary people navigating legal battles, while also noting the performances of Rajesh Sharma and Brijendra Kala.

News18 Hindi wrote that the film attempts to present the human side of the legal system and focuses on the emotional and social dimensions of courtroom proceedings, highlighting the performances of the lead cast in conveying the narrative's themes.

Lokmat noted that the film presents a heartfelt courtroom narrative and attempts to portray the realities of the judicial process while exploring the emotional impact of legal conflicts.

Film Information critic Komal Nahta described the film as a courtroom drama that attempts to highlight issues within the judicial system but noted that the narrative moves at a slow pace and may struggle to engage a wider audience.
