= Dear Father (2022 film) =

- Official Poster
- Directed by: Umang Vyas
- Written by: Dr. Vivek Bele; Uttam Gada; Aditya Rawal
- Based on: Katkon Trikon by Vivek Bele
- Produced by: Ratan Jain; Ganesh Jain
- Starring: Paresh Rawal; Manasi Parekh; Chetan Dhanani
- Cinematography: Dhawalika Sing
- Edited by: Ketan Mandiwale
- Production company: Venus Films
- Release date: 4 March 2022
- Running time: 138 minutes
- Country: India
- Language: Gujarati

Dear Father is a 2022 Indian Gujarati-language thriller drama directed by Umang Vyas. The film stars Paresh Rawal, Manasi Parekh and Chetan Dhanani in the lead roles. It was released on 4 March 2022.

== Plot ==
Young couple Ajay (Chetan Dhanani) and Alka (Manasi Parekh) and Ajay's elderly father (Paresh Rawal). Ajay is a lawyer and Alka teaches maths in a college. They live as an average middle-class family. Behind the facade of a happy family, thing take a turn when are some mysteries revealed and secrets unfolded.

== Cast ==
- Paresh Rawal as Manu Mankad, Ajay's Father
- Manasi Parekh as Alka
- Chetan Dhanani as Ajay

== Reception ==
A critic from Cinestaan wrote that "The Gujarati feature will appeal to the older generation who will see themselves in Manu; the emotional family drama is Rawal’s show all the way". Subhash K. Jha from Firstpost wrote that "Dear Father has numerous faults. Its moral tone is distracting in its flexibility; we are supposed to dislike the father. But then we are supposed to like him for the same qualities which made him despicable in the first place".
