= Kutch Express (film) =

Gujarati film directed by Viral Shah

- Official Poster
- Directed by: Viral Shah
- Written by: Rahul Mallick
- Produced by: Parthiv Gohil; Manasi Parekh
- Starring: Ratna Pathak Shah; Manasi Parekh; Dharmendra Gohil; Darsheel Safary; Viraf Patel
- Cinematography: Dhawalika Singh
- Music by: Sachin-Jigar
- Production company: Soul Sutra
- Distributed by: Coconut Movies Release
- Release date: 6 January 2023
- Running time: 134 minutes
- Country: India
- Language: Gujarati

Kutch Express is a 2023 Indian Gujarati-language drama film directed by Viral Shah. It stars Ratna Pathak Shah, Manasi Parekh, Dharmendra Gohil, Darsheel Safary and Viraf Patel in lead roles. It is produced by Parthiv Gohil and Manasi Parekh, and distributed by Coconut Movies Release. The music is composed by Sachin-Jigar. The story of the film developed by Rahul Malick, Screenplay has been written by Rahul Malick, Karan Bhanushali, and Viraf Patel, Dialogues have been written by Raam Mori. At the 70th National Film Awards, the film won three awards, including Best Feature Film Promoting National, Social and Environmental Values.

== Plot ==
The movie follows the story of Monghi, a talented artist and married woman in the city of Bhuj, Kutch. She is a dedicated housewife who obeys her husband and strives to keep peace in the household. Her husband, Dharmesh, on the other hand, is a middle-aged man, a museum curator working with the Government of Gujarat. He is smart, dynamic and is attracted to a young associate, Mamta. After 22 years of marriage, he feels that he has been forced to stay in a loveless marriage. The women of the village have formed a sisoty (whistle), not a society (which keeps quiet), under the leadership of Baiji, an outspoken, bidi-smoking mother-in-law of Monghi. Monghi and Baiji share a fun relationship and support each other. Unfortunately, Monghi and Dharmesh's son Avinash hates his father and keeps on hoping that his mother will be able to stand up to him. One day, while going out for ice cream, Monghi meets Mamta and realises his attraction to her. Soon, the village women start talking about the affair. Baiji decides to teach him a lesson, but Monghi is determined to bring her husband back. She is sad and upset, but does everything in her power to keep the marriage together. In the meantime, she meets Madan (an international artist), who encourages her to find herself. Dharmesh is slightly jealous, and Monghi sees this as a hope for their marriage. It is soon revealed that Mamta was an ex-girlfriend of Avinash. Even this does not deter Dharmesh from continuing his affair with Mamta. As a last resort, Monghi buys tickets for both of her and Dharmesh, wherein she suggests that she would change for him. But rebuffs her and decides to marry Mamta. Ultimately, Baiji and Avinash are able to prove to Monghi too, that she was in a loveless marriage, which was stopping her from pursuing her dreams. She decides to divorce Dharmesh. Dharmesh is relieved and offers a hand of friendship to Monghi. In the last scene, Madan, Avinash, and women of the sisoty convince both Monghi and Baiji to travel to Mumbai, where they can realise their dreams.

== Cast ==
- Ratna Pathak Shah as Baiji
- Manasi Parekh as Monghi
- Dharmendra Gohil as Dharmesh
- Viraf Patel as Madan
- Darsheel Safary as Avinash
- Heena Varde as Mamta
- Reeva Rachh as Stuti
- Kumkum Das as Shobhna
- Margi Desai as Kanku
- Bhumika Barot as Jivi
- Denisha Ghumra as Kanchan
- Kaushambi Bhatt as Diwali

== Production ==
It is produced by Parthiv Gohil and Manasi Parekh under banner of Soul Sutra. It is shot in Kutch district, Gujarat, India. Darsheel Safary, Ratna Pathak Shah and Viraf Patel debuted in Gujarati cinema with the film.

== Soundtrack ==
Kutch Express

Studio album by Sachin–Jigar
- Released: 14 December 2022
- Genre: Feature film soundtrack
- Label: Gujarati Jalso

All lyrics are written by Sneha Desai; all music is composed by Sachin-Jigar.

Tracklist
No.	Title	Lyrics	Music	Singer(s)	Length
1.	"Mangamta Divso"	Sneha Desai	Sachin-Jigar	Parthiv Gohil & Manasi Parekh	3:42
2.	"Ude Re Gulaal"	Sneha Desai	Sachin-Jigar	Bhoomi Trivedi & Keerthi Sagathia	5:02
3.	"Udvu Chhe Aakash Ma"	Sneha Desai	Sachin-Jigar	Divya Kumar, Jahnvi Shrimankar	4:21

== Marketing and release ==
The poster was revealed on 9 November 2022. The film was theatrically released on 6 January 2023.

== Reception and accolades ==
Harsh Desai of Mid-Day Gujarati praised the chemistry of Mansi Gohil and Ratna Pathak Shah as well as dialogues by Ram Mori and rated the film 3 out of 5 stars.

At the 70th National Film Awards, the film won three awards, Best Feature Film Promoting National, Social and Environmental Values, Best Actress in a Leading Role (Parekh), and Best Costume Design (Niki Joshi).

== See also ==
- List of Gujarati films of 2023
