= Maharani (2025 film) =

2025 film directed by Viral Shah

- Official Poster
- Gujarati: મહારાણી
- Directed by: Viral Shah
- Written by: Raam Mori; Hardik Sangani
- Produced by: Kumar Mangat Pathak; Abhishek Pathak; Pritesh Thakkar; Madhu Sharma; Viral Shah; Murlidhar Chhatwani (Co Producer); Chandresh Bhanushali (Co Producer); Suchin Ahluwalia (Co Producer); Masumeh Makhija (Co Producer)
- Starring: Manasi Parekh; Shraddha Dangar; Ojas Rawal; Sanjay Goradia
- Cinematography: Dhawalika Singh
- Edited by: Viral Vajani
- Music by: Parth Bharat Thakkar
- Production companies: Panorama Studios; Monkey God Entertainment; Summit Studios; Eka Entertainment Production
- Distributed by: Panorama Studios
- Release date: 1 August 2025
- Running time: 143 minutes
- Country: India
- Language: Gujarati

Maharani is a 2025 Gujarati family drama, directed by Viral Shah. Starring Manasi Parekh, Shraddha Dangar Ojas Rawal, Sanjay Goradia and others. The film is a remake of the 2024 Marathi film Nach Ga Ghuma.

== Plot ==
A working mom and her witty housekeeper navigate their complex relationship while managing home and career. Their love-hate dynamic unfolds in this relatable comedy.

== Cast ==
- Manasi Parekh as Manasi
- Shraddha Dangar as Rani
- Ojas Rawal as Jignesh
- Sanjay Goradia as Rambo
- Kaushambi Bhatt as Kajal
- Binda Rawal as Pravina
- Dilip Rawal as Gordhan
- Surbhi Zaveri Vyas as Surbhi
- Tarjanee Bhadla as Charubala
- Kavin Jani as Kaushik
- Nilesh Pandya as Makwana
- Pranav Tripathi as Pranav

== Soundtrack ==
Maharani

Studio album by Parth Bharat Thakkar
- Released: 2025
- Recorded: 2025
- Genre: Feature film soundtrack
- Length: 13:03
- Language: Gujarati
- Label: Panorama Music
External audio
- Maharani Full Album on JioSaavn

=== Tracklist ===
All lyrics are written by Humayun Makrani; all music is composed by Parth Bharat Thakkar.

No.	Title	Lyrics	Music	Singer(s)	Length
1.	"Maharani - Title Track"	Humayun Makrani	Parth Bharat Thakkar	Manasi Parekh; Jahnvi Shrimankar	3:11
2.	"Mumbaiya Gujarati"	Humayun Makrani	Parth Bharat Thakkar	Parth Bharat Thakkar; Viraj Ghelani	2:58
3.	"Neendardi Re"	Humayun Makrani	Parth Bharat Thakkar	Jahnvi Shrimankar	3:27
4.	"Neendardi Re (Male Version)"	Humayun Makrani	Parth Bharat Thakkar	Parth Bharat Thakkar	3:27
Total length:					13:03

== Production ==
The film was shot in 19 days at various locations in Mumbai.

== Marketing and Releases ==
The film was announced on 25 April 2025 through social media. Its official poster was released on 1 July 2025, followed by the teaser on 2 July 2025. The trailer was launched on 10 July 2025 on YouTube and social media platforms, coinciding with Mansi Parekh’s birthday.

== Reception ==
Maharani received a positive response from critics. Divya Bhaskar rated the film 3.5 out of 5, praising its unique subject and performances. Manasi Parekh and Shraddha Dangar were particularly noted for their roles, with Shraddha being described as the "soul of the film." The supporting cast, direction by Viral Shah, and background score by Parth Bharat Thakkar were also appreciated, although the film’s limited setting and visible sponsor placements were mentioned as drawbacks.

== See also ==
- List of Gujarati films of 2025
