= Shubhchintak =

2025 Indian Gujarati Crime thriller film

- Official Poster
- Directed by: Nisarg Vaidya
- Written by: Viraf Patell; Kapil Sahetya; Chetan Daiya
- Produced by: Parthiv Gohil; Manasi Parekh; Dhaval Thakkar (Co Producer)
- Starring: Swapnil Joshi; Manasi Parekh; Viraf Patell; Deep Vaidya; Mehul Buch; Tusharika Rajyaguru
- Cinematography: Dhawalika Singh
- Edited by: Faisal Mahadik
- Music by: Manoj Krishna
- Production companies: Soul Sutra; RD Brothers Movies
- Distributed by: Rupam Entertainment Pvt Ltd
- Release date: 30 May 2025
- Running time: 141 minutes
- Country: India
- Language: Gujarati

Shubhchintak is a 2025 Indian Gujarati Crime thriller and drama film directed by Nisarg Vaidya and written by Viraf Patell, Kapil Sahetya and Chetan Daiya. It Stars Swapnil Joshi, Manasi Parekh, Viraf Patell, Deep Vaidya, Mehul Buch, Tusharika Rajyaguru and others. The film is produced by Parthiv Gohil, Manasi Parekh and co-produced by Dhaval Thakkar and it will be released on 30 May 2025.

== Plot ==
Novice Meghna and her two accomplices plot to honey trap Sanjay for revenge, facing humorous and moral challenges. Will she let revenge consume her?

== Cast ==
- Swapnil Joshi as Vishwas
- Manasi Parekh as Meghana
- Viraf Patell as Sanjay
- Deep Vaidya as Jignesh
- Mehul Buch as Dhananjay
- Tusharika Rajyaguru as Tammana
- Nisarg Trivedii as ACB Firoz
- Esha Kansara as Aisha
- Morli Patel
- Hitu Kanodia
- Kenil Kakdiya

== Soundtrack ==
Shubhchintak

Studio album by Manoj Krishna
- Released: 2025
- Genre: Feature film soundtrack
- Length: 6:32
- Language: Gujarati
- Label: Soul Sutra LLP
External audio
- Shubhchintak Full Album on JioSaavn

=== Tracklist ===
All lyrics are written by Bhargav Purohit, Priya Saraiya; all music is composed by Manoj Krishna.

| No. | Title | Lyrics | Music | Singer(s) | Length |
|---|---|---|---|---|---|
| 1. | "Ghor Andhari Re" | Bhargav Purohit | Manoj Krishna | Parthiv Gohil, Manoj Krishna | 2:40 |
| 2. | "Prem Na Kare" | Priya Saraiya | Manoj Krishna | Manasi Parekh | 3:52 |
| Total length: | | | | | 06:32 |

== Production ==
The shooting of the film began on 17 December 2024, alongside the official announcement introducing the lead cast, shared through the production house Soul Sutra's social media platforms. Filming was completed on 20 January 2025. Lead actor and producer Manasi Parekh shared wrap-up photos and videos on social media following the completion of the shoot.

== Reception ==
Kanksha Vasavada of Times of India said that “While the premise (revenge) isn’t entirely new, impressive execution makes Shubhchintak stand out.”

== Marketing and Releases ==
The film was officially announced on 17 December 2024, coinciding with the commencement of principal photography and the introduction of the cast. The release date was announced on 28 February 2025 via social media platforms. The official poster was unveiled on 14 April 2025, followed by the release of the teaser on 22 April 2025, both through social media channels.

== See also ==
- List of Gujarati films of 2025
- List of Gujarati films
