= Parthiv Gohil =

- Born: 18 February 1976 (age 50); Bhavnagar, Gujarat, India
- Occupations: Playback singer, conceptualizer, composer
- Website: http://parthivgohil.com

Parthiv Gohil (born 18 February 1976) is a playback singer for Indian films including Devdas, Saawariya, Saheb Biwi Aur Gangster, and Kisaan. He is known in Gujarati Cinema for hit songs Aasmani, Thai Jashe, and Soni Gujarati Ni. He co-produced 2020 Romantic Gujarati movie Golkeri. He produced Kutch Express, which got released on January 6, 2023. Gohil also produced Shubhchintak, scheduled for release on 30 May 2025.

== Background ==
Gohil was introduced to classical music by his great-grandfather and father. Aged 10, he began lessons with Smt. Bhanuben Solanki, Smt. Dakshaben Mehta, and Shri Laxmipati Shukla, a disciple of Omkarnath Thakur. Aged 14, he won the Pandit Omkarnath Thakur Competition, which was followed by the state talent search competition.

Under SPICMACAY's gurukul scholarship scheme, he was chosen to be trained under Zia Fariduddin Dagar, a descendant of Tansen. From him, Gohil learned the tenets of voice culture. Under the aegis of SPICMACAY, he accompanied maestros such as Hariprasad Chaurasia, Sultan Khan, the Gundecha Brothers and V. G. Jog on tanpura.

He was a runner-up in the TV show Sa Re Ga Ma Pa, which was judged by Jasraj, Parveen Sultana, Khayyam, O P Nayyar, Kalyanji Anandji, Anil Biswas, and Jagjit Singh. Gohil is now hosting the same show on Alpha Gujarati channel of ZEE.

Gohil now lives in Mumbai. His work as a film singer started with the title song and some back vocals for Sanjay Leela Bhansali's film Devdas. He made his debut as a playback singer in Bhansali's film Saawariya, subsequently singing for films like EMI, Heroes, Vaada Raha, Kisaan, Saheb Biwi aur Gangster and others.

Gohil was the only Gujarati artist to be featured in the National Iconic Song "Phir Mile Sur Mera Tumhara". Recently, he was also featured on the MTV India show Coke Studio, along with artists like Ustad Rashid Khan and Richa Sharma. He popularized Gujarati Music through his live performances in India.

== Personal life ==
He is married to actress Manasi Parekh and has a daughter named Nirvi Gohil.

== Filmography ==
Parthiv Gohil has lent his voice to many Hindi and Gujarati film songs. Here are the list of the movies.

- Bas Ek Chance
- Commitment
- Devdas
- Desh Devi
- Dum
- EMI
- Family Circus
- Golkeri (2020)
- Heroes
- Hu Tu Tu Tu
- Jalsaghar
- Kevi Rite Jaish
- Kissan
- Saawariya
- Saheb Biwi Aur Gangster
- Oxygen
- Patel Ki Punjabi Shaadi
- Thai Jashe
- Ventilator
- Vitamin She
- Nayika Devi: The Warrior Queen
- Medal
- Kutch Express
- Laalo – Krishna Sada Sahaayate (As a Producer and Singer)
- Mitrata (As a Producer and Singer)
