= Mitrata (film) =

2026 Indian Gujarati drama film

- Official Poster
- Directed by: Oneel Karnik
- Written by: Bhavik Pandya
- Produced by: Parthiv Gohil; Manasi Parekh
- Starring: Viraj Ghelani; Deep Vaidya; Vishal Parekh; Vishwaa Joshi
- Cinematography: Utkarsh Marulkar
- Edited by: Arun Chelani
- Music by: Parthiv Shah
- Production company: Soul Sutra Studios
- Distributed by: Rupam Entertainment
- Release date: 25 September 2026
- Running time: 116 minutes
- Country: India
- Language: Gujarati

Mitrata (transl. Friendship) is a 2026 Gujarati-language comedy-drama film directed by Oneel Karnik and written by Bhavik Pandya. It stars Viraj Ghelani, Deep Vaidya, Vishal Parekh, Vishwaa Joshi and others. The film is produced by Parthiv Gohil and Manasi Parekh under the banner of Soul Sutra Studios, with Jash Vira Films as co-producer. The film was released theatrically on 25 September 2026.

== Plot ==
The film follows three friends as they navigate changes in their lives and maintain their friendship over time. The story explores the challenges they face and the enduring nature of their relationship.

== Cast ==
- Viraj Ghelani as Abhin Pandya
- Deep Vaidya as Moksh Desai
- Vishal Parekh as Ved Joshi
- Vishwaa Joshi as Jiya Shah
- Arjun Srivastava as Baakdo
- Ankit Gajera as Sam
- Ajaaz Shaikh as Ethi
- Ekanshi Marfatia
- Kinnari Dave
- Heer Dobariya as Ambalal

== Soundtrack ==
Mitrata

Soundtrack album
- Released: 2026
- Genre: Feature film soundtrack
- Length: 17:13
- Language: Gujarati
- Label: Soul Sutra Music
External audio
- Mitrata Full Album on JioSaavn

=== Track listing ===
All lyrics are written by Joy Mehta and Divyesh Mungra; all music is composed by Parthiv Shah.

Track listing
| No. | Title | Lyrics | Music | Singer(s) | Length |
|---|---|---|---|---|---|
| 1. | "Mitrata Anthem" | Joy Mehta | Parthiv Shah | Amit Trivedi, Joy Mehta | 4:52 |
| 2. | "Aavya Che Shaana" | Joy Mehta, Divyesh Mungra | Parthiv Shah | Nakash Aziz, Arvind Vegda, Parthiv Gohil | 3:26 |
| 3. | "Lagan Lagan" | Divyesh Mungra | Parthiv Shah | Mika Singh | 2:46 |
| 4. | "Mitrata Reprise" | Divyesh Mungra | Parthiv Shah | Neeti Mohan | 6:09 |
| Total length: | | | | | 17:13 |

== Production ==
The film was shot in Surat and Diu, India.

== Release ==
The film was announced on 24 June 2026. The teaser was released on 1 September 2026. The trailer was released on 11 September 2026 through social media platforms and YouTube. The film was released theatrically on 25 September 2026.

== See also ==
- List of Gujarati films of 2026
- List of Gujarati films
