= 13 Mussoorie =

- Promotional release poster
- Genre: Thriller
- Written by: Karmanya Ahuja
- Directed by: Abhijit Das
- Starring: Shriya Pilgaonkar; Viraf Patel; Naveed Aslam
- Country of origin: India
- Original language: Hindi
- No. of episodes: 13

Production
- Cinematography: Jesil Patel
- Editor: Kathikuloth Praveen
- Camera setup: Multi-camera
- Running time: 19-22 minutes
- Production company: Bodhi Tree Multimedia

Original release
- Network: Viu
- Release: 12 October – 14 December 2018

13 Mussoorie is an Indian Hindi-language thriller television series directed by Abhijit Das and written by Karmanya Ahuja. Produced under Bodhi Tree Multimedia, it stars Shriya Pilgaonkar, Viraf Patel and Naveed Aslam. The series premiered on Viu on 12 October 2018.

== Cast ==
- Shriya Pilgaonkar as Aditi Bisht
- Viraf Patel as Rishi Pant
- Naveed Aslam as Ajay Bisht
- Kashyap Shangari as Mahesh Anand
- Shray Rai Tiwari as Ali
- Teena Singh as Nisha Gosain
- Mrinal Dutt as Ishaan Saini
- Mir Sarwar as Girish Rawat
- Varun Tiwari as Varun Rawat
- Ashwini Koul as Naman Joshi
- Jay Bodas as Freddy Fernandez

== Production ==
The series was announced on Viu. The trailer of the series teaser was released on 5 October 2018.

== Reception ==
Archika Khurana of The Times of India rated the series 2.5/5 stars. Aditi Singh of SpotboyE gave the series three-and-a-half out of five stars. A critic from News18 India reviewed the series.
