= All the Best Pandya =

2025 Indian Gujarati family drama film

- Official Poster
- Directed by: Rahul Bhole; Vinit Kanojia
- Written by: Ankit Brahmbhatt [Concept]; Prem Gadhavi [Story, Screenplay, Dialogue, Concept]; Nikita Shah [Story, Screenplay, Dialogue, Concept]; Aditi Varma [Story, Screenplay, Dialogue, Concept]
- Produced by: Jeegar Chauhan; Malhar Thakar; Jigar Parmar; Jimmy Satish Asija
- Starring: Malhar Thakar; Darshan Jariwala; Vandana Pathak; Yukti Randeria
- Cinematography: Suman Kumar Sahu
- Edited by: Rahul Bhole; Vinit Kanojia
- Music by: Prashant Satose
- Production company: Jeegar Chauhan Productions
- Distributed by: Panorama Studios
- Release date: 14 March 2025
- Running time: 140 mpinutes
- Country: India
- Language: Gujarati

All the Best Pandya is a 2025 Indian Gujarati family drama film directed and edited by Rahul Bhole and Vinit Kanojia. It Stars Malhar Thakar, Darshan Jariwala, Vandana Pathak, Yukti Randeria and others. The film is produced by Jeegar Chauhan, Malhar Thakar, Jigar Parmar and Jimmy Satish Asija and it was released nationwide on 14 March 2025.

== Plot ==
Akshay Pandya and his father, Hasmukh Pandya, share a complicated bond, often avoiding direct confrontations. Their lives take an unexpected turn when Hasmukh, a principled and honest man, is accused of bribery. With the legal system failing to secure his release, Akshay steps into the courtroom to fight for his father's justice. Blending emotional depth with gripping courtroom drama, the film explores the complexities of their relationship while unraveling a case that challenges integrity, family, and the truth.

== Cast ==
- Malhar Thakar as Akshay Pandya
- Darshan Jariwala as Hasmukh Pandya
- Vandana Pathak as Indu
- Yukti Randeria as Bhoomi
- Smit Joshi as Fenku
- Prem Gadhavi as Mudresh
- Archan Trivedi as Kishor
- Dhara Shah as Manisha Bhabhi
- Satish Bhatt as Dr. Majumdar
- Nisarg Trivedi as Lawyer Mukul Desai
- Lipi Trivedi as Maitri
- Kartavya Shah as Manan Talati
- Firoz Irani as Judge
- Bhargav Joshi as Arvind
- Nikita Shah as News Anchor
- Urmila Solanki as Sneha
- Hiranya Zinzuwadia as Young Akshay
- Pratham Patel as Spiritual Guru
- Sandeep Prajapati as Nago
- vedish jhaveri as Mr khemani

== Soundtrack ==
All the Best Pandya

Studio album by Prashant Satose
- Released: 2025
- Genre: Feature film soundtrack
- Length: 12:55
- Language: Gujarati
External audio
- All The Best Pandya Full Album on JioSaavn

=== Tracklist ===
All lyrics are written by Bhargav Purohit, Parth Tarpara, Dilip Rawal; all music is composed by Prashant Satose.

No.	Title	Lyrics	Music	Singer(s)	Length
1.	"Tom and Jerry"	Bhargav Purohit	Prashant Satose	Hariom Gadhvi	2:48
2.	"Jung"	Parth Tarpara	Prashant Satose	Aditya Gadhvi	3:16
3.	"Vaari Gayo"	Bhargav Purohit	Prashant Satose	Jigardan Gadhavi	3:41
4.	"Kaink Bolo Have"	Dilip Rawal	Prashant Satose	Aamir Mir	3:10
Total length:					12:55

== Marketing and Releases ==
The film was announced on 5 February 2025, along with its release date. The film's official poster was revealed on 19 February 2025, and the teaser was released on 21 February 2025. The film theatrically released on 14 March 2025, coinciding with Holi.

A report revealed that two night shows of Sikandar at a cinema hall in Surat were replaced with All the Best Pandya and Umbarro, as both Gujarati films have been attracting a large audience. A trade analyst, Kirtibhai T. Vaghasiya from Surat, was quoted by Bollywood Hungama, confirming the replacement and noting the strong demand for these films.

== Reception ==
According to Pinkvilla, the film had the highest opening for a Gujarati film in 2025.

== See also ==
- List of Gujarati films of 2025
- List of Gujarati films
