= Shatak: Sangh Ke 100 Varsh =

2026 Indian film by Aashish Mall

- Theatrical release poster
- Directed by: Aashish Mall
- Written by: Anil Agarwal; Utsav Dan; Rohit Gehlot; Nitin Sawant
- Produced by: Vir Kapur; Co-Producer: Aashish Tiwari
- Narrated by: Ajay Devgn
- Cinematography: Mb Vijay Kumar
- Edited by: Chin2 Singh
- Production company: Ada 360 Degree
- Distributed by: Panorama Studios
- Release date: 20 February 2026
- Running time: 112 minutes
- Country: India
- Language: Hindi

Shatak: Sangh Ke 100 Varsh (transl. Centenary: 100 Years of the Sangh) is an Indian film directed by Aashish Mall, produced by Vir Kapur and co-produced by Aashish Tiwari under the banner of Ada 360 Degree. The film revisits the 100-years history of the Rashtriya Swayamsevak Sangh (RSS), a Hindu nationalist organisation that has played a significant role in India's cultural, social, and political spheres and has been the subject of varying interpretations and debate.

Ajay Devgn provided the narration for the film. 'Shatak: Sangh Ke 100 Varsh' released in theatres on 20 February 2026.

== Plot ==
Narrated by Ajay Devgn, 'Shatak: Sangh Ke 100 Varsh' is a documentary chronicling a hundred years of work by the two founding figures of the Rashtriya Swayamsevak Sangh — Dr. Keshav Baliram Hedgewar and Guruji Madhav Sadasiva Golwalkar, who continued to consolidate and expand the RSS against considerable opposition.

== Releases ==
Trailer of 'Shatak: Sangh Ke 100 Varsh' released on 12 February 2026. Film released in theatres across India on 20 February 2026. The film was declared tax free in Madhya Pradesh.

== Reception ==
Ronak Kotecha of The Times of India said that "Ultimately, Shatak is a technically superlative documentary that attempts to spotlight an organisation and its leaders through a distinctly reverential lens, recreating the era with remarkable visual finesse." Nandini Ramnath of Scroll.in said that "Shatak is recruitment video, tutorial and pat on the back rolled into one. Released in cinemas to mark the Rashtriya Swayamsevak Sangh’s centenary, the propaganda project is well suited to play on a loop in the lobbies of the Sangh’s ever-sprouting branch offices." Simran Singh of DNA India said that "Shatak is more than historical recounting. It's an emotional, eye-opening study of conviction and service. It turns debate into empathy and shows that behind every movement are people."
