= Shraddha Dangar =

Indian film actress

- Born: 15 October 1994 (age 32); Rajkot, Gujarat, India
- Occupations: Actress, Model
- Years active: 2017–present
- Spouse: Akash Pandya (m. 2024)

Shraddha Dangar (born 15 October 1994) is a national award winning Indian actress from Gujarat, India. She is known for Hellaro (2019), machhachu (2018), kasoombo (2024), mansion 24 (telugu/hindi) (2024) and Pappa Tamne Nahi Samjaay (2017) and Luv Ni Love Storys (2020).

== Career ==
Shraddha made her debut in the movie Pappa Tamney Nai Samjaay (2017) starring Bhavya Gandhi, Manoj Joshi and Ketki Dave. She was also seen in a musical comedy film Tari Maate Once More (2018).

In 2019, she was part of two remarkable films that include Machchhu, based on the true events of Machchhu Dam disaster and Hellaro, which is a Gujarati period drama film.

Her film, Hellaro, which was directed by Abhishek Shah, won the National Film Award for Best Feature Film at the 66th National Film Awards and she has earned Special Jury Award for her performance.

The film has been theatrically released in India on 8 November 2019 to positive reviews and her acting is appreciated by the audiences.

== Filmography ==
=== Films ===
Key
†	Denotes films that have not yet been released

Year	Film	Director	Role	Language	Notes
2017	Pappa Tamne Nahi Samjaay	Dharmessh Mehta	Aashka	Gujarati	
2018	Tari Maate Once More	Saurin Chaoudhary	Jaadu	Gujarati	
2018	Lamboo Rastoo	Mihir Bhuta	Ragini	Gujarati	
2019	Hellaro	Abhishek Shah	Manjhri	Gujarati	
2020	Luv Ni Love Storys	Durgesh Tanna	Mishti	Gujarati	
2021	Mara Pappa Superhero	Darshan Ashwin Trivedi	Teju	Gujarati	
2022	Kehvatlal Parivar	Vipul Mehta	Heta Thakar	Gujarati	
2023	Chandalo	Hardik Gajjar	Aastha	Gujarati	
2024	Kasoombo	Vijaygiri Bava	Sujan	Gujarati	
2025	Maharani	Viral Shah	Rani	Gujarati	
2026	Paatki	Abhinay Deshmukh	Nitya Mehta	Gujarati	

=== Web series ===
Dangar has acted in the following web series:

Year	Title	Role	Language	Ref.
2019	Geet	Shraddha	Gujarati	
2019	Friend Zone	Helly	Gujarati	
2021	Vitthal Teedi	Manisha	Gujarati	
2023	Mansion 24		Telugu	

=== Music videos ===
Year	Title	Role	Singer(s)	Album	Co-Star(s)	Notes
2018	"Kahi De"		Keval Shah	"Kahi De"		
2021	Aao Na		Brijen Gajjar	Aao Na	Parth Shukla	
2021	"Radha Khovaai"		Meet Jain	Radha Khovaai		
2018	"Hind ki Rajputaniya"					

== Accolades ==
Year	Award	Category	Nominated work	Result	Ref.
2019	National Film Awards	Special Jury Award	Hellaro	Won	
