= Umbarro =

2025 Indian Gujarati Family Comedy Drama Film

- Directed by: Abhishek Shah
- Written by: Abhishek Shah; Hemant Dhome; Keyu Shah
- Produced by: Sanjay Chhabria; Falguni Patel
- Starring: Vandana Pathak; Kaajal Oza Vaidya; Suchita Trivedi; Deeksha Joshi; Tarjanee Bhadla; Tejal Panchasara; Vineeta Joshee; Aarjav Trivedi; Galsar Sanjay
- Cinematography: Tribhuvan Babu
- Edited by: Apurva Motiwale
- Music by: Mehul Surti
- Production companies: Everest Entertainment and Iraada Studioz
- Distributed by: PVR Inox Pictures
- Release date: 24 January 2025
- Running time: 137 minutes
- Country: India
- Language: Gujarati

Umbarro is a 2025 Gujarati family comedy drama film directed by Abhishek Shah. It stars Vandana Pathak, Kaajal Oza Vaidya, Suchita Trivedi, Deeksha Joshi, Tarjanee Bhadla, Tejal Panchasara, Vineeta Joshee, Aarjav Trivedi, and Galsar Sanjay in a lead role. The film is a remake of 2021 Marathi film Jhimma.

== Plot ==
Seven women from rural Gujarat embark on their first international trip to London, facing cultural clashes, language barriers, and societal stigmas along their journey to claim their space in the world.

== Cast ==
- Vandana Pathak
- Kaajal Oza Vaidya
- Suchita Trivedi
- Deeksha Joshi
- Tarjanee Bhadla
- Tejal Panchasara
- Vineeta Joshee
- Aarjav Trivedi
- Galsar Sanjay
- Ankit Patel
- Radha Patel
- Parle Patel

== Production ==
The film is a remake of 2021 Marathi film Jhimma. The film was shot primarily in London over a 21-day period.

== Soundtrack ==
Umbarro

Studio album by Mehul Surti
- Released: 2025
- Genre: Feature film soundtrack
- Length: 15:05
- Language: Gujarati

=== Tracklist ===
All lyrics are written by Bhargav Purohit; all music is composed by Mehul Surti.

| No. | Title | Lyrics | Music | Singer(s) | Length |
|---|---|---|---|---|---|
| 1. | "London Ke Limbdi" | Bhargav Purohit | Mehul Surti | Falguni Pathak, Mehul Surti | 5:00 |
| 2. | "Travel Mode" | Bhargav Purohit | Mehul Surti | Moushumi Das, Mehul Surti | 3:58 |
| 3. | "Umbarro Title Song" | Bhargav Purohit | Mehul Surti | Shruti Pathak, Mehul Surti | 6:07 |
| Total length: | | | | | 15:05 |

== Marketing and release ==
The teaser of the film released on 10 December 2025 along with the release date. The film theatrically released on 24 January 2025.

A report revealed that two night shows of Sikandar at a cinema hall in Surat were replaced with All the Best Pandya and Umbarro, as both Gujarati films have been attracting a large audience. A trade analyst, Kirtibhai T. Vaghasiya from Surat, was quoted by Bollywood Hungama, confirming the replacement and noting the strong demand for these films.

== Reception ==
According to Box Office Mojo, the film collected $86,710 in UK.

Kanksha Vasavada of The Times of India rated 4 stars out of 5, and praised cinematography, music, authentic portrayal of rural life, and director’s attention to detail. Mumbai Samachar rated it 4 out of 5 while praising direction and story.

== See also ==
- List of Gujarati films of 2025
- List of highest-grossing Gujarati films
