= Mahaprabhu Jagannath =

Indian animated film

- Directed by: Shripad Warkhedkar
- Written by: Pallavi Sharma
- Screenplay by: Pallavi Sharma
- Produced by: Durga Prasad Dalai
- Starring: Prachi Save Saathi; Sonal Kaushal; Aditya Raj Sharma
- Music by: Aviral Kumar
- Production company: Ele Animations
- Distributed by: Cinépolis; Panorama Studios (Delhi-UP only)
- Release date: 4 September 2026
- Running time: 104 minutes
- Country: India
- Languages: Hindi; Odia; Telugu

Mahaprabhu Jagannath is a 2026 Indian animated mythological film directed by Shripad Warkhedkar and produced by Durga Prasad Dalai. Written and scripted by Pallavi Sharma, the film stars Prachi Save Saathi, Sonal Kaushal and Aditya Raj Sharma. It was released theatrically in Odia, Hindi and Telugu on 4 September 2026.

== Plot ==
Set in Kaliyug, the story follows the asura Ahamasur, who traps devotees and divine beings inside a mysterious mercury world. Believing that no force can defeat him, Ahamasur attempts to establish his power over them.

To rescue the trapped beings, Mahaprabhu Jagannath, along with Balram and Garud, travels across different realms and confronts Ahamasur through wisdom rather than destruction.

The story focuses on faith, devotion and the belief that true devotion cannot be defeated.

== Cast ==
- Prachi Save Saathi as Jagan
- Sonal Kaushal as Balaram
- Aditya Raj Sharma as Ahamasur

== Production ==
The film was directed by Shripad Warkhedkar and produced by Durga Prasad Dalai, with Pallavi Sharma serving as the writer and screenplay writer. The film was produced by Ele Animations.

The film follows the creators' earlier animated series Jay Jagannath.

== Music ==
The film's title song, "Mahaprabhu Jagannath", was composed by Arijit Shrivastava, with lyrics by Atul Kumar Verma and vocals by Atharv Bakshi. Aviral Kumar composed the background score.

== Release ==
Mahaprabhu Jagannath was released theatrically on 4 September 2026 in Odia, Hindi and Telugu. The film was distributed in India by Cinépolis, with Panorama Studios handling distribution in the Delhi–Uttar Pradesh circuit.

== Reception ==
Archika Khurana of The Times of India wrote in a review "Mahaprabhu Jagannath is an earnest attempt to make mythology accessible to a younger generation. Its imaginative worlds, energetic voice acting and flashes of impressive CGI make it a reasonably engaging family watch, even if its uneven animation and familiar storytelling limit its impact." Anurag Singh Bohra of India Today wrote in a review, "Mahaprabhu Jagannath is a sincere devotional saga that celebrates the triumph of good over evil. With colorful visuals, spirited voice performances, and an accessible approach to mythology, it offers an engaging experience for family audiences and young viewers, despite occasional pacing lags and uneven animation." Simran Singh of DNA India wrote in a review "Mahaprabhu Jagannath is a must-watch, not only for kids, but also for adults. Leave everything aside, and take your kid to this film. There are hardly any good animated flicks for kids in India. After Mahavatar Narsimha, Mahaprabhu Jagannath is another flick that should be enjoyed on the big screen. It will set a good precedent for other makers to churn out more animated flicks, an unexplored territory waiting to get its due."
