= Golkeri =

2020 Indian film by Viral Shah

- Golkeri Official poster
- Directed by: Viral Shah
- Written by: Viral Shah; Amatya
- Produced by: Manasi Parekh; Parthiv Gohil
- Starring: Malhar Thakar; Manasi Parekh; Sachin Khedekar; Vandana Pathak
- Cinematography: Vikas Joshi
- Edited by: Parth-Gaurang
- Music by: Salil Amrute
- Production company: Soul Sutra
- Distributed by: Coconut Movies Release
- Release date: 28 February 2020
- Running time: 128 minutes
- Country: India
- Language: Gujarati
- Box office: est. ₹9 crore (US$940,000)

Golkeri (Mango pickle) is a 2020 Indian Gujarati comedy drama film directed by Viral Shah and produced by Manasi Parekh and Parthiv Gohil under banner of Soul Sutra Studio. It is written by Viral Shah and Amatya. The film starring Malhar Thakar and Manasi Parekh is a remake of 2017 Marathi film Muramba.

The story of the film follows Sahil (played by Malhar Thakar) and his girlfriend and fiancé Harshita (played by Manasi Parekh) and their breakup. His parents (played by Sachin and Vandana) try to convince Sahil to get over his differences with Harshita. The film was released in India on 28 February 2020. The theatrical run was shortened due to COVID-19 pandemic and it was subsequently released for streaming on Amazon Prime Video.

== Plot ==
Sahil and Harshita meet at a show of Harshita's. Sahil supports her the most and with his help and support, Harshita climbs great heights. From there, they get into a relationship but due to Sahil's constant lies about his unemployment, she is frustrated. Their three years of relationship is ruined overnight and their marriage is put in grave danger. On the day of the marriage anniversary of Sahil's parents, Sahil confronts his father and realizes his mistakes and hurries to meet Harshita. Sahil apologizes to Harshita and tells her his feeling and everything in his heart. Sahil falls to his knees and asks for one more chance. Harshita accepts him at last and then they once again get in a relationship.

== Cast ==
The cast include:

- Malhar Thakar as Sahil Mohanbhai Sutariya
- Manasi Parekh as Harshita
- Sachin Khedekar as Mohanbhai Sutariya
- Vandana Pathak as Jyotnsa Sutariya
- Dharmesh Vyas
- Dhwani Gautam

== Production ==
The film was shot at various places in Ahmedabad. The film was shot in 24 days. The film was produced under banner of Soul Sutra which is owned by Parthiv Gohil and Manasi Parekh Gohil. It was a debut of Manasi Parekh in Gujarati cinema. Sachin Khedekar reprise his role of a father from the original while Vandana Pathak played a mother. Both debuted Gujarati cinema with the film. Malhar Thakar played a role as their son. From the same production house they are coming up with new Gujarati movie Kuch Express starting Ratna Pathak Shah, Mansi Parekh, Dharmendra Gohil and Darshil Safary.

== Soundtrack ==
Golkeri

Soundtrack album by Mika Singh, Hrishikesh-Saurabh-Jasraj
- Released: 27 January 2020
- Recorded: 2019
- Studio: Aditya Dev Studio
- Genre: Feature film soundtrack
- Length: 5:37
- Language: Gujarati
- Label: Zen Music Gujarati
External audio
- Album on JioSaavn

"Soni Gujarat Ni" was the first Gujarati song sung by Mika Singh. The song videos were choreographed by Prince Gupta. Social media influencers Aashna Hegde and Khushi Hegde appeared in "Soni Gujarat Ni" song.

Track listing
No.	Title	Lyrics	Music	Singer(s)	Length
1.	"Soni Gujarat Ni"	Kiran Parihar	Mika Singh	Mika Singh, Parthiv Gohil	3:07
2.	"Amastu Amastu"	Sneha Desai	Hrishikesh-Saurabh-Jasraj	Parthiv Gohil	2:30
Total length:					5:37

== Marketing and release ==
The songs were released on YouTube. The film released its poster and title on 5 February 2020. Two days later, the official trailer of the film was released by Zen Music Gujarati on 7 February 2020.

The film was released in India on 28 February 2020. The theatrical run was shortened due to COVID-19 pandemic and it was subsequently released for streaming on Amazon Prime Video.

== Reception ==
=== Box office ===
The film grossed ₹3 crore (US$310,000) in the opening weekend and ₹4 crore (US$420,000) in the first week. The film had grossed over about ₹9 crore (US$940,000) on the box office in 17 days before the theatres were closed due to COVID-19 pandemic.

=== Critical reception ===
The film is received positively. Shreya Iyer of The Times of India gave it 3.5 out of 5. She praised the performances, production and background score while pointed out that the film is "bit too stretched at some places" but the second half is gripping. The VTV Gujarati team called the film family-friendly and predictable. They praised it for story, script and performances but criticised the dialogues of parents and the lack of clarity in the theme.

=== Accolades ===
The film received the best film award at the Toronto Gujarati Iconic Film Festival 2020.
