= Kaashi Raaghav =

2025 Gujarati-language film by Dhruv Goswami

- Official poster
- Directed by: Dhruv Goswami
- Written by: Jhanvi Chopda; Dhruv Goswami
- Produced by: Dhanpal Shah; Shweta Shah
- Starring: Deeksha Joshi; Jayesh More; Pihushree Ghadvi; Shruhad Goswami; Preeti Daas
- Cinematography: Pratik Parmar
- Edited by: Jigar Chauhan; Shivam Bhatt
- Music by: Vatsal Goswami; Kavan Bhatt
- Production company: Dhanpal FIlms
- Distributed by: Rupam Entertainment
- Release date: 3 January 2025
- Running time: 130 minutes
- Country: India
- Language: Gujarati
- Box office: est. ₹1.35 crore

Kaashi Raaghav is a 2025 Gujarati-language drama film directed by Dhruv Goswami and produced by Dhanpal Films. The film features Deeksha Joshi as Kaashi and Jayesh More as Raaghav in the lead roles, with Shruhad Goswami, Preeti Daas and child artist Pihushree Gadhvi in supporting roles.

== Plot ==
The story revolves around the interconnected lives of a mother, a truck driver, and a lost child. Set in Kolkata, Varanasi and Gujarat, the film explores their struggles with guilt, betrayal, and the search for redemption.

== Cast ==
- Deeksha Joshi as Kaashi
- Jayesh More as Raaghav
- Shruhad Goswami as Ghanoo
- Pihushree Gadhvi as Shobhita
- Preeti Daas as Chandni
- Saikat Sengupta as Warehouse staff
- Aurobindo Ghosh as Doctor

== Production ==
The screenplay was written by Jatan Pandya, Jhanvi Chopda, and Dhruv Goswami. Music for the film was composed by Vatsal Goswami and Kavan Bhatt, while Pratik Parmar handled cinematography. The casting for the film was directed by Avani Soni and filming locations included Gujarat, Varanasi, and Kolkata.

== Release ==
The film was released in theaters on 3 January 2025.

== Reception ==
The film received mixed to positive reviews. VTV Gujarati praised the performances, music, and cinematography but criticized the narrative's inconsistency and a weaker second half. Gujcinema.com rated the film 4/5, commending it for its bold storytelling, emotional depth, and strong performances, particularly by Deeksha Joshi and Jayesh More, while noting issues with pacing and dubbing. The review highlighted the film's departure from conventional Gujarati cinema, describing it as a fresh and daring exploration of complex themes. Yesha Bhatt from The Times of India rated 4.5 stars out of 5, describing it as "a film that you would want to re-watch for its brilliance." She praised the sensitive handling of its subject, stellar performances by Deeksha Joshi and Jayesh More, and the captivating cinematography by Pratik Parmar. The film's music, particularly the songs Nindru Re and Maa Ganga, was lauded for its emotional resonance. Bhatt commended the multi-lingual dialogues and the vivid depiction of locations like Varanasi, Kolkata, and Mumbai, making the film feel more universal than regional. She recommended it as a visually stunning and emotionally gripping watch.
