= Dhoom Dhaam =

Dhoom Dhaam (lit. 'Fanfare') may refer to:

- Dhoom Dhaam (2024 film), an Indian Telugu-language feature film
- Dhoom Dhaam (2025 film), an Indian Hindi-language feature film

== See also ==
- Dhaam Dhoom, 2008 Indian Tamil-language film
