= Panorama Studios =

Indian film production and distribution company

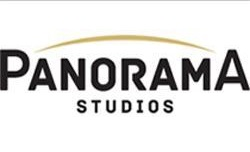
- Type: Private
- Industry: Media & Entertainment
- Founded: 2005
- Founder: Kumar Mangat Pathak
- Headquarters: Mumbai, Maharashtra, India
- Key people: Kumar Mangat Pathak; Abhishek Pathak
- Products: Film distributor
- Subsidiaries: Panorama Studios International Ltd; Panorama Studios Distribution LLP; Brain On Rent; Panorama Spotlight; Panorama Music

Panorama Studios (formerly Big Screen Entertainment & Wide Frame Pictures) is an Indian film production and distribution company founded by Kumar Mangat Pathak.

== Filmography ==
=== Production ===
Key
†	Denotes films that have not yet been released

List of Panorama Studios film production credits
Year	Title	Language	Ref.
2006	Omkara	Hindi	
2007	No Smoking	Hindi	
2008	Sunday	Hindi	
2008	One Two Three	Hindi	
2008	Haal-e-Dil	Hindi	
2008	Money Hai Toh Honey Hai	Hindi	
2009	All The Best: Fun Begins	Hindi	
2010	Atithi Tum Kab Jaoge?	Hindi	
2010	Aakrosh	Hindi	
2010	Toonpur Ka Superhero	Hindi	
2011	Dil Toh Baccha Hai Ji	Hindi	
2012	Pyaar Ka Punchnama	Hindi	
2012	Bittoo Boss	Hindi	
2013	Akaash Vani	Hindi	
2013	Special 26	Hindi	
2013	Aatma	Hindi	
2015	Alone	Hindi	
2015	Pyaar Ka Punchnama 2	Hindi	
2015	Drishyam	Hindi	
2017	Guest iin London	Hindi	
2018	Raid	Hindi	
2018	Savita Damodar Paranjpe	Marathi	
2019	Ye Re Ye Re Paisa 2	Marathi	
2019	Ujda Chaman	Hindi	
2019	Pagalpanti	Hindi	
2019	Section 375	Hindi	
2020	Khuda Haafiz	Hindi	
2020	Dybbuk	Hindi	
2022	Dehati Disco	Hindi	
2022	Khuda Haafiz: Chapter 2 – Agni Pariksha	Hindi	
2022	Siya	Hindi	
2022	Drishyam 2	Hindi	
2023	Hu ane Tu	Gujarati	
2024	Shaitaan	Hindi	
2024	The Lost Girl	Hindi	
2024	Gharat Ganpati	Marathi	
2024	Auron Mein Kahan Dum Tha	Hindi	
2024	Mr. Bachchan	Telugu	
2024	Phullwanti	Marathi	
2024	Parab	Odia	
2025	Daveed	Malayalam	
2025	Raid 2	Hindi	
2025	Maa	Hindi	
2026	Ranapati Shivray: Swari Agra	Marathi	
2026	Dhamaal 4	Hindi	
2026	Unmadham	Malayalam	
2026	Kankaan De Ohle	Punjabi	
2026	Tujhya Aaila	Marathi	
2026	Drishyam: The Conclusion	Hindi	
2026	Aadi Anant	Marathi	
2026	70 Syaal	Punjabi	
2027	Harivarasanam †	Malayalam	
2027	Rakta Phal †	Marathi	

== Films distributed ==
- Gabbar Is Back (2015)
- Mastizaade (2016)
- Azhar (2016)
- Rustom (2016)
- Veerey Ki Wedding (2018)
- Satyameva Jayate (2018)
- Bogda (Marathi) (2018)
- Batti Gul Meter Chalu (2018)
- Baazaar (2018)
- PM Narendra Modi (2019)
- Batla House (2019)
- Chicken Curry Law (2019)
- Ye Re Ye Re Paisa 2 (Marathi) (2024)
- Sab Kushal Mangal (2020)
- Fauji Calling (2021)
- Vakeel Saab (2021)
- Runway 34 (2022)
- Achena Uttam (Bengali) (2022)
- Funral (Marathi) (2022)
- Naadi Dosh (Gujarati) (2022)
- Raado (Gujarati) (2022)
- Chabutro (Gujarati) (2022)
- Tarri (Marathi) (2023)
- Raundal (Marathi) (2023)
- Get Together (Marathi) (2023)
- Boyz 4 (Marathi) (2023)
- Daman (Odia) (2023)
- Bholaa (2023)
- Shaitaan (2024)
- Nach Ga Ghuma (Marathi) (2024)
- Gharat Ganpati (Marathi) (2024)
- Auron Mein Kahan Dum Tha (2024)
- Khel Khel Mein (2024)
- Vicky Vidya Ka Woh Wala Video (2024)
- Phullwanti (Marathi) (2024)
- Like Aani Subscribe (Marathi) (2024)
- Hardik Shubhechha (Marathi) (2025)
- SuSheela SuJeet (Marathi) (2025)
- All The Best Pandya (Gujarati) (2025)
- Mithada Maheman (Gujarati) (2025)
- Banjara (Marathi) (2025)
- Jarann (Marathi) (2025)
- Maharani (Gujarati) (2025)
- Asha (Marathi) (2025)
- Paatki (Gujarati) (2026)
- Shatak: Sangh Ke 100 Varsh (2026)
- Assi (2026)
- Kissa Court Kachehari Ka (2026)
- Vaanki Chuki Love Story (Gujarati) (2026)
- Daadi Ki Shaadi (2026)
- Drishyam 3 (Malayalam) (2026)
- Baby Do Die Do (2026)
- Swapnasundari (Marathi) (2026)
- Hanuman Ansh (2026)
- Toxic (Kannada) (2026)
- Mahaprabhu Jagannath (2026)
- Arrjantinaa (Punjabi) (2026)
- Baththa (Tamil) (2026)
- Thaapi (Punjabi) (2026)
- Kapuskonda (Marathi) (2026)
- Ranjheya (Punjabi) (2027)
