= Firoz Irani =

Indian actor

- Occupations: Actor, producer, writer, director
- Years active: 1970–present
- Children: Abhishek Irani
- Relatives: 3 sisters & 4 brothers including Indra Kumar (Brother); Aruna Irani (Sister); Adi Irani (Brother); Kuku Kohli (Brother-in-law); Bindu (Cousin); Shweta Kumar (niece)

Firoz Irani is an Indian actor, producer, director and writer, mainly working in Hindi entertainment and Gujarati cinema.

== Selected filmography ==
As actor

- 2022 Adko Dadko
- 2018 GujjuBhai - Most Wanted (cameo)
- 2015 Saako 363, Amrita Ki Khejadi (as Deewan Girdhar Das Bhandari)
- 2014 Kon Halave Limdi Ne Kon Zulave Pipli (as Anna)
- 2013 Patan Thi Pakistan
- 2011 Preet Jhuke Nahi Saath Chhute Nahi (as Himmatsinh)
- 2010 Musaa: The Most Wanted (as Bhai) (as Fairouz Irani)
- 2008 Yaar Meri Zindagi
- 2006 Pyare Mohan (as

Fairouz Irani)

- 2006 Ek Var Piyu Ne Malva Aavje
- 2004 Aitraaz
- 2003 Main Hoon Daku Rani
- 2002 Humraaz (Guest appearance)
- 2001 Maiyar Ma Mandu Nathi Lagtu
- 1995 Aatank Hi Aatank (as Fairouz Irani)
- 1995 Paapi Farishte
- 1995 Police Lock-up
- 1994 Jai Maa Karwa Chauth
- 1994 Rakhwale
- 1993 Phoolan Hasina Ramkali (as Fairouz Irani)
- 1993 Rani Aur Maharani
- 1992 Ganga Bani Shola
- 1992 Angaar
- 1992 Dushman Zamana
- 1990 Naag Nagin (as Ringo)
- 1990 Tejaa
- 1990 Zakhmi Zameen
- 1990 Shetal Tara Unda Pani
- 1989 Mahisagarne Aare
- 1989 Sindoor Aur Bandook (as Police Commissioner)
- 1989 Lashkar
- 1988 Zulm Ko Jala Doonga (as Thakur)
- 1987 Moti Verana Chawk Ma
- 1986 Badkaar
- 1986 Chambal Ka Badshah (as Fairouz Irani)
- 1985 Mahasati Tulsi (as Bhagwan Shri Bholeynath)
- 1985 Atma Vishwas
- 1985 Meru Malan
- 1984 Hiran Ne Kanthe
- 1983 Marad No Mandvo
- 1983 Dodh Dhaaya
- 1983 Lohi Nu Tilak
- 1982 Dholi
- 1982 Apne Paraye
- 1982 Charotar Ni Champa
- 1982 Jugal Jodi
- 1981 Albeli Naar
- 1981 Chhel Chabili Sonal
- 1981 Rano Kunwar
- 1977 Chandu Jamadar
- 1977 Do Chehere
- 1976 Malavpati Munj
- 1970 Jigar Ane Ami (as Younger brother of Jigar)
- 2022 Pran Chhute Pan Mari Preet Na Tute (Gujarati film)
- 2024 Kasoombo (Gujarati film)
- 2025 Taaro Thayo, Ilu Ilu, All The Best Pandya, Sanghavi and Sons (Gujarati film)
- 2026 Ruff and Tuff Kanya

Director

- Hote Hote Pyar Ho Gaya (1999) (as Fairouz Irani)

Writer

- Hote Hote Pyar Ho Gaya (1999) (additional screenplay) (as Fairouz Irani)

Producer

- Hote Hote Pyar Ho Gaya (1999) (executive producer) (as Fairouz Irani)

Other

- Anokhi Ada (1973) (production assistant) (as Fairouz Irani)

== Television ==
- Burey Bhi Hum Bhale Bhi Hum as Ambalal Popat (2009)
- Baa Bahoo Aur Baby as Baba Bakshi (2009)
- Moti Ba Ni Nani Vahu as Mr Zaveri (2021–present) on Colors Gujrati
- Aafat (1994)
