= Kamlesh Oza =

Notable Indian television actor

- Born: India
- Occupation: Actor

Kamlesh Oza is an Indian television actor. He is notable for playing the role of Hemal Thakkar in Hats Off Productions' Baa Bahoo Aur Baby which is aired on STAR Plus, Bhavesh Kumar in Instant Khichdi.

Bansuriwala in crime patrol satrak

Hindi movies: Ghulam....Ghaath...dil to badha hai jee. Dil mange more.....Break k baad ...Loins of Punjab

== Career ==
Oza is also a veteran of the Gujarati stage and has acted in number of Gujarati plays since 1986. He has adapted, directed, acted in and produced the play, 2 Idiots and Thappo and working with Umesh Shukla on his play, Ek Room Rasodu (English: One Room Kitchen). He became very popular in the Indian households after playing the role of "Bansuriwala" (flute man) in an episode of Crime Patrol.

== Works ==
Year	Series	Role	Notes
1996–99	Hasratein	Chetan	Zee TV
1998	Ghulam	Avinash	Hindi film
1998–2000	X Zone		Episode No.99
2000	Ghaath		Hindi film
2002–06	Khichdi	Bhavesh Kumar	STAR Plus
2004–05	Malini Iyer	Bobby Sabarwal	Sahara One
2004	Dil Maange More		Hindi film
2005	Instant Khichdi	Bhavesh Kumar	Sequel of Khichdi
2005–10	Baa Bahoo Aur Baby	Hemal Thakkar	
2010	Break Ke Baad	Rishabh	
2011	Dil Toh Baccha Hai Ji		Hindi film
2011	The Lion of Punjab		Punjabi film
2011	Mrs. Tendulkar	Gangaram Godbole	
2010s	Crime Patrol		Episodic role
2010s	Savdhaan India		Episodic role
2024	Maharaj	Shaamji	Hindi film; Netflix
