= Viral Shah (director) =

Indian filmmaker

- Born: 28 August 1986
- Occupations: Film director, screenwriter, voice actor
- Known for: Midnights with Menka (2018); Golkeri (2020); Kutch Express (2023)
- Spouse: Pooja Thakar (m. 2022)

Viral Shah is an Indian filmmaker and screenwriter who primarily works in Gujarati cinema. He in known for directing films including Midnights with Menka (2018), Golkeri (2020), Kutch Express (2023), and Gulaam Chor (2023).

== Life and career ==
Shah was born on 28 August 1986 in Mumbai. He studied media studies at Usha Pravin Gandhi College of Management, Mumbai.

He started his career as a director with Midnights with Menka in 2018. He directed Golkeri in 2020. His next film Kutch Express was announced in 2022, and was released in 2023, starring Ratna Pathak Shah, Manasi Parekh, Dharmendra Gohil, Darsheel Safary, and Viraf Patel.

Shah married Pooja Thakar in November 2022.

== Filmography ==
As a director

Films
Year	Title
2018	Midnights with Menka
2020	Golkeri
2020	Haba Goba (short film)
2023	Kutch Express
2023	Gulaam Chor
2025	Maharani

As voice actor

Year	Title	Role	Language	Notes
2019-2021	Golmaal Junior	Gopal	Hindi	Animated series
2024	Golmaal Jr: Humshakals Ka Golmaal	Gopal	Hindi	Animated film

== Dubbing ==
Year	Title	Original actor	Role	Dub Language	Notes	Ref.
2017	Spider-Man: Homecoming	Tony Revolori	Eugene "Flash" Thompson	Hindi		
2017-2019	Trollhunters: Tales of Arcadia	Anton Yelchin; Emile Hirsch	Jim Lake Jr.	Hindi	Animated series	
2019	3Below: Tales of Arcadia	Emile Hirsch	Jim Lake Jr.	Hindi	Animated series	
2019	Spider-Man: Far From Home	Tony Revolori	Eugene "Flash" Thompson	Hindi		
2020	Wizards: Tales of Arcadia	Emile Hirsch	Jim Lake Jr.	Hindi	Animated series	
2021	Trollhunters: Rise of the Titans	Emile Hirsch	Jim Lake Jr.	Hindi	Animated film	
2021	Spider-Man: No Way Home	Tony Revolori	Eugene "Flash" Thompson	Hindi		
2025	Heads of State	Jack Quaid	Marty Comer	Hindi		

== Awards ==
Shah's film Golkeri received the Film Excellence Awards Gujarati and GIFA-Gujarati Iconic Film Award in Best Film category.

== See also ==
- List of Gujarati films
- List of Indian film directors
- List of Indian dubbing artists
