= Viraf Patel =

Indian model and television actor (born 1980)

Viraf Phiroz Patel
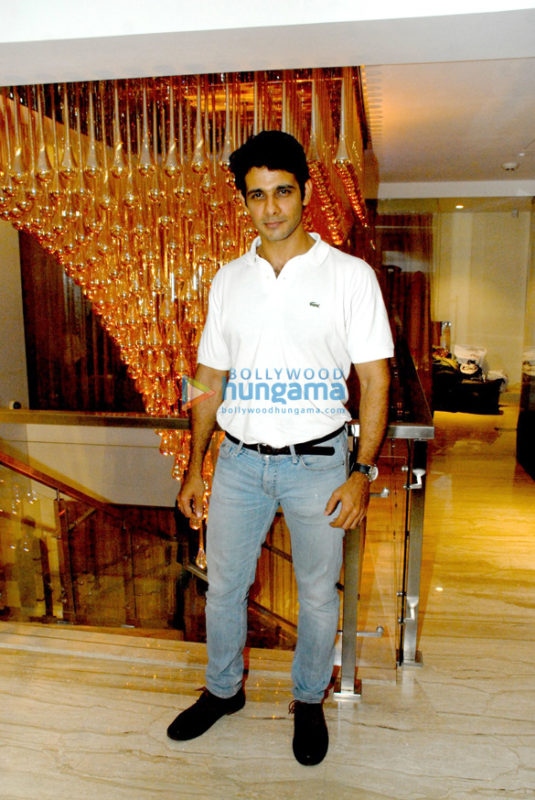
- Born: 12 June 1980 (age 46); Pune, Maharashtra, India
- Occupations: Actor; model; screenwriter
- Years active: 2005–present
- Spouse: Saloni Khanna (m. 2021)

Viraf Phiroz Patel (born 12 June 1980) is an Indian actor, model and screenwriter. He was a sailor in the merchant navy between 1999 and 2004 and was titled as the Grasim Mr. India 2005. He is best known for his roles in Mahi Way, Kismat, Teri Meri Love Stories and Ek Boond Ishq. He made his debut in Theatre with Vikram Kapadia's Bombay Talkies in 2012.

== Personal life ==
Viraf got engaged to his long-time girlfriend Saloni Khanna on 20 February 2021. The couple got married on 6 May 2021.

== Career ==
After completing five years of sailing in the Merchant Navy, Patel participated in the Grasim Mister India Contest in 2005, which he won. He would go on to pursue a modelling career where he would feature in various shows and TV commercials. He most notably modeled for Limca in 2010.

Patel was the face of India's largest garment retail brand Pantaloon from 2005 to 2009. Prior to his acting career, he modeled for many designers and was seen modelling at the India Fashion Week and Lakme Fashion Week.

In 2010, he made his acting debut in the mini-series Mahi Way. The following year he acted in another TV series Kismat where he played the lead character of Aditya Raj Merchant. Patel portrayed the role of a businessman in the BBC telefilm Tere Meri Love Stories where he starred alongside Shilpa Anand. He also acted in the drama, Ek Boondh Ishq, a BBC worldwide production and his first daily soap. The show stopped airing in October 2014.

From 2016-2017, Patel featured in Mahesh Bhatt's Naamkaran as Ashish Mehta, which aired on StarPlus. In addition to acting, he is also pursuing screenwriting under actor Boman Irani.

Patel had also directed and produced a documentary based on the daughters of sex workers. He made his web-series debut with 13 Mussoorie which aired on Viu.

== Television ==
Year	Show	Role	Channel
2010	Mahi Way	Shiv Deshraj	Sony Entertainment Television (India)
2010	Rishta.com	Arjun Khanna(cameo)	Sony Entertainment Television (India)
2011	Kismat	Aditya Raj Merchant	Sony Entertainment Television (India)
2012	Teri Meri Love Stories	Shreshth Kashyap	Star Plus
2013–2014	Ek Boond Ishq	Mrityunjay Singh Shekhawat	Life OK
2015	Hunnarbaaz Season 2	Host	DD National
2016-2017	Naamkarann	Ashish Mehta	Star Plus
2017	MTV Big F S2E06	Samrat S.	MTV
2018	Showbiz with Vahbiz E09	Guest	Indian WikiMedia
2018	13 Mussoorie	Rishi Pant	Viu
2018	Laal Ishq E38	Amar	&TV
2019	Flip E03 - Massage	Navzar	Eros Now
2019	Heartbreak Hotel E01 - "Phenomenal"	Vikram	Sony Liv
2019	The Verdict - State vs Nanavati	Prem Bhagwandas Ahuja	ALTBalaji and ZEE5
2020	Taish	Shozi	ZEE5
2026	Made In India: A Titan Story	Murli Shankar Dalmia	Amazon MX Player

== Filmography ==
Year	Movie	Role	Language	Notes
2011	Mummy Punjabi	Arjun Arora	Hindi	Debut film
2017	Hanuman: Da' Damdaar	Vishnu	Hindi	Voice role
2021	Koi Jaane Na	Vicky Singhania	Hindi	
2023	Pathaan	Rishi Arya	Hindi	
2023	Kutch Express	Madan	Gujarati	
2024	Maharaj	Sorabji	Hindi	
2024	Doctors	Dr. Abhijat Gupta	Hindi	
2025	Shubhchintak	Sanjay	Gujarati	

== Advertisements ==
Year	Brand	Director
2006	Planet Sports	Sameer Puri
2006	onegramoflatex	Vishal Suchak
2006	TVS Apache	Marco Kalantri.
2006	Maruti Alto	Amit Sharma
2006	Sony Handycam	Prahlad Kakkar
2008	Sony Bravia	N/A
2009	V-Guard pump	
2009	ICICI Mutual Funds	Amit Sharma
2010	Limca	Vinil Matthew
2011	Chik Shampoo	Pradeep Sarkar
2011	Bank Of India, Home Loans	Shivendra Singh
2013	Vento Volkswagen	Shivendra Singh
2015	Indica Easy Hair Colour	Ice Media Lawrance
2015	Mine Diamonds	Bhanuprakash A V
2016	TVS Victor	Abhijit Chaudhuri
2016	Britannia Nutrichoice Oat Cookies	Kamlesh Pandey
2016	Wild Stone Deo	Vivek Kakkad
2016	Grand Mills Chakki Fresh Atta	Aatish Dabral
2017	Coolpad Note 5	Robbie Grewal
2017	Wheel 2 in 1	Hemant Bhandari
2017	Saffola Masala Oats	
2018	NetMeds.com	Aatish Dabral
2018	Sufi Banaspati and Cooking Oil	Shwetabh Varma
2018	Philips Ceiling Secure Downlight	
