= Laalo – Krishna Sada Sahaayate =

2025 Indian Gujarati devotional drama film

- Official Poster
- Directed by: Ankit Sakhiya
- Written by: Krushansh Vaja; Vicky Poornima; Ankit Sakhiya
- Produced by: Manifest Films; Jay Vyas Productions; Ajay Balavant Padariya; Shubham Hitesh Gajjar; Jay Vyas; Parthivkumar Vallabhbhai Jodhani; Devang Prafulbhai Mehta; Arjun Ratilal Vaghasiya; Ravi Jagdishbhai Pithadia; Jigar Haribhai Dalsaniya
- Starring: Reeva Rachh; Shruhad Goswami; Karan Joshi; Mishty Kadecha
- Cinematography: Shubham Gajjar
- Edited by: Krushansh Vaja; Ankit Sakhiya
- Music by: Smmit Jay
- Production companies: Manifest Films; R.D Brothers Movies; Soul Sutra; Neem Tree Entertainment
- Distributed by: Rupam Entertainment Pvt Ltd
- Release date: October 10, 2025
- Running time: 135 minutes
- Country: India
- Language: Gujarati
- Budget: ₹50 lakh
- Box office: est. ₹120 crore

Laalo – Krishna Sada Sahaayate is a 2025 Indian Gujarati language devotional drama film directed by Ankit Sakhiya and written by Krushansh Vaja, Vicky Poornima and Ankit Sakhiya. It stars Reeva Rachh, Shruhad Goswami, Karan Joshi, Mishty Kadecha and others. The film is produced by Manifest Films, Jay Vyas Productions, Ajay Balavant Padariya, Shubham Hitesh Gajjar, Jay Vyas, Parthivkumar Vallabhbhai Jodhani, Devang Prafulbhai Mehta, Arjun Ratilal Vaghasiya, Ravi Jagdishbhai Pithadia, & Jigar Haribhai Dalsaniya. The film is co-produced by R.D Brothers Movies, Soul Sutra, Neem Tree Entertainment and Devraj Dubariya. It was released on 10 October 2025, and subsequently in a Hindi dubbed version on 9 January 2026.

The film struggled at the box office at its release; however, strong word-of-mouth resulted in an uptick in audience from the third week. It was declared a sleeper hit and went on to become the highest grossing Gujarati film of all time as well as the first Gujarati film to gross over ₹120 crore (US$12 million) worldwide.

== Plot ==
A rickshaw driver trapped in a Farmhouse confronts his past demons while experiencing visions of Lord Krishna, who guides him through a transformative journey of self-discovery and healing.

== Cast ==
- Reeva Rachh as Tulsi
- Shruhad Goswami as Laalo/Lord Krishna
- Karan Joshi as Lalji Dhansukh Parmar "Laalo"
- Mishty Kadecha as Khushi, Laalo & Tulsi's daughter
- Anshu Joshi as Dhansukh Parmar, Lalji's father
- Kinnal Nayak as Tulsi's mother
- Parul Rajyaguru
- Jaydeep Timaniya as Rasik

== Soundtrack ==
Laalo: Shree Krishna Sada Sahaayate

Studio album by Smmit Jay
- Released: 2025
- Genre: Feature film soundtrack
- Length: 31:01
- Language: Gujarati
- Label: Gujarati Jalso
External audio
- Laalo: Shree Krishna Sada Sahaayate Full Album on JioSaavn

=== Tracklist ===
All lyrics are written by Prem D Dave, Traditional; all music is composed by Smmit Jay

No.	Title	Lyrics	Music	Singer(s)	Length
1.	"Mann Mohan"	Prem D Dave	Smmit Jay	Krishna Beuraa	7:19
2.	"Manorath Jeev"	Prem D Dave	Smmit Jay	Kirtidan Gadhvi	4:17
3.	"Maade Mane Lai Ja"	Prem D Dave	Smmit Jay	Yashita Sharma, Ashish Kulkarni, Kirtidan Gadhvi	5:16
4.	"Krishna Theme"	Traditional	Smmit Jay	Divya Kumar	2:55
5.	"Kaan Tari Re"	Prem D Dave	Smmit Jay	Aishwarya Majmudar, Kirtidan Gadhvi	4:58
6.	"Navee Savaar"	Prem D Dave	Smmit Jay	Parthiv Gohil	2:38
7.	"Dwarika No Naath"	Traditional	Traditional, recreated by Smmit Jay	Jaysinh Gadhavi	3:38
Total length:					31:01

== Production ==
The film was primarily shot in and around Junagadh, with key sequences filmed at notable local sites including Bhavnath, Girnar, Damodar Kund, and Narsinh Mehta no Choro, locations closely associated with Gujarat's spiritual and cultural heritage.

== Marketing and release ==
On 29 September 2025, the official trailer of Laalo: Shree Krishna Sada Sahaayate was released on social media and YouTube platforms. The film was released theatrically on 10 October 2025. Its distribution gained further visibility when it became part of a significant industry development – multiplex chains such as PVR INOX, Cinepolis, and Star Studio18 reportedly granted Laalo a VPF (Virtual Print Fee) waiver, an arrangement described as uncommon for Gujarati regional films. It became the first Gujarati film to release in Poland.

The film was dubbed into Hindi. The official Hindi language poster was released on social media on 22 December 2025, followed by the release of the Hindi language teaser on 23 December 2025 across social media and YouTube. The Hindi language trailer was subsequently released on 29 December 2025. The film released in Hindi on 9 January 2026.

== Reception ==
=== Box office ===
Trade reports cited by Bollywood Hungama described Laalo as a “miraculous Gujarati hit,” noting that its box office performance led to the VPF waiver – an honour typically reserved for major Hindi or international films. This was seen as a reflection of the film's growing success and theatre owners' confidence in its audience appeal.

Aaj Tak reported that Laalo achieved strong ticket sales, surpassing the collections of some mainstream Hindi releases in Gujarat. The report attributed the film's steady performance to positive word of mouth and its devotional storytelling.

As the film progressed into its later weeks, it continued to record substantial growth at the box office. Reports indicated that it entered its fifth weekend with strong momentum and surpassed the cumulative earnings of its first four weeks within that single weekend. Box-office tracking further noted that the film went on to exceed the lifetime collections of Chaal Jeevi Laiye, becoming the highest-grossing Gujarati film in India. By Day 38 of its theatrical run, the film had an estimated net total of ₹52.75 crore (US$5.5 million), with daily collections reported at approximately ₹6.5 crore (US$670,000) following ₹4.5 crore (US$470,000) the previous day.

By the 51st day of its release, it became the first Gujarati film to gross over ₹100 crore (US$10 million) worldwide.

The film's week-by-week performance – particularly the sharp increase beginning in the fourth week was noted as an unusual box-office pattern for Gujarati cinema. Its sustained earnings were cited as an indication of the expanding commercial potential of regional films, supported by positive word of mouth and continued audience interest in devotional-themed storytelling.

== Accolades ==
In May 2026, the film became the first Gujarati film to be screened at Cannes Film Festival.

== See also ==
- Gujarati cinema
- List of Gujarati films of 2025
- List of highest-grossing Gujarati films
- Sleeper hit
- 100 Crore Club
