= Manasi Parekh =

Indian actress

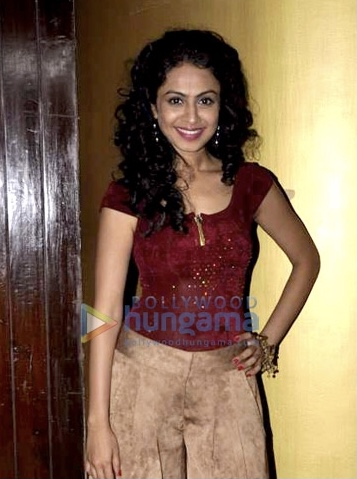
- Parekh in 2013.
- Born: July 10, 1986 (age 40); Mumbai
- Education: B. A. in English Literature
- Occupations: Actress, model and singer
- Years active: 2004 - present
- Known for: Gulaal, Sumit Sambhal Lega
- Spouse: Parthiv Gohil (m. 2008)
- Children: 1
- Relatives: Mahesh Parekh (father), Manisha Parekh (mother)

Manasi Parekh is an Indian actress, singer, producer and content creator. She is known for her roles as Gulaal in Star Plus's Zindagi Ka Har Rang...Gulaal and Maya in Sumit Sambhal Lega. She won the National Film Award for Best Actress in 2024 for her portrayal of Monghi in the film Kutch Express.

== Personal life ==
Manasi Parekh is a Gujarati who was born and brought up in Mumbai. Despite being born in Mumbai, she has a strong cultural connection to Gujarat and frequently visits the state. She grew up with a fondness for music and is a fan of Purshottam Upadhyaya. She is married to musician Parthiv Gohil, and they have a daughter.

== Career ==
Mansi was inclined towards music and acting since her school days. She actively participated in school events and was a part of Channel V's pop star (Season 2) in 2003, where she was one of the 8 finalists alongside Ayushman Khurrana. She made her acting debut in the serial Kitni Mast Hai Zindagi in 2004, but gained popularity through Star One's India Calling in 2005. She won Zee TV's singing reality show Star Ya Rockstar. Manasi also appeared in Star Plus' prime-time show Gulaal, and was also seen in shows like 9X's Remote Control and Star One's Laughter Ke Phatke. In April 2012, she appeared in the Tamil romance film Leelai alongside Bollywood actor Shiv Panditt. Manasi made her Hindi debut with Yeh Kaisi Life, which premiered at the IFFI Festival in Goa.

In 2019, she made her debut as a producer with the Gujarati web series Do Not Disturb. In 2020, she made her debut in Gujarati cinema with Golkeri which was commercially successful. At the 70th National Film Awards, she won the National Film Award for Best Actress in 2024 for her portrayal of Monghi in the film Kutch Express, becoming the first Gujarati actress to receive this honor. Her next horror comedy film Jhamkudi (2024) was a commercial success.

== Television ==
Year	Show	Role	Notes	Ref(s)
2004—2005	Kitni Mast Hai Zindagi	Rashmi		
2005	Kaisa Ye Pyar Hai	Tanya	Guest appearance	
2005—2006	India Calling	Chandini		
2005	Kasautii Zindagii Kay	Kuki Bajaj		
2006	Kkavyanjali	Akshara		
2007	Aahat	Millie	Special appearance, Episode 2	
2007	Four	Taranpreet		
2008	Remote Control	Bubbly		
2009	Saat Phere: Saloni Ka Safar	Kavita		
2010	Sapna Babul Ka...Bidaai	Guest (as Gulaal)	Special appearance	
2010	Saath Nibhaana Saathiya			
2010—2011	Zindagi Ka Har Rang...Gulaal	Gulaal		
2010	Jhalak Dikhhla Jaa 4	Guest	Dance performance in finale	
2011	Yeh Rishta Kya Kehlata Hai	Guest (as Gulaal)	Special appearance	
2011	Mann Kee Awaaz Pratigya	Guest (as Gulaal)	Special appearance	
2011	Sasural Genda Phool	Guest (as Gulaal)	Special appearance	
2011	Iss Pyaar Ko Kya Naam Doon?	Guest (as Gulaal)	Special appearance	
2011	Kuch Toh Log Kahenge	Mandira	Guest Appearance	
2011	Star Ya Rockstar	Contestant	Winner	
2012	Ek Hazaaron Mein Meri Behna Hai	Mahhi	Cameo role	
2013	Saraswatichandra	Karuna		
2014	Ishq Kills	Contract killer		
2015	Yeh Hai Mohabbatein	Guest (as Maya)	Special appearance to promote Sumit Sambhal Lega	
2015—2016	Sumit Sambhal Lega	Maya	Sumit's wife	
2016–2017	Kasam Tere Pyaar Ki	Kritika	Cameo role	
2017	Gangaa	Guest	Special appearance	
2017	Bigg Boss 11	Guest	To support Hiten Tejwani	
2019	Kitchen Champion 5	Guest	Contestant Along with Juhi Parmar	
2026	Chumbak	Priyanka Khanna	Netflix series	

== Films ==
Key
†	Denotes films that have not yet been released

Year	Title	Role	Language	Notes	Ref.
2007	Laaga Chunari Mein Daag	Konkana's Colleague	Hindi		
2012	Leelai	Karunai Malar	Tamil		
2019	Uri: The Surgical Strike	Neha Kashyap	Hindi		
2020	Golkeri	Harshita	Gujarati	Also producer	
2022	Dear Father	Alka	Gujarati		
2023	Kutch Express	Monghi	Gujarati	Also producer	
2023	Congratulations	Ragini	Gujarati		
2024	Ittaa Kittaa	Kavya	Gujarati		
2024	Jhamkudi	Kumud	Gujarati	Also producer	
2025	Shubhchintak	Meghana	Gujarati	Also producer	
2025	Maharani	Manasi	Gujarati		
2025	Laalo – Krishna Sada Sahaayate		Gujarati	Producer	
2025	Misri	Pooja	Gujarati		
2026	Jab Khuli Kitaab	Asha	Hindi		
2026	Mitrata		Gujarati	Producer	

=== Short films ===
Year	Title	Role	Ref.
2019	Laddoo	Mo	

=== Web series ===
Year	Title	Channel	Role	Notes	Platform
2017	Bin Bulaaye Mehman	Shitty Ideas Trending	Jahnvi	Supporting	YouTube
2017	The Right Time	Shitty Ideas Trending	Shreya	Lead	YouTube
2017	Truth or Dare	TVF's Girlyapa	Sonu	Lead	YouTube
2018	Supermoms With Manasi	Manasi Parekh FB Page	Host	Chat Show	Facebook
2018	Do Not Disturb	MX Player Originals	Meera	Drama	MX Player

== Theatre ==
Year	Title	Role	Notes	Location
2012-2014	Maro Piyu Gayo Rangoon	Heli	Lead	Globe to Globe Festival, London

== Home production ==
Year	Title	Role	Format
2017	Tum Bhi Na	Singer, Artist	Music Video

== Awards ==
Year	Film	Award	Category	Ref.
2024	Kutch Express	National Film Awards	Best Actress	
