= Jatin Sapru =

Indian TV sports journalist

- Born: Jatin Sapru; 8 April 1986 (age 40)
- Occupation: Sports Presenter
- Years active: 9
- Known for: Cricket Commentary
- Spouse: Lara Sinha
- Children: 1

Jatin Sapru is an Indian sports broadcaster-television host and cricket commentator who works for Star Sports network.

He also has a YouTube channel, 'Jatin Sapru', where he uploads vlogs and cricket content.

== Early life ==
Sapru was born in a Kashmiri Pandit family. His grandfather was a Vice Principal in Kashmir University and father was an engineer. In 1990, his family along with other Hindu families in the region had to flee from Kashmir Valley to Delhi as a result of being targeted by JKLF and Islamist insurgents during late 1989 and early 1990, the event which is infamously known as the Exodus of Kashmiri Hindus.
