= Abhishek Shah =

Indian film director and producer (born 1982)

- Born: 29 November 1982 (age 43); Ahmedabad, Gujarat, India
- Education: Gujarat University
- Occupations: Director screenwriter producer writer
- Years active: 2014–present
- Spouse: Tejal Panchasara (m. 2007)

Abhishek Shah (born 29 November 1982) is an Indian filmmaker, writer, director and producer known from his work in Gujarati films and theatre. His movies and plays revolve around significant social issues.

== Career ==
He started working as a casting director in Gujarati cinema. In 2019, he made his directorial debut with the Gujarati film Hellaro, which he co-produced under his banner Harfanmaula Films in association with Saarthi Productions.

In 2025, he directed Umbarro, a comedy drama following seven women from rural Gujarat on their first trip to London.

His third feature, Dhabkaaro (2026), which he also wrote, stars Deven Bhojani and Aarjav Trivedi, with Kumud Mishra and Tejal Panchasara in supporting roles. It was produced by Nadiadwala Grandson Entertainment in association with The Moving Manch and Harfanmaula Films, marking Nadiadwala Grandson Entertainment's first Gujarati-language production. The film was released on 1 May 2026, coinciding with Gujarat Foundation Day.

== Awards and nominations ==
Abhishek Shah's Debutant film, Hellaro won the National Film Award for Best Feature Film at the 66th National Film Awards. It was officially selected as the opening film at Indian Panorama at the 50th International Film Festival of India (IFFI). The film was nominated for the 'Best Debut Award' at the Mahatma Gandhi Afro Asian Film Award for the year 2020. He was nominated for the Best Director Award at the Gujarat State Film Awards 2019 and the Best Writer Award at the Critics Choice Film Awards for the year 2019.

== Filmography ==
=== As a director ===
- Hellaro (2019)
- Umbarro (2025)
- Dhabkaaro (2026)
