= Kaajal Oza Vaidya =

Indian author and radio personality (born 1966)

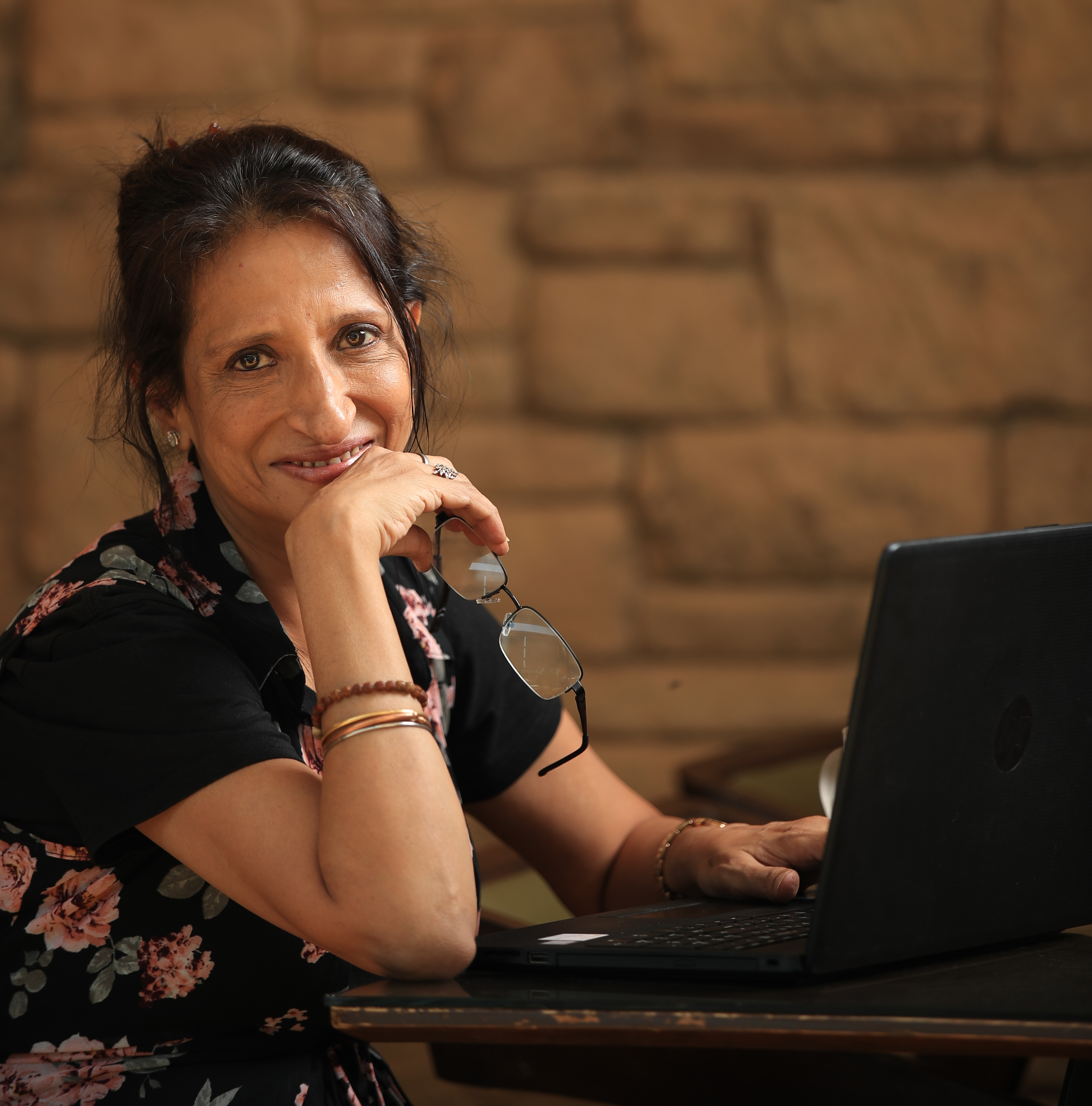
- Kaajal Oza Vaidya
- Born: 29 September 1966 (age 60); Mumbai, India
- Citizenship: Indian
- Occupations: author, screenwriter
- Spouse: Sanjay Vaidya
- Children: son: Tathaagat
- Writing career
- Language: Gujarati
- Years active: 2005-
- Website: kaajalozavaidya.in

Kaajal Oza Vaidya is an author, screenwriter, radio personality and journalist from Ahmedabad, India. She initially worked as a journalist and actress. She has written more than 56 books including novels, short stories and essays. She has written stories, dialogues and scripts of soap operas and films. She writes columns in several publications and hosts a radio show.

== Early life and education ==
Kaajal was born on 29 September 1966 in Mumbai, India. She graduated with a degree in English and Sanskrit from Gujarat University in 1986. She completed her post-graduate certificate in advertising management from Saint Xavier's College in Mumbai.

== Career ==
She debuted in writing with a short story collection, Sambandh.. To Akash in 2005 was followed by a collection of poetry, Sheshyatra. Her popularity grew when her first novel Yog Viyog was serialized in Chitralekha weekly. She worked on plays during her earlier career. She teaches creative writing as a Visiting Faculty in the Master of Developmental Communication Department of Gujarat University.

She worked as a journalist with Sandesh, Gujarat Daily, Loksatta-Jansatta, The Indian Express, Abhiyan magazine and Samkalin, Sambhaav. She writes columns in Divya Bhaskar, Gujarat Mitra, Kutchmitra, Janmabhhomi Pravasi and Culcutta Halchal. She regularly gives speeches on different subjects across Gujarat and beyond. She hosts the radio show Kaajal@9 on 94.3 My FM Ahmedabad.

== Works ==
=== Literary works ===
Kaajal has written more than 86 books.

She published several novels: Yog Viyog (Part 1 – 2 - 3, 2007), Krishnayan (2010), Sannata Nu Sarnamu (2011), Purna Apurna, Chahera PAchhalno Chahero (2013), Purvardh (2014), Symphony of Silence (2014), Rag Vairag (2018), Draupadi, Shukra – Mangal, Satya – Asatya, Dariyo Ek Taras No, Lilu Sagpan Lohi Nu, Pot Potani Pankhar (Part 1 & 2), Tara Vina na Shaher Ma, Ek Saanj Na Sarname, Parijat Nu Parodh, Chhal (Part 1 -2), Maun Raag, Madhyabindu. Sheshyatra is her poetry collection. Her short story collections are Heartbreak Pachhini Savar, Kaajal Oza Vaidya Ni Vartao, Sambandh.. To Aakash.

She published several collections of essays and articles: Mari Mummy Mara Pappa.., Sangath Ekbijano, Marji Ekbijani, Shradhdhha Ekbijani, Satya Ekbijanu, Sukh Ekbijanu, Samjan Ek Bijani, Saath Ek Bijano, Sneh Ek Bijano, Mausam Ek Bijani, I Love You, Ek Bijane Gamta Rahiye (2009), Get Well Soon, Man — Minus Thi Plus, Searchlight, Tujse Hoti Bhi To, Kya Hoti Shikayat Mujhko?. Her books published in letter format include Tane, Jindagi...; Vhali Astha (2008); Priya Naman.

Guru Brahma, Doctor, Tame Pan!, Chung Ching, Savka, Perfect Husband, Silver Jubilee and Vaat Ek Raat Ni are her plays. She edited coffee table books; Smit (Smile), Aansu (Tear), Prarthna (Prayer), Chumban (Kiss) and Prem (Love). Her audio books include Tran Pedhi Ni Kavita, Prempatro, Tara Chaherani Lagolag. She translated Gary Chapman's The Five Love Languages as Premni Panch Bhasha and Shobha De's Spouse as Jeevansathi in Gujarati.

=== Screen works ===
She wrote story, script and dialogues of several productions. She wrote some plays for Hum Production. She wrote story, screenplay and dialogues of three Gujarati telefilms; Antarna Ujas, Sukhno Arth, Hu Ja Bhagyavidhata.

She wrote story for several TV soap operas. Her Ek Daalna Pankhi (2001) which was aired on DD Girnar, and completed 1600 episodes while Moti Ba aired on ETV Gujarati completed 500 episodes. Her other weekly soaps in Gujarati were Saat Taali, Ek Moti Eklavyanu. In Hindi, she wrote story of Apne Paraye aired on B4U and Mahasati Savitri aired on SAB TV. She wrote the screenplay of Gujarati films like Dikri To Parki Thapan Kehvay and Saptapadii (2013); and Hindi films like Ghat and Diwanagi.

Her novel Yog Viyog was being adapted as TV series Vasundhara starring Jaya Bachchan but production was delayed later.

She acted in the 2024 Gujarati horror comedy film Karkhanu. In 2025, she acted in Gujarati family drama film Taaro Thayo.

== Personal life ==
She lives in Ahmedabad. She is a daughter of Digant Oza and is married to photographer Sanjay Vaidya since 22 June 1993. They have a son, Tathaagat.

== Recognition ==
She was recognized on International Women's Day in 2015.

== See also ==
- List of Gujarati-language writers
