= Vaishal Shah =

Indian Film Producer

- Born: Vaishal Shah; 10 November 1984 (age 41); Ahmedabad
- Occupations: Film maker; film producer
- Years active: 2015–present
- Organization: Jannock Films LLP
- Known for: Chhello Divas (2015); Karsandas Pay & Use (2017); Shu Thayu? (2018); Chehre (2021); Fakt Mahilao Maate (2022); 3 Ekka (2023); Fakt Purusho Maate (2024)
- Parent(s): Rajeshbhai Jamnadas Shah - Father & Hema Rajeshbhai Shah - Mother
- Website: https://jannockfilms.com/

Vaishal Shah is an Indian film producer known for his work in Gujarati, Marathi, and Hindi cinema. He has produced several commercially successful films including Chhello Divas (2015), Karsandas Pay & Use (2017), Shu Thayu? (2018), Fakt Mahilao Maate (2022), 3 Ekka (2023), Fakt Purusho Maate (2024) and Chaniya Toli (2025).

As a filmmaker, Shah focuses on producing films that entertain audiences while conveying social messages. He was the first producer to bring together actors Malhar Thakar, Yash Soni and Mitra Gadhavi in Chhello Divas (2015), followed by their collaborations in Shu Thayu? (2018) and 3 Ekka (2023). Both Shu Thayu? and 3 Ekka rank among the top 10 highest-grossing Gujarati films of all time.

In 2021, Shah collaborated with producer Anand Pandit as co-producer of the Hindi film Chehre, starring Amitabh Bachchan and Emraan Hashmi. The duo later produced Gujarati films including Fakt Mahilao Maate (2022), Fakt Purusho Maate (2024), Chaniya Toli (2025), Asambhauuu (2026).

== Filmography ==
Year	Film	Producer	Co-Producer	Language	Ref.
2026	Asambhauuu	Yes		Gujarati	
2025	Chaniya Toli	Yes		Gujarati	
2024	Fakt Purusho Maate	Yes		Gujarati	
2024	Musafiraa		Yes	Marathi	
2023	3 Ekka	Yes		Gujarati	
2023	Baap Manus		Yes	Marathi	
2022	Fakt Mahilao Maate	Yes		Gujarati	
2021	Chehre		Yes	Hindi	
2018	Shu Thayu?	Yes		Gujarati	
2018	Vandha Villas	Yes		Gujarati	
2017	Karsandas Pay & Use	Yes		Gujarati	
2016	Days of Tafree		Yes	Hindi	
2015	Chhello Divas	Yes		Gujarati	

== See also ==
- Gujarati cinema
- List of Gujarati films
- List of highest-grossing Gujarati films
- List of Indian film producers
