= 3 Ekka =

2023 Gujarati drama film

- Official Poster
- Directed by: Rajesh Sharma
- Written by: Chetan Daiya; Parth Trivedi
- Produced by: Anand Pandit; Vaishal Shah
- Starring: Malhar Thakar; Yash Soni; Mitra Gadhavi; Kinjal Rajpriya; Esha Kansara; Tarjanee Bhadla
- Cinematography: Pratik Parmar
- Edited by: Nirav Panchal
- Music by: Kedar and Bhargav
- Production companies: Anand Pandit Motion Pictures; Jannock Films
- Distributed by: Rupam Entertainment Pvt. Ltd.
- Release date: 25 August 2023
- Running time: 146 minutes
- Country: India
- Language: Gujarati
- Box office: est. ₹26.11 crore (US$2.7 million)

3 Ekka (Gujarati: ૩ એક્કા) is a 2023 Indian Gujarati-language drama film directed by Rajesh Sharma and written by Chetan Daiya and Parth Trivedi. It stars Malhar Thakar, Yash Soni, Mitra Gadhavi, Kinjal Rajpriya, Esha Kansara, and Tarjanee Bhadla in the lead roles. The film was released on 25 August 2023 and went on to become the second-highest grossing Gujarati film of all time, behind Chaal Jeevi Laiye!.

== Cast ==
- Malhar Thakar as Kalrav
- Yash Soni as Kabir
- Mitra Gadhavi as Bhargav
- Kinjal Rajpriya as Mansi
- Esha Kansara as Jhanvi
- Tarjanee Bhadla as Kavita
- Hitu Kanodia
- Chetan Daiya
- Prem Gadhavi
- Tusharika Rajguru
- Om Bhatt

== Production ==
On 20 November 2022, the film was announced, featuring the trio of Malhar Thakar, Yash Soni, and Mitra Gadhavi. They had previously worked together in the blockbuster Gujarati film Chhello Divas. The film is produced under the banner of Anand Pandit Motion Pictures, and Jannock Films. The music of the film was composed by Kedar and Bhargav.

=== Filming ===
The shooting of the film commenced on 13 February 2023 and wrapped up in nearly 50 Days. The entire film was shot in Ahmedabad.

== Soundtrack ==
3 Ekka

Soundtrack album by Kedar and Bhargav
- Released: 2023
- Genre: Feature film soundtrack
- Length: 5:43
- Language: Gujarati
- Label: K Brothers Music

All lyrics are written by Bhargav Purohit; all music is composed by Kedar and Bhargav.

Track listing
No.	Title	Singer(s)	Length
1.	"Tehunk"	Aditya Gadhvi, Kedar and Bhargav	2:56
2.	"Bheruda"	Jigardan Gadhavi, Kedar and Bhargav	2:47
Total length:			5:43

== Marketing and release ==
The teaser of the film released on 15 July 2023. The trailer of the film was released on 21 July by Amitabh Bachhan. The film was initially set to be released on 18 August 2023, but it was rescheduled and then released on 25 August 2023.

== Reception ==
The film was well received by the audience. It was declared a blockbuster at the box office and grossed over ₹12.56 crore (US$1.3 million) in its first week. It collected ₹26.11 crore (US$2.7 million) in its 20-day run, becoming the second-highest grossing Gujarati film of all time behind Chaal Jeevi Laiye!.

Akanksha Vasavada of The Times of India rated it 4 out of 5. She praised story, direction and performances while noting that the second half needed "tighter" editing. Rachana Joshi writing for Mid-Day Gujarati rated it 3 out of 5. She praised performances, direction and story but criticised the screenplay and editing.

== See also ==
- List of Gujarati films of 2023
- List of highest-grossing Gujarati films
