= Esha Kansara =

Indian television actress (born 1992)

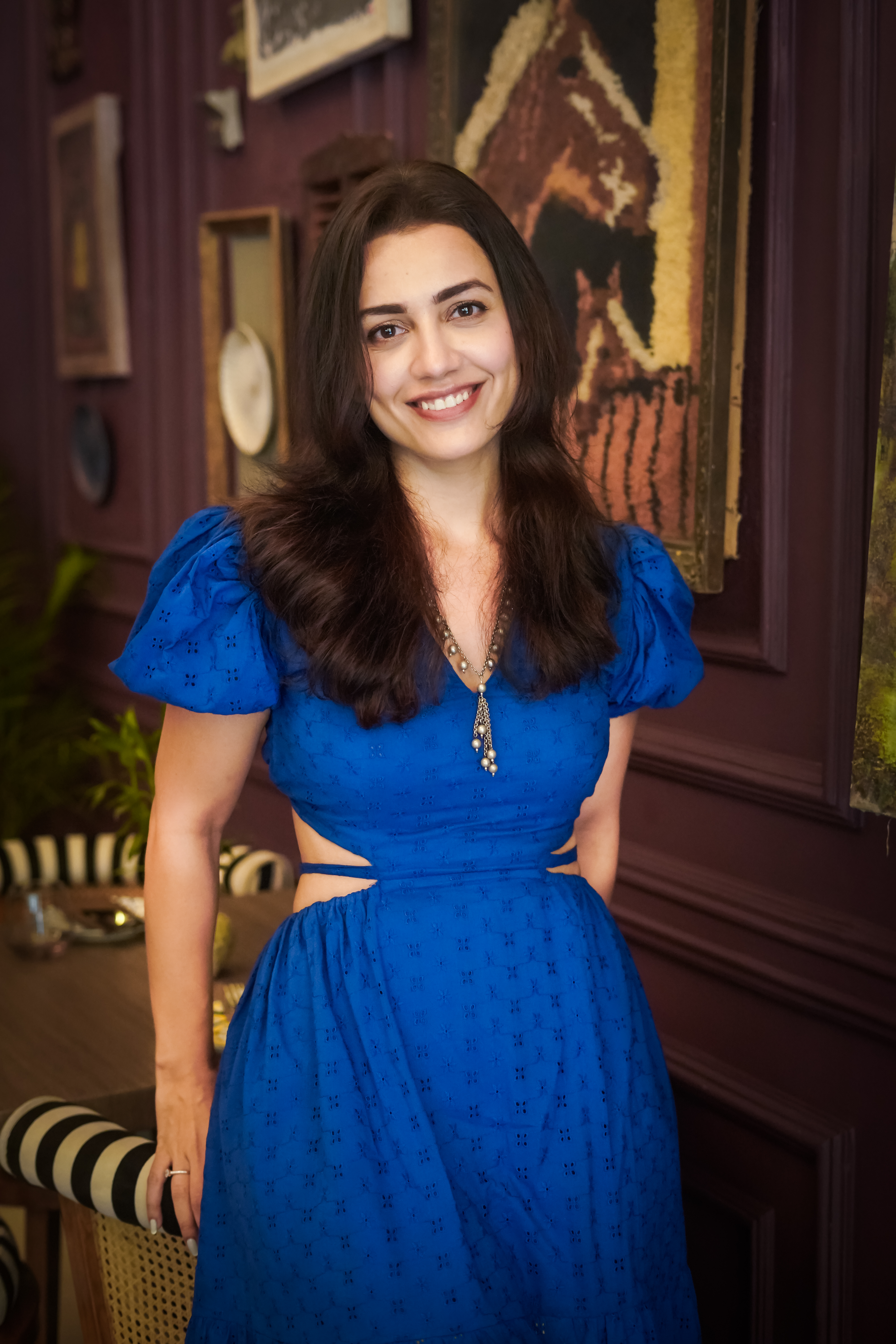
- Kansara in 2024
- Born: 20 August 1992 (age 34); Ahmedabad, Gujarat, India
- Occupations: Dancer; Actress
- Years active: 2010–present
- Notable work: Maddam Sir; Zindagi Mere Ghar Aana; 3 Ekka; Fakt Purusho Maate
- Spouse: Siddharth Bhavsar (m. 2022)

Esha Kansara (born 20 August 1992) is an Indian actress who primarily works in Gujarati films and Hindi television. Kansara has appeared in series such as Mukti Bandhan and Meri Bhabhi, Maddam Sir (2020) and Zindagi Mere Ghar Aana (2021). Following her film debut with Duniyadari (2017), Kansara appeared in successful films 3 Ekka (2023), Fakt Purusho Maate (2024), Builder Boys (2024) and Naankhatai (2025). She recently appeared in a Gujarati web series, titled Kajodu (2026).

== Personal life ==
Kansara was born in Ahmedabad on 20 August 1992. In 2022, Kansara married Siddharth Amit Bhavsar, a music composer and singer.

== Career ==
Kansara in 2023

Kansara's acting career began in 2010 with a Hindi TV serial, Mukti Bandhan, which was an adaptation of the novel Mukti Bandhan by Shri Harkisan Mehta. She then played roles in Ek Nanad Ki Khushiyon Ki Chaabi...Meri Bhabhi and Maddam Sir. Kansara played the role of Kritika. Later on, she made a cameo in Maddam Sirin which she portrayed the character of Misri Pandey. In 2021, Kansara starred in another Hindi TV serial named Zindagi Mere Ghar Aana in which she played the role of Amrita.

Kansara has also portrayed roles in Gujarati films. She debuted in Gujarati cinema in 2017 with Duniyadaari opposite Malhar Thakar. In 2018, she starred in another Gujarati film named Midnights with Menka opposite Malhar Thakar. In the same year, she starred in another Gujarati film, Vandha Vilas, in which she played the role of Shivani. Later in 2018, she starred in Mijaaj, opposite Malhar Thakar, making her first appearance in an action film. In 2022, she starred in the Gujarati romantic film Prem Prakaran which was a coming-of age cinema with a story of a love triangle starring Gaurav Paswala and Deeksha Joshi.

Kansara's 2023 film, 3 Ekka, had been a blockbuster hit, generating over 20 crores in the first 2 weeks of its release. In 3 Ekka, Kansara plays the role of Jhanvi, a craft teacher at school whose morals and values do not allow her boyfriend (played by Yash Soni) to gamble for his friends, who are in big trouble. In 2024, she starred in two films, Builder Boys and Fakt Purusho Maate.

And in 2025, she starred in a Gujarati film named Naankhatai] opposite Tatsat Munshi in which she plays the role of Maithili followed by a web series named Kajodu in 2026 opposite Mitra Gadhvi.

== Filmography ==
=== Films ===
Year	Title	Role	Ref.
2017	Duniyadari	Kavita Zaveri	
2018	Mijaaj	Jahnvi	
2018	Vandha Villas	Shivani	
2018	Midnights with Menka	Esha	
2022	Prem Prakaran	Riya	
2023	3 Ekka	Jhanvi	
2024	Builder Boys	Divya	
2024	Fakt Purusho Maate	Radhika	
2025	Shubhchintak		
2025	Naankhatai	Maithili	
2026	Kajodu	Sonal	
2026	Firki	Pooja	

=== Television ===
Year	Title	Role	Ref.
2010	Dance India Dance	Contestant	
2011	Mukti Bandhan	Devki Shah	
2011	Kitchen Champion 4	Contestant	
2013–2014	Ek Nanad Ki Khushiyon Ki Chaabi… Meri Bhabhi	Kritika Anand Shergill "Kittu"	
2019	My Name Ijj Lakhan	Radha	
2020, 2022, 2023	Maddam Sir	SI/SHO Misri Pandey	
2021–2022	Zindagi Mere Ghar Aana	Amrita Sakhuja	
