= Fakt Mahilao Maate =

2022 Indian film by Jay Bodas

- Directed by: Jay Bodas
- Written by: Karan Bhanushali
- Produced by: Anand Pandit; Vaishal Shah
- Starring: Yash Soni; Deeksha Joshi
- Cinematography: Bibhu Das
- Edited by: Nirav Panchal
- Music by: Kedar Bhargav; Bhargav Purohit
- Production company: Anand Pandit Motion Pictures
- Release date: 19 August 2022
- Running time: 137 minutes
- Country: India
- Language: Gujarati
- Box office: est. ₹20 crore (US$2.1 million)

Fakt Mahilao Maate (lit. 'For Women Only') is an Indian Gujarati-language film directed by Jay Bodas and written by Karan Bhanushali. It stars Yash Soni and Deeksha Joshi with Amitabh Bachchan in a special appearance. The film was released on 19 August 2022.

== Synopsis ==
After praying at a temple, a young man suddenly finds himself able to read the thoughts of all women. While he's panicked at first, he decides to use this power to help others with their relationship problems.

== Cast ==
- Amitabh Bachchan as Kanji Parikh, Chintan's father (special appearance)
- Yash Soni as Chintan Parikh
- Deeksha Joshi as Sneha, Chintan's girlfriend
- Tarjanee Bhadla as Meghna Parikh, Chintan's sister
- Bhavini Jani as Champaben Parikh, Chintan's grandmother
- Deep Vaidya
- Om Bhatt
- Kalpana Gagdekar as Ketki Parikh, Kanji's wife and Chintan's mother
- Prashant Barot

== Production ==
=== Filming ===
Principal photography began on 11 March 2022 in Gujarat. On 26 July 2022, entire shooting of the film wrapped up.

== Soundtrack ==
Fakt Mahilao Maate

Soundtrack album by Kedar Upadhyay and Bhargav Purohit
- Released: 2022
- Recorded: 2022
- Genre: Feature film soundtrack
- Length: 6:11
- Language: Marathi

Official audio
- Fakt Mahilao Maate – Full Album on YouTube

Track listing
No.	Title	Singer(s)	Length
1.	"Fakt Mahilao Maate"	Nakash Aziz	2:26
2.	"Bol Maari Ambe"	Kirtidan Gadhavi	3:45
Total length:			6:11

== Critical reception ==
Fakt Mahilao Maate movie received positive reviews from critics. Rachana Joshi of Mid-Day wrote "The film should be watched to get the message along with the entertainment and to get the privilege of seeing megastar Amitabh Bachchan speaking Gujarati. A good example of new subject and new story coming in Urban Gujarati films is 'Only for Women'". A Reviewer of Divya Bhaskar says "The best thing about this movie is its screenplay. At no point will you feel that the movie has slowed down a bit or that the scenes have become long. The director has shown every scene to the point".

== Sequel ==
The film was followed by the 2024 film Fakt Purusho Maate focused on gender equality and generational patriarchy.

== See also ==
- List of Gujarati films of 2022
- List of highest-grossing Gujarati films
- List of Gujarati films
