= Naadi Dosh =

2022 Indian Gujarati film

- Official poster
- Directed by: Krishnadev Yagnik
- Written by: Krishnadev Yagnik
- Produced by: Nilay Chotai; Munna Shukul; Harshad Shah; Bhaumik Gondaliya
- Starring: Yash Soni; Janki Bodiwala; Raunaq Kamdar
- Cinematography: Prashant Gohel; Haresh Bhanushali
- Music by: Kedar-Bhargav
- Production companies: Ananta Businesscorp; Shukul Studios; Big box series
- Distributed by: Panorama Studios
- Release date: 17 June 2022
- Running time: 131 minutes
- Country: India
- Language: Gujarati
- Box office: ₹11.85Cr

Naadi Dosh is a 2022 Gujarati-language film, directed by Krishnadev Yagnik starring Yash Soni, Raunaq Kamdar, and Janki Bodiwala produced by Nilay Chotai, Munna Shukul, & Harshad Shah, and distributed by Panorama Studios.

== Plot ==
New generation love birds, Riddhi and Kevin, shrewdly tackle the issue of 'Naadi Dosh', a mismatch or 'dosh' amongst two astrological charts of individuals which may cause issues after marriage.

== Cast ==
- Yash Soni as Kevin
- Janki Bodiwala as Riddhi
- Raunaq Kamdar as Krunal
- Prashant Barot
- Dipika Raval
- Ashish Kakkad
- Ravi Gohil as Nishith
- Maitri Joshi
- Ridham Rajyaguru
- Karan Dave
- Ratilal Parmar
- Rahul Goswami
- Kalpesh Shukal
- Ronak Madgut
- Chinmay Parmar
- Ditya Mistry

== Development ==
The Official trailer of the movie was launched on 17 May 2022 on YouTube Channel. The music was acquired by Panorama Studios. For the marketing and promotion Colors Gujarati joined hands with the project. The music of the film was composed by Kedar-Bhargav. The first song Lavva Lavvi was sung by Jigardan Gadhavi and Vrattini Ghadge, while the second song Chandaliyo was sung by Aishwarya Majumdar.

== Soundtrack ==
Naadi Dosh

Studio album by Kedar-Bhargav, Jigardan Gadhavi, Vrattini Ghadge, Aishwarya Majumdar,
- Released: 30 May 2022
- Genre: Feature film soundtrack
- Label: Panorama Music

=== Tracklist ===
The soundtrack of the album is composed by Kedar - Bhargav with lyrics written by Bhargav Purohit. The soundtrack album consists of Four tracks. All Four song of the film has been released by Panorama Music.

No.	Title	Lyrics	Music	Singer(s)	Length
1.	"Lavva Lavvi"	Bhargav Purohit	Kedar - Bhargav	Jigardan Gadhavi & Vrattini Ghadge	2:25
2.	"Chandaliyo"	Bhargav Purohit	Kedar - Bhargav	Aishwarya Majumdar	2.22
3.	"Khamma"	Bhargav Purohit	Kedar - Bhargav	Kedar Upadhyay	6.02
4.	"Mithi Madhuri "	Bhargav Purohit	Kedar - Bhargav	Kedar Upadhyay	3.06
