= Samandar (film) =

2024 film directed by Vishal Vada Vala

- Theatrical Poster
- Directed by: Vishal Vada Vala
- Written by: Swapnil Mehta; Vishal Vada Vala
- Produced by: Kalpesh Palan; Udayraj Shekhwa
- Starring: Mayur Chauhan; Jagjeetsinh Vadher
- Cinematography: Mihir Fichadiya
- Production companies: KP & UD Motion Pictures
- Distributed by: Rupam Entertainment Pvt Ltd
- Release date: 17 May 2024
- Running time: 172 minutes
- Country: India
- Language: Gujarati

Samandar is a 2024 Indian Gujarati-language gangster drama film directed by Vishal Vada Vala. The film stars Mayur Chauhan and Jagjeetsinh Vadher in lead roles, alongside a supporting ensemble cast. Produced by Kalpesh Palan and Udayraj Shekhwa, the project is distributed by Rupam Entertainment Pvt. Ltd.

== Plot ==
Set against the backdrop of the ruthless and entrenched fisheries mafia, Samandar follows childhood friends Uday and Salman, who forge an unbreakable bond while navigating the perilous waters of their criminal underworld. As they rise through the ranks, their alliance is tested by escalating tensions involving power struggles, political machinations, and personal vendettas. What begins as a shared ambition soon fractures under the weight of betrayal and revenge, unraveling their once-unshakable camaraderie and plunging them into a high-stakes conflict with irreversible consequences.

== Cast ==
- Mayur Chauhan as Uday
- Jagjeetsinh Vadher as Salman
- Dharmendra Gohil
- Deeksha Joshi
- Reeva Rachh
- Chetan Dhanani
- Mayur Soneji
- Kalpana Gagdekar
- Dhara Trivedi
- Nilesh Parmar
- Akshay Mehta
- Dhairya Thakkar
- Tirth Thakkar
- Dr. Prashant Panchlothia

== Production ==
Filming for Samandar took place across multiple locations in Porbandar, Gujarat, capturing the coastal town's distinct regional essence. The film marks the first collaborative production venture of Kalpesh Palan and Udayraj Shekhwa under their banner KP & UD Motion Pictures.

The soundtrack and background score were composed by the duo Kedar & Bhargav, featuring vocals from prominent Gujarati and Indian playback singers, including Nakash Aziz, Aditya Gadhvi, Vratini Purohit, Bhargav Purohit, Osman Mir, and Amir Mir, among others. The music production aimed to blend traditional Gujarati folk influences with contemporary orchestration to complement the film's gritty narrative.

This collaborative effort highlights the producers' focus on merging authentic regional storytelling with technical expertise in music and cinematography.

== Soundtrack ==
Samandar

Studio album by Kedar and Bhargav
- Released: 26 February 2024
- Genre: Feature film soundtrack
- Labels: KP & UD Motion Pictures

=== Tracklist ===
All lyrics are written by Bhargav Purohit; all music is composed by Kedar and Bhargav.

No.	Title	Singer(s)	Length
1.	"Maar Halesa"	Aditya Gadhvi & Nakash Aziz	2:54
2.	"Dil Na Dariya Ma"	Vratini Purohit & Mayur Chauhan	3:08
3.	"Saavaj Na Thekana"	Bhargav Purohit	4:07
4.	"Tu Maro Dariyo"	B Praak	4:17
5.	"Chundadi"	Stuti Karani, Lipika Nag, Vrattini Ghadge	1:25
6.	"Maula Ali Maula"	Amir Mir and Osman Mir	5:10
7.	"Bharati Aave Che"	Romy	5:03
Total length:			26:53

== Release ==
The film was officially announced on 30 August 2023. Its promotional campaign commenced with the release of the first single, "Maar Halesa", on 26 February 2024, featuring vocals by Aditya Gadhvi and Nakash Aziz. This was followed by the second track, "Dil na Dariya Ma", released on 11 March 2024 and sung by Vartini Purohit. The third song, "Saavaj Na Thekana", debuted on 10 April 2024. Samandar was scheduled to release theatrically on 17 May 2024.

== Reception ==
Samandar received generally positive reviews from critics. Rachana Joshi of Mid-Day Gujarati awarded the film 3.5 out of 5 stars, commending its "compelling story, sharp direction, impactful performances, polished production, and soulful music," though she critiqued its "excessive runtime." Harsh Bhatt of Gujarat First News rated it 4 out of 5, lauding the "gripping narrative, tightly woven screenplay, adept direction, and visually striking cinematography."

== See also ==
- List of Gujarati films of 2024
