= Aarjav Trivedi =

Indian actor

- Occupation: Actor
- Years active: 2015–present
- Spouse: Neel Soni (m. 2019)

Aarjav Trivedi is an Indian actor who works in Gujarati cinema and theatre. He made his film debut in Chhello Divas (2015) and has since appeared in Shu Thayu? (2018), Hellaro (2019) and Umbarro (2025). In 2026 he played one of the two leads in Dhabkaaro.

== Career ==
Trivedi made his screen debut as Dhulo in Chhello Divas (2015), a coming-of-age comedy directed by Krishnadev Yagnik. He later appeared as Viral in Yagnik's Shu Thayu? (2018).

In 2019 he played Arjan in Abhishek Shah's Hellaro, which won the National Film Award for Best Feature Film at the 66th National Film Awards. The same year he featured in the Navratri song "Leela Laher", composed by Raag Mehta and Zalak Pandya, opposite his Hellaro co-star Denisha Gumrah.

During the 2020 lockdown he began an Instagram series.

He appeared as Kirti in Umbarro (2025), and in 2026 played Kano, a taxi driver, opposite Deven Bhojani in Shah's Dhabkaaro. Reviewing the film, Koimoi described him as an effective counterpart to Bhojani in the lead pairing.

== Personal life ==
Trivedi married Neel Soni on 18 January 2019.

== Filmography ==
Year	Film	Role	Notes
2015	Chhello Divas	Dhulo	Debut
2017	Shubh Aarambh	Laala	
2017	Duniyadari	Dharmesh Shankarbhai Patel	
2018	Shu Thayu?	Viral	
2019	Hellaro	Arjan	
2022	53 Mu Panu		
2022	Dhaman		
2023	21 Divas	Karan	
2023	Anokhee	Aaryan	
2023	I Wish	Raj	
2024	Udan Chhoo	Hardik Papadwala	
2025	Umbarro	Kirti	
2026	Laagni No Melo	Shubh	
2026	Dhabkaaro	Kano	
