= Baap Manus =

- Theatrical release poster
- Directed by: Yogesh Phulpagar
- Produced by: Anand Pandit; Roopa Pandit; Pushkar Jog; Vaishal Shah; Rahul Dubey
- Starring: Pushkar Jog; Anusha Dandekar; Kushal Badrike; Shubhangi Gokhale; Keya Ingle
- Production companies: Anand Pandit Motion Pictures; Goosebumps Entertainment
- Release date: 1 September 2023
- Country: India
- Language: Marathi

Baap Manus (transl. Father Man) is a 2023 Indian Marathi-language family drama film directed by Yogesh Phulpagar in his directorial debut, from story screenplay and dialogues by Omkar Gokhale, Jeet Ashok and Virajas Kulkarni. It is produced by Anand Pandit and Pushkar Jog's production houses Anand Pandit Motion Pictures and Goosebumps Entertainment respectively. The film stars Pushkar Jog, Anusha Dandekar, Kushal Badrike, Shubhangi Gokhale and child actor Keya Ingle in lead roles.

== Cast ==
- Pushkar Jog
- Anusha Dandekar
- Kushal Badrike
- Shubhangi Gokhale
- Keya Ingle

== Production ==
Baap Manus film is Anand Pandit’s sixth association with Pushkar Jog, previous collaborations are Well Done Baby and Victoria - Ek Rahasya. Yogesh Phulpagar is making his directorial debut with the film.

Pushkar Jog was joined the film after completed production of Victoria Ek Rahasya in Scotland. Anusha Dandekar joined in November 2022, made her debut in Marathi cinema. Kushal Badrike also confirmed for lead role in the film.

The shooting of the film was held in London.

== Release ==
The film was theatrically released on 1 September 2023, previously it was scheduled to be released on 16 June 2023 and then 25 August 2023.

== Reception ==
Jaydeep Pathakjee of Maharashtra Times rated 3.0 stars out of 5 stars and wrote "It is an emotional film with a family twist. Those who are used to watching such movies may like Baap Manus." Mihir Bhanage of The Times of India rated 2.5 stars out of 5 stars and wrote "The concept is endearing, and the effort is heartfelt, but the outcome isn't as impactful as it should've been."
