= Hitu Kanodia =

Indian Actor and Politician

Member of Legislative Assembly, Gujarat
- In office 2017–2022
- Constituency: Idar

Personal details
- Born: Hitesh Kanodia; 21 February 1970 (age 56) Kanoda, Gujarat, India
- Party: Bharatiya Janata Party
- Spouse: Mona Thiba (m. 2014)
- Parent: Naresh Kanodia (father) and Ratan Kanodia (mother)
- Relatives: Mahesh Kanodia (uncle)
- Occupation: Actor, politician

Hitu Kanodia (born 21 February 1970) is Gujarati film actor and politician from Gujarat, India.

== Biography ==
Hitu Kanodia was born on 21 February 1970 to actor-politician Naresh Kanodia and Ratan Kanodia. He has studied 12th grade. He started his film career as a child artist. He has acted in over 125 Gujarati films.

He contested from Kadi constituency in 2012 Gujarat Legislative Assembly election but lost. He was elected as a member of the Gujarat Legislative Assembly in 2017 election from Idar constituency.

== Personal life ==
Hitu Kanodia married actress Mona Thiba on 14 August 2014 in Ahmedabad. They have a son, Rajveer, born in 2015.

== Selected filmography ==
As a child artist

Key
†	Denotes films that have not yet been released

Year	Title	Role	Language	Notes
	Dholi		Gujarati	
	Saiba Mora			
	Dhola Maru			
	Meru Mulade			
	Ujali Meraman			
	Vanzari Vav			
	Dharmo			
	Meru Mulade			
	Jog Sanjog			
	Lekhne mathe mekh			
	Sati Aur Bhagwan		Hindi	
	Sanp tyan Jump			
	Vat, Vachan and Ver			
	Jugal jodi			
1985	Meru Malan			
	Raj Kunwar			

As an adult actor

Key
†	Denotes films that have not yet been released

Year	Title	Role	Language	Notes
2000	Saajan Tane Mara Sam		Gujarati	
2000	Mandanio morVahurani		Gujarati	
2000	Janmo Janam		Gujarati	
2000	Raj Ratan		Gujarati	
2000	Govaliyo		Gujarati	
2000	Lakhtarni ladi ne Vilayatno var		Gujarati	
2000	Senthinu sindoor		Gujarati	
2000	Ma te ma bija vagdana va		Gujarati	
2000	Man, Moti ne kach		Gujarati	
2000	Dadane Aangan Tulsi		Gujarati	
2000	Dikri to parki thapan kahevay		Gujarati	
2000	Me to dungar kleine ghar re karya		Gujarati	
2000	Kaydo		Gujarati	
2000	Vagi kale katar tara premni		Gujarati	
2000	Vaagya Preetuna Dhol		Gujarati	
2000	Rajveer – rahasyamay premktha		Gujarati	
2000	Chare disha cheharma		Gujarati	
2014	Nahi Re Chute Taro Saath		Gujarati	
2014	Vishwasghat		Gujarati	
2014	Deewana Dushman		Gujarati	
2014	Hal Bheru America		Gujarati	
2014	No tension		Gujarati	
2014	Nahin re chute taro saath		Gujarati	
2014	Daldu didhu me kartakna melama		Gujarati	
2014	Garibni dikri, sasariyama thikri		Gujarati	
2022	Raado		Gujarati	
2022	Madhav		Gujarati	
2023	Vash	Atharv	Gujarati	
2023	Hu		Gujarati	
2023	Shubh Yatra		Gujarati	
2023	3 Ekka		Gujarati	
2024	Prem No Padkar		Gujarati	
2024	Kamthaan		Gujarati	
2024	Jagat		Gujarati	
2024	Nasoor		Gujarati	
2025	Chhutachheda		Gujarati	
2025	Taaro Thayo		Gujarati	
2025	Faati Ne?	Param Lal	Gujarati	
2025	Shubhchintak	Tejas	Gujarati	
2025	Vash Level 2	Atharv	Gujarati	
	Misri	PI	Gujarati	
2026	Jai Kanhaiyalall Ki		Gujarati	

== Awards ==
- Award for Best Child Artist for the film "Meru Mulade" (1980–81)
- Award for Best Child Artist for the film "Jugal Jodi" (Combined with Bhavik Vyas) (1982–83)
- Award for Best Child Artist for the film "Ujali Meraman" (1985–86)
- Award for Best Actor for the film " Saajan Tane Mara Sam "
