= Chaniya Toli =

2025 Indian Gujarati comedy drama film

- Official Poster
- Directed by: Jay Bodas; Parth Trivedi
- Written by: Jay Bodas; Parth Trivedi; Pratiksinh Chavda
- Produced by: Anand Pandit; Vaishal Shah
- Starring: Yash Soni; Ragi Jani; Sohni Bhatt; Netri Trivedi; Heena Varde; Chetan Daiya; Maulik Nayak; Vaishakh Rathodd
- Cinematography: Ankit Trivedi
- Edited by: Nirav Panchal
- Music by: Kedar Bhargav
- Production companies: Anand Pandit Motion Pictures; Jannock Films
- Distributed by: Rupam Entertainment Pvt Ltd
- Release date: 21 October 2025
- Running time: 130 minutes
- Country: India
- Language: Gujarati
- Budget: ₹5 crore
- Box office: ₹22.80 crore

Chaniya Toli is a 2025 Indian Gujarati comedy drama heist film directed by Jay Bodas and Parth Trivedi and written by Jay Bodas, Parth Trivedi and Pratiksinh Chavda. It stars Yash Soni, Ragi Jani, Netri Trivedi, Heena Varde, Chetan Daiya, Maulik Nayak and others. The film is produced by Anand Pandit from Anand Pandit Motion Pictures and Vaishal Shah from Jannock Films. It was released nationwide on 21 October 2025.

== Plot ==
A man seeking life's purpose discovers a village in financial crisis. He plots to steal from those responsible, leading villagers on an amusing adventure to outsmart the system.

== Cast ==
- Yash Soni as Prakash Mistry, a teacher
- Ragi Jani as Peshawar
- Netri Trivedi as Naina
- Heena Varde
- Chetan Daiya as MLA
- Maulik Nayak as Reporter
- Jay Bhatt as PI Zala
- Nikita Sharma as Sheetal
- Sohni Bhatt as Modasa
- Kalpana Gagdekar
- Shilpa Thaker
- Jassi Gadhvi as Junagadh
- Utsav busa
- Janki Bodiwala in a special appearance in the song "Popat"

== Soundtrack ==
Chaniya Toli

Studio album by Kedar Bhargav
- Released: 2025
- Genre: Feature film soundtrack
- Length: 4:43
- Language: Gujarati
External audio
- Chaniya Toli Full Album on JioSaavn

=== Tracklist ===
All lyrics are written by Traditional, Manu Rabari; all music is composed by Kedar Bhargav

No.	Title	Lyrics	Music	Singer(s)	Length
1.	"Popat"	Traditional, Manu Rabari	Kedar Bhargav	Rakesh Barot, Jahnvi Shrimankar	4:43
Total length:					4:43

"Popat" song is played after the film end and is an item song unrelated to the plot.

== Production ==
The film went on floors on 10 April 2025 and was extensively shot at different locations in Gujarat, including in Sunav village near Anand.

== Marketing and release ==
The first motion poster and still poster of the film were unveiled on 29 August 2025. On 5 September 2025, coinciding with Teachers’ Day, the teaser was released on social media platforms. The first single, titled Popat, was released on 16 September 2025, featuring a performance by Janki Bodiwala. The song is composed by Kedar Bhargav with lyrics by Manu Rabari and traditional verses, and is sung by Rakesh Barot and Jahnvi Shrimankar.The trailer was officially launched on 1 October 2025 at Swarnim Nagari Garba event in Ahmedabad. The film was released in theaters nationwide on 21 October 2025.

== See also ==
- List of Gujarati films of 2025
- List of highest-grossing Gujarati films
- List of Gujarati films
