= Chhello Divas =

- Official poster
- Directed by: Krishnadev Yagnik
- Written by: Krishnadev Yagnik
- Produced by: Vaishal Shah; Aayush Mehta; Bhaumik Gondaliya; Sharad Patel; Nilay Chotai; Pranay Kabra; Sandil Dang; Krunal Vyas
- Starring: Malhar Thakar; Yash Soni; Aarjav Trivedi; Rahul Raval; Janki Bodiwala; Kinjal Rajpriya; Netri Trivedi
- Cinematography: Alex Mecwan
- Edited by: Nirav Panchal
- Music by: Meghdhanush; Harsh Trivedi; Parth Bharat Thakkar
- Production companies: Belvedere Films; SP Cinecorp
- Release date: 20 November 2015
- Running time: 132 minutes
- Country: India
- Language: Gujarati
- Budget: ₹2.8 crore (US$290,000)
- Box office: ₹18 crore (US$1.9 million)

Chhello Divas – A New Beginning (transl. The Last Day – A New Beginning) is a Gujarati coming of age comedy film, written and directed by Krishnadev Yagnik. The film stars Malhar Thakar, Yash Soni, Mitra Gadhavi, Aarjav Trivedi, Rahul Raval, Janki Bodiwala, Kinjal Rajpriya, and Netri Trivedi. The plot revolves around the lives of eight friends in their last year of college.

The film premiered on 20 November 2015 and garnered critical acclaim. The film was remade in Hindi as Days of Tafree.

== Plot ==
Chhello Divas begins after the friends finish their final-year exams, when Vicky and his college friends go out together and are involved in a car accident that leaves Vicky hospitalized. The film then shifts into an extended flashback showing the group’s last phase of college life.

In the flashback, Vicky’s chronic lateness triggers a phone argument with his friend Nikhil (Nick), who is waiting for him at college. A misunderstanding during the call leads to a confrontation between the two friends, after which they regroup and are joined by their wider circle, including Loy, Dev, Dhula, and the talkative Naresh. Their days revolve around lectures, pranks, and escalating personal dramas as graduation approaches.

Romances develop within the group. Nikhil becomes interested in Pooja but hesitates because of her connection to his former girlfriend Vandana. Meanwhile, Dhula’s aggressive behavior draws Isha into an uncomfortable relationship dynamic.

A separate track begins when Loy’s family starts arranging his marriage meeting with Nisha. Loy and his friends initially try to derail the proposal, but events take a different turn, and Nisha later seeks admission to HD College. With help from Vicky’s family connection, she is admitted, and Vicky and Nisha grow closer and begin a relationship.

Back in the present, Vicky recovers from the accident. As the friends face the “last day” reality, Dev pushes Nikhil to stop overthinking and finally speak openly to Pooja. The film closes on the group’s final burst of chaos and emotion, with confessions and interruptions colliding as their college life comes to an end.

== Cast ==
- Malhar Thakar as Vicky
- Yash Soni as Nikhil/Nick
- Mitra Gadhavi as Loy
- Aarjav Trivedi as Dhula
- Rahul Raval as Dev
- Janki Bodiwala as Pooja
- Kinjal Rajpriya as Nisha
- Netri Trivedi as Isha
- Mayur Chauhan as Naresh
- Prapti Ajwalia as Vandana
- Prashant Barot as Nikhil's Father
- Beena Shah as Nikhil's Mother
- Jeetendra Thakkar as Vicky's Father
- Harsha Bhavsar as Vicky's Mother
- Jignesh Modi as Ghanshyam
- Jay Rathod as Loy's Father
- Ratilal Parmar as Nisha's Father
- Dipika Ajwalia as Nisha's Mother
- Jay Bhatt as Angry Professor
- Kartavya Shah as Drama Professor
- Ridham Bhat as Sheetal, Tuition Teacher
- Anita Pursawani as Tel No Dabbo

== Production ==
The film was shot in various locations across Ahmedabad and Vadodara, including Shanti Business School and Sabarmati Riverfront.

== Release ==
The film was released on 20 November 2015 in 231 screens worldwide.

== Soundtrack ==
Chhello Divas

Soundtrack album by Meghdhanush (band)
- Released: 20 September 2015 (Film)
- Recorded: 2015
- Studio: Sangeet Music Studio
- Genre: Feature Film soundtrack
- Length: 7:41
- Label: Sangeet Music

Official audio
- Chhello Divas - Jukebox on YouTube

All lyrics are written by Tushar Shukla.

Chhello Divas (Original Motion Picture Soundtrack)
No.	Title	Singer(s)	Length
1.	"Kehvu Ghanu Ghanu Che"	Parthiv Ghohil	04:20
2.	"Canteen Time"	Jeffery Iqbal; Neil Chakravarthy	03:21
Total length:			07:41

== Reception ==
The film had more than 50-day run. The film was a commercial success and grossed ₹18 crore (US$1.9 million) on box office

== Piracy ==
Before the release of the film, a copy of the film meant for the Central Board of Film Certification leaked online. The producers claimed they faced loss of ₹5 crore (US$520,000) due to the piracy. Two clerks in the Entertainment Tax Commissioner office in Gandhinagar were arrested in the case.

== Remake ==
The film was remade in Hindi as the Days of Tafree (2016).

== See also ==
- List of highest-grossing Gujarati films
