= Trisha on the Rocks =

2024 Indian film directed by Krishnadev Yagnik

Trisha On The Rocks
- Official Theatrical Poster
- Directed by: Krishnadev Yagnik
- Written by: Krishnadev Yagnik
- Produced by: Kalpesh K Soni; Krunal Soni; Bhaumik Gondaliya
- Starring: Janki Bodiwala; Ravi Gohil; Hiten Kumar
- Cinematography: Pratik Parmar
- Production companies: K S Entertainment LLP; Big Box Series Pvt Ltd
- Distributed by: Panorama Studios
- Release date: 21 June 2024
- Running time: 172 minutes
- Country: India
- Language: Gujarati

Trisha On The Rocks is a 2024 Gujarati romantic comedy drama film, directed and written by Krishnadev Yagnik. It stars Janki Bodiwala, Ravi Gohil, and Hiten Kumar. The film is produced by Kalpesh K Soni and Krunal Soni and it was distributed by Panorama Studios.

== Plot ==
One night, Trisha (Janki Bodiwala) meets Vishal (Ravi Gohil) at a party. They come from different backgrounds and have different lifestyles. Vishal is a careless guy and Trisha is a fun-loving girl. Their meeting leads to super fun chaos with the cutest romance in their lives. They have a one-night stand and Trisha becomes pregnant. Her father is angry at first but becomes happy to be a grandfather but she refuses to marry Vishal. But Vishal wants to marry her.

== Cast ==
- Janki Bodiwala as Trisha
- Ravi Gohil as Vishal
- Hiten Kumar as Trisha's father

== Production ==
The film was shot at various locations in Ahmedabad Gujarat. Krishnadev Yagnik debuting as music director with Trisha On The Rocks.

== Soundtrack ==
Trisha On The Rocks

Studio album by Krishnadev Yagnik
- Released: 16 May 2024
- Genre: Feature film soundtrack
- Label: Big Box Music

=== Tracklist ===
All lyrics are written by Roshan Tamang, Bhargav Purohit; all music is composed by Krishnadev Yagnik.

No.	Title	Lyrics	Music	Singer(s)	Length
1.	"Monarita"	Roshan Tamang	Krishnadev Yagnik	Binny Sharma	3:37
2.	"Lai Ja"	Bhargav Purohit	Krishnadev Yagnik	Aishwarya Majumdar	3:00
3.	"Thehre Ye Lamhe"	Bhargav Purohit	Krishnadev Yagnik	Aishwarya Majumdar	3:00
Total length:					09:37

== Release ==
The teaser of the film was released on 9 May 2024. A Monarita song released on 20 May 2024. was sung by Binny Sharma. Another song "Lai Ja" released on 27 May 2024, was sung by Aishwarya Majumdar. The Hindi version of the song named "Thehre ye lamhe", was also sung by Aishwarya Majumdar.

== Reception ==
Mahpara Kabir of ABP Live rated it 3.5 out of 5. He praised performances, direction, story and concept. Simran Singh of DNA rated it 3.5 out of 5. She praised direction, story, music and performances.

== See also ==
- List of Gujarati films of 2024
- List of Hindi films of 2024
