= Mithada Maheman =

2025 Indian Gujarati drama film

- Official Poster
- Directed by: Chinmay Parmar
- Written by: Chinmay Parmar
- Produced by: Nikhil Mangnani; Ritesh Mavani; Chirag Sharma; Hoshang Sharma; Vishal Patel; Dilip Viradiya; Raviraj Korat; Krishnadev Yagnik
- Starring: Yash Soni; Aarohi Patel; Mitra Gadhavi; Mihir Nishith Rajda
- Cinematography: Pratik Parmar
- Edited by: Shivam Bhatt
- Music by: Rahul Munjariya
- Production companies: AdEtc Studios; Big Box Series; VSM Production
- Distributed by: Panorama Studios
- Release date: 18 April 2025
- Running time: 115 minutes
- Country: India
- Language: Gujarati

Mithada Maheman is a 2025 Indian Gujarati drama film directed and written by Chinmay Parmar. It Stars Yash Soni, Aarohi Patel, Mitra Gadhavi, Mihir Nishith Rajda and others. The film is produced by Nikhil Mangnani, Ritesh Mavani, Chirag Sharma, Hoshang Sharma, Vishal Patel, Dilip Viradiya, Raviraj Korat and Krishnadev Yagnik and it was released nationwide on 18 April 2025.

== Plot ==
Aditya is all set to end his life-until three strangers crash his plan. What follows is a rollercoaster of tragedy, comedy, and unexpected twists.

== Cast ==
- Yash Soni as Aditya
- Aarohi Patel as Komal
- Mitra Gadhavi as Jay
- Mihir Nishith Rajda as Hari
- Sonali Lele Desai as Seema
- Hiten Kumar as Sawarmal

== Soundtrack ==
Mithada Maheman

Studio album by Rahul Munjariya
- Released: 02 April 2025
- Studio: Big Box Series
- Genre: Feature film soundtrack
- Length: 7:00
- Language: Gujarati
- Label: Big Box Music
External audio
- Mithada Maheman Full Album on JioSaavn

=== Tracklist ===
All lyrics are written by Bhargav Purohit, Nandan Purohit; all music is composed by Rahul Munjariya, Aditya Gadhvi, Jigardan Gadhavi.

No.	Title	Lyrics	Music	Singer(s)	Length
1.	"Mithada Maheman"	Bhargav Purohit	Aditya Gadhvi, Rahul Munjariya	Aditya Gadhvi	3:41
2.	"Safar"	Nandan Purohit	Jigardan Gadhavi, Rahul Munjariya	Jigardan Gadhavi	3:19
Total length:					07:00

== Marketing and release ==
The film was officially announced on 16 March 2025, with its first poster and release date shared on Social media. The teaser was released on 27 March 2025, followed by the trailer on 3 April 2025. The film was released nationwide on 18 April 2025, coinciding with Good Friday.

== Reception ==
Kanksha Vasavada of The Times of India rated the film 3.5 out of 5, praising Chinmay Parmar’s debut direction and the film’s heartwarming storytelling, performances, and music. While the first half was engaging, the second half was noted to be slightly dragged, though the film was described as a worthwhile family watch.

== See also ==
- List of Gujarati films of 2025
- List of Gujarati films
