= Anand Pandit =

Indian producer (born 1963)

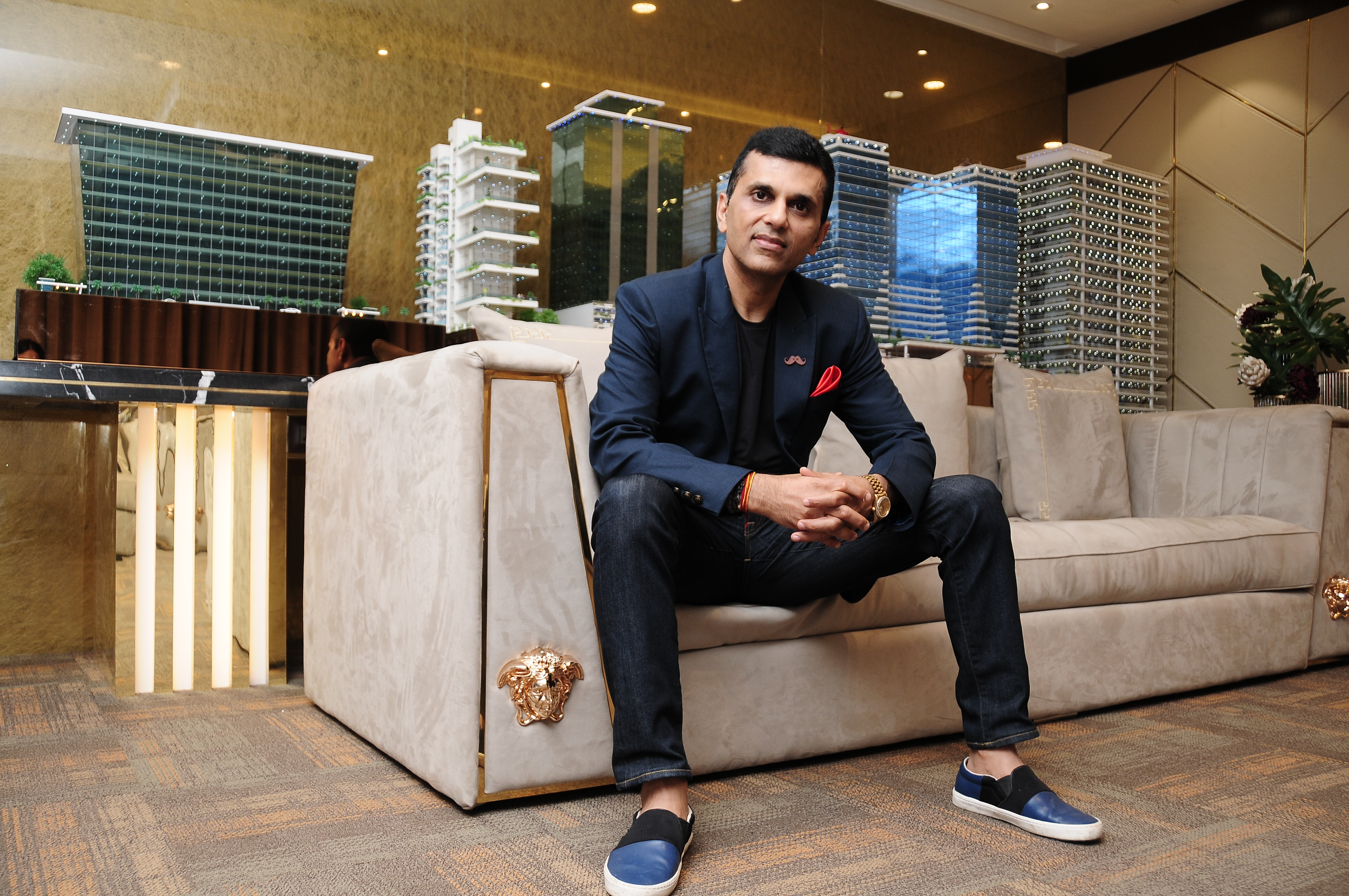
- Born: 1963 (age 62–63); India
- Occupations: Film maker; film producer; film distributor; real estate developer
- Years active: 2000–present
- Organization: Anand Pandit Motion Pictures
- Known for: Kabzaa (2023); Thank God (2022); Chehre (2021); The Big Bull (2021); Total Dhamaal (2019); Missing (2018)

Anand Pandit (born 1963) is an Indian film producer, film distributor and real estate developer. He owns Anand Pandit Motion Pictures a film studio that produces and distributes Bollywood films such as Total Dhamaal (2019), Missing (2018), Sarkar 3 (2018), and Great Grand Masti (2016). Recently, Anand Pandit has also produced a Gujarati film Fakt Mahilao Maate (2022) that did extremely well at the Box office. He has also produced several other films, including Thank God (2022), The Big Bull (2021) and Chehre (2021). He is the founder of Lotus Developers, which develops high-end real estate in Mumbai, Maharashtra.

== Career ==
Pandit entered the media and film industry in 2000 and has produced, distributed and financed multiple Bollywood films.

Anand Pandit has three films lined up for release in August 2023, Gujrati film Tron Ekka releasing on 18 August 2023, Hindi film Love-All on 25 August 2023 and Marathi film Baap Manus also on 25 August 2023.

Producer Anand Pandit forays into the South Indian industry with Kannada film Kabzaa which will be released in Hindi (dubbed) as Underworld Ka Kabzaa. The film will hit the screens in Hindi as well as the four South Indian languages on March 17, 2023.

In 2022, Anand Pandit co-produced a blockbuster Gujrati film Fakt Mahilao Maate. He was a distributor for Doctor G and produced Thank God. His Marathi film Victoria, released on 16 December 2022 and shooting has begun for his next Marathi film, Baap Maanus starring Pushkar Jog and Anusha Dandekar. In March, 2022 Pandit also announced his upcoming film Bal Shivaji, directed by Ravi Jadhav. Anand Pandit is also producing Swatantrya Veer Savarkar, a film based on the life of Veer Savarkar, starring Randeep Hooda which is slated to release on 26 May 2023.

In 2020 and 2021, Pandit had two films release the same day – The Big Bull on Disney+ Hotstar and Well Done Baby, a Marathi film on Amazon Prime Video. His most recent film as a producer is titled Chehre. The film had been postponed for theatrical release several times due to COVID-19 pandemic and was released on 27 August 2021 in theaters.

== Anand Pandit Motion Pictures (2015–present) ==
Anand Pandit Motion Pictures was founded in 2015. It mainly produces and distributes films. Here is a list of the films.

| Title | Year | Role |
|---|---|---|
| Pyaar Ka Punchnama 2 | 2015 | Distributor |
| Great Grand Masti | 2016 | Producer |
| Days of Tafree | 2016 | Producer |
| Sarkar 3 | 2017 | Producer |
| Guest iin London | 2017 | Co-producer |
| Baazaar | 2018 | Distributor |
| Missing | 2018 | Producer |
| Satyameva Jayate | 2018 | Distributor |
| Total Dhamaal | 2019 | Producer |
| PM Narendra Modi | 2019 | Producer |
| Section 375 | 2019 | Distributor |
| Khandaani Shafakhana | 2019 | Distributor |
| TI & TI | 2019 | Producer and distributor |
| Well Done Baby | 2021 | Producer |
| The Big Bull | 2021 | Producer |
| Chehre | 2021 | Producer |
| Fakt Mahilao Maate | 2022 | Producer |
| Doctor G | 2022 | Distributor |
| Thank God | 2022 | Producer |
| Drishyam 2 | 2022 | Presenter |
| Kabzaa | 2023 | Producer, Distributor and Presenter |
| 2018 | 2023 | Producer |
| 1920: Horrors of the Heart | 2023 | Presenter |
| 3 Ekka | 2023 | Producer |
| Love All | 2023 | Presenter |
| Haunted - Ghost of Past | 2023 | Producer and Presenter |
| Baap Manus | 2023 | Producer |
| Swatantrya Veer Savarkar | 2023 | Producer |
| Musafiraa | 2024 | Producer |
| Fakt Purusho Maate | 2024 | Producer |
| Jilabi | 2025 | Producer |
| Hardik Shubhechha | 2025 | Producer |
| Chaniya Toli | 2025 | Producer |
| Dhamaal 4 | 2026 | Producer |
| Haunted 3D: Echoes of the Past | 2026 | Producer |
| Vibe | 2026 | Distributor |
| Asambhauuu | 2026 | Producer |
