= Jagat (2024 film) =

2024 Gujarati drama film

- Directed by: Harshil Bhatt
- Written by: Harshil Bhatt
- Produced by: Nilay Chotai; Dipen Patel; Krishnadev Yagnik
- Starring: Yash Soni; Chetan Daiya; Riddhi Yadav
- Cinematography: Pratik Parmar
- Music by: Andrew Samuel
- Production companies: Ananta Businesscorp; Patel Processing Studios; Big Box Series
- Distributed by: Rupam Entertainment Pvt Ltd
- Release date: 3 May 2024
- Running time: 123 minutes
- Country: India
- Language: Gujarati

Jagat is a 2024 Indian Gujarati thriller drama film, directed and written by Harshil Bhatt. It stars Yash Soni, Chetan Daiya, and Riddhi Yadav. The film was produced by Nilay Chotai, Dipen Patel, and Krishnadev Yagnik. It was co-produced by Purvin Patel and Mit Chotail, and it was distributed by Rupam Entertainment.

== Plot ==
When a 12-year-old boy goes missing on his way to school, things don't seem what they appear to police sub-inspector Jagat Pandya. As he digs deeper, the one thing he has to keep is his patience. A tiny detail leads him to the sinister truth he wasn't prepared for.

== Cast ==
- Yash Soni as Jagat Pandya
- Chetan Daiya as Bhavik Vyas
- Riddhi Yadav
- Kabir Daiya as Ayush Shukla
- Hitu Kanodia

== Production ==
The film was shot at various locations in Ahmedabad, Gujarat.

== Release ==
The trailer of the film was released on 9 April 2024. A teaser of the film was previously released on 26 March 2024.

== See also ==
- List of Gujarati films of 2024
