= Missing (2018 film) =

- Theatrical release poster
- Directed by: Mukul Abhyankar
- Written by: Mukul Abhyankar
- Produced by: Shital Bhatia; Shabana Raza Bajpayee; Manoj Bajpayee; Neeraj Pandey; Vikram Malhotra; Anand Pandit; Markand Adhikari
- Starring: Tabu; Manoj Bajpayee; Annu Kapoor
- Cinematography: Sudeep Chatterjee
- Edited by: Shree Narayan Singh
- Music by: M. M. Kreem
- Production companies: Sri Adhikari Brothers; Anand Pandit Motion Pictures; Manoj Bajpayee Productions; Friday Filmworks
- Distributed by: Abundantia Entertainment; Friday Filmworks
- Release date: 6 April 2018
- Running time: 120 minutes
- Country: India
- Language: Hindi
- Box office: ₹0.85 crore

Missing is a 2018 Indian Hindi-language psychological thriller film written and directed by Mukul Abhyankar. It is produced by Shital Bhatia, Shabana Raza Bajpayee, Vikram Malhotra, Markand Adhikari, Anand Pandit and Roopa Pandit, and stars Tabu, Manoj Bajpayee and Annu Kapoor. It has also been referred to as murder mystery. It was released on 6 April 2018.

Missing marks the directorial debut of Mukul Abhyankar. Along with acting in it, Bajpayee also co-produced the film under his eponymous film production banner, which is also the banner's first co-produced film. Last seen in Ghaath, Bajpayee and Tabu are reunited in this film after eighteen years. Annu Kapoor learnt French for the character of a Mauritian cop he played in the film.

== Plot ==
The film opens with Sushant Dubey preparing to go for a business trip. He arrives at a resort in Mauritius with his wife Aparna and their 3-year-old daughter Titli. Sushant persuades the resort's receptionist Naina to upgrade his single room to a double room. They settle in after a while and Sushant and Aparna make love. The man in the room below is shown to be creeping about and peeping into rooms. When Titli goes missing in the middle of the night, this man is shown to be the main suspect.

It is revealed that Sushant and Aparna are not married to each other. They met on the ferry to Mauritius. Sushant is in an unhappy marriage and Aparna is divorced. They talk and bond and Sushant invites Aparna to spend the next couple days with him. That is how they came to the resort. When Titli suddenly goes missing Aparna throws a fit. Sushant does not want their liaison to become public and the resort manager does not want to invite police scrutiny upon the resort. They try their best to find Titli but their efforts to contain the situation are foiled when Aparna calls the police.

Police inspector Buddhu begins the investigation. The CCTV footage first points to the creepy neighbor who has since checked out of the hotel. Over the protests of the resort manager the photograph of the neighbor is flashed on television and he is soon spotted about town with a little girl. When he is hauled in, Aparna finds that the girl is not Titli, and the man reveals that the girl is his own daughter. His ex-wife now has custody and the man visits the daughter once a month.

Buddhu calls in a sketch artist who draws two sketches based on the descriptions given, separately, by Aparna and Sushant. The sketches turn out to be completely different. Under intense grilling, Sushant discloses that Aparna could not bear children and the strain led to a mental breakdown. Titli is a hallucination, a figment of Aparna's imagination. Later in his room, Sushant tells Aparna that he cannot carry on the charade any more. Sushant later confesses to Buddhu that he and Aparna are not married and that they merely had an affair at the resort. He did not see Titli's face.

Back in his room, Sushant tells Aparna that he has kidnapped Titli at the behest of his friend who is Aparna's ex-husband. He threatens Aparna and rushes her out of the resort. Significantly, it is not shown how they managed to pass the front desk with three pieces of heavy luggage, and that too, when hotel staff, including hotel manager had already been accused of severe lapses by Inspector Buddhu. As they run through the forest, Aparna stops for a breath and asks for Titli. Sushant reveals that he did not know or kidnap Titli. Aparna now reveals that he was right. There was no 3-year-old but Titli does exist.

An old man arrives at the resort and asks after his daughter Titli. Buddhu is puzzled. The old man shows a photograph of Titli, who turns out to be Aparna. It is revealed that she is a dangerous mental patient who managed to escape from an asylum. As the old man, Titli's natural father, reveals the story of how Titli ended up in the asylum, the film ends as the deranged Titli attacks and kills Sushant with a meat cleaver in the middle of the forest.

== Cast ==
- Tabu as Aparna Dubey
- Manoj Bajpayee as Sushant Dubey a.k.a. Mr. Dubey
- Annu Kapoor as Ramkhilawan Buddhu, a tough natured Mauritius Police Investigation Officer.
- Priyanka Setia as Naina, a night shift receptionist
- Sunny Hawlader as Ontik
- Shruti Chandana as Shruti, a day shift receptionist
- Naveen Kaushik as Shankar, a hotel Manager
- Rajesh Jais as Ganga Narayan
- Kali Prasad Mukherjee as a mysterious guest in the hotel
- Sudeep Sarangi as a bellboy at the hotel
- V.M. Badola as Titli's father
- Manik Jha as the cruise captain

== Promotion ==
The Film's release date was kept a secret as long as possible to reduce media interaction as the film makers feared plot revelations. The trailer was released by John Abraham.

== Music ==
The film contained only one song. It is a lullaby, called "So Ja Re", and is composed by M. M. Keeravani. The lyrics are penned by Manoj Muntashir and it is sung by Tabu herself. On the screen, Tabu sings this lullaby to put her daughter to sleep.

== Critical reception ==
Rachit Gupta of The Times of India criticized the acting performances along with the direction of the film and gave it a rating of 2 out of 5 calling it a "half-baked thriller". Saibal Chatterjee of NDTV called Missing a "flawed film" and gave it a rating of 3 out of 5 saying that the only reason to watch this film is provided by the commendable acting performances of Tabu and Manoj Bajpayee. Rohit Vats of Hindustan Times gave the film a rating of 2 out of 5 and said that the movie doesn't make a great impact as a thriller but Tabu and Manoj Bajpayee have given noteworthy performances. Shubhra Gupta of The Indian Express criticized the film calling it a "shoddy mess" and gave it a rating of 0.5 out of 5. Shrishti Negi of News18 appreciated the performances of Tabu, Manoj Bajpayee and Annu Kapoor but criticized the film for its inconsistent screenplay which she felt was filled with loopholes and gave it a rating of 2 out of 5.

== Box office ==
Missing collected only ₹76 lakhs on its first week of release.
