= Shu Thayu? =

- Theatrical release poster
- Directed by: Krishnadev Yagnik
- Screenplay by: Krishnadev Yagnik
- Story by: Balaji Tharaneetharan
- Produced by: Mahesh Danannavar; Akshay Bhagwanji; Vaishal Shah
- Starring: Malhar Thakar; Yash Soni; Mayur Chauhan; Mitra Gadhvi; Aarjav Trivedi; Kinjal Rajpriya
- Edited by: Nirav Panchal
- Music by: Rahul Munjariya
- Production company: Belvedere Films
- Release date: 24 August 2018
- Running time: 131 minutes
- Country: India
- Language: Gujarati
- Box office: ₹21 crore (US$2.2 million)

Shu Thayu? (transl. What Happened?) is a 2018 Indian Gujarati-language comedy film written and directed by Krishnadev Yagnik and produced by Mahesh Danannavar, the founder of MD Media Corp & Vaishal Shah. It stars Malhar Thakar, Yash Soni, Mayur Chauhan, Mitra Gadhavi, Aarjav Trivedi, and Kinjal Rajpriya. The score was composed by Kedar-Bhargav and Rahul Munjariya. The film is a remake of the Tamil film Naduvula Konjam Pakkatha Kaanom (2012).

== Plot ==
Manan was fully prepared to tie the knot with his beloved, Dipali. However, a mishap just before the momentous occasion left him with amnesia, causing him to forget every detail about the impending wedding.

== Cast ==
- Malhar Thakar as Manan
- Yash Soni as Neel
- Mitra Gadhavi as Chirag
- Aarjav Trivedi as Viral
- Kinjal Rajpriya as Deepali
- Netri Trivedi as Chaitali
- Mayur Chauhan as Barber
- Rahul Rawal as Chaitali's Husband
- Jay Bhatt as Doctor
- Prashant Barot as Deepali's Father

== Production ==
The film was shot over 32 days in 28 different locations.

== Release ==
The film was released on 24 August 2018 in 212 different locations.

== Reception ==
=== Critical reception ===
The Times of India rated the movie 3.5 out of 5 stars and said, "The movie retains its fun factor so well that it is a must-watch for all Malhar Thakar fans. Go, watch this Chhello Divas cast recreate the magic in a totally different story!"

=== Box office ===
The film earned ₹5.11 crores on its first weekend. In 11 days, the film earned ₹15.46 crores to become one of the highest earning Gujarati films of all time. The film earned total ₹21 crores in its theatrical run.

== See also ==
- List of Gujarati films of 2018
- List of highest-grossing Gujarati films
