= Hun Iqbal =

2023 Gujarati Film

- Official poster
- Directed by: Pallav Parikh
- Written by: Pallav Parikh
- Produced by: Dhaval Pandya
- Starring: Mitra Gadhavi; RJ Devaki; Nirav Vaidya; Sonali Lele Desai; Ravi Ranjan
- Cinematography: Bhaveshkummar
- Edited by: Bhagyashri V Thakur
- Music by: Darshan Shah
- Release date: 3 February 2023
- Running time: 135 minutes
- Country: India
- Language: Gujarati

Hun Iqbal is a 2023 Gujarati suspense thriller film written and directed by Pallav Parikh. It stars Mitra Gadhavi, RJ Devaki, Nirav Vaidya, Sonali Lele Desai and Ravi Ranjan.

== Plot ==
Iqbal, a flamboyant and mysterious thief, achieves a complicated heist.The police department tries to catch him.

== Cast ==
- Mitra Gadhavi
- RJ Devaki
- Nirav Vaidya
- Sonali Lele Desai
- Ravi Ranjan

== Soundtrack ==
Hun Iqbal

Soundtrack album by Darshan Shah
- Released: 20 January 2023
- Genre: Feature film soundtrack
- Language: Gujarati
- Label: Shemaroo Entertainment Limited

=== Tracklist ===
All lyrics are written by Thaakur; all music is composed by Darshan Shah.

Track listing
No.	Title	Lyrics	Music	Singer(s)	Length
1.	"Kirdaar"	Thaakur	Darshan Shah	Tshering Bhutia	2:02
2.	"Ae Dard"	Thaakur	Darshan Shah	Swati Minaxi	1:49
3.	"Aino"	Thaakur	Darshan Shah	Meet Rao	1:53
4.	"Ailaan Che"	Thaakur	Darshan Shah	Paulie Thomas, Meet Rao	2:14
5.	"Khanjar"	Thaakur	Darshan Shah	Moushumi Das, Abhishek Soni	1:55
6.	"Lanka Punchh Ni Pacchad"	Thaakur	Darshan Shah	Abhishek Soni	1:16
7.	"Man kabootar"	Thaakur	Darshan Shah	Tathya	1:45
8.	"Fur Fur (Bonus Track)"	Thaakur	Darshan Shah	Tshering Bhutia	1:08

== Release ==
The film was theatrically released on 3 February 2023.

== Reception ==
The Times of India praised the film's plot. A later review in the same newspaper noted that the fact the film was a thriller "brought a refreshing change to the Gujarati film industry, which is typically known for its family dramas and comedies."

== Accolades ==
The film received 9 nominations at the 21st Transmedia Gujarati Awards.

== See also ==
- List of Gujarati films of 2023
