= Karsandas Pay & Use =

- Directed by: Krishnadev Yagnik
- Written by: Krishnadev Yagnik
- Produced by: Nilay Chotai; Vaishal Shah
- Starring: Mayur Chauhan; Deeksha Joshi; Hemang Shah
- Cinematography: Bibhu Das
- Edited by: Nirav Panchal
- Music by: Amar Mohile
- Production companies: Belvedere Films; Ananta Production
- Distributed by: Rupam Entertainment
- Release date: 19 May 2017
- Running time: 150 minutes
- Country: India
- Language: Gujarati
- Budget: est. ₹1.5 crore (US$160,000)
- Box office: ₹8 crore (US$840,000)

Karsandas Pay & Use is a 2017 Indian Gujarati-language romantic comedy film written and directed by Krishnadev Yagnik and produced by Nilay Chotai and Vaishal Shah. The film stars Mayur Chauhan, Deeksha Joshi and Hemang Shah in lead roles and was released on 19 May 2017.

== Plot ==
The protagonist of the film is Tilok, who runs and administers a pay and use a toilet with his younger brother Sundar. Tilok and Jaya happen to develop a love at first sight equation. Jaya (Deeksha Joshi) is the eldest daughter of Chinubha and Amba among their six children. Chinubha is an auto-rickshaw driver. Slowly and gradually Tilok and Jaya's romantic equation builds up and both of them discover without even saying, that how deep affection both of them have for each other. Jaya's father discovered their love and is reluctant to accept the relationship. He has an altercation with Tilok over this, and the whole society bashes up Tilok. Tilok then challenges Jaya's father and promises to prove his importance in the society within a month.

== Cast ==
- Mayur Chauhan as Tilok
- Deeksha Joshi as Jaya
- Hemang Shah as Sundar
- Jay Bhatt as Kaalubha

== Production ==
The film was shot in various locations in Ahmedabad and Vadodara.

== Release ==
The film was released on 19 May 2017 in 144 theatres of Gujarat and Mumbai. The film was later released in Australia.

== Soundtrack ==
Karsandas Pay & Use

Soundtrack album by Kedar & Bhargav
- Released: 5 May 2017
- Genre: Feature film soundtrack
- Language: Gujarati
- Label: Sangeet Music

The soundtrack of Karsandas Pay & Use consists of 3 songs composed by Kedar and Bhargav, the lyrics of which have been written by Bhargav Purohit.

Tracklist
No.	Title	Singer(s)	Length
1.	"Aai Jyo"	Nakash Aziz	03:57
2.	"Mane Kahi De"	Jigardan Gadhavi & Vrattini Purohi	04:14
3.	"Tane Love Karu"	Pravin Luni	02:22
Total length:			10:33

== Reception ==
=== Box office ===
The film grossed ₹4 crore and net earning was ₹2.23 crores in the first week. It rose to ₹2.48 crore the next day. It earned $14,579 from release in Australia. The film grossed over ₹8 crore in total.

=== Critical response ===
Abhimanyu Mishra of The Times of India rated it four out of five and praised its story and direction. Jayesh Adhyaru of DeshGujarat rated it 3/5 and noted "in spite of clichéd star-crossed love story, superb performances and an amazing eye for detailing entertain us."
