= Fakt Purusho Maate =

2024 film directed by Jay Bodas & Parth Trivedi

- Official Theatrical Poster
- Directed by: Jay Bodas; Parth Trivedi
- Written by: Jay Bodas and Yajuvendra Kotila; Parth Trivedi; Original Story: Prakash Gowda
- Produced by: Anand Pandit; Vaishal Shah
- Starring: Yash Soni; Darshan Jariwala; Mitra Gadhavi; Esha Kansara
- Cinematography: Suman Kumar Sahu
- Music by: Kedar- Bhargav
- Production company: Jannock Films
- Distributed by: Rupam Entertainment Pvt Ltd
- Release date: 23 August 2024
- Running time: 135.20 minutes
- Country: India
- Language: Gujarati

Fakt Purusho Mate (lit. 'For Men Only') is a 2024 Gujarati comedy drama film, directed and written by Jay Bodas & Parth Trivedi. It stars Amitabh Bachchan (in a special appearance), Yash Soni, Darshan Jariwala, Mitra Gadhavi, Esha Kansara and others. The film is produced by Anand Pandit and Vaishal Shah. Written and Directed by Jay Bodas.The film will be distributed by Rupam Entertainment Pvt Ltd.

== Plot ==
The story is set during the sacred 16 days of Shraadh (Kaagvas), Purshottam descends to earth from the afterlife to break his grandson Brijesh's marriage with his childhood love with all sorts of magic powers up his sleeve. All hells are going to break loose in this absurd comedy of errors, where a spirit pits itself against his grandchild—old, outdated principles vs. the current. The heart of this magical story aims to break the notions of generational patriarchy, and support gender equality.

== Cast ==
- Amitabh Bachchan as Prabhudas (special appearance)
- Yash Soni as Brijesh
- Darshan Jariwala as Purshottam
- Mitra Gadhavi as Kirtan
- Esha Kansara as Radhika
- Aarti Patel
- Anurag Prappana
- Hetal Modi
- Prem Gadhavi
- Tusharika Rajguru

== Production ==
The film was shot at various locations in Ahmedabad, Gujarat. The production design has been carried out by Chirayu Bodas. Costume has been taken care by Ameel Macwan. The song of the film and music has been given by Kedar and Bhargav.

The film was announced in May 2024. According to producer Anand Pandit, the film questions generational patriarchy and supports gender equality. It is a sequel to the 2022 film Fakt Mahilao Maate.

== Soundtrack ==
Fakt Purusho Maate

Soundtrack album by Kedar and Bhargav
- Released: 2024
- Genre: Feature film soundtrack
- Length: 6:00
- Language: Gujarati

All lyrics are written by Bhargav Purohit; all music is composed by Kedar and Bhargav.

Track listing
No.	Title	Singer(s)	Length
1.	"Jadu Jadu"	Shaan (singer)	3:15
2.	"Fakt Purusho Maate - Title Track"	Vishal Dadlani	2:45
Total length:			3:15

== Releases ==
The film release date announced with the video on April 29, 2024. The official poster released on July 7, 2024. The teaser of the film released on July 16, 2024. The film is set to hit the cinemas on 23 August 2024.

== Reception ==
=== Reviews ===
Kanksha Vasavada of The Times of India rated it 3.5 out of 5. She praised the performances, story and climax but criticised lengthy second half with predictable moments. Shilpa Bhanushali of Mid-Day Gujarati rated it 4 out of 5. She praised acting, music, dialogues, cinematography but criticised length and predictability of story.

=== Box-office ===
The film opened at ₹ 45 lakhs on its first day. It performed well on its opening weekend and saw a significant increase in collection on the first Sunday due to the Janmashtami holiday and went on to collect ₹ 1.65 crores. The film grossed ₹ 5 crores in its opening week. After the end of second week, it grossed ₹ 7.28 crore.

== See also ==
- List of Gujarati films of 2024
