= Deeksha Joshi =

Indian actress

- Education: St. Xavier's College, Ahmedabad
- Occupation: Actress
- Years active: 2017–present

Deeksha Joshi is an Indian actress from Gujarat who primarily works in the Gujarati film industry. She made her acting debut in 2017 with the film Shubh Aarambh, followed by Karsandas Pay & Use (2017), Sharato Lagu (2018), Dhunki (2019).

== Early life ==
She studied English Literature from St. Xavier's College, Ahmedabad.

== Career ==
Deeksha made her debut with the movie Shubh Aarambh, directed by Amit Barot in 2017. She then starred in other two movies Karsandas Pay & Use and Colorbaaj in the same year.

Her next project was Sharato Lagu alongside Malhar Thakkar. She won the "GIFA best actress of the year" in 2018 for her role in Sharato Lagu. Her next venture was Dhunki starring with Pratik Gandhi which was acclaimed critically.

In 2020, Deeksha received the "Critics' Choice Film Awards Best Actress (Gujarati)" for Dhunki. Deeksha did the titular role in the romantic comedy film Luv Ni Love Storys directed by Durgesh Tanna which was also released in 2020.

She made her Bollywood debut in the Ranveer Singh starrer Jayeshbhai Jordaar directed by Divyang Thakkar.

She will be also seen in Chandresh Bhatt's untitled project opposite Esha Kansara and Gaurav Paswala.

Sonce December 2025, Joshi makes her Hindi TV Debut with SAB TV's Pushpa Impossible where she replaced Garima Parihar as Deepti "Deepu" Parikh Patel.

== Filmography ==
=== Film ===
Key
Denotes film(s) that have not yet been released

Year	Title	Role	Director	Language	Notes
2017	Shubh Aarambh	Riddhima	Amit Barot	Gujarati	Debut film
2017	Karsandas Pay & Use	Jaya	Krishnadev Yagnik	Gujarati	
2017	Colorbaaj	Tanvi	Zanane Rajsingh	Gujarati	
2018	Sharato Lagu	Savitri	Neeraj Joshi	Gujarati	
2019	Dhunki	Shreya	Anish Shah	Gujarati	
2020	Luv Ni Love Storys	Preeti	Durgesh Tanna	Gujarati	
2020	376 D	Sandhya	Gunveen Kaur & Robin Sikarwar	Hindi	Debut In Bollywood
2022	Prem Prakaran		Chandresh Bhatt		
2022	Jayeshbhai Jordaar	Preeti	Divyang Thakkar	Hindi	
2022	Fakt Mahilao Maate	Sneha	Jay Bodas	Gujarati	
2022	Vaahlam Jaao Ne	Reena	Hardik Gajjar	Gujarati	
2023	Lakiro	Richa	Darshan Ashwin Trivedi	Gujarati	
2025	Kaashi Raaghav	Kaashi	Dhruv Goswami	Gujarati	
2025	Umbarro	Anwesha Sudhir	Abhishek Shah	Gujarati	
2025	Kaushaljis vs Kaushal	Yug's Sister	Seemaa Desai	Hindi	
2025	Dhadak 2	Nimisha	Shazia Iqbal	Hindi	
2025	Naankhatai			Gujarati	
2026	Maaran	Birwa	Abhishek Jain	Gujarati	

=== Television ===
Year	Title	Role	Language	Notes
2025-present	Pushpa Impossible	Deepti Parikh Patel	Hindi	

== Awards ==
Year	Award	Category	Nominated work	Result	Ref.
2018	Gujarati Iconic Film Awards (GIFA)	Best Actress	Sharato Lagu	Won	
