= Danny Jigar =

2024 Indian Gujarati parody film

- Official Poster
- Directed by: Krishnadev Yagnik
- Written by: Krishnadev Yagnik; Jaswant Parmar
- Produced by: Nikunj Patel; Dipen Patel
- Starring: Yash Soni; Tarjanee Bhadla; Jitendra Thakkar; Chetan Daiya; Prem Gadhavi; Rahul Raval; Hetal Puniwala; Rajan Thakar; Om Bhatt
- Cinematography: Pratik Parmar
- Edited by: Shivam Bhatt
- Music by: Kedar and Bhargav
- Production company: Big Box Series
- Distributed by: Rupam Entertainment Pvt. Ltd.
- Release date: 5 January 2024
- Country: India
- Language: Gujarati

Danny Jigar is a 2024 Indian Gujarati action comedy spoof film directed and written by Krishnadev Yagnik, and co-written by Jaswant Parmar. The film was produced by Nilay Chotai and Dipen Patel. It stars Yash Soni, Tarjanee Bhadla, Jitendra Thakkar, and Chetan Daiya. It was released on 5 January 2024.

== Plot ==
A stylish supercop Danny Jigar takes on the challenge of recovering a stolen 600-year-old statue. With his unmatched style and quick-witted humor, Danny Jigar showcases his intelligence while solving the case in an only way possible.

== Cast ==
- Yash Soni as Danny Jigar
- Tarjanee Bhadla as Pooja
- Jitendra Thakkar as K Kaali
- Chetan Daiya as R S Jhony
- Prem Gadhavi as Sunil
- Rahul Raval as Pratap
- Hetal Puniwala as Raka
- Rajan Thakar as Albelo
- Om Bhatt as Bunty

== Production ==
On 16 November 2022, director Krishnadev Yagnik announced the film and revealed the first picture from the set featuring Yash Soni as Danny Jigar on his social media profile. On 27 June 2023, Yash Soni completed the dubbing of the film.

== Marketing and release ==
The first look was revealed on 1 August 2023, and the teaser of the film was released on 28 August 2023. The film was initially scheduled to be released in the theaters on 8 December 2023, however, it was delayed, and it subsequently released in theaters on 5 January 2024.

== Reception ==
The film had poor theatrical run and received negative reviews.

Rachna Joshi of Mid-Day Gujarati rated it 2.5 out of 5. She praised performances and cinematography but criticised story and dialogues. She commended the attempt at the first Gujarati "spoof film". Chetansingh Chauhan of NewzDaddy rated it 5 out of 10. He praised the performances and direction while criticised the screenplay, VFX, background score and story.
