= Asambhauuu =

2026 Indian Gujarati drama film

- Official Poster
- Directed by: Parth Trivedi
- Written by: Parth Trivedi
- Produced by: Anand Pandit; Vaishal Shah
- Starring: Mitra Gadhavi; Raunaq Kamdar; Shiwani Bhardwaj; Tatsat Munshi; Chetan Daiya
- Cinematography: Mihir Fichadiya
- Edited by: Parth Jaykumar Vyas
- Music by: Kedar Upadhyay; Bhargav Purohit
- Production companies: Anand Pandit Motion Pictures; Jannock Films
- Distributed by: Rupam Entertainment
- Release date: 4 September 2026
- Running time: 149 minutes
- Country: India
- Language: Gujarati

Asambhauuu (Gujarati: અસંભાઉઉઉ ) is a 2026 Indian Gujarati drama film directed and written by Parth Trivedi. It stars Mitra Gadhavi, Raunaq Kamdar, Shiwani Bhardwaj, Tatsat Munshi, Chetan Daiya and others. The film is produced by Anand Pandit from Anand Pandit Motion Pictures and Vaishal Shah from Jannock Films. The film was released in theaters on 4 September 2026.

== Plot ==
The story is a metaphor for Yudhishthira and the dog, and explores the idea of dharma. Chintu, a dog, loves his owner, Chintan, like a brother. Chintan, too, loves him with all his heart. When fate puts their love and loyalty to the test, they go to extraordinary lengths to fight for each other.

== Cast ==
- Mitra Gadhavi as Bro
- Raunaq Kamdar as Chintan
- Shiwani Bhardwaj as Kavya
- Tatsat Munshi as Jimmy
- Chetan Daiya as Yamraj
- Premal Yagnik
- Hetal Mody
- Jitendra Thakkar
- Tusharika Rajyaguru
- Jassi Gadhavi
- Princy Prajapati

== Soundtrack ==
Asambhauuu

Soundtrack album
- Released: 2026
- Genre: Feature film soundtrack
- Length: 13:15
- Language: Gujarati
- Label: Big Box Series
External audio
- Asambhauuu Full Album on JioSaavn

=== Track listing ===
All lyrics are written by Bhargav Purohit; all music is composed by Kedar Upadhyay, Bhargav Purohit

Track listing
No.	Title	Lyrics	Music	Singer(s)	Length
1.	"Bhau Bhau"	Bhargav Purohit	Kedar Upadhyay, Bhargav Purohit	Raunaq Kamdar, Mitra Gadhavi, Kedar Upadhyay, Bhargav Purohit, Margey Raval	2:33
2.	"O Mara Bheru"	Bhargav Purohit	Kedar Upadhyay, Bhargav Purohit	Jigardan Gadhavi	3:50
3.	"Pachho Aai Gyo"	Bhargav Purohit	Kedar Upadhyay, Bhargav Purohit	Jigardan Gadhavi	2:36
4.	"Jee Re Jee Re"	Bhargav Purohit	Kedar Upadhyay, Bhargav Purohit	Siddharth Amit Bhavsar	4:56
Total length:					13:15

== Release ==
The film was announced on 10 April 2026. The teaser was released on 29 July 2026. The trailer was released on 13 August 2026 through social media platforms and YouTube.This film was released in theaters on 4 September 2026.

== See also ==
- List of Gujarati films of 2026
- List of Gujarati films
