= Udan Chhoo =

2024 film directed by Anish Shah

- Official Poster
- Directed by: Anish Shah
- Written by: Ankit Gor; Anish Shah; Parth Trivedi; Abhinav Vaidya
- Produced by: Raahul Badal; Anish Shah; Jay Shah
- Starring: Deven Bhojani; Prachee Shah Paandya; Aarohi Patel; Aarjav Trivedi
- Cinematography: Sree Kumar Nair
- Edited by: ParthBittu Patel
- Music by: Siddharth Amit Bhavsar
- Production companies: Indira Motion Pictures; November Films
- Distributed by: Rupam Entertainment Pvt Ltd
- Release date: 6 September 2024
- Running time: 135 minutes
- Country: India
- Language: Gujarati

Udan Chhoo is a 2024 Gujarati comedy drama film directed by Anish Shah and written by Ankit Gor, Anish Shah, Parth Trivedi and Abhinav Vaidya. It stars Deven Bhojani, Prachee Shah Paandya, Aarohi Patel, Aarjav Trivedi in lead roles. It is produced by Raahul Badal, Anish Shah and Jay Shah, under the banner of Indira Motion Pictures and November Films. It was released on 6 September 2024.

== Plot ==
The middle-aged inlaws in love with each other elope from their children's wedding.

== Cast ==
The cast include:

- Deven Bhojani
- Prachee Shah Paandya
- Aarohi Patel
- Aarjav Trivedi
- Alisha Prajapati
- Naman Gor
- Jay Upadhyay
- Feroz Bhagat
- Smit Joshi
- Pratik Sharma
- Shruhad Goswami
- Sohni Bhatt

== Production ==
The film was shot at various locations in Ahmedabad, Gujarat. The production design was carried out by Shoumini Ghosh Roy. Niki Joshi designed the costumes. The music is composed by Siddharth Amit Bhavsar and lyrics are written by Bhargav Purohit.

The film seem to take an inspiration from an incident happened in Surat in 2022 in which in-laws had eloped.

Deven Bhojani made debut in Gujarati cinema with the film while it was the second Gujarati film of Prachee Shah Pandya.

== Soundtrack ==
Udan Chhoo

Soundtrack album by Siddharth Amit Bhavsar
- Released: 2024
- Genre: Feature film soundtrack
- Length: 7:31
- Language: Gujarati
- Label: warner Music Group

All lyrics are written by Bhargav Purohit; all music is composed by Siddharth Amit Bhavsar.

Track listing
| No. | Title | Singer(s) | Length |
|---|---|---|---|
| 1. | "Antar Mann" | Siddharth Amit Bhavsar & Madhubanti Bagchi | 3:04 |
| 2. | "Thodi Yaad" | Vishal Mishra (composer) | 4:21 |
| Total length: | | | 7:31 |

== Releases ==
The film release date announced on 3 April 2024. The official poster released on 29 July 2024. The teaser of the film released on August 6, 2024. It was set released on 6 September 2024.

== Reception ==
Rama Shanker of CurrentSerials notes box office collection of ₹1.09 crore (US$110,000) in the first 6 days.

Kanksha Vasavada of The Times of India rated it 4 out of 5. She praised direction, script, dialogues, performances and score. VTV Gujarati praised the script, performances and complexities in comedy and story.

== See also ==
- List of Gujarati films of 2024
