= Yash Soni =

Indian theater and film actor (born 1996)

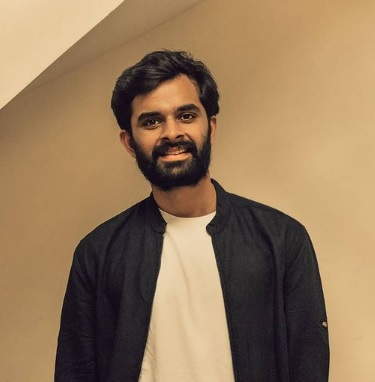
- Born: 16 October 1996 (age 29); Mumbai, Maharashtra, India
- Occupation: Actor
- Years active: 2015–present

Yash Soni (born 16 October 1996) is an Indian theater and film actor who primarily works in Gujarati cinema. He debuted with the hit comedy Chhello Divas (2015). He later starred in films like Days of Tafree (2016), Shu Thayu? (2018). He then starred in Chaal Jeevi Laiye! (2019) alongside Siddharth Randeria, which became the highest grossing Gujarati film.

== Career ==
Soni debuted in Gujarati cinema in 2015 with Chhello Divas directed by Krishnadev Yagnik which was declared a hit, and he was praised for his performance. Later he acted in some experimental and commercial theatre productions.

In 2016, he debuted in Bollywood (Hindi cinema) with Days of Tafree, the Hindi remake of Chhello Divas, directed by Yagnik. He again collaborated with Yagnik in another commercially successful Gujarati film Shu Thayu? (2018). In 2019, he starred in Chaal Jeevi Laiye! in the lead role which became the highest grossing Gujarati film. In 2022, he appeared in Naadi Dosh and Raado, both Gujarati films written and directed by Krishnadev Yagnik; and in Fakt Mahilao Maate directed by Jay Bodas. In 2023, he appeared in the hit comedy 3 Ekka with Malhar Thakar and Mitra Gadhavi. He will be seen in the upcoming masala film Danny Jigar.

== Filmography ==
=== Films ===
Key
†	Denotes films that have not yet been released

Year	Title	Role	Language	Notes
2015	Chhello Divas	Nikhil	Gujarati	
2016	Days of Tafree	Nikhil	Hindi	Remake of Chhello Divas
2018	Shu Thayu?	Neel	Gujarati	
2019	Chaal Jeevi Laiye	Aditya Parikh	Gujarati	
2022	Naadi Dosh	Kevin	Gujarati	
2022	Raado	Karan	Gujarati	
2022	Fakt Mahilao Maate	Chintan Parikh	Gujarati	
2023	3 Ekka	Kabir/Baba	Gujarati	
2024	Danny Jigar	Danny Jigar	Gujarati	
2024	Jagat	Jagat Pandya	Gujarati	
2024	Fakt Purusho Maate	Brijesh	Gujarati	
2025	Mithada Maheman	Aditya	Gujarati	
2025	Chaniya Toli	Prakash Mistry	Gujarati	
2026	Maaran	Ratan	Gujarati	

=== Theatre ===
Year	Title	Role
2019	Tran Aadi Liti	Hemang
