= Vash Level 2 =

2025 film directed by Krishnadev Yagnik

- Official Poster
- Directed by: Krishnadev Yagnik
- Written by: Krishnadev Yagnik
- Produced by: Kalpesh Soni; Krunal Soni
- Starring: Janki Bodiwala; Hitu Kanodia; Hiten Kumar; Monal Gajjar
- Cinematography: Prashant Gohel; Haresh S. Bhanushali
- Edited by: Shivam Bhatt
- Music by: Andrew Samuel
- Production companies: K S Entertainment Studios; Ananta Businesscorp; Patel Processing Studios; Big Box Series Pvt Ltd
- Distributed by: Panorama Studios
- Release date: 27 August 2025
- Running time: 103 minutes
- Country: India
- Language: Gujarati
- Box office: ₹16 crore

Vash: Level 2 is a 2025 Indian Gujarati-language supernatural psychological horror film written and directed by Krishnadev Yagnik. It is a sequel to 2023 film Vash. The film stars Janki Bodiwala, Hitu Kanodia, Monal Gajjar and Hiten Kumar in lead roles. It was released in theaters on 27 August 2025 along with its Hindi-dubbed version, titled Vash Vivash Level 2. The film, set 12 years after the events of the previous film, follows Atharva reluctantly coming out to fight again after a group of school girls are found in a violent puppet like control over them, with the assailant having a connection with Pratap, the black magician directly responsible for Aarya's current predicament.

== Plot ==
Twelve years after the events of Vash, Atharva continues to live with the trauma of his daughter Aarya's past possession. Although Aarya has grown into a young woman, she remains psychologically trapped, often unresponsive and withdrawn, as if the supernatural grip on her has never been fully released.

A new wave of terror begins when ten schoolgirls suddenly leap from the terrace of their school in unison. Several other girls behave violently and erratically, attacking strangers, vandalizing property, and setting vehicles on fire. The bizarre incidents are revealed to be the result of mass hypnosis orchestrated by Rajnath, the younger brother of black magician Pratap. Unlike his imprisoned sibling, Rajnath is free and seeks to establish his own power by manipulating children and sowing chaos in society.

Atharva is drawn back into conflict when he realizes that Rajnath's hypnosis has spread widely and that Aarya remains vulnerable. Rajnath's actions are tied to his obsession with reaching Pratap, who has been silenced and imprisoned with his tongue torn off, preventing him from chanting spells. Rajnath hopes to surpass his brother's dark legacy, but Atharva intervenes.

Atharva goes to the school where Rajnath has kept the girls under his control. He promises Rajnath that he will take him to his brother if he frees Aarya from the enchantment. Atharva, who has nothing to lose, is not scared of Rajnath's powers. Rajnath has to agree to Atharva's condition. Rajnath, Atharva and all the girls go to Atharva's farmhouse in 2 school buses.

In the climax, Rajnath understands that Aarya is still in enchantment due to a Rs.10 debt that Atharva has on Pratap. Atharva repays the money and Aarya gets freed from the enchantment. Rajnath finds out that Pratap's tongue is severed. Rajnath threatens to take Aarya with him and torture her. Atharva plays loud speakers so that no girl can hear Rajnath. Atharva incapacitates Rajnath and then tears off his tongue with a pair of pliers (as he did with Pratap), stripping him of the very power that enabled his hypnotic control.

The film closes on a somber note, with Atharva victorious and keeping Pratap and Rajnath both in his captivity to make them suffer without the mercy of death as long as he lives but deeply scarred by years of torment.

== Cast ==
- Janki Bodiwala as Aarya
- Hitu Kanodia as Atharva
- Hiten Kumar in a dual role:
  - as Pratap
  - Rajnath, brother of Pratap
- Monal Gajjar as Rashmika, girls' school principal
- Vishwa Rawal as Vidya
- Hency Bapat
- Chetan Daiya
- Prem Gadhavi

== Production ==
The film was shot at various locations in Ahmedabad, Gujarat.

== Release ==
=== Theatrical ===
The release date of the film was announced on 4 June 2025. It was theatrically released on 27 August 2025, including a Hindi-dubbed version.

=== Home media ===
The film began streaming on Netflix from 22 October 2025 in Gujarati and Hindi languages.

== Reception ==
=== Critical response ===
Vash Level 2 received mixed-to-positive reviews from critics.

India Today gave the film 3 out of 5 stars, describing it as "raw, chaotic and unsettling." The review highlighted the film's ambition in scale and bold visual horror, while noting that the second half falters with pacing issues and a rushed climax. Rahul Desai of The Hollywood Reporter wrote "The film-making in Vash Level 2 is slick without being distracting. It’s not the Bollywood genre slickness that tends to overproduce every scene."

Mayur Sanap of Rediff rated the film 2.5 stars out of 5 and wrote "Amidst the films that mistake great length for epic stature, Vash Level 2 keeps the pace well under two hours. And even though it doesn't deliver an absolute knock-out experience we would expect from a horror sequel, it has got enough zing to keep the franchise hurtling forward." Scroll.in described the film as "effective" for its shocks and nightmarish visuals, particularly in the first hour. However, the review also stated that the film delivered "diminishing returns," pointing out issues with the screenplay and narrative depth.

== See also ==
- List of Gujarati films of 2025
- List of Gujarati films
