= Jigardan Gadhavi =

Indian singer (b. 1991)

- Also known as: Jigrra
- Born: Jigardan Gadhavi; 29 June 1991 (age 35); Ahmedabad, India
- Genres: Folk; Rock; Pop; Dance
- Occupations: playback singer; songwriter; music director; performer; actor
- Instruments: Guitar; Harmonium
- Years active: 2014-present
- Labels: Zee Music Company, Krup Music; Red Ribbon Musik; Jigrra Production
- Spouse: Yati Upadhyay Gadhavi
- Website: www.jigardangadhavi.com

Jigardan Gadhavi (born 29 June 1991), also known as Jigrra, is an Indian playback singer, songwriter, performer, and music composer from Ahmedabad, India. He made his debut in Gujarati cinema with the film Hardik Abhinandan. He is best known for his works in the Gujarati cinema for the songs "Vhalam Aavo Ne" from the film Love Ni Bhavai, "Mane Kahi De" from the film Karsandas Pay & Use, "Chaand Ne Kaho" from the film Chaal Jeevi Laiye! and some of his single songs like Dhimo Varsad, Mogal Taro Aashro, and Mogal Aave. He has also composed music for the films Hardik Abhinandan, I Wish, and Lapet.

== Career ==
Jigrra received his bachelor's degree in Physiotherapy from the JG College of Physiotherapy in Ahmedabad. He began composing songs in primary school.

== Songs ==
| Film/Singles | Song | Singer | Lyricist | Music | Year of Release | Notes/Ref. |
|---|---|---|---|---|---|---|
| Single | "Vela Milan Ni" | Yes | Yes | Yes | 2021 | |
| Dhuandhaar | "Paane Paane" | Yes | Bhargav Purohit | Kedar - Bhargav | 2021 | |
| Bau Na Vichar | "Bau Na Vichaar Title" "Scheme Tu Paade Chhe" | Yes | Hrutul Patel | Hrutul Patel, Badal Soni, Kushal Chokshi | 2020 | |
| Kem Chho? | "Kahi De Tu Mane" | Yes | Milind Gadhavi | Rahul Prajapati | 2020 | |
| G | "Evu Pan Bane" | Yes | Akshay Dave | Rushik Patel, Abhyuday Chowdary | 2020 | |
| Single | "Odhaji" | Yes | Folk Song | Hrishikesh Gangan | 2019 | Published by Tips Gujarati |
| Single | "Mogal Tara Aangna Maa" | Yes | Milind Gadhavi | Yes | 2019 | |
| Single | "Rangtaali - 2" | Yes | Traditional Garba song | Maulik Mehta, Rahul Munjariya | 2019 | |
| Single | "Boom Padi Gayi" | Yes | Sumeet C. Khanwani | Mir Desai | 2019 | |
| Single | "Lagyo Kevo Rang Taro" | Yes | Pradip Prajapati, Prashant Patel | Vivian Richard | 2019 | |
| Single | "Aaja Re" | Yes | Yes | Yes | 2019 | |
| Single | "Tara Vagar" | Yes | Yes | Yes | 2019 | . |
| Dhunki | "Nazam Navi" | Yes | Niren Bhatt | Siddharth Amit Bhavsar | 2019 | |
| Chaal Jeevi Laiye! | "Chaand Ne Kaho" | Yes | Niren Bhatt | Sachin–Jigar | 2019 | |
| Lapet | "Lapet Title Track" "Yaara Ve" | Yes | Yes | Yes | 2019 | |
| Shu Thayu? | "Kaa Kaa Kaa" | Yes | Bhargav Purohit | Kedar - Bhargav | 2018 | |
| Pagalpanti | "Rehnuma" | Yes | Jakee Patel | Anwar Shaikh | 2018 | |
| Dhaakad | "Jani Lejo Re" | Yes | Niren Bhatt | Maulik Mehta | 2018 | |
| Single | Dhimo Varsad | Yes | Yes | Yes | 2018 | Feat. Aarohi Patel |
| Love Ni Bhavai | ''Vhalam Aavo Ne'' | Yes | Niren Bhatt | Sachin–Jigar | 2017 | Also sung Sad Virsion (Male) |
| Karsandas Pay & Use | "Mane Kahi De" | Yes | Bhargav Purohit | Kedar - Bhargav | 2017 | |
| Gujarati Wedding In Goa | "Chand Jevo Chehro" | Yes | Dashrath Mewal | Samir - Mana | 2017 | |
| Gujarati Wedding In Goa | ''Mali Nazar Jo Nazron Thi'' | Yes | Krupesh Thacker | Samir - Mana | 2017 | |
| Dhaakad | Jani Lejo Re | Yes | Niren Bhatt | Maulik Mehta | 2017 | |
| Hardik Abhinandan | All Songs | Yes | Dev Keshwala, Jigardan Gadhavi | Yes | 2016 | |
| Whisky Is Risky | "It's Time to Party" | Yes | Jigar Dave | Samir - Mana | 2014 | |
| Single | Pehli Baar | Yes | Yes | Yes | 2016 | Published by Zee Music Company |
| Single | Mogal Taro Aashro | Yes | Yes | Yes | 2017 | Feat. Kirtidan Gadhvi |
| Single | Tere Aane se | Yes | Yes | Yes | 2017 | |
| Single | Ek Andhari | Yes | Folk Song | Yes | 2016 | |
| Single | Mogal Aave | Yes | Shree kavi Daad | Yes | 2015 | |
| Single | Taadhkaro | Yes | Yes | Yes | 2015 | |
| Single | Aadhey Pal | Yes | Yes | Yes | 2014 | |
| BaagadBillaa | O Meherbaan | Yes | Maulin Parmar | Param Bhagat, Prajval Pandya, Vrushank Gurav | 2022 | |
| Ilu Ilu | Dheeme Dheeme | Yes | Bhavik Bhojak | Rutvij Joshi, Bhavik Bhojak | 2025 | |
| All The Best Pandya | Vaari Gayo | Yes | Bhargav Purohit | Prashant Satose | 2025 | |
| Mithada Maheman | Safar | Yes | Nandan Purohit | Rahul Munjariya | 2025 | |
| Jai Mata Ji - Let's Rock | Samajh Ma Na Aave | Yes | Bhargav Purohit | Parth Parekh | 2025 | |
| Vaanki Chuki Love Story | Kaajal Kali | Yes | Bhargav Purohit | Rahul Munjariya | 2026 | |
| Asambhauuu | O Mara Bheru | Yes | Bhargav Purohit | Kedar Upadhyay, Bhargav Purohit | 2026 | |
| Asambhauuu | Pachho Aai Gyo | Yes | Bhargav Purohit | Kedar Upadhyay, Bhargav Purohit | 2026 | |
| Ruff and Tuff Kanya | Ruff and Tuff Kanya Title Track | Yes | Ujjval Dave | Andrew Samuel | 2026 | |
