= Mayur Chauhan =

Indian actor

- Occupation: Actor
- Years active: 2014–present

Mayur Chauhan is an Indian actor known for his work in Gujarati cinema.

== Career ==
=== Theater ===
Mayur Chauhan has performed in several theater plays across different languages, including:

Theater Plays
Play	Language	Source
Kadak Badshahi	Gujarati	
Akoopar	Gujarati	
Vijali - The Musical	Gujarati	

== Filmography ==
Filmography
Title	Role	Year
Chhello Divas	Naresh	2015
Daav Thai Gayo Yaar		2016
Machchhu		2019
Karsandas Pay and Use	Tilok	2017
Saiyar Mori Re	Hari	2022
Samandar	Uday	2024
Haha Car	Hitu	2024
