= Krishnadev Yagnik =

Indian film director

- Born: 17 October 1984 (age 42)
- Other name: KD
- Occupations: Director, screenwriter, screenplay
- Years active: 2013–present
- Spouse: Twinkel Yagnik
- Website: www.bigboxseries.com

Krishnadev Yagnik (born 17 October 1984) is an Indian film director and screenwriter, known for his works primarily in Gujarati cinema. He is known for directing films such as Chhello Divas (2015), Karsandas Pay & Use (2017), and Shu Thayu? (2018). Shu Thayu? and Chhello Divas are among highest-grossing Gujarati films. In 2016 he has also directed the Hindi remake of his film Chhello Divas, titled Days of Tafree.

He co-founded the film production house called Belvedere Films, under which the films Shu Thayu?, Chhello Divas and Karsandas Pay & Use were produced. He wrote and directed Raado (2022), Naadi Dosh (2022), and Vash (2023), which are all Gujarati films.

== Career ==
Yagnik began his career as a guitarist in garba band. He moved to Bombay pursue the career as a composer. After early struggles, he got an opportunity as Jatin Pandit's assistant. However, unable to find further opportunities as a composer, he decided to direct his own movie. He learned screenwriting and direction from YouTube videos and tutorials. With his friend Vaishal Shah, he managed to fundraise money to direct his debut film, Chhello Divas, which turned out to be one of the highest-grossing Gujarati films of all-time, earning ₹18 crore (US$1.9 million).

Yagnik co-founded the production houses, Big Box Series and Belvedere Films.

== Filmography ==
Year	Film	Language	Director	Producer	Writer
2015	Chhello Divas	Gujarati	Yes	Yes	Yes
2016	Days of Tafree	Hindi	Yes	No	Yes
2017	Karsandas Pay and Use	Gujarati	Yes	Yes	Yes
2018	Shu Thayu?	Gujarati	Yes	Yes	Yes
2018	Vandha Villas	Gujarati	No	No	Yes
2022	Naadi Dosh	Gujarati	Yes	No	Yes
2022	Raado	Gujarati	Yes	No	Yes
2023	Vash	Gujarati	Yes	No	Yes
2024	Danny Jigar	Gujarati	Yes	No	Yes
2024	Kasoombo	Gujarati	No	Yes	No
2024	Shaitaan	Hindi	No	No	Yes
2024	Jagat	Gujarati	No	Yes	No
2024	Trisha On The Rocks	Gujarati	Yes	No	Yes
2025	Mithada Maheman	Gujarati	No	Yes	No
2025	Vash Level 2	Gujarati	Yes	No	Yes
2026	Ruff and Tuff Kanya	Gujarati	No	Yes	No
2027	Gol Dhana	Gujarati	No	Yes	No

== Awards ==
Krishnadev was awarded as the best director for the film Karsandas Pay & Use at International Gujarati Film Festival in 2018. Vash won National Film Award for Best Gujarati Feature Film at the 71st National Film Awards.

== See also ==
- List of Gujarati films
- List of Indian film directors
