= Days of Tafree =

2016 Hindi film written and directed by Krishnadev Yagnik

- Theatrical release poster
- Days of Tafree
- Directed by: Krishnadev Yagnik
- Written by: Krishnadev Yagnik
- Produced by: Anand Pandit; Rashmi Sharma; Pawan Kumar
- Starring: Yash Soni; Ansh Bagri; Sanchay Goswami; Nimisha Mehta; Kinjal Rajpriya; Sarabjeet Bindra; Anuradha Mukharjee; Mamta Chaudhary
- Music by: Sachin–Jigar
- Production companies: Anand Pandit Motion Pictures; Rashmi Sharma Telefilms
- Release date: 23 September 2016
- Country: India
- Language: Hindi

Days of Tafree (transl. Days of Recreation) is a 2016 Bollywood comedy film written and directed by Krishnadev Yagnik. Produced by Anand Pandit and Rashmi Sharma, it revolves around the lives of seven friends in college. It is an official remake of the 2015 Gujarati film, Chhello Divas.

Days of Tafree was released on 23 September 2016.

== Plot ==
The movie revolves around the lives of eight friends and their journey of growing up while they face the highs and lows of their relationships, love and romance, the end of their college days and the beginning of a new life.

== Cast ==
- Yash Soni as Nikhil
- Ansh Bagri as Vicky
- Sanchay Goswami as Suresh
- Nimisha Mehta as Pooja
- Kinjal Rajpriya as Nisha
- Sarabjeet Bindra as Dhula
- Anuradha Mukherjee as Isha
- Mamta Chaudhary as Vandana

== Reception ==
=== Box office ===
The film received poor response at the box office and earned ₹60 lakhs in the first weekend.

== Soundtrack ==
No.	Title	Singer(s)	Length
1.	"Jeetey Yeh Lamhe"	Anupam Amod, Amit Mishra
2.	"Main Hun Tu Ho"	Arijit Singh
3.	"Paarappa"	Anupam Amod
