= List of highest-grossing Indian films =

This ranking lists the highest-grossing Indian films produced by Indian cinema, based on conservative global box office estimates as reported by organisations classified as green by Wikipedia. (Note: See WP:RSP, WP:ICTFSOURCES) The figures are not adjusted for inflation. However, there is no official tracking of figures and sources publishing data are frequently pressured to increase their estimates.

== Overview ==
Indian films have been screened in markets around the world since the early 20th century. Since 2003, there are markets in over 90 countries where films from India are screened. During the first decade of the 21st century, there was a steady rise in the ticket price, a tripling in the number of theatres and an increase in the number of prints of a film being released, which led to a large increase in the box office collections.

As of 2014, Hindi cinema represents 43% of the net box office revenue in India, while Telugu and Tamil cinema represent 36%, and other industries constitute 21%. As of 2020, the combined revenue of all other language film industries has surpassed that of the Hindi film industry. By 2021, Telugu cinema became the largest film industry of India in terms of box-office. In 2023, the Hindi film industry accounted for 44% of box office revenue, followed by the Telugu industry at 19% and the Tamil industry at 16%. The Kannada (5%), Malayalam (3%), Bengali, Marathi, Odia, Punjabi, Gujarati and Bhojpuri industries contributed to the remainder, while the foreign film industry made up 9% of the total revenue. In 2024, the Hindi and the Telugu film industries accounted for 40% and 20% of the domestic gross box office revenue respectively, followed by Tamil with 15% share and Malayalam with 10% share.

== Key ==
Background shading indicates that a film, or at least one from a series, is currently showing in theatres worldwide.

== Highest-grossing films ==
The following table lists the top 50 highest-grossing Indian films worldwide.

Highest-grossing films
Rank	Title	Worldwide gross	Language	Year	Ref.
1	Dangal	₹1,968–2,054 crore	Hindi	2016	(Note: Dangal's reported worldwide grosses vary between ₹1968.03 crore (Bollywood Hungama) – ₹2,023.81 crore (Box Office India) – ₹2,054 (Box Office Mojo))
2	Dhurandhar: The Revenge	₹1,852.44 crore	Hindi	2026	
3	Baahubali 2: The Conclusion	₹1,810.60 crore	Telugu	2017	(Note: Baahubali 2: The Conclusion's reported worldwide gross – 1,810.60 crore (News18 and Box Office India))
4	Pushpa 2: The Rule	₹1,622–1,800 crore	Telugu	2024	(Note: Pushpa 2's reported worldwide grosses ₹1622 crore (Box Office India) and ₹1800 crore (The Hans India, Deccan Chronicle; The Indian Express))
5	Ramayana: Part 1	₹1,608.27 crore	Hindi	2026	
6	Dhurandhar	₹1,350.83 crore	Hindi	2025	
7	RRR	₹1,300–1,387 crore	Telugu	2022	(Note: RRR's reported worldwide grosses vary between ₹1,300 crore (News18 India, India Today, DNA) – ₹1,387 crore (NDTV India))
8	KGF: Chapter 2	₹1,200–1,250 crore	Kannada	2022	(Note: The New Indian Express and DNA India reported the worldwide collection to be around ₹1,200 crore to ₹1,216 crore, and The Hindustan Times mentioned the collection as ₹1,207 crore. News 18 and India Today mentioned that the collection was ₹1,240 crore. The Times Of India, Vijaya Karnataka, TV9 Kannada and Asianet News reported that the movie grossed ₹1250 crores.)
9	Jawan	₹1,148.32 crore	Hindi	2023	
10	Pathaan	₹1,050.30 crore	Hindi	2023	
11	Kalki 2898 AD	₹1,042–1,100 crore	Telugu	2024	(Note: Kalki 2898 AD's reported worldwide grosses vary between ₹1,042 (The Financial Express and India Today) –₹1,052.5 crore (ThePrint) –₹1,100 crore (Deccan Chronicle, Business Standard, Deccan Herald, Hindustan Times and The Statesman))
12	Animal	₹917.82 crore	Hindi	2023	
13	Bajrangi Bhaijaan	₹900.90–969.06 crore	Hindi	2015	(Note: Bajrangi Bhaijaan's reported worldwide grosses vary between ₹900.90 crore (Firstpost) – ₹918.18 crore (Bollywood Hungama) – ₹969 crore (India Today))
14	Stree 2	₹874.58 crore	Hindi	2024	
15	Secret Superstar	₹858.43–966 crore	Hindi	2017	(Note: Secret Superstar's reported worldwide grosses vary between ₹858.43(Box Office India) – ₹966 crore (India Today))
16	Kantara: Chapter 1	₹850–852 crore	Kannada	2025	(Note: Kantara: Chapter 1's reported worldwide grosses vary between ₹850 crore (Deccan Chronicle, Cinema Express, The New Indian Express, and DNA India) – ₹852 crore (Deccan Herald and News18))
17	Jailer 2	₹835 crore	Tamil	2026	
18	Chhaava	₹797.34–809 crore	Hindi	2025	(Note: Chhaava's reported worldwide grosses vary between ₹797.34 crore (Bollywood Hungama) – ₹800 crore (India Today) – ₹804.85 crore (The Economic Times) – ₹807.40 crore (DNA India) – ₹809 crore (Hindustan Times))
19	PK	₹769.89 crore	Hindi	2014	(Note: PK's reported worldwide grosses vary between ₹750.60 crore(Box Office India) – ₹769.89 crore (Bollywood Hungama))
20	2.0	₹699.89–800 crore	Tamil	2018	(Note: 2.0's reported worldwide grosses vary between ₹699.89 crore (Box Office India) – ₹800 crore (India Today))
21	Gadar 2	₹691.08 crore	Hindi	2023	
22	Sultan	₹615.71–623.33 crore	Hindi	2016	(Note: Sultan's reported worldwide grosses vary between ₹615.71 crore (Box Office India) – ₹623.33 crore (Firstpost))
23	Salaar: Part 1 – Ceasefire	₹614–702 crore	Telugu	2023	(Note: According to Box Office India Salaar: Part 1 – Ceasefire grossed around ₹612 crore worldwide and Hindustan Times reported ₹617 crore while India Today reported that the film grossed around ₹700 crore worldwide during its 2023 run. In July 2024, the film released in Japan, earning JPY 23 million (USD 142,000; ₹1.19 crore) in its initial days, bringing the adjusted worldwide total to approximately ₹614–702 crore.)
24	Jailer	₹605–650 crore	Tamil	2023	(Note: Jailer's reported worldwide grosses vary between ₹605 crore (India Today) – ₹650 crore (Firstpost))
25	Baahubali: The Beginning	₹599.72–650 crore	Telugu/Tamil	2015	(Note: Baahubali: The Beginning's reported worldwide grosses vary between ₹599.72 (Box Office India) – ₹600 crore (India Today and The Indian Express) – ₹650 (Firstpost))
26	Leo	₹595–615 crore	Tamil	2023	(Note: Leo's reported worldwide grosses vary between ₹595 crore (Box Office India) – ₹615 crore (Deccan Chronicle).)
27	Sanju	₹586.85 crore	Hindi	2018	
28	Saiyaara	₹579.23 crore	Hindi	2025	
29	Drishyam: The Conclusion	₹576.69 crore	Hindi	2026	
30	Tiger Zinda Hai	₹565.19 crore	Hindi	2017	
31	Padmaavat	₹563.55–571.98 crore	Hindi	2018	(Note: Padmaavat's reported worldwide grosses vary between ₹563.55 (Box Office India) – 571.98 crore (Bollywood Hungama))
32	Dhoom 3	₹556.74–558.42 crore	Hindi	2013	(Note: Dhoom 3's reported worldwide grosses vary between ₹556.74 crore (Bollywood Hungama) – ₹558.42 crore (Box Office India))
33	Coolie	₹514–675 crore	Tamil	2025	(Note: Coolie's reported worldwide grosses vary between ₹514 crore (The Hans India; Filmfare; Network18 Group) – ₹515 crore (OTTPlay) – ₹675 crore (The Indian Express; Zee News))
34	Ponniyin Selvan: I	₹500 crore	Tamil	2022	(Note: Ponniyin Selvan: I's reported worldwide gross is ₹500 crore according to Hindustan Times, Outlook India, News18, and The Economic Times.)
35	War	₹474.79–475.62 crore	Hindi	2019	(Note: War's reported worldwide grosses vary between ₹474.79 core (India Today – 475.62 crore (Bollywood Hungama))
36	Dunki	₹470.60 crore	Hindi	2023	
37	Tiger 3	₹466.63 crore	Hindi	2023	
38	Border 2	₹464.50 crore	Hindi	2026	
39	Andhadhun	₹444.48–456.89 crore	Hindi	2018	(Note: Andhadhun's reported worldwide grosses vary between ₹444.48 crore (Box Office India) – ₹456.89 crore (Bollywood Hungama))
40	Hanuman Ansh	₹442.58 crore	Hindi	2026	
41	The Greatest of All Time	₹440–460 crore	Tamil	2024	(Note: GOAT's reported worldwide grosses vary between ₹440 crore (Box Office India; The Hans India) – ₹452 crore (The Economic Times; NDTV) – ₹460 crore (Filmfare))
42	Saaho	₹434–439 crore	Telugu/Hindi	2019	(Note: Saaho's reported worldwide grosses vary between ₹434 crore (Deccan Herald) – ₹439 crore (India Today))
43	Vikram	₹424–500 crore	Tamil	2022	(Note: Vikram's reported worldwide grosses vary between ₹424 crore (Deccan Herald) – ₹435 crore (Bollywood Hungama) – ₹500 crore (Hindustan Times))
44	Bhool Bhulaiyaa 3	₹423.85 crore	Hindi	2024	
45	Brahmāstra: Part One – Shiva	₹418.80–430.77 crore	Hindi	2022	(Note: Brahmastra's reported worldwide grosses vary between ₹418.80 crore (Bollywood Hungama) – ₹431 crore (Box Office India, Hindustan Times and Zee News))
46	Kantara	₹400–450 crore	Kannada	2022	(Note: Kantara's reported worldwide grosses vary between ₹400 crore (Deccan Herald, India Today, Firstpost, DNA, News 18, The Economic Times, The Indian Express) – ₹450 crore (Hindustan Times, Outlook, The New Indian Express))
47	3 Idiots	₹400.61–460 crore	Hindi	2009	(Note: 3 Idiots's reported worldwide grosses vary between ₹397.08 crore (Box Office India) – ₹400.61 crore (Bollywood Hungama) – ₹460 crore (Hindustan Times))
48	Chennai Express	₹395.92–424.54 crore	Hindi	2013	(Note: Chennai Express's reported worldwide grosses vary between ₹395.92 crore (Box Office India) – ₹424.54 crore (Bollywood Hungama))
49	Krrish 3	₹393.37 crore	Hindi	2013	
50	Adipurush	₹392.70 crore	Hindi/Telugu	2023	(Note: Adipurush's reported worldwide gross is ₹392.70 crore according to Business Today, Deccan Chronicle, and News18.)

== Highest-grossing films by language ==
Cinema of West Bengal was the center of Indian cinema in the 1930s, and accounted for a quarter of India's film output in the 1950s. Cinema in South India accounted for nearly half of India's cinema halls in the 1940s.

=== Assamese ===
Assamese cinema is a part of Indian cinema, based in Assam, and is dedicated to the production of films in the Assamese-language. The following table lists the top 10 highest-grossing Assamese films produced in the Assamese film industry.

Rank	Title	Worldwide gross	Year	Ref.
1	Roi Roi Binale	₹42 crore	2025	(Note: NDTV | TV9 Bharatvarsh)
2	Bidurbhai	₹15.75 crore	2024	
3	Bhaimon Da	₹14.31 crore	2025	
4	Sri Raghupati	₹13.81 crore	2023	
5	Ratnakar	₹10 crore	2019	
5	Rudra	₹10 crore	2025	
7	Dr. Bezbaruah 2	₹7 crore	2023	
7	Kanchanjangha	₹7 crore	2019	
9	Mission China	₹6 crore	2017	
10	Malamal Boyyyz	₹5.17 crore	2025	

=== Bengali ===
Cinema of West Bengal, also known as Tollywood or Bengali cinema, is a part of Indian cinema. It is based in the Tollygunge region of Kolkata, West Bengal, and is dedicated to the production of films in the Bengali-language. The following table lists the top 10 highest-grossing Indian Bengali films.

Rank	Title	Worldwide gross	Year	Ref.
1	Amazon Obhijaan	₹48.63–50 crore	2017	(Note: Amazon Obhijaan's reported box office varies between ₹48.53 crore (The Statesman) – ₹50 crore (Hindustan Times and Indian Express))
2	Dhumketu	₹28.07 crore	2025	(Note: In India, including West Bengal, the net income is calculated by subtracting GST from the gross income of the film. The net income of the film is 23.79 crores, resulting in a gross income of almost 28.07 crores, including 18% GST.)
2	Chander Pahar	₹22.50 crore	2013	(Note: Original Release: ₹20 crore (The Statesman) - ₹21 crore (Indian Express); Final Collection after Re-release in 2024: ₹22.50 crore (Hindustan Times))
4	Bohurupi	₹21.24 crore	2024	(Note: In India, including West Bengal, the net income is calculated by subtracting GST from the gross income of the film. The net income of the film is 18 crores, resulting in a gross income of almost 21.24 crores, including 18% GST.)
5	Khadaan	₹20 crore	2024	
6	Projapoti	₹13 crore	2022	
7	Boss 2: Back to Rule (Note: The film was an India-Bangladesh joint production.)	₹10.50 crore	2017	
8	Pather Panchali	₹10 crore	1955	
9	Paglu	₹9.95 crore	2011	
10	Sathi	₹9.80 crore	2002	

=== Bhojpuri ===
Bhojpuri cinema is a part of Indian cinema, dedicated to the production of films in the Bhojpuri-language. Its major production centres are Lucknow and Patna. The following table lists the top 10 highest-grossing Bhojpuri films produced in the Bhojpuri film industry.

Rank	Title	Worldwide gross	Year	Ref.
1	Sasura Bada Paisawala	₹35 crore	2003	
2	Ganga	₹35 crore	2006	
3	Pratigya	₹22 crore	2008	
4	Border	₹19 crore	2018	
5	Nirahua Hindustani	₹14 crore	2014	
6	Mehandi Laga Ke Rakhna	₹14 crore	2017	

=== Gujarati ===
Gujarati cinema is a part of Indian cinema, dedicated to the production of films in the Gujarati-language. It is based in Ahmedabad and is sometimes referred to as Dhollywood. The following table lists the top 10 highest-grossing Gujarati films produced in the Gujarati film industry.

Rank	Title	Worldwide gross	Year	Ref.
1	Laalo – Krishna Sada Sahaayate	₹120 crore	2025	
2	Chaal Jeevi Laiye!	₹50 crore	2019	
3	3 Ekka	₹25 crore	2023	
3	Jhamkudi	₹25 crore	2024	
5	Chaniya Toli	₹23 crore	2025	
6	Desh Re Joya Dada Pardesh Joya	₹22 crore	1998	
7	Shu Thayu?	₹21 crore	2018	
8	Kehvatlal Parivar	₹17 crore	2022	
8	Umbarro	₹17 crore	2025	
10	Hellaro	₹16 crore	2019	
10	Vash Level 2	₹16 crore	2025	

=== Hindi ===
Hindi cinema is a part of Indian cinema based in Mumbai, Maharashtra. The films are made primarily in the Hindi-language. It is often known as Bollywood and is one of the largest film producers in India as well as a major centre of film production worldwide. The following table lists the top 10 highest-grossing Hindi films produced in the Hindi film industry.

Rank	Title	Worldwide gross	Year	Ref.
1	Dangal	₹1,968.03–2,054 crore	2016	
2	Dhurandhar: The Revenge	₹1,852.44 crore	2026	
3	Ramayana: Part 1	₹1,600 crore	2026	
4	Dhurandhar	₹1,350.83–1,428 crore	2025	
5	Jawan	₹1,148.32 crore	2023	
6	Pathaan	₹1,050.30 crore	2023	
7	Animal	₹917.82 crore	2023	
8	Bajrangi Bhaijaan	₹900.90–969.06 crore	2015	
9	Stree 2	₹874.58 crore	2024	(Note: Stree 2's reported worldwide grosses vary between ₹874.58 crore (Bollywood Hungama) – ₹875 crore (Hindustan Times))
10	Secret Superstar	₹858–966 crore	2017	

=== Kannada ===
Kannada cinema is a part of Indian cinema based in Gandhi Nagar, Bengaluru. The films are made primarily in Kannada-language. The following table lists the top 10 highest-grossing Kannada films produced in the Kannada film industry.

Rank	Title	Worldwide gross	Year	Ref.
1	KGF: Chapter 2	₹1,200–1,250 crore	2022	
2	Kantara: Chapter 1	₹850–852 crore	2025	
3	Kantara	₹400–450 crore	2022	
4	Toxic: A Fairy Tale for Grown-Ups	₹320–341.39 crore	2026	
(Note: There is no clear evidence of a primary language. The film's main languages are deemed to be Hindi, Kannada, Tamil and Telugu according to the Central Board of Film Certification)	Mahavatar Narsimha	₹300–325 crore	2025	(Note: Mahavatar Narsimha's reported worldwide grosses vary between ₹300 crore (Hindustan Times, Cinema Express, News18) – ₹324.5 crore (The Economic Times) – ₹325 crore (DNA India))
5	KGF: Chapter 1	₹250 crore	2018	
6	Vikrant Rona	₹159–210 crore	2022	(Note: Vikrant Rona's reported worldwide grosses vary between ₹159 crore (Hindustan Times) – ₹200 crore (DNA, India Today) – ₹210 crore (Telegraph))
7	Premada Oorali	₹154.32 crore	2026	
8	James	₹151 crore	2022	
9	Su From So	₹125 crore	2025	
10	777 Charlie	₹105–115 crore	2022	

=== Malayalam ===
Malayalam cinema, also referred to as Mollywood by certain media outlets, is a part of Indian cinema, based in Kerala and dedicated to the production of films in the Malayalam-language. The following table lists the top 10 highest-grossing Malayalam films produced in the Malayalam film industry.

Rank	Title	Worldwide gross	Year	Ref.
1	Bethlehem Kudumba Unit	₹331.09 crore	2026	
2	Lokah Chapter 1: Chandra	₹302–304 crore	2025	(Note: Lokah Chapter 1: Chandra's reported worldwide gross is from ₹301.98 crore (The Telegraph) to ₹302.5 crore (ThePrint) to ₹303.2 crore (The Week) to ₹304 crore (The Hollywood Reporter))
3	L2: Empuraan	₹265–268.05 crore	2025	(Note: The figure published by the makers of the film (₹325 crore) is the total business done by the film, and not the total box office collection. The total box office collection varies between ₹265 crore, ₹268 crore and ₹268.05 crore as per reliable sources listed at WP:ICTFSOURCES.)
4	Manjummel Boys	₹242.30 crore	2024	
5	Drishyam 3	₹238.61–239.20 crore	2026	
6	Vaazha II: Biopic of a Billion Bros	₹234–235 crore	2026	
7	Thudarum	₹233–235.30 crore	2025	(Note: Thudarum's reported worldwide grosses vary between ₹233 crore – ₹234.5 crore (The Indian Express) – ₹235.30 crore (Asianet News))
8	2018	₹177 crore	2023	
9	The Goat Life	₹158.50 crore	2024	
10	Aavesham	₹156 crore	2024	

=== Marathi ===
Marathi cinema is a part of Indian cinema, dedicated to the production of films in the Marathi-language and is based in Mumbai, Maharashtra. The following table lists the top 10 highest-grossing Marathi films produced in the Marathi film industry.

Rank	Title	Worldwide gross	Year	Ref.
1	Raja Shivaji (Note: The film was produced in Marathi and Hindi simultaneously.)	₹130 crore	2026	
2	Sairat	₹110 crore	2016	
3	Deool Band 2	₹100.50 crore	2026	
4	Baipan Bhaari Deva	₹92 crore	2023	
5	Sachin: A Billion Dreams (Note: The film was produced in Marathi, Hindi and English, according to the filmmakers.)	₹76.86 crore	2017	
6	Pawankhind	₹75 crore	2022	
6	Ved	₹75 crore	2022	
8	Natsamrat	₹48–50 crore	2016	(Note: Natsamrat's reported worldwide grosses vary between ₹48 crore (The Indian Express) – 50 crore (DNA India))
9	Lai Bhaari	₹40 crore	2014	
9	Katyar Kaljat Ghusali	₹40 crore	2015	

=== Meitei ===
Meitei cinema, also known as Maniwood, is a part of Indian cinema, dedicated to the production of films in Meitei language, officially known as Manipuri language, and is based in Imphal, the capital city of Manipur state of Northeast India. Boong became the first film in the industry, to cross the box office of 1 crore INR.

Title	Worldwide gross	Year	Ref.
Boong	₹1 crore	2025	

=== Odia ===
Odia cinema, also known as Ollywood, is a part of Indian cinema, dedicated to the production of films in the Odia-language, and is based in Bhubaneswar and Cuttack, Odisha. The first Odia film, Sita Bibaha, was released in 1936. The following table lists the top 10 highest-grossing Odia films produced in the Odia film industry.

Rank	Title	Worldwide gross	Year	Ref.
1	Bou Buttu Bhuta	₹21 crore	2025	
2	Daman	₹7.50 crore	2022	
3	Karma	₹6.50 crore	2024	
4	Balunga Toka	₹4 crore	2011	

=== Punjabi ===
Punjabi cinema is a part of Indian cinema, dedicated to the production of films in the Punjabi-language. It is based in Amritsar, Ludhiana and Mohali, Punjab. The following table lists the top 10 highest-grossing Punjabi films produced in the Punjabi film industry.

Rank	Title	Worldwide gross	Year	Ref.
1	Jatt & Juliet 3	₹110 crore	2024	
2	Carry on Jatta 3	₹91–100 crore	2023	(Note: Carry on Jatta 3's reported worldwide grosses vary between ₹91 crore (Box Office India) – ₹100 crore (Bollywood Hungama))
3	Mastaney	₹69 crore	2023	
4	Carry on Jatta 2	₹60 crore	2018	
5	Saunkan Saunkne	58 crore	2022	
6	Honsla Rakh	₹55 crore	2021	
7	Shadaa	₹54.50 crore	2019	
8	Chal Mera Putt 2	₹54 crore	2020	
9	Chaar Sahibzaade	₹50 crore	2014	
10	Sardaar Ji	₹45–50 crore	2015	(Note: Sardaar Ji's reported worldwide grosses vary between ₹45 crore (Box Office India) – ₹50 crore (The Tribune))

=== Tamil ===
Tamil cinema is a part of Indian cinema based in Chennai, Tamil Nadu. The films are made primarily in Tamil-language. The following table lists the top 10 highest-grossing Tamil films produced in the Tamil film industry.

Rank	Title	Worldwide gross	Year	Ref.
1	Jailer 2	₹835 crore	2026	
2	2.0	₹699.89–800 crore	2018	
3	Jailer	₹605–650 crore	2023	
4	Leo	₹595–615 crore	2023	
5	Coolie	₹514–675 crore	2025	
6	Ponniyin Selvan: I	₹500 crore	2022	
7	The Greatest of All Time	₹440–460 crore	2024	
8	Vikram	₹424–500 crore	2022	
9	Ponniyin Selvan: II	₹342–346 crore	2023	(Note: Ponniyin Selvan: II's reported worldwide grosses vary between ₹342 crore (Cinema Express) – ₹345 crore (News18) – ₹346 crore (DNA India))
10	Amaran	₹320–335 crore	2024	(Note: Amaran's reported worldwide grosses vary between ₹320 crore (India Today, Hindustan Times, Mint, and News18) – ₹335 crore (Moneycontrol and The Hans India))

=== Telugu ===
Telugu cinema is a part of Indian cinema producing films in the Telugu-language, in the states of Andhra Pradesh and Telangana and is centered in the Hyderabad neighbourhood of Film Nagar. The following table lists the top 10 highest-grossing Telugu films produced in the Telugu film industry.

Rank	Title	Worldwide gross	Year	Ref.
1	Baahubali 2: The Conclusion	₹1,810.43 crore	2017	
2	Pushpa 2: The Rule	₹1,622–1,800 crore	2024	
3	RRR	₹1,300–1,387 crore	2022	
4	Kalki 2898 AD	₹1,042–1,100 crore	2024	
5	Salaar: Part 1 – Ceasefire	₹614–702 crore	2023	
6	Baahubali: The Beginning	₹599.72–650 crore	2015	
7	Saaho (Note: The film was produced in both the Telugu and Hindi languages, according to the filmmakers.)	₹434–439 crore	2019	
8	Devara: Part 1	₹380–521 crore	2024	(Note: Devara's reported worldwide grosses vary between ₹380 crore (Box Office India) – ₹420 crore (DNA India) – ₹509 crore (Business Standard) – ₹521 crore (Bollywood Hungama))
9	Pushpa: The Rise	₹360 crore	2021	
10	Peddi	₹332.82 crore	2026	(Note: Peddi's reported worldwide grosses vary between ₹330 crore (Deccan Herald, Cinema Express) – ₹336.85 crore (Outlook India))

== Highest-grossing films by opening day ==
Rank	Title	Worldwide gross	Language	Year	Ref.
1	Pushpa 2: The Rule	₹247−280 crore	Telugu	2024	
2	Dhurandhar: The Revenge	₹240 crore	Hindi	2026	(Note: ₹240 crore (Hindustan Times, The Economic Times, Deccan Herald). Note that number include paid premiers.)
3	RRR	₹223 crore	Telugu	2022	
4	Baahubali 2: The Conclusion	₹217 crore	Telugu	2017	
5	Kalki 2898 AD	₹180 crore	Telugu	2024	
6	Salaar: Part 1 – Ceasefire	₹178.70 crore	Telugu	2023	
7	KGF: Chapter 2	₹165.37 crore	Kannada	2022	
8	They Call Him OG	₹155 crore	Telugu	2025	
9	Coolie	₹151 crore	Tamil	2025	
10	Leo	₹145 crore	Tamil	2023	

== Highest-grossing films by month ==
Month	Title	Worldwide gross	Language	Year	Ref.
January	Pathaan	₹1,050.30 crore	Hindi	2023	(Note: Pathaan's reported worldwide grosses vary between ₹1,050.30 crore (Bollywood Hungama) – ₹1,052.50 crore (Pinkvilla))
February	Chhaava	₹783–807.40 crore	Hindi	2025	
March	Dhurandhar: The Revenge	₹1,852.44 crore	Hindi	2026	
April	Baahubali 2: The Conclusion	₹1,810.43 crore	Telugu	2017	
May	Yeh Jawaani Hai Deewani	₹319.60 crore	Hindi	2013	
June	Kalki 2898 AD	₹1,042–1,100 crore	Telugu	2024	
July	Bajrangi Bhaijaan	₹867–969.06 crore	Hindi	2015	
August	Stree 2	₹874.58 crore	Hindi	2024	
September	Jawan	₹1,148.32–1,159 crore	Hindi	2023	(Note: Jawan's reported worldwide grosses vary between ₹1,148.32 crore (Bollywood Hungama) – ₹1,159 crore (Pinkvilla))
October	Secret Superstar	₹835–966 crore	Hindi	2017	
November	Ramayana: Part 1	₹1,600 crore	Hindi	2026	
December	Dangal	₹1,968–2,054 crore	Hindi	2016	

== Highest-grossing films by year ==
Year	Title	Worldwide gross	Industry	Ref.
1940	Sant Dnyaneshwar (Note: The film was produced in both the Marathi and Hindi languages, according to the filmmakers.)	₹4.67 crore (US$13.42 million)	Marathi	
1941	Khazanchi	₹70 lakh (US$2.12 million)	Hindustani	
1942	Basant	₹80 lakh (US$2.42 million)	Hindustani	
1943	Kismet	₹1 crore (US$3.01 million)	Hindustani	
1944	Rattan	₹1 crore (US$3.03 million)	Hindustani	
1945	Zeenat	₹70 lakh (US$2.12 million)	Hindustani	
1946	Anmol Ghadi	₹1 crore (US$3.02 million)	Hindustani	
1947	Jugnu	₹50 lakh (US$5 million)	Hindustani	
1948	Chandralekha (Note: The film was produced in both the Tamil and Hindi languages, according to the filmmakers.)	₹1.55 crore (US$3.24 million)	Tamil	
1949	Barsaat	₹2 crore (US$4.18 million)	Hindi	
1950	Samadhi	₹1.35 crore (US$2.82 million)	Hindi	
1951	Awaara	₹15.61 crore (US$32.78 million)	Hindi	(Note: See Awaara § Box office)
1952	Aan	₹3.57 crore (US$7.5 million)	Hindi	
1953	Anarkali	₹2.35 crore (US$4.94 million)	Hindi	
1954	Nagin	₹2.90 crore (US$6.09 million)	Hindi	
1955	Pather Panchali	₹10 crore (US$21 million)	Bengali	
1956	Jagte Raho (Note: The film was produced in both the Hindi and Bengali languages, according to the filmmakers.)	₹4.44 crore (US$9.32 million)	Hindi	(Note: See Jagte Raho § Box office)
1957	Mother India	₹8 crore (US$16.8 million)	Hindi	
1958	Madhumati	₹4 crore (US$8.4 million)	Hindi	
1959	Char Dil Char Rahen	₹5.27 crore (US$11.07 million)	Hindi	(Note: See Char Dil Char Rahen § Box office)
1960	Mughal-e-Azam	₹11 crore (US$23.11 million)	Hindi	
1961	Gunga Jumna	₹11 crore (US$23.11 million)	Hindi	
1962	Bees Saal Baad	₹3 crore (US$6.3 million)	Hindi	
1963	Mere Mehboob	₹6 crore (US$12.61 million)	Hindi	
1964	Sangam	₹8 crore (US$16.81 million)	Hindi	
1965	Waqt	₹6 crore (US$12.61 million)	Hindi	
1966	Phool Aur Patthar	₹17 crore (US$24.15 million)	Hindi	
1967	Hamraaz	₹13.33 crore (US$17.77 million)	Hindi	
1968	Duniya	₹18 crore (US$24 million)	Hindi	
1969	Aradhana	₹17.85 crore (US$23.8 million)	Hindi	(Note: See Aradhana (1969 film) § Box office)
1970	Mera Naam Joker	₹16.81 crore (US$22.22 million)	Hindi	(Note: See Mera Naam Joker § Box office)
1971	Caravan	₹35.3 crore (US$46.91 million)	Hindi	(Note: See Caravan (1971 film) § Box office)
1972	Seeta Aur Geeta	₹19.53 crore (US$25.85 million)	Hindi	(Note: See Seeta Aur Geeta § Box office)
1973	Bobby	₹30 crore (US$39.09 million)	Hindi	
1974	Roti Kapada Aur Makaan	₹10.50 crore (US$13.06 million)	Hindi	
1975	Sholay	₹58 crore (US$69 million)	Hindi	
1976	Barood	₹19.32 crore (US$21.46 million)	Hindi	(Note: See Barood (1976 film) § Box office)
1977	Amar Akbar Anthony	₹15.50 crore (US$17.69 million)	Hindi	
1978	Muqaddar Ka Sikandar	₹26 crore (US$31.66 million)	Hindi	
1979	Suhaag	₹10 crore (US$12.69 million)	Hindi	
1980	Adventures of Ali-Baba and the Forty Thieves (Note: The film was produced in both the Hindi and Russian languages, according to the filmmakers.)	₹22.11 crore (US$28.06 million)	Hindi	(Note: See Adventures of Ali-Baba and the Forty Thieves (film) § Box office)
1981	Kranti	₹20 crore (US$23.01 million)	Hindi	
1982	Disco Dancer	₹100.70 crore (US$106.08 million)	Hindi	
1983	Coolie	₹21 crore (US$20.71 million)	Hindi	
1984	Jagir	₹35.32 crore (US$31.07 million)	Hindi	(Note: See Jagir (film) § Box office)
1985	Ram Teri Ganga Maili	₹19 crore (US$15.37 million)	Hindi	
1986	Karma	₹14 crore (US$11.11 million)	Hindi	
1987	Hukumat	₹11 crore (US$8.49 million)	Hindi	
1988	Tezaab	₹16 crore (US$12.69 million)	Hindi	
1989	Maine Pyar Kiya	₹45 crore (US$27.74 million)	Hindi	
1990	Dil	₹20 crore (US$11.43 million)	Hindi	
1991	Saajan	₹18 crore (US$7.93 million)	Hindi	
1992	Beta	₹23.50 crore (US$9.07 million)	Hindi	
1993	Aankhen	₹25.25 crore (US$8.03 million)	Hindi	
1994	Hum Aapke Hain Koun..!	₹128 crore (US$40.8 million)	Hindi	
1995	Dilwale Dulhania Le Jayenge	₹103 crore (US$31.77 million)	Hindi	
1996	Raja Hindustani	₹76 crore (US$21.45 million)	Hindi	
1997	Dil To Pagal Hai	₹71.87 crore (US$19.79 million)	Hindi	
1998	Kuch Kuch Hota Hai	₹107 crore (US$25.93 million)	Hindi	
1999	Hum Saath-Saath Hain	₹81.71 crore (US$18.98 million)	Hindi	
2000	Mohabbatein	₹90.01 crore (US$20.03 million)	Hindi	
2001	Kabhi Khushi Kabhie Gham	₹136 crore (US$28.82 million)	Hindi	
2002	Devdas	₹168 crore (US$34.57 million)	Hindi	
2003	Kal Ho Naa Ho	₹86.09 crore (US$18.48 million)	Hindi	
2004	Veer-Zaara	₹97.64 crore (US$21.55 million)	Hindi	
2005	Chandramukhi	₹90 crore (US$20.41 million)	Tamil	
2006	Dhoom 2	₹162 crore (US$35.76 million)	Hindi	
2007	Om Shanti Om	₹152 crore (US$36.76 million)	Hindi	
2008	Ghajini	₹194.58 crore (US$44.73 million)	Hindi	
2009	3 Idiots	₹400.61 crore (US$82.76 million)	Hindi	
2010	Enthiran	₹283 crore (US$61.89 million) – ₹320 crore (US$69.98 million)	Tamil	(Note: Enthiran's reported worldwide grosses vary between ₹283 crore (Hindustan Times) – ₹290 crore (India Today) – ₹300 crore (The New Indian Express) – ₹320 crore (Box Office India))
2011	Bodyguard	₹253 crore (US$54.21 million)	Hindi	
2012	Ek Tha Tiger	₹335 crore (US$62.69 million)	Hindi	
2013	Dhoom 3	₹556.74 crore (US$95.01 million)	Hindi	
2014	PK	₹769.89 crore (US$126.15 million)	Hindi	
2015	Bajrangi Bhaijaan	₹918.18 crore (US$143.13 million)	Hindi	
2016	Dangal	₹1,968 crore (US$302.2 million) – ₹2,054 crore (US$315.41 million)	Hindi	
2017	Baahubali 2: The Conclusion	₹1,810.43 crore (US$278.01 million)	Telugu	
2018	2.0	₹699.89 crore (US$102.34 million) – ₹800 crore (US$116.98 million)	Tamil	
2019	War	₹475.62 crore (US$67.54 million)	Hindi	
2020	Tanhaji	₹368 crore (US$49.66 million)	Hindi	
2021	Pushpa: The Rise	₹350 crore (US$47.35 million) – ₹360 crore (US$48.7 million)	Telugu	
2022	RRR	₹1,300 crore (US$165.38 million) – ₹1,387 crore (US$176.45 million)	Telugu	
2023	Jawan	₹1,148.32 crore (US$139.02 million)	Hindi	
2024	Pushpa 2: The Rule	₹1,622 crore (US$193.86 million)–₹1,800 crore (US$215.13 million)	Telugu	
2025	Dhurandhar	₹1,350.83 crore (equivalent to ₹14 billion or US$150 million in 2026) – ₹1,428 crore (equivalent to ₹15 billion or US$160 million in 2026)	Hindi	
2026	Dhurandhar: The Revenge	₹1,852.44 crore (US$200 million)	Hindi	

== Highest-grossing franchises ==
The Khiladi franchise was the first film franchise to gross over ₹100 crore. The Baahubali is the first franchise to collect over ₹1,000 crore at the box office, the Dhurandhar Duology is the only franchise where all the films have grossed at least ₹1,000 crore worldwide.

Highest-grossing franchises

Rank	Franchise	Worldwide gross (crore)	No. of films	Average gross (crore)	Highest grosser

1	YRF Spy Universe	₹3,292.98	7	₹470	Pathaan (₹1,050.30 crore)
1	Pathaan (2023)	₹1,050.30			
2	Tiger Zinda Hai (2017)	₹564.20			
3	War (2019)	₹475.62			
4	Tiger 3 (2023)	₹466.63			
5	Ek Tha Tiger (2012)	₹334.39			
6	War 2 (2025)	₹303.22			
7	Alpha (2026)	₹98.62			

2	Dhurandhar Duology	₹3,203.27	2	₹1,602	Dhurandhar: The Revenge (₹1,852.44 crore)
1	The Revenge (2026)	₹1,852.44			
2	Dhurandhar (2025)	₹1,350.83			

3	Baahubali	₹2,463.13	3	₹821	Baahubali 2: The Conclusion (₹1,810.43 crore)
1	The Conclusion (2017)	₹1,810.43			
2	The Beginning (2015)	₹600			
3	The Epic (2025)	₹52.70			

4	Pushpa	₹1,982	2	₹991	Pushpa 2: The Rule (₹1,622–1,800 crore)
1	The Rule (2024)	₹1,622			
2	The Rise (2021)	₹360			

5	KGF	₹1,450	2	₹725	KGF: Chapter 2 (₹1,200–1,250)
1	Chapter 2 (2022)	₹1,200			
2	Chapter 1 (2018)	₹250			

6	Maddock Horror Comedy Universe	₹1,447.22	5	₹289	Stree 2 (₹874.58 crore)
1	Stree 2 (2024)	₹874.58			
2	Stree (2018)	₹180.76			
3	Thamma (2025)	₹169.75			
4	Munjya (2024)	₹132.13			
5	Bhediya (2022)	₹90			

7	Rohit Shetty's Cop Universe	₹1,410.9	5	₹282	Simmba (₹391.68–400.19 crore)
1	Simmba (2018) (Note: Simmba's reported worldwide grosses vary between ₹391.68 crore (Box Office India) – ₹400.61 crore (Bollywood Hungama))	₹391.68			
2	Singham Again (2024) (Note: Singham Again's reported worldwide grosses vary between ₹367 crore – ₹389.64 crore (Bollywood Hungama))	₹367			
3	Sooryavanshi (2021)	₹294.91			
4	Singham Returns (2014)	₹216			
5	Singham (2011)	₹141.31			

8	Jailer	₹1,440	2	₹720	Jailer 2 (₹835 crore)
1	Jailer 2 (2026)	₹835			
2	Jailer (2023) (Note: Jailer's reported worldwide grosses vary between ₹605 crore (India Today) – ₹650 crore (Firstpost, Cinema Express))	₹605			

9	Kantara	₹1,250	2	₹625	Kantara: Chapter 1 (₹850–852 crore)
1	Kantara: Chapter 1 (2025)	₹850			
2	Kantara (2022)	₹400			

10	Lokesh Cinematic Universe	₹1,100	3	₹367	Leo (₹595–615 crore)
1	Leo (2023)	₹595			
2	Vikram (2022)	₹400			
3	Kaithi (2019)	₹105			

11	Drishyam	₹1,033.81	3	₹345	Drishyam 3 (₹553.81 crore)
1	Drishyam: The Conclusion (2026)	₹553.81			
2	Drishyam 2 (2022)	₹345			
3	Drishyam (2015)	₹135			

12	Housefull	₹1,028.57	5	₹206	Housefull 4 (₹280.27 crore)
1	Housefull 4 (2019)	₹280.27			
2	Housefull 5 (2025)	₹242.80			
3	Housefull 3 (2016)	₹195			
4	Housefull 2 (2012)	₹186			
5	Housefull (2010)	₹124.50			

13	Enthiran	₹982.89	2	₹491	2.0 (₹699.89–800 crore)
1	2.0 (2018)	₹699.89			
2	Enthiran (2010)	₹283			

14	Ponniyin Selvan	₹846	2	₹423	Ponniyin Selvan: I (₹500 crore)
1	Ponniyin Selvan: I (2022)	₹500			
2	Ponniyin Selvan: II (2023)	₹346			

15	Gadar	₹820.13	2	₹410	Gadar 2 (₹687–691.08 crore)
1	Gadar 2 (2023)	₹687			
2	Ek Prem Katha (2001)	₹133.13			

15	Dhoom	₹755.82	3	₹252	Dhoom 3 (₹556.74 crore)
1	Dhoom 3 (2013)	₹556.74			
2	Dhoom 2 (2006)	₹151.38			
3	Dhoom (2004)	₹47.70			

16	Sujeeth Cinematic Universe	₹729	2	₹365	Saaho (₹434−439 crore)
1	Saaho (2019)	₹435			
2	They Call Him OG (2025) (Note: They Call Him OG's reported worldwide grosses vary between ₹294 crore (Daily News and Analysis; The Telegraph) – ₹300 crore (The Economic Times))	₹294			

17	Bhool Bhulaiyaa	₹717.16	3	₹239	Bhool Bhulaiyaa 3 (₹371–423.85 crore)
1	Bhool Bhulaiyaa 3 (2024) (Note: Bhool Bhulaiyaa 3's reported worldwide grosses vary between ₹371 crore – ₹423.85 crore (Bollywood Hungama))	₹371			
2	Bhool Bhulaiyaa 2 (2022) (Note: Bhool Bhulaiyaa 2's reported worldwide grosses vary between ₹263.81 crore (Box Office India) – ₹266.88 crore (Bollywood Hungama))	₹263.81			
3	Bhool Bhulaiyaa (2007) (Note: Bhool Bhulaiyaa's reported worldwide grosses vary between ₹82.35 crore (Bollywood Hungama) – ₹82.84 crore (Box Office India))	₹82.35			

18	Dabangg	₹686.34	3	₹229	Dabangg 2 (₹249.24 crore)
1	Dabangg 2 (2012)	₹249.24			
2	Dabangg (2010)	₹219.27			
3	Dabangg 3 (2019)	₹217.83			

19	Golmaal	₹668.74	5	₹134	Golmaal Again (₹310.98 crore)
1	Golmaal Again (2017)	₹310.98			
2	Golmaal 3 (2010)	₹169.56			
3	Golmaal Returns (2008)	₹80			
4	Cirkus (2022)	₹61.47			
5	Fun Unlimited (2006)	₹46.73			

20	Krrish	₹602.26	3	₹201	Krrish 3 (₹393.37 crore)
1	Krrish 3 (2013)	₹393.37			
2	Krrish (2006)	₹126.56			
3	Koi... Mil Gaya (2003)	₹82.33			

== See also ==
- 100 Crore Club – Indian language films grossing over 1 billion rupees
- 1000 Crore Club – Indian films grossing over 10 billion rupees
- List of highest-grossing films in India
- List of highest-grossing Indian films in overseas markets
- List of highest-grossing re-released Indian films
- List of highest-grossing South Indian films
- List of most expensive Indian films
- Lists of highest-grossing films
