= Mitra Gadhavi =

Indian actor

Mitra Gadhvi
- Born: 22 September 1990 (age 35); Vyara, Gujarat, India
- Occupations: Actor; Writer; Television personality
- Years active: 2010–present
- Notable work: Chhello Divas, Anita (short film)

Mitra Gadhvi (born 22 September 1990) is an Indian actor, writer, and lyricist from Gujarat. He is known for his roles in films such as Chhello Divas, Bas Ek Chance, Shu Thayu?, and 3 Ekka. His career as a theatre artist spanned more than a decade. His 2020 short film Anita became the first ever Gujarati movie to be screened at Venice Film Festival.

He had tested positive for COVID-19 in January 2022. During the pandemic, Mitra was applauded for using social media platforms to amplify SOS calls of patients across Delhi and Gujarat.

As a child, Mitra was keen to perform on stage. Later, he decided to pursue acting as a profession, and moved to Mumbai.

== Filmography ==
Mitra also wrote & directed a play 'Listen – We Need To Talk'.

Year	Movie	Character's Name	Designation
2015	Chhello Divas	Loy	Main lead
2015	Bas Ek Chance	Meet	Starring role
2016	Daav Thai Gayo Yaar		Main lead
2018	Shu Thayu?	Chikno (Chirag)	Main lead
2018	Ventilator	Bhotiyo	Starring role
2018	Karnamu (short film)		Main lead and writer
2018	Family Circus	JJ	Main lead
2020	Affraa Taffri		Main lead
2020	Anita (short film)	Vikram	Main lead
2021	Vakeel Babu (short film)		
2022	Hey Kem Chho London	Krishna	Main lead
2023	Hun Iqbal	Sr Inspector Mohan Joshi	Main lead
2023	3 Ekka	Bhargav urfe bhuriyo	Main Lead
2024	Lagan Special	Dr. Jogi	Main lead
2024	Fakt Purusho Maate	Kirtan	Main lead
2024	The Great Gujarati Matrimony	Raghav	Main lead
2025	Mithada Maheman	Jay	Main lead
2025	Sikandar (2025 film)	Ramesh, Sanjay's Quarry Manager	Cameo
2025	Bhram	Mehul	Main lead
2026	Asambhauuu	Bro	Main lead
