= List of Gujarati films of 2024 =

List of Gujarati language films released in 2024

This is a list of Gujarati language films that were released in 2024. The Gujarati films collectively grossed ₹89 crore (US$9.5 million) in 2024, according to Ormax Box Office Report.

== Box-office collection ==
Rank	Film	Director	Studio(s)	Gross	Source
1	Jhamkudi	Umang Vyas	Soul Sutra, RD Brothers	est. ₹25 crore (US$2.7 million)	

== January–March ==
Opening	Name	Genre	Director	Cast	Ref.
5 January	Danny Jigar	Comedy action spoof	Krishnadev Yagnik	Yash Soni, Tarjanee Bhadla, Chetan Daiya, Jitendra Thakkar, Rahul Raval	
12 January	Prem No Padkar	Romantic action drama	Shatrughan Goswami	Hitu Kanodia, Mamta Soni	
19 January	Ittaa Kittaa	Family drama	Manthan Purohit, Abhinn Sharma	Raunaq Kamdar, Mansi Parekh	
19 January	Mara Pappa Superhero	Family drama	Darshan Ashwin Trivedi	Abhinay Banker, Shraddha Dangar, Bhavya Sirohi, Revanta Sarabhai, Bhushan Bhatt, Bharat Thakkar, Rudraksh Nisiddh panchal	
26 January	Muktighar	Drama	Bhavin Trivedi	Ragi Jani, Chetan Daiya, Aakash Zala, Sanjay Galsar, Hitesh Thaker, Amit Utsuk, Nitin Ahir, Het Dave, Rudraksh Nisiddh panchal	
2 February	Kamthaan	Crime comedy	Dhrunad	Hitu Kanodia, Sanjay Goradia, Arvind Vaidya, Darshan Jariwala	
9 February	Lagan Special	Comedy	Rahul Bhole, Vinit Kanojia	Malhar Thakar, Puja Joshi, Mitra Gadhvi, Nijal Modi	
9 February	Prem Thaay Chhe Ek J Vaar	Romantic drama	Shahbazkhan Pathan	Sandip Patani, Sweta Sen, Sunjay Patel	
9 February	Ramat Ramade Romance	Romantic comedy drama	Hitesh Beldar	Sunil Vishrani, Marjina Diwan, Umang Acharya, Nishith Brahmbhatt	
16 February	Kasoombo	Historical drama	Vijaygiri Bava	Dharmendra Gohil, Raunaq Kamdar, Shraddha Dangar, Darshan Pandya, Monal Gajjar, Rudraksh Nisiddh panchal	
23 February	Nasoor	Psychological thriller	Rishil Joshi	Hitu Kanodia, Niilam Paanchal, Denisha Ghumra, Heena Jaikishan	
1 March	Vanilla Ice Cream	Drama	Preet	Malhar Thakar, Yukti Randeria, Vandana Pathak, Archan Trivedi, Satish Bhatt	
15 March	Maunam	Romance, Suspense Thriller	Ravi Sachdev	Bhavik Bhojak, Aanchal Shah, Maulik Chauhan, Chetan Daiya	
8 March	Jhopadpatti	Drama	Parth Y. Bhatt	Dishita Bhatt, Bhawini Gandhi, Bhavini Jani, Hemang Dave, Rudraksh Nisiddh panchal	
22 March	Yaa Devi Sarvabhuteshu	Suspense thriller	Amit Ramesh Rughani	Kavisha Sanghvi, Anaiyaa Patel, Nisarg Trivedi, Shilpa Thakar	
22 March	31st	Crime drama	Pranav M. Patel	Shraddha Dangar, Hitu Kanodia, Prachi Thaker, Parikshit Tamaliya, Chetan Daiya, Vipul Vithlani	
22 March	Premni Pathshala	Crime drama	Naitik Desai	Naitik Desai, Vidhi Shah, Kajal Kushwahaji, Grancy Kaneria	
22 March	Sorry Sajna	Action drama romance	Jitu Pandya	Vikram Thakor, Prinal Oberoi, Guru Patel, Yamini Joshi	

== April–June ==
Opening	Name	Genre	Director	Cast	Ref.
5 April	Aaje Taare Javu Padshe Sasariye	Drama	Prithvisinh Rajput		
19 April	Mukhi	Drama	Kalpesh Desai	Jeet Upendra, Krishna Zala	
19 April	Tandavam	Action drama	Akib Salim Garana	Prabhatsinh Rajput, Priyanka Chudasama, Dinkar Upadhyay, Kasif Chisty	
19 April	31st December	Drama	Kalp Trivedi, Suresh Joshi	Sanjay Goradia, Yatin Parmar, Jignesh Modi, Karthik Rashtrapal	
26 April	Dadagiri	Drama	Keshav Rathod	Hitu Kanodia, Prinal Oberoi, Chandan Rathod	
3 May	Life Ek Settlement	Family drama romance	Ghanshyam B. Talaviya	Samarth Sharma, Sweta Sen, Prem Gadhavi, Mamta Soni	
3 May	Jagat	Thriller	Harshil Bhatt	Yash Soni, Chetan Daiya, Riddhi Yadav	
10 May	Insurance Jimmy	Crime, Suspense, Thriller	Parth Shukla	Parth Shukla, Chetan Daiya, Ragi Jani, Sweety Mahavadiya, Brinda Trivedi, Maddy Kava	
10 May	S2G2: A Romantic Mission	Romance	Rakesh Shah & Team	Maulik Chauhan, Katha Patel, Shrey Maradia, Priyal Bhatt, Archan Trivedi	
10 May	Maru Mann Taru Thayu	Romance drama	Siddharth K Trivedi	Bharat Chawda, Heena Varde, Mukesh Rao, Bharat Thakkar	
17 May	Samandar	Gangster drama	Vishal Vada Vala	Mayur Chauhan, Jagjeet Singh Vadher, Dharmendra Gohil, Deeksha Joshi, Chetan Dhanani	
24 May	Aanganwadi	Drama	Devesh Raval	Bhavik Bhojak, Pooja K. Doshi, Morli Patel, Ratan Rangwani, Maddy Kava	
24 May	Roshni: Confused Girl	Drama	Jagdish Soni	Kinjal Raval, Uren Kumar, Sandy Varma and Nirav Kalal	
31 May	Jhamkudi	Horror comedy	Umang Vyas	Viraj Ghelani, Mansi Parekh, Sanjay Goradia, Ojas Rawal, Chetan Daiya	
7 June	Chupp	Drama suspense mystery	Nishithkumar Brahmabhatt	Hiten Kumar, Morli Patel, Akash Pandya, Vikee Shah	
14 June	Love You Baa	Drama	Raju Somabhai Patel	Denisha Ghumra, Bhavini Jani, Danesh Gandhi, Ragi Jani	
14 June	Jalul Jalul Thi Aavjo	Drama	Purvesh Parmar	Hardik Bhavsar, Kavya Jethwa, Vivek Buch and Prashant Barot	
21 June	Trisha On The Rocks	Romance comedy drama	Krishnadev Yagnik	Janki Bodiwala, Ravi Gohil, Hiten Kumar	

== July–September ==
Opening	Name	Genre	Director	Cast	Ref.
5 July	Builder Boys	Comedy	Chanakya Patel	Raunaq Kamdar, Shivam Parekh, Esha Kansara, Rudraksh Nisiddh panchal	
19 July	Ram Bharosey	Romance	Vishal Vada Vala	Dhairya Rathod, Reeva Rachh, Maulik Nayak, Nilesh Parmar	
26 July	Chor Chor	Comedy	Rajan Rathod	Viveka Patel, Rajan Rathod, Anuraag Prapanna, Sunil Visharani, Hemang Shah, Bhushan bhatt, Bhoomika Patel	
2 August	Karkhanu	Horror comedy	Rushabh Thanki	Kaajal Oza Vaidya, Archan Trivedi, Makrand, Raju Barot, Parth Madhukrushna, Hardik Shastri, Harshdeepsinh Jadeja, Dadhichi Thaker, Rudraksh Nisiddh panchal	
2 August	Natak!	Comedy drama	K. R. Devmani	Maulik Chauhan, Krina Pathak, Jaikrishna Rathod, Dipika Raval, Hetal Barot	
2 August	Vaar Tahevaar	Romance	Chinmay Purohit	Monal Gajjar, Parikshit Tamaliya, Tiku Talsania	
9 August	Natvar Urfe NTR	Drama	Devesh Raval	Aanchal Shah, Chetan Daiya, Kalpana Gagdekar, Archan Trivedi, Ragi Jani, Maddy Kava	
15 August	Bhai Ni Beni Ladki	Family drama	Kumar K Makvana	Vikram Thakor, Aanshi Barot, Arzu Limbachiya, Jitu Pandya, Sanjay Patel, Kumar K Makwana, Sonal, Paresh	
23 August	Fakt Purusho Maate	Comedy	Jay Bodas, Parth Trivedi	Amitabh Bachchan, Yash Soni, Darshan Jariwala, Mitra Gadhavi, Esha Kansara	
30 August	Vhala Thodu Samjo To Saru	Drama	Rajesh Bhatt Dholka	Kalpesh Patel, Moksha Shukla, Dipika Raval, Vijay Desai, Bhumika Ralhonde, Archan Trivedi, Krunal Bhatt, Mantra Pandya	
6 September	Udan Chhoo	Drama	Anish Shah	Aarohi Patel, Aarjav Trivedi, Deven Bhojani, Prachee Shah Paandya, Rudraksh Nisiddh panchal	
13 September	Interview	Drama	Killol Parmar	Parikshit Tamaliya, Sohni Bhatt, Devangi Bhatt, Kamal Joshi	
13 September	Frendo	Comedy	Vipul Sharma	Tushar Sadhu, Twinkal Patel, Deep Vaidya, Kushal Mistry, Jay Pandya, Prashant Barot, Jimini Trivedi	
20 September	Locha Laapsi	Thriller Comedy	Sachin Brahmbhatt	Malhar Thakar, Chirag Vohra, Vaibhavi Upadhyay, Chetan Dhanani	
20 September	Pratikar	Drama	Dharmin Patel	Mamta Soni, Adi Irani, Umang Acharya, Paresh Bhatt	
20 September	Satrangi Re...	Drama	Irshad Dalal	Raj Baasira, Katha Patel, Mehul Buch, Prashant Barot	
27 September	Ranbhoomi	Social drama	Nilesh Chovatiya	Harshal Mankad, Sheetal Patel, Vipul Viththlani, Mehul Buch, Pooja Soni, Manin Trivedi, Chetas Oza, Mitresh Verma	

== October–December ==
Opening	Name	Genre	Director	Cast	Ref.
11 October	Bhalle Padharya	Horror Comedy	Maniesh Kumar Madhav	Bharat Chawda, Prem Gadhavi, Saurabh Rajyaguru	
11 October	Hu Tara Vina Kai Nai	Drama	Dhruval Sodagar	Umesh Barot, Rubina Belim, Nisarg Trivedi, Jaimini Trivedi	
12 October	Jagdish Dilwalo	Drama	Amit Bhatt	Jagdish Thakor, Jitu Pandya, Ayush Jadeja	
18 October	Karma Wallet	Drama	Vipul Sharma	Tushar Sadhu, Jay Pandya, Shreya Dave, Prashant Barot, Jaimini Trivedi	
18 October	Hahacar	Comedy drama	Pratiksinh Chavda	Mayur Chauhan, Hemang Shah, Mayank Gadhavi, Chetan Daiya, Hetal Puniwala	
25 October	Daitya	Horror drama	Mitul Gupte	Anuradha Rudrapriya, Ruby Thakkar, Kinnary Pankti Panchal, Hanif Mir	
1 November	Hal Bheru Gamde	Drama	Harsukh Patel	Vikram Thakor, Vidhi Shah, Sweta Sen, Jitu Pandya, Guru Patel, Jayndera Mehta, Jitu Pandya, Pratima T., Hitesh Raval, Kalpesh Patel	
7 November	Kale Lagan Chhe !?!	Romantic comedy	Humayun Makrani	Parikshit Tamaliya, Puja Joshi, Anurag Prapanna, Dipika Raval, Jignesh Modi, Maulik Pathak, Rudraksh Nisiddh panchal	
15 November	Ajab Raat Ni Gajab Vaat	Comedy	Prem Gadhavi, Killol Parmar	Bhavya Gandhi, Aarohi Patel, Deep Vaidya, Harsh Thakkar, Radhika Barot	
15 November	Bubbly Bindaas	Comedy	Vasant Narkar	Nirali Oza, Ravi Omprakash Rao, Grancy Kaneria, Krina Pathak, Kartik Rashtrapal, Magan Luhar, Arvind Vegda	
22 November	The Great Gujarati Matrimony	Romance	Preet	Hiten Kumar, Mitra Gadhavi, Siddhi Idnani, Devarshi Shah,	
22 November	Lattha Sadan	Comedy	Hemin Trivedi	Hardik Sangani, Maulik Nayak, Kuldeep Gor, Jay Bhatt, Ujjval Dave	
22 November	Sasan	Drama	Ashok Ghosh	Anjali Barot, Chetan Dhanani, Mayur Chauhan, Ragini Shah, Mehul Buch, Maulik Nayak, Chirag Jani	
27 December	Bhoomi	Drama	Bhavin Trivedi	Ragi Jani, Yamini Joshi, Hitesh Thakar	

== See also ==
- Gujarati cinema
- List of Gujarati films
- List of Gujarati films of 2025
- List of highest-grossing Gujarati films
