= List of Gujarati films of 2026 =

List of Gujarati language films released in 2026

This is a list of Gujarati language films released or scheduled to release in 2026.

== January–March ==
Opening	Name	Genre	Director	Cast	Ref.
1 January	Bicharo Bachelor	Comedy	Vipul Sharma	Tushar Sadhu, Twinkle Patel, Riddhi Dangar, Shivani Pancholi, Prashant Barot, Jay Pandya, Anchal Shah	
1 January	Tu Male To Utssav	Drama	Harin Thaker	Jigarr Shah, Sonu Chandrapal, Sagar Panchal, Khusbu Trivedi, Ragi Jani	
9 January	Jai Kanhaiyalall Ki	Drama	Dharmessh Mehta	Siddharth Randeria, Hitu Kanodia, Aneri Vajani, Shrey Maradiya, Vaishali Thakkar	
16 January	Mauje Dariya	Drama	Parry Majumdar	Taksh Shah, Siddharth Dolli, Nishma Soni, Manav Gohil, Hitul Pujara, Prashant Barot, Kamlesh Oza Hemin Trivedi, Hitesh Thakkar, Prakul Pandita	
16 January	School Days	Drama	Jayesh Trivedi	Mehul Buch, Mamta Soni, Chetan Daiya, Shekhar Shukla, Varun Dave, Devarsh Dave, Jignesh Modi, Falu Dave, Nirali Oza, Amar Kubavat	
16 January	Thata Thai Gyu Ta Ta Thaiya	Drama	Bhavesh Gorasiya	Sanjay Galsar, Sanjaysinh Chauhan, Hemang Shah, Vidhi Shah, Bhavika Khatri, Aanshi Barot, Bhavini Jani, Bharat Thakkar	
23 January	Mobile Ni Side Effects	Drama	Chandani Shah	Mamta Soni, Saurabh Rajguru, Dhwanit Shah	
30 January	Chaurangi	Drama	Vinod Parmar	Sanjay Goradia, Deeksha Joshi, Sonali Lele Desai, Sohni Bhatt, Makrand Shukla, Nijal Modi, Mukesh Rao, Magan Luhar, Vaibhav Biniwale, Neel Bhatt, Riddhi Yadav	
30 January	Malumadi	Drama	Milan Joshi	Bharati Thakkar, Aakash Pandya, Priyam Talaviya, Diya Bhatt	
30 January	Paatki	Thriller	Abhinay Deshmukh	Hiten Tejwani, Shraddha Dangar, Gaurav Paswala,Suchita Trivedi, Ujjval Dave, Karan Joshi, Nilesh Parmar, Makrand Shukla	
6 February	Harpalde Shakti Na Amar Ajavada	Devotional	Jitubhai Jadeja	Jeet Upendra, Mehul Buch, Bhavini Jani	
6 February	Lagan Laagii Re	Romance	Saandeep Patel	Malhar Thakar, Aarohi Patel, Tatsat Munshi, Aarati Vyas Patel, Ragi Jani, Hemang Dave, Makrand Shukla	
6 February	Maher Karo Maa Meldi	Drama	Nilesh Mehta	Nirav Kalal, Arzu Limbachiya, Rajiv Panchal, Pooja Soni	
6 February	Pass Na Pass	Comedy	Rafiq Talukdar	Malhar Pandya, Jasmin Patel, Dharmesh Vyas, Adi Irani, Prashant Barot	
13 February	Black Birthday	Thriller	Birjesh Bauddh; Shahid Ali	Arjav Trivedi, Yogita Patel, Chetan Daiya, Smit Joshi, Magan Luhar, Dhruvee Soni, Jitendra Thakkar	
13 February	Master Mind	Thriller	Barkat Wadhwania	Sanjay Goradia, Nadeem Wadhwania, Jignesh Modi, Hemang Shah, Nisarg Trivedi, Manoj Rao, Yamini Joshi, Kalpesh Patel, Gaurang JD	
13 February	Surti Locho	Comedy	Sanjeev Jain	Parag Malam, Grancy Kaneria, Himanshu Pathak, Poonam Sharma, Rajnish Rana, Nimesh Maheriya	
20 February	Behadd	Drama	Ankoosh Bhatt	Danish Gandhi, Hitu Kanodia, Jahnvi Chauhan, Nimesh Diliprai, Sanjay Goradia	
20 February	Hi-Fi Bako	Drama	Nishith Brahmbhatt	Muni Jha, Prenal Oberai, Samarth Sharma, Bhavini Jani, Kalpesh Patel	
27 February	K Kh G Gh	Drama	Akhil Kotak	Mona Thiba, Hitu Kanodia, Bhavini Jani, Jitendra Thakkar, Arvind Vegda, Shounak Vyas, Deepa Trivedi,	
27 February	Laagani No Melo	Drama	Rajan Ramgopal Verma	Arjav Trivedi, Rutvi Patel, Sanjay Galsar, Katha Patel, Anang Desai, Bhavini JAni	
27 February	Shakti	Drama	Bhavin Trivedi	Mona Thiba, Morli Patel, Chetan Daiya, Prakash Gadhvi, Dinesh Lamba, Kashish Rathore	
27 February	Tu Duniya Chhe Mari	Drama	Prem Gadhavi, Ishan Rajput, Ravi Rana	Vikram Thakor, Riya Jaiswal, Jitu Pandya, Mitresh Verma	
13 March	Marm – Ek Bhed	Thriller	Kanu Prajapati	Vaishakhee Shah, Mir Hanif, Grancy Kaneria, Parmeshwar Sirsikar	
13 March	Tu Geeta Hu Kurbaan	Romance	Bhavesh Gorasia	Shiv Upadhyay, Kruzin Singhania, Hemali Gohil, Moulik Pathak, Hitesh Raval, Ratan Rangwani	
13 March	Adhuri Vaat	Drama	Keyur Patel	Uren Kumar, Bhoomi Somani, Jignesh Modi	

== April–June ==
Opening	Name	Genre	Director	Cast	Ref.
17 April	Kuka is Money Cash	Drama	Himanshu Patel	Samarth Sharma, Utkarsh Khatri, Meggha Bhatti, Bharat Thakkar, Kinnal Nayak, Dency Patel, Chetan Daiya, Arvind Vegda	
17 April	Laagni	Drama	Rahul Vegad	Jagjeetsinh Vadher, Pankti Patel, Jignesh Modi, Firoz Irani, Mir Hanif	
24 April	Behrupiyo	Thriller	Raja Sanjay Choksi	Kinjal Rajpriya, Jayesh More, Denisha Ghumra, Neeta Paryani, Aakash Ahuja, Deep Sheth, Aasheema Vardaan	
24 April	Jene Ghare Dikri No Avter Eno Bedo Par	Drama	Mukesh Thakor	Jayendra Mehta, Jayesh Thakor, Jignesh Modi	
1 May	Dhabkaaro	Comedy	Abhishek Shah	Deven Bhojani, Aarjav Trivedi	
8 May	BGS Hostel	Comedy	Keshav Rathod	Umesh Barot, Arzu Limbachiya, Shiv Upadhyay, Kruzin Singhania, Jignesh Modi	
8 May	Gulkandi	Drama	Raju Somabhai Patel	Darsh Prajapati, Bhakti Maniar, Daan Pawar, Nimita Vagashiya, Naresh Prajapati	
8 May	Lakshyavedh	Crime	Nayan Bhatt	Aarti Suthar, Shrinil Jani	
8 May	Vaanki Chuki Love Story	Drama	Dhwani Gautam	Puja Joshi, Parikshit Tamaliya, Bhavin Bhanushali, Miloni Jhonsa, Dharmesh Vyas, Surbhi Javeri Vyas, Chetan Daiya, Hemang Dave, Akash Pandya, Hemin Trivedi, Satvi Chokshi	
15 May	Dharpakad	Thriller	Anish Shah	Malhar Thakar, Shruhad Goswami, Jay Bhatt, Prashant Barot, Partik Rathod	
22 May	Bhamardo	Comedy	Shailesh Padsala	Jash Trada, Hitarth Yadav, Rahul Raval, Vineeta Joshi, Kalpana Gagdekar, Shreedeven Tarpara, Hetal Puniwala, Bhavini Jani	
22 May	Shubh Managal Dhamal	Comedy	Vipul Sharma,	Tushar Sadhu, Vyoma Nandi, Khushbhu Trivedi, Akash Pandya, Jay Pandya, Ragi Jani, Archan Trivedi, Prashant Barot	
22 May	Shiv	Drama	Hitesh Beldar	Umesh Barot, Riya Jaiswal	
29 May	Kabanda	Action, Drama	Rehan Chaudhary	Shyam Nair, Tarjanee Bhadla, Brinda Trivedi, Ruchita Chotani, Ankit Brahmbhatt	
5 June	NRI Dulhan	Comedy	Bharat Mehta	Aanchal Shah, Vishal Solanki, Akash Pandya, Dharmesh Vyas, Dilip Rawal, Greeva Kansara	
5 June	Sargam	Drama	Nilesh Chovatiya	Harshal Mankad Heyan, Shree Mandaviya, Darshinaa Barot	
12 June	Badhu Alright Che	Comedy	Umang Vyas	Viraj Ghelani, Jhanvi Gurnani, Mehul Buch, Deep Vaidya,Vinita Mahesh, Khushbu Trivedi	
12 June	Pappa Mara Wonderful	Drama	Rajkumar Soni	Vidhi Shah, Akash Bhil	
12 June	Jindgi Haji Baki Che Dost	Drama	Rajendra Vyas	Mehul Buch, Ragi Jani, Jaimini Modi, Bharat Thakkar, Jay PAndya	
19 June	Jindagi Once More	Drama	Jaymin Modi	Siddharth Randeria, Aarti Patel, Deep Dholakia, Jahanvi Dhakan	
19 June	State of Rama: Dharyu Dhani Nu Thay	Drama	Bhavesh Gorasia	Prenal Oberai, Rurook Dave, Dharmesh Vyas, Bharat Thakkar	
19 June	The Dark Side	Drama	Sailesh Bhanbhani	Shrey Maradiya, Bhumika Barot, Hetal Barot, Atul Lakhani,	
26 June	Kadaknath	Thriller	Kaushik Garasiya	Abhinay Banker, Denisha Ghumra, Nirav Bhabhor, Nisarg Trivedi, Chetan Daiya, Suryashi Shah, Het Panchal	

== July–September ==
Opening	Name	Genre	Director	Cast	Ref.
3 July	Karma Nu Rahasyam	Crime	Asif Silavat	Utsav Naik, Sapna Vyas, Asif Silavat, Makrand Shukla, Bansi Rajput, Arvind Vegda	
3 July	Aghru Che Yaar	Drama	Tapan Patel	Jaydeep Gangani, Urvashi Chauhan, Om Bhatt, Mehul Buch, Drashti Shah, Krunal Bhatt	
3 July	Kalapi	Drama	Chandani Shah	Yashraj Sinh Vaghela, Aanshi Barot	
10 July	Rangaaa	Crime	Shrikant Chaudhary	Mehool Desai, Gaurang Anand, Aarti Bhavsar, Amar Kubavat, Jay Rami	
17 July	Shatir	Crime	Rupin Shah	Makrand Shukla, Mamta Soni, Vidhi Shah, Dharmesh Vyas, Ravi Omprakash Rao,	
17 July	Mastini Pathshala 2	Comedy	Sunil Vaghela	Ansh Choksi, Krushna Joshi, Viransh Parmar, Krunal Bhatt, Kanu Desai, Komal Patel, Nitish J Parekh	
24 July	Layak Nalayakk	Comedy	Tannmay Gopal Sengupta	Hiten Kumar, Hitu Kanodia, Ojas Raval, Asmit Patel, Katha Patel, Shekhar Shukla, Sunil Visrani	
24 July	Kaano	Devotional	Utpal Modi	Prachi Thaker, Harsh Kavithiya, Alpana Majmudar, Kiran Joshi, Puja Soni, Vinay Dave, Hetal Gautami	
30 July	Hip Hip Hurray	Comedy	Nishith Brahmbhatt	Sanjay Goradia, Smit Pandya, Chetan Daiya, Hemin Trivedi, Bhavini Jani, Heena Jaikishan, Vivan Bhagat	
30 July	Maaran	Thriller	Abhishek Jain	Yash Soni, Deeksha Joshi, Shruhad Goswami, Tarjanee Bhadla, Dhairya Thakkar, Abhinay Banker, Vaishakh Rathodd	
7 August	Get Set Go	Action	Arnav Kumar	Deepak Tijori, Jinal Belani, Bhaumik Sampat, Raunaq Kamdar, Bhavya Gandhi, Om Bhatt, Sharad Sharma, Dharmendra Gohil, Muni Jha	
28 August	Tom & Cherry	Crime	Dharmesh S. Mehta	Siddharth Randeria, Dhanya Doshi	
4 September	Asambhauuu	Drama	Parth Trivedi	Raunaq Kamdar, Mitra Gadhavi, Shivani Bhardwaj, Tatsat Munshi, Chetan Daiya	
11 September	Pidha Pachhi	Comedy, Drama	Nishith Brahmbhatt	Akash Pandya, Smit Pandya, Hemin Trivedi, Akash Trivedi, Tarjanee Bhadla	
18 September	Firki	Comedy	Dharmesh Mehta	Johnny Lever, Vatsal Sheth, Vrajesh Hirjee, Esha Kansara & Anang Desai	
18 September	Chatni	Comedy	Sandeep Patel	Malhar Thakar, Puja Joshi	
25 September	Mitrata	Comedy	Oneel Karnik	Viraj Ghelani, Deep Vaidya, Vishal Parekh, Vishwaa Joshi	

== October–December ==
Opening	Name	Genre	Director	Cast	Ref.
9 October	Abhayam	Drama	Rajesh Bhatt	Prinal Oberoi, Bimal Trivedi, Vijay Desai	
16 October	Andhkar	Suspense Thriller	Hiren Jadvani	Ekta Savani, Vishal Solanki, Chetan Daiya,Rinkal Leuva,Ishika Shirsath,Kalpesh Rajgor,Pankaj Pathakji, Pravin Pan Patil,	
23 October	Damru	Comedy	Hardik J Pareekh	Sanjay Goradia, Nakshraj, Nirav Vaidya, Nirali Oza, Saurabh Rajyaguru, Sanjay Galsar, Maulik Chauhan, Hemang Dave, Makrand Shukla, Nishchay Rana, Vishal Vaishya	
23 October	Chor No. 1	Comedy	Rakesh Shah	Shrey Maradiya, Rishi Jani, Parth Modi, Aanchal Shah, Archan Trivedi	
23 October	Kamaal Chhe Tu Kaku	Comedy	Satyam Raj	Naman Gor, Aakash Zala, Bhavini Jani, Nisarg Brahmbhatt, Kinnal Nayak	
23 October	Chhal Kapat	Crime	Satyam Raj	Bhavika Khatri, Dharam Savlani, Kinnal Nayak	
30 October	Kaik To Kar	Family Drama	Bhagvan Vaghela	Viraaj Vaghela, Sweta Sen, Mamta Soni, Makrand Shukla, Aakash Zala, Javed Bloch ,Gaurang JD, Vishal Vaishya	
30 October	Tari Mari Laganio	Comedy	Sudhir Kharwa, Shailesh Rahane	Shubham Patil, Mukhi Nivedita, Tanmay Popat, Hitesh Waghela, Sanchet Modh, Jigar Nayak, Simit Bhavsar	
30 October	Baap Re Baap	Comedy	Bhavesh Gorasiya	Bharat Thakkar, Aanshi Barot, Kruzin Singhania, Jeetendra Thakkar, Rurook Dave, Aaudarya Vora	
6 November	Bhai Beej	Drama	K. K. Makwana	Vikram Thakor, Bhumi Gour, Chetan Daiya	
20 November	Ruff and Tuff Kanya	Comedy, Drama	Yash Vaishnav	Hiten Kumar, Ravi Gohil, Yukti Randeria, Firoz Irani, Niilam Paanchal, Sonali Lele Desai, Anurag Prapanna, Ragi JAni	
27 November	King of Salangpur	Drama	Prashant Deshaval	Sagar Panchal, Mayur Soneji, Akash Pandya, Rj Saloni, Bhushan Bhatt, Bhavin Mehta	
25 December	Hun Ane Anand	Drama	Jay Bhatt	Monal Gajjar, Gaurav Paswala, Hemang Dave, Khushbu Trivedi, Riddhi Nayak Shukla, Dharmesh Vyas	

== See also ==
- Gujarati cinema
- List of Gujarati films
- List of Gujarati films of 2025
- List of highest-grossing Gujarati films
