= Chatni (film) =

2026 Indian Gujarati drama film

- Chatni
- Directed by: Saandeep Patel
- Written by: Harsh Shodhan
- Screenplay by: Harsh Shodhan
- Story by: Harsh Shodhan, Saandeep Patel
- Produced by: Prashant Modi; Amit Vedawala; Pinky Vedawala
- Starring: Malhar Thakar; Puja Joshi; Prashant Barot; Hetal Mody; Smit Joshi
- Cinematography: Tapan Vyas
- Edited by: Nirav Panchal
- Music by: Rahul Munjariya
- Production companies: Eforu Entertainment Limited; Buddhipriyay Pictures LLP
- Distributed by: Rupam Entertainment Pvt Ltd
- Release date: 18 September 2026
- Running time: 165 minutes
- Country: India
- Language: Gujarati

Chatni is a 2026 Indian Gujarati-language family drama film directed by Saandeep Patel. The film stars Malhar Thakar, Puja Joshi, Prashant Barot, Hetal Mody and Smit Joshi.. The film is produced by Prashant Modi, Amit Vedawala and Pinky Vedawala, under the banner of Eforu Entertainment Ltd in association with Buddhipriyay Pictures LLP. The film was released in theatres on 18 September 2026.

== Plot ==
A young engineer abandons his secure job to continue his family's 115-year farsan tradition, working to transform their classic chutney recipe into a contemporary brand while overcoming obstacles and family skepticism.

== Cast ==
- Malhar Thakar as Deval
- Puja Joshi as Kajal
- Prashant Barot as Kalu Kaka
- Hetal Mody as Jaanki
- Smit Joshi as Lalo

== Music ==
The film's music was composed by Rahul Munjariya. The romantic song "Pankhida", sung by Jigardan Gadhavi with lyrics by Milind Gadhavi, was released on 7 September 2026. The song features Malhar Thakar and Puja Joshi.

== Production ==
Chatni was directed by Saandeep Patel and written by Harsh Shodhan and Saandeep Patel. The film was produced by Eforu Entertainment in association with Buddhipriyay Pictures LLP, a production company established by Malhar Thakar and Puja Joshi. It was the first film produced under the Buddhipriyay Pictures banner.

Filming was completed in January 2026. The cast and crew marked the completion of shooting with a celebration on the set.

== Soundtrack ==
Chatni

Soundtrack album by Rahul Munjariya
- Released: 2026
- Studio: Eforu Entertainment Ltd
- Genre: Feature film soundtrack
- Length: 26:37
- Language: Gujarati
- Label: Eforu Entertainment Ltd
External audio
- Chatni Full Album on JioSaavn

=== Tracklist ===
All lyrics are written by Milind Gadhavi, Darshan Bazigar, Sairam Dave, Tushar Shukla, Harsh Shodhan; all music is composed by Rahul Munjariya.

Track listing
No.	Title	Lyrics	Music	Singer(s)	Length
1.	"Pankhida"	Milind Gadhavi	Rahul Munjariya	Jigardan Gadhavi	06.19
2.	"Chal Futt"	Darshan Bazigar	Rahul Munjariya	Kaushik Bharwad	03.07
3.	"Maher Karo"	Sairam Dave	Rahul Munjariya	Osman Mir	04.23
4.	"Gazal"	Milind Gadhavi	Rahul Munjariya	Amir O Mir	03.96
5.	"Lili Vaadi"	Tushar Shukla	Rahul Munjariya	Raj Gadhavi	04.08
6.	"Itihas"	Harsh Shodhan	Rahul Munjariya	Bhumik Shah	04.85
Total length:					26.37

== Marketing and release ==
The film's first-look poster was released on 31 July 2026, announcing its theatrical release date. The official teaser and trailer were released ahead of the film's release.

Chatni was released in theatres on 18 September 2026.

== Reception ==
VTV Gujarati reviewed the film and highlighted its focus on family relationships, traditional business and the differences between generations. The review discussed the film's story about a young man attempting to modernise his family's longstanding farsan business.

== See also ==
- List of Gujarati films of 2026
- List of Gujarati films
- Gujarati cinema
