= Vanilla ice cream (disambiguation) =

Vanilla ice cream is a type of ice cream flavored with vanilla.

Vanilla Ice Cream may also refer to:

- Vanilla Ice Cream, a song from the musical She Loves Me
- "Vanilla Ice Cream", the internal codename of Android 15, a release of the Android operating system
- Vanilla Ice Cream (film), a 2024 Gujarati-language film
