= Ananya Birla =

Indian singer-songwriter and entrepreneur (born 1994)

Ananya Shree Birla
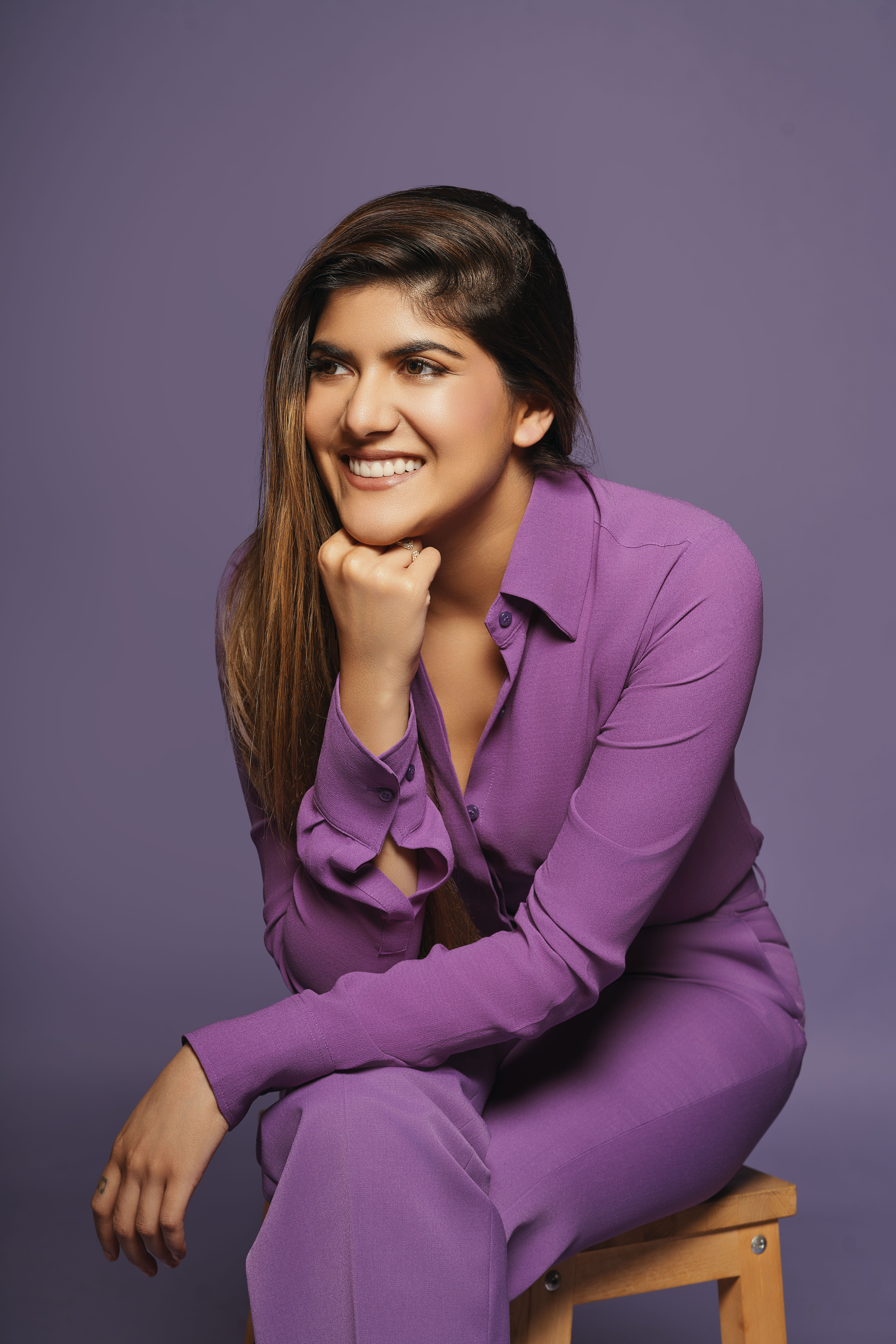
- Ananya in 2022

Background information
- Born: Ananya Shree Birla; 17 July 1994 (age 32); Mumbai, Maharashtra India
- Education: University of Oxford (BA)
- Genres: Pop; Electropop
- Occupations: Businesswoman; Singer-songwriter
- Instruments: Vocals; Guitar; Santoor; Piano
- Years active: 2016–present
- Label: Universal Music India
- Website: Official website

Ananyashree Birla (born 17 July 1994) is an Indian businesswoman and former singer-songwriter. She is the daughter of multi billionaire industrialist Kumar Mangalam Birla.

== Early life ==
AnanyaShree Birla is the eldest daughter of Kumar Mangalam Birla and Neerja Birla. She is a sixth-generation scion of the Birla family, whose place of origin is Pilani. She developed an interest in music at an early age, learning to play the santoor at the age of eleven. She attended American School of Bombay, and later studied economics and management at the University of Oxford for her bachelor's degree, which she was awarded in 2011.

== Career ==
=== Business career ===
Birla founded Svatantra Microfin Private Limited at the age of 17.

In 2016, Birla became the founder and CEO of Ikai Asai, a luxury e-commerce platform. The same year, Forbes named her one of Asia's Women to Watch.

=== Music career ===
While at university, Birla started singing and playing the guitar at pubs and clubs. She also began writing her own music. Her debut single, "Livin’ the Life", was co-written, and produced, by JimBeanz (who previously collaborated with Nelly Furtado, Cheryl Tweedy and Demi Lovato) and was recorded and produced at a studio in Philadelphia. A remix by Dutch DJ Afrojack of "Livin’ the Life" makes Birla the first Indian artist to get a worldwide release through PM:AM Recordings and hit over 14 million views on YouTube as of June 2017.

She released her next single, "Meant to be" in July 2017, which was subsequently certified Platinum as per the Indian Music Industry (IMI) recognised criteria for certifications. This makes Birla the first Indian artist with an English single to go platinum. In January 2017, she supported Coldplay at the Global Citizen Festival.

She released her single "Hold On" on 1 March 2018. On 7 June 2018, she released her fourth single "Circles". On 17 January 2019, she released her 5th single and 1st song of 2019 "Better", which was viewed 4 million times on YouTube within 2 days of its release.

She released her debut EP Fingerprint in May 2019, via UMG and Island Records UK. It included "Blackout" featuring Vector and Wurld, which was one of the first collaborations between major artists from India and Nigeria.

In September 2019, Birla released ‘Day Goes By’ with Sean Kingston, who she met when they toured in India together.

In 2020, she signed with Maverick Management in Los Angeles. Later that year, she released "Let There Be Love" and "Everybody's Lost" becoming the first Indian artist to be featured on an American national top 40 pop radio show, Sirius XM Hits.

She has performed at some of the biggest music events in Asia including Global Citizen, Oktoberfest, and Sunburn, Asia's biggest electronic music festival, and has toured with Wiz Khalifa.

Birla's "Hindustani Way" is the official CHEER SONG for the Indian Olympic at the 2021 Olympics, composed by A. R. Rahman. In May 2024, Birla announced her retirement from music.

=== Acting career ===
In 2022, Birla made her acting debut after being featured in the song "Inaam" from Rudra: The Edge of Darkness, a streaming television series. She made her full-fledged acting debut in 2023, with a spy thriller titled Shlok: The Desi Sherlock, directed by Kunal Kohli.

== Artistry ==
=== Musical style ===
Her work is often characterized as dance-pop and EDM. However, she has experimented with different music genres. She has stated, "Music is not a career for me. It's who I am. It's the most honest part of me."

=== Influences ===
Early in her career, she cited the works of Eminem and Kurt Cobain as influences—for both their work and the way they performed, as well as the impact they had on an audience. She said, "Cobain and Eminem are worlds apart, but they share the ability to be brutally honest in their music."

=== Songwriting ===
Birla's musical journey began as a child with the santoor. At 13, she had switched to singing, and around the same time, she started writing poetry, which led to songwriting. During her college days at Oxford, she taught herself the guitar, calling it "a great companion during a tough time." She was enrolled in an economics and management programme during the day and performed at London open mics at night. "I realised this is what I want to do for the rest of my life. Seeing people react to my singing was so satisfying and addictive."

== Campaign work ==
While in England, Birla became aware of a student helpline that helped young people suffering from anxiety and depression. After university, she returned to India and, along with her mother, set up a mental health initiative called MPower aiming to stamp out the stigma towards people with mental illness across India. MPower is also responsible for opening a treatment centre for children suffering from mental health conditions.

In 2020, in response to the COVID-19 pandemic, Mpower tied up with the Government of Maharashtra and Brihanmumbai Municipal Corporation (BMC) to launch a 24x7 free helpline. 45 thousand people had called within 2 months of the launch.

She is an ambassador for the National Alliance on Mental Illness, the United States’ largest grassroots mental health organisation dedicated to building better lives for the millions of Americans affected by mental illness.

She launched the Ananya Birla Foundation in 2020 with a COVID-19 relief project that involved providing menstruation kits, PPE kits, and protective equipment to women and hospitals across Maharashtra. The Foundation also worked to provide essentials to migrant workers during the pandemic.

In July 2024, Ananya Birla collaborated with the Institute of Human Behaviour and Allied Sciences (IHBAS) to enhance mental health and career support for students in Delhi. This initiative trained psychologists in therapeutic techniques, including art-based therapy, enabling children to express themselves through creative outlets. The program aimed to reach over 30,000 students by March 2025

In April 2025, the Ananya Birla Foundation organized the 'Mpowering Minds Summit 2025' to drive urgent reforms in youth mental health. The summit aimed to strengthen mental health infrastructure, eliminate stigma, and integrate mental health education into school curricula.

== Discography ==
=== Extended plays ===
List of extended plays
Title	Details	Tracklisting				
Title	Details	No.	Title	Writer(s)	Producer(s)	Length
Fingerprint	Released: 17 May 2019; Label: Island Records UK, Universal Music India; Format: Digital download, streaming	1.	"Blackout" (featuring Vector and WurlD)			2:21
Fingerprint	Released: 17 May 2019; Label: Island Records UK, Universal Music India; Format: Digital download, streaming	2.	"All Night Long."			3:44
Fingerprint	Released: 17 May 2019; Label: Island Records UK, Universal Music India; Format: Digital download, streaming	3.	"Love Suicide."			3:25
Fingerprint	Released: 17 May 2019; Label: Island Records UK, Universal Music India; Format: Digital download, streaming	4.	"Disappear"			3:13
Fingerprint	Released: 17 May 2019; Label: Island Records UK, Universal Music India; Format: Digital download, streaming	Total length:				12:44

=== Singles ===
- Livin The Life (2016)
- Livin' The Life (Afrojack Remix) (2017)
- Meant To Be (2017)
- Hold On (2018)
- Circles (2018)
- Better (2019)
- Unstoppable (2019)
- Blackout (2019)
- Day Goes By (feat. Sean Kingston) (2019)
- Let There Be Love (2020) (2023
- Everybody's Lost (2020)
- Hindustani Way (with A. R. Rahman) (2021)
- When I'm Alone (2021)
- Give Me Up (2021)
- Deny Me (2021)
- Do It Anyway (2021)
- Inaam (feat. Audio Salvage Collective) (2022)
- Beymaaniyan (feat. Ikka) (2022)
- Teri Meri Kahani (2022)
- Kya Karein (feat. Ankur Tewari) (2022)
- Yaari (2023)
- Dil Karda (feat. Kumaar & Rahul Sathu) (2023)
- Caught Up (2023)
- Caught Up (feat. L.A.X) (2023)
- Sheeshe Ka Dil (feat. OAFF & Savera) (2023)
- Brave Together (2023)
- Cuffed (Jo Tha Mila) (feat. Offset) (2023)
- Jazbaati Hai Dil (with Armaan Malik) (2024)
- 24 (2025)

=== Film ===
- Do Aur Do Pyaar (2024)
- Ruff and Tuff Kanya as Producer (2026)
