= Locha Laapsi =

2024 film directed by Sachin Brahmbhatt

- Official Poster
- Directed by: Sachin Brahmbhatt
- Written by: Maulin Parmar (Story, Screenplay, Dialogues); Sachin Brahmbhatt (Screenplay)
- Produced by: Jeegar Chauhan; Malhar Thakar
- Starring: Malhar Thakar; Chirag Vohra; Vaibhavi Upadhyay; Chetan Dhanani
- Cinematography: Himanshu Dubey
- Edited by: Nirav Panchal
- Music by: Rahul Munjariya
- Production companies: Jeegar Chauhan Productions; Ticket Window Entertainment
- Distributed by: Panorama Studios
- Release date: 20 September 2024
- Running time: 111.00 minutes
- Country: India
- Language: Gujarati

Locha Laapsi is a 2024 Gujarati comedy thriller, directed by Sachin Brahmbhatt and written by Maulin Parmar. It stars Malhar Thakar, Chirag Vohra, Vaibhavi Upadhyay who demise in car accident in 2023, Chetan Dhanani and others. The film is produced by Jeegar Chauhan & Malhar Thakar with co produced by Saheb Malik, Vaidehi Chintan Desai, & Shital Tejas Patel. under the banner of Jeegar Chauhan Production & Ticket Window Entertainment. The film will be distributed by Panorama Studios.

== Plot ==
Bhaskar Joshi, a determined engineer, is on his way to Kutch-Bhuj to showcase his latest venture. But when his cab gets a flat tire in the middle of nowhere, Bhaskar's journey takes a wild turn. He accepts a lift from a mysterious stranger, only to discover that his new driver is harboring a dark secret-a dead body in the trunk. As the tension mounts, Bhaskar is joined by another unwitting passenger: the wife of a police officer, who also hitches a ride. Caught between the terrifying reality of the situation and his own fear, Bhaskar must navigate this nerve-wracking journey without tipping off the suspicious man who holds all the power-and a gun. Will Bhaskar find a way out of this deadly predicament, or is he trapped in a ride straight to disaster?

== Cast ==
- Malhar Thakar as Bhaskar
- Chirag Vohra as Shashvat
- Vaibhavi Upadhyay as Mishruta
- Chetan Dhanani as Raghuveer
- Nilesh Pandya as Gantra
- Chirag Bhatt as Puncture Man
- Yash Metha as Police Inspector
- Kamlesh Parmar as Constable at check post
- Jayraj Freeman as ASI
- Amit Mishra as ASI
- Kartik Dave as ASI
- Ilesh Shah as Constable
- Kartavya Shah as Crime Branch Officer
- Rajnikant Thakar as Police Commissioner
- Bansi Rajput as News Anchor

== Production ==
The film was shot at various locations in Gujarat. The production design has been carried out by Jay Shihora & Art direction by Mit Soni. Casting director – Bhavin Raval has selected the actors based on the requirement of script. Costume has been taken care by Ameel Macwan. The music of the film has been given by Rahul Munjariya, Lyrics given by Bhargav Purohit. Swaroop Khan has given his voices for the song in the film.

== Soundtrack ==
Locha Laapsi

Soundtrack album by Rahul Munjariya
- Released: 2024
- Genre: Feature film soundtrack
- Length: 3:21
- Language: Gujarati
- Label: Jeegar Chauhan Productions

All lyrics are written by Bhargav Purohit; all music is composed by Rahul Munjariya.

Track listing
No.	Title	Singer(s)	Length
1.	"Locha Laapsi Title Track"	Swaroop Khan	3:21
Total length:			3:21

== Marketing and releases ==
The film has completed and artist of the film have announced the wrap of the film. release date announced on August 30, 2024. The official poster released on September 1, 2024. The trailer of the film is released on September 6, 2024. The film is set to hit the cinemas on September 20, 2024.

== See also ==
- List of Gujarati films of 2024
