= Saatam Aatham =

- Directed by: Shital Shah, assistant director Jayesh Parmar, Sandip Sharma, Krishn Acharya, Dhruv Mewada, Vishvas Rastrapal
- Written by: Neeraj Pandey
- Produced by: Hina Shah, Shaina Shah
- Starring: Shital Shah; Parikshit Tamaliya; Denisha Ghumra
- Cinematography: Pratap Rout
- Edited by: Praveen Kathikuloth
- Music by: Advait Nemlekar
- Production company: Friday Filmworks
- Distributed by: Rupam Entertainment Pvt. Ltd.
- Release date: 1 July 2022
- Running time: 117 minutes
- Country: India
- Language: Gujarati

Saatam Aatham is a 2022 Indian Gujarati thriller drama film written by Neeraj Pandey and directed by Shital Shah and produced by Hina Shah & Shaina Shah. It stars Shital Shah, Parikshit Tamaliya, and Denisha Ghumra. The film was released on 1 July 2022 under the banner of Friday Filmworks and Limelight Pictures. The film was reviewed positively by critics.

== Plot ==
Munna, a contract killer, falls in love and becomes a reformed man by quitting his profession. But soon his life takes a turn.

== Cast ==
- Shital Shah as Chitra
- Parikshit Tamaliya as Munna
- Denisha Ghumra as Vishakha
- Rajan Thakar as Dipak
- Ankit Joshipura as Inspector Yadav
- Rakesh Pujara as Salimbhai

Parth Oza performed cameos in "Gokul Avo Girdhari" song.
