= Nasoor (2024 film) =

2024 Indian psychological thriller film

- Official film poster
- Directed by: Rishil Joshi
- Written by: Kajal Mehta
- Produced by: Manoj Ahir
- Starring: Hitu Kanodia; Niilam Paanchal; Denisha Ghumra; Heena Jaikishan; Hemin Trivedi; Vaishakh Ratanben
- Cinematography: Suman Sahu
- Edited by: Parth Y. Bhatt
- Music by: Maulik Mehta
- Production company: Storytell Films
- Distributed by: Rupam Entertainment Pvt. Ltd.
- Release date: 23 February 2024
- Running time: 116 minutes
- Country: India
- Language: Gujarati

Nasoor (Gujarati: નાસૂર) is a 2024 Indian Gujarati psychological thriller film directed by Rishil Joshi, written by Kajal Mehta and produced by Manoj Ahir. It stars Hitu Kanodia, Niilam Paanchal, Denisha Ghumra, and Heena Jaikishan in a lead role. It was released on 23 February 2024.

== Plot ==
Harsh Vardhan is a man who, despite reaching great success, feels lost and without purpose. His desperate search for meaning makes him overlook the important aspects of life. The story depicts his struggle as he chases wealth, only to find that he is missing out on what truly matters, leading to significant consequences. This reflects the ongoing struggles and unhealed wounds of modern life.

== Cast ==
- Hitu Kanodia as Harsh Vardhan Seth
- Niilam Paanchal as Jolly Seth
- Denisha Ghumra as Chhabbi
- Heena Jaikishan as Roshani
- Hemin Trivedi as Parag Policy
- Vaishakh Ratanben as Naitik
- Vishal Thakkar as Rahul
- Jignesh Modi as Boss
- Aakanksha Panchal as Naitik Wife

== Production ==
The shooting of the film commenced on 6 October 2023. Niilam Paanchal finished her dubbing on 13 December 2023.

== Marketing and release ==
The official trailer of the film was released on 13 February 2024. The film was released on 23 February 2024 in Gujarat.

== Reception ==
Kanksha Vasavada from The Times of India rated it 3 stars out of 5, praising the bold concept, strong direction, background score, and cast performances. However, she criticized the film's slow buildup and less crisp second half. Rachana Joshi from Gujarati Mid Day rated it 2.5 stars out of 5, praising the acting, camera work, and story, but criticizing the film's slow pace and background story development.

== See also ==
- List of Gujarati films of 2024
