= Pidha Pachhi =

2026 Indian Gujarati comedy film

- Official Poster
- Directed by: Nishith Brahmbhatt
- Written by: Rushikesh Thakkar
- Produced by: Anil Prannath Mehta
- Starring: Akash Pandya; Smit Pandya; Hemin Trivedi; Akash Trivedi; Tarjanee Bhadla
- Cinematography: Pratik Parmar
- Edited by: Hiren Chitroda
- Music by: Gaurav Dhola; DJ Kwid
- Production company: Sarovar Arts
- Distributed by: Rupam Entertainment
- Release date: 11 September 2026
- Running time: 130 minutes
- Country: India
- Language: Gujarati

Pidha Pachhi (Gujarati: પીધા પછી) is a 2026 Indian Gujarati comedy-drama film directed by Nishith Brahmbhatt and written by Rushikesh Thakkar. It stars Akash Pandya, Smit Pandya, Hemin Trivedi, Akash Trivedi, Tarjanee Bhadla and others. The film is produced by Anil Prannath Mehta from Sarovar Arts. The film was released in theaters on 11 September 2026.

== Plot ==
Aditya and his three friends go on a bachelor trip. After an incident one night, they struggle to understand what happened and become involved in a series of unexpected situations.

== Cast ==
- Akash Pandya
- Smit Pandya
- Hemin Trivedi
- Akash Trivedi
- Tarjanee Bhadla
- Dhaval Barbhaya
- Garima Yadav
- Vrajana Pandya
- Vishal Vaishya
- Nirav Kumar
- Bhargav Parmar
- Viktoria Brezniakova
- Prashant Barot
- Kalpana Gagdekar
- Khushi Rajput
- Pankti Patel

== Soundtrack ==
Pidha Pachhi

Soundtrack album
- Released: 2026
- Genre: Feature film soundtrack
- Length: 9:25
- Language: Gujarati
- Label: Saregama Gujarati
External audio
- Pidha Pachhi Full Album on JioSaavn

=== Track listing ===
All lyrics are written by Manu Rabari, Janaki Gadhavi; all music is composed by Gaurav Dhola, DJ Kwid.

Track listing
No.	Title	Lyrics	Music	Singer(s)	Length
1.	"Ghammar Ghaghro"	Manu Rabari	Gaurav Dhola	Jyotica Tangari	3:29
2.	"Radha Aavo To Ramiye Raas"	Manu Rabari	DJ Kwid, Gaurav Dhola	Umesh Barot, Shruti Pathak	3:02
3.	"Boom Boom"	Janaki Gadhavi	DJ Kwid, Gaurav Dhola	Lee D’souza	2:54
Total length:					9:25

== Production ==
The film was shot in Ahmedabad over six days, followed by 19 days of filming in Thailand, including Bangkok.

== Marketing and release ==
The teaser was released on 6 August 2026, followed by the trailer on 24 August 2026. The first song from the film was released on 27 August 2026.

== Reception ==
Abdul Kadir of All Tenvow rated Pidha Pachhi 6 out of 10, describing it as a light comedy-drama centred on a group of friends on a trip. He praised its humour, the chemistry among the friends and its simple, relatable premise, while noting that the story becomes familiar and predictable in parts. He also observed that the film's pacing slows in the middle and that the mystery element makes the second half feel somewhat stretched. Kadir concluded that the film works as a casual one-time watch rather than a major theatrical outing.

== See also ==
- List of Gujarati films of 2026
- List of Gujarati films
