= Dharpakad =

2026 Gujarati film by Anish Shah

- Official Poster
- ધરપકડ
- Directed by: Anish Shah
- Written by: Anish Shah; Ankit Gor; Himalay Dave
- Produced by: Raahul Badal; Jay Shah; Anish Shah
- Starring: Mallhar Thakar; Prashant Barot; Shruhad Goswami; Pratik Rathod; Jay Bhatt
- Cinematography: Dhrupad Shukla
- Edited by: Prayagraj Chouksi
- Music by: Japjisingh Valecha
- Production companies: Indira Motion Pictures; November Films India
- Distributed by: Rupam Entertainment Pvt. Ltd.
- Release date: 15 May 2026
- Running time: 117 minutes
- Country: India
- Language: Gujarati

Dharpakad is a 2026 Gujarati crime thriller film directed by Anish Shah. The story is written by Anish Shah and Himalay Dave, with screenplay by Anish Shah and Ankit Gor, and dialogues by Ankit Gor. It stars Mallhar Thakar, Prashant Barot, Shruhad Goswami, Pratik Rathod, and Jay Bhatt in lead roles. It is produced by Raahul Badal, Jay Shah, and Anish Shah under the banners of Indira Motion Pictures and November Films India. The film is scheduled for theatrical release on 15 May 2026, distributed by Rupam Entertainment Pvt. Ltd.

== Plot ==
Arjun sets out to find the scammers who duped his father. The deeper he digs into the digital fraud network, the more complicated things become.

== Cast ==
The cast includes:

- Mallhar Thakar as Arjun Shah
- Prashant Barot as Bhadresh Shah
- Shruhad Goswami as Bunty
- Pratik Rathod as Himmat Rana
- Jay Bhatt as Jayraj

== Production ==
The film is shot across locations in Gujarat. Production design is handled by Chirayu Bodas with art direction by Shailee Sheth. Costumes are designed by Komal Patel. Sound design is by Urmil Pandya. The background score and music are composed by Japjisingh Valecha with lyrics by Bhargav Purohit. Action sequences are directed by Iliyas Shaikh. Visual effects and graphics are by Saumil Patel.

== Release ==
The announcement of the film has been made on 10 April 2026. Dharpakad released in theatres on 15 May 2026.

== Reception ==
Divya Bhaskar reviewed it positively rated it 3.5/5 stars. VTV Gujarati also reviewed positively calling it a good combination of social message and entertainment.

== See also ==
- List of Gujarati films of 2026
