= Godhra train burning =

2002 train arson attack in Gujarat, India

- Location: 22°46′41″N 73°35′52″E; Godhra, Gujarat, India
- Date: 27 February 2002; 7:43 a.m.
- Target: Hindu Karsevaks returning from Ayodhya
- Deaths: 59
- Injuries: 48

The Godhra train burning occurred on the morning of 27 February 2002, when 59 Hindu pilgrims and karsevaks (religious volunteers) returning from Ayodhya were killed in a fire inside the Sabarmati Express near the Godhra railway station in Gujarat, India. The cause of the fire remains disputed. The Gujarat riots, during which Muslims were the targets of widespread and severe violence, took place shortly afterward.

The Nanavati-Mehta Commission, appointed by the state government in the immediate aftermath of the event, concluded in 2008 that the burning was a pre-planned act of arson committed by a thousand-strong Muslim mob. In contrast, the Banerjee Commission, a one-member panel instituted in 2004 by then Rail Minister Lalu Prasad Yadav of the Ministry of Railways, characterized the fire as an accident in its 2006 report. However, the Gujarat High Court later ruled that the commission's appointment was unconstitutional and quashed all its findings. An independent investigation by a non-governmental organization also supported the theory that the fire was accidental. Scholars remain skeptical about the claims of arson.

In February 2011, the trial court convicted 31 Muslims for the train burning, relying heavily on the Nanavati-Mehta Commission report as evidence. In October 2017, the Gujarat High Court upheld the convictions.

== 27 February 2002 incident ==
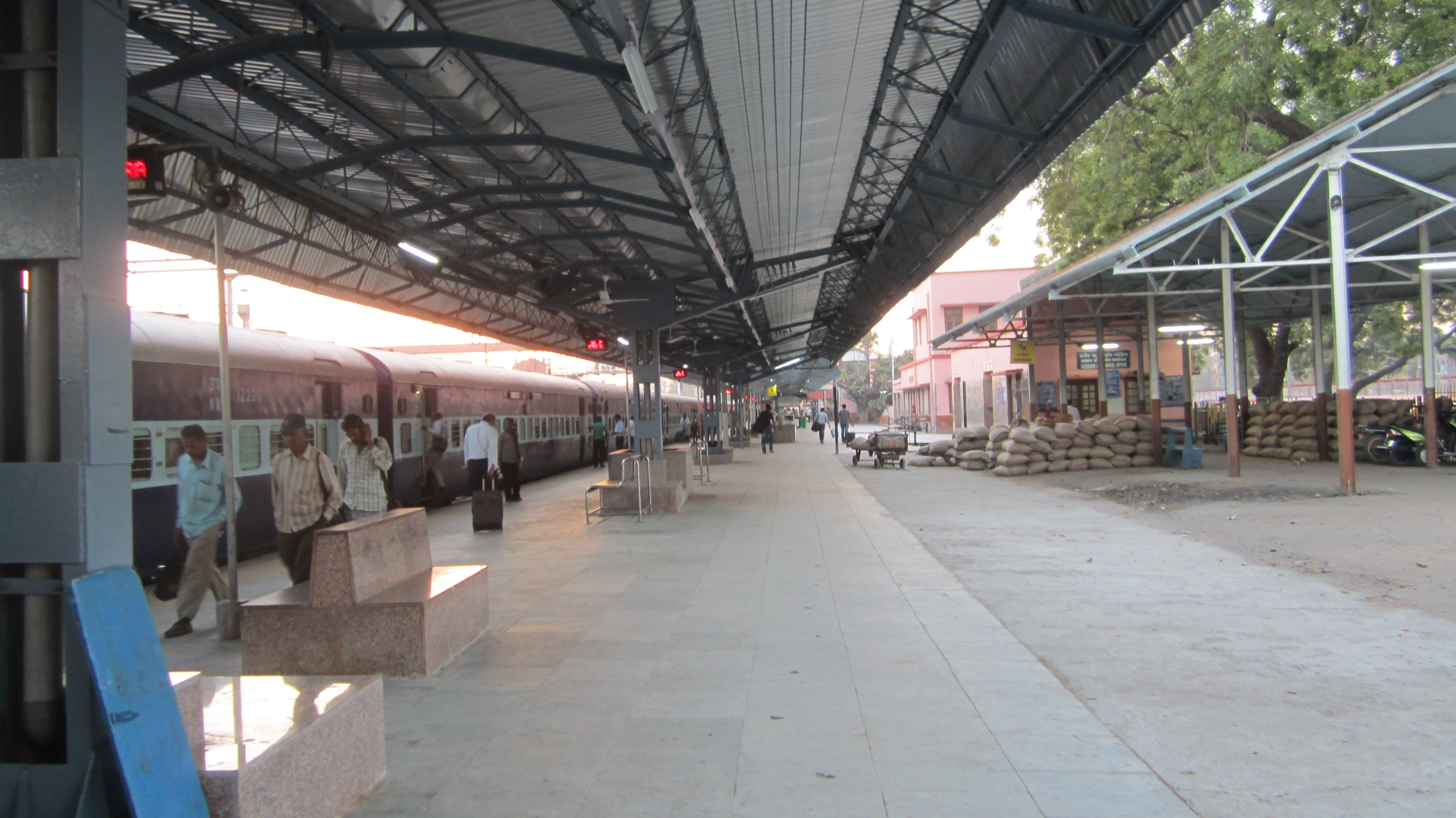
The platform at Godhra Junction. The incident took place a short distance away.

In February 2002, thousands of devotees of Rama (known as "Ramsevaks" or "Kar Sevaks") traveled from Gujarat to Ayodhya at the behest of the Vishva Hindu Parishad to participate in a ceremony called the Purnahuti Maha Yagna. On 25 February, 1,700 people, a mix of pilgrims and karsevaks, boarded the Sabarmati Express, which was bound for Ahmedabad. On 27 February 2002, the train made a scheduled stop at Godhra around four hours late, at 7:43 am. As the train began to leave the platform, someone pulled the emergency brake, causing it to stop near the signal point. The train driver later stated that the brake chain had been pulled multiple times, as indicated by the instruments in his cabin.

According to one narrative, the train was attacked by a mob of around 2,000 people. After some stone-pelting, four train coaches were set on fire, trapping many people inside. Fifty-nine people, including 27 women and 10 children, were burned to death, while 48 others were injured. J. Mahapatra, the Additional Director General of Gujarat Police, stated that "miscreants had kept petrol-soaked rags ready for use much before the train had arrived at Godhra." In September 2008, the Nanavati-Mehta Commission submitted the first part of its report, which concluded that the burning of the S-6 coach of the Sabarmati Express near Godhra railway station was a "planned conspiracy."

The cause of the fire remains disputed. In 2003, the Concerned Citizens Tribunal concluded that the fire had been an accident.

Several independent commentators also concluded that the fire was almost certainly an accident, noting that the initial cause of the blaze was never conclusively determined. Historian Ainslie Thomas Embree stated that the official account of the train attack—that it was organized and carried out by people under orders from Pakistan—was entirely baseless. Scholar Martha Nussbaum similarly challenged this narrative, stating that several inquiries found the fire to be the result of an accident rather than a planned conspiracy.

Forewarning of the violent incident was also noted. Additional director general of police G. C. Raigar had informed prior to the Godhra train burning that the Vishwa Hindu Parishad (VHP) activists could instigate communal violence. He was removed from his post after he provided evidence to the media outlets to show that the state could be compromised by VHP activists who were arriving to and from Ayodhya.

== Inquiries ==
=== Forensic Science Laboratory report ===
A study conducted by the Gujarat Forensic Science Laboratory concluded that the fire was caused by inflammable liquid poured into the coach by the attackers. Additionally, the report indicated that the fire started from inside the coach, which explains the minimal scorching on the exterior below the windows.

=== Nanavati-Mehta commission ===
==== Appointment ====
On 6 March 2002, the Gujarat government established a commission of inquiry to investigate the incident and submit a report. The commission was initially chaired by retired Gujarat High Court judge K.G. Shah as its sole member. However, Shah's alleged closeness to Narendra Modi drew sharp criticism from victims, human rights organizations, and political parties, leading to demands for the appointment of a Supreme Court judge. In response, the government reconstituted the commission as a two-member committee, appointing retired Supreme Court judge G.T. Nanavati to lead it, and it became known as the "Nanavati-Shah Commission."

Shah died in March 2008, just a few months before the committee submitted its first report. On 6 April 2008, the Gujarat High Court appointed retired judge Akshay Kumar Mehta to the committee. During its six-year investigation, the commission examined more than 40,000 documents and the testimonies of over 1,000 witnesses. Although the committee's initial term was three months, it received 22 extensions, until June 2014, to submit its final report.

==== Report ====
In September 2008, the commission submitted "Part I" of its report on the Godhra incident, supporting the theory originally proposed by the Gujarat police. The report identified Maulvi Husain Haji Ibrahim Umarji, a cleric in Godhra, and Nanumiyan, a dismissed Central Reserve Police Force officer, as the "masterminds" behind the operation. The committee's conclusion was supported by a statement from Jabir Binyamin Behra, a criminal in custody at the time, although he later denied making such a statement. Additionally, the report cited the alleged acquisition of 140 liters of petrol hours before the train's arrival, its storage at the guest house of Razzak Kurkur—accused of being a key conspirator—and forensic evidence indicating that fuel was poured on the train coach before it was set on fire. The report concluded that thousands of Muslims from the Signal Falia area attacked the train.

==== Reactions ====
The Communist Party of India (Marxist) and the Indian National Congress objected to the commission's exoneration of the Gujarat government, citing the timing of the report—just months before general elections—as evidence of unfairness. Congress spokesperson Veerappa Moily criticized the premature absolution of the Gujarat government for its alleged complacency in the carnage before the commission's second and final report was released. The CPI(M) argued that the report reinforced communal prejudices. The commission has also been heavily criticized by academics, such as Christophe Jaffrelot, for obstructing the course of justice, supporting the conspiracy theory too quickly, and allegedly ignoring evidence of governmental complicity in the incident.

=== Banerjee investigation ===
==== Appointment and report ====
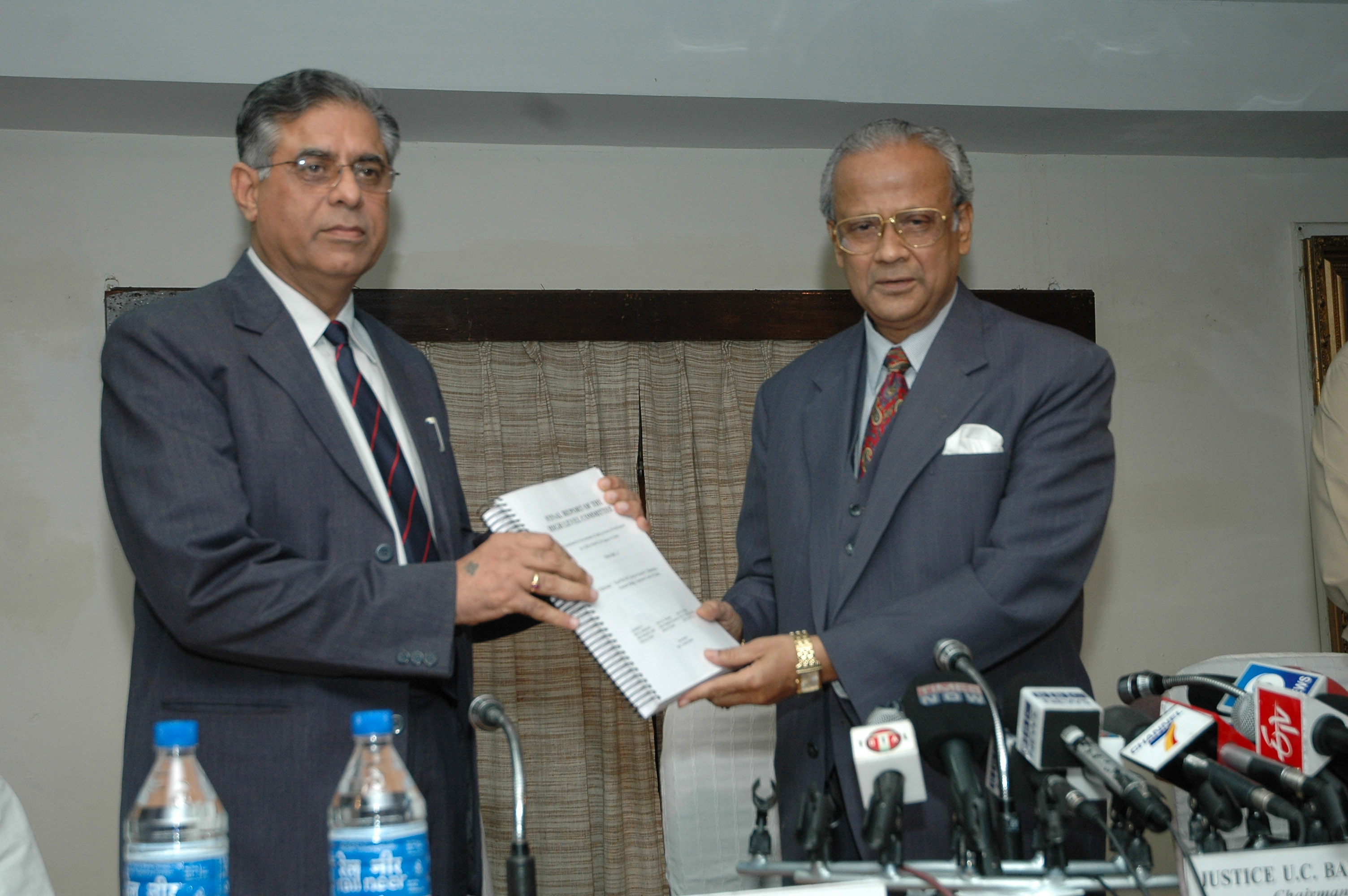
Justice U.C. Banerjee, presenting the final report of enquiry on Godhra fire incident to the Chairman of the Railway Board, J.P. Batra, in New Delhi in 2006

On 17 May 2004, following the victory of the United Progressive Alliance (UPA) in the Indian general election, Lalu Prasad Yadav was appointed as Railway Minister. In September 2004, two and a half years after the train burning, Yadav appointed former Supreme Court Justice Umesh Chandra Banerjee to investigate the incident. In January 2005, Banerjee presented his interim report, which tentatively described the fire as an "accidental fire" after ruling out other theories. He cited a forensic report indicating that the injuries sustained by the victims were consistent only with an "internal fire." The report was also critical of the railways' handling of evidence relevant to the case.

==== High Court judgment ====
Banerjee's findings were challenged in the Gujarat High Court by Neelkanth Tulsidas Bhatia, who was injured in the incident. In October 2006, the court quashed Banerjee's conclusions, ruling that the investigation was "unconstitutional, illegal, and null and void." It declared the formation of the investigation to be a "colorable exercise of power with mala fide intentions" and deemed the argument of an accidental fire to be "opposed to the prima facie accepted facts on record." The High Court also directed that the report should not be tabled in Parliament.

==== Reactions ====
The BJP, then in opposition in the Union Parliament, dismissed the report as an attempt to influence the upcoming Bihar elections. It welcomed the High Court's judgment, viewing it as a setback for the Congress. Lalu Prasad Yadav, then the Minister for Railways, cited the report as evidence that the Narendra Modi government had orchestrated the riots that followed, calling it an exposure of the BJP.

== Trial and court verdict ==
=== Arrests ===
By 28 February 2002, 51 people had been arrested in connection with the incident on charges of arson, rioting, and looting. On 17 March 2002, chief suspect Haji Bilal, a local town councillor and Congress worker, was captured by an anti-terrorist squad in Godhra. The FIR alleged that a 1,540-strong mob attacked the Sabarmati Express on 27 February, shortly after the delayed train left Godhra station. The president of Godhra municipality, Mohammed Hussain Kalota, was arrested in March. Other arrestees included corporators Abdul Razak and Shiraj Abdul Jamesha. Bilal was also alleged to have connections with gang leader Latif and was reported to have visited Karachi, Pakistan, several times.

The SIT filed a charge sheet before First Class Railway Magistrate P.K. Joshi, which spanned more than 500 pages. It stated that 59 people were killed in the S-6 coach of the Sabarmati Express when a mob of around 1,540 unidentified individuals attacked it near Godhra railway station. The 68 people accused in the charge sheet included 57 individuals charged with stoning and setting fire to the train. The charge sheet also noted that the mob attacked the police, prevented the fire brigade from reaching the burning train, and stormed the train a second time. Eleven others were charged as part of this mob. Initially, 107 people were charged, five of whom died while the case was still pending in court. Eight juveniles were tried in a separate court. During the trial, 253 witnesses were examined, and over 1,500 documentary pieces of evidence were presented to the court.

On 24 July 2015, the prime accused in the Godhra case, Hussain Suleman Mohammad, was arrested by the Godhra crime branch in Jhabua district, Madhya Pradesh. On 18 May 2016, a previously missing conspirator, Farooq Bhana, was arrested in Mumbai by the Gujarat Anti-Terrorist Squad. On 30 January 2018, Yakub Pataliya, aged 63, was arrested in Godhra by a team of B Division police after receiving a tip-off that he had been spotted in the town.

=== Prevention of Terrorism Act and trial ===
On 3 March 2002, The Prevention of Terrorism Ordinance (POTO) was invoked against all the accused, but it was later suspended due to pressure from the central government. On 9 March 2002, the police added criminal conspiracy charges. In May 2003, the first charge sheet was filed against 54 accused, though they were not charged under the Prevention of Terrorism Act (POTA). (Note: POTO became an act as it was cleared by Parliament.) In February 2003, POTA was re-invoked against all the accused after the BJP retained control of the Gujarat legislature in the 2002 assembly elections.

In November 2003, the Supreme Court of India stayed the trial. In 2004, the POTA was repealed after the United Progressive Alliance (UPA) came to power, prompting a review of its invocation against the accused. In May 2005, the POTA review commission decided not to charge the accused under POTA. This decision was later unsuccessfully challenged by a victim's relative in the Gujarat High Court and, subsequently, on appeal before the Supreme Court.

In September 2008, the Nanavati Commission submitted its report on the incident. In 2009, after accepting the Special Investigation Team (SIT) report, the court appointed a special fast-track court to try the case and established five other fast-track courts to try the post-incident riots. The bench hearing the case also mandated that public prosecutors be appointed in consultation with the SIT chair. It ordered the SIT to serve as the nodal agency for witness protection, file supplementary charge sheets, and potentially cancel the bail of the accused.

More than 100 people were arrested in connection with the incident. The court was set up inside the Sabarmati Central Jail, where almost all the accused were confined. The hearings began in May 2009, with Additional Sessions Judge P.R. Patel designated to hear the case.

In May 2010, the Supreme Court restrained trial courts from pronouncing judgments in nine sensitive riot cases, including the Godhra train incident. The trial was completed in September 2010, but the verdict could not be delivered due to the Supreme Court's stay. The stay was lifted in January 2011, and the judge announced that the judgment would be pronounced on 22 February 2011.

=== Court verdict ===
In February 2011, the trial court convicted 31 people and acquitted 63 others, concluding that the incident was a planned conspiracy. The convictions were based on the provisions for murder and conspiracy under Sections 302 and 120B of the Indian Penal Code, as well as Sections 149, 307, 323, 324, 325, 326, 332, 395, 397, and 436 of the IPC, along with relevant sections of the Railway Act and Police Act. The death penalty was awarded to 11 convicts, including those believed to have attended a meeting the night before the incident where the conspiracy was formed, and those who, according to the court, entered the coach and poured petrol before setting it on fire. Twenty others were sentenced to life imprisonment.

Maulvi Saeed Umarji, whom the SIT believed to be the prime conspirator, was acquitted along with 62 other accused due to a lack of evidence. The convicted individuals filed appeals in the Gujarat High Court. The state government also challenged the trial court's decision to acquit 61 individuals and sought death sentences for 20 convicts who had been sentenced to life imprisonment.

=== Gujarat High Court verdict ===
In October 2017, the Gujarat High Court, accepting the prosecution's contention that there was a conspiracy behind the incident, commuted the death sentences of 11 convicts to life imprisonment while upholding the life sentences of 20 others. As a result, all 31 individuals convicted by the SIT court in 2011 were sentenced to life imprisonment. Meanwhile, the 63 others who had been acquitted by the trial court in 2011, including the alleged mastermind, were re-acquitted by the High Court. The court also ordered the state government and the railways to pay ₹10 lakh (equivalent to ₹15 lakh or US$16,000 in 2026) in compensation to the families of each of the 59 victims.

=== Reactions to the SIT investigation ===
BJP spokesperson Shahnawaz Hussain stated, "The theory propagated by the (central) government and some NGOs (Non-Governmental Organization) has been proved wrong...." Law Minister Veerappa Moily, a Congress Party member, said it was premature to comment and that the courts would take their own course. R. K. Raghavan, head of the Special Investigation Team (SIT), expressed satisfaction with the verdict. BJP spokesperson Ravi Shankar Prasad added that the verdict had exposed the "nefarious designs" of the UPA government, which he accused of trying to cover up the entire episode.

== In popular culture ==
- Chand Bujh Gaya, a 2005 film, uses the Godhra train burning incident as the background for a love story.
- Kai Po Che!, a 2013 film, had the Gujarat riots as a backdrop for the main narrative. It was based on the novel The 3 Mistakes of My Life written by Chetan Bhagat.
- Final Solution, a 2004 documentary film, depicts the train burning and the Gujarat riots that followed.
- Accident or Conspiracy: Godhra, a 2024 film, based on a report set up to investigate the train burning incident.
- The Sabarmati Report, a 2024 film, starring Vikrant Massey follows him as a journalist probing the truth behind train burning incident.
- L2: Empuraan is a 2025 Malayalam movie which is loosely based on the 2002 riots. This movie revolves around Godhra train burning incident.

== See also ==
- Best Bakery case
- Naroda Patiya massacre
- Belkis Bano case

== Bibliography ==
- Brass, Paul R. (2005). The Production of Hindu-Muslim Violence in Contemporary India. University of Washington Press. ISBN 978-0-295-98506-0.
- Burke, Jason (22 February 2011). "Godhra train fire verdict prompts tight security measures". The Guardian. Archived from the original on 23 October 2013.
- Clark-Decès, Isabelle, ed. (2011). A Companion to the Anthropology of India. Wiley-Blackwell. ISBN 978-1405198929.
- Ghassem-Fachandi, Parvis (2012). Pogrom in Gujarat: Hindu Nationalism and Anti-Muslim Violence in India. Princeton University Press. ISBN 978-0691151779.
- Jaffrelot, Christophe (2003). "Communal Riots in Gujarat: The State at Risk?" (PDF). Heidelberg Papers in South Asian and Comparative Politics. Archived (PDF) from the original on 4 December 2013.
- Jaffrelot, Christophe (25 February 2012). "Gujarat 2002: What Justice for the Victims?". Economic & Political Weekly. XLVII (8): 77–80. JSTOR 41419907.
- Kishwar, Madhu Purnima (2014). Modi, Muslims and Media: Voices from Narendra Modi's Gujarat. Manushi Publications, New Delhi.
- Mitta, Manoj (2014), The Fiction of Fact-Finding: Modi & Godhra, HarperCollins Publishers India, ISBN 978-93-5029-187-0
- Nussbaum, Martha C. (2008). "The Clash Within: Democracy and the Hindu Right". In Ibrahim A. Karawan; Ibrāhīm Karawān; Wayne McCormack; Stephen E. Reynolds (eds.). Values and Violence: Intangible Aspects of Terrorism. Springer. pp. 81–97. ISBN 978-1402086595.
- Nussbaum, Martha C. (2007). The Clash Within: Democracy, Religious Violence and India's Future. Harvard University Press. ISBN 978-0-674-03059-6.
- Williams, Philippa (2011). "Hindu–Muslim Relations and the "War on Terror"". In Isabelle Clark-Decès (ed.). A Companion to the Anthropology of India. Wiley-Blackwell. ISBN 978-1405198929.
