= Ram Bharosey =

2024 film directed by Vishal Vada Vala

- Official Poster
- Directed by: Vishal Vada Vala
- Written by: Vishal Vada Vala; Kashyap Vyas
- Produced by: Maltiben Dave; Tejal Rawal; Ketan Rawal; Ajit Joshi; Manish Jain; Manish Patel Satani
- Starring: Dhairya Thakkar; Reeva Rachh; Nilesh Parmar
- Cinematography: Mihir Fichadiya
- Music by: Kedar and Bhargav
- Production companies: Mumbadevi Visions; MJ Films and Studios
- Distributed by: Rupam Entertainment Pvt Ltd
- Release date: 19 July 2024
- Running time: 125 minutes
- Country: India
- Language: Gujarati

Ram Bharosey is a 2024 Gujarati romantic drama, directed by Vishal Vada Vala and written by Vishal Vada vala and Kashyap Vyas. It stars Dhairya Thakkar, Reeva Rachh, Nilesh Parmar and others, The film is produced by Maltiben Dave, Tejal Rawal, Ketan Rawal, Ajit Joshi, Manish Jain & Manish Patel Satani. The film will be distributed by Rupam Entertainment Pvt Ltd.

== Plot ==
In a remote village in Gujarat, Keshav and Kesar's secret love story blossoms with handwritten letters and secret meetings, orchestrated by the help of Keshav's friend Parag. During one such meeting, Keshav and Kesar indulge in an intimate encounter. What will happen when Kesar misses her period?

== Cast ==
- Dhairya Thakkar
- Reeva Rachh
- Nilesh Parmar
- Jagjeetsinh Vadher
- Maulik Nayak
- Ekta Dangar
- Morli Patel
- Gaurang Anand
- Mayur Chauhan
- Manish Patel Satani
- Abhigna Mehta

== Production ==
The film was shot at various locations in Gujarat. The production design was carried out by Manan Kharsani, art by Mukkul Dhanaliya, and costumes by Dhaval Ahir & Hasti Doshi. Kruti Mahesh choreographed the song of the film, and music was created by Kedar and Bhargav. Singers like Aditya Gadhvi has given voice for title track, Umesh Barot has given the voice for Jhanjariyu Garba Song. O Saajana was sung by Aishwarya Majmudar and Jigardan Gadhavi.

== Soundtrack ==
Jhamkudi

Studio album by Kruz - Aghori Music, Shadaab Hashmi, & Bandish Project
- Released: 21 June 2024
- Genre: Feature film soundtrack
- Label: Mumbadevi Visions

=== Tracklist ===
All lyrics are written by Bhargav Purohit; all music is composed by Kedar and Bhargav.

No.	Title	Lyrics	Music	Singer(s)	Length
1.	"O Saajana"	Bhargav Purohit	Kedar & Bhargav	Aishwarya Majmudar & Jigardan Gadhavi	2:52
2.	"Jhanjariyu"	Bhargav Purohit	Kedar & Bhargav	Umesh Barot	3:35
3.	"Ram na Bharosey"	Bhargav Purohit	Kedar & Bhargav	Aditya Gadhvi	2:35
Total length:					08:22

== Releases ==
The film release date announced with the teaser of the film on 15 June 2024. The official trailer of the film released on 6 July 2024. The film hit the cinemas on 19 July 2024.

== See also ==
- List of Gujarati films of 2024
