= Chor No. 1 =

2026 Gujarati language comedy film

- Theatrical release poster
- Directed by: Rakesh Shah
- Written by: Rakesh Shah
- Produced by: Prashant Modi; Amit Vedawala; Pinki Vedawala
- Starring: Shrey Maradiya; Rishi Jani; Parth Modi; Aanchal Shah; Archan Trivedi; Ketan Thakkar
- Cinematography: Nasir Khan
- Edited by: Gul Mohammad Ansari
- Music by: Maulik Mehta
- Production companies: Eforu Entertainment; Ambi Gramy; Divine Production
- Distributed by: Rupam Entertainment
- Release date: 23 October 2026
- Running time: 121 minutes
- Country: India
- Language: Gujarati

Chor No. 1 is a 2026 Indian Gujarati Comedy drama film directed and written by Rakesh Shah. The film stars Shrey Maradiya, Rishi Jani, Parth Modi and Aanchal Shah in leading roles. It is produced by Prashant Modi, Amit Vedawala, Pinki Vedawala and Nilesh Modi under the banner of Eforu Entertainment, in association with Ambi Gramy and Divine Production. The film was released in theaters on 23 October 2026.

== Plot ==
The film is about three employees working in a company. Due to a mistake by the company manager, these three employees become victims of it. Three decides to do a theft and take revenge against their manager. This leads to comic laughter and delivers the social message.

== Cast ==
- Shrey Maradiya as Neel
- Rishi Jani as Nitin
- Parth Modi as Rakesh
- Aanchal Shah as Priyanka
- Archan Trivedi as Rameshbhai
- Ketan Thakkar as Ketan
- Manin Trivedi as Boss
- Ravi Solanki as Nandu
- Laukik Mandgel as Chandu
- Hetal Barot as Hetal
- Kavan Patel as Inspector Chauhan

== Soundtrack ==
Chor No. 1

Soundtrack album
- Released: 2026
- Genre: Feature film soundtrack
- Length: 6:57
- Language: Gujarati
- Label: Zee Music Company
External audio
- Chor No. 1 Full Album on JioSaavn

=== Track listing ===
All lyrics are written by Kiran Parihar; all music is composed by Maulik Mehta

Track listing
No.	Title	Lyrics	Music	Singer(s)	Length
1.	"Chor Na Bhai Chor"	Kiran Parihar	Maulik Mehta	Meet Mehta	3:40
2.	"Maru Gothvayi Gayu"	Kiran Parihar	Maulik Mehta	Umesh Barot	3:17
Total length:					6:57

== Production ==
The film was shot in Ahmedabad. Shooting started on 22 February 2026 and wrapped up on 11 March 2026.

== Marketing and release ==
The film's shooting started in Ahmedabad on 23 February 2026, when the film was officially announced. Its poster was released on 1 October 2026, followed by the trailer on 6 October 2026, which was released through YouTube and social media platforms. The film's first song, Chor Na Bhai Chor, was released on 16 October 2026, followed by the second song, Maru Gothvayi Gayu, on 17 October 2026. The film was theatrically released on 23 October 2026.

== Reception ==
Priykant Shrimali of VTV Gujarati praised Chor No. 1 for its blend of comedy and suspense, noting that its unexpected plot twists maintained the story's momentum. The review highlighted the film's comic dialogues, performances and treatment of themes such as money and greed, while describing the balance between humour and suspense as a key feature of the film.

== See also ==
- List of Gujarati films of 2026
- List of Gujarati films
