= Ruff and Tuff Kanya =

2026 film directed by Yash Vaishnav

- Official Poster
- Directed by: Yash Vaishnav
- Written by: Ujjval Dave; Yash Vaishnav; Killol Parmar; Kamal Joshi
- Produced by: Ananya Birla; Akshita Shah; Priti Shahani; Krishnadev Yagnik
- Starring: Hiten Kumar; Ravi Gohil; Yukti Randeria; Niilam Paanchal; Ragi Jani
- Cinematography: Haresh S Bhanushali; Prashant Gohel
- Edited by: Shivam Bhatt
- Music by: Andrew Samuel
- Production companies: Birla Studios; Big Box Series Private Limited
- Distributed by: Birla Studios
- Release date: 20 November 2026
- Running time: 128 Min
- Country: India
- Language: Gujarati

Ruff and Tuff Kanya is a 2026 Gujarati comedy drama, directed by Yash Vaishnav. Starring Hiten Kumar, Ravi Gohil, Yukti Randeria Niilam Paanchal, Ragi Jani and others . The film is produced by Ananya Birla under the banner of Birla Studios along with Krishnadev Yagnik from Big Box Series. The film was released in theaters on 20 November 2026.

== Plot ==
Shiv Pandit is an overprotective father who fears losing his daughter, Chhavi, after her marriage. Unable to accept the thought, he keeps inventing problems to delay her wedding. When Chhavi decides to marry someone of her own choice, a series of hilarious events unfolds.

== Cast ==
- Hiten Kumar as Shiv
- Ravi Gohil as Rajveer
- Yukti Randeria as Chhavi
- Niilam Paanchal as Sarvadamini
- Firoz Irani as Jatin
- Ragi Jani as Madhukar
- Sonali Lele Desai as Kavya
- Anuraag Prapanna as Vidhyut

== Production ==
The film was shot at various locations in Ahmedabad, Gujarat. The music and background score of the film has been given by Andrew Samuel

== Soundtrack ==
Andrew Samuel has given the Music for the film

Ruff and Tuff Kanya

Soundtrack album
- Released: 2026
- Genre: Feature film soundtrack
- Length: 4:39
- Language: Gujarati
- Label: Zee Music Company
External audio
- [https://www.youtube.com/playlist?list=PLEC1pLT4nBpc/ playlists on YouTube

=== Tracklist ===
All lyrics are written by Ujjval Dave; all music is composed by Andrew Samuel.

Track listing
No.	Title	Lyrics	Music	Singer(s)	Length
1.	"Ruff and Tuff Kanya Title Track"	Ujjval Dave	Andrew Samuel	Jigardan Gadhavi	04.39
Total length:					04.39

== Marketing and Releases ==
The release announcement of the film made on 11 October 2026 with the teaser of the film on social media. The trailer of the film released on 3 November 2026 on social media. The title track of the film has been released on 12 November 2026, which was sung by Jigardan Gadhavi.. The film was released in theaters on 20 November 2026.

== See also ==
- List of Gujarati films of 2026
