= The Sabarmati Report =

2024 Indian film by Dheeraj Sarna

- Theatrical release poster
- Directed by: Dheeraj Sarna; Ranjan Chandel (Replaced)
- Written by: Screenplay: Arjun Bhandegaonkar; Avinash Singh Tomar; Dialogues: Dheeraj Sarna
- Produced by: Ekta Kapoor; Shobha Kapoor; Amul V Mohan; Anshul Mohan
- Starring: Vikrant Massey; Raashii Khanna; Riddhi Dogra
- Cinematography: Amalendu Chaudhary
- Edited by: Manan Sagar
- Music by: Songs: Kartik Kush; Akhil Sachdeva; Anu Malik; Arko; Ramashrit Joshi; Aikarth Purohit
- Production companies: Balaji Motion Pictures; Vikir Films Production
- Distributed by: Zee Studios
- Release date: 15 November 2024
- Running time: 123 minutes
- Country: India
- Language: Hindi
- Budget: ₹50 crore
- Box office: est. ₹31.31 crore

The Sabarmati Report is a 2024 Indian Hindi-language film, written by Avinash and Arjun of a story by Aseem Arrora with direction by Ranjan Chandel, later replaced by Dheeraj Sarna. The film is jointly produced by Balaji Motion Pictures and Vikir Films Production, and distributed by Zee Studios. It is based on the Godhra train burning incident of 27 February 2002, involving Sabarmati Express train. It stars Vikrant Massey, Raashii Khanna and Riddhi Dogra.

After multiple issues and delays, The Sabarmati Report was released theatrically on 15 November 2024. It received mixed-to-negative reviews from critics and became a box-office bomb.

== Plot ==
Samar Kumar, an entertainment journalist for EBT News, is unexpectedly assigned to cover the aftermath of the Godhra train burning incident of 27 February 2002, alongside senior anchor Manika Rajpurohit. Initially treating the assignment with indifference, Samar becomes deeply affected after witnessing the tragic scene at the Godhra railway station, where 59 people, majorly Hindu pilgrims were burned alive aboard the Sabarmati Express.

In the film's plot, the journalist Samar Kumar investigates the Godhra train burning incident and uncovers material that contradicts the depiction of the fire as accidental. The film depicts his attempts to publish his findings being blocked by his news organization. The narrative follows his departure from the organization thereafter.

Later in the story, the character Amrita Gill seeks Samar's help in investigating the incident further. The film portrays their efforts to navigate institutional and public challenges as they continue their inquiry.

== Cast ==
- Vikrant Massey as Samar Kumar
- Raashii Khanna as Amrita Gill
- Riddhi Dogra as Manika Rajpurohit
- Barkha Singh as Shloka (cameo appearance)
- Naiyar Jafri as Raman Talwar, CEO EBT News
- Sundip Ved as Senior Minister
- Digvijay Purohit as Rajeev; EBT head
- Hella Stichlmair as Senior leader
- Nazneen Patni as Mehrunisa
- Abhishant Rana as Arun Badra
- Urvashi Golter as Sadia Banu
- Prapti Mehta as Sadia Banu's sister
- Neela Patel as Sadia Banu's mother
- Milind Pathak as EBT advocate
- Milind Joshi as Tis Hazari lawyer
- Aparna Menon as Samar's lawyer
- Diwakar Prasad Dhyani as Mishraji
- Badrul Islam as Saddam Supariwala
- Masood Akhtar as Maulvi Habib
- Sachin Arora as Lead Actor of Promotional Movie
- Ramashrit Joshi as Music Director

== Production ==
The project was announced in January 2024 by Shobha Kapoor and Ekta Kapoor, under the banner of Balaji Motion Pictures and Vikir Films Production, which is stated to be a based on a true event story and a crime-thriller film starring Vikrant Massey as lead actor, who was known for in his previous venture and a critically acclaimed film 12th Fail (2023), and the film is being directed by Ranjan Chandel. Raashii Khanna was announced as a female lead, it marks her second collaboration with Massey before her yet to release film Talaakhon Mein Ek, and it is her third Hindi film after Madras Cafe (2013) and Yodha (2024). Riddhi Dogra was announced for another lead role in the film. Then it was revealed by the makers that the film was based on Godhra train burning incident which was happened on 27 February 2002. The makers announced the cast and crew and story of the film by a video announcement with a release date. Later actress Barkha Singh joined for a secured role, later it was confirmed for a cameo appearance to star cast opposite as Vikrant's love interest. In April 2024, it was faced censor issues by the CBFC, and advised to reshot few scenes from the film. In July 2024, Ranjan Chandel (maker of the film) opt outed the film, due to the changes on the storyline, and said he doesn't need any credit with the film. Later in August 2024, Chandel was replaced by television writer and actor Dheeraj Sarna, with the changed storyline and plot.

Principal photography commenced in December 2023 and wrapped by mid-March.

== Music ==
The Sabarmati Report

Soundtrack album by Kartik Kush, Akhil Sachdeva, Anu Malik and Arko
- Released: 14 November 2024
- Recorded: 2023
- Genre: Feature film soundtrack
- Language: Hindi
- Label: Zee Music Company
- Producer: 29:30

Official audio
- The Sabarmati Report (Audio Jukebox) on YouTube

Track listing
No.	Title	Lyrics	Music	Singer(s)	Length
1.	"Raja Ram"	Kartik Kush	Kartik Kush	Kavita Krishnamurthy, Suresh Wadkar	3:37
2.	"Tere Mere Darmiyan"	Akhil Sachdeva	Akhil Sachdeva	Akhil Sachdeva	4:47
3.	"Sheher Sheher"	Kartik Kush	Kartik Kush	Kartik Kush, Arittra Nayak	4:42
4.	"Raja Ram" (Male Version)	Traditional, Ramashrit Joshi, Aikarth Purohit	Anu Malik	Raj Barman	6:24
5.	"Ik Baat Kahoon"	Arko	Arko	Arko	3:45
6.	"Raja Ram" (Female Version)	Traditional, Ramashrit Joshi, Aikarth Purohit	Anu Malik	Palak Muchhal	6:15
Total length:					29:30

== Release ==
=== Theatrical ===
This film was initially planned for theatrical release on 3 May 2024, then later pushed to 2 August 2024, due to the censor issues and Ranjan Chandel's (maker of the film) sudden quitting. After multiple issues and delays, The Sabarmati Report was theatrically released on 15 November 2024, The Central Board of Film Certification (CBFC) issued The Sabarmati Report a U/A certificate with few cuts as strong violence scenes, few muted words and alteration, resulting in a duration of 126.51 minutes. Prime Minister Narender Modi watched the film at the Parliament Library building in Delhi, along with several members of the Cabinet and members of Parliament.

=== Home media ===
The film was premiered on ZEE5 from 10 January 2025.

== Reception ==
The Sabarmati Report received mixed-to-negative reviews from critics, and mixed reviews from audiences. The film made Rs 1.69 crore at the box office on its opening day.

Shubhra Gupta, writing for The Indian Express, gave the film a rating of 1.5 stars out of 5 and added that it had "no nuance, just judgement". In another 1.5 star out of 5 rated review, Pankaj Shukla from Amar Ujala compared the film unfavorably to Accident or Conspiracy: Godhra, another 2024 film about the Godhra incident, and pointed out multiple inaccuracies in the usage of Hindi throughout the film while also labelling it an "attempt to cash in on Vikrant Massey's fame". Amit Bhatia from ABP News gave the film 3.5 stars out of 5, praising its bold approach to the subject matter, being unafraid to dive deep into the gritty realities of the incident and showcasing the media's role in uncovering the truth while also showing the media's shortcomings, thus presenting a layered view of how journalism intersects with politics and public opinion. Lachmi Deb Roy from Firstpost similarly gave the film 3.5 stars out of 5, calling it a well-researched story and a sharply made film which found out the root cause of the tragedy without unnecessary melodrama, stretching of incidents or even frivolous display of romance. Nishad Thaivalappil from CNN-News18, in another 3.5 star out of 5 rated review, praised the dialogue, background score and Massey's performance. Writing for India TV and labelling it "a must-watch for those who are interested in Indian history", Sakshi Verma gave the film 3 stars out of 5, finding the performances commendable and feeling it not only paid tribute to the innocent lives lost during the riots but also remained interesting till the end as a film. Similarly, Abhishek Srivastava from Times of India gave the film 3 stars out of 5 and praised the performances and the film's ability to hold viewer attention through most of its runtime, but felt its "slightly glossy treatment" made it feel less like a film based on true events and more like a typical commercial drama with cinematic embellishments that somewhat diluted its authenticity.

Zinia Bandyopadhyay from India Today gave the film 2 stars out of 5 and called it an honest attempt at looking at the Godhra tragedy and what happened to the Sabarmati Express on the fateful day, but felt it got marred with several issues being put into it - including the entire vernacular vs English journalists angle, which sometimes overshadowed the tragedy. Bollywood Hungama gave the film 1.5 stars out of 5, praising the lead performances, cinematography, background score and production design, while criticising its "haphazard execution" and loose ends in the script. Sukanya Verma gave the film 1 star out of 5, remarking it spent all its time pointing fingers at one side and entirely absolving another, as she compared it unfavorably to films such as Parzania and Firaaq, which she felt sensitively attempted to depict the trauma caused by the tragedy. On other hand, PM Narendra Modi who was state Chief Minister at the time, said "It is good that this truth is coming out, and that too in a way common people can see it. A fake narrative can persist only for a limited period of time. Eventually, the facts will always come out!"

== Controversy ==
On 8 November 2024, the trailer for the film was launched at an event in Mumbai. During the event, lead actor Vikrant Massey disclosed that he had received threats related to his involvement in the project, which addresses the Godhra train burning incident. Despite the threats, Vikrant affirmed the film's commitment to presenting factual content and stated that he, along with the team, would handle the situation as necessary.

== See also ==
- Accident or Conspiracy: Godhra, another 2024 Bollywood film about the Godhra train burning.
