= Duniyadari (2017 film) =

2017 Indian Gujarati drama film

- Official Poster
- Directed by: Shital Shah
- Written by: Ankit Joshipura; Shital Shah
- Screenplay by: Malhar Thakar
- Based on: Duniyadari book by Suhas Shirvalkar
- Produced by: Tajdar Amrohi; Riyaz Balooch
- Starring: Malhar Thakar; Esha Kansara; Aarjav Trivedi; Mamta Chaudhari; Tarika Tripathi; Shaunak Vyas; Parikshit Tamaliya; Rajar Thakar; Kishan Gadhvi
- Cinematography: Longinus Fernandes; Supriya Shah
- Edited by: Shaina Shah
- Music by: Monty Sharma
- Production companies: Kamal Amrohi Pictures; Worldwide Motion Pictures
- Distributed by: Raksha Entertainment
- Release date: 17 February 2017
- Running time: 121 Minutes
- Country: India
- Language: Gujarati

Duniyadari (transl. Worldliness) is a 2017 Gujarati drama film written and directed by Shital Shah, with co-writer Ankit Joshipura. It stars Malhar Thakar and Esha Kansara in the lead roles. The film is a remake of the 2013 Marathi hit film of the same title.

== Plot ==
Duniyadari is about a story of love, friendship, relationship and destiny during the mid-1970s. The story conveys the emotions of the youth and their romantic journeys, including what the destiny has in store for them.

== Cast ==
- Malhar Thakar as Meet Mehta
- Esha Kansara as Kavita Zaveri
- Aarjav Trivedi as Dharmesh Shankarbhai Patel
- Mamta Chaudhary as Amita Kala
- Tarika Tripathi as Shilpa Patel
- Shaunak Vyas as Dushyant Dhebar
- Parikshit Tamaliya as Krunal Zaveri
- Rajan Thakar as Manoj
- Kishan Gadhvi as Sorry
- Sanjay Galsar as paraag
- Hemang Shah as Jignesh

== Production ==
The film was produced under the banners of Kamal Amrohi Pictures and Worldwide Motion Pictures. In August 2016, an announcement was made that the Marathi hit film Duniyadari will be made in Gujarati.

=== Filming ===
Filming began in late September 2016 and wrapped up in January 2017. The entire film was shot in Ahmedabad.

== Soundtrack ==
Duniyadari

Soundtrack album by Monty Sharma
- Released: 30 December 2016
- Genre: Feature film soundtrack
- Length: 19:04
- Language: Gujarati
- Label: Kamal Amrohi Pictures

All lyrics are written by Niren Bhatt, and Ankit Joshipura; all music is composed by Monty Sharma.

Track listing
No.	Title	Singer(s)	Length
1.	"Jabbar Yaari Che"	Amarabha Banerjee, Aishwarya Majumdar, Amaan Noor	4:53
2.	"Taari Maari Yaari"	Shaan, Anamta kamal	4:08
3.	"Amaas Ni Raatadi Ma"	Amarabha Banerjee	5:41
4.	"Phoolon ne Rang Malya"	Parthiv Gohil, Aishwarya Majumdar	4:22
Total length:			19:04

== Marketing and release ==
The trailer of the film was released on 2 February 2017 and got 1 million views on YouTube in 5 days. The film was released on 17 February 2017.

== Reception ==
Abhimanyu Mishra of The Times of India rated it 3.5 stars out of 5. He praised the story, performances and direction.
