= National Film Award – Special Jury Award (feature film) =

Indian film award

- National award for contributions to Indian Cinema
- Sponsored by: Directorate of Film Festivals
- Formerly called: Special Commendation (1978)
- Rewards: Rajat Kamal (Silver Lotus); ₹2,00,000
- First award: 1978
- Final award: 2021
- Most recent winner: Shershaah

Highlights
- Total awarded: 50
- First winner: Acharya Kripalani

The National Film Award – Special Jury Award was one of the National Film Awards presented annually by the Directorate of Film Festivals, the organisation set up by Ministry of Information and Broadcasting, India. It was one of several awards presented for feature films. The recipients of Special Jury Award are awarded with Rajat Kamal (Silver Lotus), cash prize of ₹2,00,000 and certificate of merit.

The award was instituted in 1978, at 26th National Film Awards and awarded annually for films produced in the year across the country, in all Indian languages. This award considers all the aspects of film making than individual area. At the 70th National Film Awards, the award was discontinued.

== Winners ==
List of award recipients, showing the year (award ceremony), awarded as, film(s) and language(s)
Year	Recipient(s)	Awarded as	Film(s)	Language(s)	Refs.
1978 (26th)	No award				
1979 (27th)	–	Director	Acharya Kripalani	English	
1980 (28th)	No award				
1981 (29th)	Satyajit Ray	Director	Sadgati	Hindi	
1982 (30th)	No award				
1983 (31st)	Mankada Ravi Varma	Director	Nokkukuthi	Malayalam	
1984 (32nd)	T. S. Ranga	Director	Giddh	Hindi	
1985 (33rd)	Sudha Chandran	Actress	Mayuri	Telugu	
1986 (34th)	John Abraham	Director	Amma Ariyan	Malayalam	
1987 (35th)	M. B. Sreenivasan (posthumously)	Music director	–	–	
1988 (36th)	Ashok Ahuja	Director	Vasundhara	Hindi	
1989 (37th)	Amitabh Chakraborty	Director	Kaal Abhirati	Bengali	
1990 (38th)	Sunny Deol	Actor	Ghayal	Hindi	
1990 (38th)	Pankaj Kapur	Actor	Ek Doctor Ki Maut	Hindi	
1990 (38th)	Jayabharathi	Actress	Marupakkam	Tamil	
1991 (39th)	Soumitra Chatterjee	Actor	Antardhan	Bengali	
1992 (40th)	Sivaji Ganesan	Actor	Thevar Magan	Tamil	
1992 (40th)	Ketan Mehta	Director	Maya Memsaab	Hindi	
1993 (41st)	Shashi Kapoor	Actor	Muhafiz	Urdu	
1993 (41st)	Pallavi Joshi	Actress	Woh Chokri	Hindi	
1994 (42nd)	Radhu Karmakar (posthumously)	Cinematographer	Param Vir Chakra	Hindi	
1994 (42nd)	Shaji N. Karun	Director	Swaham	Malayalam	
1995 (43rd)	Shyam Benegal	Director	The Making of the Mahatma	English	
1996 (44th)	Amol Palekar	Director	Daayraa	Hindi	
1996 (44th)	Kiron Kher	Actress	Sardari Begum	Urdu	
1997 (45th)	Jaimala	Actress	Thaayi Saheba	Kannada	
1998 (46th)	• Drishyakavya • Ashoke Viswanathan	• Producer • Director	Kitchhu Sanlap Kitchhu Pralap	Bengali	
1999 (47th)	Kalabhavan Mani	Actor	Vasanthiyum Lakshmiyum Pinne Njaanum	Malayalam	
2000 (48th)	Soumitra Chatterjee	Actor	Dekha	Bengali	
2001 (49th)	Janaki Vishwanathan	Director	Kutty	Tamil	
2002 (50th)	Prakash Raj	Actor	Dhaya	Tamil	
2003 (51st)	Manoj Bajpai	Actor	Pinjar	Hindi	
2003 (51st)	• Roopkatha • Goutam Halder	• Producer • Director	Bhalo Theko	Bengali	
2004 (52nd)	J. Phillip	Actor	Dancer	Tamil	
2005 (53rd)	Anupam Kher	Actor	Maine Gandhi Ko Nahin Mara	Hindi	
2006 (54th)	Vishal Bhardwaj	Director	Omkara	Hindi	
2007 (55th)	• Anil Kapoor • Feroz Abbas Khan	• Producer • Director	Gandhi, My Father	• Hindi • English	
2008 (56th)	• NFDC • K. M. Madhusudhanan	• Producer • Director	Bioscope	Malayalam	
2009 (57th)	A. Sreekar Prasad	Editor	• Kaminey • Keralavarma Pazhassiraja • Kutty Srank	• Hindi • Malayalam • Malayalam	
2010 (58th)	• Bindiya Khanolkar • Sachin Khanolkar • Anant Mahadevan	• Producer • Producer • Director	Mee Sindhutai Sapkal	Marathi	
2011 (59th)	Anjan Dutt	• Actor • Director • Singer • Writer	Ranjana Ami Ar Ashbona	Bengali	
2012 (60th)	Rituparno Ghosh	• Actor • Director • Writer	Chitrangada	Bengali	
2012 (60th)	Nawazuddin Siddiqui	Actor	• Dekh Indian Circus • Gangs of Wasseypur • Kahaani • Talaash	Hindi	
2013 (61st)	• Viva in En • Mahesh Limaye	• Producer • Director	Yellow	Marathi	
2013 (61st)	• Future East Film Pvt Ltd • Ashim Ahluwalia	• Producer • Director	Miss Lovely	Hindi	
2014 (62nd)	Bhaurao Karhade	Director	Khwada	Marathi	
2015 (63rd)	Kalki Koechlin	Actress	Margarita with a Straw	Hindi	
2016 (64th)	Mohanlal	Actor	• Janatha Garage • Munthirivallikal Thalirkkumbol • Pulimurugan	• Telugu • Malayalam • Malayalam	
2017 (65th)	• Sani Ghose Ray • Kaushik Ganguly	• Producer • Director	Nagarkirtan	Bengali	
2018 (66th)	• Shraddha Dangar • Shachi Joshi • Denisha Ghumra • Niilam Paanchal • Tarjani Bhadla • Brinda Nayak • Tejal Panchasara • Kaushambi Bhatt • Ekta Bachwani • Kamini Panchal • Jagruti Thakore • Riddhi Yadav • Prapti Mehta	Actresses	Hellaro	Gujarati	
2018 (66th)	Indradip Dasgupta	Director	Kedara	Bengali	
2019 (67th)	R. Parthiban	• Actor • Director • Producer • Writer	Oththa Seruppu Size 7	Tamil	
2020 (68th)	Ojaswee Sharma	Director	Admitted	• Hindi • English	
2021 (69th)	• Vishnuvardhan • Karan Johar • Dharma Productions	• Director • Producer	Shershaah	Hindi	

== See also ==
- National Film Award – Special Mention
