= Kadaknath (film) =

2026 Indian Gujarati Thriller film

- Official Poster
- Directed by: Kaushik Garasiya
- Written by: Kaushik Garasiya
- Produced by: Vihang Rathod; Nirav Bhabhor
- Starring: Abhinay Banker; Denisha Ghumra; Nirav Bhabhor; Nisarg Trivedi; Chetan Daiya; Chetankumar Solanki
- Cinematography: Harshit Saini
- Edited by: Vihang Rathod
- Music by: Kedar Upadhyay; Bhargav Purohit
- Production company: LensQueen Films
- Distributed by: Rupam Entertainment Pvt Ltd
- Release date: 26 June 2026
- Country: India
- Language: Gujarati

Kadaknath (Gujarati: કડકનાથ) is a 2026 Indian Gujarati crime thriller film directed and written by Kaushik Garasiya. Produced by Vihang Rathod and Nirav Bhabhor under the banner of LensQueen Films, the film stars Abhinay Banker, Denisha Ghumra, Nirav Bhabhor, Nisarg Trivedi, Chetan Daiya, Chetankumar Solanki and others. The film is set in the tribal region of Gujarat and incorporates the Bhili dialect. It is scheduled to be released theatrically on 26 June 2026.

== Plot ==
After a series of grisly killings terrify a quaint village, a noble poultry farmer embarks on an investigative quest, grappling with mystical hallucinations and an unreliable police officer.

== Cast ==
- Abhinay Banker as Abhaysinh Damor
- Denisha Ghumra as Sharda Damor
- Nirav Bhabhor as Nirav Damor
- Nisarg Trivedi as Nathubhai Bhabhor
- Chetan Daiya as Inspector Pratap Parmar
- Suryanshi Shah as Dr.Nidhi
- Het Panchal as Mathur Baria
- Rahul Amaliyar as Villager
- Chandrasinh Bhabhor as Bride’s Father
- Kinjal Bhabhor as Matthu’s Bride
- Lalitaben C Bhabhor as Senior Doctor
- Pratiksha Chaudhari as Nurse
- Pankaj Chauhan as Dinu
- Amit Damor as Matthu's Father
- Mahesh Damor as Paresh
- Vijay Ganava as Rafiq Bhai
- Kiranbhai Garasiya as Matthu’s Uncle
- Maltiben Garasiya as Matthu’s Aunt
- Chetankumar Solanki as Amarsinh
- Abdulwaseem Qureshi as Dipu

== Soundtrack ==
Kadaknath

Soundtrack album
- Released: 2026
- Genre: Feature film soundtrack
- Length: 7:32
- Language: Gujarati
- Label: LensQueen Films
External audio
- Kadaknath Full Album on JioSaavn

=== Tracklist ===
All lyrics are written by Bhargav Purohit; all music is composed by Kedar Upadhyay, Bhargav Purohit.

Track listing
No.	Title	Lyrics	Music	Singer(s)	Length
1.	"Painu Painu"	Bhargav Purohit	Kedar Upadhyay, Bhargav Purohit	Kedar Upadhyay, Bhargav Purohit, Kaushik Garasiya, Vihang Rathod, Nirav Bhabhor	03:12
2.	"Damor Damor"	Bhargav Purohit	Kedar Upadhyay, Bhargav Purohit	Bhargav Purohit	02:09
3.	"Kai Maanu Ni"	Bhargav Purohit	Kedar Upadhyay, Bhargav Purohit	Nisarg Trivedi	02:11
Total length:					07:32

== Production ==
=== Development ===
The film was written and directed by Kaushik Garasiya. According to Garasiya, the story was inspired by the lived experiences of the Adivasi community and was conceived as a thriller to explore themes of trauma, discrimination and social marginalisation.

=== Filming ===
The film was shot across fifteen villages in Dahod district, Gujarat.

=== Language and themes ===
Kadaknath is noted for its use of the Bhili dialect and its portrayal of Adivasi life in eastern Gujarat. Garasiya stated that retaining the dialect was essential to the authenticity of the story and its cultural setting.

== Release ==
The film was screened at the 24th Pune International Film Festival (PIFF) in January 2026. It was also showcased at the Habitat Film Festival in May 2026.

The motion poster of the film was released on 3 April 2026, followed by the official teaser on 20 May 2026. The trailer was released on 15 June 2026 through YouTube and other social media platforms. The film is scheduled for theatrical release on 26 June 2026.

== Reception ==
=== Critical reception ===
Kadaknath received a positive review from VTV Gujarati, which praised the film's portrayal of the tribal culture of Dahod district, use of the Bhili dialect, performances of the lead cast, cinematography and background score. The review noted that while the film's suspenseful narrative and cultural authenticity were its strengths, the second half slowed in pace and the climax could have featured a stronger twist.

== See also ==
- List of Gujarati films of 2026
- List of Gujarati films
