= Accident or Conspiracy: Godhra =

2024 Indian thriller drama film

- Theatrical release poster
- Directed by: M.K. Shivaaksh
- Written by: M.K. Shivaaksh
- Based on: 2002 Gujarat riots
- Produced by: B.J. Purohit
- Starring: Ranvir Shorey; Manoj Joshi; Hitu Kanodia; Denisha Ghumra; Akshita Namdev; MK Shivaaksh
- Cinematography: Shankar Awwate
- Edited by: Santosh Mandal; Vikas Yadav
- Music by: Score: Mannan Munjal; Songs: V.Rakx (Rakesh Verma); Yug Bhusal
- Production companies: Om Trinetra Films; Artverse Studios
- Release date: 19 July 2024
- Running time: 133 minutes
- Country: India
- Language: Hindi

Accident or Conspiracy: Godhra is a 2024 Indian Hindi-language film produced under the banner of OM Trinetra Films and Artverse Studios directed by M.K Shivaaksh. The film is based on the events surrounding the 2002 Godhra train fire in Gujarat, India, which later led to the 2002 Gujarat riots. The film received poor reviews.

== Synopsis ==
The film is based on the report issued by the Nanavati-Mehta Commission, which was set up to investigate the Godhra train fire. The film aims to uncover what happened in Godhra.

== Cast ==
- Ranvir Shorey as Mahmood Qureshi
- Manoj Joshi as Ravindra Pandya
- Hitu Kanodia as Deshpandey
- Denisha Ghumra as Devki
- Akshita Namdev as Turshi
- MK Shivaaksh as Abhimanyu
- Ganesh Yadav as Hamid Bilal
- Makrand Shukla as Rajdeep Singh Baghela
- Rajeev Surti as Shri Raam Ji
- Gulshan Pandey as Ravi Mohan
- Bhaskar Manyam as Mansukh Bhai
- Avyan Alpesh Mehta as Mannu
- Pankaj Anand as Molvi Saab
- Darshana Bhavsar as Train passenger

== Music ==
The very first song of the film was recorded in the soulful voice of Kailash Kher

No.	Title	Music	Singer(s)	Length
1.	"Ho Mangalam"	V.Rakx	Kailash kher	3:35
2.	"Siiya Raam"	V.Rakx	Divya Kumar (singer), Vaishali Made	3:44
3.	"Aaj Tara Tara"	Yug Bhusal, Roop Mohanta	Papon	3:33

== Reception ==
The Times of India gave it a rating of 2/5 and called it "one-sided". Amar Ujala gave it a rating of 2/5 and criticised the movie for its limited scope.

== See also ==
- The Sabarmati Report, another 2024 Bollywood film about the Godhra train burning.
