= Frendo (film) =

2024 film directed by Vipul Sharma

- Official Poster
- Directed by: Vipul Sharma
- Written by: Vipul Sharma
- Produced by: Dr. Bansari Patel; Raju Radia; Dr. Jayesh Patel; Nikhil Raikundalia; Dr. Pooja Jainish Vashi
- Starring: Tushar Sadhu; Twinkal Patel; Jay Pandya; Kushal Mistry; Deep Vaidya; Om Bhatt
- Cinematography: Sree Kumar Nair
- Edited by: Roopang Acharya
- Music by: Rahul Prajapati
- Production company: Veer Bansari Films
- Distributed by: Rupam Entertainment Pvt Ltd
- Release date: 13 September 2024
- Running time: 146.00 minutes
- Country: India
- Language: Gujarati

Frendo is a 2024 Gujarati comedy drama, directed and written by Vipul Sharma. It stars Tushar Sadhu, Twinkal Patel, Jay Pandya, Kushal Mistry, Deep Vaidya, Om Bhatt in leading role. The film is produced by Dr Bansari Patel, Raju Radia along with co produced by Dr. Jayesh Patel, Nikhil Raikundalia and Dr. Pooja Jainish Vashi, under the banner of Veer Bansari Films. The film will be distributed by Rupam Entertainment Pvt Ltd.

== Plot ==
Four buddies who are proudly and voluntarily jobless embark on an exhilarating voyage. They will wait for the wind to come and blow the fly off if it is sitting on their mouth. These four are having a good life together, but Kana has to make a decision since he falls in love with Radhika right away and wants to marry her; things they are unable to do.

== Cast ==
- Tushar Sadhu as Kaano
- Twinkal Patel as Radhika
- Jay Pandya as Bako
- Kushal Mistry as Jigo
- Deep Vaidya as Laalo
- Ragi Jani as Utpal
- Jaimini Trivedi as Kusum
- Prashant Barot as Vaasu
- Om Bhatt as Baablo Chokobar
- Shivani Pandey as Champakali

== Production ==
The film was shot at various locations in Idar and Ahmedabad Gujarat. The production design was carried out by Jay Shihora and art direction was by Mit Soni. Casting director was Sahil Patel, who selected the actors based on the requirement of script. Line production by Dhaval Parmar. Costuming was by Tanvi Seth. The music of the film was given by Rahul Prajapati. Lyrics given by Vihul Jagirdar. Nakash Aziz, Drashti Shah, Rahul Prajapati and Bhumik Shah were vocalists for the two songs in the film.

== Soundtrack ==
Frendo

Soundtrack album by Rahul Prajapati
- Released: 2024
- Genre: Feature film soundtrack
- Length: 5:46
- Language: Gujarati
- Label: Veer Bansari Films

All lyrics are written by Vihul Jagirdar; all music is composed by Rahul Prajapati.

Track listing
No.	Title	Singer(s)	Length
1.	"Love Ni Flight"	Nakash Aziz, Drashti Shah & Rahul Prajapati	3:20
2.	"Vagado Dhol"	Bhumik Shah	2:26
Total length:			5:46

== Marketing and releases ==
The film release date announced on July 2, 2024. The official poster released on August 4, 2024. The second poster of the film released on August 17, 2024. The trailer of the film is released on August 20, 2024. The film is set to hit the cinemas on September 13, 2024.

== See also ==
- List of Gujarati films of 2024
