= King of Salangpur =

- Official Poster
- Directed by: Prashant Deshaval
- Written by: Sanjay Prajapati
- Produced by: Dhruv Deshaval; Amit Santoki; Chetan Thummar; Anand Aghara; Hardik Gadara
- Starring: Sagar Panchal; Akash Pandya; Mayur Soneji
- Cinematography: Mihir Fichadiya
- Edited by: Shivam Bhatt
- Music by: Prashant Satose
- Production companies: Zee Studios; Vamika Productions
- Distributed by: Zee Studios
- Release date: 27 November 2026
- Country: India
- Language: Gujarati

King of Salangpur is an 2026 Indian Gujarati language devotional drama film directed by Prashant Deshaval. Presented by Zee Studios and Vamika Films, the film centres on the religious traditions and history associated with Kashtbhanjan Dev Hanuman at Salangpur, Gujarat.

The film stars Sagar Panchal, Akash Pandya, Mayur Soneji, Saloni Rawal, Bhushan Bhatt and Bhavin Dilipbhai Mehta in leading roles. It is produced by Dhruv Deshaval, Amit Santoki, Chetan Thummar, Anand Aghara, and Hardik Gadara.It is scheduled for theatrical release on 27 November 2026.

== Plot ==
The film explores the religious history and traditions associated with Kashtbhanjan Dev Hanuman at Sarangpur, Gujarat. Its narrative draws on the establishment of the shrine and the role of Gopalanand Swami, alongside themes of faith and devotion.

== Cast ==
- Sagar Panchal
- Akash Pandya
- Mayur Soneji
- Saloni Rawal (Radio Jockey)
- Bhushan Bhatt
- Bhavin Dilipbhai Mehta
- Harikrishna Dave
- Bharat Thakker
- Hetal Barot
- Kalpesh Patel

== Soundtrack ==
King of Salangpur

Soundtrack album
- Released: 2026
- Genre: Feature film soundtrack
- Length: 7:59
- Language: Gujarati
- Label: Vamika Productions Pvt Ltd
External audio
- King of Salangpur Full Album on JioSaavn

=== Track listing ===
All lyrics are written by Niraj Ker; all music is composed by Prashant Satose

Track listing
No.	Title	Lyrics	Music	Singer(s)	Length
1.	"Jai Hanuman"	Niraj Ker	Prashant Satose	B Praak	3:54
2.	"Hari Bol"	Niraj Ker	Prashant Satose	Aditya Gadhvi	4:05
Total length:					7:59

== Production ==
The film was announced in December 2025 by Rajkot-based Vamika Productions. The film focuses on the history and religious traditions of the Salangpur Hanuman temple, including its establishment and stories associated with Kashtbhanjan Dev Hanuman. Hariprakash Swami unveiled the first poster.

== Marketing and Release ==
The film's first-look poster was released on social media platforms on 7 September 2026. The teaser was released on 24 October 2026, followed by the trailer on 17 November 2026, both on YouTube and other social media platforms. The film is scheduled for theatrical release on 27 November 2026.

== See also ==
- List of Gujarati films of 2026
- List of Gujarati films
- Hanuman temple, Salangpur
- Gopalanand Swami
