= Vaar Tahevaar =

2024 film directed by Cchinmay P Purohit

- Official Poster
- Directed by: Cchinmay P Purohit
- Written by: Cchinmay P Purohit
- Produced by: Manish Desai
- Starring: Monal Gajjar; Parikshit Tamaliya; Tiku Talsania
- Cinematography: Shakil B. Khan
- Production companies: Mangalya Media & Entertainment LLP; Goosebumps Studios
- Distributed by: Rupam Entertainment Pvt Ltd
- Release date: 2 August 2024
- Running time: 128 minutes
- Country: India
- Language: Gujarati

Vaar Tahevaar is a 2024 Gujarati romantic drama, directed and written by Cchinmay P Purohit. It stars Monal Gajjar, Parikshit Tamaliya, Tiku Talsania, and others. The film is produced by Manish Desai and Associate Producer is Rita Desai. The film will be distributed by Rupam Entertainment Pvt Ltd.

== Plot ==
Preetal and Shubh represent today's generation mindset. They are not very keen on starting their own families; they are focused on earning money and achieving their goals, but getting married is not a priority for them. But their families, determined to change Preetal and Shubh's mindsets, convince them to attend the grand Holi festival and the wedding of Shiv and Shivani, who are madly in love with each other (presenting the madness of love) and embody the joy and fulfillment of traditional family values.

== Cast ==
- Monal Gajjar
- Parikshit Tamaliya
- Tiku Talsania
- Kalpana Gagdekar
- Anurag Prapanna
- Anchal Shah
- Manisha Purohit
- Kalpesh Patel
- Bhumika Patel
- Pralay Rawal
- Manisha Trivedi
- Pranav Unadkat
- Arvind Vaidya

== Production ==
The film was shot at various locations in Ahmedabad Gujarat. Vinay Kapadia has given the music in the film. The line production has been carried out by Dhaval Pandya. The film has been edited by Jitendra Shah.

== Soundtrack ==
Vaar Tahevaar

Studio album by Vinay Kapadia
- Released: 12 July 2024
- Genre: Feature film soundtrack
- Label: Maangalya Media and Entertainment LLP

=== Tracklist ===
All lyrics are written by Vinay Kapadia; all music is composed by Vinay Kapadia.

No.	Title	Lyrics	Music	Singer(s)	Length
1.	"Ek Mathi Be"	Vinay Kapadia	Vinay Kapadia	Vastvik Roy & Smita Adhikary	3:33
2.	"Emotional Banvu Hanikarak"	Cchinmay P Purohit	Vinay Kapadia	Shaan (singer) & Smita Adhikary	3:17
Total length:					06:50

== Releases ==
The film release date announced by video from actors on 19 June 2024. The official teaser of the film released on 2 July and poster is released on 9 July 2024. The film is set to hit the cinemas on 2 August 2024.

== See also ==
- List of Gujarati films of 2024
