= Vaanki Chuki Love Story =

2026 film directed by Dhwani Gautam

- Official Poster
- Directed by: Dhwani Gautam
- Written by: Prem Gadhavi; Nikita Shah; Aditi Varma
- Produced by: Nitin Bhanushali; Vaishali Nitin Bhanushali; Purvik Bhanushali (Co Producer); Krisha Bhanushali (Co Producer); Karan Bhanushali (Co Producer)
- Starring: Puja Joshi; Parikshit Tamaliya; Bhavin Bhanushali; Miloni Jhonsa; Dharmesh Vyas
- Cinematography: Suraj C Kurade
- Edited by: Harkirat Singh Lal
- Music by: Rahul Munjariya; Aghori Muzik; Bhavin Bhanushali; Gaurang Pala; Dharmdev Maniar
- Production companies: Nitishali Productions; Dhwani Gautam Films
- Distributed by: Panorama Studios
- Release date: 8 May 2026
- Running time: 153 minutes
- Country: India
- Language: Gujarati

Vaanki Chuki Love Story (Gujarati: વાંકી ચૂકી લવ સ્ટોરી) is a 2026 Indian Gujarati romantic comedy, family drama and suspense film directed by Dhwani Gautam and written by Prem Gadhavi, Nikita Shah and Aditi Varma. The film stars Puja Joshi, Parikshit Tamaliya, Bhavin Bhanushali, Miloni Jhonsa, Dharmesh Vyas and others. It is produced by Nitin Bhanushali under the banner of Nitishali Productions, in association with Dhwani Gautam Films. The film was released in theatres on 8 May 2026.

== Plot ==
Dev agrees to marry Tithi after a painful breakup with Mayra, but their carefully planned destination wedding in Kutch takes an unexpected turn when Mayra returns as the wedding planner. As festivities unfold and hidden tensions rise, Dev is forced to confront unresolved feelings and choose between his past and his future.

== Cast ==
- Puja Joshi as Tithi
- Parikshit Tamaliya as Dev
- Bhavin Bhanushali as Yug
- Miloni Jhonsa as Mayra
- Dharmesh Vyas
- Surbhi Javeri Vyas
- Hemang Dave
- Chetan Daiya
- Shekhar Shukla
- Akash Pandya
- Hemin Trivedi
- Harita Shah
- Satvi Choksi
- Rupa Mehta
- Hetal Parmar
- Mahiman Pandya

== Soundtrack ==
Vaanki Chuki Love Story

Soundtrack album
- Released: 2026
- Genre: Feature film soundtrack
- Length: 21:06
- Language: Gujarati
- Label: Nitishali Productions
External audio
- Vaanki Chuki Love Story Full Album on JioSaavn

=== Tracklist ===
All lyrics are written by Aghori Muzik, Bhavin Bhanushali, Nandan Purohit, Bharat Rami, Bhargav Purohit; all music is composed by Kruz, Bhavin Bhanushali, Gaurang Pala, Rahul Munjariya

Track listing
No.	Title	Lyrics	Music	Singer(s)	Length
1.	"Fagan Foram"	Aghori Muzik	Kruz (Aghori Muzik)	Kruz, Hard-D, K. Deep, Megh Mehta, Bansari Maisuriya	03:59
2.	"Prem Thayo"	Bhavin Bhanushali	Bhavin Bhanushali, Gaurang Pala	Bhavin Bhanushali	03:58
3.	"Kaali Kaali"	Nandan Purohit	Rahul Munjariya	Aamir Mir, Vandana Gadhavi	04:10
4.	"Rove Dil"	Bharat Rami	Rahul Munjariya	Vandana Gadhavi	05:17
5.	"Kaajal Kali"	Bhargav Purohit	Rahul Munjariya	Jigardan Gadhavi	04:22
Total length:					21:06

== Production ==
=== Casting ===
The film features Puja Joshi, Bhavin Bhanushali, Parikshit Tamaliya, Miloni Jhonsa, and Dharmesh Vyas in lead roles.

Bhavin Bhanushali has previously appeared in Gujarati films such as Jalso – A Family Invitation and Vahali. Jalso - A Family Invitation also featured Puja Joshi and Dharmesh Vyas. Parikshit Tamaliya has appeared in films including Auntypreneur, Pappa No Insurance, and Aavaa De.

=== Filming ===
The film's shooting began on 26 June 2025 in Bhuj. The film was shot at various locations in the Kutch district and other parts of Gujarat.

== Marketing and release ==
The first song from the film, "Fagan Foram", was released on 1 March 2026 on YouTube and other social media platforms. The teaser was subsequently released on 16 March 2026. The film was released in theatres across India on 8 May 2026, with distribution by Panorama Studios.

== See also ==
- List of Gujarati films of 2026
- List of Gujarati films
