= Denisha Ghumra =

Indian actress (born 1995)

- Born: 13 November 1995 (age 30); Jamnagar, Gujarat, India
- Occupation: Actress
- Years active: 2019–present

Denisha Ghumra (born 13 November 1995) is an Indian actress from Gujarat, India. She is known for her role in Gujarati films Hellaro (2019), Saatam Aatham (2022) and Raktbeej (2022).

== Biography ==
Denisha was born on 13 November 1995 in Jamnagar, Gujarat. She received her school education from St Ann's High School in Jamnagar, and college education from KS School of Business Management and Upasna School of Performing Arts.

She debuted in 2019 Gujarati period drama film Hellaro, which won the National Film Award for Best Feature Film at the 66th National Film Awards and she earned Special Jury Award for her performance. The film has been theatrically released in India on 8 November 2019 to positive reviews and her acting is appreciated by the audiences. She later acted in Hardik Parikh's Raktbeej, and in Shital Shah's Saatam Aatham. Her film Bharat Maro Desh Che directed by Bhavin Trivedi has been selected in International Gujarati Film Festival.

== Awards and accolades ==
Year	Award	Category	Nominated work	Result	Ref.
2019	National Film Awards	Special Jury Award	Hellaro	Won	

== Filmography ==
Year	Film	Role
2019	Hellaro	Radha
2019	Neverland	Aditi
2021	Baadal Jal Baras Rahat	Young Swara
2022	Saatam Aatham	Vishakha
2022	Raktbeej	Aadhya Shodhan
2022	Raado	
2022	Bharat Maro Desh Chhe	Devki
2023	Kutch Express	Kanchan
2023	Accident or Conspiracy: Godhra	Kanchan
2024	Nasoor	Chhabbi
2026	Behrupiyo	
2026	Kadaknath	Sharda Damor
