= Vaibhavi Upadhyay =

Indian television actress (1984–2023)

- Born: Vaibhavi Upadhyay; 25 July 1984; Gujarat, India
- Died: 22 May 2023 (aged 38); Kullu, Himachal Pradesh, India
- Occupation: Actress
- Years active: 2006–2023
- Known for: Sarabhai vs Sarabhai

Vaibhavi Upadhyay (25 July 1984 – 22 May 2023) was an Indian actress. She was nominated for an ITA Award for Best Actor (Female) Popular. She rose to fame in the role of Jasmine Mavani in the 2017 sitcom Sarabhai vs Sarabhai.

== Death and legacy ==
Upadhyay died in a car crash on 22 May 2023. She was riding with her fiancé when the car fell into a gorge in the Banjar neighbourhood of Kullu district, Himachal Pradesh. She was aged 38 when she died. Her family, co-stars and fans mourned her death. Her funeral was held in Borivali, Mumbai, Maharashtra, India.

== Filmography ==
Year	Film	Role
2014	CityLights	Mahi Singh
2020	Chhapaak	Meenakshi
2023	Timir	Ritika
2024	Locha Laapsi	Meshruta

== Television ==
Year	Serial	Role	Channel
2006	Left Right Left	Neelu Sahni	Sony SAB
2013	CID – Maut Ka Nasha	Shilpa (Episode 983)	Sony Entertainment Television
2014	Ishq Kills	Episode 10	Star Plus
2014	Adaalat – Client In Coma: Part 1 & Part 2	Advocate Rubina Khan (Episode 340 & Episode 341)	Sony Entertainment Television
2014	Adaalat – Diwali Special	Advocate Rubina Khan (Episode 369)	Sony Entertainment Television
2015	SuperCops Vs SuperVillains	Dr.Sania (Season 5 - Episode 27)	Life Ok
2015	MTV Big F – The Unforgettable Coincidence	Maya (Season 1 – Episode 8)	MTV
2016	Dahleez	Padma Shree (Paddy)Journalist	Star Plus
2016	CID – Chehre Pe Chehra	Maitri (Episode 1398)	Sony Entertainment Television
2017	Kya Qusoor Hai Amala Ka?	Esha	Star Plus
2017	Sarabhai vs Sarabhai	Jasmine Mavani	Disney+ Hotstar

== Travel Show ==
Year	Show	Role	Channel
2014	Sanrachna	Host	Epic TV

== Web series ==
Year	Show	Role	Channel
2018	Zeo KMS	Sheela	ZEE5
2020–2022	Please Find Attached	Ratna Ghosh	Amazon Prime Video

== Short films ==
Year	Show	Role	Channel
2019	Delivery Girl	Wife	YouTube
