= Parikshit Tamaliya =

Indian theater and film actor (born 1996)

- Born: 23 June 1996 (age 29); Surendranagar, Gujarat, India
- Occupation: Actor
- Years active: 2017–present

Parikshit Tamaliya (born 23 June 1996) is an Indian theater and film actor from Gujarat, India. He is one of the rising Gujarati film actors. He is known for his role in Gujarati films Duniyadari (2017 film) (2017). He later starred in films like Saheb (film) (2019), Prem Prakran (2022) and Saatam Aatham (2022).

== Career ==
Parikshit debuted in Gujarati cinema in 2017 with Duniyadari (2017 film) directed by Shital Shah. Later he acted in Saheb (film) (2019), Prem Prakran (2022).

In 2022, He appeared as lead actor in Saatam Aatham directed by Shital Shah which received a lot of attention from netizens.

== Filmography ==
| Year | Film | Role |
|---|---|---|
| 2017 | Duniyadari | Krunal Zaveri |
| 2019 | Saheb | Chintu |
| 2022 | Saatam Aatham | Munna |
| 2022 | Prem Prakran | |
| 2023 | Hu ane Tu | Tejas |
| 2024 | Vaar Tahevaar | Shubh |
| 2025 | Auntypreneur | |
| 2026 | Parijaat | |
| 2026 | Vaanki Chuki Love Story | Dev |
