= Tushar Shukla =

Indian poet and author (born 1955)

Tushar Durgeshbhai Shukla
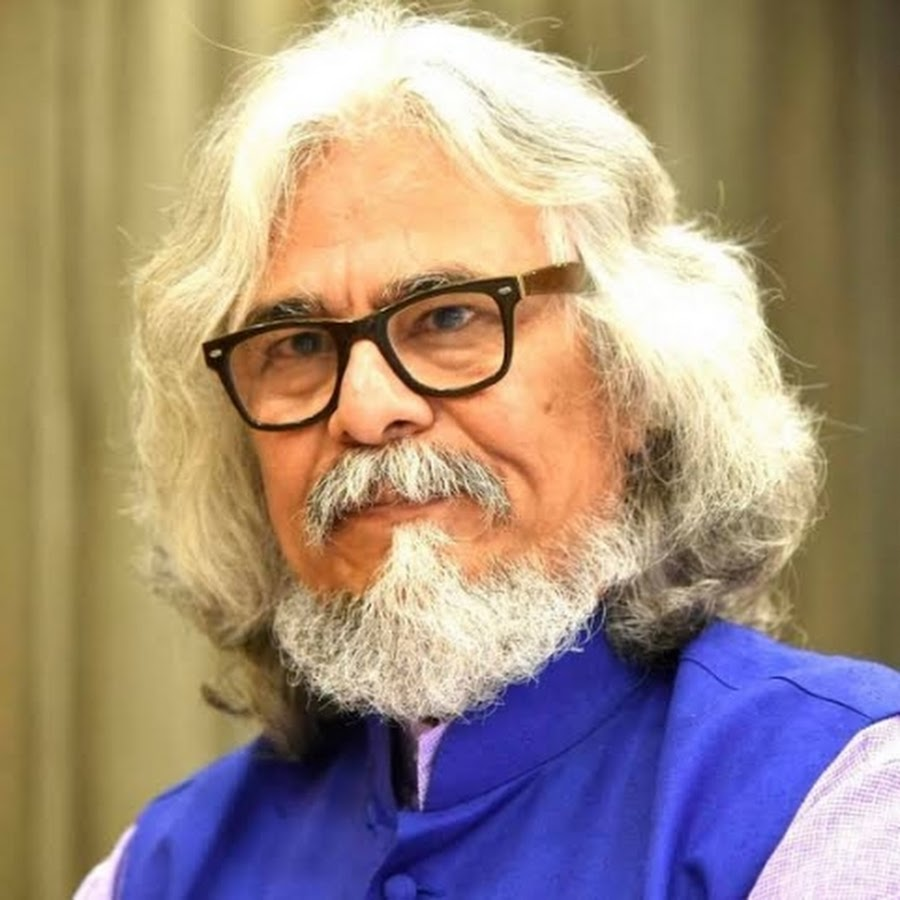
- Born: 29 June 1955 (age 71); Ahmedabad, Gujarat, India
- Education: Master's degree in Gujarati and English literature (Gujarat University), LLB
- Alma mater: St. Xavier's College, Ahmedabad, Gujarat University
- Occupations: Poet, author, lyricist, playwright, media personality
- Notable work: Tari Hatheli Ne, Maaro Varsad, Puchhine Thay Nahi Prem
- Father: Durgesh Shukla
- Awards: Padma Shri (2025)

Tushar Durgeshbhai Shukla (born 29 June 1955) is an Indian poet, author, and media personality known for his contributions to Gujarati literature and culture. He was awarded the Padma Shri, India's fourth-highest civilian honor, in the field of literature and education in 2025.

== Early life and education ==
Tushar Shukla was born into a family with a literary background; his father, Durgesh Shukla, was a Gujarati playwright, author, and poet. He completed his schooling in Gujarati medium from Swastik Shishu Vihar School in Ahmedabad. He pursued higher education at St. Xavier's College, Ahmedabad, studying Gujarati and English literature, followed by a Master's degree from Gujarat University's School of Languages. He also completed an LLB degree, though he did not practice law.

== Career ==
=== All India Radio ===
Shukla has had an extensive career with All India Radio, where he started as an announcer. He anchored popular shows and produced programs for children and youth at AIR, including 'Shanabhai and Shakrabhai.' He retired as the station director of AIR Rajkot.

=== Literary works ===
Tushar Shukla has authored over 30 published books, primarily poetry and essays exploring family issues and social observations. His poetry collections include Tari Hatheli Ne, Maaro Varsad, Puchhine Thay Nahi Prem, Mann Masti ane Motor Cycle, and Aashka. His poems have been included in textbooks in Gujarat and Maharashtra. Shukla has also contributed as a columnist for Gujarati newspapers such as Gujarat Samachar and Divya Bhaskar.

=== Media and other contributions ===
Shukla has also written songs and dialogues for television programs and Gujarati films. Several well-known singers, including Kavita Krishnamurthy, Roopkumar Rathod, Shyamal Munshi, Aarti Munshi, Mitali Singh, and Bhupinder Singh, have performed his lyrics. Music duo Shyamal-Saumil released a special CD featuring his poems.

He has also appeared as a guest artist in Gujarati films like Bey Yaar, Shubharambh, Vitamin She, and Love Ni Bhavai. Shukla teaches journalism at Gujarat University and the R.J. training center of L.J. College, and provides training at the regional training center of All India Radio.

== Selected works ==
- Tari Hatheli Ne (Poetry)
- Maaro Varsad (Poetry)
- Puchhine Thay Nahi Prem (Poetry)
- Coffee Break (Essays)
- Kanku no Suraj
- Lemon Tea (Essays)

== See also ==
- List of Gujarati-language writers
- List of Padma Shri award recipients (2020–2029)
