= Niilam Paanchal =

Indian film and television actress (born)

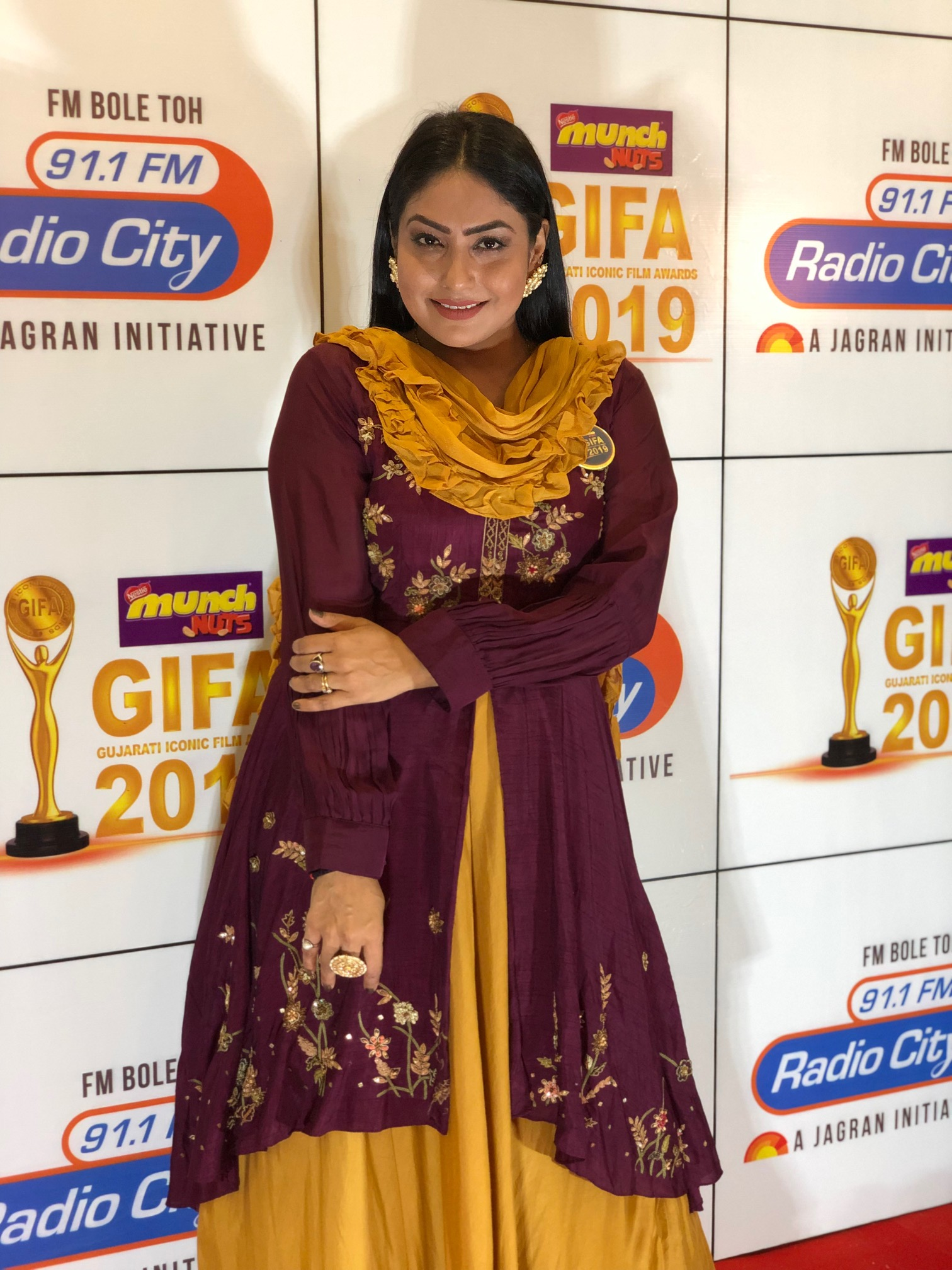
- Niilam Paanchal At GIFA Ahmedabad in 2019
- Born: Ahmedabad, Gujarat, India
- Occupation: Actress
- Years active: 2003–present
- Awards: Special Jury Award for Hellaro (2019)

Niilam Paanchal (also spelled Nilam Panchal or Neelam Panchal) is an Indian film and television actress. She appeared in several television series including Hamari Devrani, Ruk Jaana Nahin, Ek Veer Ki Ardaas...Veera, Lajwanti, and Ishqbaaaz. She acted in the 2019 Gujarati film Hellaro, for which she won Special Jury Award at the 66th National Film Awards.She married actor Mihir Rajda and have one Daughter.

== Personal life ==
She was married with Actor Mihir Rajda and have one daughter.

== Biography ==
Niilam studied at H. L College of Commerce, Ahmedabad. Initially she appeared in several Gujarati language television shows including Ek Daal Na Pankhi on Doordarshan, Pati Patni Ane Vavajodu, Geet Gunjan, Yuva Sangram, Parnya Atle Pati Gaya on ETV Gujarati, and Saraswatichandra on Zee Gujarati.

She made her film debut with the 2007 Gujarati film Sneh Na Sagpan. In 2019, She acted in Gujarati period drama film Hellaro, which won the National Film Award for Best Feature Film at the 66th National Film Awards and she earned Special Jury Award for her performance. The film has been theatrically released in India on 8 November 2019 to positive reviews and her acting is appreciated by the audiences.

She appeared in several Hindi television series including Hamari Devrani, Ruk Jaana Nahin, Ek Veer Ki Ardaas...Veera, Lajwanti, and Ishqbaaaz. In 2020, she played Parul, a Gujarati woman character, in the Marathi language television series Vaiju No. 1.

She played Kasturba Gandhi in the play Bharat Bhagyavidhata. She made her debut in Hindi cinema with the 2017 film Kaabil.

Presently, she is working in her next film Ekvismu Tiffin, directed by Vijaygiri Bava, which is set to release in 2021.

== Awards and accolades ==
Year	Award	Category	Nominated work	Result	Ref.
2019	National Film Awards	Special Jury Award	Hellaro	Won	

== Filmography ==
=== Films ===
Key
†	Denotes films that have not yet been released

Year	Film	Director	Role	Language
2017	Kaabil	Sanjay Gupta	Zafar's wife	Hindi
2019	Hellaro	Abhishek Shah	Leela	Gujarati
2021	21mu Tiffin	Vijaygiri Bava	Neetal's Mom	Gujarati
2022	Raado	Krishnadev Yagnik	Bhushan's Wife	Gujarati
2023	Vash	Krishnadev Yagnik	Beena	Gujarati
2024	Nasoor	Rishil Joshi	Jolly Seth	Gujarati
2026	Ruff and Tuff Kanya	Yash Vaishnav	Sarvadamini	Gujarati

=== Television ===
Year	Title	Role	References
2008–2012	Hamari Devrani	Rajeshwari Gautam Nanavati	
2011–2012	Ruk Jaana Nahin	Malti Devi Singh	
2012	Crime Patrol	advocate Gayatri	
2012–2015	Ek Veer Ki Ardaas...Veera	Amrit Kaur	
2015–2016	Lajwanti	Shakunta Kishan Lal Bharadwaj	
2016–2019	Ishqbaaaz	Sahil's Mother	
2016	Man Mein Hai Visshwas	Rasila	
2020	Vaiju No.1	Parul	
2024–2025	Dil Ko Tumse Pyaar Hua	Shobha Yashwant Agarwal	
2025–2026	Saru	Saroja Bajaj	

=== Web-series ===
Year	Title	Role	Notes
2021	Yamraj Calling		
2022	Reena's Beauty Studio		
