= Shital Shah =

Indian film and television actress, director, writer and editor (born 1965)

- Born: 9 June 1965 (age 60); Ahmedabad, Gujarat, India
- Occupations: Actress, Director, Writer, Editor
- Years active: 2001–present
- Children: Serena Shah (adopted daughter); Sara Shah (adopted daughter)
- Parents: Ashok Shah (father); Dr. Hina Shah (mother)
- Relatives: Shaina Shah (sister)
- Website: www.thelimelightpictures.in

Shital Shah is an Indian film and television actress, director, writer and editor, known for her works in Gujarati cinema. She is known for directing films such as Hutututu: Aavi Ramat Ni Rutu (2016), Duniyadari (2017), and Saatam Aatham (2022).

== Personal life ==
Shital Shah has adopted two daughters named Serena Shah (born 2018) and Sara Shah (born 2023), in 2018 and in 2023 respectively. She is the daughter of Ashok Shah and Dr. Hina Shah. She also has a younger sister named Shaina Shah.

== Filmography ==
=== Actor ===
Year	Film	Role
2007	My Friend Ganesha	Aarti
2016	Hutututu: Aavi Ramat Ni Rutu	Ashwarya
2022	Saatam Aatham	Chitra

=== Director ===
Year	Film	Director	Producer	Writer
2016	Hutututu: Aavi Ramat Ni Rutu	Yes		Yes
2017	Duniyadari	Yes		Yes
2022	Saatam Aatham	Yes		Yes
