= Mithun Chakraborty filmography =

The following is the complete filmography of Indian actor, television personality and producer Mithun Chakraborty, who works in Hindi cinema as well as in Bengali cinema. He has portrayed a variety of characters on screen and is also known for his dancing skills.

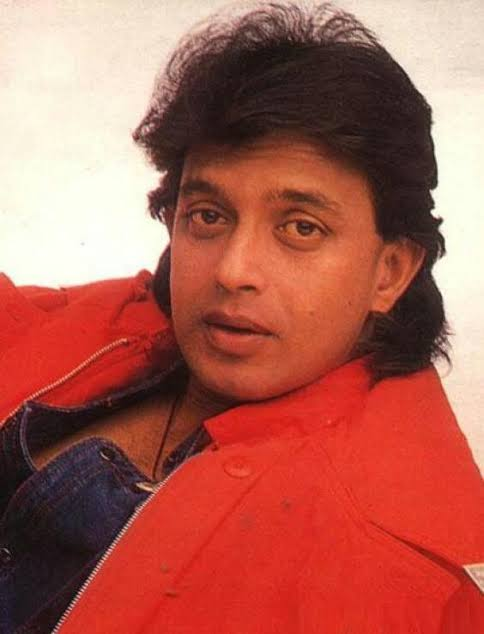
Mithun in 1987

== Films ==
Year	Title	Role	Language	Notes	Ref.
1976	Mrigayaa	Ghinua	Hindi	Film debut; National Film Award for Best Actor; also BFJA Award for Best Actor	
1976	Do Anjaane	Ghanti	Hindi		
1977	Mukti	Stage Artist	Hindi	Cameo	
1978	Hamara Sansar	Prem Kumar	Hindi		
1978	Phool Khile Hain Gulshan Gulshan	Vishal's friend	Hindi		
1978	Mera Rakshak	Vijay	Hindi		
1978	Nadi Theke Sagare	Sagar	Bengali	Debut in Bengali cinema	
1979	Tere Pyar Mein	Shekhar	Hindi		
1979	Amar Deep	Sajan	Hindi	Guest appearance	
1979	Surakshaa	CBI Officer Gopi / Gunmaster G-9 (Note: He played character with multiple names in the film.)	Hindi		
1979	Prem Vivah	Ajay	Hindi		
1979	Bhayaanak	Inspector Vijay	Hindi		
1979	Taraana	Shyam	Hindi		
1979	Habari		Hindi		
1980	The Naxalites	Amor Kal	Hindi		
1980	Banshari		Bengali		
1980	Aakhri Insaaf		Hindi		
1980	Khwab	Pratap Kumar Shrivastav	Hindi		
1980	Kasturi		Hindi		
1980	Sitara	Kundan	Hindi		
1980	Unees-Bees	Jai	Hindi		
1980	Taxi Chor	Rajesh, Ritesh (Note: He played dual roles in the film.)	Hindi		
1980	Patita	Jain	Hindi		
1980	Hum Paanch	Bheema	Hindi		
1980	Kismet	Moti	Hindi		
1980	Be-Shaque	Prakash	Hindi		
1981	Sameera	Nakul	Hindi		
1981	Ghamandee	Kamlesh	Hindi		
1981	Main Aur Mera Haathi	Ram, Raj	Hindi		
1981	Kalankini Kankabati	Shashanka Shekhar Rai	Bengali		
1981	Jeene Ki Arzoo	Naagraj 'Naagi'	Hindi		
1981	Hum Se Badhkar Kaun	Pappu / Tony	Hindi		
1981	Dhuan	Sunil Verma	Hindi		
1981	Laparwah	Shera / Suraj	Hindi		
1981	Wardat	CBI Officer Gopinath / Gunmaster G-9	Hindi		
1981	Upalabdhi	Rajen Sarkar / Raju	Bengali		
1981	Sahosh	Krishna / Kishanchand	Bengali		
1981	Pahari Phool		Bengali		
1982	Amne Samne	Gopi, Johny	Hindi		
1982	Ustadi Ustad Se	Rajesh / Raju	Hindi		
1982	Shoukheeen	Ravi Anand / Sakharam	Hindi		
1982	Ashanti	Shankar Dada	Hindi		
1982	Heeron Ka Chor	Mohan Khanna	Hindi		
1982	Troyee	Avik	Bengali		
1982	Adat Se Majboor	Shankar Shastri	Hindi		
1982	Sun Sajna	Raj Kumar	Hindi		
1982	Taqdeer Ka Badshah	Ratan	Hindi		
1982	Swami Dada	Suresh	Hindi		
1982	Agent Raaj	Rajesh Khashnobish / Agent Raaj / Bhabesh Kumar	Bengali		
1982	Disco Dancer	Anil / Jimmy	Hindi		
1983	Taqdeer	Vikram Singh	Hindi		
1983	Ke? Kibhabe?	Binod	Bengali	Dubbed in Hindi as Kaun? Kaise?	
1983	Lal Chunariya	Himself	Hindi	Special appearance	
1983	Woh Jo Hasina	Harish Maheshwari	Hindi		
1983	Karate	Bijoy	Bengali		
1983	Faraib	Vikas / Vicky	Hindi		
1983	Kaun? Kaisey?	Inspector Vinod	Hindi		
1983	Hum Se Hai Zamana	Shiva	Hindi		
1983	Mujhe Insaaf Chahiye	Suresh Rai	Hindi		
1983	Pasand Apni Apni	Sandeep Anand	Hindi		
1984	Wanted	Vikram	Hindi		
1984	Boxer	Shankar Ghoshal	Hindi		
1984	Sharara	Deepak	Hindi		
1984	Teri Baahon Mein	Dancer	Hindi	Guest appearance	
1984	Hanste Khelte	Mithun	Bengali	Dubbed in Hindi as Hanste Khelte	
1984	Ghar Ek Mandir	Ravi	Hindi		
1984	Tarkeeb	Dinesh	Hindi		
1984	Baazi	Salim Khan	Hindi		
1984	Rakta Bandhan	Chandan, Daku Kundan	Hindi		
1984	Jaag Utha Insan	Harimohan / Hari	Hindi		
1984	Teen Murti	Sanga	Bengali	Bilingual film	
1984	Jagir	Sanga	Hindi	Bilingual film	
1984	Kasam Paida Karnewale Ki	Satish Kumar, Avinash Kumar	Hindi		
1985	Anyay Abichar	Ghanashyam / Ghana	Bengali	Bilingual film	
1985	Aar Paar	Ghanashyam / Ghana	Hindi	Bilingual film	
1985	Maujaan Dubai Diyaan	Sher Singh	Punjabi		
1985	Pyar Jhukta Nahin	Ajay Khanna	Hindi		
1985	Aandhi-Toofan	Balwant Yadav / Ballu	Hindi		
1985	Chaar Maharathi	Raju	Hindi		
1985	Karmyudh	Inspector Vijay Kumar	Hindi		
1985	Yaadon Ki Kasam	Ravi Kapoor	Hindi		
1985	Ghulami	Jabhar	Hindi		
1985	Pyari Behna	Kalicharan / Kaali	Hindi		
1985	Bepanaah	Bajrang	Hindi		
1985	Maa Kasam	Dharma	Hindi		
1985	Karishma Kudrat Kaa	Sub-inspector Raj	Hindi		
1985	Baadal	Baadal	Hindi		
1986	Jaal	Shankar Verma	Hindi		
1986	Dilwaala	Ravi Kumar	Hindi		
1986	Swarag Se Sunder	Ravi Choudhary	Hindi		
1986	Muddat	Ravi Shankar Singh	Hindi		
1986	Baat Ban Jaye	Prakash	Hindi		
1986	Amma	Navin	Hindi		
1986	Karamdaata	Govinda	Hindi		
1986	Kismetwala	Raja	Hindi		
1986	Nasihat	Ranjeet	Hindi		
1986	Pyar Ke Do Pal	Ashok Choudhary	Hindi		
1986	Sheesha	Dinesh Prakash	Hindi		
1986	Ek Aur Sikander	Sikander	Hindi		
1986	Zindagani	Anand	Hindi		
1986	Aisa Pyaar Kahan	Suraj	Hindi		
1986	Main Balwaan	Tony	Hindi		
1986	Avinash	Avinash Sharma	Hindi		
1987	Deewana Tere Naam Ka	Shankar	Hindi		
1987	Mera Yaar Mera Dushman	Vinod Kumar	Hindi		
1987	Dance Dance	Ramu / Romeo	Hindi		
1987	Parivaar	Birju Madari	Hindi		
1987	Hawalaat	Mangal Dada	Hindi		
1987	Hiraasat	Rajesh Saxena / Raju	Hindi		
1987	Watan Ke Rakhwale	Arun Prakash	Hindi		
1987	Param Dharam	Vijay, Ravi	Hindi		
1988	Sagar Sangam	Gopal / Gopi	Hindi		
1988	Pyaar Ka Mandir	Vijay Kumar	Hindi		
1988	Charnon Ki Saugandh	Ravi	Hindi		
1988	Rukhsat	Arjun Rai	Hindi		
1988	Commando	Chander	Hindi		
1988	Waqt Ki Awaz	Vishwa Pratap	Hindi		
1988	Saazish	Anand Kumar	Hindi		
1988	Mar Mitenge	Laxman	Hindi		
1988	Jeete Hain Shaan Se	Johny, Himself in Title Song	Hindi		
1988	Agnee	Amit	Hindi		
1988	Gangaa Jamunaa Saraswathi	Shankar Qawaal	Hindi		
1989	Meri Zabaan	Krishna	Hindi		
1989	Bees Saal Baad	Suraj	Hindi		
1989	Mil Gayee Manzil Mujhe	Vijay Kumar Malhotra	Hindi		
1989	Guru	Guru Shankar Shrivastav 'Guru'	Hindi		
1989	Galiyon Ka Badshah	Sikander	Hindi		
1989	Swarna Trisha	Himadri Choudhary	Bengali	Dubbed in Hindi as Aakhri Badla	
1989	Hum Intezaar Karenge	Ajay	Hindi		
1989	Prem Pratigyaa	Raja	Hindi		
1989	Ilaaka	Raja	Hindi		
1989	Dost	Raja	Hindi		
1989	Garibon Ka Daata	Gopi	Hindi		
1989	Daata	Kundan Singh	Hindi		
1989	Mujrim	Shankar Bose	Hindi		
1989	Aakhri Ghulam	Bheema	Hindi		
1989	Hisaab Khoon Ka	Suraj	Hindi		
1989	Dana Paani	Satyaprakash Tripathi	Hindi		
1989	Ladaai	Dindayal Sharma, Shera	Hindi		
1989	Bhrashtachar	Inspector Ashutosh Das	Hindi		
1990	Lahu Ka Balidan		Hindi		
1990	Pyar Ke Naam Qurbaan	Billo Chaudhary	Hindi		
1990	Agneepath	Krishnan Iyer, M.A.	Hindi	Winner, Filmfare Award for Best Supporting Actor	
1990	Pyar Ka Karz	Ravi Shankar	Hindi		
1990	Pati Patni Aur Tawaif	Vijay Saxena	Hindi		
1990	Hum Se Na Takrana	Inspector Vijay	Hindi		
1990	Andha Bichar	Rakesh / Bullet	Bengali		
1990	Dushman	Rakesh / Bullet	Hindi		
1990	Gunahon Ka Devta	Inspector Baldev Raj, Advocate Suraj Sharma	Hindi		
1990	Paap Ki Kamaee	Inspector Ashwini, Deva	Hindi		
1990	Roti Kee Keemat	Shankar	Hindi		
1990	Shandar	Shankar	Hindi		
1991	Numbri Aadmi	Shankar / Dildaar Khan	Hindi		
1991	Shikari	Shankar	Hindi		
1991	Pratigyabadh	Shankar Yadav	Hindi		
1991	Trinetra	Shiva / Tony Fernandes	Hindi		
1991	Pyar Hua Chori Chori	Vijay Kumar	Hindi		
1991	Pyar Ka Devta	Vijay Kumar	Hindi		
1991	Swarg Yahan Narak Yahan	DCP Vijay Kumar, Suraj	Hindi		
1991	Jhoothi Shaan	Prakash	Hindi		
1992	Rajoo Dada	Rajoo	Hindi		
1992	Mere Sajana Saath Nibhana	Kanhaiya	Hindi		
1992	Tahader Katha	Shibnath	Bengali	Winner, National Film Award for Best Actor in a Leading Role; Winner, Bengal Film Journalists' Association – Best Actor Award	
1992	Ghar Jamai	Anil	Hindi		
1992	Dil Aashna Hai	Sunil	Hindi		
1992	Pitambar	Shankar	Hindi		
1993	Yugandhar		Hindi		
1993	Aadmi	Vijay Shrivastav	Hindi		
1993	Phool Aur Angaar	Professor Vijay Omkarnath Saxena	Hindi		
1993	Jeevan Ki Shatranj	C.I.D. Inspector Vijay Sharma	Hindi		
1993	Shatranj	Dinky Verma	Hindi		
1993	Krishan Avtaar	Krishan	Hindi		
1993	Meherbaan	Ravi Kumar	Hindi		
1993	Pardesi	Shiva, Shankar	Hindi		
1993	Tadipaar	Shankar	Hindi		
1993	Dalaal	Bhola	Bengali		
1993	Dalaal	Bhola	Hindi		
1994	Paramaatma	Madhav Acharya, Gopal	Hindi		
1994	Kranti Kshetra	Major Barkat Ali	Hindi		
1994	Cheetah	Inspector Amar	Hindi		
1994	Janta Ki Adalat	Shankar	Hindi		
1994	Yaar Gaddar	Shankar Verma	Hindi		
1994	Naaraaz	Deva	Hindi		
1994	Teesra Kaun	Himself	Hindi	Guest appearance	
1994	Rakhwale	Inspector Shankar	Hindi	Special appearance	
1995	Ravan Raaj: A True Story	ACP Arjun Verma	Hindi		
1995	Zakhmi Sipahi	D.H.C.P. Shakti	Hindi		
1995	Nishana	Inspector Suraj	Hindi		
1995	Jallaad	Vijay Bahadur "Amavas" Kunwar, Inspector Kranti Kumar	Bengali-Hindi	Filmfare Award for Best Performance in a Negative Role; Screen Award for Best Actor in a Negative Role	
1995	Ahankaar	Prabhat	Hindi	Dubbed in Bengali	
1995	Ab Insaf Hoga	Gauri Shankar	Hindi		
1995	Gunehgar	D.I.G. Ajay Thakur	Hindi		
1995	The Don	Devendra 'Deven' (Don)	Hindi		
1995	Bhagya Debata	Jagadish, Alfred	Bengali	Dubbed in Hindi as Krantikari	
1995	Diya Aur Toofan	Amar	Hindi		
1996	Nirbhay	Krishna	Hindi		
1996	Muqadar	Shiva	Hindi		
1996	Jurmana	Vijay Saxena	Hindi		
1996	Bhishma	Bhola / Inspector Bhishma	Hindi		
1996	Daanveer	Vijay Shrivastav	Hindi		
1996	Apne Dam Par	Ram	Hindi		
1996	Angaara	Sagar	Hindi		
1996	Jung	ACP Arjun Saxena	Hindi		
1996	Rangbaaz	Kundan, Kanhaiya, Banarasi (Note: He played triple roles in the film.)	Hindi	Triple role	
1997	Shapath	Commando Arjun / Surya	Hindi		
1997	Jodidar	Munna 'Captain'	Hindi		
1997	Loha	Arjun	Hindi		
1997	Kaalia	Kalicharan / Kaalia	Hindi		
1997	Gudia	John Mendez	Hindi		
1997	Daadagiri	Ajay Saxena	Hindi		
1997	Suraj	Suraj	Hindi		
1997	Jeevan Yudh	Inspector Deva Prakash	Hindi		
1998	Swami Vivekananda	Ramakrishna	Hindi	Winner, National Film Award for Best Actor in a Supporting Role	
1998	Sher-E-Hindustan	Police inspector Kranti Kumar	Hindi		
1998	Saazish	David	Hindi		
1998	Military Raaj	Major Anand	Hindi		
1998	Chandaal	Inspector Indrajeet / Chandaal	Hindi		
1998	Hatyara	Advocate Mahendra, Surya	Hindi		
1998	Ustadon Ke Ustad	Vishawnath	Hindi		
1998	Hitler	Jailor Siddhant Kumar Sharma	Hindi		
1998	Devta	Balram / Ballu Tiger	Hindi		
1998	Mard	ACP Arjun	Hindi		
1998	Do Numbri	Raju	Hindi		
1998	Yamraaj	Birju	Hindi		
1998	Pyasi Aatma	Himself	Hindi	Guest appearance	
1998	Himmatwala	Kishan	Hindi		
1998	Gunda	Shankar	Hindi		
1998	Mafia Raaj	Inspector Suraj	Hindi		
1998	Sahara Jaluchi	Biju	Odia		
1999	Ding Dong		Bengali		
1999	Heeralal Pannalal	Heeralal and himself	Hindi		
1999	Sikandar Sadak Ka	Sikandar	Hindi		
1999	Kahani Kismat Ki	Prashant	Hindi		
1999	Ganga Ki Kasam	Shankar	Hindi		
1999	Sanyasi Mera Naam	Shankar Sanyasi	Hindi		
1999	Benaam	Prakash / Kipi	Hindi		
1999	Aaya Toofan	Arjun Singh / Toofan	Hindi		
1999	Aaag Hi Aag	Inspector Ajay Singh	Hindi		
1999	Shera	Jai Khurana / Shera	Hindi		
1999	Phool Aur Aag	Zimandar Deva	Hindi		
1999	Tabaahi - The Destroyer	Major Dig Vijay Sanyal	Hindi		
1999	Maa Kasam	Inspector Ajay Shastri	Hindi		
1999	Sautela	Arjun	Hindi		
1999	Dada	Inspector Devraj / Dada Thakur	Hindi		
2000	Sultaan	Abhimanyu / Sultan	Hindi		
2000	Jwalamukhi	Jwala Singh	Hindi		
2000	Billa No. 786	Shankar	Hindi		
2000	Aaj Ka Ravan	Shankar	Hindi		
2000	Qurbaniyaan		Hindi		
2000	Kaali Topi Laal Rumaal		Hindi		
2000	Sabse Bada Beiman		Hindi		
2000	Justice Chowdhary	Justice Chowdhary	Hindi		
2000	Agniputra	Arjun Dhanraj	Hindi		
2000	Babu Badshah		Hindi		
2000	Chaka	Manik Mondal	Bengali		
2000	Nisiddha Nodi		Assamese		
2001	Bhairav	Rakesh / Bhairav	Hindi		
2001	Khatron Ke Khiladi	Chhaila Bihari	Hindi		
2001	Zahreela	Dusyanti Kumar	Hindi		
2001	Bengal Tiger	Police inspector Prashant Verma	Hindi		
2001	Meri Pyaari Bahania Banegi Dulhania	Keshav	Hindi		
2001	Baghaawat – Ek Jung	Krishna	Hindi		
2001	Banih Bahaniya Hamar		Bhojpuri		
2001	Arjun Devaa	Arjun Poojari Singh	Hindi		
2001	Meri Adalat		Hindi		
2002	Titli	Rana Roy / Rohit	Bengali		
2002	Marshal	Manohar Singh / Marshal	Hindi		
2002	Mawali No.1		Hindi		
2002	Bangali Babu		Bengali		
2002	Ferari Fauj	Ashok Chatterjee	Bengali		
2002	Hindustani Sipahi	Ashok Chatterjee	Hindi		
2002	Qaidi	Ravi Verma / Kalishankar	Hindi		
2002	Sabse Badkar Hum	Amar	Hindi		
2002	Gautam Govinda	Gautam / Govinda	Hindi		
2003	Chaalbaaz	Vijay Khanna	Hindi		
2003	Guru	Raja / Guru	Bengali		
2003	Santrash	Montu	Bengali		
2003	Ae Jugara Krushna Sudama		Odia		
2003	Raasta	Jagannath Halder	Bengali		
2004	Swapne Dekha Rajkanya		Bengali	Guest appearance	
2004	Barood	DSP Barunoday Basak / Barood	Bengali		
2004	Raja Babu	Raja Babu	Bengali		
2004	Coolie	Shibnath Roy / Shiba	Bengali		
2005	Elaan	Baba Sikander	Hindi		
2005	Devdoot		Bengali		
2005	Arjun Rickshawala		Bengali		
2005	Qatal-E-Aam		Hindi		
2005	Cheetah	Rudranil Banerjee / Cheetah	Bengali		
2005	Chore Chore Mastuto Bhai	Manik	Bengali		
2005	Shaktimaan		Bengali		
2005	Classic Dance of Love		Hindi		
2005	Dada	Krishna Shankar / Dada	Bengali		
2005	Lucky: No Time for Love	Retired Colonel Pindidas Kapoor	Hindi		
2005	Yuddho	DSP Agnishwar Roy	Bengali		
2006	Chingaari	Bhuvan Panda	Hindi		
2006	Insaaf Ki Jung		Hindi		
2006	Kachchi Sadak	Qawali Singer Shankar	Hindi	Special appearance	
2006	Hungama	Ajoy / Hanuman Prasad Bandwala	Bengali		
2006	Dil Diya Hai	Rony	Hindi		
2006	MLA Fatakeshto	Krishna Dev Chatterjee / Fatakeshto	Bengali	Winner, Anandalok Best Actor Award	
2006	Sun Zarra	Bihari Babu	Hindi		
2006	Abhimanyu	Abhimanyu Nag	Bengali		
2007	Guru	Manik Dasgupta / Nanaji	Hindi		
2007	Tulkalam	CBI officer Tanmay Sanyal / Toofan	Bengali		
2007	Minister Fatakeshto	Krishna Dev Chatterjee / Fatakeshto	Bengali		
2007	Tiger	Prof. Indrajit Sen / Tiger	Bengali		
2007	Om Shanti Om	Himself	Hindi	Special appearance	
2007	Mahaguru	DSP Rudra Sen, Guru	Bengali		
2008	My Name Is Anthony Gonsalves	Priest Braganza	Hindi	Cameo	
2008	Tolly Lights	Himself	Bengali	Special appearance	
2008	Satyameba Jayate	Vinayak Chakraborty / Pandeya	Bengali		
2008	Kaalpurush	Father	Bengali		
2008	Don Muthu Swami	Don Muthuswami	Hindi		
2008	Bhole Shankar	Shankar	Bhojpuri		
2008	C Kkompany	Dattubhai	Hindi		
2008	Heroes	Dr. Maqbool	Hindi		
2008	Yuvvraaj	Sikander Mirza	Hindi		
2009	Chandni Chowk to China	Dada	Hindi		
2009	Zor Lagaa Ke...Haiya!	Raavan	Hindi		
2009	Luck	Major Jawar Pratap Singh	Hindi		
2009	Chal Chalein	Prosecuting Lawyer	Hindi		
2009	Baabarr	S. P. Dwivedi	Hindi		
2009	Phir Kabhi	Hari Singh	Hindi		
2010	Veer	Prithvi Singh	Hindi		
2010	Golapi Ekhon Bilatey	Mithun	Bengali	Bangladeshi' Production	
2010	Rehmat Ali	Rehmat Ali	Bengali		
2010	Handa And Bhonda	Mridul Roy / Handa	Bengali		
2010	Raakh		Hindi		
2010	Shukno Lanka	Chinu Nandi	Bengali	Winner, Star Jahlsa Awards for Best Actor Award in the Critics category	
2010	Target: The Final Mission	Adv. Anthony D' Souza	Bengali		
2010	Golmaal 3	Pritam (Pappu)	Hindi		
2011	F.A.L.T.U	Himself	Hindi	Special appearance	
2011	Ami Shubhash Bolchi	Debabrata Bose	Bengali		
2012	Mahasangram		Bhojpuri		
2012	Nobel Chor	Bhanu	Bengali		
2012	Zindagi Tere Naam	Siddharth Singh	Hindi	Guest appearance	
2012	Housefull 2	JD / Jagga Daku	Hindi		
2012	Le Halwa Le	Harshabardhan Banerjee	Bengali		
2012	OMG – Oh My God!	Leeladhar Maharaj	Hindi		
2012	Khiladi 786	Tatya Tukaram Tendulkar	Hindi		
2013	Rocky	Fatakeshto	Bengali	Special appearance in the Song "Rocky Bhai"	
2013	Enemmy	CBI Officer Yogandhar Vishnoi	Bengali		
2013	Boss	Satyakant Shastri	Hindi	Cameo	
2014	Kaanchi: The Unbreakable	Shyam Kakra	Hindi		
2014	Kick	Ratan Lal Singh	Hindi	Guest appearance	
2014	Entertainment	Saakshi's father	Hindi	Cameo	
2015	Gopala Gopala	Leeladhar	Telugu	Cameo	
2015	Herogiri	Dibakar Barman / Kaka	Bengali		
2015	Hawaizaada	Pandit Subbaraya Shastri	Hindi		
2015	Naxal	Anirban Sen	Bengali		
2015	Yagavarayinum Naa Kaakka	Mudhaliyar	Tamil	Tamil debut	
2015	Ek Nadir Galpo: Tale of a River	Darakeshwar	Bengali		
2016	Malupu	Mudhaliyar	Telugu		
2017	Hason Raja	Hason Raja	Bengali	Bangladeshi film	
2017	Golmaal	Buddhuram Dhol	Bengali		
2018	Jole Jongole		Bengali		
2018	The Villain	ACP Brahmavar	Kannada	Cameo	
2018	Genius	NSA Chief Jaishankar Prasad	Hindi		
2019	The Tashkent Files	Shyam Sunder Tripathi	Hindi		
2021	12 'O' Clock	Debu	Hindi		
2022	The Kashmir Files	IAS Brahma Dutt	Hindi		
2022	Projapati	Gour Chakraborty	Bengali		
2023	Anaari is Back	Abbujaan	Hindi	Special appearance	
2023	Kabuliwala	Rahmat Ali	Bengali		
2024	Shastri	Parimal Sanyal / Shastri	Bengali		
2024	Shontaan	Sharadindu Bose	Bengali		
2025	Shreeman v/s Shreemati	Amal Chowdhury	Bengali		
2025	Riwaj	Ramzan Qadir	Hindi	Cameo	
2025	The Bengal Files	Madman Chatur	Hindi		
2025	Projapati 2	Gour Chakraborty	Bengali		
2026	Jailer 2	Chakri Kalpak	Tamil		
2026	Bohurupi: The Golden Daku	Leader of Bangla Gang	Bengali	Cameo	
2027	Fauzi †		Telugu		

== Television ==
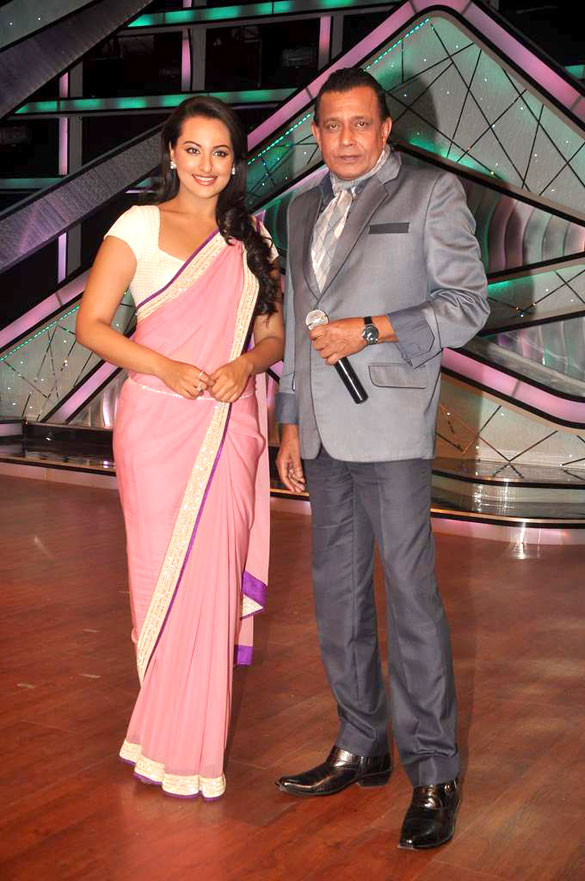
Mithun with Sonakshi Sinha on the sets of Dance India Dance in 2012

Year	Show	Role	Language
2007–2013, 2023,2025	Dance Bangla Dance	Grandmaster (Judge)	Bengali
2009–2018	Dance India Dance	Grandmaster (Judge)	Hindi
2011-12	Dadagiri Unlimited	Host	Bengali
2013	Bigg Boss Bangla	Host	Bengali
2017–2018	The Drama Company	Host	Hindi
2020	Dance Plus (season 5)	Guest	Hindi
2021	Dance Dance Junior	Host	Bengali
2021	Dance Plus (season 6)	Guest	Hindi
2022	Hunarbaaz: Desh Ki Shaan	Judge	Hindi
2022	Bestseller	Lokesh Pramanik	Hindi

== Music video appearances ==
Year	Title	Role	Ref.
1988	Mile Sur Mera Tumhara	Himself	

== Unreleased films ==
The following is a list of unreleased films featuring Mithun Chakraborty in a proper chronological order. In his long film career, Mithun has worked in a number of films, which have never been released.

Year	Title	Language	Director	Ref.
1976	Sarhad	Hindi	J. P. Dutta	
1980	Kismat Ki Baazi	Hindi		
1984	Chabi Chor Ke Haath	Hindi	Mohan Choti	
1984	Rishte Ke Deewar	Hindi	Datta Keshav	
1985	Sada Suhaagan	Hindi	??	
1988	Khwaaish	Hindi	??	
1990	Ahsaanmand	Hindi	Biswajeet	
1991	Soochna	Hindi	Ravikant Nagaich	
1991	Parakrami	Hindi	Vijay Deep	
1991	Jab Pyar Hua	Hindi	??	
1992	Chor Lutere	Hindi	Rajeev Kumar	
1992	Magroor	Hindi	Abbas–Mustan	
1992	Maha Paap	Hindi	Surendra Mohan Ahuja	
1993	Jai Devaa	Hindi	Lawrence D'Souza	
1995	Police Mujrim	Hindi	Rajesh Vakil	
1995	Warrant	Hindi	Lawrence D'souza	
1996	Maang Le Tu Maang Le	Hindi	K. R. Reddy	
1996	War	Hindi	Saroj Chaudhari	
1998	Vachan	Hindi	Sikander Bharti	
1998	Babu Badshah	Hindi	T. L. V. Prasad	
1999	Balidaan	Hindi	T. L. V. Prasad	
1999	Dushmani	Hindi	Imran Khalid	
2000	Sazaa	Hindi	??	
2000	Kaaldev	Hindi	T. L. V. Prasad	
2001	Phandebaaz	Hindi	T. L. V. Prasad	
2005	Mother Teresa	English & Malayalam	Rajeevnath	
2007	Lal Pahare'r Katha	Bengali	Remo D'Souza	
2009	Namurd	Hindi	Rajeev Kumar	
2010	Yeh Sunday Kyun Aata Hai	Hindi	Rabinder Parasher	
2012	Maqsad	Hindi	Anoop Jalota	
