= List of awards and nominations received by Mithun Chakraborty =

Actor filmography

Mithun Chakraborty awards and nominations
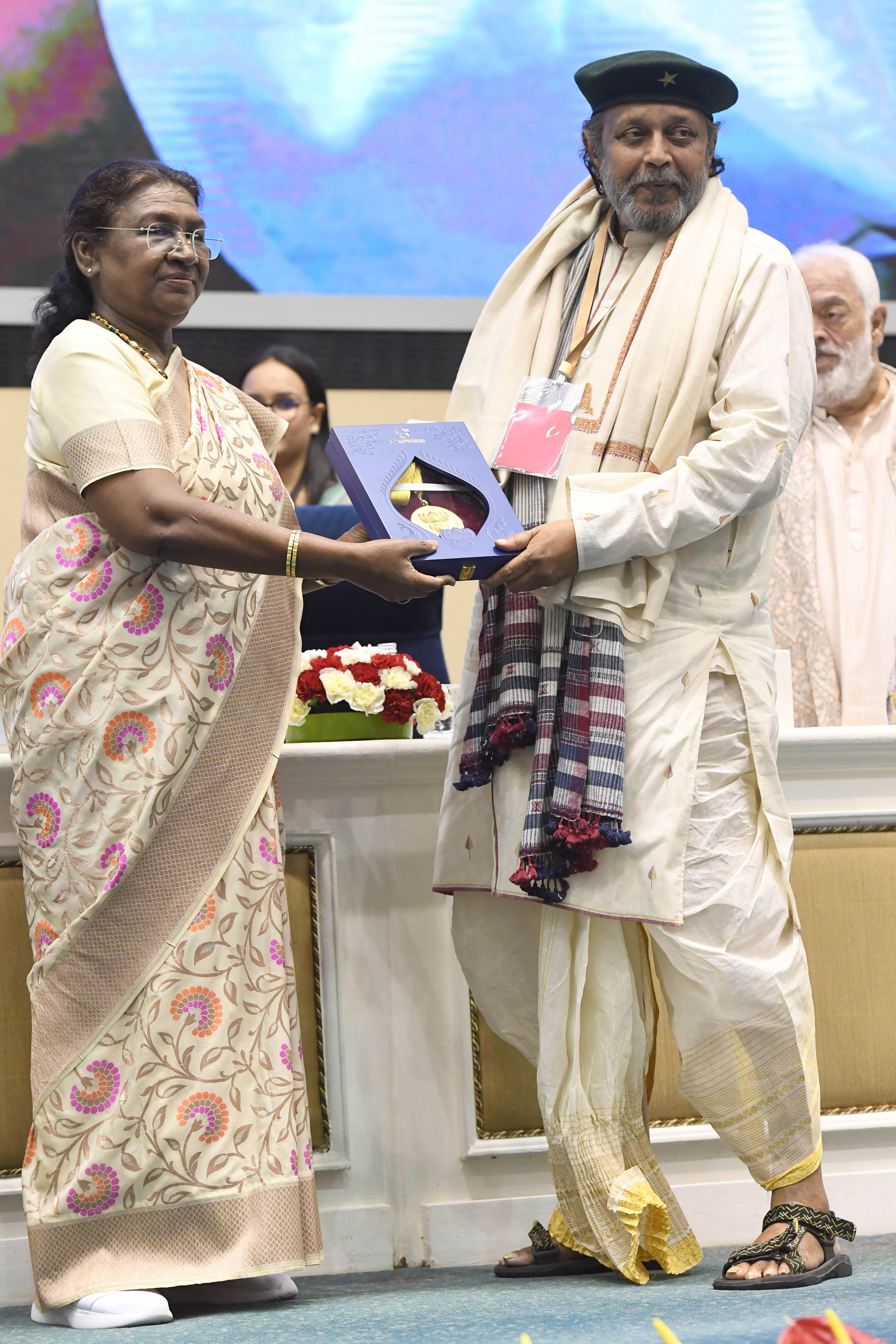
- Mithun being felicitated with Dadasaheb Phalke Award by President Murmu
Awards and nominations
Award	Wins	Nominations
Filmfare Awards	4	8
IIFA Awards	0	3
National Film Awards	4	5
Screen Awards	1	3

This is a list of awards and nominations that was received by Indian actor Mithun Chakraborty.

Recently, he received the Dadasaheb Phalke Award at the 70th National Film Awards ceremony held in India on October 8, 2024.

== National Film Awards ==
Year	Category	Work	Result	Ref.
1977	Best Actor	Mrigayaa	Won	
1993	Best Actor	Tahader Katha	Won	
1996	Best Supporting Actor	Swami Vivekananda	Won	
2022	Dadasaheb Phalke Award	for contribution to Indian cinema	Won	

== Filmfare Awards ==
Year	Category	Work	Result	Ref.
1991	Best Supporting Actor	Agneepath	Won	
1996	Best Performance in a Negative Role	Jallaad	Won	
2008	Best Supporting Actor	Guru	Nominated	
2023	Best Supporting Actor	The Kashmir Files	Nominated	

== Filmfare Awards Bangla ==
Year	Category	Work	Result	Ref.
2023	Best Actor in a leading role	Projapoti	Won	
2024	Best Actor (Critics')	Kabuliwala	Won	

== Screen Awards ==
Year	Category	Work	Result	Ref.
1996	Best Villain	Jallaad	Won	
2008	Best Supporting Actor	Guru	Nominated	
2013	Best Actor in a Negative Role	OMG – Oh My God!	Nominated	

== IIFA Awards ==
Year	Category	Work	Result	Ref.
2008	Best Supporting Actor	Guru	Nominated	
2011	Best Supporting Actor	Golmaal 3	Nominated	
2013	Best Supporting Actor	OMG – Oh My God!	Nominated	

== BFJA Awards / WBFJA Awards ==
Year	Category	Work	Result	Ref.
1977	Best Actor	Mrigayaa	Won	
1995	Best Actor	Tahader Katha	Won	
2022	Best Actor (Popular Choice)	Projapoti	Won	

== Zee Cine Awards ==
Year	Category	Work	Result	Ref.
2011	Best Actor in a Supporting Role – Male	Golmaal 3	Nominated	
2013	Best Actor in a Comic Role	OMG – Oh My God!	Nominated	

== Anandalok Awards ==
Year	Category	Work	Result	Ref.
2001	Best Actor	Chaka	Won	
2007	Best Actor	Minister Fatakeshto	Won	

== Stardust Awards ==
Year	Category	Work	Result	Ref.
2007	Lifetime Achievement		Honored	
2007	Role Model of the Year		Won	
2007	Best Supporting Actor	Guru	Nominated	
2013	Best Actor in a Negative Role	OMG – Oh My God!	Nominated	

== Apsara Awards ==
Year	Category	Work	Result	Ref.
2008	Best Actor in a Supporting Role	Guru	Nominated	

== Star Jalsha Entertainment Awards ==
Year	Category	Work	Result	Ref.
2011	Best Actor (Critics)	Shukno Lanka	Won	

== Raj Kapoor Award ==
Year	Result
2021	Won

== Padma Bhushan ==
Year	Result
2024	Won

== Banga Bibhushan ==
Year	Result
2013	Won
