= Ashu Trikha =

Indian film director and producer (born 1963)

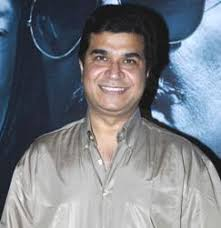
- Born: June 26, 1963 (age 62); Mumbai, India
- Occupations: Director, screenwriter
- Years active: 2001–present
- Spouse: Samriti Trikha
- Children: Anmol Trikha, Akshita Trikha

Ashu Trikha is an Indian film director and producer of Bollywood. He started his career with Arjun Rampal movie Deewaanapan which was produced by Vashu Bhagnani. Sheesha in 2005, followed by Mithun Chakraborty starrer Zindagi Tere Naam. His next venture Baabarr had Mithun and Om Puri followed by Mithun Chakraborty's home production Enemmy with an ensemble cast of Mithun Chakraborty, Sunil Shetty, Mahakshay Chakraborty, Kay Kay Menon and Zakir Hussain.

== Filmography ==
Year	Film	Language	Notes
2001	Deewaanapan	Hindi	
2005	Sheesha	Hindi	
2006	Alag	Hindi	
2009	Baabarr	Hindi	
2012	Zindagi Tere Naam	Hindi	
2013	Enemmy	Bengali / Hindi	
2014	Koyelaanchal	Hindi	
2018	Veerey Ki Wedding	Hindi	
