= Faraib =

- Official Poster
- Directed by: Rajat Rakshit
- Produced by: R. Singh; Naresh K. Bhatia
- Starring: Mithun Chakraborty; Ranjeeta
- Music by: Bappi Lahiri
- Release date: 19 August 1983
- Running time: 125 minutes
- Country: India
- Language: Hindi

Faraib is a 1983 Indian Hindi-language feature film directed by Rajat Rakshit, starring Mithun Chakraborty, Ranjeeta in lead roles.

== Cast ==
- Mithun Chakraborty as Vikas "Vicky"
- Ranjeeta as Meena
- Shreeram Lagoo as Bansi
- Nazir Hussain as Mr. Khanna
- Mukri as College Principal
- Jagdeep as Raghunath
- Mohan Choti as Balmukund
- Mehmood Junior as Prabhudas

== Soundtrack ==
Song	Singer
"Apne Liye Hi Jeena"	Kishore Kumar
"Baandho Nahi Rasmon Se"	Kishore Kumar
"Yeh Mausam Pyar Ka, Yeh Aalam Pyar Ka, Dil Se Dil Milao"	Kishore Kumar, Asha Bhosle
"Kabhi To Aayega"	Lata Mangeshkar
