= Aseem Ali Khan =

Indian actor (born 1983)

- Born: 18 August; Bhopal, Madhya Pradesh, India
- Occupations: Actor, model
- Years active: 2005–present
- Parent(s): Rehmat Ali Khan (Father); Shameem Khan (Mother)
- Relatives: Ustad Hafiz Ali Khan (grandfather), Amjad Ali Khan (uncle)

Aseem Ali Khan (born; 18 August) is an Indian actor and model. He is majorly known for his role in the films Zindagi Tere Naam, Kyun Hua Achanak and his recent thriller Page 16. In 2005, he was voted India's most photogenic man at Mr. India Pageant.

== Early life ==
He was born on 18 August in Bhopal, India, to Shameem Khan, who was a radio presenter and sarod musician Rehmat Ali Khan. Aseem Ali khan is the grandson of Padma Bhushan late Ustad Hafiz Ali Khan and nephew of Sarod maestro Ustad Amjad Ali Khan. When Aseem was two years old, his family lived through the Bhopal disaster.

== Career ==
=== Modelling ===
Upon moving to Mumbai in 2005, Aseem Ali Khan started modelling and participated in several TV shows and music videos. In 2005, he was voted India's most photogenic male model in the Mr. India Pageant and in 2006 followed by Hunk of the Month by Cosmopolitan magazine. The awards gave him more recognition and this caught the attention of the Bollywood Industry. Since then, Aseem has modelled for several clothing companies such as Hugo Boss, John Player and Killer Jeans. He is also a brand ambassador for the Kaya Designer Lounge.

=== Acting ===
While he was working as a model, Aseem Ali Khan completed acting courses held by Sutindar Singh, Raj Jagdish and Kishor Namit Kapoor to improve his acting skills. He was also mentored by the theatre actor Rakesh Chaturvedi. Soon afterwards, in 2006, he had a small cameo in the blockbuster-hit film Dus, directed by Anubhav Sinha. It was then that he faced the camera with some of the most prestigious Bollywood actors for the first time, including Sanjay Dutt, Abhishek Bachchan, Shilpa Shetty, Zayed Khan and Diya Mirza. This was a turning point in Aseem Ali Khan's career as he immersed himself fully in acting. In 2012, he experienced his first main leading role in Ashu Trikha's Zindagi Tere Naam, with Mithun Chakraborthy, Ranjeeta, Dia Mirza and Priyanka Mehta. The film is based on the internationally acclaimed, Nicholas Sparks novel The Notebook (2004 film) and the 2004 movie of the same name. In 2013, Aseem appeared as the main lead in the romantic suspense thriller Kyun Hua Achanak, directed by Rajendra Shiv. He played an extremely shrewd and clever Vaditya. The film focuses on how the lives of four opportunistic individuals, in today's current scenario, cross each other and take a different turn. Recently he has portrayed Ajay, a character troubled by his past, in the paranormal thriller Page 16, written and directed by Shamshad Pathan, starring Bidita Bag, Kiran Kumar and others. Ajay is a very devoted father and husband, trapped between his mistakes from the past and scary paranormal activity that is happening in his house. Page 16 was released in August 2018. In 2019 Aseem is doing a different type of thriller film. The film is called "Sridevi Bungalow" The film has Priya Prakash Varrier, Priyanshu Chatterjee and Mukesh Rishi as the leading actors.

== Personal life and charity work ==
He is currently working on a project in which he gives a platform to talented young artists. Aseem Ali Khan is the joint secretary at the Ustad Hafiz Ali Khan Sangeet Academy in Bhopal.

== Filmography ==
Year	Film	Director	Genre	Notes
2019	Sridevi Bungalow	Prasanth Mambully	Suspense, Thriller	Post Production
2018	Page 16	Shamshad Pathan	Horror, Thriller	Released
2013	Kyun Hua Achanak	Rajendra Shiv	Romance, Thriller, Suspense	Released
2012	Zindagi Tere Naam	Ashu Trikha	Romance	Released
2005	DUS	Anubhav Sinha	Action, Crime, Drama	Released
