= Tarkeeb =

- Directed by: Ravikant Nagaich
- Produced by: S Krishnamurthy
- Starring: Mithun Chakraborty; Ranjeeta; Shakti Kapoor; Madan Puri; Sharat Saxena
- Music by: Bappi Lahiri
- Release date: 16 March 1984
- Running time: 110 minutes
- Country: India
- Language: Hindi

Tarkeeb is a 1984 Indian Hindi-language film directed by Ravikant Nagaich. The film stars Mithun Chakraborty, Ranjeeta and Shakti Kapoor. The film was a remake of the 1979 Telugu film Driver Ramudu.

== Cast ==
- Mithun Chakraborty as Dinesh
- Ranjeeta as Bela
- Shakti Kapoor as Sundar
- Madan Puri as Naagpal
- Sharat Saxena as Vikram

== Soundtrack ==
Lyrics: Anjaan

Song	Singer
"Palkon Ke"	Kishore Kumar
"Chhuk Chhuk"	Kishore Kumar, Asha Bhosle
"O Jaani"	Bappi Lahiri, Asha Bhosle
"Dil Ki Lorry"	Bappi Lahiri, Lata Mangeshkar
"Dil Mera"	Amit Kumar, S. Janaki
"Tujhse Kahoon"	S. P. Balasubrahmanyam
