= Gunahon Ka Devta (1990 film) =

1990 film by Kawal Sharma

- Poster
- Directed by: Kawal Sharma
- Produced by: Arun S. Thakur
- Starring: Mithun Chakraborty; Ranjeeta; Sangeeta Bijlani; Aditya Pancholi; Sujata Mehta
- Music by: Anu Malik
- Release date: 6 July 1990
- Running time: 135 min.
- Country: India
- Language: Hindi

Gunahon Ka Devta (Translation: The Angel of crimes) is a 1990 Indian Hindi-language action film directed by Kawal Sharma, starring Mithun Chakraborty, Ranjeeta, Sangeeta Bijlani, Aditya Pancholi, Sujata Mehta, Shakti Kapoor, Paresh Rawal, Kulbhushan Kharbanda, Danny Denzongpa. This film was first offered to Divya Bharti, but her parents didn't permit her because she was too young to play Mithun's heroine. In 1990, Mithun Chakraborty played a double role for the second time, after Paap Ki Kamaee and both films were directed by Kawal Sharma.

== Plot ==
Inspector Baldev Sharma, an honest and diligent officer, leading an honest life with his wife and young son Suraj is falsely trapped in a murder case and subsequently jailed. His wife manages to raise their son to become an honest police officer. Suraj takes it upon himself to prove his father's innocence.

== Cast ==
- Mithun Chakraborty as Inspector Baldev Raj Sharma / Suraj Sharma (Double Role)
- Ranjeeta as Mrs. Sharma
- Sangeeta Bijlani as Bhinde's Sister
- Aditya Pancholi as Sunny Khanna
- Sujata Mehta as Inspector Shilpa Verma
- Shakti Kapoor as Fake Police Inspector Bhinde
- Paresh Rawal as Advocate Khanna
- Kulbhushan Kharbanda as Dabar / Goenka
- Danny Dengzongpa as Raghuveer
- Bob Christo as Bob
- Brij Gopal
- Viju Khote as Cook
- Kim as Item number
- Disco Shanti as item number
- Subbiraj as Police Inspector Verma

== Music ==
Lyrics: Indeevar

Song	Singer
Ae Sanam Ae Sanam (v-1)	Kumar Sanu, Alka Yagnik
Ae Sanam Ae Sanam (v-2)	Shabbir Kumar, Sadhana Sargam
Aap Hi Se Dosti, Aap Hi Se Pyar	Sadhana Sargam, Anu Malik
Karwachauth Ka Vrat	Sadhana Sargam
Kahin Tu Woh To Nahin	Shabbir Kumar, Kavita Krishnamurthy
Hum Goa Ka Jenny Nahin	Asha Bhosle
