= Sheesha (2005 film) =

- Poster
- Directed by: Ashu Trikha
- Written by: Sanjay Masoom (dialogue)
- Story by: A. Muthu
- Produced by: Guddu Dhanoa; Sunil Saini; Deepak Sharma
- Starring: Sonu Sood; Neha Dhupia
- Cinematography: Raju Kaygee
- Edited by: A.Muthu
- Music by: Songs: Dilip Sen–Sameer Sen; Background Score: Dilip Sen–Sameer Sen; Sohail Sen
- Release date: 11 February 2005
- Running time: 140 minutes
- Country: India
- Language: Hindi

Sheesha (transl. The Mirror) is an Indian Hindi-language psychological erotic thriller film produced by Guddu Dhanoa and Sunil Saini. It was directed by Ashu Trikha and stars Neha Dhupia, Sonu Sood, Eilidh MacQueen, Nijju Mavani, Nares Ngamseera, Vivek Shaq, and Robert Slater. The film was also a production coordinated by Mona Kapoor. The film's music was composed by Dileep Sen and Sameer Sen. The film's plot is inspired by the Tamil-language film Vaalee (1999).

== Plot ==
Businesswoman Sia Malhotra lives a wealthy lifestyle in Bangkok, along with her twin, Ria, who is deaf and dumb due to a neurological disorder. She meets with Raj Oberoi, and both fall in love. Their endeavors to cure Ria are all in vain. Sia plans to travel to the United States to improve her business and has no one to look after Ria. So she decides to marry Raj so that he could move in with Ria and look after her. Raj agrees, and both obtain a marriage certificate and Sia departs for America. Sia does not know that after her return she will be a suspect in the brutal killing of a female Caucasian, Diana, and will not be permitted to leave Bangkok; and she will face further trauma and shock when she finds that her sister has been preying on her husband. After a confrontation between the two sisters, Ria beats Sia and leaves for Raj as Sia. She tricks him into traveling away from Sia. Soon, Raj discovers that it is Ria, not Sia, who is with him. Sia then arrives. An angered Ria tries to kill Sia, but Raj interrupts and Ria accidentally falls off the building. Raj tries to save her but Ria realizes her folly and lets go of Raj's hands killing herself.

== Cast ==
- Sonu Sood as Raj Oberoi
- Neha Dhupia as Sia Malhotra / Ria Malhotra (Double Role)
- Vivek Shauq as Sameer

== Music ==
The song listing is as follows.

Song	Singer(s)
Yaar ko Maine (Male)	Kunal Ganjawala
Assi Ishq Da Dard	Richa Sharma, Shehzad
Main Ho Gaye	Alka Yagnik, Shehzad
Yaar Ko Maine (Female)	Madhusree
Mujhe Jeena Sikha Do Naa	Shreya Ghosal, Kunal Ganjawala
Kar Mundiya	Sonu Kakkar
Moods	Richa Sharma

== Reception ==
Rohan Sonalkar of Rediff.com wrote, "Sheesha is a paisa vasool film if you want to watch Neha Dhupia. The movie has nothing but skin". Anupama Chopra wrote in India Today, "Skin is not equal to script. Cleavage is not content. Smooching, petting, love-in-the-jacuzzi are not plot points".
