= Rakesh Deewana =

Indian television and film actor (c. 1969–2014)

- Born: c. 1969; Hathras, Uttar Pradesh, India
- Died: April 2014 (aged 44–45); Indore, Madhya Pradesh, India
- Occupation: Actor
- Known for: Yeh Rishta Kya Kehlata Hai

Rakesh Deewana (c. 1969 – 27 April 2014) was an Indian character actor from Hathras, Uttar Pradesh. He died on the morning of 27 April 2014 due to illness caused after undergoing bariatric surgery in Indore.

== Filmography ==
=== Films ===
- Ya Rab (2014)
- Hello Hum Lallann Bol Rahe Hain (2010)
- Baabarr as Nanha (2009)
- Manoranjan: The Entertainment (2006)

=== Television ===
- Ramayan as Kumbhkarna (2008)
- Yeh Rishta Kya Kehlata Hai as Maharaj (2009–2014)
- Taarak Mehta Ka Ooltah Chashmah as Gajraj Hathi (2008 -2014)
- Devon Ke Dev...Mahadev as Kuber (2013)
