= Dhuan =

- Theatrical release poster
- Directed by: Dulal Guha
- Written by: Shafiq Ansari (dialogues); Majrooh Sultanpuri (lyrics)
- Screenplay by: Dulal Guha
- Produced by: Gautham Guha
- Starring: Mithun Chakraborty; Ranjeeta; Raakhee; Amjad Khan; Jeetendra (Gesture)
- Cinematography: M. Rajaram
- Edited by: Bimal Roy
- Music by: R. D. Burman
- Production company: Sri Sai Chitra
- Distributed by: Trimurti Films Pvt Ltd
- Release date: 27 March 1981
- Running time: 153 mins
- Country: India
- Language: Hindi

Dhuan (Hindi: Smoke) is a 1981 Hindi-language thriller film, produced by Gautham Guha under the Sri Sai Chitra banner and directed by Dulal Guha. It stars Mithun Chakraborty, Ranjeeta, Raakhee, Amjad Khan and Jeetendra in a guest appearance and music composed by R. D. Burman. It is a remake of the 1963 Bengali film Sesh Anka, which itself is an adaptation of English-language film Chase a Crooked Shadow (1958) and remade in Telugu as Mayadari Maridi (1985). The same plot was later used in the 1989 film Khoj starring Rishi Kapoor and Kimi Katkar.

== Plot ==
In order to usurp the wealth of Rani Gayatri Saxena, widowed owner of the Devigarh estate, Sunil Verma – a daredevil gangster - is appointed by his boss to purport as her brother-in-law Ashok Saxena, who died 3 years prior in Manila. Amongst this wealth are some important documents, unregistered jewelry, and solid gold statues. Using some cunning and acquiring the help of replacement staff also sent by his boss, Sunil succeeds in forging the pieces of evidence to make it look like he is Ashok. Gayatri tries to prove him as a fake, but is repeatedly foiled in these attempts. Eventually, she calls Sheela, ex-fiancée of Ashok; however, Sheela surprises her by also welcoming Sunil as Ashok. Sheela is unable to tell Gayatri that this is because the bad guys have kidnapped her father and threatened to harm him should she not comply, and she is not able to get any individual time with Gayatri to admit this. Gayatri continues to try to prove this, but Sunil remains one step ahead of her through multiple attempts. Eventually, Sunil claims she is mentally deranged and takes her to an asylum to have her tested and admitted. Ultimately, to avoid undergoing shock therapy, Gayatri declares that Sunil cannot be Ashok because she herself killed Ashok 3 years ago. On the heels of this admission, it is revealed that Sunil is a CBI officer and his boss, Dinesh Dikshit, is the IG of the secret service. The documents are eventually retrieved and Gayatri is apprehended. The movie ends with Sunil and Sheela going off together.

== Cast ==
- Raakhee as Rani Gayatri Saxena
- Mithun Chakraborty as Sunil Verma
- Ranjeeta as Sheela
- Amjad Khan as I.G. Dinesh Dikshit
- Aruna Irani as Pushpa
- Padma Khanna as Sundari
- Lakshmi as Laxmi
- Jeetendra as Ashok Saxena (Guest Appearance)
- Abhi Bhattacharya as Sheela's Father
- Goga Kapoor as Police Commissioner
- Raj Kiran as Himself
- Sudhir Pandey as Inspector Pandey at Devigarh Police Station
- Asit Sen as Hari Singh Hawaldaar at Devigarh Police Station

== Soundtrack ==
Lyrics: Majrooh Sultanpuri

Song	Singer
"Tera Aasra Hai"	Lata Mangeshkar
"Yeh Hai Mauka"	Asha Bhosle
"Phir Aankh Phadki"	Asha Bhosle
"Hum Bhi To Hai"	Amit Kumar
"Tum Mile Toh Hum Khile"	Amit Kumar, Suresh Wadkar

== Reception ==
A contemporary review found the film interesting and underscored the capacity of Rakhee to play a murderess. Another review, in Democratic World, praised the finale.
