= Rahul Banerjee (actor) =

Indian film actor (1983–2026)

- রাহুল অরুণোদয় বন্দ্যোপাধ্যায়
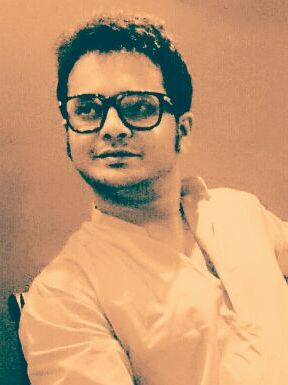
- Banerjee in 2014
- Pronunciation: [ɾaɦul ˈoɾunod̪ɔe̯ ˈbɔnd̪opad̪ʱːae̯]
- Born: Arunoday Banerjee; 16 October 1983; Calcutta, West Bengal, India
- Died: 29 March 2026 (aged 42); Talsari, Odisha, India
- Resting place: Keoratola crematorium
- Other name: Babin
- Education: Asutosh College
- Occupations: Actor; writer
- Years active: 1987–2026
- Works: Filmography; bibliography
- Spouse: Priyanka Sarkar (m. 2010)
- Children: 1
- Father: Biswanath Banerjee
- Awards: Anandalok Best Actor Award (2008)
- Writing career
- Pen name: Arunoday
- Language: Bengali
- Period: Modern
- Genres: Fiction; non-fiction
- Notable works: Lekhapattar; Colony Kallolini; Kolkata Cacophony; Jaler Bioscope

Rahul Arunoday Banerjee (Note: Bengali: রাহুল অরুণোদয় বন্দ্যোপাধ্যায়, Bengali pronunciation: [ɾaɦul ˈoɾunod̪ɔe̯ ˈbɔnd̪opad̪ʱːae̯].) (Bengali: রাহুল অরুণোদয় বন্দ্যোপাধ্যায়, pronounced [ɾaɦul ˈoɾunod̪ɔe̯ ˈbɔnd̪opad̪ʱːae̯]; 16 October 1983 – 29 March 2026), better known as Rahul Banerjee, was an Indian actor and writer. He primarily worked in Bengali films and television series. He made his first stage appearance at the age of three in Raj Darshan, a production staged by his father Biswanath Banerjee's theatre group, Bijoygarh Atmaprakash. He later went on to perform in nearly 450 stage productions, working with both his father's troupe and Theatron.

Banerjee was married to actress Priyanka Sarkar. He was catapulted to stardom for his role opposite her in Chirodini Tumi Je Amar (2008), directed by Raj Chakraborty. The film became a major box-office success and established him as a popular leading actor. He subsequently appeared in films such as Love Circus (2010) and Shono Mon Boli Tomay (2010). He made his television debut with the drama series Tumi Asbe Bole. Over the course of his career, he received several accolades, including the Anandalok Best Actor Award in 2008.

== Career ==
Before coming into films and television Rahul did a number of theatre programmes. After doing it he opted for a career in television and got a breakthrough after appearing in a famous show on Zee Bangla titled Khela in the role of Aditya. Beyond acting, Rahul was celebrated for his intellect, which found voice in his widely followed podcast Sohoj Kotha. He had also acted in the Bengali stage play Je Janlagulor Akash Chilo, which was adapted from stories written by him.

== Early life and education ==
Banerjee was born in Calcutta, West Bengal, India on 16 October 1983, to a family of theatre artists. His father, Biswanath Banerjee was a director of a theatre troupe named Bijoygor Atmaprakash. Banerjee attended Naktala High School and graduated from Ashutosh College.

== Personal life ==
After having a long relationship with his co-actor Priyanka Sarkar, the couple got married. They had one son. The couple separated in 2017 but re-united in 2023.

== Death ==
Banerjee died after falling into the sea while filming for his ongoing television show Bhole Baba Paar Karega in Talsari, on 29 March 2026, at the age of 42, according to local media reports. He was later declared dead upon reaching hospital. Postmortem examination revealed salt water and sand in lungs, indicating antemortem drowning. He was cremated the next day in Keoratola Crematorium, Kolkata.

== Filmography ==
Year	Title	Role	Notes
1995	Prabal Ronger Alo		Telefilm
2000	Chaka	Phatik	
2004	Aabar Aashbo Phire	Satya	
2008	Chirodini Tumi Je Amar	Krishna	
2009	Jackpot	Dodo Karmakar	
2009	Keno Kichu Kotha Bolo Na	Somnath aka Somu	
2009	Bhalobasa Jindabad	Raj	
2009	Ankash Talaash		
2009	Paran Jai Jaliya Re	Vivek Chatterjee	Cameo
2010	Love Circus	Subhadeep	
2010	Shono Mon Boli Tomay	Deep	
2010	Run		
2010	Hangover	As himself	Guest appearance
2010	Scream		
2010	Pratidwandi	Dibyendu Chatteejee aka Debu (Akash)	
2010	Get2gether	Rick Mukherjee	
2010	Jiyo Kaka		
2011	Moubone Aaj		
2011	Bor Bou Khela	Manas Jiban Mukhopadhyay	
2011	Kagojer Bou	Upal	
2011	Bhalobasha Off Route-e		
2011	Hero		
2011	Ajob Prem Abong		
2011	Katakuti		
2012	Balukabela.com		
2012	Na Hanyate		
2012	Goray Gondogol	Rick	
2013	Hoi Choi	Aban	
2013	Meghe Dhaka Tara	Anil Chatterjee	
2013	A Political Murder		
2013	Bedroom	Joy	
2013	Rupkatha Noy	Biswanath	
2014	Obhishopto Nighty	Boishakh	
2014	Jaatishwar	Amitava	Guest Appearance
2014	Take One		
2014	Aamar Aami	Anirban	
2014	Chotushkon	Amitava/Young Sakya	
2014	Pati Parameshwar	Amal	
2014	Byomkesh Phire Elo	Sanat	
2015	Ebar Shabor	Samiran Bagchi	Baes on the story "Rwin" by Shirshendu Mukhopadhyay
2015	Otai Last MMS		
2015	Tadanto		
2016	Khawto	Alokesh	
2016	Mr. Bhaduri		
2016	Zulfiqar	Laltu Das	
2017	Jawker Dhan	Kumar Ray	Based on the first Bimal-Kumar story by Hemendra Kumar Roy
2018	Biday Byomkesh	Ajit Bandopadhyaya	
2018	Byomkesh Gotro	Ajit Bandopadhyaya	
2019	Jadu Kadai		
2019	Rajlokkhi o Shrikanto		
2021	Sleelatahanir Pore	Sanglap	
2021	Sohorer Upokotha		
2021	Chabiwala: The Keysmith	Bhukharam	Independent film
2022	Mrittyupothojatri		
2022	Sohobase		
2022	Akash Ongsoto Meghla		
2022	Abar Kanchanjungha	Debesh	
2023	Kolkata'96		
2025	The Academy of Fine Arts	Rakhal Pakrashi	
2025	Rappa Roy & Full Stop Dot Com		Based on the Rappa Roy Bengali comics series by Sujog Bandyopadhyay
2026	Chobiwala	Vishwakarma	

== Web series ==
Year	Web series	Director	Platform	Notes	Ref.
2017	Adorshini	Rahul Sapui	Addatimes		
2018	Action Area 11B	Abhiroop Basu	Addatimes		
2018	Kaali Season 1		ZEE5		
2019–21	Paap	Anupam Hari & Joydeep Mukherjee	Hoichoi		
2020	Kaali Season 2		ZEE5		
2022	Feludar Goyendagiri	Srijit Mukherji	Hoichoi		
2023	Indubala Bhater Hotel	Debaloy Bhattacharya	Hoichoi		
2023	Seven	Anjan Dutt	ZEE5		
2025	Puropuri Eken	Joydeep Mukherjee	Hoichoi		
2026	Thakumar Jhuli	Ayan Chakrabarty	Hoichoi		

== Television serials ==
- Khela (2006–2008) as Aditya Barman, (later replaced by Debanjan Chatterjee) Zee Bangla
- Mohona (2008) as Arka, Zee Bangla
- Tumi Ashbe Bole (2014–2016) as Rahul Debroy, Star Jalsha
- Swapno Udaan (2017) as Roopayan Sen aka Roop, Star Jalsha
- Ardhangini (2018) as Umapati "Uma" Bhattacharya, Star Jalsha
- Aye Khuku Aye (2019–2020) as Rahul, Sun Bangla
- Desher Maati (2021) as Dr. Rajrup Banerjee aka Raja, Star Jalsha
- Laalkuthi (2022) as Bikram Dastidar, Zee Bangla
- Horogouri Pice Hotel (2022–2025) as Prabhakar Ghosh, Star Jalsha
- Geeta LL.B (2025) as Bishnudev Chatterjee, Star Jalsha
- Bholebaba Paar Karega (2026) as Dr. Ujaan Chatterjee, Star Jalsha

== Bibliography ==
Title	Bengali title	Year	Publisher	ISBN	Ref.
Rahuler Scrapbook	রাহুলের স্ক্র্যাপবুক	2020	Saptarshi Prakashan	ISBN 978-973-9382-70-0	
Lekhapattar	লেখাপত্তর	2022	Saptarshi Prakashan	ISBN 978-939-08305-8-9	
Colony Kallolini	কলোনি কল্লোলিনী	2023	Dey's Publishing		
Kolkata Cacophony	কলকাতা ক্যাকোফোনি	2024	Dey's Publishing		
Jaler Bioscope	জলের বায়োস্কোপ	2024	Dey's Publishing		
Shreshthanshe Rahul	শ্রেষ্ঠাংশে রাহুল	2025	Saptarshi Prakashan		
Sahaj Katha	সহজ কথা	2026	Khoai Publishing House		

== Awards and nominations ==
Year	Award	Category	Nominated work	Awarded by	Result	Ref.
2008	Anandalok Puraskar	Best Actor	Chirodini Tumi Je Amar	Anandabazar Patrika	Won	
