= Ustad Rajkumar Rizvi =

Indian Ghazal Singer

Ustad Rajkumar Rizvi was an Award-winning Indian Ghazal Singer and Performer, He was the nephew and one of the first disciple of Ustad Mehdi Hassan. Song laila Majnu Do Badan Ek Jaan The from the movie Laila Majnu (1976 film) was among some of his well acclaimed work. He was the spouse of Indrani Mukherjee (singer).
