= Bhayaanak =

- DVD Cover
- Directed by: S. U. Syed
- Written by: Meeraq Mirza
- Produced by: A. V. Mohan
- Starring: Mithun Chakraborty; Ranjeeta
- Cinematography: Venkatesh
- Music by: Usha Khanna; Lyrics: Indivar
- Release date: 1979
- Running time: 125 minutes
- Language: Hindi

Bhayaanak is a Hindi-language action-horror film released in 1979, directed by S U Syed. Mithun Chakraborty, Ranjeeta and Chandrashekhar played the lead roles in the film.

== Plot ==
The story begins with a beautiful woman being manhandled by some goons outside a local cemetery. The goons are interrupted by a Police inspector Vijay (played by Mithun). Since Vijay is not in his police uniform, the goons take him for a nerd and try to scare him away from the scene. Mithun beats them up and saves the girl. The girl has no relatives and is new in the town. Vijay and Renu come along on the same note and begin dating each other. Soon they decide to get married and settle down. It's not very long when Vijay is transferred to another town (Mangalpur). Promising his newly wed wife a quick reunion at Mangalpur, Mithun leaves for his destination. A few days later, Renu receives a telegram from Mangalpur. Vijay has asked her to come to Mangalpur all by herself. Renu takes a bold decision of going to Mangalpur. Upon her arrival, she finds that Mangalpur is a desolate town with strange people. She decides to continue her further journey by foot, but ends up at a large wilderness where a strange tanga is waiting for her. Bewildered by the reigning silence of the wilderness, Renu decides to board the tanga, but goes helpless when the tanga takes her to a creepy grove, where she is murdered. When Vijay learns of her arrival and later death, he decides to investigate the matter. Renu's corpse is devoid of blood and this looks strange to Vijay. With permission from his superiors, Vijay begins to look for the clues. His investigation ultimately leads him to the deranged family of Thakur, who with his brothers lives a secretive life. They say that those who try to sneak into his Haveli are never seen again. Whenever Thakur or his family members are out on the streets, they are barked at and chased by the street dogs. Something is seriously different about this family that happens to have a plan of exploiting their victims for a common, but highly sinister cause. They are vampires thriving on human blood.

== Cast ==
- Mithun Chakraborty as Inspector Vijay
- Ranjeeta as Renu
- Sadhu Meher as Sidhu
- Nilu Phule as Bade Thakur
- Sharat Saxena as Mangu
- Om Shivpuri as Rajguru
- Chandrashekhar as DCP
- Jagdish Raj as Sadhu Singh
- Reena Roy as Champa (special appearance)
- Madan Joshi as Railway Master Khan Saab
- Ravi Kumar as Raja
- Razia Sultana as Rani
- Ranjan Grewal as Thakur Surya Pratap Singh
- Mushtaq Merchant

== Soundtrack ==
#	Song	Singer	Raga
1	"Dhuan Sa Utha Dekho"	Suresh Wadkar	
2	"Saiyan Mein Aaye Sab Chor"	Suresh Wadkar, Hemlata	
3	"Bheega Bheega Mausam Aaya"	Hemlata	Shivaranjani
4	"Ada Hi Ada Kharidenge"	Anuradha Paudwal	
