= Aadat Se Majboor (film) =

1982 Indian Hindi film

- Poster
- Directed by: Ambrish Sangal
- Written by: Apurba Kishore Bir
- Produced by: Mohan Kumar
- Starring: Mithun Chakraborty; Ranjeeta; Rameshwari; Neena Gupta; Mohan Gokhale
- Cinematography: K. K. Mahajan
- Edited by: Pratap Bhatt
- Music by: Usha Khanna
- Release date: 2 July 1982
- Running time: 105 minutes
- Country: India
- Language: Hindi

Adat Se Majboor (lit. 'Helpless by Habit') is a 1982 Indian Hindi-language film directed by Ambrish Sangal, starring Mithun Chakraborty, Mohan Gokhale, Neena Gupta, Gloria Mahanty, Bijainee Misra and Lalatendu Rath.

== Cast ==
- Mithun Chakraborty - Shankar Shastri
- Ranjeeta - Neetu Verma
- Rameshwari - Salma / Shanti
- Madan Puri - Dinanath Shastri
- Amrish Puri - Joginder Singh / Agnihotri
- Om Shivpuri - Dr. Verma
- Sudha Shivpuri - Mrs. Verma
- Mohan Choti - Ramu
- Padmini Kapila - Madam Zorro
- C.S. Dubey - Dheeru Bhai
- Moolchand - Bachchu Bhai
- Master Fareed - Young Shankar
- Baby Priya - Young Neetu
- Pappu - Young Ramu
- Dulari - Nadira Shaikh
- Ranvir Raj - Agnihotri's Manager

== Soundtrack ==
The film has 6 songs, written by Indivar & Nida Fazli and composed by Usha Khanna.

1. "Ram Kare Ke Umar Qaid (Female)" – Lata Mangeshkar
2. "Ya Rehmat-E-Alam" – Lata Mangeshkar
3. "Ram Kare Ke Umar Qaid Hame (Male)" – Shailendra Singh
4. "Aankh Dil Ki Zubaan Hoti Hai" – Usha Mangeshkar, Mahendra Kapoor, Shabbir Kumar
5. "Tera Pyar Mila" – Asha Bhosle
6. "Andar Ki Baat Hai" – Shailendra Singh
