= Keoratola crematorium =

Indian funeral facility

- কেওড়াতলা মহাশ্মশান (Bengali)
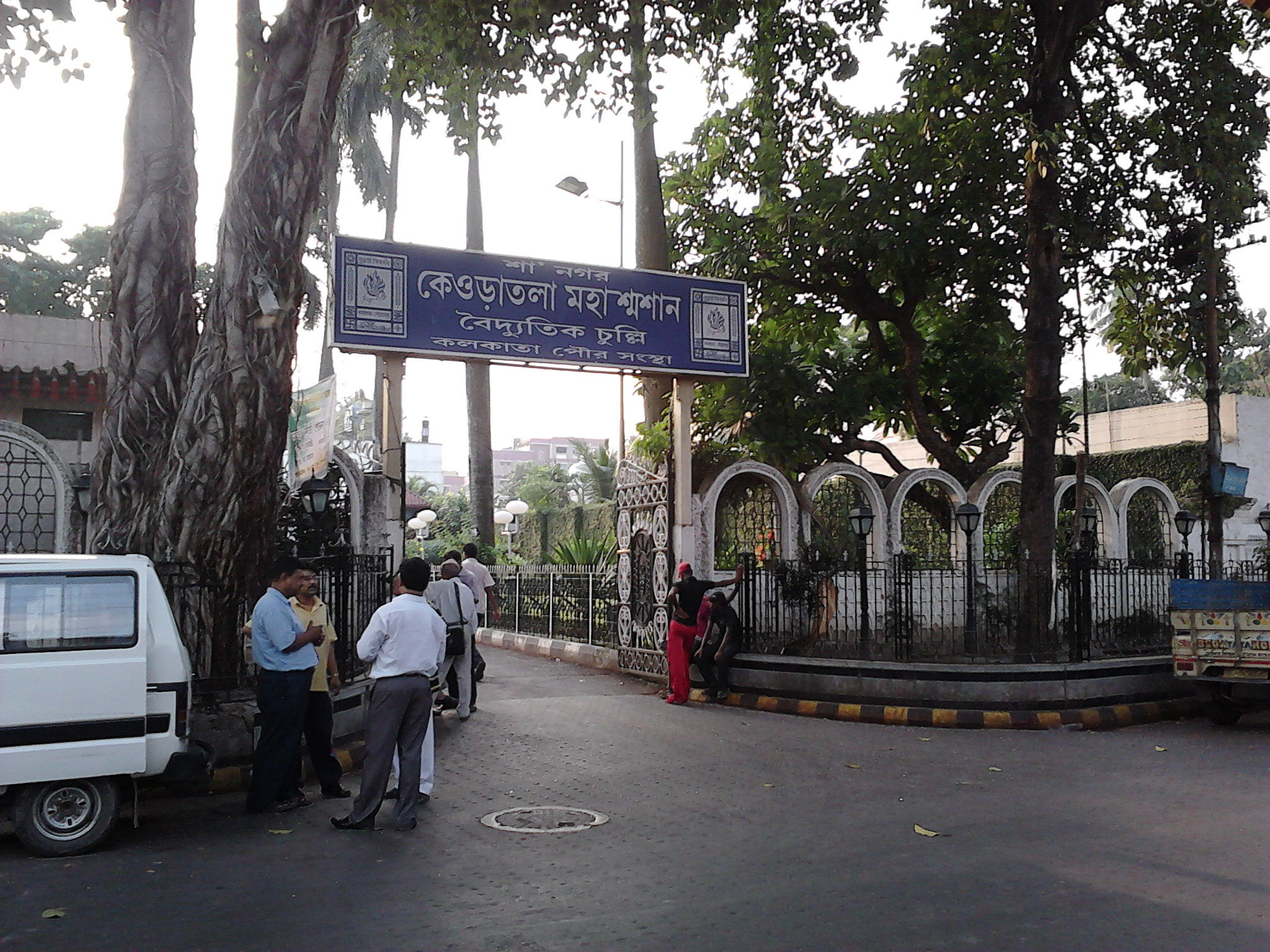
- Entrance of Keoratola crematorium
- Location: 113, Tollygunge Road, Sahanagar, Kalighat, Kolkata-700026

Keoratola crematorium or Keoratola Burning Ghat or Shahnagar Keoratola crematorium is a crematory located at Tollygunge Road, Kalighat, Kolkata. This is one of the largest cremation grounds in Kolkata.

== History ==
Before the establishment of this crematorium, there was a jungle of Caraway trees and the area was named as Keoratala. This crematorium was established in 1862 beside the bank of the Adi Ganga. Keoratala crematorium was modernised by Dr. Bidhan Chandra Roy, Ex-Chief minister of West Bengal. There is a park besides it with number of tombs and memorials.

== Notable funerals ==
- Birendranath Sasmal
- Charu Majumdar
- Chittaranjan Das
- Bagha Jatin
- Hare Krishna Konar
- Jibanananda Das
- Meghnad Saha
- Satyajit Ray
- Shanu Lahiri
- Shyama Prasad Mookerjee
- Soumitra Chatterjee
- Subhas Chakraborty
- Subrata Mukherjee
- Suchitra Sen
- Sunil Gangopadhyay
- Uttam Kumar
- Rahul Arunoday Banerjee

== See also ==
- Nimtala crematorium
