= Zindagi Tere Naam =

- Promotional Poster of Zindagi Tere Naam
- Directed by: Ashu Trikha
- Written by: Sanjay Masoom
- Produced by: Pawan Goyal
- Starring: Mithun Chakraborty; Ranjeeta; Dalip Tahil; Goldy; Ashish Sharma; Supriya Karnik
- Cinematography: Suhass Gujarathi
- Music by: Sajid–Wajid
- Release date: 16 March 2012
- Running time: 137 minutes
- Language: Hindi

Zindagi Tere Naam (transl. Life, your name) is a 2012 Indian Hindi-language romance film directed by Ashu Trikha, starring Mithun Chakraborty and Ranjeeta. The film was completed in 2008, but released only in 2012 with limited prints. The film is based on the American Nicholas Sparks' novel The Notebook and the 2004 film with the same name.

== Plot ==
The film starts with an old man, Mr. Singh, narrating a story to an old woman as her memory is slipping day by day. Mr. Singh tells about young lovers Siddharth and Anjali. Anjali is a rich girl, but Siddharth is a poor man's son. Anjali's father disapproves of this affair and takes the daughter away. Dejected, Siddharth starts writing letters to her. He writes 365 letters in that entire year, but never hears from Anjali. She believes that he has forgotten her. Years pass and Anjali cannot find Siddharth, so she eventually plans to settle down with another man. Destiny, however, has other plans and the two lovers meet again. As the flashback ends, the film goes back to the elder couple. The old woman realizes that Mr. Singh was telling their own love story, and her memories of the past come rushing back. Mr. Singh is briefly happy, but his wife's memory leaves again. Siddharth holds onto hope, though, that if Anjali can remember him for a moment once, then she'll remember again.

== Cast ==
- Mithun Chakraborty as Siddharth Singh
- Ashish Sharma as Vishal
- Ranjeeta Kaur as Mrs. Anjali Singh
- Aseem Ali Khan as Young Siddharth Singh
- Priyanka Mehta as Young Anjali
- Dalip Tahil as Anjali's father
- Supriya Karnik as Anjali's mother
- Sharat Saxena as Siddharth's father
- Himani Shivpuri as Nurse
- Yatin Karyekar as Doctor
- Dia Mirza as Item Number
- Sajid in a special appearance

== Soundtrack ==
Zindagi Tere Naam

Soundtrack album by Sajid–Wajid
- Released: 13 June 2008
- Genre: Film soundtrack
- Length: 40:38
- Label: Venus Records & Tapes Pvt. Ltd.

As the movie was completed in 2008, the music of the movie was released on 13 June 2008. Soon before the release of movie in 2012, the most anticipated track of the movie was "Tu Mujhe Soch Kabhi" by KK.

Track listing
No.	Title	Singer(s)	Length
1.	"Milne Ko Nahi Aaye" (Duet)	Sunidhi Chauhan, Shaan	4:57
2.	"Trishna Trishna Dil"	Shafqat Amanat Ali Khan, Sunidhi Chauhan	5:13
3.	"Milne Ko Nahi Aaye" (Male)	Shaan	4:58
4.	"Ajnabee Sa Lagta Hai"	Sunidhi Chauhan, Wajid Khan	5:20
5.	"Kya Khata Ho Gayee"	Afzal Sabri, Richa Sharma	5:35
6.	"Milne Ko Nahi Aaye" (Female)	Sunidhi Chauhan	4:58
7.	"Tauba Tauba"	Sunidhi Chauhan, Wajid Khan	5:17
8.	"Tu Mujhe Soch Kabhi"	KK	4:28
Total length:			40:38
