= Ustadi Ustad Se =

- Promotional poster
- Directed by: Deepak Bahry
- Written by: Khalid Siddiqui; Narvi
- Produced by: Gautam Bhatia; Mohan T Gehani
- Starring: Mithun Chakraborty; Vinod Mehra; Ranjeeta
- Music by: Raamlaxman
- Release date: 26 February 1982
- Running time: 125 minutes
- Country: India
- Language: Hindi

Ustadi Ustad Se is a 1982 Indian Hindi-language film directed by Deepak Bahry, starring Mithun Chakraborty, Vinod Mehra, Ranjeeta in lead roles.

== Summary ==
Young Seema (Sweety) with her grandfather and maternal uncle Kaamdev lives a middle-classed lifestyle. As a child, Raju (Rajesh) is her best friend and Sonu (Sanjay) also wants to be her friend, but she hates him. One day a stormy hurricane occurs and the entire city is destroyed. All three friends get separated from each other.

== Cast ==
- Mithun Chakraborty as Rajesh "Raju"
- Vinod Mehra as Sanjay "Sonu"
- Ranjeeta as Seema "Sweety"
- Prema Narayan as Prema
- Bharat Kapoor as Prem
- Padma Khanna as Kara
- Jagdeep as Kaamdev
- Madhu Malhotra as Sheeba
- Trilok Kapoor as Police Inspector
- Master Bhagwan as Qawwali Dancer
- Yunus Parvez as Goon
- M. B. Shetty as Prem's Henchman
- Bob Christo as Prem's Henchman
- Jayshree T. as Jayshree (Bollywood Actress)
- Birbal as Namdev (Kamdev's Nephew)
- Ratnamala as Sanjay's Mother
- Master Bittoo as Young Sanjay
- Master Sonu Nigam as Young Rajesh
- Gazala as Young Seema
- Mumtaz Begum as Poor woman who is assisted by Rajesh

== Music ==
| Song | Singer |
|---|---|
| "Saathi Tere Naam"-1 | Asha Bhosle, Usha Mangeshkar |
| "Saathi Tere Naam"-2 | Asha Bhosle, Bhupinder Singh |
| "Tumsa Nahin Mila" | Asha Bhosle, Amit Kumar |
| "Rehmatullah Mashallah" | Asha Bhosle, Mohammed Rafi |
| "Ustadi Ustad Se" | Asha Bhosle, Mohammed Rafi, Manna Dey |
| "Walion Mein Wali Mukhdoom" | Mahendra Kapoor, Amit Kumar, Aziz Nazan |
