= Laila Majnu (1976 film) =

- Film poster
- Directed by: Harnam Singh Rawail
- Written by: Abrar Alvi; Anjana Rawail; Harnam Singh Rawail
- Produced by: Ram B.C. Seeroo Daryani
- Starring: Rishi Kapoor; Ranjeeta Kaur; Danny Dengzongpa
- Cinematography: G. Singh
- Edited by: Shyam Rajput
- Music by: Madan Mohan; Jaidev
- Distributed by: De Luxe Films
- Release dates: 19 November 1976 (Delhi-U.P.); 26 November 1976 (Bombay)
- Running time: 141 min.
- Countries: India; West Germany; Soviet Union
- Language: Hindustani

Laila Majnu is a 1976 Indian Hindustani-language romantic drama film directed by Harnam Singh Rawail and starring Rishi Kapoor, Ranjeeta and Danny Denzongpa in lead roles. The film's music is by Madan Mohan and Jaidev. Based on the legend of Layla and Majnun, it tells the story of two star-crossed lovers: Laila, a princess and Qais a.k.a. Majnu, a common man.

Laila Majnu marked the debut of Ranjeeta. Upon its release in 1976, it garnered highly positive reviews from film critics, and became a box-office success. The humongous success of the film cemented Rishi Kapoor's status as a bankable star; for after his debut in Bobby (1973), he did not have any major success before Laila Majnu, with the exception of Kabhi Kabhie (1976). However, the success of that film was credited towards Shashi Kapoor and Amitabh Bachchan. Since its release in 1976, Laila Majnu is hailed as a cult classic.

== Plot ==
Laila and her lover Majnu, better known as Qais, were born to rival clans, the Amaris and the Sharwaris. The two loved each other as children. Their love was such that if one was hurt, the other started bleeding. The film recounts, how as kids at the madarsa, the maulvi asks them to write the name of Allah on their slates. Qais, who is lost in thoughts of Laila, inscribes her name instead. In return, an incensed maulvi canes him on the hand. But it is Laila's hand which starts bleeding. Incidents such as this, spread like wild fire and Laila's father, scared for his daughter's reputation, decides to stop her from going to school. The two clan heads decide to separate their children as it is impossible for them to conceive of the Sharwaris and the Amaris ever being joined by love instead of blood. Laila and her Majnu grow up in different places.

Many years later, Qais and his friends visit Laila's town to buy camels and the stage is set for the two lovers to meet again. One day at the marketplace, they encounter each other and it is love at first sight for both of them. They start meeting each other secretly, all over again. But the villain makes his entry in the form of Laila's hot-tempered brother Tabrez (Ranjeet). He has already had a spat with Qais, with neither knowing the other's true identity. In the turn of events that follow, Qais's father dies at the hands of Tabrez. Qais in turn, avenges his father's murder by killing Tabrez. He is exiled from the town and wanders about in the dunes, like a madman, thirsting for just a look of his beloved. Meanwhile, Laila is married off to a prince, Bakhsh (Danny). Learning of her love for Qais, he promises to keep his distance until such time that he is not able to replace Majnu in Laila's heart. Like all others before him, he is unable to understand the almost divinely ordained love of Laila and Majnu. When he does, it is too late.

== Cast ==
The cast of the film has been listed below:

- Rishi Kapoor as Majnu / Qais Al Amri
- Ranjeeta Kaur as Laila
- Danny Dengzongpa as Prince Bahksh
- Iftekhar as Emir Sharwari (Laila's father)
- Mumtaz Begum as Laila's grandmother
- Achala Sachdeva as Laila's mother
- Aruna Irani as Zarina
- Preeti Ganguli as Gulbadan
- Govardhan Asrani as Kamraj
- Kanwarjit Paintal as Jafran
- Raza Murad as Mastan
- Sunder as Inspector with the sword
- Ranjeet Bedi as Tabrez
- Kamal Kapoor as Amari

== Soundtrack ==
The film’s music was composed by Madan Mohan and Jaidev with lyrics by Sahir Ludhianvi. Madan Mohan died a year before the film was released during production, with Jaidev replacing him.

Mohammed Rafi sang all the songs for Rishi Kapoor. Lata Mangeshkar provided vocals for Ranjeeta.

Song	Singer (s)	Raga
"Husn Hazir Hai"	Lata Mangeshkar	
"Tere Dar Pa Aaya Hoon"	Mohammed Rafi	Darbari Kanada
"Hoke Mayoos Tere Dar Se"	Mohammed Rafi, Aziz Nazan, Shankar Shambbhu, Ambar Kumar and Chorus	
"Is Reshmi Paazzeb Ki Jhankar"	Mohammed Rafi, Lata Mangeshkar	
"Barbad-E-Mohabbat ki Dua"	Mohammed Rafi	Alhaiya Bilaval
"Ab Agar Hum Se Khudai Bhi"	Mohammed Rafi, Lata Mangeshkar	
"Yeh Deewane Ki Zidd Hai Apne"	Mohammed Rafi	
"Likh Kar Tera Naam Zameen Par"	Mohammed Rafi, Lata Mangeshkar	Alhaiya Bilaval
"Laila Majnu Do Badan Ek Jaan The"	Ustad Rajkumar Rizvi, Anuradha Paudwal, Preeti Sagar	
"Koi Patthar Se Na Maare Mere Deewane Ko"	Lata Mangeshkar	

The songs of the movie were hits. Especially "Is Reshmi Paazzeb Ki Jhankar", "Tere Dar Par Aaya Hoon", "Husn Hazir Hai", "Koi Patthar Se Na Maare. "Husn Hazir Hai" reached number one on the Binaca Geetmala annual list 1977, a rarity for a Madan Mohan composed song.

== Release and reception ==
Laila Majnu (1976) received widespread acclaim for its poignant portrayal of timeless love and sacrifice. The performances of the lead actors, particularly Ranjeeta Kaur as Laila, were widely praised for their emotional depth, capturing the essence of tragic love. The film’s success not only solidified its place in Hindi cinema but also reinforced the enduring appeal of the Laila Majnu legend. This story has been adapted multiple times in Bollywood, with various filmmakers drawing from the classic tale of unrequited love, highlighting its timeless relevance and influence on the industry.

== Box office ==
The film was a major success in the box office and critically acclaimed. But it was ignored by National film award & Filmfare award as it is not even nominated in any categories.

Laila Majnu with an estimated budget of ₹1.70 crore, achieved remarkable box office success, emerging as a blockbuster despite a modest opening. The film's Day 1 collection was ₹0.06 crore, and it experienced a steady increase over the first weekend, earning ₹0.18 crore. By the end of its first week, the film had grossed ₹0.38 crore in India. Its lifetime net collection in India reached ₹4.25 crore, with a total gross collection of ₹8.50 crore.

== See also ==
- Yusuf and Zulaikha
- Shirin and Farhad
- Heer Ranjha
