= Baabarr =

Baabaarrr
- Directed by: Ashu Trikha
- Written by: Ikram Akhtar
- Produced by: Sunil Saini; Mukesh Shah
- Starring: Sohum Shah; Mithun Chakraborty; Urvashi Sharma; Mukesh Tiwari; Govind Namdeo; Om Puri
- Cinematography: Suhass Gujarathi
- Music by: Anand Raj Anand
- Distributed by: Ridhi Sidhi Films
- Release date: 11 September 2009
- Country: India
- Language: Hindi

Baabarr is a 2009 gangster Hindi film directed by Ashu Trikha. The film stars Sohum Shah, Mithun Chakraborty and Urvashi Sharma.

== Plot ==
Crime in Uttar Pradesh is increasing. A small town named Amanganj mostly having mohammedan popularity is getting notorious day by day. From childhood Baabarr rises up as the most wanted gangster of the area. Baabarr's elder brothers also helped him in his path. When SP Mrittyunjay was sent to dominate the crime in the city SP faced strong resilience from Baabarr and his men first and then from the corrupt policemen, politicians etc. Baabarr goes mad after a businessman for bidding and getting a tender. Baabarr got mad and tries to kill him and Tabrez helped to protect the businessman from Baabarr. Police came to the scene and everybody ran away and the businessman getting some help from Tabrez, Baabarr's archrival, went to Bhaiyaaji a powerful MP to take shelter. Baabarr threatens and challenged Bhaiyaaji and he entered bhaiyaaji's daughters' marriage ceremony and shots down the businessman. Upon chased by security and other men Nawaaz and Baabarr fires bullets and tries to escape from the situation which got worsened. Baabarr was caught and then he surrendered and finally he was sent to jail. On his mother's request he weds to a girl of her choice. Meanwhile Tabrez plots to kill Baabarr and fires a bullet in front of policemen and all other people present outside a court scene but he survived a close bullet shot. He then gets a bail from the court. Baabarr's elder brother Nawaaz got mad at Tabrez and started killing Tabrez's men mercilessly. After getting a tip from inspector Chaturvedi about Tabrez, Baabarr followed but realized that it was a setup by the SP to arrest him. Baabarr closely escaped the scene and later grasped Chaturvedi. Chaturvedi shifts the focus towards SP Mrittyunjay and got an easy escape from Baabarr. With day by day law and order of the city becoming more unstable. Ministers and politicians calls up SP to take action. SP Mrittyunjay intimidated inspector Chaturvedi to catch Baabarr. Chaturvedi and SP finally catches up Nawaaz with the help of Mamu but Baabarr went to a safehouse in Kolkata with his wife. When Baabarr came to know about Mamu's betrayal he went on to Mamu's place. Jia, Mamu's niece and Baabarr's love requested him not to kill Mamu but Baabarr kills Mamu. After realizing that he has been framed and plotted by the Ministers and the MPs Baabarr fires bullet to an MP and surrendered in Kolkata high court only to get his security increased by the Kolkata high court's order. The council of ministers, MPs, policemen sensed election is near got worried about Baabarr's activities and plans to kill Baabarr. SP Mrittyunjay was reluctant to go against Kolkata high court's order and plot against Baabarr's security but Chaturvedi advised a plan to bail out Tabrez and use him to kill Baabarr. Chaturvedi helps Tabrez to escape and reports to SP, Baabarr goes mad after listening this news and with the help of Chaturvedi he fires and shots down SP. Chaturvedi shots down Baabarr. Police started encounters in all the Amanganj area, kills Tabrez and his whole gang. One fine morning after this incident Chaturvedi heard a knock on his door and opens the door and was shot down by a kid firing bullets to his chest.

== Cast ==
- Sohum Shah as Baabarr Qureshi
- Mahesh Chandra Deva as Tabrez,s gang
- Rahil Haider as Child Babbarr Qureshi
- Urvashi Sharma as Ziya
- Mukesh Tiwari as Nawaz
- Govind Namdeo as Bhaiyaa Jee
- Om Puri as Daroga Awadh Narayan Chaturvedi
- Tinu Anand as Mamu
- Sushant Singh as Tabrez
- Kashish as Aafreen
- Shakti Kapoor as Sarfaraaz
- Rakesh Deewana as Nanha
- Mahesh Chandra Deva as Tabrez Group

== Music ==
1. "O Maula" - Anand Raj Anand
2. ""Maula Ye Bataa (unplugged) - Anand Raj Anand
3. Pagal Manwa" - Raka Mukherjee
4. "Baabarr" - Sukhwinder Singh
5. "Baaje Raat Ke Bara" - Sunidhi Chauhan

== Legal issues ==
A PIL was filed in the Bombay High Court seeking a ban on Baabarr for alleged negative portrayal of Muslims. The petitioner also charged that characters in the film were based on Mulayam Singh Yadav and Mayawati.

== Critical reception ==
Taran Adarsh of Bollywood Hungama gave 3.5 out of 5 stars. The Times of India gave 2.5 out of 5 stars & stated that "The film is not much impressive as expected, director Ashu Trikha & writer Ikram Akhtar did a well job but the thing making it unimpressive is that the director gets only the mood right, not the scenes, though the reviewer praised the performance of Om Puri by saying that it is Om Puri as the oily, wily and crooked cop, who steals the show". Martin D'Souza of Bollywood Trade News Network gave it 1 out of 5 stars & said by calling the film a repetition that "the film is of old story with new cast & crew, Martin specially criticises the decision of making film with lead role of Soham Shah"

== Box office ==
The film was not good at the box office as it hardly netted an amount of ₹10 million (US$120,000) at the end of its first week after release & getting through the cinemas across India Baabarr at last managed to gross ₹15.1 million (US$180,000) & determined a Flop.

Baabarr grossed £2,748 on 18 September 2009 & £1,439 on 11 September 2009 according to Bollywood hungama.
