= Film Studios Setting & Allied Mazdoor Union =

Trade union in India

FSSAMU
- Film Studios Setting & Allied Mazdoor Union
- Founded: 3 September 1983; 42 years ago
- Headquarters: B 413, 414 & 415, Express Zone Mall, Western Express Highway; Malad East, Mumbai - 400097
- Location: India
- Members: 46,000 (2020)
- Key people: Ram Kadam (President); Gangeshwar Lal Shrivastava (General Secretary)
- Affiliations: FWICE
- Website: FSSAMU
- As on 20 May 2020

Film Studios Setting & Allied Mazdoor Union (FSSAMU) is a film industry worker's trade union in Mumbai, India. Annual day celebration of FSSAMU will be held on the 26 January every year on occasion of Republic Day. Ashok Dubey is the current chairman of the union. Before that Ghatkopar, Mumbai MLA Ram Kadam was the chairman. Formerly this post was held by Mithun Chakraborty. Gangeshwar Lal Shrivastava is the current general secretary of the union along with Rakesh Maurya as treasurer.

"Film Studios Setting and Allied Mazdoor Union" was established in the year 1983, which was formed for all the workers who wanted to work in the production house and film industry. Today it is the largest trade union in Asia with more than 46,000 members. Changes have been made in this union from time to time, and today the strength of this union is that it can show its strength whenever and wherever it wants. From time to time, this union has been helping its members with financial assistance, insurance scheme, medical assistance and other types of assistance.

== Affiliations ==
FSSAMU is a member of FWICE, itself part of Federation of Western India Cine Employees.
