= Sun Sajna =

- Poster
- Directed by: Chander Bahl
- Produced by: Tarachand Barjatya
- Starring: Mithun Chakraborty; Ranjeeta Kaur; Iftekhar; Jagdeep; Ram Mohan
- Edited by: Mukhtar Ahmed
- Music by: Raam Laxman
- Release date: 1982
- Running time: 125 minutes
- Language: Hindi
- Budget: Rs 1.7 Crores

Sun Sajna is a 1982 Indian Hindi-language film directed by Chander Bahl for Rajshri Productions, starring Mithun Chakraborty, Ranjeeta Kaur, Iftekhar, Ram Mohan and Jagdeep.

== Plot ==
Basanti (Ranjeeta Kaur), a lively young woman, lives in Madhupur with her father and uncle. Basanti owns a little shop called "Basanti's Shop". Here she sells various types of merchandise, most popularly dolls, that her blind neighbour (who she looked up to as her grandfather) made. Her childhood friend, Gopi, also owns a shop close to hers. He is secretly in love with Basanti and wants to marry her, but Basanti does not have any interest in him, as her friend, Champa, is in love with him although he doesn't accept her love. One day, Basanti meets a singer named Raj Kumar (Mithun Chakraborty) at the hotel, "Tin Min". Raj Kumar instantly falls in love with Basanti and she does with him also, but she does not show it. Raj Kumar tries different ways into getting Basanti to admit she loves him and for him to get closer to her and her family, which involves him paying a gang of men to pretend to tease Basanti and then when he tries to save her, he'll beat them up, so Basanti's father and uncle would see Raj's bravery and how he wants to protect Basanti. Gopi, who sees Raj and Basanti were getting too close, pays the men more money than Raj was paying them to actually beat Raj. Basanti's father and uncle arrive and try to help Raj. Basanti's uncle cuts one of the men with a blade. The man vows vengeance and leaves. Basanti's family takes Raj home and makes him comfortable as he was hurt in the fight. Basanti and Raj have a little conversation where she tells him that she knows he paid the men. Soon enough, Basanti admits her love for Raj and the love birds spend some happy times until Gopi poisons Basanti's family against Raj. They tell Basanti she could never see Raj again, but they still meet on the sly and are caught. Raj says that he truly loves Basanti and he won't take advantage of her at all. Her family believes him and fixes his marriage with Basanti.

Gopi is shocked to find out this and tries other ways to get Basanti, but they don't work. Raj and Basanti would often go on the hill and dream of their married life together. But before the marriage could take place, Raj has to perform his show in Bombay and bring his mother to meet Basanti and for the wedding. Basanti and Raj do not want to be separated, even for a few days, but they patiently waited for the days to pass so they can marry. On the day when Raj and his mother were to return, they meet Basanti's uncle who offers them a ride back home. The man who also vowed his revenge is sitting on the side of the road when he sees Basanti's uncle and Raj. He drives a truck and knocks their car off the road.

After the accident, Raj's mother dies, Raj goes blind and Basanti's uncle receives some minor injuries. At home, Basanti and her father are busily preparing for the wedding. Basanti's uncle informs her father what happened and they came to a conclusion to not let Basanti and Raj marry as Raj's blindness would be a burden to Basanti. So they tell Basanti that Raj betrayed her and they tell Raj Basanti has married someone else. The two lead a painful life away from each other. After some time, Basanti's health starts deteriorating. Her friend Champa, (Madhu Malini) comes to stay with her, to help her family and helps Basanti manage her work in her sickness. Although Gopi always wanted Basanti, he did not like seeing her this way, as every day her condition was getting worse. He agrees to accept Champa, who was always in love with him, just for Basanti to get well. Gopi sets out to find Raj. He finds him singing in a hotel with a large crowd of girls around him. Gopi becomes furious to think Raj betrayed Basanti. He is about to give him a piece of his mind when he realises Raj is blind. Raj tells him the truth that was told to him, and Gopi said Basanti is not married, it is a lie, she is living a sick life, waiting for him. Raj is surprised to hear this and immediately goes with Gopi to meet Basanti. Basanti's condition gets in its worst stage and she does not have much more time. Raj and Gopi reach back, but he wears sunglasses as he doesn't want Basanti to know of his blindness. Basanti is happy to see Raj come back to her. They both hug and as Raj is about to put sindoor on her head although he does not know where he is putting his hand. Basanti, realising what is going on, guides his hand to her path on her head, where he puts it. Basanti's wish is fulfilled, and while hugging Raj, she dies in his arms. Everyone is completely shattered. Raj screams out her name, he also breathes his last. The film ends at this point.

== Cast ==
- Mithun Chakraborty as Raj Kumar
- Ranjeeta Kaur as Basanti
- Iftekhar as Karim
- Jagdeep as Balraj Kitoria
- Ram Mohan as Dayal Chacha
- Sheela David as Shanti

== Music ==
The soundtrack is on Rajshri Records Pvt. Ltd. Music compositions are provided by Raamlaxman and the songs are written by Ravindra Rawal.

#	Title	Singer(s)
1	"Sun Sajna" (Part I)	K. J. Yesudas, Anuradha Paudwal
2	"Kab Hua"	Bhupinder Singh
3	"Bichhua Ne Dank Maara"	Usha Mangeshkar, Sapan Chakraborty
4	"Meri Banno Ki Baraat"	Dilraj Kaur, Chorus
5	"Sun Chanve"	Bhupinder Singh, Dilraj Kaur
6	"O Basanti"	Shailendra Singh
7	"Yamma-Ee-Yamma-Oo"	K. J. Yesudas, Usha Mangeshkar
8	"Sun Sajna" (Part II)	K. J. Yesudas, Anuradha Paudwal
9	"Sun Sajna" (Part III)	Anuradha Paudwal
