= Laparwah =

1981 film

- Promotional poster
- Directed by: Ravikant Nagaich
- Produced by: F. A. Nadiadwala
- Starring: Mithun Chakraborty; Ranjeeta Kaur; Prema Narayan; Iftekhar; Shakti Kapoor
- Music by: Bappi Lahiri
- Production company: Pushpa Pictures
- Release date: 15 May 1981
- Running time: 135 min.
- Language: Hindi

Laparwah is a 1981 Hindi-language Indian action film directed by Ravikant Nagaich, starring Mithun Chakraborty, Ranjeeta Kaur, Prema Narayan and Shakti Kapoor in the leading roles.

== Cast ==
- Mithun Chakraborty as Shera/ Suraj
- Ranjeeta Kaur as Sandhya Singh
- Prema Narayan as Saloni
- Iftekhar as Inspector
- Shakti Kapoor as Raka
- Shubha Khote as Sandhya.s aunt
- Satyendra Kapoor as Johnny
- Purnima as Shera's mother
- Tej Sapru as Veeru
- Asit Sen as Kishori Lal
- Chandrashekhar as Babu
- Birbal as Raju
- Prem Bedi
- Bhushan Jeevan
- Sohail Khan
- Manmauji as Raghu
- Ram Mohan as Thakur Saheb
- Ram P. Sethi as Changu
- Sunder as Lalit Singh
- Raj Tilak

== Soundtrack ==
The music of this movie was composed by Bappi Lahiri, with lyrics written by Ramesh Pant. The music was released by the Saregama label.

1. "Paisa Jis Ke Paas Hai, Duniya Uski Das Hai" – Jatin Pandit
2. "Koi Bhi Dil Me Na Aaya Tha, Najro Se Sabki Bachya Tha" – Chandrani Mukherjee, Kishore Kumar
3. "Ghar Ki Tijori Me" – Jatin Pandit, Manna Dey
4. "Mehfil Me Aakar Saaqi Banu Ya Mehboobat" – Jatin Pandit, Usha Mangeshkar
5. "Tumko Maine Sapno Me To Dekha Tha" – Jatin Pandit
