= Riwaj =

- Directed by: Manoj Sati
- Written by: Manoj Sati
- Produced by: Kashish Khan
- Starring: Myra Sareen; Aftab Shivdasani; Anita Raj; Mithun Chakraborty; Jaya Prada; Zakir Hussain
- Cinematography: Raju Kaygee
- Edited by: Komal Varma
- Music by: Sultan Sulemani; Imran Wasim; Dipessh Kashyap
- Production companies: Kashish Khan Production
- Distributed by: Vantage Allianze Pte. Ltd; ZEE5
- Release date: 7 March 2025
- Running time: 130 minute
- Country: India
- Language: Hindi

Riwaj is a 2025 Indian Hindi-language film wriiten and directed by Manoj Sati and produced by Kashish Khan. It stars Myra Sareen, Aftab Shivdasani, Anita Raj, Mithun Chakraborty, Jaya Prada, Zakir Hussain in lead roles.

== Cast ==
- Myra Sareen as Zainab Shaikh
- Aftab Shivdasani as Hanif Qureshi
- Anita Raj as Raziya, Hanif's mother
- Mithun Chakraborty as Ramzan Qadir
- Jaya Prada as NGO Secretary
- Zakir Hussain as Lawyer Hidaayat Khan
- Ashwani Kapoor as Rajdeep Singh
- Kashish Khan as Farida
- Keeya Khanna as Shabnam
- Ajay Rawat as Firoz
- Nisha Singh as Asha
- Kumkum Das as Zainab's mother
- Aman Gupta as Samad

== Release ==
The film was premiered on 7 March 2025 on ZEE5.

== Critical reception ==
Archika Khurana for The Times of India rated the movie 2.5/5 stars and noted "Riwaj is a film with its heart in the right place. While its execution lacks finesse, the film’s emotional core and social relevance make it a worthy watch for those interested in issue-based dramas" Pratik Shekhar for News18 gave 3/5stars to the movie. Mid-Day reviewer opined "While Riwaj is an important film with a strong social message, its screenplay and pacing could have been tighter. Some scenes feel a bit dramatic, which slightly reduces its impact." A reviewer from Punjab Kesari rated the movie 3.5/5 stars.
