= Ghar Ek Mandir (film) =

1984 Hindi-language drama

- Poster
- Directed by: K.Bapaiah
- Written by: Gyandev Agnihotri; Kader Khan (dialogues)
- Produced by: A Krishnamurthy
- Starring: Shashi Kapoor; Moushumi Chatterjee; Mithun Chakraborty; Ranjeeta; Shakti Kapoor; Suresh Oberoi; Kader Khan; Raj Kiran
- Music by: Laxmikant–Pyarelal
- Production company: Tina Films International
- Release date: 9 March 1984
- Running time: 125 minutes
- Country: India
- Language: Hindi

Ghar Ek Mandir (transl. The House Is a Temple) is a 1984 Indian Hindi-language drama film directed by K.Bapaiah, starring Shashi Kapoor, Mithun Chakraborty, Ranjeeta, Moushumi Chatterjee, Shakti Kapoor, Suresh Oberoi, Kader Khan, and Raj Kiran. The film was remade in Tamil as Anni, starring Mohan and Saritha.

== Plot ==
A joint family consisting of three brothers – Prem (Shashi Kapoor), Vijay (Raj Kiran) and Ravi (Mithun Chakraborty) and Prem's wife Laxmi Moushumi Chatterjee lead a happy life – and consider their home a temple of love. However, destiny has other plans for them and Prem gets killed. Seth Dharampal (Kader Khan) goes all out to cheat them. Will Laxmi and Ravi be able to save their home? How do they thwart Seth Dharampal's evil intentions?

== Cast ==
- Shashi Kapoor as Prem
- Moushumi Chatterjee as Laxmi, Prem's wife
- Mithun Chakraborty as Ravi, Prem and Vijay's brother
- Raj Kiran as Vijay, Prem and Ravi's brother
- Ranjeeta Kaur as Sunita, Ravi's Love interest
- Shoma Anand as Sapna, Vijay's Love interest
- Suresh Oberoi as Rahim, Prem's family friend
- Shobana as Priya, Ravi's Friend (Cameo Appearance)
- Kader Khan as Seth Dharamdas
- Shakti Kapoor as Shera
- Prem Chopra as Sahu, Sunita's father
- Asrani as Bhim Singh
- Aruna Irani Ramkatori
- Prema Narayan as Sapna's friend
- Viju Khote as Man who changes the Khandala direction boarding cycle race
- Yusuf Khan as Shera's henchman
- Satyendra Kapoor as Kala Niketan Store Owner
- Rajendra Nath as Auctioner

== Soundtrack ==
All lyrics are written by Anand Bakshi; all music is composed by Laxmikant Pyarelal.

No.	Title	Singer(s)	Length
1.	"Oui Main Mar Gai"	Alka Yagnik, Shailendra Singh
2.	"Bum Babum Babi"	Kishore Kumar
3.	"Romantic Duet" (Humming Style)	Suresh Wadkar, Anuradha Paudwal
4.	"Bolo Jai Seeta Ram"	Suresh Wadkar, Shailendra Singh, Mehboob Chawan
5.	"Kab Se Khada Main Tere Liye"	Kishore Kumar, Asha Bhosle
6.	"Bolo Jai Seeta Ram" (Sad)	Suresh Wadkar
