= Anandalok Best Actor Award =

Award Category

Anandalok Puraskar or Anandalok Awards (Bengali: আনন্দলোক পুরস্কার) ceremony is one of the most prominent film events for Bengali Cinema in India. Anandalok, the only Bengali language film magazine, is published by Ananda Publishers; Ananda Bazar Patrika presents this award. The magazine was started on 25 January 1975 and the awards ceremony was started in 1998.

== Winners ==
Year	Winner	Film
1998	Subhendu Chatterjee	Lal Darja
1999	Prosenjit Chatterjee	Ranokhetro
2000	Soumitra Chatterjee	Attiyosojon and Asukh
2001	Mithun Chakraborty	Chaka
2002	Sabyasachi Chakraborty	Ek Je Ache Kanya
2003	Jeet	Sathi
2004	Sabyasachi Chakraborty	Bombayer Bombete
2005	Jeet	Manik
2006	Prosenjit Chatterjee	Dosar
2007	Mithun Chakraborty	MLA Fatakeshto
2008	Rahul Banerjee	Chirodini Tumi Je Amar
2010	Dev	Le Chakka
2011	Prosenjit Chatterjee	Moner Manush
2012	Parambrata Chatterjee	Hemlock Society
2022	Jisshu Sengupta	Abhijaan
2025	Dev; Chandan Sen (Critic's Choice); Tota Roychowdhury(for OTT)	Khadaan; Manikbabur Megh; Jaha Bolibo Sotyo Bolibo
2026	Jeet; Mahabrata Basu (Critic's Choice)	Keu Bole Biplobi Keu Bole Dakat; Pokkhirajer Dim

== Records ==
Records	Name	Times	Years
Most Winner	Prosenjit Chatterjee; Jeet	3	(1999, 2006, 2011) (2003, 2005, 2026)
First Winner	Subhendu Chatterjee		1998
Last Winner	Jeet, Mahabrata Basu		2026
Second Most Winners	Sabyasachi Chakraborty; Mithun Chakraborty, Dev	2	(2002, 2004), (2001, 2007), (2009, 2025)

== See also ==
- List of Asian television awards
