= Enemmy =

Enemmy: Law And Disorder
- Theatrical Poster
- Directed by: Ashu Trikha
- Screenplay by: Ashu Trikha
- Produced by: Yogita Bali
- Starring: Mithun Chakraborty; Sunil Shetty; Mahakshay Chakraborty; Kay Kay Menon; Johnny Lever; Deepraj Rana; Zakir Hussain
- Cinematography: Kedar Gaekwad
- Edited by: Sanjay Sankla
- Music by: Bappi Lahiri; Gourov Dasgupta
- Release date: 21 June 2013
- Running time: 128 mins
- Country: India
- Languages: Bengali; Hindi

Enemmy is a 2013 Indian bilingual neo-Western buddy cop action thriller film written and directed by Ashu Trikha. Simultaneously shot in Bengali and Hindi-languages, the title of the film is intentionally misspelt using the 6 main characters initials. The film stars an ensemble cast of Mithun Chakraborty, Sunil Shetty, Mahakshay Chakraborty, Kay Kay Menon, Johnny Lever, Zakir Hussain and Yuvika Chaudhary and Deepraj Rana.

== Plot ==
Enemmy follows daredevil CID officers tracking an underworld don.

Six undercover cops, officers Eklavya Karmarkar, Naeem Shaikh, Madhav Sinha, and Eric Collaco, and Pakya Seth and Yugandhar Vishnoi get the assignment to stop a gang war over a missing sum of money. They manage to put the underworld don Mukhtar Memon behind bars, but that doesn't solve the problem. Later, a senior CBI officer, Yugandhar Vishnoi, starts investigating the case.

== Cast ==
- Mithun Chakraborty as Yugandhar Vishnoi, a Central Bureau Investigation Department Officer
- Sunil Shetty as Eklavya Karmarkar / Bhau, a Criminal Investigation Department Officer
- Kay Kay Menon as Naeem Shaikh, a Criminal Investigation Department Officer
- Johnny Lever as Eric Collaco, a Criminal Investigation Department Officer
- Mahakshay Chakraborty as Madhav Sinha aka Maddy, a Criminal Investigation Department Officer
- Zakir Hussain as Mukhtar Memon, the Underworld don (as the Killer of Pakya and Naeem)
- Yuvika Chaudhary as Priya Shaikh, Naeem's wife
- Priyanka Upendra as Pooja Karmarkar, Eklavya's wife
- Akshay Kapoor as Chief Minister Ram Govardhan alias "CMRG" (Politician)
- Mumaith Khan as item number "Katrina Ko Kareena Ko"
- Deepraj Rana as Pakya Seth, Criminal Investigation Department Informer
- Sharat Saxena as "Raghu" Raghunath Pandey
- Shantanu Bhamare

== Soundtrack ==
Soundtrack was composed by Bappi Lahiri and Gourav Dasgupta.

No.	Title	Singer(s)	Length
1.	"Katrina Ko Kareena Ko"	Bappi Lahiri, Mamta Sharma	4:30
2.	"Bheege Naina"	Keshav	6:32
3.	"Enemmy"	Gourav Dasgupta	4:30
4.	"Hit The Lights"	Gaurav Dasgupta, Torsha Sarkar	3:33

== Reception ==
Johnson Thomas of the Free Press Journal said the film was "shot in the old-fashioned style reminiscent of the late 80's Bollywoodian pot-boilers" with a "stupidly revelatory plotting" and performances that are "all quite unattractive to say the least".
