= Baazi (1984 film) =

- Directed by: Raj N. Sippy
- Produced by: K. K. Talwar
- Starring: Dharmendra; Mithun Chakraborty; Rekha; Ranjeeta; Shakti Kapoor; Madan Puri
- Cinematography: Anwar Siraj
- Music by: Laxmikant–Pyarelal
- Release date: 27 April 1984
- Running time: 136 minutes
- Country: India
- Language: Hindi

Baazi is a 1984 Indian Hindi-language action film directed by Raj N. Sippy. The film stars Dharmendra, Mithun Chakraborty, Rekha, Ranjeeta, Shakti Kapoor, Madan Puri and Mac Mohan.

== Plot ==
Ajay Sharma, is a Police Inspector of notable wealth. He is happily married to Asha with two children. Many a times he goes out of his work area to destructively capture dangerous criminals and inadvertently falls under disciplinary warning with his concerned superiors. After repeated warnings he is discharged from the Police force. He decides to go back to his boyhood town by joining his father in the family business. They are living happily. However a notable Criminal going by the name of Rocky and his uncle trace Ajay to his home town and decide to set up a casino. Past its grand opening, Ajay and his friend Albert visit the casino and fall under a confrontation with the gamekeeper and management when they are cheated during the game. During the fight, Albert is killed and Ajay is seriously wounded.

In a parallel storyline, a young man named Salim seeks employment in the town and beings to court a woman named Noora, a dabbawala. Rocky is impressed with Salim's strength and hires him as his henchman. When Ajay comes to the casino to avenge Albert's death, Ajay & Salim become embroiled in a serious a fight. Rocky accidentally injures Salim, but diverts the blame to Ajay.

When Salim sees Ajay's cut, he realises that Rocky is out to harm them both. Ajay and Salim join hands and fight the goons. The goons while trying to shoot Ajay kill Asha instead. Ajay and Salim avenge Asha's death by killing Rocky and their leader.

== Cast ==
- Dharmendra as Police Inspector Ajay Sharma
- Rekha as Mrs. Asha Sharma
- Mithun Chakraborty as Salim Khan
- Ranjeeta as Noora
- Shakti Kapoor as Rocky
- Madan Puri as Durgaprasad Sharma
- Mac Mohan as Rocky's accomplice
- Prema Narayan as Casino Singer

== Soundtrack ==
Lyrics: Anand Bakshi

Title	Singer(s)
"Noora De De"	Kishore Kumar, Asha Bhosle
"Gupchup Hai Mummy Gumsum Hai Daddy"	Kishore Kumar, Asha Bhosle, Shivangi Kolhapure, Baby Rajeshwari
"Mere Saathi Jeevan Saathi"	Lata Mangeshkar, Shabbir Kumar
"Mere Saathi Jeevan Saathi" (Party)	Lata Mangeshkar, Shabbir Kumar
"Kaise Pyar Hota Hai"	Asha Bhosle
"Thodi Si Khusi Hai Thoda Sa Hai"	Asha Bhosle, Shabbir Kumar, Shivangi Kolhapure, Baby Rajeshwari
