= Taraana =

- Taraana
- Directed by: Deepak Bahry
- Written by: Khalid-Narvi
- Produced by: Tarachand Barjatya
- Starring: Mithun Chakraborty; Ranjeeta; Jagdeep; Shreeram Lagoo
- Cinematography: Arvind Laad
- Edited by: Mukhtar Ahmed
- Music by: Raam Laxman
- Distributed by: Rajshri Productions
- Release date: 31 July 1979 (India)
- Country: India
- Language: Hindi

Taraana is a 1979 Hindi film produced by Tarachand Barjatya for Rajshri Productions. The film stars Mithun Chakravorty, Ranjeeta, Bhagwan Dada, Om Shivpuri, Jagdeep, Shreeram Lagoo, Jayshree T., Urmila Bhatt and Sharat Saxena. The film's music is by Vijay Patil, also known as Raam Laxman.

== Cast ==
- Mithun Chakraborty as Shyam
- Ranjeeta Kaur as Radha
- Bhagwan Dada
- Dr. Shreeram Lagoo
- Om Shivpuri
- Jagdeep
- Jayshree T.
- Sharat Saxena
- Urmila Bhatt

== Soundtrack ==
All the songs were composed by Music Director Raamlaxman and lyrics were penned by Ravindra Rawal and Tilakraj Thapar.

#	Title	Singer(s)	Lyricist	Duration
1	"Sultana Mera Naam Hai Sultana"	Meena Mangeshkar	Ravinder Rawal	03:33
2	"Gunche Lage Hain Kahne"	Shailendra Singh	Tilak Raj Thapar	03:54
3	"Hum Tum Dono"	Shailendra Singh, Usha Mangeshkar	Tilak Raj Thapar	03:36
4	"Kaisi Yeh Judai Hai"	Shailendra Singh, Usha Mangeshkar	Tilak Raj Thapar	04:10
5	"Meri Ankh Phadakti Hai"	Usha Mangeshkar, Varsha Bhosle	Ravinder Rawal	03:31
6	"Meri Dilruba Tujko Aana Padega"	Shailendra Singh	Tilak Raj Thapar	04:55
7	"Honthon Pe Aaye Tera Naam"	Usha Mangeshkar	Tilak Raj Thapar	04:10
8	"Jo Baharon Se Nazaro Se"	Shailendra Singh	Ravinder Rawal	03:57
9	"Hone Do Faisla Jeet Ka Haar Ka"	Chetan, Meena Patki, Usha Mangeshkar, Shailendra Singh	Tilak Raj Thapar	03:48
10	"Chhodo Baiyan Na Chhedo Mohe"	Meena Mangeshkar, Shailendra Singh	Ravinder Rawal	03:52
