= Chaka (film) =

- DVD Cover
- Directed by: Nepaldev Bhattacharjee
- Written by: Nepaldev Bhattacharjee
- Produced by: Sachetana Goshthi
- Starring: Mithun Chakraborty; Debashree Roy; Satinath Mukhopadhyay; Alaka Gangopadhyay; Rahul Banerjee; Kalyan Chatterjee
- Music by: Kalyan Sen Barat
- Release date: 2000
- Country: India
- Language: Bengali

Chaka (lit. 'Wheel') is a 2000 Indian Bengali drama film written and directed by Nepaldev Bhattacharjee. The screenplay was written by Prashanta Bhattacharjee. The film revolves around the life of two 1971 immigrants. It delineates the struggle of a marginalized jobless labourer and his wife, and the adversities they undergo. The plot is invariably imbued with communist postulations. The music of the film was composed by Kalyan Sen Barat, with lyrics penned by Pulak Banerjee and Nachiketa. The chief assistant director of the film is Madhuchhanda Sengupta. It stars Mithun Chakraborty and Debashree Roy in the lead.

The film created ripples upon its release and received moderate reviews from critics. It received 7.3 rating out of 10 on Mubi. Chakraborty's portrayal of Manik Mondal was well received by the critics once again generating the speculation that he well perceives the marginalized impulse. The film won Chakraborty his first Anandalok Award in the category of the best actor in a leading role, in 2001. It was not a financial success.

== Plot ==
Manik is in love with Jhumur and intends to marry her. Manik and Jhumur often meet and hang around. Though he is an ordinary labourer who leads a poverty-stricken life, he becomes a significant financial help for the upcoming wedding of Bhadu, Jhumur's sister. One day he learns that Jhumur is in love with another man but her mother Jaba does not want her to reveal it before Manik. Jhumur's mother fears that Manik may quit helping them if the truth is revealed. Even though Manik is now aware that he has so long been exploited by Jhumur's mother, he does not turn outrageous nor he stops helping the family. He visits a brothel and falls in love with a beautiful prostitute Tagar whom he marries even though she reminds him that she is a fallen woman who has no social dignity.

17 years later, Tagar runs a poverty-stricken family. They have a daughter Purnima who is suffering from thalassemia and a boy named Babua. Manik has become jobless because of lockdown in his factory. He has contracted tuberculosis and become frustrated. Tagar works as a maid in Sujato's house. The latter moves by a wheelchair. Tagar, one day, wants to know the price a wheelchair. Sujato who feels compassionate towards her, arranges for a wheelchair free of cost. The arrival of a wheelchair leads to Manik's suspicion. He assumes that she has an illegitimate sexual relationship with Sujato and this is why she can afford to buy more for their family. He grows abhorrent of the life he and Tagar have and intends to assassinate his family after coming across a newspaper report of a labourer assassinating his family and then committing suicide. When he attempts to strangle Tagar, she urges that she wants to live and struggle for her family. Her urges revive his conscience. Once again they resolve to struggle together.

== Cast ==
- Mithun Chakraborty as Manik Mondal
- Debashree Roy as Tagar, Manik's wife
- Basanti Das as Purnima, the daughter of Manik and Tagar
- Tithi Mahabadi as Babua, the son of Manik and Tagar
- Satinath Mukherjee as Sujato
- Rajasree Bhowmik as Jhumur
- Ivy Biswas as Bhadu, Jhumur's sister
- Gargi Dasgupta as Tushu, Jhumur's youngest sister
- Alaka Ganguly as Jaba, the mother of Jhumur, Bhadu and Tushu
- Rahul Banerjee as Phatik
- Kalyan Chatterjee as Bharat
- Pushpita Mukherjee as Banu
- Piloo Bhattacharjee as Shankar
- Ketaki Dutta as Mashi, the head of the brothel (Cameo)
- Paran Bandyopadhyay as the manager of the mess
- Sunil Mukherjee as Kajal

== Awards ==
Year	Title	Category	Recipient	Result	Ref.
2001	Anandalok Puraskar	Best actor	Mithun Chakraborty	Won	
