= Ranjeeta Kaur =

Indian actress (born 1956)

- Born: Ranjeeta Mirza; 22 September 1956 (age 69)
- Occupation: Actress
- Years active: 1976–present
- Spouse: Raj Masand
- Children: 1

Ranjeeta Kaur (born 22 September 1956) is an Indian actress. She was trained at FTII. She has appeared in around 47 films. She has portrayed a variety of characters and her films include Laila Majnu (1976), Ankhiyon Ke Jharokhon Se (1978) and Pati Patni Aur Woh (1978). She was nominated for the Filmfare Awards three, including for two of the above films.

== Personal life ==
Ranjeeta was born as Ranjeeta Kaur Mirza on 22 September 1956 in Punjab. She adopted her mother's maiden name, Kaur, after entering the entertainment industry.

Kaur is married to Raj Masand and has a son named Sky. Kaur lived in the past with her family in Norfolk, Virginia, US, where they own a series of 7-Eleven stores. They moved to Koregaon Park, Pune, a few years ago.

== Career ==
Kaur started her film career as the lead opposite Rishi Kapoor in the film Laila Majnu (1976). Subsequently, she acted in commercially successful films like Pati Patni Aur Woh (with Sanjeev Kumar) and Ankhiyon Ke Jharokhon Se (with Sachin). She made a fabulous team with Mithun Chakravorty in films such as Surakshaa, Taraana, Humse Badhkar Kaun, Aadat Se Majboor, Baazi and Ghar Ek Mandir (1984). She played Amitabh Bachchan's heroine in Satte Pe Satta. Kaur was associated with the Rajshri family having been in many of their successful films. She starred opposite Rishi Kapoor, Sachin, Raj Babbar, Raj Kiran, Deepak Parashar, Vinod Mehra and Amol Palekar in several films. Her last film before her exit from the film industry was Gunahon Ka Devta in 1990. She appeared in a few television serials in the mid 1990s and then took a hiatus from acting.

After 15 years, she returned to films in Anjaane: The Unknown (2005). In 2008 she starred in Zindagi Tere Naam which reunited her with Mithun Chakraborty. The film had a delayed release in 2012. In 2011, she reunited with Sachin in Jaana Pehchana, a sequel to Ankhiyon Ke Jharokhon Se. This is her last film to date as of 2025.

== Filmography ==
=== Films ===
Year	Film	Role	Notes
1976	Laila Majnu	Laila	Debut film with Rishi Kapoor
1978	Ankhiyon Ke Jharokhon Se	Lily Fernandes	Nominated 1979 Filmfare Award for Best Actress
1978	Damaad		
1978	Pati Patni Aur Woh	Nirmala Deshpande	Nominated 1979 Filmfare Award for Best Supporting Actress
1979	Meri Biwi Ki Shaadi	Priya Bartendu (Pee)	
1979	Bhayaanak	Renu	
1979	Surakshaa	Priya	
1979	Tarana	Radha	
1980	Aap To Aise Na The	Varsha Oberoi	
1980	Unees Bees		
1980	Khwab		
1981	Armaan	Aarti	
1981	Dhuan	Sheila	
1981	Dard		
1981	Hum Se Badkar Kaun		
1981	Krodhi	Guddi	
1981	Laparwah	Sandya	
1982	Rajput	Kamli	
1982	Ustadi Ustad Se	Seema	
1982	Satte Pe Satta	Seema Singh	
1982	Sun Sajna	Basanti	
1982	Teri Kasam	Shanti	Nominated 1983 Filmfare Award for Best Supporting Actress
1982	Hathkadi		
1983	Haadsa	Robby	
1983	Kaun? Kaisey?	Renu/Sheila	
1983	Mehndi	Madhuri 'Madhu'	
1983	Mujhe Insaaf Chahiye		
1983	Woh Jo Hasina		
1984	Baazi	Noora	
1984	Raaj Tilak	Sapna	
1984	Ghar Ek Mandir		
1986	Kismatwala		
1986	Qatl	Sita (Nurse)	
1986	Africadalli Sheela	Sheela's mother	Kannada film
1987	Sheela	Sheela's mother	
1989	Do Qaidi	Mrs. Amar Sinha	
1989	Gawaahi		
1990	Deewana Mujh Sa Nahin	Anita's sister	
1990	Gunahon Ka Devta	Mrs. Baldev Sharma	
2005	Anjaane: The Unknown	Roma	
2011	Jaana Pehchana	Miss. Asha	
2012	Zindagi Tere Naam	Mrs. Singh	

=== Television ===
- Ajube 1992)
- Saahil (1996)
- Ghutan (1997)
- Noor Jehan (2000)

== Awards and nominations ==
Year	Award	Category	Film	Result
1979	Filmfare Awards	Best Actress	Ankhiyon Ke Jharokhon Se	Nominated
1979	Filmfare Awards	Best Supporting Actress	Pati Patni Aur Woh	Nominated
1983	Filmfare Awards	Best Supporting Actress	Teri Kasam	Nominated
