= Mithun Chakraborty =

Indian actor (born 1950)

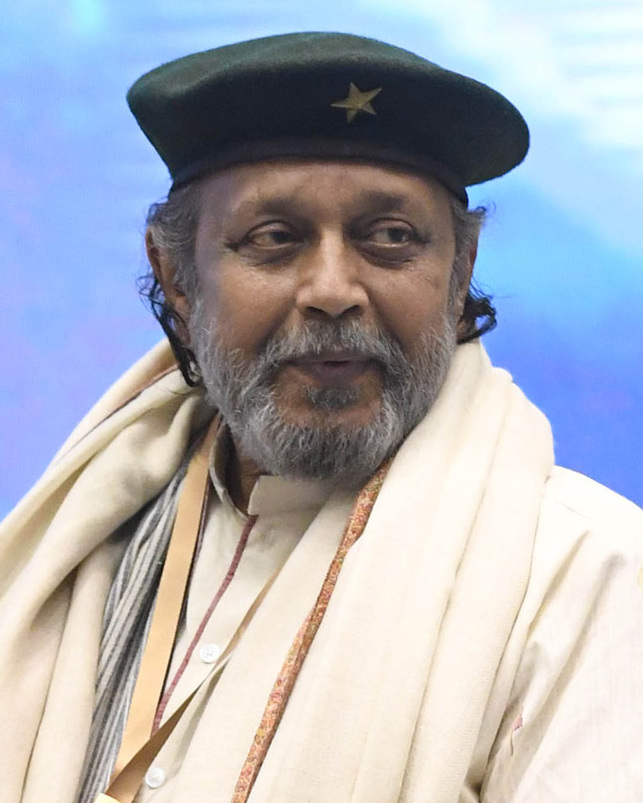
- Chakraborty in 2022

Member of Parliament, Rajya Sabha
- In office 3 April 2014 – 29 December 2016
- Succeeded by: Manish Gupta
- Constituency: West Bengal

Advisor to Government of West Bengal for Information and Cultural Affairs Department
- Incumbent
- Assumed office 7 October 2026
- Chief Minister: Suvendu Adhikari
- Preceded by: Position established

Personal details
- Born: Gouranga Chakraborty; 16 June 1950 (age 76) Calcutta, West Bengal, India
- Party: Bharatiya Janata Party (2021–present)
- Other political affiliations: Trinamool Congress (2014–2016); Communist Party of India (Marxist–Leninist) (until 1976)
- Spouses: Helena Luke (m. 1979; div. 1979); Yogeeta Bali (m. 1979)
- Children: 4; including Mahakshay and Ushmey
- Relatives: See Chakraborty family
- Education: Film and Television Institute of India
- Occupation: Actor; producer; entrepreneur; television presenter; politician
- Awards: Padma Bhushan (2024); Dadasaheb Phalke Award (2022); Banga Bibhushan (2013)
- Years active: 1976–present
- Nicknames: Disco King; Grandmaster; Mithun Da

Mithun Chakraborty (born Gouranga Chakraborty; 16 June 1950) is an Indian actor, film producer, entrepreneur and politician. In a career spanning over five decades, he has done 350 films, mostly in Hindi and Bengali languages, and a few in Bhojpuri, Telugu, Odia, Tamil, Kannada, and Punjabi. Referred to as "Mahaguru" (Bengali for "The Great Teacher"), he is a former Rajya Sabha Member of Parliament. He is the recipient of three National Film Awards and four Filmfare Awards. In January 2024, Chakraborty was awarded the Padma Bhushan, the third-highest civilian honour by the Government of India. He was also awarded India's highest accolade in the field of cinema, the Dadasaheb Phalke Award for the year 2022, whose announcement came from the Union Ministry of Information and Broadcasting in September 2024.

He is one of the most successful actors of Indian Cinema.

Chakraborty made his acting debut with art house drama Mrigayaa (1976), directed by Mrinal Sen, for which he won his first National Film Award for Best Actor. His major breakthrough role came with Bengali film Nadi Theke Sagare (1978). Chakraborty gained greater fame with the 1982 film Disco Dancer, which was a major box office success in India and the Soviet Union. Besides Disco Dancer, Chakraborty also gained recognition for many other performances as both a lead and character artist. Chakraborty's performance in Agneepath won him the Filmfare Award for Best Supporting Actor in 1990.

Chakraborty owns the Monarch Group, which has interests in the hospitality and educational sectors. He also started the production house Paparatzy Productions. In 1992, he, along with Dilip Kumar and Sunil Dutt, set up a trust to help actors in need of assistance called the Cine & T.V Artistes Association (CINTAA). He was also the Chairperson of Film Studios Setting & Allied Mazdoor Union, which protects the welfare of cinema workers and resolves their demands and problems. The television show Dance India Dance, where Chakraborty was the Grand Master, also entered in the Limca Book of Records and the Guinness World Records. Chakraborty played a crucial mediating role between Pranab Mukherjee of the Indian National Congress and Mamata Banerjee, winning Mukherjee the support of Banerjee's party, the All India Trinamool Congress, in the 2012 Indian presidential election. He joined the Bharatiya Janata Party (BJP) on 7 March 2021, ahead of the 2021 West Bengal Legislative Assembly election.

== Early life and education ==
Mithun Chakraborty was born on 16 June 1950 into a Bengali Hindu family in Calcutta (now Kolkata), West Bengal, India to Basanta Kumar Chakraborty and Shanti Rani Chakraborty. He studied at Oriental Seminary and later dropped out after completing his B.Sc. second year in Chemistry from Scottish Church College in Kolkata. Later, he attended and graduated from the Film and Television Institute of India, Pune. He was a Naxalite before entering films, but tragedy struck his family. It is widely reported that his only brother was electrocuted and killed in an accident, whereas his sister Kalyani has confirmed to journalist Pankaj Shukla and others who reached her, that Mithun is the only son of his parents. He returned to his family and left the Naxalite ideology, even though this posed a grave risk to his own life.

== Film career ==
=== Early career (1976–1981) ===
Chakraborty made his Hindi film debut in 1976 with Mrinal Sen's art-house film Mrigayaa, for which he won the National Film Award for Best Actor. That same year, he played a brief role in Dulal Guha's hit thriller Do Anjaane which starred Amitabh Bachchan, Rekha and Prem Chopra in the lead.

In 1978, Chakraborty made his debut in Bengali cinema with Arabinda Mukhopadhyay's romantic blockbuster Nadi Theke Sagare. He also co-starred alongside Rameshwari in Mera Rakshak. A remake of R. Thyagarajan's own directional venture Aattukara Alamelu (1977), it performed well commercially. In 1979, Chakraborty delivered another hit with Ravikant Nagaich's spy thriller Surakksha. This was followed by a string of successful films, such as Taraana (1979), Patita (1980), Unees-Bees (1980), Hum Paanch (1980) and Hum Se Badhkar Kaun (1981) and the Bengali film Kalankini Kankabati (1981).

=== Peak years & SuperStardom (1982–1995) ===
In 1982, Chakraborty had a string of successes with Shaukeen, Ashanti and Taqdeer Ka Badshah. He shot to Superstardom in the same year with B. Subhash's dance film Disco Dancer. The film proved to be a hit domestically and an "all-time blockbuster" in overseas markets. It became the first Indian film to gross ₹1 billion (US$11 million). The soundtrack, composed by Bappi Lahiri, was successful in the charts and played a large role in the box office success of the film, especially in countries like Soviet Union and China. The same year, Chakraborty established himself in Bengali cinema with Gautam Mukherjee's musical blockbuster Troyee. In 1983, he played lead roles in T. Rama Rao and Deepak Bahry's commercially successful films - Mujhe Insaaf Chahiye and Hum Se Hai Zamana, respectively, and Basu Chatterjee's critically acclaimed light-hearted romance Pasand Apni Apni.</ref> The following year, he appeared alongside Shashi Kapoor, Moushmi Chatterjee and Ranjeeta in the family drama film Ghar Ek Mandir. At release, it was derided by critics, but went on to become a success at the box office. The box office success of Ghar Ek Mandir was followed by two more successes in Baazi and Kasam Paida Karne Wale Ki.

Chakraborty hit his peak in the mid-1980s. In 1985, he acted in Vijay Sadanah's romantic drama Pyar Jhukta Nahin, opposite Padmini Kolhapure. The film opened to excellent audience response and went on to become a blockbuster. The soundtrack, composed by Laxmikant–Pyarelal, became the tenth best-selling Hindi film album of the 1980s. Chakraborty followed it with a superhit in J. P. Dutta's action drama Ghulami, co-starring Dharmendra, Naseeruddin Shah, Reena Roy, Smita Patil and Anita Raj. His other major commercial success that year was another of B. Subhash's directional ventures, Aandhi-Toofan. Chakraborty's run continued in 1986 with K. Bapayya's blockbuster family drama film Swarag Se Sunder, which also starred Jeetendra, Jaya Prada and Kolhapure in the lead. That same year, Chakraborty starred in Umesh Mehra's successful action film Jaal, followed by two more successes, Dilwaala and Muddat. Apart from box office success, he received acclaim for his performance in Basu Chatterjee's Sheesha, which was one of the first Hindi films centred around sexual harassment in a workplace. The following year, he starred in Dance Dance, Parivaar and Watan Ke Rakhwale alongside moderately profitable films, Hawalaat and Hiraasat. In 1988, Chakraborty reunited with K. Bapayya for Pyar Ka Mandir, co-starring Madhavi, Nirupa Roy, Sachin Pilgaonkar, Raj Kiran and Shoma Anand. The film performed well at the box office and was declared a "superhit" by trade pundits. He then appeared alongside Sridevi and Moushmi Chatterjee in the action drama film Waqt Ki Awaz, which became a hit, followed by moderate successes in Charnon Ki Saugandh, Jeete Hain Shaan Se and Commando. 1989 became a successful year for Chakraborty, with five of his films emerging as commercial successes - Daata, Prem Pratigyaa, Mujrim, Aakhri Ghulam and Ilaaka.

He began the 1990s with unsuccessful ventures, such as Pati Patni Aur Tawaif (1990) and Humse Na Takrana (1990), while his most notable release of 1990 was Mukul Anand's action crime film Agneepath alongside Amitabh Bachchan, which although a flop, received highly positive response from critics. Chakraborty later won the Filmfare Award for Best Supporting Actor for his work in the film. For the next three years, his successful films included Pyar Ka Devta (1991), Swarg Yahan Narak Yahan (1991), Dil Aashna Hai (1992), Ghar Jamai (1992), Dalaal (1993), Aadmi (1993) and Phool Aur Angaar (1993). Chakraborty won the National Film Award for Best Actor in Buddhadeb Dasgupta's critically acclaimed Bengali film Tahader Katha (1992).

Chakraborty's career as a matinee idol faded in the mid-1990s, as he took a break from mainstream Hindi cinema and began working in low-budget productions, most of which lacked success due in part to their poor quality. Beginning in 1994, he starred in many such films, the majority of which performed poorly at the box office, with a few exceptions including Cheetah (1994), Jallaad (1995) and Ravan Raaj: A True Story (1995); the latter was Chakraborty's final hit as a lead actor.

=== Career fluctuations (1996–2006) ===
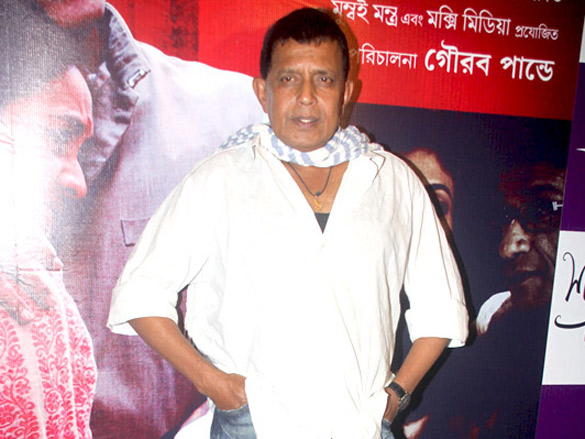
Mithun at the premiere of Bengali film Shukno Lanka

Post-stardom, Chakraborty continued to star in substandard productions which failed to propel his career forward. He appeared in hundreds of such films produced under his home banner Mithun's Dream Factory. He refused to accept a role the universally acclaimed Tamil film Iruvar (1997) as his character had to crop his hair, which would have affected his other 15 films at that time. By this time, Chakraborty held the record for appearing in the most Hindi films as a hero. During this phase, he saw moderate successes in Shapath (1997) and Chandaal (1998) and won the National Film Award for Best Supporting Actor for playing Ramakrishna Paramahansa in G.V. Iyer's biographical drama Swami Vivekananda (1998).

With his Bollywood career taking a backseat, Chakraborty began to focus on Bengali films in the early 2000s. From 2000 to 2006, he appeared in highly acclaimed films like Nepaldev Bhattacharjee's Chaka (2000), Rituparno Ghosh's Titli (2002), Prasanta Bal's Ferari Fauj (2002) and Narayan Rao's Santrash (2003). He returned to mainstream Hindi films in 2005 with the highly anticipated films Elaan and Lucky: No Time for Love, but contrary to expectations, both the films proved to be critical and commercial failures and were unable to re-establish Chakraborty.

=== Return to prominence and Television appearances (2007–2025) ===
Chakraborty made a comeback in 2007 with Mani Ratnam's Guru. The film received a positive response from critics and became a box office hit. Chakraborty's performance as an honest editor was met with immense acclaim, and he received a nomination in the Filmfare Award for Best Supporting Actor category. The same year, he made a guest appearance in the song "Deewangi Deewangi" from Farah Khan's reincarnation drama Om Shanti Om.

After another series of flops, Chakraborty appeared in Rohit Shetty's multi-starrer comedy Golmaal 3 in 2010. It grossed ₹1.69 billion (US$18 million) and was declared a blockbuster by Box Office India. The huge success of Golmaal 3 was followed by two more hits in 2012 with Housefull 2, OMG – Oh My God!, as well as an average hit with Khiladi 786.

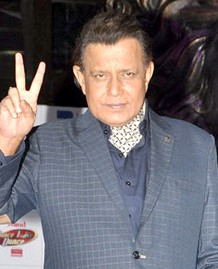
Chakraborty at the launch of Dance India Dance

After the success of the Bengali competitive dance reality show Dance Bangla Dance, Chakraborty developed the concept of Dance India Dance. This Indian dance competition show airs on Zee TV in India, is produced by UTV Software Communications, and has become India's largest dance-based reality show. The contestants perform before a panel of judges composed of Terrence Lewis, Remo D'Souza and Geeta Kapoor. The selection of the season's top 18 live show finalists is overseen by Chakraborty as the head judge. The show has won several television awards for most popular dance reality show. Chakraborty was also the grand master of Dance India Dance Li'l Masters, as well as the host of the reality show Dadagiri Unlimited on Zee Bangla channel, replacing Sourav Ganguly. Chakraborty hosted the Bengali version of Bigg Boss and Rannaghore Rockstar on ETV Bangla. He made his acting debut on TV with the comedy show The Drama Company.

Chakraborty had two full-fledged releases in 2013 - Enemmy and the much anticipated Boss, both of which were critical and commercial failures. He then played a supporting role in the Salman Khan action comedy film Kick (2014). The film took an initial of ₹260 million and earned ₹3.88 billion (US$41 million) by the end of its run, emerging a blockbuster at the box office.

In 2015, Chakraborty made his Telugu and Tamil cinema debut with Gopala Gopala and Yagavarayinum Naa Kaakka respectively. While Gopala Gopala did well at the box office, the latter was unsuccessful. That same year, he appeared in Vibhu Puri's critically acclaimed historical drama Hawaizaada alongside Ayushmann Khurrana and Pallavi Sharda. He made his Kannada film debut with the successful action thriller, The Villain, in 2018.

In 2019, Chakraborty played an important role in Vivek Agnihotri's political thriller The Tashkent Files. It received negative reviews from critics, but the audience reception was positive. As a result, it ran in cinemas for more than 100 days, eventually emerging as a sleeper hit at the box office. After a year's gap, Chakraborty appeared in Ram Gopal Varma's horror thriller 12 'O' Clock.

In 2021, Chakraborty appeared as co-judge in Star Jalsha's Dance Dance Junior alongside Tollywood actors Soham Chakraborty and Srabanti Chatterjee.

He appeared as a co-judge with Karan Johar and Parineeti Chopra on the reality show Hunarbaaz: Desh Ki Shaan, which premiered on Colors TV in January 2022.

In 2022, he starred in two notable box office successes, one in Hindi and one in Bengali. The first one was Agnihotri's The Kashmir Files based on the Exodus of Kashmiri Hindus. Despite receiving polarising response from reviewers, it grossed ₹3.40 billion (US$36 million) worldwide and was declared a major blockbuster by the end of its run. He received another nomination in the Filmfare Award for Best Supporting Actor category for his performance of a retired IAS officer in The Kashmir Files. Chakraborty later starred in Avijit Sen's family drama Projapoti alongside Dev. The film became a blockbuster at the box office. He made his digital debut in 2022 with Prime Video's web show Bestseller. In 2023, he played the title role in Suman Ghosh's Bengali film Kabuliwala. In 2024, he played the title role in Shastri another release in 2024 was successful film Bengali film Shontaan.

Between 2023 and 2025, Chakraborty returned to the set of Dance Bangla Dance on Zee Bangla as Mahaguru.

In 2025 his film Riwaj directly released on Zee5. He will be next seen in The Bengal Files. His collaboration again with Dev in Projapati 2 (2025) was successful.

=== (2026–present) ===
In 2026, the action comedy Jailer 2 marks the actor-politician's second Tamil outing after the 2015 film Yagavarayinum Naa Kaakka.

== Political career ==
Chakraborty became a Member of Parliament after he was nominated for the Rajya Sabha Member of Parliament elections by the Chief Minister of West Bengal Mamata Banerjee for her All India Trinamool Congress (TMC) in the West Bengal Rajya Sabha Assembly Polls, which were held on 7 February 2014. On 26 December 2016, he resigned as a Rajya Sabha MP. Chakraborty joined the Bharatiya Janata Party (BJP) on 7 March 2021, ahead of the 2021 West Bengal Legislative Assembly election, in the presence of Prime Minister Narendra Modi and Kailash Vijayvargiya.

== Brand ambassador ==
In the late 1980s, Chakraborty was an Indian ambassador for Panasonic. He was the face of GoDaddy, an internet domain registrar and web-hosting company.

He was also the face of Channel 10, a unit of Bengal Media, owned by Saradha Media Group, and he later said "Saradha didn't pay my dues" as its branch Saradha Chit Fund collapsed. Chakraborty was also the face of Manappuram Gold Loan for West Bengal state.

== Personal life ==
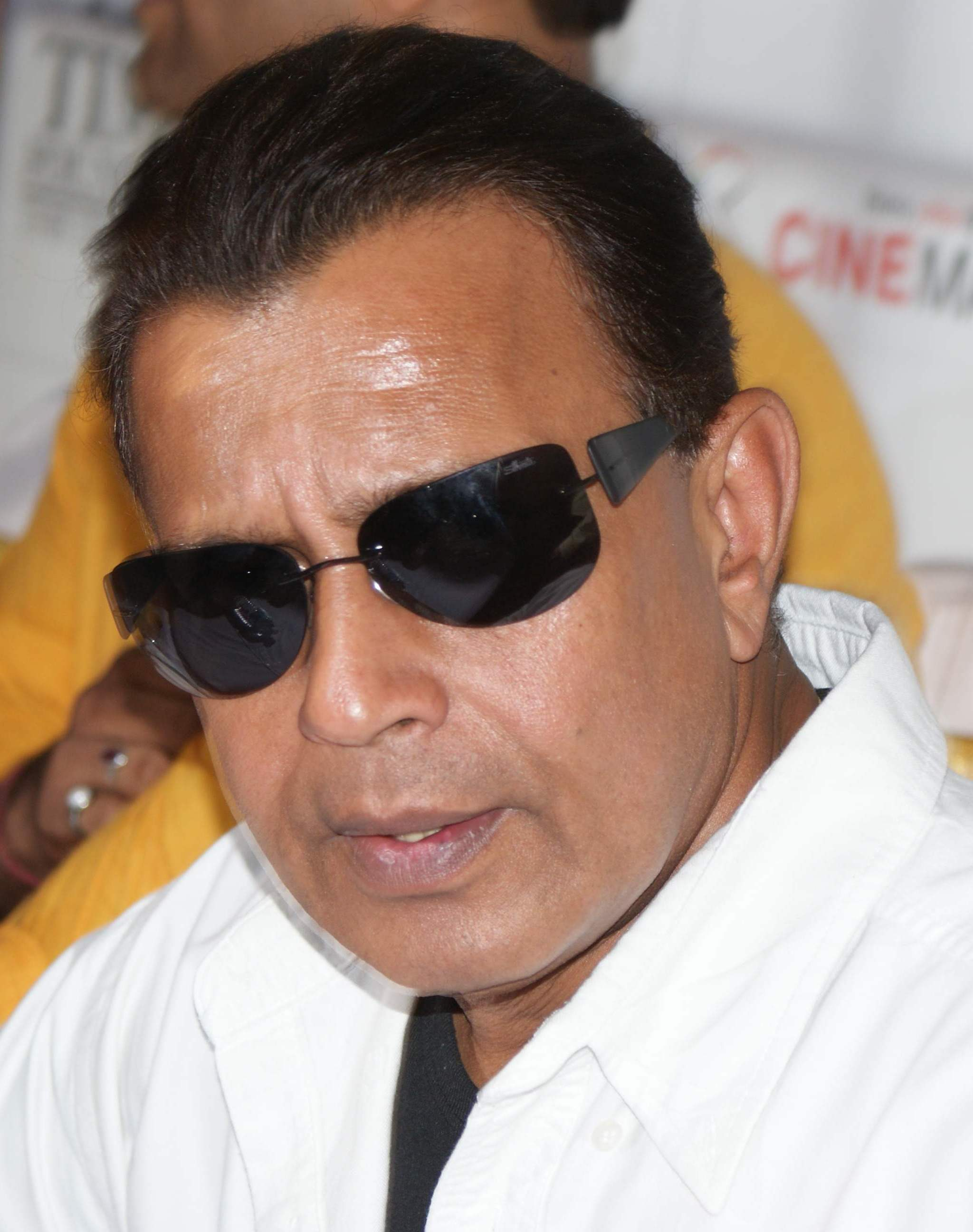
Chakraborty in 2009

Chakraborty married actress Helena Luke in 1979. Four months later, the couple separated and filed for a divorce. He then married actress Yogeeta Bali in 1979.

Chakraborty and Yogeeta have four children: Mimoh, Ushmey, Namashi, and an adopted daughter Dishani. In the 1980s, he was romantically linked to the actress Sridevi, whom he met on the sets of Jaag Utha Insan, and it was rumoured that the two were married. However, when Chakraborty refused to leave his wife Yogeeta Bali, Sridevi ended the romance.

On 10 February 2024, Chakraborty was hospitalised after complaining of chest pain, and it was determined that he had suffered a stroke. He was discharged two days later.

== Legacy ==
Chakraborty is regarded as one of the most popular and successful actors in Indian cinema. Known for his work in both commercial and art-house films, he holds the record of being the only actor to win National Award for Best Actor for his debut film. During the late 1980s and early 1990s, he became one of the most commercially successful stars of action film, as his films consistently performed well at smaller centres despite critical disapproval. He is also considered one of the best "dancing-heroes" in Bollywood, and is notable for his popular "Disco and Desi" fusion-style dancing.

For 50 years, Raj Kapoor was the only Indian film icon in Russia after his films like Awaara and Shree 420 made a significant impact in the country, but after the success of Disco Dancer, Mithun also created "a big craze" in nation.

One of the highest paid actors from the 1980s to the early 1990s, Chakraborty appeared in Box Office India's "Top Actors" list four times from 1985 to 1988.

In 2022, Chakraborty was featured in Outlook India's "75 Best Bollywood Actors" list.

== In popular culture ==
- The title character of the comic book Jimmy Zhingchak is a parody of Mithun Chakraborty.
- The 2010 film Golmaal 3 also parodies Chakraborty's film career as a dancing star. The film even has the songs "Disco Dancer" and "Yaad Aa Raha Hai" which were in the film Disco Dancer.
- In the 2011 film Delhi Belly, Aamir Khan parodies Chakraborty in the song "I Hate You (Like I Love You)" dressed as "Disco Fighter".
- In 2010, Guinea-Bissau issued a postal stamp in Mithun Chakraborty's honour.

=== Books on Mithun Chakraborty ===
Book	Language	Author	Notes
Amar Nayikara	Bengali	Sumit Dey	Mithun Chakraborty the cinema actor and his heroines.
Ananya Mithun	Bengali	Suman Gupta	Biography of Mithun Chakraborty
Mithuner Katha	Bengali	Jayanta Ghosh	
Cinemay Naamte Hole	Bengali	Mithun Chakraborty	Mithun Chakraborty answering questions to his fans
Marbo Ekhane Lash Porbe Shoshane	Bengali	Ashishtaru Mukhaphadya	Life story of Mithun Chakraborty
Arun Kumar Rav	Hindi / Bhojpuri	Himself	Mithun Chakraborty answering questions of his fans
Leave Disco Dancer Alone	English	Sudha Rajagopalan	Book about Mithun Chakraborty and Soviet Union cinema.
Mithun Chakraborty: The Dada of Bollywood	English	Ram Kamal Mukherjee	Biographical book about Mithun Chakraborty
Tribute To Mithun Chakraborty	English	Sara Johnson	A tribute to Mithun Chakraborty. The book is independently published by American writer Sara Johnson.
