= Rambo Rajkumar =

Indian stunt director and action choreographer

- Born: 21 October 1956; Tamil Nadu, India
- Died: April 26, 2009 (aged 52)
- Occupations: action choreographer, stunt coordinator
- Years active: 1986-2009

Rambo Rajkumar, born Rajkumar (21 October 1956 – 26 April 2009), was an Indian stunt director and action choreographer. He was the son of T.K.Paramasivam, who himself was in the stunt department. Rajkumar was a very highly respected stunt director and has worked in more than 500 films in all Indian languages and is known for his close association with actor Mithun Chakraborty. His posthumous release were the films Aayirathil Oruvan and Aadukalam.

Rajkumar earned the prefix 'Rambo' because of his style of realistic close combat scenes, which resembled Sylvester Stallone's style in the movie, Rambo. Top stunt masters like Kanal Kannan, Stun Siva, Anal Arasu, Peter Hein, Stunt Silva, Thalapathy Dinesh, Jaguar Thangam, Action Prakash, Supreme Sundar & Ram Laxman have worked as either stuntmen or stunt assistants to him.

On 26 April 2009, while filming for Kurradu a Telugu remake of the Tamil movie Polladhavan in Hyderabad, Rajkumar suffered from a heart attack and died later that day.

Rajkumar has a son and two daughters. His eldest son Navakant Rambo Rajkumar is an associate stunt director and short film maker. His second daughter R.K Navalakshmi is a radio jockey and his youngest daughter R.K.Navadevi is a costume designer in the film industry. Both the sisters have choreographed dance sequences in director Anurag Kashyap films Mukkabaaz and manmarziyaan

A film directed by actor/director Prabhu deva starring actor Shahid Kapoor released in 2013, R... Rajkumar was first named as Rambo Rajkumar but the name was later changed owing to copyright issues.

== Filmography ==
- 1987 Neram Nalla Irukku
- 1987 Arul Tharum Ayyappan
- 1988 Rayilukku Neramachu
- 1989 Koyil Mani Osai
- 1988 Enga Ooru Kavalkaran
- 1989 Enne Petha Raasa
- 1989 Manasukketha Maharasa
- 1989 Raaja Raajathan
- 1989 Anbu Kattalai
- 1989 Paandi Nattu Thangam
- 1990 Paattali Magan
- 1990 Jagathalaprathapan
- 1990 Thangathin Thangam
- 1990 Pachai Kodi
- 1990 Periya Veetu Pannakkaran
- 1990 Chilambu
- 1990 Maruthu Pandi
- 1990 Periya Idathu Pillai
- 1990 Vellaiya Thevan
- 1990 Naanum Indha Ooruthan
- 1990 Puriyaadha Pudhir
- 1990 Palaivana Paravaigal
- 1990 Periya Idathu Pillai
- 1990 Vellaya Thevan
- 1990 Puthu Paatu
- 1990 Namma Ooru Poovatha
- 1991 Ethir Kaatru
- 1991 Kumbakarai Thangaiah
- 1991 Naadu Adhai Naadu
- 1991 Thambi Oorukku Pudhu
- 1991 Namma Ooru Mariamma
- 1991 Annan Kaattiya Vazhi
- 1991 Mamagaru (Telugu)
- 1991 Thanga Thamaraigal
- 1991 En Rasavin Manasile
- 1991 Enga Oor Sippayi
- 1991 Kaaval Nilayam
- 1991 Nattai Thirudathe
- 1991 Vaidhehi Kalyanam
- 1991 Oorellam Un Pattu
- 1991 Naan Valartha Poove
- 1991 Iravu Suriyan
- 1991 Nenjamundu Nermaiundu
- 1991 Thaalattu Ketkuthamma
- 1991 Thangamana Thangachi
- 1992 Moratodu Naa Mogudu (Telugu)
- 1992 Prema Sikharam (Telugu)
- 1992 Brahmachari
- 1992 Pandithurai
- 1992 Chinna Thayee
- 1992 Agni Paravai
- 1992 Government Mappillai
- 1992 Chinnavar
- 1992 Nadodi Thendral
- 1992 Mondi Mogudu Penki Pellam (Telugu)
- 1992 Nadodi Pattukkaran
- 1992 Unakkaga Piranthen
- 1992 Ponnuketha Purushan
- 1992 Thaali Kattiya Raasa
- 1992 Pudhu Varusham
- 1992 Kottai Vaasal
- 1992 Samundi
- 1992 Chinna Poovai Killadhe
- 1992 David Uncle
- 1992 Solaiyamma
- 1993 Shaktiman (Hindi)
- 1993 Tahqiqaat (Hindi)
- 1993 Khal-Naaikaa (Hindi)
- 1993 Kundan
- 1993 Chinna Mapillai
- 1993 Maamiyar Veedu
- 1993 Madurai Meenakshi
- 1993 Uthama Raasa
- 1993 Thangakkili
- 1993 Sakkarai Devan
- 1993 Karpagam Vandhachu
- 1994 Amaidhi Padai
- 1994 Siragadikka Aasai
- 1994 Doragaariki Donga Pellam (Telugu)
- 1994 Chinna Muthu
- 1994 Cheetah* (Hindi)
- 1994 Janta Ki Adalat (Hindi)
- 1994 En Rajangam
- 1994 Rasa Magan
- 1994 Vandicholai Chinraasu
- 1994 Seevalaperi Pandi
- 1994 Kanmani
- 1994 Thozhar Pandian
- 1994 Ilaignar Ani
- 1994 Veera Padhakkam
- 1994 Anokha Premyudh (Hindi)
- 1995 Khaidi Inspector (Telugu)
- 1995 Ahankaar (Hindi)
- 1995 Zakhmi Sipahi (Hindi)
- 1995 Jallad (Hindi)
- 1995 Maidan-E-Jung (Hindi)
- 1995 Gangai Karai Paattu
- 1995 Engirundho Vandhan
- 1995 Udhavum Karangal
- 1995 Aalu Magalu (Telugu)
- 1995 En Pondatti Nallava
- 1995 Villadhi Villain
- 1995 Thamizhachi
- 1995 Ilavarasi
- 1995 Varraar Sandiyar
- 1995 Maa Manithan
- 1996 Naattuppura Paattu
- 1996 Musthafa
- 1996 Angaara (Hindi)
- 1996 Muqaddar (Hindi)
- 1996 Jurmana (Hindi)
- 1996 Daanveer (Hindi)
- 1997 Inferno (English)
- 1997 Ettupatti Rasa
- 1997 Paasamulla Pandiyare
- 1997 Samrat
- 1997 Jodidar (Hindi)
- 1997 Kaalia (Hindi)
- 1997 Suraj (Hindi)
- 1997 Shapath (Hindi)
- 1997 My India
- 1997 Jeevan Yudh (Hindi)
- 1997 Gundagardi (Hindi)
- 1997 Thambi Durai
- 1998 Veera Thalattu
- 1998 Sher-E-Hindustan (Hindi)
- 1998 Chandaal (Hindi)
- 1998 Hatyara (Hindi)
- 1998 Ustadon Ka Ustad (Hindi)
- 1998 Hitler
- 1998 Do Numbri (Hindi)
- 1998 Yamraaj (Hindi)
- 1998 Zulm-O-Sitam (Hindi)
- 1998 Chandaal (Hindi)
- 1998 Gunda (Hindi)
- 1998 Mard (Hindi)
- 1998 Saazish (Hindi)
- 1998 Mafia Raaj (Hindi)
- 1998 Bhagavath Singh
- 1999 Ganga Ki Kasam (Hindi)
- 1999 Aaag Hi Aag (Hindi)
- 1999 Shera (Hindi)
- 1999 Phool Aur Aag (Hindi)
- 1999 Lal Baadshah (Hindi)
- 1999 Maa Kasam (Hindi)
- 1999 Kummi Paattu
- 2000 Agni Putra (Hindi)
- 2000 Sultaan (Hindi)
- 2000 Karisakattu Poove
- 2000 Puratchikkaaran
- 2000 Doubles
- 2000 Kannaal Peasava
- 2000 Manuneedhi
- 2001 Ninaikkatha Naalillai
- 2001 Baghaawat Ek Jung (Hindi)
- 2001 Jeetenge Hum (Hindi)
- 2002 Mawali No.1 (Hindi)
- 2002 Thulluvadho Ilamai
- 2003 Kadhal Kondein
- 2003 Kovilpatti Veeralakshmi
- 2003 Kadhal Kirukkan
- 2004 Barood (Hindi)
- 2004 Sound Party
- 2004 Dreams
- 2005 Adhu Oru Kana Kaalam
- 2005 Devdoot
- 2005 Chita (Bengali)
- 2006 Pudhupettai
- 2007 Cheena Thaana 001
- 2007 Polladhavan
- 2007 Mirugam
- 2008 Theekuchi
- 2008 Indira Vizha
- 2009 Kurradu (Telugu)
- 2010 Aayirathil Oruvan
- 2011 Aadukalam

== Actor ==
- 1988 Enga Ooru Kavalkaran
- 1989 Enne Petha Raasa
- 1989 Paandi Nattu Thangam
- 1990 Thangathin Thangam
- 1990 Periya Veetu Pannakkaran
- 1990 Naanum Indha Ooruthan
- 1991 En Rasavin Manasile
- 1992 Ponnuketha Purushan
- 1992 Moratodu Naa Mogudu (Telugu)
- 1994 Amaidhi Padai
- 1998 Chandaal (Hindi)
- 2000 Manu Needhi
- 2003 Kadhal Kondein
- 2003 Kovilpatti Veeralakshmi
- 2011 Aaranya Kaandam
