= Mithun's Dream Factory =

Indian film studio

Mithun's Dream Factory is an Indian film studio based in Ooty. Mithun Chakraborty left the Mumbai based film industry in the early 1990s as he shifted his base to Ooty to concentrate on his hotel business. He set up the hotel Monarch in Ooty and chose to act only in films which were shot at Ooty and nearby locales. This strategy paid off as the film crew could stay in his hotel, the Monarch, for discounted rates, and complete the film in a single schedule.

Chakraborty's limited budget movies soon started flowing, as every month saw a Chakraborty release. These movies were profitable, but were often ignored by critics and were categorized as B movies (low-budget films). He paid more tax than anyone else in the Bollywood film industry in the country between 1995 and 1999.

Chakraborty also holds the record of appearing in the highest number of Hindi films as hero (over 250 films).

== Selected filmography ==
1993
Aadmi
Dalaal
Jeevan Ki Shatranj
Phool Aur Angaar
Krishan Avtaar
Meherbaan
Pardesi

1994
Paramaatma
Kranti Kshetra
Cheetah
Janta Ki Adalat
Naaraaz
Teesra Kaun
Yaar Gaddar

1995
Ravan Raaj: A True Story
Zakhmi Sipahi
Nishana
Jallaad
Ahankaar
Ab Insaf Hoga
Gunehgar
The Don
Bhagya Debata
Diya Aur Toofan

1996
Nirbhay
Muqaddar
Jurmana
Bhishma
Daanveer
Apne Dam Par
Angaara
Jung

1997
Shapath
Jodidar
Loha
Kaalia
Daadagiri
Suraj
Jeevan Yudh
Jiban Yuddha
Krantikari

1998
Sher-E-Hindustan
Saazish
Military Raaj
Chandaal
Hatyara
Ustadon Ke Ustad
Hitler
Devta
Mard
Hatyara
Do Numbri
Yamraaj
Pyasi Aatma
Himmatwala
Gunda
Mafia Raaj

1999
Heeralal Pannalal
Sikandar Sadak Ka
Kahani Kismat Ki
Ganga Ki Kasam
Maa Kasam
Sautela
Sanyasi Mera Naam
Benaam
Aaya Toofan
Aaag Hi Aag
Shera
Phool Aur Aag
Tabaahi-The Destroyer
Dada

2000
Qurbaniyaan
Sultaan
Jwalamukhi
Billa No. 786
Aaj Ka Ravan
Kaali Topi Laal Rumaal
Sabse Bada Beiman
Justice Chowdhary
Agniputra

2001
Bhairav
Bengal Tiger
Meri Pyaari Bahania Banegi Dulhania
Arjun Devaa
Meri Adalat
Khatron Ke Khiladi
Baghaawat – Ek Jung
Zahreela

2002
Marshal
Mawali No.1
Bangali Babu
Qaidi
Sabse Badkar Hum
Gautam Govinda
Meri Partigya

2003
Chaalbaaz
Guru
Santrash
Rasta

2004
Barood

2005
Devdoot
Arjun Rickshawala
Qatal-E-Aam
Chita
Shaktimaan
Dada

2006
Insaaf Ki Jung
Hungama

2008
Aaj Ka Boss

2009
Dushmani

== Snippets ==
Anupama Chopra wrote an article for India Today in which Chakraborty is referred as "The B movies (low-budget) King". SCREEN Weekly carried a cover story calling him "Mithun - The Miracle Man", both covering the Ooty-based film production phenomenon. Outlook Magazine mentioned the same. Filmfare Magazine in May 1998 published the same phenomenon under the title "Believe it or not... The unusually - safe suthri story of Mithun Chakraborty". Rediff addressed Chakraborty as "That indefatigable Movie Machine".

Director T L V Prasad made more than 25 Chakraborty films.
