= List of Hindi films of 1998 =

A list of films produced by the Bollywood film industry based in Mumbai in 1998:

== Highest-grossing films ==
No.	Title	Director	Producer	Gross
1	Kuch Kuch Hota Hai	Karan Johar	Dharma Productions	₹107 crore
2	Soldier	Abbas–Mustan	Tips Industries	₹38.88 crore
3	Pyaar To Hona Hi Tha	Anees Bazmee	Baba Films	₹38.27 crore
4	Bade Miyan Chote Miyan	David Dhawan	Pooja Entertainment	₹35.21 crore
5	Pyaar Kiya To Darna Kya	Sohail Khan	Gurmeet & Sohail Productions; Pooja Entertainment	₹33.36 crore
6	Dil Se..	Mani Ratnam	Madras Talkies; Varma Corporation	₹28.26 crore
7	Ghulam	Vikram Bhatt	Vishesh Films	₹24.2 crore
8	Major Saab	Tinnu Anand	Amitabh Bachchan Corporation	₹23.21 crore
9	Dulhe Raja	Harmesh Malhotra	Eastern Films	₹22.49 crore
10	China Gate	Rajkumar Santoshi	Santoshi Productions	₹22.30 crore
11	Jab Pyaar Kisise Hota Hai	Deepak Sareen	Kumar S. Taurani, Ramesh S.Taurani	₹21.96 crore
12	Duplicate	Mahesh Bhatt	Mukesh Bhatt	₹21.49 crore
13	Zor	Sangeeth Sivan	Vivek Kumar	₹18.59 crore
14	Salaakhen	Rajkumar Santoshi	Santoshi Productions	₹18.58 crore
15	Zakhm	Mahesh Bhatt	Mukesh Bhatt	₹18.04 crore

== List of released films ==
Title	Director	Cast	Genre
2001: Do Hazaar Ek	Raj N. Sippy	Jackie Shroff, Rajat Bedi, Dimple Kapadia, Tabu	Crime, Drama, Mystery
Aakrosh	Lateef Binny	Sunil Shetty, Shilpa Shetty, Johnny Lever	Action, Crime, Drama, Thriller
Achanak	Naresh Malhotra	Govinda, Manisha Koirala, Paresh Rawal	Drama
Angaaray	Mahesh Bhatt	Akshay Kumar, Nagarjuna, Pooja Bhatt	Action
Aunty No. 1	Kirti Kumar	Govinda, Raveena Tandon, Kader Khan, Harish Kumar	Comedy
Bada Din	Anjan Dutt	Marc Robinson, Shabana Azmi, Tara Deshpande	Drama, Romance
Bade Miyan Chote Miyan	David Dhawan	Amitabh Bachchan, Govinda, Raveena Tandon, Ramya Krishnan, Paresh Rawal	Comedy
Badmaash	Goutam Pawar	Jackie Shroff, Shilpa Shirodkar, Pran	Action
Bandhan	Murali Mohan	Salman Khan, Rambha, Ashwini Bhave, Jackie Shroff, Shakti Kapoor	Action
Barood	Pramod Chakravorty	Akshay Kumar, Raveena Tandon, Mohnish Bahl, Amrish Puri, Gulshan Grover	Action
Bombay Boys	Kaizad Gustad	Naveen Andrews, Rahul Bose, Alexander Gifford, Tara Deshpande	Comedy
Chandaal	T. L. V. Prasad	Mithun Chakraborty, Sneha, Avtar Gill	Action
China Gate	Rajkumar Santoshi	Samir Soni, Mamta Kulkarni, Amrish Puri, Om Puri, Nasseruddin Shah, Danny Denzongpa	Social, War, Action
Chhota Chetan	Jijo Punnoose	Urmila Matondkar, Dalip Tahil, Satish Kaushik	Fantasy
Dand Nayak	Sikander Bharti	Manek Bedi, Ayesha Jhulka, Bharat Kapoor	Action
Deewana Hoon Pagal Nahi		Ayesha Jhulka, Vikas Bhalla	
Devta	Jagdish A. Sharma	Mithun Chakraborty, Aditya Pancholi, Payal Malhotra	Action
Dil Se..	Mani Ratnam	Shah Rukh Khan, Manisha Koirala, Preity Zinta, Arundhati Nag, Zohra Sehgal	Drama
Do Numbri	T. L. V. Prasad	Mithun Chakraborty, Sneha	Action
Doli Saja Ke Rakhna	Priyadarshan	Akshaye Khanna, Jyothika	Romance, Drama
Dulhe Raja	Harmesh Malhotra	Govinda, Raveena Tandon	Comedy
Duplicate	Mahesh Bhatt	Shah Rukh Khan, Juhi Chawla, Sonali Bendre, Gulshan Grover, Farida Jalal	Comedy
Dushman	Tanuja Chandra	Kajol, Sanjay Dutt, Ashutosh Rana	Thriller
1947 Earth	Deepa Mehta	Aamir Khan, Rahul Khanna, Nandita Das	Historical Drama
Ehsaas is Tarah	Gurman Juggal	Kirpal Pandit, Sonia Saran	Drama
Ek Tha Dil Ek Thi Dhadkan	Shahrukh Sultan	Biswajeet, Rajendra Kumar, Isha Koppikar	Romance
Ghar Bazar	D. S. Azad	Mumtaz Begum, Shail Chaturvedi, Gulshan Grover	Action, Crime, Drama
Gharwali Baharwali	David Dhawan	Anil Kapoor, Raveena Tandon, Rambha	Comedy
Ghulam	Vikram Bhatt	Aamir Khan, Rani Mukerji, Ashutosh Rana, Sharat Saxena, Deepak Tijori, Akshay Anand	Action, Drama
Gunda	Kanti Shah	Mithun Chakraborty, Verna Raj, Ishrat Ali	Action, Comedy
Hafta Vasuli	Deepak Balraj Vij	Jackie Shroff, Aditya Pancholi, Ayub Khan	
Hatya Kaand	Girish Manukant	Prem Chopra, Deepak Parashar	Action Thriller
Hatyara	T. L. V. Prasad	Mithun Chakraborty, Suman Ranganathan	Crime Drama
Hazaar Chaurasi Ki Maa	Govind Nihalani	Jaya Bachchan, Anupam Kher	Drama
Hero Hindustani	Aziz Sejawal	Arshad Warsi, Namrata Shirodkar, Parmeet Sethi, Kader Khan	Romance
Himmatwala	Jayant Gillator	Mithun Chakraborty, Ayesha Jhulka	Action
Hitler	T. L. V. Prasad	Mithun Chakraborty, Shilpa Shirodkar, Deepti Bhatnagar	Action
Humse Badhkar Kaun	Deepak Anand	Sunil Shetty, Saif Ali Khan, Sonali Bendre	Action, Comedy
Hyderabad Blues	Nagesh Kukunoor	Nagesh Kukunoor, Rajashree	Drama
Iski Topi Uske Sarr	Raju Mavani	Sharad Kapoor, Mukul Dev, Divya Dutta, Prem Chopra	Action, Crime, Drama
Jaane Jigar	Arshad Khan, Talat Jani	Jackie Shroff, Ayub Khan, Mamta Kulkarni	Comedy, Drama, Family
Jab Pyaar Kisise Hota Hai	Deepak Sareen	Salman Khan, Twinkle Khanna	Drama
Jhooth Bole Kauwa Kaate	Hrishikesh Mukherjee	Anil Kapoor, Juhi Chawla, Anupam Kher, Amrish Puri	Drama, Comedy, Family, Romance
Kabhi Na Kabhi	Priyadarshan	Jackie Shroff, Anil Kapoor, Pooja Bhatt	Action, Crime, Romance
Kareeb	Vidhu Vinod Chopra	Bobby Deol, Neha	Romance, Drama
Keemat – They Are Back	Sameer Malkan	Akshay Kumar, Saif Ali Khan, Sonali Bendre, Raveena Tandon	Action
Khofnak Mahal	Sushil Vyas	Raza Murad, Pramod Moutho, Usha Khanna	Horror
Khote Sikkey	Partho Ghosh	Ayub Khan, Madhoo, Atul Agnihotri	Crime
Kuch Kuch Hota Hai	Karan Johar	Shah Rukh Khan, Kajol, Rani Mukerji, Salman Khan	Drama, Romance, Comedy, Musical
Kudrat		Aruna Irani, Kader Khan, Akshaye Khanna	Action, Romance
Laash	K. Mansukhini	Yunus Parvez, Lalita Pawar, Shakti Kapoor	Horror
Mafia Raaj	Yeshwantt	Mithun Chakraborty, Ayesha Jhulka, Shakti Kapoor	Action
Maharaja	Anil Sharma	Govinda, Manisha Koirala, Raj Babbar	Drama
Main Solah Baras Ki	Dev Anand	Dev Anand, Sabrina-Shaista Usta	Drama
Major Saab	Tinnu Anand	Amitabh Bachchan, Ajay Devgn, Sonali Bendre	Action, Drama, Romance
Mard	Ganpati Bohra	Mithun Chakraborty, Gulshan Grover, Ravali	Action
Mehndi	Hamid Ali Khan	Rani Mukerji, Faraaz Khan	Drama
Mere Do Anmol Ratan	K. Ravi Shankar	Arshad Warsi, Namrata Shirodkar, Mukul Dev, Reema Lagoo	Drama
Military Raaj	Sanjay Sharma	Mithun Chakraborty, Pratibha Sinha, Pooja Bedi, Aditya Pancholi	Action
Miss 420	Akashdeep	Baba Sehgal, Sheeba	Romance
Mohabbat Aur Jung	Hameed Alam	Aparajita, Mohnish Bahl, Rakesh Bedi	Action
Pardesi Babu	Manoj Agrawal	Govinda, Raveena Tandon, Shilpa Shetty	Action, Comedy, Drama
Prem Aggan	Feroz Khan	Fardeen Khan, Meghna Kothari, Sameer Malhotra	Romance
Purani Kabar	K. L. Seikh	Mohan Joshi, Harish Patel, Kiran Kumar	Drama
Pyaar Kiya To Darna Kya	Sohail Khan	Salman Khan, Kajol, Arbaaz Khan, Dharmendra	Comedy, Romance
Pyaar To Hona Hi Tha	Anees Bazmee	Ajay Devgn, Kajol, Kashmera Shah	Romance
Pyasi Aatma	P. Chandrakumar	Prithvi, Mithun Chakraborty	Horror
Pyasi Chudail	P. Chandrakumar	Ravi, Radha Ravi, Kasthuri Shankar	Horror
Qila	Umesh Mehra	Dilip Kumar, Rekha, Mukul Dev, Mamta Kulkarni	Thriller
Saat Rang Ke Sapne	Priyadarshan	Arvind Swamy, Juhi Chawla	Drama, Romance
Saaz	Sai Paranjpye	Shabana Azmi, Zakir Hussain, Aruna Irani	Drama
Saazish	Sudhir R. Nair	Mithun Chakraborty, Pooja Batra	Action
Salaakhen	Guddu Dhanoa	Sunny Deol, Raveena Tandon, Amrish Puri	Action
Sar Utha Ke Jiyo	Sikander Bharti	Naseeruddin Shah, Madhoo, Manek Bedi	Action, Romance
Satya	Ram Gopal Varma	J. D. Chakravarthy, Urmila Matondkar, Manoj Bajpayee	Action
Sham Ghansham	Ashok Ghai	Raakhee Gulzar, Chandrachur Singh, Arbaaz Khan	Drama
Sher-E-Hindustan	T. L. V. Prasad	Mithun Chakraborty, Sanghavi	Action
Soldier	Abbas–Mustan	Bobby Deol, Preity Zinta	Romance, Action, Thriller
Swami Vivekananda	G. V. Iyer	Sarvadarman D. Banerjee, Mithun Chakraborty	Biography
Tirchhi Topiwale	Nadeem Khan	Inder Kumar, Chunky Pandey, Monica Bedi	Comedy, Drama
Train To Pakistan	Pamela Rooks	Nirmal Pandey, Rajit Kapur, Divya Dutta	Drama, War
Ustadon Ke Ustad	T. L. V. Prasad	Mithun Chakraborty, Jackie Shroff, Madhoo	Action
Vinashak – Destroyer	Ravi Deewan	Sunil Shetty, Raveena Tandon	Action
Wajood	N. Chandra	Madhuri Dixit, Nana Patekar, Ramya Krishnan, Mukul Dev	Drama
Yamraaj	Rajiv Babbar	Mithun Chakraborty, Jackie Shroff, Sneha, Mink Singh	Action
Yugpurush	Partho Ghosh	Nana Patekar, Jackie Shroff, Manisha Koirala	Drama
Zakhm	Mahesh Bhatt	Ajay Devgn, Sonali Bendre, Pooja Bhatt, Nagarjuna	Nadeem-Shravan
Zanjeer	Yusuf Bhat	Aditya Pancholi, Sakshi Shivanand, Monica Bedi, Shakti Kapoor, Satish Kaul	Action
Zor	Sangeeth Sivan	Sunny Deol, Sushmita Sen, Milind Gunaji	Action, Crime, Drama
Zulm-O-Sitam	K. C. Bokadia	Dharmendra, Shatrughan Sinha, Jaya Prada, Mahesh Anand, Vikas Anand, Kishore Anand Bhanushali	Action

== See also ==
- List of Hindi films of 1999
- List of Hindi films of 1997
