= List of Telugu films of 1984 =

This is a list of films produced by the Tollywood (Telugu language film industry) based in Hyderabad in the year 1984.

== Top grossing films ==
- Srimadvirat Veerabrahmendra Swami Charitra
- Bobbili Brahmanna
- Mangammagari Manavadu
- Bava Maradallu
- Challenge

== List of released films ==
Title	Director	Cast	Genre	Music	Release
Aadadhi Visirina Savaal	K. S. R. Das (Screenplay/Direction)	Vijayalalitha, Murali Mohan, Vijayasanthi, Ramakrishna, Dr. M. Prabhakar Reddy		Chakravarthy	31 August 1983
Abhimanyudu	Dasari Narayana Rao	Shoban Babu, Radhika, Vijayashanti, Somayajulu	Action	K. V. Mahadevan	
Adarshavanthudu	Kodi Ramakrishna	Akkineni Nageswara Rao, Radha	Drama		
Agni Gundam	Kranthi Kumar	Chiranjeevi, Sumalatha, Sujatha		Chakravarthy	
Allullostunnaru	K. Vasu	Chandra Mohan, Chiranjeevi, Sulakshana, Geetha	Romance, Drama		
Ananda Bhairavi	Jandhyala	Girish Karnad, J. V. Ramana Murthy	Dance Drama	Ramesh Naidu	19 April 1984
Anubandham	A. Kodandarami Reddy	Akkineni Nageswara Rao, Sujatha, Karthik, Radhika	Drama	Chakravarthy	
Bava Maradallu	A. Kodandarami Reddy	Shoban Babu, Suhasini, Radhika		Chakravarthy	
Bhagyalakshmi	Kommineni Seshagiri Rao Dialogues: Gollapudi	Murali Mohan, Saritha, Gollapudi (Dual Role), Kanta Rao, Nagesh, Krishnaveni, Anitha, Pushpakumari, Kakinada Syamala, Narayana Murthy		M. S. Viswanathan	16 June 1984
Bobbili Brahmanna	K. Raghavendra Rao	Krishnam Raju, Sharada, Jayasudha	Action		
Challenge	A. Kodandarami Reddy	Chiranjeevi, Suhasini, Vijayashanti, Rao Gopal Rao	Drama	Ilaiyaraaja	
Dandayatra	K. Bapayya	Sobhan Babu, Jayasudha, Rao Gopal Rao	Action	Chakravarthy	
Devalayam	T. Krishna	Shoban Babu, Vijayashanti		Chakravarthy	
Devanthakudu	S. A. Chandrasekhar	Chiranjeevi, Vijayashanti, Narayana Rao	Action	Chakravarthy	
Disco King	T. L. V. Prasad	Balakrishna, Tulasi, Jaggayya	Drama		
Dongalu Baboi Dongalu	K. S. R. Das	Krishna, Radha, Suhasini Maniratnam	Action		
Goonda	A. Kodandarami Reddy	Chiranjeevi, Radha, Satyanarayana Kaikala	Drama	Chakravarthy	
Gruhalakshmi	B. Bhaskara Rao	Mohan Babu, Bhanupriya, Radhika		Satyam	
Hero	Vijaya Bapineedu	Chiranjeevi, Radhika, Rao Gopal Rao	Action	Chakravarthy	
Illalu Priyuralu	A. Kodandarami Reddy	Sobhan Babu, Suhasini Maniratnam	Drama		
Inti Guttu	K. Bapaiah	Chiranjeevi, Nalini, Suhasini		Chakravarthy	
Jagan	Dasari Narayana Rao	Sobhan Babu, Jayasudha, Sumalatha	Action		
Janam Manam	Mohan Das	Madhala Ranga Rao, Gummadi, Prabha, Lakshmi Chitra,		Chakravarthy	15 August 1984
Janani Janmabhoomi	K. Vishwanath	Nandamuri Balakrishna, Sumalatha, Gollapudi	Philosophical	K. V. Mahadevan	
Justice Chakravarthy	Dasari Narayana Rao	ANR, Jayasudha, Sumalatha	Legal Drama		
Kanchana Ganga	V. Madhusudhan Rao	Chandra Mohan, Saritha, Swapna, Prathap Pothan	Romance, Drama	Chakravarthy	
Kanchu Kagada	A. Kodandarami Reddy	Krishna, Sridevi	Action, Romance	Chakravarthy	28 September 1984
Kathanayakudu	K. Muralimohana Rao	Nandamuri Balakrishna, Vijayashanti, Chandra Mohan, Sharada		Chakravarthy	
Koteeswarudu	Kommineni Seshagiri Rao	ANR, Sujatha	Action		6 January 1984
Kotha Dampathulu					24 August 1984
Kurra Cheshtalu					26 July 1984
Kurukshetramlo Sita	B. V. Prasad	Mohan Babu, Murali Mohan, Gollapudi, Ambika, Jayasudha, Raja Sulochana		Ramesh Naidu	22 June 1984
Kutumba Gowaravam					9 November 1984
Mahanagaramlo Mayagadu	Vijaya Bapineedu	Chiranjeevi, Vijayashanti, Allu Ramalingaiah	Action	Chakravarthy	
Manasa Veena	Rama Arankanna	Rajkumar, Revathi, Sumithra		M. S. Viswanathan	
Mangammagari Manavadu	Kodi Ramakrishna	Nandamuri Balakrishna, Suhasini, Bhanumathi	Drama	K. V. Mahadevan	
Mayuri	Singeetham Srinivasa Rao	Sudha Chandran, P. L. Narayana, Nirmalamma	Biographical	S. P. Balasubrahmanyam	
Merupu Daadi	P. N. Ramachandra Rao	Suman, Bhanu Chander, Ranganath			
Naagu	Tatineni Prasad	Chiranjeevi, Radha, Jaggayya	Drama		
Nava Mohini	B. Vittalacharya	Narasimha Raju, Rohini		Parthasarathy	
Nayakulaku Saval	K. S. R. Das	Krishna, Jaya Prada, Sumalatha	Action		
Palnati Puli	Tatineni Prasad	Nandamuri Balakrishna, Bhanupriya	Action		
Rachayitri					
Raga Bandham					
Railu Dopidi	K. S. Reddy	Prabha, Vijaya Lalitha, Bhanuchandar, Jayamalini,		Raja	11 May 1984
Rajahmundry Rome	K. V. S. Prasad Reddy	Raj Babu, Deepa, Devika, Sarath Babu	Crime Thriller	Ilaiyaraaja	14 December 1984
Raktha Sambandham	Vijaya Nirmala	Krishna, Radha, Jayanthi		Chakravarthy	
Rana	Dasari Narayana Rao	Shoban Babu, Radhika, Vijayashanti, Somayajulu		Chakravarthy	
Raraju	G. Rammohan Rao	Krishnam Raju, Vijayashanti, Sharada			
Rojulu Marayi	Satyanarayana Vejella	Sivakrishna, Gummadi Venkateswara Rao, Prabha, Rajyalakshmi, Rajeswari, Dr. Siva Prasad, Nutan Prasad, P. L. Narayana, Rajendra Prasad, Kiran Babu, Vallam Narasimha Rao, etc.		Sivakrishna	12 May 1984
Rowdy	A. Mohan Gandhi	Krishnam Raju, Radha, Bhanupriya		Chakravarthy	
Rustum	A. Kodandarami Reddy	Chiranjeevi, Urvashi, Rao Gopal Rao	Action	Chakravarthy	
S. P. Bhayankar	V. B. Rajendra Prasad	ANR, Krishnam Raju, Sridevi, Vijayashanti	Thriller		
Sahasame Jeevitham	Bharathi, Vasu	Nandamuri Balakrishna, Vijji	Romance		
Sampoorna Premayanam	N. B. Chakravarthy	Sobhan Babu, Jaya Prada	Romance		
Sangeeta Samrat	Singeetham Srinivasa Rao	ANR, Jaya Prada	Romance		
Seethamma Pelli	Bapu	Mohan Babu, Revathi, Aruna		S. P. Balasubrahmanyam	
Sitaara	Vamsy	Bhanupriya, Suman, Subhalekha Sudhakar	Drama		
Srimadvirat Veerabrahmendra Swami Charitra	N. T. Rama Rao	N. T. Rama Rao, Nandamuri Balakrishna, Kanchana, Prabha	Biographical	Ramesh Naidu	
Srivariki Premalekha	Jandhyala	Naresh, Poornima	Romance, Comedy	Ramesh Naidu	
Swathi	Kranthi Kumar	Suhasini, Bhanu Chander, Sharada	Drama		
Tandava Krishnudu	P. Chandrasekhara Reddy	ANR, Jaya Prada	Drama		
Vasantha Geetam	Singeetham Srinivasa Rao	ANR, Radha	Drama		
Veerabhadrudu	Pinisetti Ravi Raja	Madhala Ranga Rao, Murali, Vijayasanthi, Narra, Jyothi		Ilaiyaraaja	9 March 1984
Yuddham	Dasari Narayana Rao	Krishna, Krishnam Raju	Action	Chakravarthy	

== Dubbed films ==
Opening	Title	Director(s)	Original film		Cast	Ref.
Opening	Title	Director(s)	Title	Language	Cast	Ref.
23 June	Sakala Kala Priyudu	Rama Narayana	Theeradha Vilaiyattu Pillai	Tamil	Mohan, Purnima Jayaram, Silk Smitha	
	Bharya Bharthala Anubandham	B. Maleah	Nanna Devaru - 1982	Kannada	Anath Nag, Ambika, Roopadevi	
22 June	Love Love Love	K. Balachander	Poikkal Kudhirai	Tamil	Viji, Ramakrishna, Vaali, Raveendran	
2 August	Mangalya Mahima	Ashish Kumar	Ganga Sagar	Hindi		
1 December	Sahasa Simham	Dhamodharan N.	Pagadai Panirendu	Tamil	Kamal Haasan, Sripriya, Y. G. Mahendra	
14 December	Tiger Rajani	K. Balachander	Agni Sakshi	Tamil	Rajinikanth, Saritha	
28 December	Murder	Joshiy	Alakadalinakkare	Malayalam		
