= I Love You (1992 film) =

- Poster
- Directed by: Vara Prasad
- Story by: Radha Bharathi
- Based on: Vaigasi Poranthachu (Tamil)
- Produced by: Iqbal Khan; Pravin Shah
- Starring: Prashanth; Sabah
- Music by: Raamlaxman
- Release date: 14 February 1992
- Running time: 142 minutes
- Country: India
- Language: Hindi

I Love You is a 1992 Indian Hindi-language romantic drama film directed by Vara Prasad. The film stars Prashanth and Sabah. The supporting cast includes Tanuja, Amrish Puri, and Charan Raj. It is a remake of the Tamil film Vaigasi Poranthachu (1990) which also starred Prashanth. This is the Bollywood debut of Tamil actor Prashanth.

== Cast ==
- Prashanth as Kishan
- Sabah as Radha
- Tanuja as Parvati
- Reema Lagoo as Laxmi
- Beena Banerjee
- Guddi Maruti as Kamla
- Laxmikant Berde as Champak
- Asrani as Teacher
- Mukri as Principal
- Ashok Saraf as Daulatram
- Amrish Puri as Gajendra Singh
- Charan Raj as Maan Singh

== Soundtrack ==
Song	Singer
"Kaash Koi Meri"	Lata Mangeshkar
"Jai Ambe"	S. P. Balasubrahmanyam
"Bombay Ho"	S. P. Balasubrahmanyam
"Tum Vaise Hi"	S. P. Balasubrahmanyam
"Tu Mere Aage"	S. P. Balasubrahmanyam, Lata Mangeshkar
"Dil Kho Gaya, Kya Ho Gaya"	S. P. Balasubrahmanyam, Lata Mangeshkar
"Sunday Ko Bulaya"	S. P. Balasubrahmanyam, Lata Mangeshkar
"Chahe Kitna Bhi Dantiye"	S. P. Balasubrahmanyam, Poornima
"Sridevi Hema Laage Tu, Madhuri Rekha Laage Tu"	S. P. Balasubrahmanyam, Udit Narayan, Sudesh Bhosle, Mangal Singh
"O Mairi"	Sukhwinder Singh
"O Mairi" (Sad)	Sukhwinder Singh
