= Jack Gaud =

Indian actor (born 1958)

- Born: 1958; Khetri, Rajasthan, India
- Died: 8 June 2000 (aged 41–42); Mumbai, Maharashtra, India
- Occupations: Actor; Film producer; Military personnel
- Years active: 1984–2000
- Military career
- Allegiance: India
- Branch: Indian Navy
- Service years: 1977–1984
- Rank: Captain

Jack Gaud (1958 – 8 June 2000) was an Indian actor, film producer and military personnel known mostly for portrayal of negative roles in Hindi cinema. He started acting after leaving the Indian Navy.

Gaud did minor roles, especially as a criminal or the leading villain's henchman in several Hindi films. He is best known for Karan Arjun, and Vaastav. His last film appearance was in Khuda Kasam.

== Personal life ==
Jack Gaud was born in Shimla Village, Khetri in Rajasthan in 1958. He joined the Indian Navy and was a professional body builder, representing the Indian Navy in competitions. He also held the "Mr. Bombay" title (in either 82 or 83). He always wanted to become an actor. He joined the film industry in the year 1984 after he left the Indian Navy. He died of a heart attack at the age of 42 in 2000.

== Filmography ==
Year	Title	Role	Notes
2010	Khuda Kasam	Goon who abducts Hussain's sister	Posthumous release
2002	Hathyar	Fracture Bandya	Only Photo in Photo frame
2001	One 2 Ka 4	Terrorist at shopping mall	
2001	Bhairav	R.S. Jindal's henchman	
2001	Rupa Rani Ramkali		
2000	Kaali Ki Saugandh		
2000	Baaghi	Gogi Pathan	
2000	Justice Chowdhary	Inspector Kadam	
2000	Jwalamukhi	Vinkantesh	
2000	Sultaan	Jay Shankar	
2000	The Revenge: Geeta Mera Naam	Vikram	
1999	Vaastav: The Reality	Fracture Bandya	
1999	Kartoos	Jagat's assistant	
1999	Lal Baadshah	Jabbar Singh	special appearance
1999	Ganga Ki Kasam	Bhim singh	
1999	Dada	Ranjit	
1999	Kaala Samrajya	Kaalkeshwar's employee	
1998	Ustadon Ke Ustad	Mahadevan’s nephew	
1998	Bade Miyan Chote Miyan	punk with mustache	
1998	Yamraaj	Rampal	
1998	Chandaal	Jack	
1998	Phool Bane Patthar	Tiger	
1998	Sher Khan		
1998	Purani Kabar	Demon	
1998	Do Numbri	Mera	
1997	Mr. and Mrs. Khiladi		
1997	Do Ankhen Barah Hath		
1997	Koyla	Ranbir	
1997	Judwaa	Tony	
1996	Ek Tha Raja		
1996	Shastra	Sonia's Brother	
1996	Saajan Chale Sasural	Jack, a boxer	
1996	Zordaar	John	
1996	Rangbaaz	Doga	
1995	Veergati	Jack Gulati	
1995	Hum Dono	Shobhraj, a hitman	
1995	Janam Kundli		
1995	Karan Arjun	Shamsher Singh	
1995	Ravan Raaj: A True Story	Bhagat Dada	
1994	Stuntman		
1994	Suhaag	Rahi Bahadur's henchman	
1994	Insaaf Apne Lahoo Se		
1994	Khuddar	Kapali	
1994	Pathreela Raasta	Amarkanth	
1993	Yugandhar	Lakhan	
1993	Phool Aur Angaar	Richard	
1992	Apradhi	Shakura	
1992	Deedar		
1992	Tahalka	Dong's army Capt. Richard	
1992	Kasak	Police inspector	
1992	Beta		
1991	Pyar Hua Chori Chori		
1991	Shanti Kranti	Daddy's henchman	
1991	Dharam Sankat		
1991	Pratikar	Billa	
1991	Inspector Dhanush		
1991	Jungle Love		
1990	Teri Talash Mein		
1990	Pyar Ka Karz		
1990	Taqdeer Ka Tamasha	George	
1990	Izzatdaar	Chhagan	
1990	Kroadh	Sikander	
1990	Bandh Darwaza	Nevla's devotee	
1990	Jurm	Anthony	
1990	Sheshnaag	Ganpat	
1989	Dost		
1989	Toofan	Daku Jagga	
1989	Shehzaade	Jai	uncredited
1988	Pyaar Ka Mandir	Shamsher , goon of Dilip	
1988	Waqt Ki Awaz	Shamsher , Sikander,s goon	
1988	Maalamaal	Karan	
1988	Tezaab	Mukut Bihari	
1988	Gangaa Jamunaa Saraswathi	Bheema	uncredited
1987	Watan Ke Rakhwale	Shamsher, Raj Puri's goon	
1987	Kudrat Ka Kanoon		
1987	Sheela	Jack	as Jack Gaur
1986	Duty	Jeeva	
1985	3D Saamri	Bhisham	as Jack Gaur
1984	Insaaf Kaun Karega	Lal Singh	

=== Other languages ===
Year	Title	Role	Language
1986	Africadalli Sheela		Kannada
1991	Kshana Kshanam	Ungan	Telugu
1998	Yuvarathna Rana		Telugu
1999	Sultan	Terrorist	Telugu

== Later life and death ==
After a successful career in film industry, Jack Gaud died of a heart attack aged just 42 on 8 June 2000 at his home in Mumbai. He is survived by his wife and two sons. His son Amit Jack Gaud is also an actor.
