= Ponnuketha Purushan =

- Title card
- Directed by: Gangai Amaran
- Screenplay by: Gangai Amaran
- Story by: Vinu Chakravarthy
- Produced by: S. Rangarajan
- Starring: Ramarajan; Gautami; Rajeev; Sadhana
- Cinematography: A. Sabapathy
- Edited by: B. Lenin; V. T. Vijayan
- Music by: Ilaiyaraaja
- Production company: Mars International
- Release date: 27 June 1992
- Country: India
- Language: Tamil

Ponnuketha Purushan (transl. Perfect husband for the girl) is a 1992 Indian Tamil-language film, directed by Gangai Amaran. The film stars Ramarajan, Gautami, Rajeev and Sadhana. It was released on 27 June 1992, and was a box office failure.

== Plot ==
In Arasampatti village, Ganapathy is a devoted MGR fan and a cinema lover. He works at Ganapathy theatre, where he plays an active role in selecting films and advertising by narrating movie stories across the village. His father, Shanmugam, runs the canteen at the same theatre. Ganapathy is a sincere and responsible employee, and even stands up against miscreants who harass women at the theatre, while the theatre owner's son Sekar, is a spoiled man who spends his time chasing women and drinking at a wineshop run by three women — Madhana, Vadhana, and Bhuvana.

In a nearby village, Thuppakki Duraisingam strongly opposes having a theatre, as he believes cinema exploits villagers' hard-earned money. His daughter, Karpagam, who secretly longs to watch films, becomes fascinated by Ganapathy's engaging narration. Her curiosity peaks when he stops midway through narrating Kizhakke Pogum Rail, prompting her to request him to complete the story. Ganapathy and Karpagam begin meeting secretly in the nearby hills, where Ganapathy falls in love with her but remains unsure of her feelings. With encouragement from the theatre operator, Ganapathy eventually realises that Karpagam too has reciprocated his love.

Meanwhile, Anandhi joins the village as a newly appointed high school teacher. Enamoured by her beauty, Sekar begins pursuing her. To aid his advances, Sekar deceitfully hands over his ring and chain, falsely presenting them as a symbol of marriage to emotionally manipulate and exploit her trust. The theatre ticket vendor develops an affair with Nellore Ellamma, a newly appointed sweeper. The theatre operator orchestrates their marriage by arranging for Ellamma's relatives to catch them together. His plan succeeds, and the vendor marries Ellamma. Meanwhile, a con artist posing as a wealthy woman traps the operator, who pretends to be rich to impress her. Soon after, the police arrive searching for the con artist, revealing her fraudulent activities and her relationship with the operator. Hearing of the police's arrival, the operator flees but is later arrested and bailed out by Ganapathy.

After several days without meeting Ganapathy, Karpagam gathers the courage to visit the theatre while Anbe Vaa is being screened. While leaving with Ganapathy, they are spotted by Sekar, who warns Ganapathy to stay away, declaring his intention to marry Karpagam himself. Ganapathy refuses, asserting their mutual love. Karpagam's mother, Deivanai, soon learns of her daughter's relationship with Ganapathy. To marry Karpagam, Sekar feigns humility and invites Duraisingam to the theatre. Touched by the gesture, Duraisingam visits the theatre to receive a grand welcome arranged by Sekar. During the interval, Ganapathy accidentally spills snacks on Karpagam, which Duraisingam interprets as an ill omen and leaves. Sekar assumes Ganapathy did this intentionally to sabotage his marriage proposal and assaults him. Ganapathy retaliates, but the fight is halted by the arrival of Sekar's father and Shanmugam.

Now, Sekar's father reveals a long-hidden truth: the actual owner of the theatre is Shanmugam. Being illiterate, Shanmugam had entrusted the business to Sekar's father while choosing to keep this a secret even from Ganapathy. Furious, Sekar storms off, declaring he will never return. His father falls ill, and Ganapathy and Shanmugam care for him. Sekar moves in with Madhana, Vadhana, and Bhuvana, appearing to spend lavishly on them. Due to a lorry strike, Duraisingam's farm produce remains unsold. Sekar pretends to help by intoxicating the lorry drivers with alcohol and seductive dances arranged by the three women. Under the influence, the driver follows his instructions, successfully transporting the produce. This earns Sekar Duraisingam's trust. Pretending loyalty, Sekar flatters Duraisingam, while Karpagam and Deivanai, out of fear, remain silent about his true intentions.

Meanwhile, Ganapathy seeks loans to build his own theatre, assuring Karpagam that he will marry her soon. Concerned about Sekar's father's health, Ganapathy pleads with Sekar to return, but Sekar rejects him. Sekar's father wishes to transfer the theatre back to Shanmugam, acknowledging his rightful ownership, but Shanmugam refuses out of friendship. Sekar then stages a suicide attempt, claiming his love for Karpagam. Moved by this act and unaware of Sekar's true nature, Duraisingam agrees to the marriage. To prevent interference, Sekar abducts Ganapathy. It is later revealed that Sekar never truly spent money on the three women; instead, he took loans in their names and deceived them. Realising the truth, Madhana, Vadhana, and Bhuvana rush to the wedding venue. Through a song-and-dance performance, they expose Sekar's womanising, deceit, and multiple affairs, shocking Duraisingam, who had believed Sekar to be honourable.

Ganapathy arrives at the wedding with Anandhi, now pregnant and abandoned by Sekar. Enraged, Sekar declares he will marry Karpagam regardless of consent and unleashes his three henchmen—Azhagu, Rambo Rajkumar, and Judo Rathnam—on Ganapathy. After a fierce fight, Ganapathy defeats them. Finally, Sekar's father publicly reveals that Ganapathy is the true owner of the theatre. Realising Ganapathy's integrity and love for Karpagam, Duraisingam accepts their relationship. The film concludes with Sekar marrying Anandhi to take responsibility for his actions, and Ganapathy marrying Karpagam.

== Cast ==
- Ramarajan as Ganapathy
- Gautami as Karpagam
- Rajeev as Sekar
- Sadhana as Anandhi
- Goundamani as a theatre operator
- Senthil as a ticket vendor
- Vinu Chakravarthy as Thuppakki Duraisingam
- V. Gopalakrishnan as Shanmugam
- Shanmugasundaram as the Theatre owner
- Kovai Sarala as Nellore Ellamma
- Anuja as a con artist
- Varalakshmi as Deivanai, Karpagam's mother
- Disco Shanti as Madhana
- Babitha as Bhuvana
- J. Lalitha as Vadhana
- Karikol Raju as Ellamma's father
- Pasi Narayanan as Sekar's aide
- Periya Karuppu Thevar as a villager
- Vellai Subbaiah as a villager in the wedding
- Karuppu Subbiah as a villager in the wedding
- Vasu as Duraisingam's accountant
- Judo Rathnam in a special appearance as himself
- Rambo Rajkumar in a special appearance as himself
- Azhagu in a special appearance as himself

== Soundtrack ==
The music was composed by Ilaiyaraaja.

Song	Singers	Lyrics	Length
"Cinema"	Ilaiyaraaja	Ilaiyaraaja	04:30
"Saaranga Dhaara"	Malaysia Vasudevan, P. Susheela	Gangai Amaran	05:07
"Devathai Vanthaal"	P. Jayachandran, Swarnalatha	Gangai Amaran	05:26
"Paal Ninainthoothum"	Swarnalatha	Gangai Amaran	01:20
"Kuruvi Pudhicha"	K. S. Chithra	Gangai Amaran	04:41
"Maalai Nilave"	Mano, K. S. Chithra	Gangai Amaran	05:03
"Duraina Durai"	Swarnalatha, K. S. Chithra & Minmini	Gangai Amaran	05:08

== Reception ==
RSP of The Indian Express gave an average review for the film and called Amaran's direction "so-so". He criticised the music, saying, "And the songs! Ilaiyaraja seems to be away on a summer vacation".
