= Pardesi (1993 film) =

1993 Hindi action film

- Directed by: Raj N. Sippy
- Written by: Iqbal Durrani
- Produced by: Mohan Baggad
- Starring: Mithun Chakraborty; Sumalata; Varsha Usgaonkar; Iqbal Durrani; Pankaj Dheer; Shakti Kapoor; Suresh Oberoi
- Music by: Anand–Milind
- Distributed by: Mithun's Dream Factory
- Release date: 20 August 1993
- Country: India
- Language: Hindi

Pardesi is a 1993 Hindi action film starring Mithun Chakraborty and Varsha Usgaonkar with Shakti Kapoor and Sumalatha in supporting roles.

== Plot ==
Pardesi is the story of young villager Shiva who along with his family wants to be free from the claws of slavery imposed upon by the village Thakur and Lala since many generations.

Shiva decides to leave village and go to big city in search of new life but tragedy stuck, he is caught by the police for a heinous murder.

Judge Rajiv Verma (Suresh Oberoi) finds Shiva guilty and pronounces death penalty on him.

Before Shiva could be hanged he expresses his last wish to meet the Judge the one who had sentenced him.

Judge comes, meets Shiva who once again talks of his innocence but before his hanging Shiva also pronounces a sentence on Judge - that only he should go to his family and break the news of his death to his wife - father, sister an young son.

Judge affix a great mental turmoil comes to the village to disclose Shiva's hanging but cannot because of the plight of the family which he sees with his own eyes. He leaves everything to almighty.

To the shock and dismay one day Judge sees a handcuffed criminal Shankar is duplicate of Shiva.

== Cast ==
- Mithun Chakraborty as Shiva & Shanker
- Varsha Usgaonkar as Shanker's girlfriend
- Iqbal Durrani as Thakur
- Pankaj Dheer as Hussain
- Sumalatha as Shanti
- Shakti Kapoor - Lala
- Suresh Oberoi - Judge Rajiv Verma

== Soundtrack ==
Pardesi

Soundtrack album by Anand–Milind, Nikhil–Vinay
- Released: 1993
- Recorded: 1993

The music for Pardesi was composed by the duo Anand–Milind, Nikhil–Vinay and lyrics were written by Sameer, Yogesh.

Title	Singer(s)	Composer(s)	Lyricist(s)
"Wallah Wallah Saare Gaaon Mein"	Anuradha Paudwal	Anand–Milind	Sameer
"Saathiya Mujhe Neend Na Aaye Aaj Kal"	Anuradha Paudwal, Suresh Wadkar	Anand–Milind	Sameer
"Meri Toh Har Shaam Hai Tere Naam"	Amit Kumar, Anuradha Paudwal	Anand–Milind	Sameer
"Pardesi Laut Ke Aana" (version 1)	Kumar Sanu, Anuradha Paudwal, Anup Jalota	Anand–Milind	Sameer
"Pardesi Laut Ke Aana" (version 2)	Anup Jalota	Anand–Milind	Sameer
"Hum Hain Bhangedi, Humein Bhang Pila De"	Abhijeet Bhattacharya, Usha Timothy	Anand–Milind	Sameer
"Sathiya Sun Le Pukaar"	Debashish Dasgupta & Anuradha Paudwal	Nikhil–Vinay	Yogesh
"Mere Dil Mein Tu Hi Tu Hai"	Udit Narayan	Nikhil–Vinay	Yogesh
"Hun Mainu Yaad Teri Aayi"	Anuradha Paudwal	Nikhil–Vinay	Yogesh
