= Sanyasi Mera Naam =

- DVD Cover
- Directed by: Imran Khalid
- Written by: Sami-Javed
- Produced by: Manisha Vimal
- Starring: Mithun Chakraborty; Dharmendra; Siddharth Dhawan; Shalini Kapoor; Raushni Jaffrey; Kader Khan; Dhananjay Singh
- Music by: Anand–Milind
- Release date: 1 October 1999
- Running time: 135 min.
- Language: Hindi

Sanyasi Mera Naam (transl. Sanyasi is my name) is a 1999 Indian Hindi-language action film directed by Imran Khalid, starring Mithun Chakraborty, Kader Khan, Milind Gunaji and Dhananjay Singh. The film also has Dharmendra in a special appearance. Alongside Dada, this film was one of Mithun Chakraborty's only films to recover its box office budget that year.

== Plot ==
A man cheats local villagers as Sanyasi (Monk). The police chase him and while escaping from the police, he accidentally kills a man and reaches a village. He takes shelter in a house but soon finds that he is staying in the house of the man he killed. Now the Sanyasi turns into a changed person and protects the family from local goons.

== Cast ==
- Mithun Chakraborty as Shankar Sanyasi
- Dharmendra as Ashok
- Siddharth Dhawan as Vikram
- Shalini Kapoor as Nisha
- Kader Khan as Bhootnath
- Mohan Joshi as Trikaal
- Tej Sapru as Pratap
- Suvarna Mathew as Vinita
- Yunus Parvez as Hazi Saheb
- Sonia Sahni as Nirmala
- Satyen Kappu as Ramlal
- Rudraksh as Santosh Bhardwaj
- Mushtaq Khan as Lala Parvez
- Dhananjay Singh as Sanjay
- Johny Nirmal as Chandan Singh
- Bobby Saini as Narendra
- Roshini Jaffery as Seema
- Rutika Singh as herself (Special Dance Number)

== Music ==
All songs are written by Sameer Anjaan.

1. "Arrey Arrey Arrey Arrey" - Poornima, Vinod Rathod
2. "Pyar Da Uda Eda" - Jaspinder Narula, Sonu Nigam
3. "Main Saara Din Royi Mai Rat Bhar Na Soi" - Poornima
4. "Hai Khwabo Ki Tu Rani" - Vishwajeet Mukherjee
5. "Aashiq Hai Ladke" - Sonu Nigam, Jaspinder Narula
