= Paandi Nattu Thangam =

- DVD cover
- Directed by: T. P. Gajendran
- Screenplay by: Sangili Murugan
- Story by: Rajavarman
- Produced by: Kalyani Murugan
- Starring: Karthik; Nirosha
- Cinematography: N. K. Viswanathan
- Edited by: Ganesh–Kumar
- Music by: Ilaiyaraaja
- Production company: Meenakshi Arts
- Release date: 19 May 1989
- Running time: 130 minutes
- Country: India
- Language: Tamil

Paandi Nattu Thangam is a 1989 Indian Tamil-language romantic drama film directed by T. P. Gajendran. The film stars Karthik and Nirosha. It was released on 19 May 1989.

== Plot ==
Thangapandian, an honest forest range officer, is transferred to Vembarali village, where he's dead set against illegal tree logging. He uses his physical force to stop a lumberjack, which doesn't go down well with the villagers who rely on firewood for cooking and selling. They're forced to pick rags, sticks, and dried branches, often selling them to Chelladurai, who randomly fixes the prices. Thangapandian insists they the villagers get identity cards to collect firewood legally, and the village munsif grants them. Chelladurai's uncle, the rich village chief, is secretly cutting sandalwood trees. He wants Thangapandian to turn a blind eye, but Thangapandian refuses, shouting for him to stop.

Meanwhile, Radha and her sister Durga, from a poor family, collect firewood for a living. Chelladurai's got his eyes on Radha. Thangapandian learns that Durga's biological father was a renowned singer, Mohanasundaram, and Radha's talent, too. They bond over music, and Radha develops feelings for Thangapandian. Thangapandian stops Ayyavu, a ruthless lumberjack sent by the village chief, and beats him. The chief retaliates by threatening Thangapandian's father, Captain Raghu, and sends goons to harm him. Raghu visits the village, challenges the chief, and fights off the goons with Thangapandian.

Chelladurai informs Radha's family about her moments with Thangapandian, and they're furious. Radha's adoptive father, Subbaiah, house-arrests her, planning to marry her off to someone else. The village chief and Chelladurai decide to restrain Thangapandian from entering the village. Subbaiah reluctantly agrees to Radha's marriage to Chelladurai, but Radha pleads not to. Thangapandian learns of her house arrest and, disguised as a bangle seller, meets and consoles her, evading villagers. The village chief hires a group of armed henchmen headed by Rangan to kill Thangapandian, but he escapes and fights them back. Durga witnesses this and informs the police, leading to the henchmen's arrest.

Thangapandian, disguised as a dancer, meets Radha at the village festival, but they're separated, and she's locked up. The village panchayat decides against Radha and Thangapandian's union, citing outdated customs. Thangapandian exposes the village chief's corruption and smuggling. Chelladurai abducts Radha, injuring Durga, but Thangapandian rescues her and defeats Chelladurai, who dies in the fire he set. The village chief is arrested, and Radha and Thangapandian unite happily.

== Cast ==
- Karthik as Thangapandian, Forest range officer
- Nirosha as Radha
- Senthamarai as the village chief
- A. K. Veerasamy as Subbaiah, Radha's adoptive father
- Babloo Prithiveeraj as Chelladurai
- S. S. Chandran as Subramaniam, Vinayagam's elder brother
- Senthil as Vinayagam, Thangapandian's assistant
- Kovai Sarala as Venkatasubbama "Chuppu", a street perfomer
- Gandhimathi as Vinayagam's elder sister
- S. N. Parvathy as Chellamma, Radha's adoptive mother
- Vijayachandrika as Lakshmi, Thangapandian's mother
- Sattam Pillai Venkatraman
- Peeli Sivam as Rangan, an armed henchman
- Usilai Mani as Chuppu's relative
- Kullamani as a tea master
- Baby Manju as Durga, Radha's adoptive sister
- Karuppu Subbiah as Chuppu's father
- Rambo Rajkumar as an illegal logger
- M. N. Nambiar in a special appearance as Captain Raghu, Thangapandian's father
- V Gopalakrishnan in a special appearance as an Inspector
- Sangili Murugan in a special appearance as the village munsif
- Vijaya Rangaraju as Ayyavu (uncredited role)

== Soundtrack ==
The music was composed by Ilaiyaraaja, with lyrics written by Gangai Amaran.

Song	Singer(s)	Duration
"Elalam Kuyiley Elemara Veyiley"	S. P. Balasubrahmanyam, Uma Ramanan	5:39
"Ilam Vayasu Ponna"	Malaysia Vasudevan, K. S. Chithra	4:34
"Mayilaadum"	S. P. Balasubrahmanyam, K. S. Chithra	4:32
"Paandi Naattu Thangam"	Ilaiyaraaja	3:10
"Siru Koottile Ulla"	K. S. Chithra, Mano	4:11
"Unn Manasile Paattuthaan" (happy)	Mano, K. S. Chithra	4:24
"Unn Manasile Paattuthaan" (sad)	S. P. Balasubrahmanyam, K. S. Chithra	4:33

== Reception ==
P. S. S. of Kalki felt Karthik looked disinterested and panned Senthamarai's villainy as repetitive, S. S. Chandran's comedy as vulgar but praised the performances of Nambiar, Nirosha, Sarala's comedy and Ilaiyaraaja's music and concluded instead of agonising over how things will turn out, if they decide that this is the way it will be, the people who watch the film will turn away with indifference.
