= Suvarna Mathew =

Indian actress

- Occupation: Film actor
- Years active: 1991–present
- Spouse: Varghese Jacob
- Children: 2

Suvarna Mathew is an Indian actress in South Indian movies. She was a prominent lead actress during the 1990s in Malayalam and Kannada films. She had acted in few Tamil, Telugu and Hindi movies as well. She has acted with Vishnuvardhan in Kiladigalu, Jayaram in Sudhinam and Suman in Nayudugari Kutumbam. She has paired with Mithun Chakraborty in the films Do Numbri, Meri Adalat, Sultaan and Sanyasi Mera Naam.

She made a comeback with the Malayalam movie Chattakaari in 2012.

== Personal life ==
Suvarna was born to Mathew and Elsamma, as the youngest among four children, at Pala, Kerala. She has two brothers; Saji, Sibi and a sister, Swapna. She won the Miss Kerala title in 1992, which paved her a way to the film industry. She rose to fame after the Malayalam movie Valayam. She married Varghese Jacob in 2003, and they have a son, Jacob and a daughter, Jia. She is settled in Philadelphia, United States with family.

== Partial filmography ==
=== Malayalam ===
List of Suvarna Mathew Malayalam film credits
Year	Title	Role	Notes
1991	Mimics Parade		
1991	Uncle Bun	Student	
1991	Sundhari Kakka		Cameo appearance
1991	Kilukkam	Pilla's relative	
1991	Kilukkampetti		Cameo in song
1991	Innathe Program	Unni's Neighbor	
1992	Kauravar	Aliyar's daughter	
1992	Maanyanmar	Thomas's sister	
1992	Congratulations Miss Anitha Menon	Seetha	
1992	Ennodu Ishtam Koodamo	Sudha Varma	
1992	Valayam	Radha	
1993	Akashadoothu	Mini David	
1993	Samooham	Thulasi	
1993	Sthalathe Pradhana Payyans		
1994	Sudhinam	Anila	
1995	Saadaram	Lekha	
1998	Aaghosham	Nancy	
1998	Sooryavanam	Maya	
1999	Gaandhiyan	Adv. Yamuna Rahim	
1999	Indulekha		
1999	Red Indians	Maya	
2000	Kannaadikkadavathu	Ramani	
2000	The Gang	Merlyn	
2000	Varavaay	Vijayan's second wife	
2001	Malavika	Susanna	
2002	Mazhathullikkilukkam	Treesa	
2003	Kalavarkey	Alice	
2005	The Tiger	Subaida Ahammed	
2005	Nerariyan CBI	Maya	
2006	Lion	Krishnakumar's elder sister	
2008	Aayudham	CI Vandana	
2010	9 KK Road	Mollykutty	
2012	Chattakaari	Margarette	
2019	Issacinte Kathakal	Aleena	

=== Tamil ===
List of Suvarna Mathew Tamil film credits
Year	Title	Role	Notes
1994	Thaai Manasu	Annalakshmi	
1995	Kizhakku Malai	Kanchana	
1995	Mayabazar	Swarna	
1996	Gokulathil Seethai	Kaveri	Guest appearance
1997	Periya Thambi	Kannamma	
1998	Ponmaanai Thedi	Priya	
2002	Roja Kootam	Kiran	
2002	Shakalaka Baby	Sooravalli	
2003	Oru Thadava Sonna		
2003	Enakku 20 Unakku 18	Preeti's sister-in-law	
2004	Joot	Gayathri	
2004	Varnajalam		
2005	Chandramukhi	Swarna	
2005	Oru Naal Oru Kanavu	Maya's sister	
2006	Thirupathi		
2012	Neeyum Naanum		

=== Telugu ===
List of Suvarna Mathew Telugu film credits
Year	Title	Role	Notes
1996	Nayudugari Kutumbam	Hema	
1997	High Class Atha Low Class Alludu	Bhama	
1998	Life Lo Wife	Sachcha Devi	
1999	Preminchalani Vundi	Julie	
2003	Nee Manasu Naaku Telusu	Preeti's sister-in-law	

=== Kannada ===
List of Suvarna Mathew Kannada film credits
Year	Title	Role	Notes
1994	Kiladigalu	Dr. Deepa	
1996	Ibbara Naduve Muddina Aata		
1997	Choo Baana	Poornima	
1998	Maathina Malla	Rani	
1998	Mari Kannu Hori Myage		
1998	Kanasalu Neene Manasalu Neene	Julie	
1998	Dayadi	Susheela	
1999	Mr. X	Asha	
1999	Khalanayaka		
2001	Rashtrageethe		
2001	Kanoonu	Kaveri	
2001	Jithendra		
2008	Bandhu Balaga		

=== Hindi ===
List of Suvarna Mathew Hindi film credits
Year	Title	Role	Notes
1998	Do Numbri	Jamuna	
1999	Sanyasi Mera Naam		
2000	Sultaan	Ayesha	

== Serials ==
- Yagama Thiyagama - Micro Thodar Macro Sinthanaigal - Tamil TV series
- Gunagalum Ranagalum -Micro Thodar Macro Sinthanaigal - Tamil TV series
- Avicharitham (2004) - Malayalam TV series
- Kadamattathu Kathanar (2004) - Malayalam TV series
- Anweshi - Malayalam TV series
- Sreethwam - Malayalam TV series
- Sathurangam (2005-2006) - Tamil TV series
- January (2007) - Malayalam TV series
- Thenmozhiyal (2007) - Tamil TV series
- Maya Machindra - Tamil TV series
- Akashadoothu - Malayalam TV series - (Archive footage)
