= Somayajulu =

Somayajulu is a Telugu first name (given name). Notable people with the given name include:

- S. N. Somayajulu, Indian politician
- Jonnalagadda Venkata Somayajulu (1920 or c. 1928–2004), Indian film actor
- Chaganti Somayajulu (1915–1994), Telugu writer

Note: It is customary in the Telugu tradition to write the surname first followed by the given name.
