= Amaidhipadai =

- Theatrical release poster
- Directed by: Manivannan
- Written by: Manivannan
- Produced by: K. Balachandran; U. K. Senthil Kumar; K. N. Ilamurugu
- Starring: Sathyaraj; Ranjitha; Kasthuri; Sujatha
- Cinematography: D. Shankar
- Edited by: P. Venkateshwara Rao
- Music by: Ilaiyaraaja
- Production company: M. R. Films International
- Release date: 13 January 1994
- Running time: 160 minutes
- Country: India
- Language: Tamil

Amaidhipadai (transl. Peacekeeping Force) is a 1994 Indian Tamil-language political satire action film, written and directed by Manivannan. The film stars Sathyaraj (in a dual role), Ranjitha, Kasthuri and Sujatha. It revolves around a politician who builds his career through unethical means, while his son, an honest law enforcer, seeks to take him down.

Amaidhipadai was released on 13 January 1994. It had a 25-week plus theatrical run and was a silver jubilee hit. The film has since developed a strong cult following. It was remade in Telugu as M. Dharmaraju M.A. (1994) and in Hindi as Jallaad (1995). A spiritual successor, Nagaraja Cholan MA, MLA was released in 2013, with Sathyaraj and Manivannan returning in their roles.

== Plot ==
In 1968, Amavasai, is a lazy and transient, but shrewd man. He becomes an associate of politician Manimaran "Mani" and rises in politics. Amavasai drugs and seduces Thayamma, a village girl, into intercourse and abandons her; she later dies after giving birth to his son Thangavel. Amavasai marries the wealthy Sivakami and gains status and influence, although she chooses to remain celibate due to his refusal to adopt Thangavel. Over the next 24 years, Amavasai becomes a powerful and corrupt MLA, eliminating anyone who threatens his ambitions.

Thangavel grows up unaware of his parentage and becomes a police officer. After learning that Amavasai is his father and was responsible for his mother's death, he vows revenge. Meanwhile, Amavasai incites a caste riot to secure re-election. Thangavel, assigned to protect him, reveals his identity and begins working to expose his crimes with the help of Sivakami. When Amavasai has Sivakami murdered, Thangavel publicly assaults him and is imprisoned.

Before the election, Amavasai attempts to marry Thangavel's fiancée, Kuyili, on the advice of a tantric. Thangavel escapes custody, rescues Kuyili, and confronts Amavasai. After defeating his henchmen, he shoots and kills his father. In his final moments, Amavasai blesses Thangavel and Kuyili.

== Cast ==
- Sathyaraj as Thangavel and Amavasai (Nagaraja Cholan)
- Ranjitha as Kuyil
- Kasthuri as Thayamma
- Sujatha as Sivakami
- R. Sundarrajan as Thangavel's uncle
- S. S. Chandran as Thayamma's father
- Malaysia Vasudevan as Kuyili's father
- Gandhimathi as Thayamma's mother
- C. R. Saraswathi as Kuyili's mother
- Baby Aarthi as Kuyili's sister
- Madurai Vasu as Amavasai's assistant
- Manivannan as Manimaran

Uncredited

- Meesai Murugesan as Sivakami's father
- Vellai Subbaiah as the astrologer
- Seeman

== Production ==
Sathyaraj was enjoying good success as a lead actor, when his friend, director Manivannan narrated the script of Amaidhipadai to him. He initially considered rejecting the script as he was not interested in playing a negative role. But after being impressed by the narration, he accepted to do the film. While filming the scene where Amavasai (Sathyaraj) has sexual intercourse with Thayamma (Kasthuri), Sathyaraj acted carefully to prioritise the actress' comfort; the scene took four hours to shoot. The film, according to Ashish Rajadhyaksha and Paul Willemen, indirectly criticises the real-life political party Dravida Munnetra Kazhagam's (DMK) penchant for nepotism.

== Soundtrack ==
The music was composed by Ilaiyaraaja. The song "Anjugajam Kanchipattu" which features in Manivannan's later film Raasamahan (1994) was originally composed for this film.

Song	Artist(s)	Lyrics
"Sollividu Velli Nilave"	Mano, Swarnalatha	Vaali
"Enakku Unnai Ninaicha"	Swarnalatha	Pulamaipithan
"Ada Naan Aatchu"	Mano	Pulamaipithan
"Muthumani Ther Irukku"	Mano, S. Janaki	Vaali
"Vetri Varuthu"	Mano, S. N. Surendar, Deepan Chakravarthy	Ponnadiyan
"Amma Thaaye"	Ilaiyaraaja	

== Release ==
Amaidhipadai was released on 13 January 1994, the week of Pongal. Despite facing competition from other Pongal releases like Mahanadhi, Sethupathi IPS and Veetla Visheshanga, it emerged a major success, running for over 25 weeks in theatres, thus becoming a silver jubilee film.

== Critical reception ==
Malini Mannath of The Indian Express lauded Sathyaraj's performance as Amavasai, adding, "The scenes of the steady rise of the sly cunning man have been well built up by Manivannan. The dialogues are provocative and delivered in his inimitable way by Sathyaraj". K. Vijiyan of New Straits Times wrote "A pretty much straight-forward story but it is Manivannan's super handling and interesting dialogues that place this movie above the average". Thulasi of Kalki felt the film's story was similar to Mr. Bharath (1986), only the screenplay and dialogues were different, praised the performances of Sathyaraj and Manivannan but felt Sundarrajan and Ranjitha were underutilised and found stunts as childish and also there were too many songs but the background music was superb.

== Legacy ==
Amaidhipadai attained cult status in Tamil cinema. Following Manivannan's death in June 2013, The Hindu wrote that this film "set the standards for political satire" in the industry. It was remade in Telugu as M. Dharmaraju M.A. (1994), and in Hindi as Jallaad (1995). Manivannan directed a spiritual successor titled Nagaraja Cholan MA, MLA (2013) with Sathyaraj reprising the role of Amavasai. Sathyaraj again reprised the role in Tughlaq Durbar (2021). Sathyaraj played Amavasai's son, MLA Pournami, in Love Marriage (2025). A 4K-remastered version of the film with Dolby sound was released on 10 April 2026, two weeks before the Tamil Nadu Legislative Assembly election.
