= Kaalia (1997 film) =

- Poster
- Directed by: T. L. V. Prasad
- Written by: T. L. V. Prasad, Aadesh K. Arjun (dialogues)
- Produced by: Sunil Bohra
- Starring: Mithun Chakraborty; Dipti Bhatnagar; Sheeba; Kiran Kumar; Johnny Lever; Raza Murad; Mukesh Rishi; Paintal
- Cinematography: Navkant
- Edited by: Shyam Mukherjee
- Music by: Anand Raj Anand
- Production company: Roop Combines
- Release date: 28 March 1997
- Running time: 145 minutes
- Country: India
- Language: Hindi

Kaalia is a 1997 Indian Hindi-language action film directed by T. L. V. Prasad, starring Mithun Chakraborty, Dipti Bhatnagar, Sheeba, Kiran Kumar, Johnny Lever, Raza Murad and Mukesh Rishi. The movie was a hit at the box office. This movie was also appreciated by the critics for its brilliant story and action. Kaalia is considered one of the best action movies of Mithun from his Ooty factory.

== Plot ==
Kalicharan lives a middle-class life with his unmarried sister. Since Kalicharan is an honest man, he refuses to pay or accept bribes, which brings him into the bad books of gangster Bhawani Singh. When Kalicharan refuses to budge, Singh gets Kalicharan arrested on false charges and he is sent to prison. In prison, a new Kalicharan is born — who calls himself Kaalia — and whose main motive is the destruction of Bhawani Singh.

== Cast ==
- Mithun Chakraborty as Kalicharan 'Kaalia'
- Dipti Bhatnagar as Priya, Mahesh Malhotra's daughter
- Sheeba as A.C.P. Priyanka Sinha
- Kiran Kumar as Mahesh Malhotra
- Johnny Lever as Khaan Sahab/Dada
- Ram Mohan as Police Commissioner
- Mukesh Rishi as Pratap Singh
- Ajit Vachani as Home Minister
- Raza Murad as Lallan Yadav
- Paintal as Nandlal Choubey
- Rami Reddy as Bhavani Singh
- Tej Sapru as Police Inspector Vikram
- Arun Mathur as Chief Minister
- Monicka
- Razak Khan as Raj Santopi
- Kangna Ranuat as Jyoti

== Soundtrack ==
Kaalia

Soundtrack album by Anand Raj Anand
- Released: 1997

Kaalia soundtrack
No.	Title	Singer (s)	Length
1.	"Aanewala Hai"	Kavita Krishnamurthy
2.	"Bedardi Ke Sang Pyar Kiya"	Udit Narayan, Alka Yagnik
3.	"Iski Hoon Na Uski Hoon"	Poornima, Anand Raj Anand
4.	"Jo Bhi Dhundungi"	Kavita Krishnamurthy
5.	"Meethi Meethi Baatein"	Pankaj Udhas, Jaishree Shivram
6.	"Mujhko Yeh Lagta Hai"	S. P. Balasubrahmanyam, K. S. Chitra
7.	"Tumne Di Sadaa Aur Mein"	Udit Narayan, Kavita Krishnamurthy
8.	"Tunha Tunha"	Poornima
9.	"Saawan Ki Raat Suhani"	Poornima, Kumar Sanu
