= Zakhmi Sipahi =

- DVD cover
- Directed by: T L V Prasad
- Written by: T L V Prasad; Anirudh Tiwari (dialogues)
- Produced by: K.C. Bokadia
- Starring: Mithun Chakraborty; Om Puri; Rituparna Sengupta; Puneet Issar
- Cinematography: Navkant
- Edited by: Shyam Mukherjee; Govind Dalwadi
- Music by: Rais Bhartiya
- Production company: BMB Pictures
- Release date: 26 May 1995
- Running time: 125 minutes
- Country: India
- Language: Hindi

Zakhmi Sipahi is a 1995 Indian Hindi-language film directed by T L V Prasad, starring Mithun Chakraborty, Om Puri, Rituparna Sengupta and Puneet Issar.

== Plot ==
An honest officer is forced to deliver a wrong verdict, spiralling his reputation & so commits suicide; his wife subsequently becomes mad. His son takes it upon him to bring the perpetuators to justice. A 3-way classic combo of Chakraborty, TLV Prasad & KC Bokadia.

== Cast ==
- Mithun Chakraborty as DSP Shakti Khanna
- Om Puri as Om Chaudhary
- Rituparna Sengupta as SI Jyoti, DSP Shakti's Love❤-interest, Inspector Kiran Kumar's sister
- Vani Viswanath as Priya, one-sided love❤ to DSP Shakti
- Vikas Anand as Com. Gautam Gorakhnath, DSP Shakti's father
- Puneet Issar as Chhota Chaudhary
- Goga Kapoor as DGP Amar Sharma
- Kunickaa Sadanand as Cameo, in song "O Chaila"
- Ram Mohan as C.M. Baburao Deshmukh
- Dina Pathak as Usha , Shakti's grandmother
- Jagdish Raj as Inspector Kiran Kumar and SI Jyoti's brother
- Mahavir Shah as Rajesh (son of M.L.A)
- Tiku Talsania as Narayan, Priya's brother

== Music ==
1. "NakhreWali Ghar Se Nikli" — Abhijeet
2. "Hothon Se Chahat Ka Izhar" - Sadhana Sargam, Abhijeet
3. "Lips To Lips" — Sapna Mukherjee, Abhijeet
4. "Tum Sharma Ke Dekho" — Sadhana Sargam, Kumar Sanu
5. "O Laila O Laila" — Shabbir Kumar, Sapna Mukherjee, Ila Arun
6. "Mere Yaar Pe Jawani" — Shabbir Kumar, Poornima
7. "Kudi Pataka" — Ila Arun
