= Ganga Ki Kasam =

- Poster
- Directed by: T L V Prasad
- Written by: Roopvati Bohra; Anirudh Tiwari (dialogues)
- Produced by: Sunil Bohra
- Starring: Mithun Chakraborty; Jackie Shroff; Dipti Bhatnagar; Mink Singh; Johnny Lever; Shakti Kapoor; Dalip Tahil; Mukesh Rishi; Raza Murad
- Cinematography: Ramakrishnan
- Edited by: Shyam Mukherji
- Music by: Bappi Lahiri
- Release date: 4 June 1999
- Running time: 140 minutes
- Country: India
- Language: Hindi

Ganga Ki Kasam (transl. The Vow of Ganga) is a 1999 Indian Hindi-language action film directed by T L V Prasad, produced by Sunil Bohra starring Mithun Chakraborty, Jackie Shroff, Dipti Bhatnagar, Mink Singh, Johnny Lever, Shakti Kapoor, Dalip Tahil, Mukesh Rishi and Raza Murad.

== Plot ==
An authoritative robber in the criminal world, Shankar, comes to a village where bandits led by Jay Singh are creating a real mess. Without hesitation, Shankar enters the fight on the side of the villagers and swears by the waters of the sacred river that lawlessness will no longer happen.

== Cast ==
- Mithun Chakraborty as Shankar
- Jackie Shroff as Jay Singh
- Dipti Bhatnagar as Geeta
- Mink Singh as Rani
- Dalip Tahil as Sahadev Sharma
- Johnny Lever as Qawali Singer Anand Pratap
- Mukesh Rishi as Joga
- Raza Murad as Police Commissioner Vikram
- Shakti Kapoor as Mastan baba
- Rami Reddy as Police Inspector Shera
- Jack Gaud as Bhim Singh
- Shahbaz Khan as Goon Sameer
- Kasam Ali as Goon Chandrakant
- Shiva as Champa
- Anjana Mumtaz as Lakshmi
- Razzak Khan as Niamanzur
- Anirudh Tiwari
- Ali Khan as Daku Shafi
- Kasim Khan

== Soundtrack ==
1. "Bawala Mai Hua Bawla" - Jaspinder Narula, Sukhwinder Singh, Ram Shankar
2. "Banna Re Bagho Me Jhula Ghalo" - Sukhwinder Singh, Jaspinder Narula
3. "Jab Moore Saiya" - Poornima
4. "Hame Pata Hai (Qawwali)" - Altaf Raja, Sadhana Sargam
5. "Hai Rabba Hai Rabba" - Sadhana Sargam
6. "More Kurta Me Khatmal" - Poornima, Amit Kumar
