= Palnati Puli =

- Theatrical release poster
- Directed by: Tatineni Prasad
- Written by: Paruchuri Brothers (dialogues)
- Screenplay by: Tatineni Prasad
- Story by: Bhishetty Lakhsham Rao
- Produced by: Gogineni Prasad
- Starring: Nandamuri Balakrishna; Bhanupriya
- Cinematography: Navakanth
- Edited by: Nayani Maheswara Rao
- Music by: Chakravarthy
- Production company: Sai Chakra Productions
- Release date: 31 October 1984
- Running time: 115 minutes
- Country: India
- Language: Telugu

Palnati Puli (transl. Tiger of Palnadu) is a 1984 Indian Telugu-language action film, produced by Gogineni Prasad under the Sai Chakra Productions banner and directed by Tatineni Prasad. It stars Nandamuri Balakrishna, Bhanupriya and music composed by Chakravarthy.

== Cast ==
- Nandamuri Balakrishna as Raju
- Bhanupriya as Rani
- Satyanarayana as Bhupathi
- Jaggayya as Lawyer Mukundam
- Gokina Rama Rao as Kannaiah
- Mada as Kondandam
- Bhimaraju as Gangulu
- Jaya Malini as item number
- Shyamala Gowri as Gowri
- Prameela as Parvathi
- Anitha as Sharada
- Bindu Madhavi as Saroja

== Soundtrack ==
Palnati Puli

Film score by Chakravarthy
- Released: 1984
- Genre: Soundtrack
- Length: 20:59
- Label: AVM Audio
- Producer: Chakravarthy

Chakravarthy chronology
Disco King (1984)	Palnati Puli (1984)	Kathanayakudu (1984)

Music was composed by Chakravarthy, and lyrics were written by Veturi. Music was released by AVM Audio Company.

S. No.	Song title	Singers	length
1	"Osi Othari Bithari"	S. P. Balasubrahmanyam,	3:59
2	"Kottamaka Thittamaka"	Madhavapeddi Ramesh, P. Susheela	4:14
3	"Abba Swamy Ranga"	P. Susheela	4:15
4	"Neeku Pettanivvu"	Madhavapeddi Ramesh, P. Susheela	4:22
5	"Baka Baaja Dolu"	S. P. Balasubrahmanyam	4:19
