= Disco King (film) =

- Theatrical release poster
- Directed by: Tatineni Prasad
- Written by: Ganesh Patro (dialogues)
- Screenplay by: Tatineni Prasad
- Story by: Deepak Balraj
- Based on: Disco Dancer (1982)
- Produced by: Rakesh
- Starring: Nandamuri Balakrishna; Tulasi
- Cinematography: P. V. Sai Prasad
- Edited by: Kollimarlla Nageswara Rao
- Music by: Chakravarthy
- Production company: Sri Vishnu Films
- Release date: 7 June 1984
- Running time: 135 minutes
- Country: India
- Language: Telugu

Disco King is a 1984 Telugu-language dance film directed by Tatineni Prasad. The film stars Nandamuri Balakrishna and Tulasi, with music composed by Chakravarthy. It is a remake of the Hindi film Disco Dancer (1982). The film was released on 7 June 1984.

== Cast ==
- Nandamuri Balakrishna as Balakrishna
- Tulasi as Tulasi
- Jaggayya as Jagannatham
- Sudhakar as Sudhakar
- Nutan Prasad as Nutan Prasad
- Ranganath as Venkatesh
- Mikkilineni as Ali Baba
- Sumitra as Seeta
- Anupama

== Soundtrack ==
The movie’s soundtrack was pressed by the Star Music label, and released around the same day as the movie was released. The soundtrack was released on 2 Extended play records, each containing four songs from the film. Even after the film’s theatrical run, the records were still being pressed, having its last official press release somewhere during 1991, marking its seven year run.

Music composed by Chakravarthy. Lyrics were written by Veturi.

Song title	Singers	length
"Pattindalla Bangarame"	S. P. Balasubrahmanyam	4:14
"Inte Inte Eelokam"	S. P. Balasubrahmanyam, S.P. Sailaja	5:22
"Chukkalanti Chakkanamma"	S. P. Balasubrahmanyam	4:31
"Abbadi Ammadi"	S. P. Balasubrahmanyam	4:44
"Nuvve Nuvve"	Madhavpeddi Ramesh	3:28
"Vayyaramma"	Madhavpeddi Ramesh	4:32
"Inte Inte Eelokam" (Sad)	S. P. Balasubrahmanyam	2:21
