= Shera (film) =

- DVD cover
- Directed by: T. L. V. Prasad
- Written by: T. L. V. Prasad, Anoop Srivastava (dialogues)
- Produced by: Rajiv Babbar
- Starring: Mithun Chakraborty; Vineetha; Rami Reddy; Gulshan Grover; Asrani
- Cinematography: P. Devaraj
- Edited by: D. N. Malik, Shyam Mukherjee
- Music by: Anand–Milind
- Production company: Aabha Films
- Release date: 5 February 1999
- Running time: 125 minutes
- Country: India
- Language: Hindi

Shera is a 1999 Indian Hindi-language action film directed by T. L. V. Prasad and produced by Rajiv Babbar, starring Mithun Chakraborty, Vineetha, Rami Reddy and Gulshan Grover. Shera was another profitable venture for its producer Rajiv Babbar. The film netted 5.77 crores in India against a total budget of 2.35 crores. Mithun's unique action style made this movie very popular among the mass audience in small centres.

== Plot ==
A Building contractor Jai Khurana (Mithun Chakraborty), is married to Police Inspector Shivani (Vineetha) and lives a happy life. Jai's sister, Jyoti's college, is overrun by drugs, and Shivani takes charge to control the menace. She arrests drug Mafia don Balloo Bakra's (Rami Reddy) brother K.D., which leads to disturbance in the life of Jai. Jai becomes an eyewitness in a murder case and is set to testify against dangerous gang leader VCR's two sons. But Jai backs off when VCR kidnaps Jyoti and blackmails Jai to back off. Things take a violent turn when Jyoti is murdered, and Jai transforms into Shera; the violent alter ego from his past. Shera wages a war on the Drug Mafias and takes the help of Chandola (Gulshan Grover), who was victimized by drugs. Meanwhile; the city faces a gang war between Bakra and VCR. Shera rages in action to annihilate the crime world, but faces one last betrayal in his mission. Muna and Tuna are also henchmen of Chandola.

Shera kills one of the sons of VCR and also starts killing his gang members one by one.Now VCR tries to teach Shera a lesson. Shivani was admitted at hospital and was taking treatment. VCR kidnaps her and blackmails Shera. Shera defeats everyone and succeeded to kill VCR and saves Shivani. After that Shera surrenders himself to the Police and he was sentenced for life, but the crime committed by him was for a good reason so his sentence was reduced to five years.

== Cast ==
- Mithun Chakraborty as Jai Khurana a.k.a. Shera
- Vineetha as Police Inspector Shivani
- Gulshan Grover as Blackie, an underworld don a.k.a. Chandola
- Rami Reddy as Balloo Bakra
- Deepak Shirke as VCR
- Shehzad Khan as Munna
- Gavin Packard as Brownie The Bastard
- Jaya Bhattacharya as Jyoti
- Asrani as Police inspector Bulit Singh
- Hemant Ravan as Vishal
- Kasam Ali as KD
- Ashwin Kaushal as Tuna
- Pushpa Verma as Layla
- Shoiab Khan as Shankie
- Twinkle Singh as Nyehyong
- Vinod Panchal as Kishen
- Bob Christo as Daniel d'Costa

== Music ==
The music was given by Anand–Milind and the lyrics were written by Dev Kohli some of the songs were topped at that time

No.	Title	Playback	Length
1.	"Mehbooba Mehbooba"	Sonu Nigam	4:27
2.	"Mera Pyaasa Dil"	Ranu Mukherjee	4:20
3.	"Shehr Mein Gal Ud Gayee"	Sonu Nigam, Preeti Uttam	4:31
4.	"Hain Tota"	Sukhwinder Singh	4:28
5.	"Ye Dilwaalon Ki Basti Hai"	Ram Shankar, Preeti Uttam	4:39
