= Cheetah (2005 film) =

Chita
- DVD Cover
- Directed by: T. L. V. Prasad
- Written by: Sunil Sharma; Shoba Chandrashekhar (Story); N. K. Salil (Screenplay/Dialogues)
- Produced by: Sunil Sharma
- Starring: Mithun Chakraborty; Rambha; Biplab Chattopadhyay; Kaushik Banerjee
- Music by: Babul Bose
- Release date: 21 January 2005
- Running time: 125 minutes
- Country: India
- Language: Bengali

Cheetah is a 2005 Indian Bengali-language vigilante action film made in Bengali language, directed by T. L. V. Prasad, starring Mithun Chakraborty and Rambha in the lead roles. The film is one among the 26 collaboration between the lead actor Mithun Chakraborty and director T. L. V. Prasad, a record certified by Limca Book of Records.

The film is also popular for its famous dialogue Shaaper chobol aar cheetar khabol, jekhane porbey arai kg mangsho tuley nebe.. (A snake's bite and the leopard's paw, takes out 2.5 kg of flesh wherever it falls on..) delivered by actor Mithun Chakraborty.

== Summary ==
Chita is the story of an honest boy seeking revenge on his father's killers, but to fight and kill them is quite a task as the killers are now influential people in the society.

== Cast ==
- Mithun Chakraborty as Rudranil Mukherjee aka Cheetah
- Rambha as Rupa
- Rajesh Sharma as Insp. Subhamoy Mukherjee
- Kaushik Banerjee as Raghav Rai
- Biplab Chatterjee as Vikram Sinha, a corrupt jailer
- Bharat Kaul as Abhirup Thakur aka Bhargav
- Subhasish Mukherjee as a constable Gobordhan Biswas
- N.K Salil as Nonte / Fonte
- Narugopal Mandal
- Sanjib Dasgupta as Shrivastav
- Ushashree as Insp. Nila Mukherjee
- Krisnendu Chatterjee as Rocky
