= Ustadon Ke Ustad (1998 film) =

- Poster
- Directed by: T. L. V. Prasad
- Written by: Ranbir Pushp
- Produced by: D N Joshi
- Starring: Mithun Chakraborty; Jackie Shroff; Madhoo; Vineetha; Mohan Joshi; Mushtaq Khan; Asrani; Avtar Gill; Govind Namdeo; Tiku Talsania
- Cinematography: D. Prasadbabu
- Edited by: Shyam Mukherji
- Music by: Dilip Sen-Sameer Sen
- Production company: Trishakti Films
- Release date: 20 March 1998
- Running time: 135 minutes
- Country: India
- Language: Hindi

Ustadon Ke Ustad (transl. The expert among all experts) is a 1998 Indian Hindi-language action film directed by T. L. V. Prasad, starring Mithun Chakraborty, Jackie Shroff, Madhoo, Vineetha, Mohan Joshi, Mushtaq Khan, Asrani, Avtar Gill, Govind Namdeo and Tiku Talsania.

== Plot ==
Two friends are turned against each other, as a result of a plan concocted by their enemies. Life didn’t treat Jaikishan kindly. After losing his family and wandering the world, he finally became a thief specializing in diamonds. He was so lucky that he earned the nickname “King Crown”.

But one day, after meeting Kanchan — a girl from a wealthy family — he realized he couldn’t go on living like that and decided to give up his trade. And then Kanchan’s uncle, who had long had his eye on her money, stood in the way of the young couple. To drive the lovers apart, he began to weave intrigues.

== Cast ==
- Mithun Chakraborty as Vishwanath
- Jackie Shroff as Jai Kishan / King Crown
- Madhoo as Kanchan
- Vineetha as Sapna
- Mohan Joshi as Pukhraj Mahadevan
- Mushtaq Khan as Detective Parvez / Cook Ganesham
- Tiku Talsania as Detective Narayan Singh / Shyam/ Cook Chili Chu from Hong Kong
- Jack Gaud as Mahadevan's nephew
- Avtar Gill as IG Gill
- Govind Namdeo as Rudra
- Asrani as John De Sousa(Jai Kishan friend)
- Ram Mohan as Baburao Singh
- Ranbir Pushp as Police Inspector Ranbir Pushp

== Soundtrack ==
#	Title	Singer(s)
1	"Jawani Chaar Dinki"	Poornima, Lalit Sen
2	"Gore Gore Paon Mein"	Udit Narayan, Poornima
3	"Kiya Hoga Allah Jane"	Abhijeet, Anuradha Paudwal
4	"Ustadon Ke Ustad"	Amit Kumar
5	"Nigahen Khul Ke"	Mohammad Aziz, Anuradha Paudwal
6	"Sohny Kudi Sab Nu"	Bali Brahmbhatt, Anuradha Paudwal
