= Jodidar =

- DVD cover
- Directed by: T. L. V. Prasad
- Produced by: Liyaqat Siraj; Vijay Upadhyay
- Starring: Mithun Chakraborty; Raasi; Bindushree; Prem Chopra; Aditya Pancholi
- Cinematography: Navakant
- Music by: Bappi Lahiri
- Production company: Kudasaa
- Release date: 1 March 1997
- Running time: 125 minutes
- Country: India
- Language: Hindi

Jodidar is a 1997 Indian Hindi-language fantasy film directed by T. L. V. Prasad, starring Mithun Chakraborty, Raasi, Bindushree, Aditya Pancholi and Prem Chopra. The film is a remake of the Telugu Blockbuster film Rajendrudu Gajendrudu.

== Plot synopsis ==
Ganesh, an elephant, watches his master being killed by three poachers. After many years, Ganesh is able to identify the killers while being in the service of a new master, Munna.

== Cast ==
- Mithun Chakraborty as Munna "Captain"
- Raasi as Landlord's daughter Mantra
- Bindushree as Arpita, Salesman's wife
- Aditya Pancholi as Forest Officer Suraj
- Prem Chopra as Landlord Natwar Verma
- Shama Deshpande as Sarita, Landlord's wife
- Puneet Issar as Poacher
- Johnny Lever as Agarbatti / Pens / Bangles / Sarees salesman Bhupinder
- Anjana Mumtaz as Munna's mother / Savita
- Paintal as Harshad, Munna's friend
- Vishwajeet Pradhan as Jagdish, Poacher's 2nd brother
- Tej Sapru as Pratap, Poacher's 1st brother

== Music ==
No.	Title	Singer(s)
1	"Tujhse Milan Ka Dil Me"	Alka Yagnik, Bappi Lahiri
2	"Samay Aayega Samay Jayega"	Babul Supriyo, Kavita Krishnamurthy
3	"I Am Mad"	Sudesh Bhosle
4	"Hathi Mera Yaar"	Abhijeet Bhattacharya
5	"Meri Mehboob Tu Bahut Hi Khub Tu"	Preeti Singh, Sonu Nigam
