= Mafia Raaj =

- Poster
- Directed by: Yash Chauhan
- Written by: Amrit Aaryan
- Produced by: Ashok Ratan
- Starring: Mithun Chakraborty; Ayesha Jhulka; Shakti Kapoor; Sadashiv Amrapurkar
- Cinematography: P. Devaraj
- Music by: Dilip Sen-Sameer Sen
- Production company: ABC Movies
- Release date: 11 December 1998
- Running time: 135 minutes
- Country: India
- Language: Hindi

Mafia Raaj is a 1998 Indian Hindi-language crime drama film directed by Yeshwantt and produced by Ashok Ratan, starring Mithun Chakraborty, Ayesha Jhulka, Shakti Kapoor and Sadashiv Amrapurkar.

== Plot ==
Inspector Suraj is successful in maintaining peace and order in his village and is hence transferred to the city to keep the Mafia under control. Suraj moves to the city along with her sister, Chanda. In the city he crosses path with dangerous underworld dons Dhanpat Jaggal and his brother Jacky Jaggal. To teach Suraj a lesson, the duo rape his sister and kill his father. Now Suraj has to go against the law to get his family justice.

== Cast ==
- Mithun Chakraborty as Inspector Suraj
- Ayesha Jhulka as Kanchan
- Shakti Kapoor as Suratmal
- Sadashiv Amrapurkar as Laturkar
- Kiran Kumar as Dhanpat Jagkaal
- Rami Reddy as Babu Bangda
- Aloknath as Lawyer Satyaprakash
- Brij Gopal as Kabir Bangda
- Arjun as Jacky
- Tej Sapru as Inspector Ghag
- Pramod Moutho as Police Commissioner Jumbo
- Karina Grover as Chanda, Suraj’s Sisters an item number (Special Appearance)

== Music ==
1. "Chhoomantar" – Poornima, Bali Brahmabhatt; Sudesh Bhosle
2. "Dilruba Dilruba" – Suchitra Krishnamurthy
3. "Hungama Hai Teri Jawani" – Udit Narayan, Kavita Krishnamurthy
4. "Mainu Laagi Hai Su-Su" – Abhijeet, Sadhana Sargam

== Reception ==
Mukhtar Anjoom of Deccan Herald opined that "Mithun might make perfect business sense to his producers. But, watching him in such supremely stupid roles must be no mean task even to his dwindling fans".
