= Janta Ki Adalat =

- DVD cover
- Directed by: T L V Prasad
- Story by: K.C. Bokadia
- Produced by: K. C. Bokadia
- Starring: Mithun Chakraborty; Gautami; Madhoo; Sadashiv Amrapurkar
- Cinematography: Navakanth
- Music by: Bappi Lahiri
- Production company: BMB Combines
- Release date: 29 July 1994
- Running time: 125 minutes
- Country: India
- Language: Hindi

Janta Ki Adalat (transl. Public court) is a 1994 Indian Hindi-language action film directed by T L V Prasad and produced by K. C. Bokadia, starring Mithun Chakraborty. It is a remake of Tamil film Mutrugai. It was the first movie of TLV Prasad with Mithun Chakraborty. Later on TLV Prasad went on to work with Mithun for 30 movies within a span of 8 years for which the duo registered their name in the Limca book of world records for the highest number of successful movies between an actor and director without a break in such a short time. The movie was also successful at the box office since it was made at a modest budget.

== Plot ==
Shankar's lover Malathi commits suicide when the head of the local administration tried to rape her. Accused of murdering Shankar, who has long put a stick in the wheels of corrupt officials. Shankar goes to prison, from where he escapes to restore justice.

== Cast ==
- Mithun Chakraborty as Shankar
- Gautami as Police inspector Jyoti
- Madhoo as Malathi
- Sadashiv Amrapurkar as Minister Manjit Khurana
- Asrani as Bankhe
- Laxmikant Berde as Tukia
- Alok Nath as Police Commissioner Kailash Kapoor
- Shiva Rindani as Corrupt Police Inspector Rana
- Sulbha Arya as Aunty of Shankar
- Nizhalgal Ravi as DIG Kiran Kumar
- Ram-Lakshman as Manohar, Manjit's henchmen
- Gollapudi Maruti Rao as Governor

== Soundtrack ==
This album is composed by Bappi Lahiri, Lyrics by Maya Govind, Anwar Sagar, Nawab Arzoo. most popular songs in album "Dil Ki Halat", "Dil Dhadakne Ka", "Tere Har Sawal" etc.

1. Dil Ki Halat" - Kumar Sanu, Kavita Krishnamurthy
2. "Dil Dhadakne Ka" - Kumar Sanu, Sadhana Sargam
3. "Tere Har Sawal" - Sudesh Bhosle, Ila Arun
4. "Koyal Bolen Kyun" - Kavita Krishnamurthy
5. "Man Mein Kuch Aur" - Kumar Sanu, Kavita Krishnamurthy
6. "Dil Mein Kya Hain" - Roop Kumar Rathod, Alka Yagnik
