= Sultaan =

- Poster
- Directed by: T L V Prasad
- Produced by: Amit Kumar
- Starring: Mithun Chakraborty; Dharmendra; Suvarna Mathew; Jack Gaud; Raza Murad; Mukesh Rishi
- Music by: Bappi Lahiri; Aadesh Srivastav
- Release date: 17 March 2000
- Running time: 120 minutes
- Country: India
- Language: Hindi

Sultaan is a 2000 Indian Hindi-language action film directed by T L V Prasad and produced by Amit Kumar, starring Mithun Chakraborty, Suvarna Mathew, Jack Gaud, Mukesh Rishi and Dharmendra in a special appearance. The film is a remake of the Telugu film Sultan. It was released on 17 March 2000 and failed at the box office.

== Plot ==
Don Kabira helps Ayesha save her garage from local goons and hides the fact that he once used to be an honest inspector. However, Ayesha decides to find out the reason for his transformation.

== Cast ==
- Mithun Chakraborty as Abhimanyu - Sultan
- Dharmendra as Sultan Raksh Baksh
- Suvarna Mathew as Ayesha
- Vikas Anand as Balram, Abhimanyu's dad
- Birbal as Driver
- Jack Gaud as Jay Shankar
- Raza Murad as Veer Badra Rudra Narayan
- Yunus Parvez as Shaukat
- Shiva Rindani as Kaliya Shankar
- Mukesh Rishi as Rup Shankar
- Tej Sapru as Inspector V. K. Rokade
- Shaina as Ayesha
- Tiku Talsania as Chaturbuj

== Music ==
The music was composed by Bappi Lahiri and Aadesh Srivastav:

1. "Gore Badan Pe Yaar Kurti Kassi Kassi" - Ila Arun, Sapna Awasthi
2. "Hai Soni Kudi Namkeen Badi" - Kavita Krishnamurthy, Bali Brahmabhatt
3. "Kya Baat Ha" - Kumar Sanu, Alka Yagnik
4. "Sultaan" - Bappi Lahiri, Jaspinder Narula

== Release ==
Initially, this film and Zahreela, another Mithun film, were to release on 31 December 1999.
