= Jallaad =

- Theatrical Poster
- Directed by: T. L. V. Prasad
- Screenplay by: T. L. V. Prasad
- Dialogues: Bengali: Pallab Roy; Hindi: Anirudh Tiwari
- Story by: Prafulla Roy; Manivannan
- Based on: Amaidhi Padai by Manivannan
- Produced by: Rajiv Babbar
- Starring: Mithun Chakraborty; Moushumi Chatterjee; Madhoo; Rambha
- Cinematography: Navkant
- Edited by: D. N. Malik
- Music by: Anand–Milind
- Production company: Aabha Films
- Distributed by: Aabha Films
- Release dates: 8 September 1995 (Bengali); 15 September 1995 (Hindi)
- Running time: 161 minutes
- Country: India
- Languages: Bengali; Hindi

Jallaad (/ˈd͡ʒæl.lɑːd/ transl. Executioner) is a 1995 Indian bilingual political action thriller film directed by T. L. V. Prasad, simultaneously shot in Bengali and Hindi languages. Produced by Rajiv Babbar under the banner of Aabha Films, the film is inspired by Uttam Kumar starrer Bagh Bondi Khela (1975), while its core plot is based on Tamil film Amaidhipadai (1994). The film stars Mithun Chakraborty in a dual roles as father and son in opposing characters – the son has a positive role, whereas the father plays the main villain. The movie won him several awards in the Best Actor in a Negative Role category. It was Rambha's Bollywood debut. The film was unofficially remade in Bangladeshi as Thanda Mathar Khuni (2006).

== Plot ==
An honest diligent police inspector named Kranti Kumar lives with his grandparents. On one of his missions, he is sent to the South where he falls in love with a village girl named Koyal who lives with her parents and little sister, Munni. Koyal reciprocates his love. Delighted at Kranti Kumar, Koyal's parents also accept their love and decide to announce their wedding.

Suddenly during their engagement, a mysterious man named Gopinath asks Kranti Kumar about his lifestyle. Gopinath then reveals that he is a bastard son of a corrupt politician Amavas and mocks Kranti Kumar for not knowing about his parents. An enraged Kranti Kumar beats Gopinath until his grandfather reveals the truth.

Amavas was a poor, but arrogant beggar who became acquainted with Kamalkant, a corrupt politician. Soon Amavas becomes Kamal's right hand man and a young village girl named Gayatri Devi falls for him to whom he reciprocates, but he drugs and seduces her into sex one day. Kamal orders Amavas to stand in politics as an independent candidate because Kamal has not been given a ticket from his party. Amavas changes his name to Vijay Bahadur Kunwar in order to gain status and power much to the shock of Kamal and starts campaigning. Through Kamal's crafty machinations, Amavas wins the election, but forgets Kamal's help and forces Kamal to become his crony. After some days, Gayatri Devi gets pregnant and reveals the good news to Amavas. But Amavas cheats and disowns her and her baby. A furious Gayatri Devi goes to a temple, stands in front of Kali idol and vows that her son will avenge her humiliation and death. She grabs the trident and tries to kill herself. But as a result, she dies giving birth to her son Kranti. She is buried in a graveyard and the grave was made as famous in a village. Meanwhile, Amavas marries another lady, Tara who is a daughter of a rich landlord and steals the latter's palace. Tara, seeing his corruption refuses to bear him children.

When Kranti discovers the truth about his parents, he vows to kill his father to avenge his mother. He investigates two villagers and discovers his mother's grave. There Kranti meets his stepmother, Tara. After seeing Kranti's face, Tara learns that he is the son of Amavas. Kranti accepts her as his second mother and they vow to bring down Amavas.

One day Kranti sees Amavas. Some goons tries to attack Amavas, but Kranti fires on the goons and save his father and Amavas thanks him for saving his life. The same night, Kranti goes to Amavas's palace and reveals his identity to his father. When Amavas see Kranti's face, he realizes he is his own son. Kranti tells his father he will not spare him for his mother's death, a threat Amavas brushes off.

Over the years, Amavas has become a notorious dirty politician who doesn't serve the people. He continues to enjoy power and prestige. Discovering that Tara and Kranti are plotting his downfall, Amavas orders his slave Bhola to kill his second wife. Bhola is hesitant, but hardens his heart to follow his master's order. When Bhola comes to kill Tara, she tries to escape. She calls to her son Kranti, but Bhola stabs her. Kranti arrives there, but it was too late as Tara dies in Kranti's arms. The next day, Tara's dead body was kept at the funeral and knowing that his father was the cause, Kranti charges at Amavas and beats him mercilessly. As a result, Kranti is arrested and jailed.

For his final diabolical plan, Amavas orders Bhola to bring Koyal to his chamber. Kamal, who by this time is fed up of being Amavas' crony and wants to turn a new leaf, protests and tries to protect Koyal, but he is murdered by Bhola. Amavas' henchmen also kidnap Koyal's little sister. Upon the advice of a corrupt priest who tells Amavas that he is going to die soon, Amavas decides to forcibly marry Koyal through a demonic ritual. When Kranti discovers the news, he fights with the police and escapes from jail. He eliminates all of Amavas's henchmen and saves Koyal and her little sister Munni. After brutally beating his father, Kranti has Amavas at his mercy. He takes a trident and impales his father the same way his mother killed herself. Unrepentant to the end and blessing himself with flowers, Amavas's final words before he dies are "Amavas Zindabad".

After Amavas's death, Kranti Kumar surrenders to the police and he is sentenced for three years in jail. After he is released, he marries Koyal and they live happily ever after.

== Cast ==
- Mithun Chakraborty in dual roles as
  - Vijay Bahadur "Amavas" Kunwar
  - Kranti Kumar
- Moushumi Chatterjee as Tara
- Madhoo as Gayatri
- Rambha as Koyel
- Kader Khan as Kamalakanta "K. K."
- Avtar Gill as Gopinath
- Puneet Issar as Bhola
- Goga Kapoor as Aghori Baba
- Tiku Talsania as Inspector
- Tej Sapru as Inspector
- Yunus Parvez
- Gurbachan Singh
- Shakti Kapoor as Shakti Jackson/ Gabbar (special appearance)
- Prem Chopra (special appearance)
- Sonu Walia in the item number "Aankhon Mein Kya Hai"

== Soundtrack ==
Jallaad included 6 songs – all songs composed by Anand–Milind with lyrics penned by Pulak Bandyopadhyay and Pradyot Ghosh for the Bengali version, and Sameer for the Hindi version. The songs topped the charts when released.

=== Bengali version ===
Track listing
No.	Title	Lyrics	Singer(s)	Length
1.	"Chokhete Ajob Dipti Tomar"	Pulak Bandyopadhyay	Vinod Rathod, Sapna Mukherjee	5:47
2.	"Olpo Olpo Kothar majhe"	Pradyot Ghosh	Udit Narayan, Sadhana Sargam	4:41
3.	"Bichher Kamore Bishakto Je"	Pradyot Ghosh	Alka Yagnik	4:34
4.	"Kajol Kalo Premer Othoi"	Pulak Bandyopadhyay	Kumar Sanu, Sadhana Sargam	5:15
5.	"Are Baba Chhnuyo Naa"	Pradyot Ghosh	Abhijeet Bhattacharya, Poornima	4:53
6.	"Jai Maa Kaali"	Pulak Bandyopadhyay		5:34
Total length:				31:01

=== Hindi version ===
Track listing
No.	Title	Singer(s)	Length
1.	"Aankhon Mein Kya Hai"	Vinod Rathod, Sapna Mukherjee	5:47
2.	"Chinai Chun Chun"	Udit Narayan, Sadhana Sargam	4:41
3.	"Bichhwa Bole"	Alka Yagnik	4:34
4.	"Tumhe Hum Bahut Pyaar Karne Lage"	Hariharan, Sadhana Sargam	5:15
5.	"Haath Na Lagaana"	Abhijeet Bhattacharya, Poornima	4:53
6.	"Jai Jai Jai Kaali"		5:34
Total length:			31:01

== Accolades ==
Awards	Category	Recipient(s)	Result
41st Filmfare Awards	Filmfare Award for Best Performance in a Negative Role	Mithun Chakraborty	Won
Screen Awards	Screen Award for Best Actor in a Negative Role	Mithun Chakraborty	Won
