= Muqadar =

- Film poster
- Directed by: T L V Prasad
- Story by: Sanjay Kumar
- Produced by: Rajiv Babbar
- Starring: Mithun Chakraborty; Ayesha Jhulka; Simran; Moushumi Chatterjee; Hemant Birje; Puneet Issar; Kiran Kumar
- Cinematography: Navakant
- Edited by: Shyam Mukherjee; D N Malik
- Music by: Anand Milind
- Production company: Aabha Films
- Release date: 12 July 1996
- Running time: 181 min.
- Country: India
- Language: Hindi

Muqadar (transl. Destiny) is a 1996 Indian Hindi-language action drama film produced by Rajiv Babbar and directed by T L V Prasad. It stars Mithun Chakraborty, Puneet Issar and Kiran Kumar and Moushumi Chatterjee in the lead role with Simran, Ayesha Jhulka and Hemant Birje in supporting roles.

== Plot ==
Shiva always believed in making his own destiny. So when he fell in love with Meena, daughter of his arch-rival and enemy Parashuram, he knew he was inviting trouble. But Shiva married her. Parshuram could not bear the humiliation and decides to destroy Shiva. The city trembled when these two underworld heavyweights clashed. The gang war between the rival gang of Parshuram Shiva rocked the city. Additional Commissioner of Police S. K. Khurana is appointed to bring the city back to normal. Shiva decides to eliminate the ACP. Shiva plants a bomb. Just when he is going to activate the bomb, he sees S. K. Khurana accompanied with his wife Bharati and his daughter Pooja. Shiva does not activate the bomb, despite his hatred for his mother Bharati, Shiva is unable to kill her. Bharati goes to find out about Shiva. She goes to meet him. Shiva humiliates Bharati. He cannot pardon Bharati for having abandoned him for his happiness. Although Shiva was alive she had accepted that he was dead. No one knows what destiny has in store for each one of them. Pooja conceives a child. S. K. Khurana opposes Pooja's marriage to a criminal's son. Bharati once again comes to Shiva for help. But, will Shiva pardon his mother? Will he help her? Will Parashuram be able to settle the score? Shiva had never accepted his destiny's decision, is he able to change it this time? These questions form the rest of the story.

== Cast ==
- Mithun Chakraborty as Shiva
- Ayesha Jhulka as Meena
- Simran as Pooja
- Moushumi Chatterjee as Bharati
- Hemant Birje as Sudhir
- Puneet Issar as Parashuram
- Rohit Kumar as Rohit
- Kiran Kumar as Commissioner of Police S.K. Khurana
- Asrani as Jackson
- Gavin Packard as Gavin

== Music ==
#	Title	Singer(s)	Length	Music
1	"Dil Hai Tera Jaan Hai Teri Mai Hu Teri"	Kumar Sanu, Alka Yagnik	6:09	Anand–Milind
2	"Atom Bomb Atom Bomb"	Abhijeet, Alka	5:03	Anand–Milind
3	"Chal Kahi Chale Sajna"	Suresh Wadkar, Bela Sulakhe	5:23	Anand–Milind
4	"Chudiya Bajau Ke Bajau Kagana"	Abhijeet, Poornima	6:30	Anand–Milind
5	"Tataiya Bole Tu Tu Tu"	Sadhana Sargam, Vinod Rathod	5:21	Anand–Milind
6	"Ke Ke Chemistry"	Shankar Mahadevan, Parvez, Gayatri Ganjawala	4:29	Anand–Milind
7	"Shiva Shiva"	Chorus	-	-

== Reception ==
Most of Mithun's 1996 releases were successful as they followed the low-budget formula. Muqadar was a satisfying success at the box-office helping producers and distributors.
