= Chandaal =

- Film Release Poster
- Directed by: T. L. V. Prasad
- Written by: T. L. V. Prasad; Anirudh Tiwari (dialogues)
- Produced by: Rajiv Babbar
- Starring: Mithun Chakraborty; Rami Reddy; Hemant Birje; Avtar Gill
- Cinematography: D. Prasadbabu
- Edited by: D. N. Malik
- Music by: Anand–Milind
- Production company: Aabha Films
- Release date: 13 March 1998
- Running time: 180 minutes
- Country: India
- Language: Hindi
- Budget: ₹2 crore

Chandaal is a 1998 Hindi-language Indian action drama film directed by T. L. V. Prasad and produced by Rajiv Babbar starring Mithun Chakraborty, Avtar Gill, Puneet Issar and Hemant Birje in lead roles.

== Plot ==
Indrajeet is an honest police officer happily living with his family. His sister loves one young fellow; subsequently, it is revealed that he was the brother of local don Durjan Rai Sahab Singh. When Indrajeet arrests Durjan Singh with his gangs, he took revenge and kills all the family members of Indrajeet and fabricated a false murder case against him. He was sent into prison for committing the death of his parents and sister. After releasing from jail, he worked in a burning ghat. In these courses, he met with a young brave lady journalist who was chased by the gang of don. Indrajeet saved her and fall in love with the journalist. With her help, he started killing Durjan Singh's gang for taking revenge. Indrajeet's subordinate police officer Khurana, was honest but could not find any evidence against him.

== Cast ==
- Mithun Chakraborty as Police Inspector Indrajeet a.k.a. Chandaal
- Sneha as Sneha(introducing)
- Rami Reddy as Durjan Rai Sahab Singh
- Puneet Issar as Police Inspector Khurana
- Hemant Birje as Hemant brother of Rai Sahab
- Jack Gaud as Jack
- Avtar Gill as Pratap Indrajeet's father
- Asrani as Khairatlal Chandaal(Guest Appearance)
- Altaf Raja as a Singer(Very Special Appearance)
- Emisha Nagi as Sneha's friend
- Kasam Ali as Chandrankat son of Rai Sahab
- Ashwin Kaushal as Ashwin son of Rai Sahab
- Lekha Govil as Naina Indrajeet's mother
- Pinky Chenoy as Mina Indrajeet's sister
- Twinkal Singh as Kanchan is a girl at the cemetery
- Anirudh Tiwari
- Anand as Senior Police Inspector
- Jeetendra Gangawane as Jet Singh illegitimate son of Rai Sahab
- Ratan Kumar as Ratan Kumar producer
- Vinod Panchal
- Kanan as Judge
- Amrish
- Vani Verma as Geeta
- Priti Mehta as Savita Khurana wife

== Music ==
The music was given by Anand–Milind

#	Title	Singer(s)
1	"Karlo Pyaar Karlo Pyaar"	Altaf Raja, Jaspinder Narula
2	"Peg Patiyala Ka"	Sonu Nigam, Jaspinder Narula
3	"Buk Chuk"	Abhijeet
4	"Chain Chabila Balma Mera Mange Rashmalayee"	Vinod Rathod, Poornima
5	"Chod de Janeman"	Poornima
6	"Karlo Pyaar"	Altaf Raja
