= Aaag Hi Aag =

1999 film by T. L. V. Prasad

- Directed by: T. L. V. Prasad
- Written by: Shiraz Ahmad (Screenplay), Bashir Babbar (Dialogue).
- Produced by: Vaibhavi Bafna, Yash Bafna, O.P. Goyle
- Starring: Mithun Chakraborty; Jackie Shroff
- Cinematography: S. Naidu
- Edited by: Prakash Dave
- Music by: Babul Bose
- Release date: 1999
- Country: India
- Language: Hindi

Aaag Hi Aag is 1999 Hindi language action movie directed by T L V Prasad and starring Mithun Chakraborty, Jackie Shroff, Sneha, Aloknath Dixit, Payal Malhotra, Rajiv Raj, Kiran Kumar, and Laxmikant Berde.

== Plot ==
This is the story of two men's clash with underworld Dons to free the society from anti social elements. Ajay and Ravi are fighting against the lawless activities of Mafia king Tiger.

== Cast ==
- Mithun Chakraborty as Inspector Ajay Singh
- Jackie Shroff as Ravi
- Raj Kiran as Inspector Jwala Singh
- Ranjeet as Gopal Bharti
- Tej Sapru as Akash Sharma
- Sneha as Angeli
- Aloknath Dixit (Guest Appearance)
- Payal Malhotra as Shalu
- Rajiv Raj
- Tina as Diana
- Kiran Kumar as Police Commissioner / Gorakh Singh "Tiger"
- Laxmikant Berde as Baba Bakwas Kalandar (Guest Appearance)
- Suresh Chatwal as J.K. - Rocky's Father
- Mac Mohan as Tony

== Soundtrack ==
Music: Babul Bose, Lyrics: Nawab Arzoo

1. " Aag Hi Aag Hai Paani Mein" – Vinod Rathod, Jolly Mukherjee, Richa Sharma, Tina
2. " Teri Chaahat Ki Kasam" – Udit Narayan, Kavita Krishnamurthy
3. "Jab Tera Ishq Mila" (Duet) - Udit Narayan, Alka Yagnik
4. " Jab Tera Ishq Mila" (Female) - Alka Yagnik
5. " Yeh Yeh Kya Hua" - Arun Bakshi, Alka Yagnik
6. "Tujhe Apna Banaaneko Waiting" - Abhijeet, Alka Yagnik
