= Hatyara (1998 film) =

1998 Indian Hindi-language crime film

- DVD cover
- Directed by: T. L. V. Prasad
- Written by: T. L. V. Prasad; Mahendra Dhariwal (dialogues)
- Produced by: Mahendra Dhariwal; Shisupal Singh
- Starring: Mithun Chakraborty; Suman Ranganathan; Swathi; Rami Reddy; Mukesh Rishi; Anil Dhawan
- Cinematography: Navakant; Ramakrishna
- Edited by: Shyam Mukherjee
- Music by: Dilip Sen-Sameer Sen
- Production company: Makewell Films International
- Release date: 15 May 1998
- Running time: 135 minutes
- Country: India
- Language: Hindi

Hatyara is a 1998 Indian Hindi-language crime film directed by T. L. V. Prasad, starring Mithun Chakraborty in a dual role alongside Suman Ranganathan and Swathi in her Bollywood debut.

== Plot ==
Professor Kajal (Swathi) witnesses the rape and murder of a student by the brother of gangster Singhania (Rami Reddy). When she reports the crime, police refuse to act due to Singhania's influence. Kajal's husband, disabled advocate Mahendra (Mithun Chakraborty), fights for justice in court. After Kajal refuses to withdraw the case, Singhania's gang rapes and murders her. Mahendra then teams with his lookalike brother Surya (also Chakraborty) to exact revenge, systematically killing Singhania's gang before surrendering to police.

== Cast ==
- Mithun Chakraborty as dual role
  - Advocate Mahendra: Surya's elder brother
  - Surya: Mahendra's younger brother
- Suman Ranganathan as Suman
- Swathi as Prof. Kajal
- Rami Reddy as Shishupal Singhania
- Mukesh Rishi as Singhania's brother
- Anil Dhawan in a supporting role
- Paintal as Pandey
- Kishore Anand Bhanushali
- Baby Ann as Mahendra's daughter

== Soundtrack ==
Hatyara

Soundtrack album by Dilip Sen-Sameer Sen
- Released: February 1998
- Label: Pen Audio

1. "Gore Gore Galo Wali" - Abhijeet, Poornima
2. "Chick Lampo Lalaji" - Udit Narayan, Kavita Krishnamurthy
3. "O Sanam Tu Le Kasam" - Kumar Sanu, Sapna Mukherjee
4. "Laal Batti Ke" - Kumar Sanu
5. "Main Ladki Aur Ladka Tum" - Poornima
6. "Aaja Main Seekha Doon" - Lalit Sen, Shweta Shetty
