= T. L. V. Prasad =

Indian film director

T L V Prasad
- Born: Tatineni Leela Vara Prasad; 21 March 1959 (age 67); Vijayawada, Madras State, India
- Other names: Vara Prasad; Leela V Prasad; Tatineni Prasad
- Occupations: Film director, film producer, screenwriter
- Children: Tatineni Satya
- Parent: T. Prakash Rao
- Relatives: T. Rama Rao

T. L. V. Prasad is an Indian film director who predominantly worked in Hindi and Telugu cinema.. He is the director of nearly 70 Hindi films and 35 Telugu films. He also directed a few films in Bengali cinema.

== Career ==
He is the son of noted Telugu director T. Prakash Rao. He started his career by assisting V. Madhusudhana Rao and made his directorial debut in 1980 with the Telugu film, Kudi Edamaithe. His Bollywood career started in 1992, with I Love You. His name is included in Limca Book of Records, as one director doing so many numbers of films with one hero (Mithun) without a break in a short span. He did four Bengali Films with Mithun in 2004. He was one of the prominent directors for Mithun's popular Mithun's Dream Factory.

== Filmography ==
=== Telugu ===
- Kudi Edamaithe - Nutan Prasad, Phataphat Jayalakshmi
- Challenge Ramudu - N. T. Rama Rao, Jaya Prada
- Rani Kasula Rangamma - Chiranjeevi, Sridevi
- Tingu Rangadu - Chiranjeevi, Geetha
- Manishiko Charitra - Murali Mohan, Suhasini
- Manishiki MaroPeru - Chandra Mohan, Tulasi
- Ee Teerpu Illalidi - Mohan Babu, Sujata
- Illali Pareeksha - Mohan Babu, Bhanupriya
- Illale Devata - Akkineni Nageswara Rao, Radhika
- Disco King - Balakrishna, Tulasi
- Palnati Puli - Balakrishna, Bhanupriya
- Naagu - Chiranjeevi, Radha
- Subha Muhoortam - Murali Mohan, Suhasini
- Ramanayamlo Bhagavatam - Gollapudi Maruti Rao, Bhanupriya
- Aakrandana - Chandra Mohan, Jayasudha
- Dharmapatni - Suman, Bhanupriya
- Maa Inti Mahalakshmi - Mohan Babu, Radha
- Paragitha - Anand Babu, Jayasudha
- Ragam Talam Pallavi - Chandra Mohan
- Qaidi Dada - Suman, Radha
- Illali Pratigya - Naresh, Tulasi

=== Hindi and Bengali ===
Year	Title	Language
1992	I Love You	Hindi
1994	Janta Ki Adalat	Hindi
1995	Zakhmi Sipahi	Hindi
1995	Jallaad	Hindi/Bengali
1996	Muqadar	Hindi
1996	Jurmana	Hindi
1996	Daanveer	Hindi
1996	Rangbaaz	Hindi
1997	Jodidar	Hindi
1997	Kaalia	Hindi
1997	Suraj	Hindi
1998	Sher-E-Hindustan	Hindi
1998	Chandaal	Hindi
1998	Hatyara	Hindi
1998	Ustadon Ke Ustad	Hindi
1998	Hitler	Hindi
1998	Do Numbri	Hindi
1999	Sikandar Sadak Ka	Hindi
1999	Ganga Ki Kasam	Hindi
1999	Benaam	Hindi
1999	Aaag Hi Aag	Hindi
1999	Shera	Hindi
1999	Phool Aur Aag	Hindi
1999	Dada	Hindi
2000	Sultaan	Hindi
2000	Qurbaniyaan	Hindi
2001	Bhairav	Hindi
2002	Qaidi	Hindi
2002	Meri Partigya	Hindi
2002	Mawali No.1	Hindi
2004	Barood	Bengali
2005	Devdoot	Bengali
2005	Dada	Bengali
2005	Tauba Tauba	Hindi
2005	Chita	Bengali
2008	Aaj Ka Boss	Hindi

=== Marathi ===
- Vrundavan (2016)

=== Television ===
- Jai Jai Jai Bajrang Bali (Sahara One)
- Jai Shri Krishna (Sahara One)

== Notes ==
- Source:Details at ApunKaChoice
