= Poornima (singer) =

Indian singer

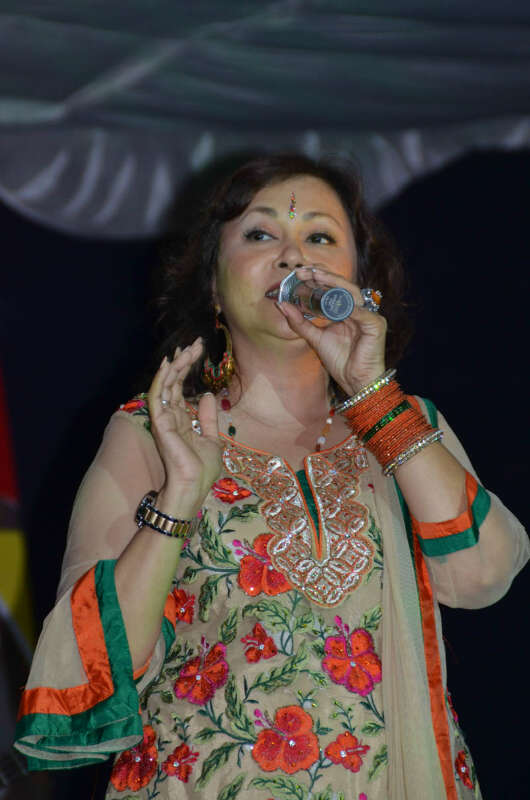
- Poornima performing in 2013

Background information
- Born: Sushma Shrestha; Bombay, Maharashtra, India
- Genre: Playback
- Occupation: Singer
- Years active: 1971–present

Poornima (born as Sushma Shrestha) is an Indian playback singer. Starting as a child artist, she became a leading playback singer in Bollywood during the 1990s.

== Early life ==
Hailing from the Newar community from Nepal, Poornima was born as an Indian in Mumbai. Her father was music composer Bholanath Shrestha, who worked primarily with Hindi film music directors. He was from Kathmandu and settled in Kolkata and eventually in Mumbai.

== Career ==
Her father’s friend and assistant to noted music director Shankar–Jaikishan recommended her to Shankar. In spite of the prevailing custom of women playback singers singing for children, Shankar took the challenge of using an unknown child to sing "Hai Na Bolo Bolo" for the film Andaz. Sushama recorded her first song on 11 November 1969 with Mohammed Rafi and Suman Kalyanpur. She was the first successful child singer in Hindi films. She recorded a children's album called Bal Geet, which had Shrinivas Khale composing the songs and Shanta Shelke penning the lyrics. She sang four songs in it. The album proved a hit and gave her exposure. She also sang Marathi songs with ease.

Her career was planned to be launched at a function organised by the Punjab Association organised by Raj Kapoor, Pran and others.Tragedy struck the day before when her father suffered a cardiac arrest and died. She was undaunted and was encouraged by family and friends. She admitted to “almost giving up on her career for family”. She gave a performance that impressed many and enabled her to get a music scholarship. She later sang many hit songs in her childhood, including "Jaane Tu Ya Jaane Na". Music director R.D. Burman gave her some of her most memorable songs, "Ek Din Bik Jayega Mati Ki Mol", "Yaadoon Ki Baaraat", "Teri Hai Zameen Tera Aasman", "Tera Mujhse Hai Pehle" and "Kya Hua Tera Vada"; the later two earned her nominations for the Filmfare Best Female Playback Award becoming the youngest nominee in the category at the age of 11. She has acknowledged his contribution in her singing career:

"R.D Burman was my guru and whatever I know of singing is thanks to him."

Poornima's early start gave her the chance to work with Naushad, Madan Mohan, C. Ramchandra, Salil Choudhury, Anil Biswas, Kalyanji-Anandji, Laxmikant–Pyarelal, S.D. Burman, and Shankar-Jaikishan.

She struggled as an adult singer during the mid 80s. Her marriage put a temporary halt to her singing career. Her last song as Sushma Shreshtha was in N.Chandra's Ankush with devotional classic "Itni Shakti Humein Dena Data" (along with main singer Pushpa Pagdhare. Jingles took her attention where the professionalism made her settle to a steady work schedule.

In the 1990s, music company Tips suggested a change of name and image. Sushma took the name Poornima. Her song "Barsaat Mein Jab Aayega Saawan Ka Maheena" from Maa was a hit. Then came David Dhawan's Bol Radha Bol. "Tu Tu Tu Tu Tara" became an anthem and the remaining songs also succeeded. She continued her association with Dhawan and sang for all his No. 1 series including Haseena Maan Jayegi and Biwi No.1.

As an adult she sang for many music directors including Chitragupt, Laxmikant-Pyarelal, Bappi Lahiri, Rajesh Roshan, M. S. Vishwanathan, Ravindra Jain, Anand-Milind, Anu Malik, Jatin–Lalit, Raamlaxman, Nadeem-Shravan, M.M.Kreem, Lesle Lewis, Viju Shah, Anand Raj Anand, Nikhil-Vinay, Vishal–Shekhar, Dilip Sen -Sameer Sen, Sukhwinder Singh, Ghulam Ali, Jeet-Pritam, Aadesh Shrivastava and Mani Sharma.

She sang popular numbers such as "Channe Ke Khet Main" from Anjaam, "Batti Na Bujha" from Gopi Kishan (both 1994), "Shaam Hain Dhuan Dhuan" from Diljale (1996), "Mr Lova Lova" from Ishq (1999) and in a series of David Dhawan films like such as Coolie No. 1 (1995), Judwaa (1997), Hero No. 1 (1997) and Biwi No.1 (1999) amongst others.

She sang for actresses including Sridevi, Jaya Prada, Juhi Chawla, Madhuri Dixit, Sarika, Manisha Koirala, Simi Garewal, Deepti Naval, Ramya Krishnan, Rambha, Sushmita Sen, Shilpa Shirodkar, Karishma Kapoor, Raveena Tandon, Kajol, Rani Mukherji, Madhu, Tabu, Preity Zinta, Ayesha Jhulka, Shilpa Shetty, Sonali Bendre and Mamta Kulkarni.

Poornima was one of the top-ten selling 1990s artists with her album Mera Dil Bole Piya Piya. Throughout the 1990s, Poormina along with Alka Yagnik and Kavita Krishnamurthy were the most prolific female playback singers.

No longer active in film playback singing, she performs live in India and other parts of the world.

Poornima has sung in many languages including Bengali, Nepali, Marathi, Bhojpuri, Punjabi, Gujarati, Oriya, Rajasthani, Assamese, Haryanvi, Garhwali and Arabic. Apart from films, she has sung numerous songs in genres such as Baal Geet (children's songs), Bhavgeet, Bhajan, Ghazal, Chutney and Indipop.

== Television ==
Poornima was one of the judges in the third season of singing reality show Bharat Ki Shaan: Singing Star, which aired on Doordarshan in primetime. She was also a judge in Bhojpuri language singing reality show Zilla Top which aired on Mahuaa TV.

== Selected discography ==
=== Non-film albums ===
- Balgeet (Composer - Shrinivas Khale)
- Hasa Milano Hasa Baal Geete (Composer - C. Ramachandra)
- Marathi Disco
- Gujarati Geet
- Chutney Garbar
- Simply Darun
- Ankh Micholi
- Balma Bada Bavaali
- Jaal
- Bhatta Saheb
- Badal
- Jogan
- Patanga
- Shagufa
- Hello Hi
- Maashuka Bulbul (Composer - Lesle Lewis)
- Maiya Naiyya Taar Le
- Maiya Bhavani
- Maa Ka Darshan
- Chalo Darbar
- Raja Na Awjai
- Shudhu Monay Rekho
- Chutney Garbar
- Mera Dil Bole Piya Piya
- Beti Chalal Sasurar
- Bijuri Kaha Giri
- Navrya Ghari Maajhi Lekh Chal
- Sun Sharabi
- Ae Samdhi Ke Bete
- Abbe Daalab
- Tohke Chadhaib Laal Ohaar
- Goriya
- Sawan Aya Re
- Aartiyan

=== Film ===
Year	Film	Language	Song name	Composer	Notes
1971	Andaz	Hindi	"Hai Na Bolo Bolo"	Shankar–Jaikishan	As Sushma Shrestha
1972	Koshish	Hindi	"Humse Hai Watan Hamara"	Madan Mohan	
1972	Mere Bhaiya	Hindi	"Mere Bhaiya"	Salil Chaudhary	
1972	Janwar Aur Insaan	Hindi	"Aao Milke Sathi Banke Khele"	Kalyanji-Anandji	
1973	Jugnu	Hindi	"Deep Diwali Ke Jhute"	S.D. Burman	
1973	Aa Gale Lag Jaa	Hindi	"Tera Mujhse Hain Pehle Ka Nata Koi" / "Aye Mere Bete"	Rahul Dev Burman	Nominated -Filmfare Award for Best Female Playback Singer for ""Tera Mujhse Hain"
1975	Sunehra Sansar	Hindi	"Meri Jawani Meri Dushman Bani Re"	Naushad	
1975	Zakhmee	Hindi	"Aao Tumhe Chand Pe Le Jayen (Happy)" / "Aao Tumhe Chand Pe Le Jayen (Sad)"	Bappi Lahiri	
1975	Dharam Karam	Hindi	"Na Ho Bas Mein Tere" / "Ek Din Bik Jayega Mati Ke Mol (Sad)"	Rahul Dev Burman	
1975	Barah Ghante	Hindi	“Gun Gun Gaa Pankh Pakheru”	M. S. Vishwanathan	
1977	Hum Kisise Kum Naheen	Hindi	"Kya Hua Tera Wada"	Rahul Dev Burman	Nominated – Filmfare Award for Best Female Playback Singer
1978	Pati Patni Aur Woh	Hindi	"Thande Thande Pani Se Nahana Chahiye"	Ravindra Jain	
1980	The Burning Train	Hindi	"Teri Hai Zameen Tera Aasman"	Rahul Dev Burman	
1980	Sindoor	Nepali	"Ali ali haar ho" / "Nakkali he nakkali..."	Nati Kaji, Shiv Shankar	Co singer- Udit Narayan his first playback song
1981	Yaarana	Hindi	“Yaarana Yaar Ka Toote Kabhi Na”	Rajesh Roshan	
1982	"Juni"	Nepali	Title and other songs	Suresh Kumar	
1985	Ghar Dwaar	Hindi	“Koi Jaaye Kashi”	Chitragupt	
1986	Ankush	Hindi	"Itni Shakti Humein Dena Data"	Kuldeep Singh	Last song as Sushma Shrestha
1989	Santaan	Nepali	"Kahawase aaibe Raam-Lachhuman" / "Piratii ko kitaab maa naulo paanaa thapchhaun"	Manohari Singh	Co-singers- Udit Narayan, Deepa Narayan Jha (Gahatraj), Prasaad Shrestha
1990	Tilhari	Nepali	"Nilo Nilo tyo aakaash" / "Dhartee bharee khojdaa khojdaa"	Jeewan Adhikari	Co-singer- Suresh Wadkar
1991	Kanyadaan	Nepali	”Dhiki-chyau dhiki-chyau ghwaar ghwaar jaanto” / “Gaau swor kholera didi ra bahini” / “Teej ko rahar aayo baree lai)” / “Najaau na malaai chhodee, mukha modi, dil todi, chyaante mayalu”	Manohari Singh	Co-singers- Prakash Shrestha, Udit Narayan Deepa Narayan Jha (Gahatraj) and Prasaad Shrestha
1991	Baharon Ke Manjil	Hindi	"Sabse Badi Dosti” / “ Meri Jaan Duaa Karna” / “Tera Naam Likh Diya” / “Tum Tana Na Tana” / “ O My Sweetheart”	Raamlaxman	
1992	Bol Radha Bol	Hindi	"Main Hoon Gaon Ki Gori" / "Tu Tu Tu Tu Tara"	Anand–Milind	
1992	Maa	Hindi	"Barsat Mein Jab Aega"	Anu Malik	
1992	Saatwan Aasman	Hindi	“Mama Mia Mama Mia” / Tum Tum Ho Ke Nahi	Raamlaxman	
1992	Dharam Yodha	Hindi	"Kal Raat Mujhse Tu" / "Chori Se Chupke Chupke"	Pappu Khan	
1992	Chamatkar	Hindi	"Jawani Deewani"	Anu Malik	
	Tilak	Hindi	"Paanch Rupaiya Doge To"	Anand–Milind	
1993	Pehchaan (1993 film)	Hindi	"Dheere Dheere Nazar Ladne De" / "Log Aate Hai"		
	Ravan Raaj: A True Story	Hindi	"Jaan Le Loongi"	Viju Shah	
1994	Anjaam	Hindi	"Chane Ke Khet Mein"	Anand–Milind	
1994	Raja Babu	Hindi	"A Aa Ee O O O Mera Dil Na Todo (Female)" / "Sarkai Lo Khatiya" / "Ui Amma Ui Amma Kya Karata Hai"	Anand–Milind	
1994	Gopi Kishan	Hindi	"Haye Hukku Haye Hukku Haaye Haaye" / "Mera Mehboob Aayega" / "Batti Na Bujha" /"Chatri Na Khol"	Anand–Milind	
1994	Betaaj Badshah	Hindi	"Choodiyan Bajaoongi" / "Ek Chadar Do Sonewale"	Anand–Milind	
1994	Cheetah	Hindi	"Chu Chu Chu" / "Kashmakash Badhi To"	Jatin–Lalit	
1994	Udhaar Ki Zindagi	Hindi	"Dadaji Ki Chhadi Hoon Main"	Anand–Milind	
1994	Laadla	Hindi	"Dhik Ta Na Na"	Anand–Milind	
1994	Teesra Kaun	Hindi	"Title Song", "Love In Rain"	Anand–Milind	
1994	Eena Meena Deeka	Hindi	"Eena Ko Mil Gayee Meena" / "Maine Kya Julam Kiya" / "Saiyan Ke Saath Madhaiya Mein" / "Tere Dwar Khada Hai Jogi" / "Towel Mein Baahar Jaaogi" / "Parody Song"	Anand–Milind	
1994	Aao Pyaar Karen	Hindi	"Oee Maa Ye Kya Ho Gaya"	Aadesh Shrivastava	
1994	Vijaypath	Hindi	"Ladke Aaj Ke Ladke"	Anu Malik	
	Suhaag (1994 film)	Hindi	"Lachak Lachak"	Anand–Milind	
	Anth	Hindi	"Aaja Sikha Doon"	Anand–Milind	
	Krantiveer	Hindi	"Chunri Udi Sajan" / "Love Rap"	Anand–Milind	
	Pehla Pehla Pyar	Hindi	"O Jaanu" / "Saawan Mahina" / "Saari Baatein Hoti Hain By Chance"		
	Jai Kishen	Hindi	"Looshe Wai Wai" / "Surat Hai Meri Bholi" / "Yeh Alam Yeh Mausam"	Anand–Milind	
	Elaan (1994 film)	Hindi	"Tu Ru Ru" / "Mera Dil Bola"	Shyam-Surendra	
1995	Coolie No. 1	Hindi	"Jeth Ki Dopahri Mein"	Anand–Milind	
1995	God and Gun	Hindi	"Ban Gayee Ban Gayee"	Anand–Milind	
1995	Vapsi Sajan Ki	Hindi	"Chadh Gaya Pyar Ka"	Anand–Milind	
1995	Veer	Hindi	"Dhoom Dhadaka"	Dilip Sen-Sameer Sen	
1995	Angrakshak	Hindi	"Dil Mera Udaas Hai" / "Suno Suno Pyar Hua" / "Padhna Likhna Chhodo"	Anand–Milind	
1995	Raghuveer	Hindi	"Dil Tera Deewana", "Love Interview"	Dilip Sen-Sameer Sen	
1995	Jawab	Hindi	"Ek Tak Ant Thak"	Anu Malik	
1995	Taaqat	Hindi	"Love Me Love Me" / "Hun Huna Re Hun Huna"	Anand–Milind	
1995	Bewafa Sanam	Hindi	"Ooyee Ooyee Meri Amma"	Nikhil-Vinay	
1995	Miya Biwi Aur Saali	Hindi	“Gaali Gaali Tera Husn Ki Charcha” / “Chal Gaya Apna Chakkar”	M.M.Kreem	
	Hum Dono (1995 film)	Hindi	"Pyaar Ki Gaadi"	Anand–Milind	
	Kismat (1995 film)	Hindi	"Teri Kismat Mein"	Anand–Milind	
	Janam Kundli	Hindi	"Agar Barsaat" / "Cham Cham Chandini" / "Dil Deewana"	Anand–Milind	
	Jai Vikraanta	Hindi	"Gore Gore Gaal"	Anand–Milind	
	Ab Insaf Hoga	Hindi	"Mere Jhumkon Ne"	Anand–Milind	
	Jallaad	Hindi	"Gudgudi"	Anand–Milind	
1996	Bhishma	Hindi	"Mere Sine Main Dil Mera Bole"	Dilip Sen-Sameer Sen	
1996	Loafer	Hindi	"Aao Chalo Hum Karein" / "Kuch Kuch Kuch Ho Raha Hai" / "Parody"	Anand–Milind	
1996	Himmat	Hindi	"Behake Behake Kadam Hai"	Anand–Milind	
1996	English Babu Desi Mem	Hindi	"Bharatpur Lut Gaya" / "Love Me Honey Honey"	Nikhil-Vinay	
1996	Mafia	Hindi	"Dil Mera Deewana Dhadke" / "Kis Ladki Ne Dil"	Anand–Milind	
1996	Saajan Chale Sasural	Hindi	"Doob Ke Dariya Mein"	Nadeem-Shravan	
1996	Apne Dam Par	Hindi	"Ek Ladki Phatakha"	Aadesh Shrivastava	
1996	Rangbaaz	Hindi	"Sawan Ki Raat Suhani" / "Sola Kiye The Pure"	Bappi Lahiri	
1996	Diljale	Hindi	"Shaam Hain Dhuan Dhuan"	Anu Malik	
1996	Masoom	Hindi	"Tukur Tukur Dekhate Ho Kya"	Anand Raj Anand	
1996	Muqadar	Hindi	"Chudiyan Bajau Ki Bajau Kangana"	Anand–Milind	
	Ek Tha Raja	Hindi	"Topi Topi"	Anand–Milind	
	Vijeta (1996 film)	Hindi	"Neend Aati Nahi"	Anand–Milind	
	Rakshak	Hindi	"Ooiyan" / "Parody Song"	Anand–Milind	
	Mr. Bechara	Hindi	"Na Di Dina"	Anand–Milind	
	Bandish (1996 film)	Hindi	"Aa Tujhe Main Pyaar Doon" / "Teetar Teeta" / "Zindagi Se Maut Ki Mulaqat Hai"	Anand–Milind	
	Naam Kya Hain (Unreleased)	Hindi	"Yun Toh Nazarbaaz" / "Jawan Jawan"	Anand–Milind	
1997	Judwaa	Hindi	"Tu Mere Dil Mein Bas Ja" / "Oonchi Hai Building" / "Tan Tana Tan Tan Tan Tara"	Anu Malik	
1997	Ishq	Hindi	"Mr. Lova Lova"	Anu Malik	
1997	Hero No. 1	Hindi	"Sona Kitna Sona Hai" / "Maine Paidal Se Ja Raha Tha"	Anand–Milind	Nominated – Zee Cine Award for Best Female Playback Singer for "Sona Kitna Sona Hai"
1997	Raja Ki Aayegi Baraat	Hindi	"Chanda Ki Chori"/ "Palkon Pe Sapne"	Aadesh Shrivastava	
1997	Mr. and Mrs. Khiladi	Hindi	"Mujhe Hero Ban Jaane De" / "Jumme Ke Jumme" / "Samosa Mein Aaloo"	Anu Malik	
1997	Shapath	Hindi	"Chum Le Mere Balon"	Anand–Milind	
1997	Daava	Hindi	"Dil Mein Hai Tu"	Jatin–Lalit	
1997	Zameer	Hindi	"Dekho To Palat Ke"	Anand–Milind	
1997	Deewana Mastana	Hindi	"Hungama Ho Gaya"	Laxmikant–Pyarelal	
1997	Mrityudata	Hindi	"Illa Loo Illa Loo" / "Tak Jhoom"	Anand–Milind	
1997	Bhai	Hindi	"Mujhe Ek Bar"	Anand–Milind	
1997	Insaaf	Hindi	"Taana Tandaana"	Anand–Milind	
1997	Suraj	Hindi	"Ek ladki naache raste mein" / "Kabootri Bole"	Anand–Milind	
	Banarasi Babu (1997 film)	Hindi	"Sasuri Garam Garam" / "San Sanan Sai"	Anand–Milind	
	Udaan (1997 film)	Hindi	"Angrezee Bhasha Mein"	Anand–Milind	
	Lahu Ke Do Rang (1997 film)	Hindi	"Gazab Seeti Maare"	Anand–Milind	
1998	Badmaash	Hindi	"Aashiq Aashiq"	Shyam-Surender	
1998	Kudrat	Hindi	"Ab Tak Hai Puri Azadi"	Rajesh Roshan	
1998	Sher-E-Hindustan	Hindi	"Chhuyi Muyi" / "Chikne Chikne Gaal" / "Wo Ja Rahi Hai" / "Mujhe Kambal Manga De"	Anand–Milind	
1998	Chandaal	Hindi	"Chod Chod N Kalaayi Sajna" / "Chod De Jaaneman"	Anand–Milind	
1998	Mard	Hindi	"Dil Dhadak Mera"	Dilip Sen-Sameer Sen	
1998	Hitler	Hindi	"Galon Se Khelun Main"	Dilip Sen-Sameer Sen	
1998	Vinashak	Hindi	"Godna God Mohe"	Viju Shah	
1998	Hatyara	Hindi	"Gore Gore Galo Wali"	Dilip Sen-Sameer Sen	
	Aunty No. 1	Hindi	"Chin China China"	Anand–Milind	
	Sar Utha Ke Jiyo	Hindi	"Darwaza Khula Tha"	Anand–Milind	
	Barood (1998 film)	Hindi	"Sana Sana" / "Mach Gaya Shor"	Anand–Milind	
1999	Biwi No.1	Hindi	"Biwi No 1"	Anu Malik	
1999	Haseena Maan Jaayegi	Hindi	"Panga Na Le Mere Naal"	Anu Malik	
1999	Gair	Hindi	"Aankhon Mein Mohabbat"	Anand–Milind	
1999	Maa Kasam	Hindi	"Angoorwali Bagiyan"	Anand–Milind	
1999	Sanyasi Mera Naam	Hindi	"Arrey Arrey"	Anand–Milind	
1999	Hote Hote Pyar Ho Gaya	Hindi	"Laddu Motichur Ka"	Anand Raj Anand	
	Rajaji (film)	Hindi	"Sasuji Taro Lalla"	Anand–Milind	
2000	Chal Mere Bhai	Hindi	"Aaj Kal Ki Ladkiyan"	Anand–Milind	
2000	Jwalamukhi	Hindi	"Chan Chana Chan" / "Shaadi Kar Le"	Anand–Milind	
2000	Agniputra	Hindi	"Choona Na Mera Ghungta"	Nikhil-Vinay	
2000	Shikari	Hindi	"Gora Pareshaan Hai"	Aadesh Shrivastava	
2000	Champion	Hindi	"Lelo Lelo"	Vishal–Shekhar	
2001	Prince No. 1	Hindi	"Ab Tu Meri"	Mani Sharma	
2001	Zahreela	Hindi	"Hai Ram Buddhe Me"	Anand–Milind	
2001	Ittefaq	Hindi	"Raaton Ko"	Dilip Sen-Sameer Sen	
2001	Kyo Kii... Main Jhuth Nahin Bolta	Hindi	"Suno Miya Suno"	Anand Raj Anand	
2002	Jaani Dushman: Ek Anokhi Kahani	Hindi	"Roop Salona Tera Dekh Ke"	Anand Raj Anand	
2002	Marshal	Hindi	“Mujhe Dekho Na Aise	Ghulam Ali	
2003	Mudda	Hindi	"Godanva"	Jeet-Pritam	
2003	Main Madhuri Dixit Banna Chahti Hoon	Hindi	"Phir Se Teri Makkhan Malai"	Amar Mohile	
2004	Inteqam: The Perfect Game	Hindi	"Jhanak Jhanak Jhan Payal Baje"	Anand–Milind	
2004	Police Force	Hindi	"Maina Kunwari"	Anand–Milind	
2004	Shart: The Challenge	Hindi	"Dil Tera Badmash" / "Yeh Chiquita Komastaas"	Anu Malik	
2004	Hulchul	Hindi	"Lut Gayee"	Vidyasagar	
	Ali Baba Aur 40 Chor	Hindi	"Jaadoo Ki Pudiya"	Anand–Milind	
2006	Mr 100%	Hindi	"Karta Hain Kabutar"	Vijay Kapoor	
2006	Ladies Tailor	Hindi	"Na Dikat Karo Na Disturb Karo" / "Parody" / "Maaf Karo"	Nishad Chandra	
2007	Sarhad Paar	Hindi	"Aadha Sach"	Anand Raj Anand	
2008	Dil Mile Na Mile	Hindi	"Yeh Dahekti Jawani"	Palash Chaudhari	
2009	Dushmani	Hindi	"Lehnge Se Lage Hawa"	Nikhil-Vinay	
2009	Sanam Teri Kasam	Hindi	"Ek Baar Ek Baar Pyaar Se"	Nadeem-Shravan	
2013	Khoka 420	Bengali	"Solid Case Kheyechhi"	Shree Pritam	
2015	Miss Butterfly	Bengali	"Legeche Agun"	Shree Pritam	

== Recognition ==
- 1973: Government of Maharashtra - Awarded for support to educational relief
- 1974: Filmfare Best Female Playback Award - Tera Mujhse Hai Pehle (Aa Gale Lag Jaa) - Nominated
- 1978: Filmfare Best Female Playback Award - Kya Huwa Tera Vada (Hum Kisise Kum Naheen) - Nominated
- 1998: Zee Cine Award - Best Playback Singer (Female) – Sona Kitna Sona Hain (Hero No. 1) - Nominated
- 2017: Mohammad Rafi Award - Presented by Vice-President of India
- 2020: Global Film and Music Festival - Lifetime Achievement Award

== Personal life ==
She has a son Nishadh Chandra, who is a music composer.
