= Tiku Talsania filmography =

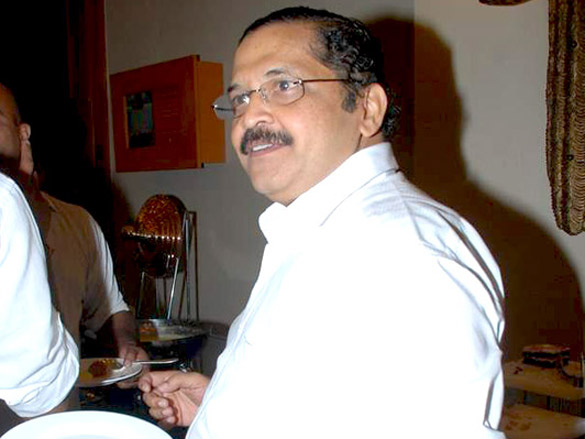
- Film: 197
- Television series: 11

This article presents the filmography of Tiku Talsania.

== Films ==
=== As actor ===
Film
Year	Title	Role	Notes
1986	Pyaar Ke Do Pal	Lakhan	
1986	Duty	Dharamdas	
1986	Asli Naqli	Tiku	
1987	Jawab Hum Denge		
1987	Pyar Ke Kabil		
1987	Sadak Chhap	Jaikishen	
1987	Kudrat Ka Kanoon	Court Spectator	
1987	Param Dharam		
1987	Insaf Ki Pukar	Municipal Inspector Narayan Singh	
1988	Zalzala	groom's dad	
1988	Mar Mitenge	Inspector Parab	
1988	Kanwarlal	Advocate Uttamlal	
1988	Kabzaa		
1989	Khuli Khidki		
1989	Hum Intezaar Karenge	wildlife professor	
1989	Hum Bhi Insaan Hain		
1989	Bade Ghar Ki Beti		
1989	Hisaab Khoon Ka	Satpal, Treasurer	
1990	Pyasi Nigahen		
1990	Azaad Desh Ke Gulam	MLA Nagendra Rao	
1990	Amiri Garibi		
1990	Teri Talash Mein		
1991	Parakrami		Unreleased Movie
1991	Hatyarin	Totaram	
1991	Inspector Dhanush		
1991	Dil Hai Ki Manta Nahin	newspaper editor	
1992	Umar 55 Ki Dil Bachpan Ka	Avinash Chatterjee	
1992	Jeena Marna Tere Sang	Professor Cheputkar	
1992	Daulat Ki Jung	Mr. Agarwal	
1992	Mera Dil Tere Liye	Phoolwa's husband	
1992	Zakhmi Sipahi	Priya's brother	
1992	Tyagi	Nand Lal Laundry Man	
1992	Paayal	Uncle	
1992	Ek Ladka Ek Ladki	Police inspector	
1992	Bol Radha Bol	Village Headman	
1993	Shreemaan Aashique	Kalidas Mehra	
1993	Phool	Santosh	
1993	Kabhi Haan Kabhi Naa	Patel	
1993	Jeevan Ki Shatranj		
1993	Game	Kamal	
1993	Waqt Hamara Hai	Tejas Raj Vidrohi	
1993	Hum Hain Rahi Pyar Ke	Advocate Homi Wadia	
1993	Shaktiman	Dhimagchand	
1993	Rang	Principal	
1993	Hum Hain Kamaal Ke		
1993	Tadipaar	Inspector Mathur	
1994	Eena Meena Deeka	Gabbar	
1994	Chhoti Bahoo		
1994	Aatish: Feel the Fire	Jarnail Singh	
1994	Baali Umar Ko Salaam		
1994	Prem Shakti	Dhanraj Moneylender	
1994	Andaz Apna Apna	Inspector Pandey	
1994	Pehla Pehla Pyar	Anand's boss	
1994	Vaade Iraade	Natwarlal Lal	
1994	Ikke Pe Ikka	Dr. Topiwala	
1994	Suhaag	Publisher	
1994	Aao Pyaar Karen	Driver, Tikuram	
1994	Zaalim		
1995	Raja Shantipati		
1995	Raghuveer		
1995	Oh Darling Yeh Hai India		
1995	Kismat	Seth Dhaniram	
1995	Jallaad	Police Inspector	
1995	Ahankaar	Naina's dad	
1995	Aashique Mastane	Achanak	
1995	Jawab (1995 film)	Inder Mohan Kumar	
1995	Naajayaz	A.C.P Malhotra	
1995	Ram Shastra		
1995	Hum Sab Chor Hain	Mantri	
1995	Veer		
1995	Sarhad: The Border of Crime	Hotel Owner	
1995	Hum Dono		
1995	Hulchul	Khupchand	
1995	Dance Party		
1995	Takkar	Mamaji	
1995	Coolie No. 1		
1995	Taqdeerwala	Marwadi Seth	
1996	Hum Hain Khalnayak		
1996	Dastak		
1996	Raja Hindustani		
1996	Mr. Bechara	Insp. V.P. Chaturvedi	
1996	Muqadama		
1996	Daraar		
1996	Khiladiyon Ka Khiladi		
1996	Loafer	Hotel Client/School Principal	
1996	Chaahat		
1996	Papa Kehte Hai		
1996	Megha	College Professor	
1996	Chhota Sa Ghar		
1996	Dil Tera Diwana		
1997	Salma Pe Dil Aa Gaya	Raashid	
1997	Gundagardi		
1997	Aflatoon	Police Inspector	
1997	Ishq	Bank Manager Gaitonde	
1997	Deewana Mastana		
1997	Dil Kitna Nadan Hai	Hariprasad Yadav aka Hariya	
1997	Tarazu		
1997	Ghoonghat	Sindhi Chakkiwala	
1997	Lav Kush	Prachodi	
1997	Mrityudata	Umeshchan Jain	
1997	Lahoo Ke Do Rang	Kalendra Swami	
1997	Auzaar		
1997	Hero No. 1	Vidya Nath	
1997	Ghulam-E-Mustafa	Qawwali singer	
1997	Gudia		
1997	Judwaa	Sharma's brother-in-law	
1997	Virasat	bali's Lawyer	
1998	Bade Miyan Chote Miyan	jeweller	
1998	Pyaar To Hona Hi Tha	Kumar Mangat/Sher Singh	
1998	Gharwali Baharwali	Ram Gopal	
1998	Duplicate	Insp. R.K.Thakur	
1998	Pyaar Kiya To Darna Kya	Principal	
1998	Ustadon Ke Ustad	detective/cook	
1998	Zor	Newspaper Editor	
1998	Jaane Jigar	Ganshyam's friend	
1998	Barsaat Ki Raat		
1998	Deewana Hoon Pagal Nahi		
1998	Mohabbat Aur Jung		
1998	Phool Bane Patthar	Police Constable Munnu	
1999	Dahek: A Burning Passion		
1999	Double Gadbad	Minister S.P. Sinha	
1999	Trishakti	Laxmiprasad	
1999	Hogi Pyaar Ki Jeet	truck driver	
1999	Silsila Hai Pyar Ka		
1999	Nyaydaata		
2000	Raju Chacha	B.B.C.	
2000	Tera Jadoo Chal Gayaa	Ramesh Dolani	
2000	Deewane		
2000	Tarkieb	Gangaram/Musafir Singh	
2000	Mela	Murari/Sarpanch	
2000	Glamour Girl		
2000	Sultaan	Chaturbuuj	
2001	Aamdani Atthanni Kharcha Rupaiya	B.K. Kakkad (landlord)	
2001	Ittefaq	A.C.P. Gaitonde	
2001	Yeh Raaste Hain Pyaar Ke		
2001	Mujhe Meri Biwi Se Bachaao	Malkani	
2001	Jodi No.1	Ranjit Singh	
2001	Dil Ne Phir Yaad Kiya		
2001	Hum Deewane Pyar Ke Doctor		
2002	Devdas	Dharamdas	
2002	Hum Hain Pyaar Mein		
2002	Rishtey		
2002	Maseeha	Pinky's dad	
2002	Deewangee	Ratan (Raj's uncle)	
2002	Dil Vil Pyar Vyar		
2002	Shakti: The Power	Nandini's uncle	
2002	Soch Lovely Shankar		
2002	Akhiyon Se Goli Maare	Mr. Oberoi	
2002	Kitne Door Kitne Paas	Babu Patel	
2002	Kranti		
2002	Tum Jiyo Hazaron Saal		
2003	Jodi Kya Banayi Wah Wah Ramji	Vishwanath	
2003	Ek Aur Ek Gyarah	Tiku	
2003	Raja Bhaiya		
2003	Chori Chori		
2003	Hungama	Popat Seth	
2003	Calcutta Mail		
2003	Dil Ka Rishta		
2003	Tujhe Meri Kasam		
2004	Rok Sako To Rok Lo	Sweety's husband	
2004	Kis Kis Ki Kismat	Nimesh Popley	
2004	Poochho Mere Dil Se		
2004	Ishq Hai Tumse	Raj Narala	
2004	Shola: Fire of Love		
2005	Home Delivery	Gungunani	
2005	Hum Tum Aur Mom: Mother Never Misguides		
2005	Sab Kuch Hai Kuch Bhi Nahin		
2005	Tango Charlie	Ram Narayan	
2006	Iqraar by Chance	radio station owner	
2006	Aap Ki Khatir	Praful Shah	
2006	We R Friends		
2006	Phir Hera Pheri	Inspector	
2006	Love in Japan	Tiku Seth	
2006	Jawani Diwani: A Youthful Joyride	Umesh Jumani	
2007	Dhol	Insp. Subhash Dogre	
2007	Dhamaal	Commissioner Chaturvedi	
2007	Partner	Naina's boss	
2008	Khallballi: Fun Unlimited		
2009	Aao Wish Karein	Tiku Malhotra	
2009	Shortkut	Tolani	
2010	Run Bhola Run		
2010	Be Careful	Mr. Kapoor	
2010	Bachao - Inside Bhoot Hai...		
2010	Muskurake Dekh Zara		
2010	Mastang Mama		
2013	Once Upon A Time In Mumbai Dobaara	Tayyab Ali	
2013	Special 26	Mangadas (jewellery shop owner)	
2015	Balkadu	School Principal	Marathi Movie
2015	Chal Guru Ho Jaa Shuru		
2015	Mere Genie Uncle	Genie	
2015	All is Well	Producer	
2017	Patel Ki Punjabi Shaadi	Kanti Bhai (Manisha's father-in-law)	
2021	Hungama 2	Cook Ojasram Nandan	
2022	Humble Politiciann Nograj	PM Sahab	Web Series on Voot
2022	Vaahlam Jaao Ne		Gujarati Film
2022	Cirkus	Veljibhai	
2023	Shastry Viruddh Shastry	Sunil Doshi	
2024	Vicky Vidya Ka Woh Wala Video	Tikaram Babla, Vicky's grandfather	
2025	Mere Husband Ki Biwi	Arun Mathur	
2025	Jai Mata Ji - Let's Rock		Gujarati Film
2025	Fari Ek Vaar	Rishikesh	Gujarati Film
2025	Tu Meri Main Tera Main Tera Tu Meri	Shashtriji	
2025	Misri		Gujarati Film

=== Dubbing artist ===
Film
Year	Title	Actor	Notes
1999	Prince No.1	Brahmanandam	
2005	Malamaal Weekly	Innocent	

== Television ==
Year	Series	Role	Notes
1984	Yeh Jo Hai Zindagi	Raghuwan Kailash Gupta	
1990	Yeh Duniyan Gazab Ki	Maharaja	
1991	Zamana Badal Gaya		
1995	Ek Se Badh Kar Ek	Brij Mohan	
2003–2004	Hukum Mere Aaka		
2004	Hum Sab Baraati	Chandu Mehta	
2009–2012	Sajan Re Jhoot Mat Bolo	Dhirubhai Jhaveri	
2012	Golmaal Hai Bhai Sab Golmaal Hai	Dhanwantrilal Dhyanchand Dholakia	
2014	Pritam Pyare Aur Woh	Tiku Kilawala	
2015	Zindagi Abhi Baaki Hai Mere Ghost	Peter D'costa	
2017–2018	Sajan Re Phir Jhoot Mat Bolo	Paramveer Chopra (PC)	
