= Zulm-O-Sitam =

- Directed by: K. C. Bokadia
- Written by: K. C. Bokadia
- Produced by: R. Shankar; M. S. Senthilkumar
- Starring: Dharmendra; Shatrughan Sinha; Jaya Prada; Arjun; Madhoo; Mukesh Khanna; Danny Denzongpa
- Cinematography: Peter Pereira
- Edited by: D. N. Malik; Shyam Mukherjee
- Music by: Aadesh Shrivastava
- Distributed by: B. M. B. Pictures
- Release date: 19 September 1998
- Running time: 130 minutes
- Country: India
- Language: Hindi

Zulm-O-Sitam is a 1998 Indian Hindi-language action film directed by K. C. Bokadia. The film stars Dharmendra, Shatrughan Sinha, Jaya Prada, Arjun, Madhoo, Mukesh Khanna and Danny Denzongpa in the lead roles. It marked Bokadia's third collaboration with Dharmendra after Kundan (1993) and Maidan-E-Jung (1995) and fifth with Jaya, who apart from Kundan and Maidan-E-Jung, had also starred in Aaj Ka Arjun (1990), Tyagi (1992) and Insaniyat Ke Devta (1993) which were directed by Bokadia.

== Story ==
Superintendent of Police Arun is a hardworking, honest and diligent police officer in Bombay. He has been assigned to lead the detail in charge of the state's Chief Minister's protection. Things do not go as planned, and the Chief Minister is killed. The police find evidence linking Arun with this killing, and have him arrested and imprisoned. Arun loudly claims he in innocent, but if he is innocent, who actually was involved in this killing?

== Cast ==
- Dharmendra as SP Arun
- Shatrughan Sinha as Advocate Vishwanath
- Jaya Prada as Aarti
- Arjun Sarja as Arjun
- Madhoo as Meena
- Prem Chopra as Dharamdas
- Shakti Kapoor as Imli Dada
- Mukesh Khanna as Inspector Liyaqat Khan
- Mukesh Rishi as Police Commissioner Ajit Singh
- Gulshan Grover as Tiger
- Danny Denzongpa as Sikandar
- Mahesh Anand as Banjara
- Vikas Anand as Journalist Dinanath
- Milind Gunaji as Inspector Sher Khan
- Kishore Bhanushali as Raju Guide
- Ram Mohan as Senior Police Officer Baburao
- Mac Mohan as Mac
- Yunus Parvez as Defending Lawyer Saxena
- Dina Pathak as Meena's Grandmother
- Shiva Rindani as Rana
- Aasif Sheikh as Eve Teaser
- Sudhir as Sikandar's Henchman
- Nizhagal Ravi
- Sanghavi as Special appearance in the song "Masti Masti Mere Man Mein"

== Music ==
1. "Aankh Lad Gayi" - Kumar Sanu, Poornima
2. "Dil Tujhe Main Dunga" - Udit Narayan, Sadhana Sargam
3. "Kabhi To Mohabbat Kabhi To Ladaai" - Shabbir Kumar, Vijeta Pandit
4. "Main Deewana Main Mastana" - Udit Narayan
5. "Masti Masti Mere Man Mein" - Sudesh Bhosle, Poornima

== Release ==
The film was dubbed into Tamil as Arjuna.
