= Gandhi & Co. =

- Film poster
- Directed by: Manish Saini
- Screenplay by: Manish Saini
- Story by: Manish Saini
- Produced by: Mahesh Danannavar
- Starring: Reyaan Shah; Hiranya Zinzuwadia; Darshan Jariwala; Jayesh More; Dhruma Mehta
- Cinematography: Swathy Deepak
- Edited by: Manish Saini
- Production company: MD Media Corp
- Release dates: 26 May 2022 (Zlín Film Festival); 27 October 2023 (India)
- Running time: 101 minutes
- Country: India
- Language: Gujarati

Gandhi & Co. is 2023 Gujarati-language children's film written and directed by Manish Saini. It is produced by Mahesh Danannavar and stars Reyaan Shah, Hiranya Zinzuwadia and Darshan Jariwala in lead roles.

== Cast ==
The principal cast include:

- Reyaan Shah as Mintu
- Hiranya Zinzuwadia as Mitra
- Darshan Jariwala as Bharatbhai
- Jayesh More as Parth, Mintu's father
- Dhruma Mehta as Mintu's Mother
- Dhyani Jani

== Production ==
The film is a second Gujarati film of Manish Saini. He had previously directed Dhh (2017) which had National Film Award for Best Feature Film in Gujarati at the 65th National Film Awards. It was produced by Mahesh Danannavar. The film production was completed in 2021.

== Release ==
The film will have theatrical release on 27 October 2023.

== Accolades ==
The film won the Golden Lotus Awards as the Best Children's Film at 69th National Film Awards. The lead actors had won the best child actor wards at the New York Indian Film Festival. It was also awarded the Best Film Award at the 62nd Zlín Film Festival. Jani and Zinzuwadia had won the Best Actors Award and Saini had won the Best Director Award at 2023 Smile International Film Festival for Children and Youth.
