= Tyagi (film) =

- Poster
- Directed by: K. C. Bokadia
- Screenplay by: Shanmuga Sundaram
- Story by: M. D. Sundar
- Based on: Deva by Vijay
- Produced by: K. C. Bokadia
- Starring: Rajinikanth; Jaya Prada
- Cinematography: Babu
- Edited by: Shyam Mukherjee
- Music by: Bappi Lahiri
- Production company: Devyank Arts
- Release date: 29 May 1992
- Country: India
- Language: Hindi

Tyagi is a 1992 Indian Hindi-language action drama film produced and directed by K. C. Bokadia, starring Rajinikanth, Jaya Prada in lead roles, with Prem Chopra, Gulshan Grover, Shakti Kapoor, Kader Khan, Bhagyashree and Himalaya Dassani in supporting roles. The film is a remake of 1989 Kannada film Deva which Rajinikanth had earlier remade in Tamil in 1991 as Dharma Durai.

== Plot ==
Tyagi is the story of a brother, who gave away almost his entire life for the well being of his siblings, but teaches them a lesson when he finds out the true nature of his brothers.

Shankar, the eldest son of Chaudhary Ganga Prasad Dayal, has always made sacrifices for his two siblings, Shakti and Prem. He financed them by mortgaging his valuables and property for their better education in the city, much to the chagrin of his father. When Shakti rapes Sujata and is arrested, Shankar negotiates with Sujata and gets her to withdraw the complaint and marry Shakti. After marriage, when Shakti, Prem and Sujata re-locate in Bombay, the two brothers get involved with smuggler and underworld Don, Dabla, they end up swindling him. When Dabla's partner seeks vengeance, Shakti kills him, Shankar accepts the blame and is sentenced to prison for life, leaving his father, wife Parvati and a newborn son to fend for themselves. He is let out after several years for good behavior, returns home to find that their house has been sold by Shakti; his father has died; Parvati and his son are missing. He does locate Parvati in Bombay, this is when he is told that his son was killed after being chased by Prem and run over by a vehicle. Angered and out of control, he decides to kill them both, but Sujata pleads with him. Now years later, Shankar must again be prepared to make more sacrifices, this time for Shakti's grown daughter Aarti, who has eloped with Amar, the son of a tailor, Nandlal as well as rescue Shakti and Prem from Dabla's wrath, a rescue that may well cost him his life.

== Cast ==
- Rajinikanth as Shankar Dayal
- Jaya Prada as Parvati Dayal
- Prem Chopra as Dabla
- Gulshan Grover as Prem Dayal
- Shakti Kapoor as Shakti Dayal
- Kader Khan as Chaudhary Ganga Prasad Dayal
- Sujata Mehta as Sujata Dayal
- Bhagyashree as Aarti Dayal
- Himalaya Dasani as Amar
- Tiku Talsania as Nandlal
- Viju Khote as Gabbar Singh
- Joginder as Jogi
- Vikas Anand as Kabaddi Announcer

== Music ==
It has seven songs composed by Bappi Lahiri.

Song	Singer
"Mujhko To Kuch Kuch"	Asha Bhosle, Kumar Sanu
"Tanha Dil Ghabrata Hai"	Sapna Mukherjee, Kumar Sanu
"Lautke Aaja Re O Aa"	Kavita Krishnamurthy, Kumar Sanu
"Tumhari Chudiyan"	Kavita Krishnamurthy, Shabbir Kumar
"Tension"	Bappi Lahiri
"Bhagwan Kis Kasoor Ki"-1	Mohammed Aziz
"Bhagwan Kis Kasoor Ki"-2	Mohammed Aziz
