= Main Tera Dushman =

1989 film directed by Vijay Reddy

- Directed by: Vijay Reddy
- Produced by: K. C. Bokadia
- Starring: Jackie Shroff; Jaya Prada
- Music by: Laxmikant–Pyarelal
- Release date: 3 February 1989
- Country: India
- Language: Hindi

Main Tera Dushman (transl. I am your nemesis) is a 1989 Indian action film directed by Vijay Reddy. The movie stars Jackie Shroff and Jaya Prada in lead roles, with Sridevi in Extended Cameo, Anupam Kher, Kiran Kumar, Tej Sapru and Kulbhushan Kharbanda in supporting roles. Sunny Deol and Rajesh Khanna are featured in special appearances.

== Plot ==
Honest and diligent Range Forest Officer Kishan Srivastav (Jackie Shroff) and his wife Jaya (Jaya Prada) come to the rural area of Ramgarh, and upset the criminal activities of Thakur Dayalu (Anupam Kher), a corrupt police inspector, Kiran Kumar (Kumar) and their cronies. These activities include the capture and killing of wildlife so that Dayalu can decorate his palatial home. As Kishan attempts to disrupt their criminal enterprise, he finds that Dayalu Singh has by-passed him and complained to his superiors, thereby getting him dismissed from employment and being framed and imprisoned for a murder. Dayalu has not only gotten away with murder, but had also killed Gopal (Sunny Deol) in the presence of his girlfriend and to-be bride, Jugni (Sridevi), making her lose her sanity. Dayalu frames Jugni's dad, Jwalaprasad (Kharbanda) for the murder of Gopal.

With Jaya all by herself, Dayalu turns his lustful eyes towards her, but just at the right moment, Ramu, a baby elephant comes to her rescue and fights with the Thakur. When Kishan is jailed for seven years, his wife Jaya faints in the court and falls sick. Her son and Ramu the elephant take care of her, doing a street play to earn money for her medicines. Kishan escapes from jail with the help of Ramu the elephant, who packs his favorite boots for him. Ramu helps the family flee from the clutches of Thakur and his crony policemen.

While the family is hiding in the jungle, the son starts feeling hungry. Ramu goes near a temple and starts blessing women, who give him money. With this money, he buys bread for the family. Inspector Kiran Kumar sees this and follows Ramu the elephant into the jungle. Kiran finds the family and prepares to shoot Kishan; however, Ramu snatches the gun from him using his trunk. Together Kishan and Ramu fight off the policemen. Ramu eventually kills Kiran by trampling him. Meanwhile, Jwalaprasad is released from jail, only to find out that Jugni has escaped from the asylum. Jwalaprasad finds her in front of a temple, with perfect makeup, where she refuses to recognize him. Jugni is still under the perception that she is going to get married. Jwalaprasad managed to corner Thakur's men and tries to fight them alone. The men throw him into a swamp, but Kishan comes at the right time to save him, and Ramu the elephant pulls Jwalaprasad out of the swamp. Thakur's chief goon into the swamp making Thakur very angry. His men manage to shoot the sole witness to Kishan's innocence. Kishan takes this man to the hospital and threatens a doctor in order to save the witness.

Thakur has an epiphany that he is going to die, and in order to protect himself, he goes back to abduct Jaya, and kills a villager in the process. Jugni is reminded of the tragedy she faced and faints. Jwalaprasad informs Kishan that his wife has been abducted and both of them go to fight Thakur in his palatial house. They are both captured. Jugni arrives there, calling Dayalu Thakur her father, who tells her that he himself is Jugni's fiancée. Jugni then dresses up, and starts dancing in an attempt to fool him. Jugni, revealing her fighting skills, manages to release all three captives. Amidst this fight she is shot. Thakur manages to escape the drama, but Kishan, Jugni and Ramu the elephant catch up with him. Jugni kills Thakur and avenges Gopal's death. Ramu the elephant also remembers that Thakur had killed his mom and tramples Thakur. Jugni eventually dies from her injuries. Ramu the elephant implores the audience to save animals.

== Cast ==
- Jackie Shroff as Kishan Srivastav
- Jaya Prada as Jaya (Kishan's wife)
- Kiran Kumar as Inspector Kiran Kumar
- Sridevi (Extended Cameo appearance) as Jugni – Gopal's girlfriend and fiancée
- Anupam Kher as Thakur Dayalu
- Tej Sapru as Kaalu – Dayalu's assistant
- Rakesh Bedi as Forest constable Chustiram
- Rajendra Nath as Forest constable Dukhiram
- Mac Mohan as Forest constable Dhaniram
- Kulbhushan Kharbanda (special appearance) as Jwalaprasad – Jugni's father
- Sunny Deol (special appearance) as Gopal – Jugni's boyfriend and fiancé
- Rajesh Khanna (special appearance) as Shankar – Truck driver
- Jagdeep (special appearance) as Truck cleaner

== Soundtrack ==
Lyricist: Indeevar

#	Title	Singer(s)
1	"Ye Tera Haathi"	Manhar Udhas, Kavita Krishnamurthy
2	"Ae Babu Hum Aaye"	Kavita Krishnamurthy
3	"Jugni Aayee Dhulhan Banke"	Kavita Krishnamurthy
4	"Jinhe Chahiye Daulat Rabba"	Shabbir Kumar, Anuradha Paudwal
5	"Saare Jahan Ke Samne"	Shabbir Kumar, Alka Yagnik
6	"Baje Mera Bichhua"	Udit Narayan, Anuradha Paudwal
