= Mara Pappa Superhero =

- Directed by: Darshan Ashwin Trivedi
- Written by: Raam Mori
- Produced by: Tejasvi Vidyut Buch; Milapsinh Jadeja; U.T. Rao
- Starring: Abhinay Banker; Shraddha Dangar; Revanta Sarabhai; Bhavya Sirohi; Bhushan Bhatt
- Cinematography: Tapan Vyas
- Edited by: Burzin Unwalla
- Music by: Nishith Mehta
- Production company: Saiffron Entertainment
- Release dates: 19 June 2021 (London Indian Film Festival); 19 January 2024 (India)
- Country: India
- Language: Gujarati

Mara Pappa Superhero is a 2021 Indian Gujarati-language film directed by Darshan Ashwin Trivedi. Written by Raam Mori, the film stars Abhinay Banker, Shraddha Dangar, Revanta Sarabhai and Bhushan Bhatt in lead roles. The film also stars Bhavya Sirohi, Bharat Thakkar, Priyanka Raja, and Janushi Oza in supporting role. The plot follows the relationship of daughter with her parents. Produced under Saiffron Entertainment, Mara Pappa Superhero is the second film of Trivedi after Mrugtrushna.

== Cast ==
The film's cast include:

- Abhinay Banker as Bhavlo
- Shraddha Dangar as Teju
- Revanta Sarabhai as Yash
- Bhavya Sirohi as Kanku
- Bhushan Bhatt as Jamburo
- Bharat Thakkar as Jeram Mama
- Priyanka Raja as Devika
- Janushi Oza as Kiara
- Rudraksh nisiddh panchal as rudra

== Plot ==
The film depicts the relationship of a daughter with her parents. Bhavya has played the role of Kanku who thinks that her father is a superhero.

== Production ==
Raam Mori wrote the original story in Marathi. He later wrote it in Gujarati for the film. It is a second film of Mori after Montu Ni Bittu (2019). The shooting begun on 15 February 2020. The film was shot in Ahmedabad.

== Release ==
The film premiered at London Indian Film Festival in June 2021. The film had theatrical release on 19 January 2024.
