= Jai Mata Ji - Let's Rock =

2025 Indian Gujarati drama film

- Official Poster
- Directed by: Manish Saini
- Written by: Manish Saini
- Produced by: Siddharth Vadodaria; Kajal Vadodaria; Ravindra Sanghvi; Manish Saini; Akash JH Shah
- Starring: Malhar Thakar; Neela Mulherkar; Tiku Talsania; Vandana Pathak; Vyoma Nandi; Shekhar Shukla; Aryan Prajapati; Utkarsh Mazumdar; Shilpa Thakar
- Cinematography: Swathy Deepak
- Edited by: Manish Saini; Niraj Voralia
- Music by: Night Song Records
- Production company: Amdavad Films
- Distributed by: Rupam Entertainment Pvt Ltd
- Release date: 9 May 2025
- Country: India
- Language: Gujarati

Jai Mata Ji - Let's Rock is a 2025 Indian Gujarati Comedy and family drama film directed, written and edited by Manish Saini. It Stars Malhar Thakar, Neela Mulherkar, Tiku Talsania, Vandana Pathak, Vyoma Nandi Shekhar Shukla, Aryan Prajapati and others. The film is produced by Siddharth Vadodaria, Kajal Vadodaria, Ravindra Sanghvi, Manish Saini, Akash JH Shah and was released nationwide on 9 May 2025.

== Plot ==
A government scheme turns the life of an 80-year-old lady upside down, presenting her with four outrageous choices: seek revenge on her sons and their wives; rekindle a long-lost love; embrace a swanky lifestyle; or go full thug life with all of the above. This Gujarati comedy is centered around a quirky family, featuring humor, emotion, and surprise.

== Cast ==
- Malhar Thakar
- Neela Mulherkar
- Tiku Talsania
- Vandana Pathak
- Vyoma Nandi
- Shekhar Shukla
- Aryan Prajapati
- Utkarsh Mazumdar
- Shilpa Thakar

== Soundtrack ==
Jai Mata Ji - Let's Rock

Studio album by Parth Parekh, Ajay Jayanthi
- Released: 28 April 2025
- Studio: Night Song Records
- Genre: Feature film soundtrack
- Length: 3:41
- Language: Gujarati
- Label: Night Song Records
External audio
- Jai Mata Ji - Let's Rock Full Album on JioSaavn

=== Tracklist ===
All lyrics are written by Bhargav Purohit, Dhanji; all music is composed by Parth Parekh, Ajay Jayanthi

No.	Title	Lyrics	Music	Singer(s)	Length
1.	"Samajh Ma Na Aave"	Bhargav Purohit	Parth Parekh	Jigardan Gadhavi	3:36
2.	"Dakho Dakho"	Dhanji, Bhargav Purohit	Ajay Jayanthi	Dhanji	2:05
Total length:					03:41

== Marketing and Releases ==
The film was officially announced on 8 February 2025, with its release date revealed through Social media platforms. The official poster was launched on 31 March 2025 in Ahmedabad at the Smt. Maniben Tribhovandas Matru Gruh(Old Age Home), in the presence of senior citizens. The poster was subsequently shared on social media on 1 April 2025. The trailer was officially launched on 20 April 2025 in Ahmedabad. The film is scheduled for a nationwide theatrical release on 9 May 2025.

== Reception ==
Ganesh Aaglave of Firstpost described Jai Mata Ji – Let's Rock as a heartwarming and entertaining slice-of-life dramedy. He praised director Manish Saini for crafting a humorous yet sensitive portrayal of old age without hurting sentiments. Aaglave highlighted the film’s engaging narrative, strong performances by Malhar Thakar and Tiku Talsania, and its unique blend of comedy and emotion. He noted that the film delivers an eye-opening message through its story of family dynamics and late-life romance, making it both thoughtful and enjoyable. Kanksha Vasavada of The Times of India rated the film 3.5 out of 5, praised the fresh and socially relevant concept, calling it a sensitive yet impactful film. She lauded Manish Saini’s nuanced direction and strong writing in collaboration with Niren Bhatt, noting the film’s balance of humor and emotional depth. Performances by Malhar Thakar, Tiku Talsania, Neela Mulherkar, and others were highlighted as standout, with Mulherkar’s portrayal of the sharp-witted grandmother earning special mention. While the second half was noted as slightly stretched, Vasavada commended the film’s engaging twists and emotional resonance, recommending it as a must-watch for those seeking meaningful and fresh storytelling. Archana Vashisht of Times Now Navbharat rated 3.5 out of 5, praising director Manish Saini for his skillful storytelling that keeps the audience engaged throughout. She highlighted the natural and convincing performances by the ensemble cast, including Malhar Thakar, Tiku Talsania, Neela Mulherkar, and others. Vashisht recommended the film as a must-watch for those who enjoy original, family-oriented stories with a perfect blend of comedy and emotion.

== See also ==
- List of Gujarati films of 2025
- List of Gujarati films
