= Insaniyat Ke Devta =

- Poster
- Directed by: K. C. Bokadia
- Written by: K. C. Bokadia; Faiz Saleem; Shanmugam Sundaram; Iqbal Durrani
- Produced by: I. A. Desai; Salim Khan
- Starring: Rajinikanth; Vinod Khanna; Raaj Kumar; Jaya Prada; Manisha Koirala
- Cinematography: Peter Pereira
- Edited by: Govind Dalwadi
- Music by: Anand–Milind
- Distributed by: D.S. Films
- Release date: 12 February 1993
- Country: India
- Language: Hindi

Insaniyat Ke Devta (transl. The god of humanity) is a 1993 Hindi-language action film directed by K. C. Bokadia. The film stars Rajinikanth, Raaj Kumar, Jaya Prada, Manisha Koirala and Vinod Khanna.

== Plot ==
Balbir and Anwar are close friends who are both honest and brave, and always willing to lend a helping hand to anyone who is in need, including the people behind an Ashram (rest house for the poor). They are in love with two lovely ladies Paro and Husna Bano. Balbir's younger brother Vivek is a student and has fallen in love with another lovely young lady Nisha. Nisha is the daughter of Ranjit, a rich tycoon who will do anything to take over the land and property of the Ashram, demolish it, and begin construction on it. He enlists the help of corrupt Jail Minister Veni Prasad Bhandari and Thakur Shakti Singh. When Balbir and Anwar frustrate his attempts, he has them thrown in jail and has the Ashram demolished by a bomb, placed by an escaped jail inmate. Balbir and Anwar escape from jail and avenge the demolition and death of the innocent, including Babaji by killing Ranjit in broad daylight, for which they are arrested and get a life sentence. The jail they are in is in charge of Jailer Rana Pratap, who is a strict disciplinarian, as well as honest and incorruptible. All three learn to respect each other. Meanwhile, Balbir's brother Vivek is framed for the murder of Nisha's mom Sumitradevi and he too gets a jail sentence. Balbir and Anwar's jail escapades are frustrated by Rana Pratap. Will justice be finally served? Who is behind the killing of Sumitradevi?

== Cast ==
- Rajinikanth as Anwar
- Raaj Kumar as Jailor Rana Pratap Singh
- Vinod Khanna as Balveer
- Jaya Prada as Paro
- Varsha Usgaonkar as Husn Banu
- Vivek Mushran as Vivek
- Manisha Koirala as Nisha
- Raza Murad as Minister Veni Prasad Bhandari
- Shakti Kapoor as Thakur Shakti Singh
- Rami Reddy as Jabbar Singh
- Yunus Parvez as Dharamdas
- Vikas Anand as Principal
- Ajit Vachani as Ranjeet
- Rita Bhaduri as Ranjeet's wife
- Rakesh Bedi as Dholakia
- Joginder as Tilakdhari
- Avtar Gill as Assistant Jailor Chaudhary
- Senthil as Muthuswamy
- Javed Hyder as Raju

== Soundtrack ==
#	Song	Singer
1.	"Suno To Zara"	Kumar Sanu, Sadhana Sargam
2.	"Mera Balma Thanedar"	Shabbir Kumar, Uttara Kelkar
3.	"Neend Nahi Aati"	Udit Narayan, Sadhana Sargam
4.	"Tan Bheeg Gaya"	Udit Narayan, Kavita Krishnamurthy
5.	"Shaadi Rachayenge"	Mohammed Aziz, Kavita Krishnamurthy & Anand Kumar
