= Deva (1989 film) =

- Promotional poster
- Directed by: Vijay
- Written by: M. D. Sundar
- Produced by: B. Nagi Reddy
- Starring: Vishnuvardhan; Rupini
- Cinematography: N. S. Raju
- Edited by: Mohan Brothers
- Music by: Upendra Kumar
- Production company: Sri Durga Art Productions
- Distributed by: Sri Durga Art Productions
- Release date: 7 August 1989
- Running time: 153 minutes
- Country: India
- Language: Kannada

Deva is a 1989 Indian Kannada-language romantic action film, starring Vishnuvardhan and Rupini. The film was directed by Vijay and written by M. D. Sundar.

In the film, Vishnuvardhan played the role of Deva who seeks revenge from his younger brothers when they attempt to disrupt his peace after destroying his family in the past by taking advantage of his innocence.

This film was remade in Telugu as Maa Inti Katha (1990) starring Mohan Babu, in Tamil as Dharma Durai (1991), and in Hindi as Tyagi (1992), with the latter two versions starring Rajinikanth.

== Cast ==
- Vishnuvardhan as Devaraj (Deva)
- Rupini as Gowri
- Devaraj as Mohanraj
- Tara as Sujatha
- Vijayakashi as Ramraj
- Jyothi as Radhika
- Rajanand as Deva's father
- Vajramuni as Laalvaani
- Sundar Krishna Urs as Professor
- Sudheer as Chaaku Chinobi
- Avinash as Prakash
- Bank Janardhan as Baddi Basayya
- Mysore Lokesh as Maaranahalli Naaranappa
- Dinesh as Naataka Raghanna, Gowri's father
- Lohithaswa as Sujatha's father
- Nagesh Yadav as Ravi

== Soundtrack ==
Soundtrack album by Upendra Kumar
- Released: 1989
- Recorded: 1989
- Genre: Feature film soundtrack
- Length: 24:20
- Label: Sangeetha

Singles from Deva
- 1. "Koragi Koragi"; 2. "Suggi Bandu"

All the songs were composed and scored by Upendra Kumar.

S. No.	Song title	Singer(s)	Lyrics
1	"Koragi Koragi"	S. Janaki	Doddarangegowda
2	"Devanna Nina Mele"	S. P. Balasubrahmanyam, S. Janaki	M. N. Vyasa Rao
3	"Hendthi Beke"	S. P. Balasubrahmanyam (and Chorus)	Chi. Udaya Shankar
4	"Suggi Banda"	S. P. Balasubrahmanyam	Shyamasundara Kulkarni
5	"Thyagake Endendu"	S. P. Balasubrahmanyam (and Chorus)	Geethapriya

== Release ==
The film received an extremely good reception at the box office. The positive word of mouth helped in the movie's successful theatrical run. The movie ran for 25 weeks. The movie has become a cult film among Vishnuvardhan's fans. The movie is often considered to be one of the best action films in his career.

=== Home media ===
The movie was made available as VOD on Amazon Prime Video. The VCDs and DVDs of the film were released by Sri Ganesh Video.
