= Lakiro =

2023 Indian Gujarati film

- Official poster
- Directed by: Darshan Ashwin Trivedi
- Screenplay by: Darshan Ashwin Trivedi
- Story by: Darshan Ashwin Trivedi
- Produced by: Sneh Shah; Pranav Joshi; Darshan Ashwin Trivedi; Suryaveer Singh Bhullar
- Starring: Deeksha Joshi; Raunaq Kamdar; Netri Trivedi
- Cinematography: Tapan Vyas
- Edited by: Nirav Panchal
- Music by: Parth Bharat Thakkar
- Release date: 6 January 2023
- Running time: 146 minutes
- Country: India
- Language: Gujarati

Lakiro (Gujarati: લકીરો), is a 2023 Gujarati film directed by Darshan Ashwin Trivedi, starring Deeksha Joshi, Raunaq Kamdar, Netri Trivedi, Shivani Joshi and Vishal Shah.

== Synopsis ==
Richa and Hrishi, both millennials, cross paths while studying in Pune. Richa is doing her Ph.D. in HR Management, while Hrishi is doing his MBA in finance. It was love at first sight for both of them, culminating in marriage as soon as they were done studying. Hrishi was the typical ambitious male and landed a job as an investment banker. His ambition drives him away from Richa, making her feel lonely and depressed. Richa feels compelled to take up a job, pursue her career, and join a startup as an HR consultant. Hrishi is unhappy as he feels she should be a homemaker and wants a baby. Like most working couples today, their careers slowly start to create a divide. Things turn so ugly that they eventually decide to file for divorce. Coincidentally their divorce happens on Richa's birthday, and circumstances compel Hrishi to attend Richa's birthday party the same night. Strange is the human heart, and destiny is never in our hands. At the party, something unusual happens between Hrishi and Richa.

== Cast ==
- Deeksha Joshi as Richa
- Raunaq Kamdar as Hrishi
- Netri Trivedi as Saumya
- Nisarg Trivedi as Hrishi's father
- Shivani Joshi as Kavya
- Vishal Shah as Nikhil
- Dharmesh Vyas as Mr. Mehta
- Diana Rawal as Richa's mother
- Hitesh Thakar as Shankarbhai
- Makrand Shukla as Dr. Shrivastava
- Deepak Antani as Judge

== Production ==
The shooting of the film started in November 2021. The film was filmed in Ahmedabad, with other locations including Bangalore, Pune, and Mumbai. Initially, Lakiro was scheduled for theatrical release on 25 November 2022, but it was postponed, and eventually released on theaters on 6 January 2023.

== Soundtrack ==
Lakiro

Soundtrack album by Parth Bharat Thakkar
- Released: 22 November 2022
- Genre: Feature film soundtrack
- Label: Warner Music India

The music for Lakiro is composed by Parth Bharat Thakkar. The songs of the film have been sung by Amit Trivedi, Vishal Dadlani, Shilpa Rao, Shalmali Kholgade, Benny Dayal, Shruti Pathak, and Thakkar. The soundtrack will be released in Gujrati and Hindi languages. The Gujarati lyrics are written by Chirag Tripathi and Tushar Shukla while Hindi lyrics are written by Amitabh Verma. The album will be released by Warner Music India.

Track list
No.	Title	Lyrics	Music	Singer(s)	Length
1.	"Lakiro"	Chirag Tripathi	Parth Bharat Thakkar	Amit Trivedi	4:03
2.	"Tu Nathi Ke Tu Chhe"			Vishal Dadlani, Shilpa Rao, Parth Bharat

== Reception ==
Shruti Jambhekar of The Times of India rated 3 stars out of 5. She praised its attempt to address modern marital issues; however, she criticized the film's duration and noted that it might be more suitable for OTT platforms.

== Accolades ==
The film received 8 nominations at the 21st Transmedia Gujarati Awards.
