= Mijaaj =

- Directed by: Tapan Vyas
- Written by: Pravin Pandya
- Produced by: Jitendra Pandya
- Starring: Malhar Thakar; Esha Kansara; Revanta Sarabhai; Abhinay Banker; Chhaya Vora; Jayesh More; Kajal Pisal
- Cinematography: Tapan Vyas
- Edited by: Nirav Panchal
- Music by: Meghdhanush
- Production company: Bhavik Patel Productions
- Release date: 5 January 2018
- Running time: 122 minutes
- Country: India
- Language: Gujarati

Mijaaj is a 2018 Indian Gujarati action drama film directed by Tapan Vyas, written by Pravin Pandya and produced by Jitendra Pandya. It stars Malhar Thakar, Esha Kansara, Revanta Sarabhai, Abhinay Banker, Chhaya Vora, Jayesh More, Bhatt Bhushan, Andy von Eich & Kajal Pisal.

== Cast ==
- Malhar Thakar as Jay
- Esha Kansara as Jahnvi
- Revanta Sarabhai as Yogesh
- Abhinay Banker as VP
- Chhaya Vora as Sarita Ben
- Jayesh More
- Bhatt Bhushan
- Andy von Eich
- Kajal Pisal

== Soundtrack ==
Meghdhanush composed the music and lyrics were written by Priya Saraiya under the label of Krup Music.

Track list
No.	Title	Singer(s)	Length
1.	"Bhinjaaun"	Jonita Gandhi	3:39

== Release ==
It released on 5 January 2018 in various cities in Gujarat, as well as Mumbai.
