= Kudrat Ka Kanoon =

Indian Hindi-language legal drama film

- Poster
- Directed by: S. A. Chandrasekhar
- Written by: Shabd Kumar (dialogues)
- Story by: Shoba Chandrasekhar
- Based on: Neethikku Thandanai (Tamil) by S. A. Chandrasekhar
- Produced by: Suresh Bokadia; K. C. Bokadia (presenter)
- Starring: Hema Malini; Radhika; Jackie Shroff
- Cinematography: Indu Chakravarthy
- Edited by: Shyam Mukherjee
- Music by: Laxmikant–Pyarelal
- Production company: BMB Combines
- Release date: 23 October 1987
- Country: India
- Language: Hindi

Kudrat Ka Kanoon (transl. Law of nature) is a 1987 Indian Hindi-language legal drama film directed by S. A. Chandrasekhar. The film stars Hema Malini, Radhika and Jackie Shroff. It is a remake of Chandrasekhar's Tamil film Neethikku Thandanai (1987) and was a box office success.

== Plot ==
Dr. Vijay Verma saves a labourer from some henchman but finds himself framed in a murder case and is arrested. To make matters worse, his daughter is murdered and his wife is forced to abscond from the village. Advocate Bharti Mathur comes to Vijay’s rescue, vowing to find him and his family justice.

== Cast ==
- Hema Malini as Advocate Bharti Mathur
- Radhika as Aarti Verma / Miss Julie Singh
- Charan Raj as MP Charandas
- Pran as Raj Shekhar
- Jackie Shroff as Dr. Vijay Verma
- Kiran Kumar as Inspector Gorakh Pandey
- Om Shivpuri as Sarpanch Dharamraj
- Asrani as Khairatlal
- Shafi Inamdar as Chunnilal, Bharathi's Husband
- Satyen Kappu as Justice Ram Mathur
- Raza Murad as Advocate Pravin Bhardwaj
- Ramesh Deo as Advocate Prakash
- C. S. Dubey as Ramu
- Tiku Talsania as Court spectalor Narayan
- Raj Babu as Srivastav
- Surendar as Sinha
- Madhukar as Maqbool
- Ram Kumar as Niranjan
- Beena Banerjee as Asha, Charandas' wife
- Kutty Padmini as Nirupa
- Baby Guddu as Munni Verma

== Themes and influences ==
According to psychologist Dona Singh, films such as Khamoshi (1969) and Kudrat Ka Kanoon reinforced stereotypes of mental health instead of promoting understanding.

== Soundtrack ==
All music is composed by Laxmikant–Pyarelal.

Track listing
No.	Title	Lyrics	Singer(s)	Length
1.	"Tujhe Kitna Pyar Karen" (Sad Version)	Sameer	Lata Mangeshkar	2:06
2.	"Tujhe Kitna Pyar Karen"	Sameer	Lata Mangeshkar, Shabbir Kumar	5:29
3.	"Mukhda Chand Ka Tukda"	Faruk Kaiser	Alka Yagnik	6:14
4.	"Kaisa Kudrat Ka Kanoon"	Sameer	Mohammed Aziz	6:00
5.	"Kaisa Kudrat Ka Kanoon" (Reprise)	Sameer	Mohammed Aziz	3:21
6.	"Abhi To Parhi Hai Umar Yeh Sari"	Sameer	Anuradha Paudwal	6:04
Total length:				29:14
