= Manish Saini =

Indian filmmaker

- Born: Haryana
- Education: National Institute of Design, Ahmedabad
- Occupation: Filmmaker
- Notable work: Dhh

Manish Saini is an Indian filmmaker who works in Gujarati language films. He is known for his work as a director in his debut, Dhh (2017), for which it received the National Film Award for Best Feature Film in Gujarati at the 65th National Film Awards. The film is a story of three school children who come to believe that a magician, who just came to city, can magically get them out of their troubles. The film that starred Naseeruddin Shah was released by Viacom18 and was also a part of the Toronto International Film Festival Kids.

== Career ==
Manish is born in Haryana but studied in Ahmedabad, Gujarat. He went to National Institute of Design, Ahmedabad. After Manish completed his study he started working on a script and went around convincing producers to fund his project. After facing a lot of rejections, he decided to produce his own directed film, Dhh by borrowing money from his relatives and friends. In 2018, the film got a National Award for the Best Gujarati Film. His second film, Gandhi & Co, won the Best Children Film at International Gujarati Film Festival (IGFF) 2022 and selected to screen in the Czech Republic.

== Filmography ==
Year	Film	Director	Writer	Producer	Note(s)	Ref(s)
2017	Dhh	Yes	Yes	Yes	Won the National Film Award for Best Feature Film in Gujarati	
2022	Gandhi & Co.	Yes	Yes	No	Won the Best Children Film at International Gujarati Film Festival (IGFF) 2022	
2023	Shubh Yatra	Yes	Yes	No		
2025	Jai Mata Ji - Let's Rock	Yes	Yes	Yes		
2026	The Great Grand Superhero	Yes	Yes	Yes		
