= Shubh Yatra =

2023 Indian film

- Official Poster
- Directed by: Manish Saini
- Screenplay by: Manish Saini
- Story by: T. Arul Chezhian
- Produced by: Nayanthara; Vignesh Shivan; Manish Saini
- Starring: Malhar Thakar; Monal Gajjar; Darshan Jariwala; Hemin Trivedi
- Cinematography: Swathy Deepak
- Edited by: Manish Saini
- Music by: Kedar and Bhargav
- Production companies: Amdavad Films; Satyam Movies; Rowdy Pictures
- Distributed by: Rupam Entertainment Pvt. Ltd.
- Release date: 28 April 2023
- Running time: 132 minutes
- Country: India
- Language: Gujarati

Shubh Yatra (transl. Happy journey) is a 2023 Indian Gujarati-language comedy drama film written and directed by Manish Saini. It stars Malhar Thakar, Monal Gajjar, Darshan Jariwala, and Hemin Trivedi in the lead roles. Thee film was distributed by Rupam Entertainment Pvt. Ltd. It is a remake of the 2016 Tamil film Aandavan Kattalai.

== Plot ==
Faced with several debts, a accountant Mohan leaves his village to head to Ahmedabad with his best friend Hardik to get all the documents necessary for going to the United States, where they plan to make money to pay off their debts. They approach a middleman to help them get the passport and tourist visa necessary for them to go to the United States. The middleman claim that the American consulate would prefer to give tourist visas to those who are already married, so the duo is forced to add their "wife's" name while applying for the passport, with Mohan adding his "wife's" name as Saraswativeena Devi. However, Mohan's visa application is rejected, forcing him to remain in Ahmedabad and take up a job as an accountant with a drama troupe, run by Master, while Hardik passes his visa interview and leaves for the United States with the help of a passport officer.

With his hard work and sincerity, Mohan soon becomes the favourite employee of Master. Eventually, the drama troupe are invited to perform in the United States, leaving Mohan in a bind as he now needs to get his "wife's" name removed from his passport. He finds out that the only way to do so is to divorce his "wife", but for that, he needs to find a woman who has the name Saraswativeena Devi. He successfully manages to track down a woman with the name, who is a television journalist and tries to convince her to act as his wife and "divorce" him. He also feigns muteness. Initially, she refuses, but she soon gives Mohan the necessary documents to "divorce" her, pitying him. However, since both husband and wife need to be present in the court at the time of divorce, Mohan convinces Suhani, an actress who works in the drama troupe, to act as Saraswati at the court. But at the time of the divorce hearing, Suhani disappears to the toilet, forcing a reluctant Saraswati, who is present at the court, to take part in the divorce hearing. The subsequent events at the divorce hearing prove humiliating for Saraswati, also she learns that Mohan's muteness is feigned. Hence she leaves the court in tears with no "divorce" granted.

Later, Mohan finds out that Hardik was deported upon arrival in the United States by immigration officials for trying to enter through Panama illegally. Mohan goes to the Regional Passport Office in Ahmedabad and admits his crime to the Regional Passport Officer. The passport officer asks him to pay a fine of ₹1,200 to get Saraswati's name removed from his passport. But when he's about to apply for the removal, Saraswati invites him to her house and they decide to get actually married instead. Mohan obtains the visa for the United States legally as the manager of the drama troupe.

== Cast ==
- Malhar Thakar as Mohan
- Monal Gajjar as Saraswati
- Darshan Jariwala as Master
- Hemin Trivedi as Hardik
- Hitu Kanodia as Regional Passport Officer
- Jhanvi Gurnani as Suhani
- Sunil Vishrani as Lawyer
- Jay Bhatt as Investigation Officer

== Production ==
The film was a remake of the 2016 Tamil film Aandavan Kattalai. Nayanthara and Vignesh Shivan produced their first-ever Gujarati film under the banner of Rowdy Pictures.

== Soundtrack ==
Shubh Yatra

Soundtrack album by Kedar and Bhargav
- Released: 21 April 2023
- Genre: Feature film soundtrack
- Length: 12:30
- Language: Gujarati
- Label: Shemaroo Entertainment Limited

All lyrics are written by Bhargav Purohit; all music is composed by Kedar and Bhargav.

Track listing
No.	Title	Singer(s)	Length
1.	"Sachvine Jaajo"	Aditya Gadhvi	2:51
2.	"Baby Booch Mari Gayi"	Sani Shah	3:08
3.	"Tu Mane Yaad"	Mohan Kannan	4:12
4.	"Dollariya Raja"	Geetaben Rabari	2:19
Total length:			12:30

== Marketing and release ==
The motion poster of the film was released on 27 March 2023. The film was released on 28 April 2023 in Gujarat.

== Reception ==
Deepali Chhatwani from The Times of India rated it 3 stars out of 5. She praised performances, direction and story. Nandini Oza of The Week rated it 4 out of 5 and also praised the theme and performances.

== Accolades ==
The film received 9 nominations at the 21st Transmedia Gujarati Awards.

== See also ==
- List of Gujarati films of 2023
