= K. C. Bokadia =

Indian film director

- Occupations: Director, producer
- Years active: 1972–present

Kistur Chand Bokadia, known by his stage name K.C. Bokadia, is an Indian film producer and director.

== Early life and career ==
Bokadia was born in Merta City, Nagaur, Rajasthan, India. He has produced Pyar Jhukta Nahin, Teri Meherbaniyan, Naseeb Apna Apna, Hum Tumhare Hain Sanam, Pyaar Zindagi Hai and Main Tera Dushman. He has directed Phool Bane Angaaray, Police Aur Mujrim, Insaaniyat Ke Devta, Aaj Ka Arjun, Kudrat Ka Kanoon. He co-produced Paap Ka Ant.

The Deccan Chronicle called him "the fastest producer to make 50 films". He made unconventional films such as 'Teri Meherbaniya' in which the main protagonist was a dog. He has also made films based on animals Main Tera Dushman and Kundan. As of June 2021, he made 60+ films spanning various Indian languages.

He made his debut as producer with the film Rivaaj in 1972. His debut as a director was Aaj Ka Arjun (1990) starring Amitabh Bachchan.

== Filmography ==
Year	Title	Director	Producer	Notes
1972	Rivaaj		Yes	
1985	Pyar Jhukta Nahin		Yes	
1985	Teri Meherbaniyan		Yes	
1986	Naseeb Apna Apna		Yes	
1987	Jawab Hum Denge		Yes	
1987	Kudrat Ka Kanoon		Presenter	
1988	Kab Tak Chup Rahungi		Yes	
1988	Ganga Tere Desh Mein		Yes	
1989	Main Tera Dushman		Yes	
1990	Aaj Ka Arjun	Yes	Yes	
1991	Phool Bane Angaarey	Yes	Yes	
1992	Police Aur Mujrim	Yes	Yes	
1992	Mere Sajana Saath Nibhana		Yes	
1992	Tyagi	Yes		
1993	Tahqiqaat		Yes	
1993	Kundan	Yes		
1993	Insaniyat Ke Devta	Yes		
1993	Shaktiman	Yes		
1993	Dil Hai Betaab	Yes		
1994	Aao Pyaar Karen		Yes	
1994	Janta Ki Adalat		Yes	
1994	Mohabbat Ki Arzoo	Yes		
1995	Zakhmi Sipahi		Yes	
1995	Maidan-E-Jung	Yes		
1996	Muqadama	Yes	Yes	
1998	Hitler		Yes	
1998	Zulm-O-Sitam	Yes		
1999	Lal Baadshah	Yes	Yes	
2000	Sultaan		Presenter	
2001	Pyaar Zindagi Hai		Yes	
2002	Hum Tumhare Hain Sanam		Yes	
2006	Bold	Yes		
2010	Khuda Kasam	Yes	Presenter	
2013	Deewana Main Deewana	Yes		
2015	Dirty Politics	Yes	Yes	
2019	Rocky: The Revenge	Yes		
2026	Teesri Begum	Yes	Yes	
