= Teri Meherbaniyan =

1985 film

- Teri Meherbaniyan poster
- Directed by: Vijay Reddy
- Written by: Jagdish Kanwal; Rajesh Vakil (Dialogue)
- Screenplay by: S. Sundaram
- Based on: Thaliya Bhagya (Kannada)
- Produced by: K.C. Bokadia
- Starring: Brownie (the dog); Amrish Puri; Jackie Shroff; Poonam Dhillon; Raj Kiran; Sadashiv Amrapurkar; Asrani; Swapna
- Cinematography: R. Chittibabu
- Edited by: Subhash Sehgal
- Music by: Laxmikant–Pyarelal
- Release date: October 18, 1985
- Running time: 140 minutes
- Country: India
- Language: Hindi
- Box office: ₹ 4 cr

Teri Meherbaniyan is a 1985 Indian Hindi film directed by Vijay Reddy and produced by K.C. Bokadia. Dog Brownie played a pivotal role while Jackie Shroff and Poonam Dhillon played the lead roles. The movie is a remake of director's own 1984 Kannada film Thaliya Bhagya starring Shankar Nag which had also been remade in Telugu as Nammina Bantu, in Malayalam as Ithente Neethi and in Tamil as Nandri.

== Plot ==
Ram (Jackie Shroff) is an honest young man, who accidentally hits a stray puppy with his motorbike. He takes it to the vet, then raises it as his own while it grows into an adult dog. One day, Ram and his dog Moti come to the village of the powerful and corrupt Thakur Vijay Singh (Amrish Puri). On the way, his vehicle breaks down and he meets with beautiful Bijli (Poonam Dhillon), and both fall in love with each other subsequently. Thakur Vijay Singh's men, especially Munim Banwarilal (Asrani) and Sardarilal (Sadashiv Amrapurkar), have taken over the village and exploited the poor people. However, Ram soon becomes a voice for the villagers, helping them get their just rewards which Thakur denies them. Meanwhile, Thakur has his eyes on Bijli; he also has 2 slaves: a widow named Sharda Devi (Swapna) and Gopi (Raj Kiran), a man who is mute. Sardarilal and Banwarilal clash with Ram, but retreat to their boss when beaten. Ram helps Gopi and Sharda, assisting them and encouraging them to marry.

One day, Ram returns to the city for some business. Before leaving, he asks Moti to guard Bijli. But Bijli tires of the dog's constant attention and locks him up. Thakur Vijay Singh, along with Sardarilal and Banwarilal, comes and tries to rape Bijli. Finding herself cornered, rather than let him touch her, she stabs herself, leaving her father (Satyen Kappu) distraught and close to insanity. An enraged and heartbroken Ram whips Moti for failing to guard Bijli, but Sharda and Gopi restrain him, telling him that Bijli herself locked the dog up. Eventually Ram himself is gruesomely strangled and stabbed to death by the three villains. Thakur then frames Gopi for the murder, who is arrested by the police and jailed.

With Bijli dead, Thakur Vijay Singh now turns his immoral attentions on Sharda and kidnaps her. Thakur Vijay Singh, Sardarilal and Banwarilal celebrate, now that their chief opponent and tormentor is out of the way.

However, Moti who had witnessed his master's brutal murder, and his girlfriend’s gruesome death, recollects every incident that precedes his master's killing and bites and barks his way into inflicting terror into the hearts and minds of his master's killers. The dog eventually kills off every one of them - first Sardarilal, then Banwarilal, and finally Thakur Vijay Singh, in a hurricane mission to avenge Ram's murder. He is aided by Gopi (who has escaped from the police) and with him he rescues Sharda from Thakur's clutches. The name of the movie comes from scenes of Moti lying near his master's grave yearning to be with him again interspersed with the title song "Teri Meherbaniyan", sung by Jackie to the dog in flashback. Moti also displays a sharp mind with him eventually leading the cops to the evidence of Ram's gruesome murder caught on tape by Ram's camcorder. Gopi and Sharda, now take care of Moti.

== Cast ==
- Jackie Shroff as Ram
- Poonam Dhillon as Bijli
- Raj Kiran as Gopi
- Swapna as Sharda
- Brownie (the dog) as Moti
- Asrani as Munim Banwarilal
- Sadashiv Amrapurkar as Sardarilal
- Amrish Puri as Thakur Vijay Singh
- Satyen Kappu as Bijli's Father
- Vikas Anand as Villager
- Vijay Tiwari as Singer

== Crew ==
- Director : B. Vijay Reddy
- Producer : K. C. Bokadia
- Screenplay : S. Sundaram
- Dialogue : Jagdish Kanwal, Rajesh Vakil
- Editor : Satish, Subhash Sehgal

== Soundtrack ==
All lyrics are written by S. H. Bihari; all music is composed by Laxmikant–Pyarelal.

Songs
No.	Title	Playback	Length
1.	"Aag Lage Tanman Mein"	Asha Bhosle
2.	"Aai Jawani Mori Chunariya"	Kavita Krishnamurthy
3.	"Aanchal Udaya Maine"	Shabbir Kumar, Kavita Krishnamurthy
4.	"Dil Bekraar Tha Dil Bekraar Hai"	Shabbir Kumar, Anuradha Paudwal
5.	"Teri Meherbaniyan"	Shabbir Kumar
