= Vaahlam Jaao Ne =

2022 Indian Gujarati Film

- Official Poster
- Directed by: Hardik Gajjar
- Written by: Rahul Patel
- Produced by: Jyoti Deshpande; Gajjar Parth; Hardik Gajjar
- Starring: Pratik Gandhi; Deeksha Joshi; Sanjay Goradia; Tiku Talsania; Ojas Rawal; Jayesh More; Kinjal Pandya; Binda Rawal; Kavin Dave; Pratap Sachdev
- Cinematography: Hrishikesh Gandhi
- Edited by: Kanu Prajapati
- Music by: Sachin–Jigar
- Production companies: Backbencher Pictures; Hardik Gajjar Films; Jio Studios
- Release date: 4 November 2022
- Country: India
- Language: Gujarati

Vaahlam Jaao Ne(Gujarati: વ્હાલમ જાઓ ને) is a 2022 Gujarati Comedy Drama film directed by Hardik Gajjar and Written by Rahul Patel. It stars Pratik Gandhi, Deeksha Joshi, Sanjay Goradia, Ojas Rawal, Tiku Talsania and Jayesh More.

== Plot ==
Reena is in love with Sumit. However due to her eccentric nature, Sumit has reservations about marrying her. But when Reena proposes the idea of meeting her father, Sumit is unable to say no, leading to a comedy of errors.

== Cast ==
- Pratik Gandhi as Sumit Nagindas Gandhi
- Deeksha Joshi as Reena Mehta
- Sanjay Goradia as Dilip Joshi
- Tiku Talsania as Mr. Mehta
- Ojas Rawal as Doctor YM Dave
- Jayesh More as DCP Suresh Nayak
- Kinjal Pandya as Ratna
- Binda Rawal as Bhavna Gandhi
- Kavin Dave as Venky
- Pratap Sachdev as Nagindas Gandhi

== Development ==
"Vaahlam Jaao Ne" shoot commenced in November 2020. The official trailer of the film was launched on 18 October 2022.

== Release ==
The film was released on 4 November 2022.

== Reception ==
=== Critical reception ===
Vaahlam Jaao Ne movie received Positive reviews from critics, Rachana Joshi from Gujarati Mid-Day rated the film 3 stars out of 5.

== Soundtrack ==
Vaahlam Jaao Ne

Soundtrack album by Sachin-Jigar
- Released: 4 November 2022
- Genre: Feature film soundtrack
- Length: 13:59
- Language: Gujarati
- Label: Jio Studios

=== Tracklist ===
All lyrics are written by Bhargav Purohit; all music is composed by Sachin-Jigar.

Track listing
No.	Title	Lyrics	Music	Singer(s)	Length
1.	"Chori Lau"	Bhargav Purohit	Sachin-Jigar	Aditya Gadhvi	3:26
2.	"Muratiyo"	Bhargav Purohit	Sachin-Jigar	Musa Paik	3:29
3.	"Ghelo Re Ghelo"	Bhargav Purohit	Sachin-Jigar	Sachin-Jigar	3:24
4.	"Khoto"	Bhargav Purohit	Sachin-Jigar	Bhoomi Trivedi, Musa Paik	3:40
Total length:					13:59

== See also ==
- List of Gujarati films of 2022
