= Jawab Hum Denge =

- Directed by: Vijay Reddy
- Produced by: K. C. Bokadia
- Starring: Sridevi; Jackie Shroff; Shatrughan Sinha
- Music by: Laxmikant–Pyarelal
- Release date: February 2, 1987
- Country: India
- Language: Hindi

Jawab Hum Denge is a 1987 Indian Hindi-language film directed by Vijay Reddy and produced by K. C. Bokadia. The film's music was composed by Laxmikant–Pyarelal. Released on 2 February 1987, it stars Sridevi, Jackie Shroff, and Shatrughan Sinha. As a trend among late 1980s Hindi films, Jawab Hum Denge also features a monkey as a performer.

The movie is remake of Tamil film Dharma Pathini (1986).

== Plot ==
Union Leader Vijay Saxena is wrongly arrested for killing an employee but manages to come up with an alibi as sub-inspector Jyoti comes to his rescue.

== Cast ==
- Sridevi as Jyoti Verma
- Jackie Shroff as Jaikishan
- Ashok Kumar as Jyoti's uncle
- Shatrughan Sinha as Vijay Saxena
- Amrish Puri as Dhanraj
- Rakesh Bedi as Sher Singh
- Kader Khan as Janardan
- Mac Mohan as Kelkar
- Seema Deo as Jaikishan's mother
- Bharat Bhushan as Dhanraj's injured employee
- Vikas Anand as Mohan
- Satyen Kappu as Vidya and Jyoti's father
- Tiku Talsania as witness / politician
- Asrani as Janardan's employee

== Soundtrack ==
The film's music was composed by Laxmikant–Pyarelal.

Track	Singer(s)
Teri Ankh Mastani Hai	Shabbir Kumar & Kavita Krishnamurthy
Banjaran Main Banjaran	Kavita Krishnamurthy
Mere Kis Kasoor Per	Kavita Krishnamurthy
Hairan Hoon Main	Shabbir Kumar & Anuradha Paudwal
Jab Jab Miyan Bibi Mein	Mohammed Aziz & Anuradha Paudwal
