= Darshan Ashwin Trivedi =

Indian Film director

- દર્શન ત્રિવેદી
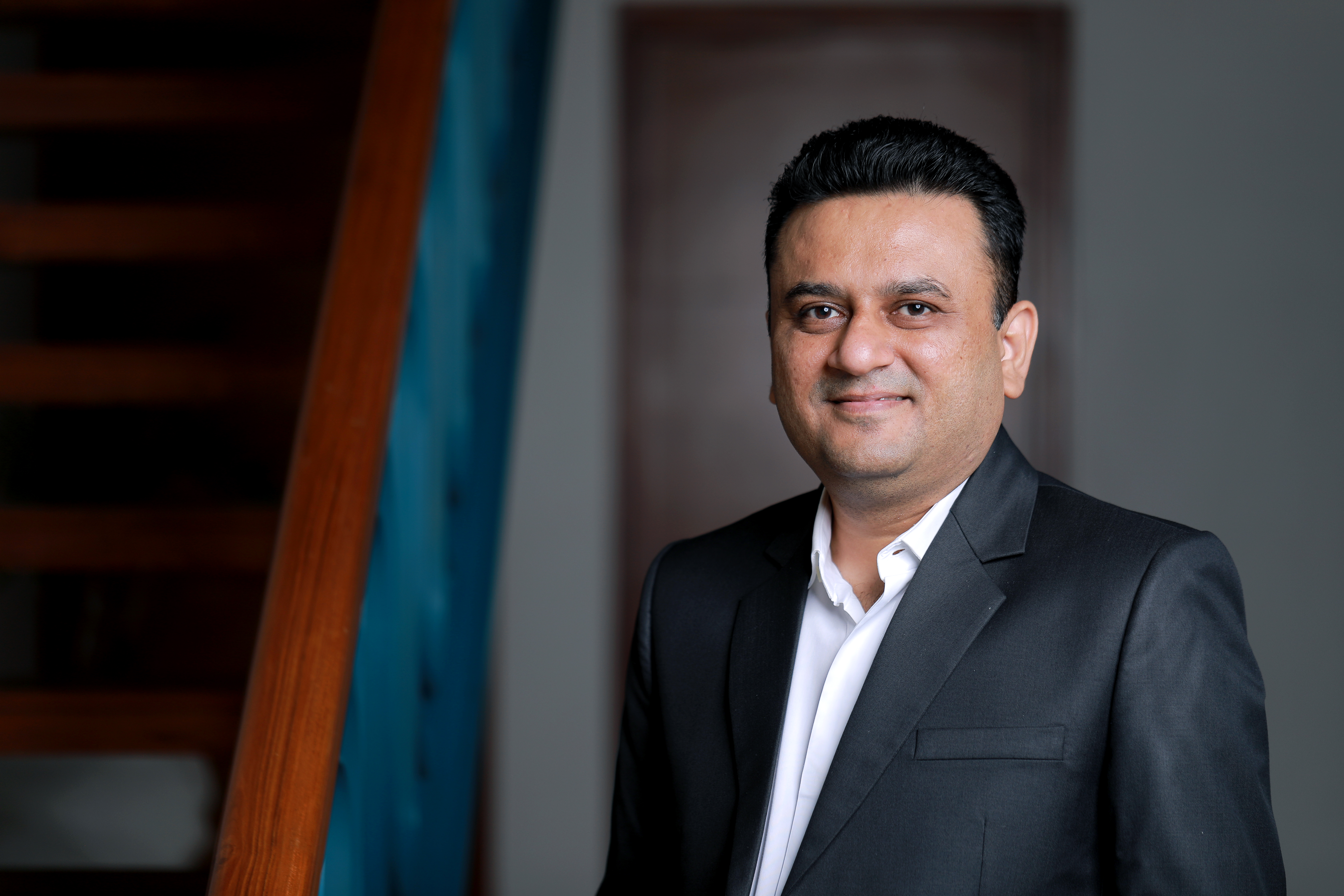
- Born: 4 August 1977 (age 48); Ahmedabad
- Education: PhD
- Alma mater: Gujarat University; Gujarat National Law University
- Occupations: Film director academician
- Organization: MICA (institute)
- Notable work: Mrugtrushna; Mara Pappa Superhero
- Website: Official Website

Darshan Ashwin Trivedi is an Indian film director and academician best known for his contribution for Gujarati cinema. He is known for his movies Mrugtrushna, Mara Pappa Superhero, Lakiro and Keri. He is Adjunct faculty at MICA.

== Early life ==
Darshan Ashwin Trivedi was born on 4 August 1977 in Ahmedabad, India. He has done Master in Development Communications from Gujarat University and PhD from Gujarat National Law University. During his career he has worked with brands like Zoom (Indian TV channel), Reliance Broadcast Network, Moving Pixels, Neela Tele Films.

== Career ==
He started working with radio and television networks in the early years of his career. Darshan has worked with Sony Entertainment Television, Radio Mirchi, Zoom, Reliance Broadcast Network, Moving Pixels, Neela Tele Films. Darshan is the former founder of Gujarati film fraternity.

Darshan started teaching in MICA in 2007. He teaches Media & Entertainment management. He works as an adjunct faculty with MICA. Darshan is the editor of the Indian OTT Platforms Report published by MICA.

Darshan started his filmmaking career in 2018. His debut feature film Mrugtrushna is the first part of the trilogy. His second film Mara Pappa Superhero is written by Sahita Academy awarded writer Raam Mori. His third film Lakiro explores Jazz music for the first time in Gujarati cinema. His fourth film Keri stars Bollywood Actor Rohit Roy and Ahmedabad based Radio Jockey Devaki.

== Filmography ==
=== Films ===
Year	Film	Director	Producer	Writer	Language	Notes
2021	Mara Pappa Superhero	Yes	Tejasvi Vidyut Buch, Milapsinh Jadeja, U.T. Rao	Raam Mori	Gujarati	The film premiered at London Indian Film Festival in June 2021
2022	Mrugtrushna	Yes		Yes	Gujarati	bagged Golden Butterfly and Diploma of Honor for Best Screenplay
2023	Keri	Yes		Yes	Gujarati	on floor
2022	Lakiro	Yes	Yes	Yes	Gujarati	released on 6 January 2023
	Aaj Jaaneki Zidd Na Karo	Yes			Hindi	The film will go on floor in May 2023.
2024	Ek Ruka Hua Faisla	Yes			Hindi	The film will go on floor in Dec 2023
2024	Bicycle Thief	Yes			Hindi	The film's production was completed in June 2024.

== Awards and recognition ==
- Golden Butterfly Award, 33rd International Film Festival for Children and Youth, Iran, Best Screenplay, Mrugtrushna, 2020
- 20th Annual Tiburon International Film Festival, Best Children's Film, Mara Pappa Superhero, 2021
