= The Great Grand Superhero =

2026 Indian superhero film

The Great Grand Superhero: Aliens Ka Aagman
- Theatrical release poster
- Directed by: Manish Saini
- Written by: Manish Saini
- Produced by: Umesh Kumar Bansal; Manish Saini
- Starring: Jackie Shroff; Mihir Godbole; Shivansh Chorge
- Cinematography: Swathy Deepak
- Edited by: Deepa Bhatia
- Music by: Parth Pandya; Ajay Jayanthi
- Production companies: Amdavad Films; Zee Studios
- Distributed by: Zee Studios
- Release date: 29 May 2026
- Running time: 112 minutes
- Country: India
- Language: Hindi
- Box office: ₹1.89 crore

The Great Grand Superhero: Aliens Ka Aagman (transl. The Great Grand Superhero: The Arrival of Aliens) is a 2026 Indian Hindi-language superhero film written, directed and produced by Manish Saini. It stars Jackie Shroff, Mihir Godbole and Shivansh Chorghe.

The film was released theatrically on 29 May 2026.

== Cast ==
- Jackie Shroff as Jagdish Chandra
- Mihir Godbole as Dipu
- Shivansh Chorge as Ladoo
- Jihan Hodar as Chanakya
- Asmi Deo as Chingy
- Bhagyashree as Musi
- Durgesh Kumar as Kannu
- Sharat Saxena as Kartar Singh
- Prateik Smita Patil
- Saharsh Shukla as Alien
- Kumar Saurabh as Alien
- Kundan Kumar as Deepu's Father
- Riddhi Shukla as Deepu's Mother

== Release ==
The film was released in India on 29 May 2026. The release date was announced through promotional posters distributed by the producers in May 2026.

== Reception ==
Rahul Desai of The Hollywood Reporter India described it as "An almost-great children’s film". Nandini Ramnath of Scroll said "Shroff watches benignly over a brood that has most of the funny lines and the winning moments. By never exaggerating his presence and submitting to the script's various turns, Jackie Shroff proves to be the perfect casting choice. Through his generosity and warmth, the movie earns its title." Anuj Kumar from The Hindu wrote " The film cleverly positions the audience as half-insider, half-outsider to the child's fantasy world. We're not fully immersed in the boy's claims, as his gullible classmates are. Instead, we hover at a slight remove, watching the grand myth-making with adult awareness. This distance is where the satire sparkles" Sana Farzeen of India Today rated the film 2.5 out of 5 and called the film a refreshing alternative to darker, violence-driven mainstream films, praising its focus on imagination, friendship, and a reluctant grandfather hero.

Bollywood Hungama gave 2.5 stars out of 5 and said that the film was a "well-intentioned, rare children's film from Bollywood, driven by a novel plot and endearing performances from Jackie Shroff and the young actors. Unfortunately, its potential is pulled down by a disjointed script and puzzling moments." Rishabh Suri of Hindustan Times rated it 3/5 stars and said that the film didn't quite "soar as high as it's [sic] premise promises, but in an era where children's cinema has become a rarity, even an imperfect attempt deserves appreciation." Lachmi Deb Roy of Firstpost said that "the movie is a delightful watch and the performances of each of the actors, especially the young craftsmen are absolutely charming!" BH Harsh of Cinema Express gave 3 stars out of 5 and writes that "Shroff and the brilliant child artists Mihir Godbole and Shivansh Chorghe anchor this delightful film that has more hits than misses."
