= Revanta Sarabhai =

Indian dancer (born 1984)

- રેવંત સારાભાઇ
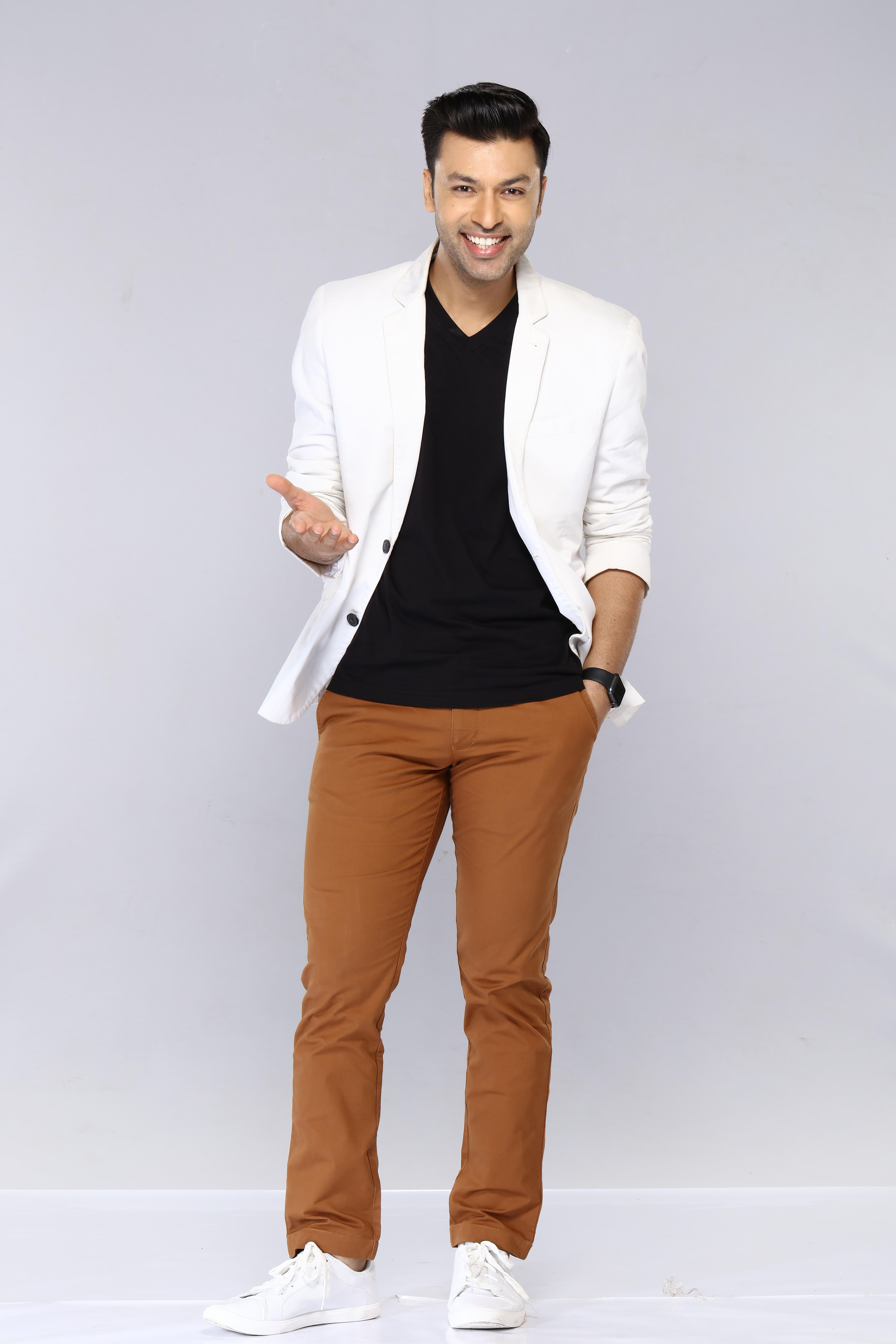
- Born: Revanta Sarabhai-Shah; 2 September 1984 (age 41); Ahmedabad, Gujarat, India
- Education: The University of the Arts; University of Roehampton
- Occupations: Dancer, actor, choreographer
- Years active: 1999–present
- Organization: Darpana Academy of Performing Arts
- Style: Bharata Natyam, Contemporary Dance
- Spouse: Priyanka Raja
- Parent: Mallika Sarabhai (mother)
- Relatives: Vikram Sarabhai (grandfather) Mrinalini Sarabhai (grandmother) Subhashini Ali (aunt) Shaad Ali (cousin)
- Family: Sarabhai family
- Website: www.revantasarabhai.com

Revanta Sarabhai (born 2 September 1984) is an Indian film and theatre actor, dancer, and choreographer from Ahmedabad, Gujarat, India. He is known for being one of the few male Bharatanatyam soloists of his generation.

== Early life ==
He is the son of dancer turned activist Mallika Sarabhai and publisher Bipin Shah; and grandson of the Indian physicist Vikram Sarabhai and dancer Mrinalini Sarabhai.

Sarabhai got his basic dance training from his grandmother Mrinalini Sarabhai and had his solo classical dance début at age eight. He started touring with the Darpana Performing Group in his early teens, starting in 1999 and also got training in a variety of folk, contemporary and martial arts forms from India and abroad.

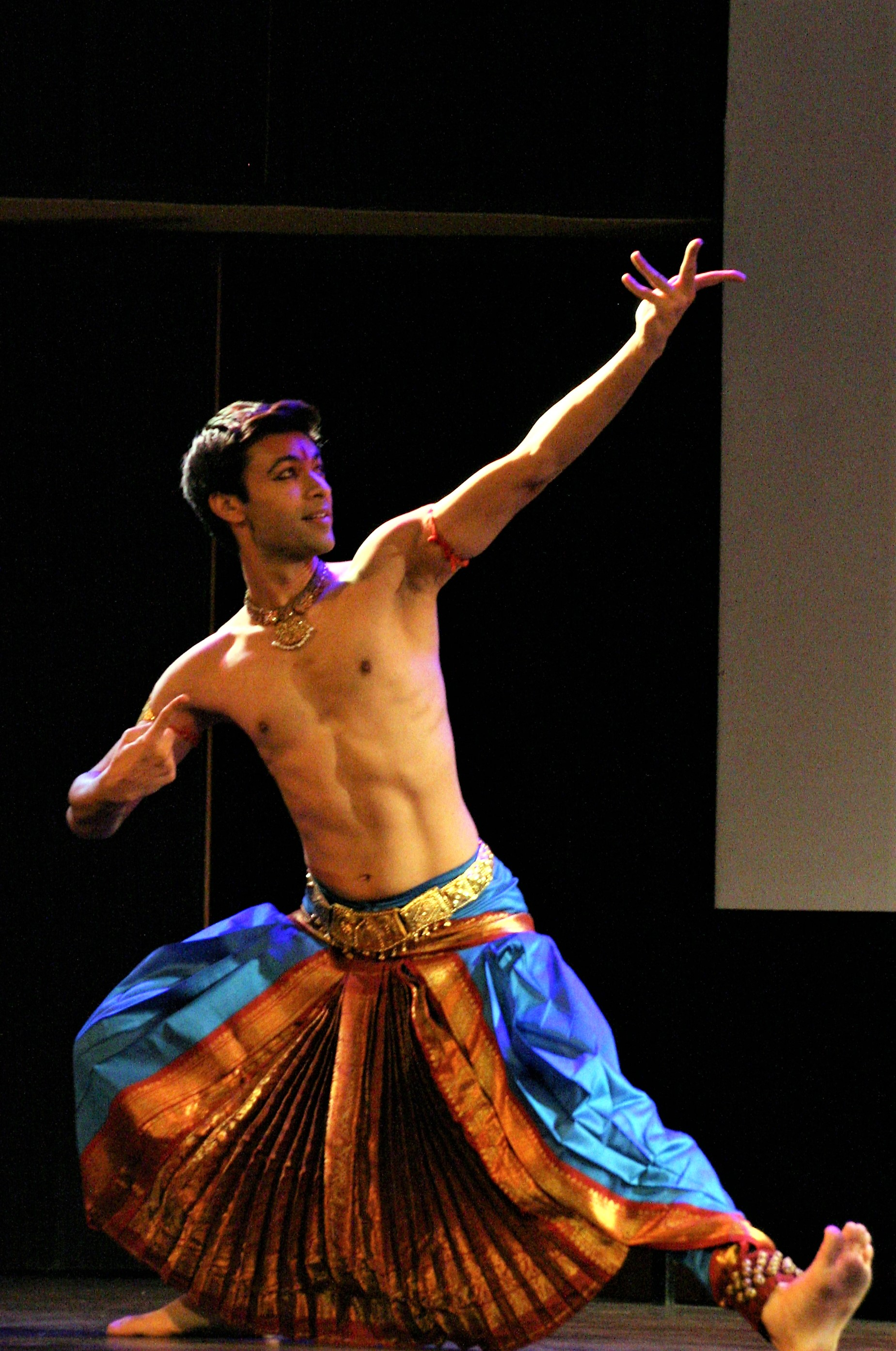
Dance performance in Delhi

== Education and career ==
Sarabhai has a bachelor's degree in fine arts from The University of the Arts, Philadelphia, and a master's degree in performance & creative research from the University of Roehampton, London and worked as an independent dancer and choreographer in Europe before moving to India in 2014. He headed the arts education and training activities at the Darpana Academy of Performing Arts in Ahmedabad from 2014 to 2017, and continues to be an internationally touring performer and choreographer.

Sarabhai has collaborated with several international dancers and choreographers and has been an associate choreographer at Korzo, Den Haag since 2012.

In 2017, Sarabhai made his feature film debut with the Gujarati film Dhantya Open, co-starring Kiran Kumar, Naresh Kanodia, and Manav Gohil. He has since acted in four other Gujarati feature films, including O! Taareee (2017), Mijaaj (2018), Paaghadi (2018) and Mara Pappa Superhero (2021). In 2018, Sarabhai made his television debut as a host on the Gujarati dance reality show Naach Maari Saathe on Colors Gujarati channel.

In 2021, Sarabhai featured in an episode of the web series Cutting on Oho Gujarati.

== Filmography ==
Key
†	Denotes films that have not yet been released

Year	Film	Role	Notes
2010	Dawn	Varun	Short Film
2017	Dhantya Open	Suraj	Gujarati feature Film
2017	O! Taareee	Manthan	Gujarati feature Film
2018	Mijaaj	Yogesh	Gujarati feature Film
2018	Paaghadi	Aditya	Gujarati feature film
2024	Mara Pappa Superhero	Yash	Gujarati feature film

== Television series ==
Year	TV Series	Channel	Role	Notes
2018	Naach Maari Saathe	Colors Gujarati	Host	Dance Reality Show
2023	Rocket Boys 2	Sony LIV OTT	Dancer	Performance
