= Sanjay Goradia =

Indian actor, director and producer

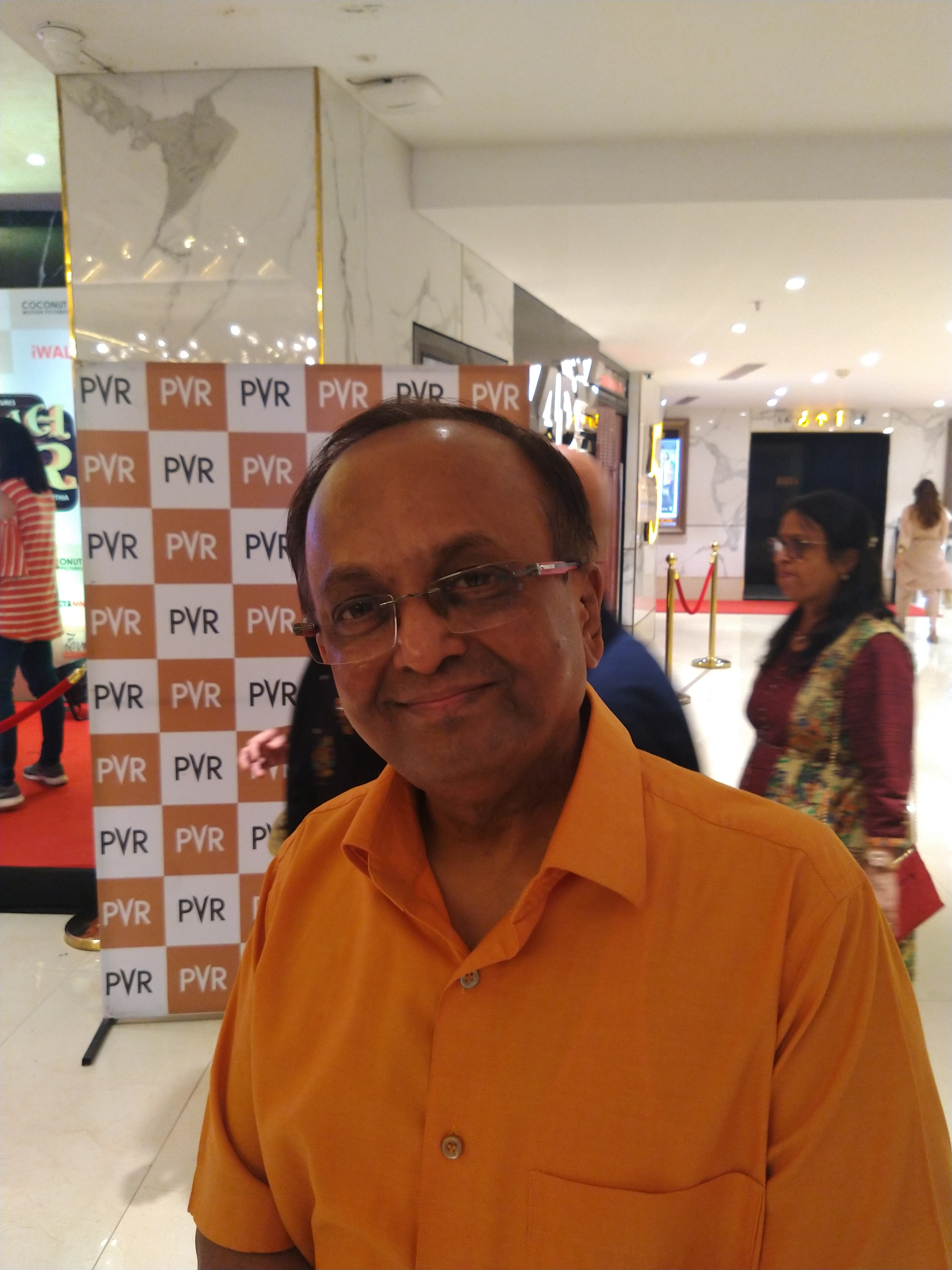
- Sanjay Goradia in 2022
- Born: 17 September 1959 (age 66); Bombay, Bombay State, India
- Occupations: Actor, director, producer
- Spouse: Chandrabhaga Goradia
- Children: 1

Sanjay Goradia is an Indian actor, director and producer. He has produced more than hundred Gujarati plays and acted in quarter of them. He has acted in several Hindi and Gujarati films and has produced television shows.

== Biography ==
Sanjay Goradia started his theatre career on backstage in 1979 for Pagla Ghoda, a play directed by Latesh Shah.

Some of his well known plays include Pappu Paas Thayi Gayo, Aa Namo Bahu Nade Chhe, Chup Raho Khush Raho, De Taali Kona Baap Ni Diwali, Sunder Be Baydiwalo and Bairaono Bahubali. He produced several Hindi plays including Maa Retire Hoti Hai starring Jaya Bachchan, Pati-Patni aur Mein starring Shatrughan Sinha, Chupkay Chupkay starring Zeenat Aman and Lali Leela.

He produced several Gujarati television shows including Tari Ankhno Afini, Aa Family Comedy Che (2014), Kumkum Na Pagla Padya (2015), Shukra Mangal and Sukh Mare Angane which were aired on for Colors Gujarati as well as Marathi television shows Madhu Ithe An Chandra Tithe (2011) and Azunahi Chaand Raat Ahe (2012) on Zee Marathi.

== Theatre ==
Year	Play	Language	Actor	Director	Producer	Writer/Adaptation	Notes
1994	Apnu To Bhai Avun	Gujarati	Yes				
1994	Pagla Ghoda	Hindi	Yes				
1994	Tofani Tapudo	Gujarati	Yes				
1994	Bharat Hamari Mata Baap Hamara Hijda		Yes				
1994	Chal Mere Kaddu Thummak Thum		Yes				
1994	Chor Chor Pakdo Pakdo	Gujarati	Yes				
1994	Chhel Ane Chhabo	Gujarati	Yes		Yes		
1994	Chitkar	Gujarati	Yes				
1994	Himkavach	Gujarati	Yes				
1994	Kanch Na Sambandh	Gujarati	Yes				
1994	Devki	Gujarati	Yes				
1994	Ankh Minchi Ne Bolo Jaihind	Gujarati	Yes				
1994	Sangath	Gujarati	Yes				
1994	Bairi Sher Saali Sava Sher	Gujarati	Yes				
1994	Fatehchand Nun Phulekun	Gujarati	Yes				
1994	Satodio Harshad	Gujarati	Yes				
1994	Prit Piyu Ne Paneter	Gujarati	Yes				
1994	Bhai	Gujarati	Yes				
1994	Aabhas	Gujarati			Yes		
1994	Hands Up				Yes		
1994	Baa Retire Thai Chhe	Gujarati		Yes	Yes		
1994	Karo Kanku Na	Gujarati	Yes		Yes		
1994	Chakraverty	Gujarati			Yes		
1994	Jama Udhaar	Gujarati	Yes		Yes		
	Carry on Professor				Yes		
1995	Ekko Raja Rani	Gujarati	Yes		Yes		
1996	Derani Jethani	Gujarati	Yes		Yes		
	Sharda	Gujarati			Yes		
	A Guide to the Married Man				Yes		
	Pati Yane Patangiyun	Gujarati			Yes		
1998	Mr.Adhikari	Gujarati	Yes		Yes		
1998	Shukan Sava Rupiyo	Gujarati	Yes	Yes	Yes	Yes	
	Koi Dil Khele Koi Daav	Gujarati			Yes		
1999	Maa Retire Hoti Hai	Hindi			Yes		
2000	Dr.Mukta		Yes		Yes		
2001	Jalsa Karo Jayantilal	Gujarati			Yes		
2001	Pati,-Patni Aur Mein	Hindi			Yes		
2002	Shodh Pratishodh	Gujarati			Yes		
2002	Chhanu Ne Chhapnu Kai Thai Nai	Gujarati			Yes		
2002	Ame Lai Gaya Tame Rahi Gaya	Gujarati			Yes		
	Mrs.Manjula Marfatia, B.A. with Gujarati	Gujarati			Yes		
	Masala Mami	Gujarati			Yes		
2003	Chupkay Chupkay	Hindi			Yes		
2003	Chal Chandu Parni Jayae	Gujarati			Yes		
2003	Life Partner	Gujarati			Yes		
2003	Pallavi Bani Parvati	Gujarati			Yes		
2005	Lali Lila	Gujarati			Yes		
	Hum Le Gaye Tum Rahe Gaye	Hindi			Yes		
	Parani Ne Pastayaa	Gujarati			Yes		
	Chokat Rani Chaar Gulam	Gujarati			Yes		
	Chagan Magan Tara Chhapre Lagan	Gujarati			Yes		
	Tako Mundo Taon Taon	Gujarati		Yes		Yes	
2006	Ba Ae Mari Boundary	Gujarati			Yes		
2006	Mummy Vees Ni Dikri Chalis Ni	Gujarati			Yes		
2006	Jadoo Teri Nazar	Gujarati			Yes		
2006	Pappu Pass Thai Gayo	Gujarati	Yes		Yes		
2006	Lali Lila	Hindi			Yes		
2007	Chhel Chhabilo Gujarati	Gujarati	Yes		Yes		
2007	Buddha Ae Mari Sixer	Gujarati			Yes		
2007	Jantar Mantar	Gujarati			Yes		
2007	Parnela Chho To Himmat Rakho	Gujarati			Yes		
2007	Ek Moorakh Ne Evi Tev	Gujarati			Yes		
2007	Prem Karta Puncture Padyu	Gujarati			Yes		
2007	Ba Ne Gher Babo Avyo	Gujarati			Yes		
2007	Chini Mini	Gujarati			Yes		
2007	Miss Ful Gulabi	Gujarati			Yes		
2007	Paranya Toye Punchhadi Vanki	Gujarati		Yes	Yes		
2007	Aa Kokila Nu Kaieeenk Karo	Gujarati	Yes		Yes		
2007	Bhabhu Retire Thai Chhe	Gujarati			Yes		
2007	Harakhpadudi Hansa	Gujarati			Yes		
2007	Sakhna Re To Sasu Nahin	Gujarati			Yes		
2007	Haath Na Karya Haiye Vagya	Gujarati			Yes		
2007	Aa Family Fantastic Chhe	Gujarati	Yes		Yes		
2007	Zero Bani Gayo Hero	Gujarati			Yes		
2007	Bablabhai Ke Babliben	Gujarati			Yes		
2007	Sansaar Ni Semi-Final	Gujarati			Yes		
2007	Sukh Ne Save Karo Dukh Ne Delete Karo	Gujarati			Yes		
2007	Ek Sawario Bijo Bawario	Gujarati			Yes		
2007	Ba Retire Thai Chhe	Gujarati			Yes		
2007	Chup Raho Khush Raho	Gujarati		Yes	Yes		
2007	Em Puchhine Thai Nahi Prem	Gujarati			Yes		
2007	Rupiya Ni Rani Ne Dolario Raja	Gujarati	Yes		Yes		
2007	Are Vahu Have Thayu Bahu	Gujarati			Yes		
2007	Mari Shun Bhool	Gujarati			Yes		
2007	Five Star Aunty Hello Pakistani Hun Gujarati	Gujarati			Yes		
2007	Aa NaMo Bahu Nade Chhe	Gujarati	Yes		Yes		
2007	Garvi Gujratane Rang Rakhyo	Gujarati			Yes		
2007	Damodar Diwano Thayo	Gujarati			Yes		
2007	Maharaj	Gujarati			Yes		
2007	Aa Family Komedy Chhe	Gujarati	Yes		Yes		
2007	Parka Toy Potana	Gujarati			Yes		
2007	Pikchur Haji Baki Chhe Dost	Gujarati			Yes		
2007	Jaishree Krishna Darling	Gujarati			Yes		
2007	Mari Wife Marrykom	Gujarati	Yes		Yes		
2007	Swajan Re Jhooth Mat Bolo	Gujarati			Yes		
2007	Ek Vaanki Chuki Love Story	Gujarati			Yes		
2007	Ba Tane Kyan Rakhu	Gujarati			Yes		
2007	Kitta Buchcha	Gujarati			Yes		
2007	Ek Anokho Karar	Gujarati	Yes		Yes		
2007	Ek Selfie Sajode	Gujarati			Yes		
2007	Adrashyam	Gujarati			Yes		
2007	Ame Darling Ek Bijana	Gujarati			Yes		
2007	Joke Samrat	Gujarati	Yes		Yes		
2007	Prem Nu Paytm	Gujarati			Yes		
2007	Ladies Special	Gujarati			Yes		
2007	Apnu Badhu Kaydesar Chhe	Gujarati			Yes		
2007	Mummy Mari Mind Blowing	Gujarati			Yes		
2007	Googli	Gujarati			Yes		
2007	Sunder Be Baydiwalo	Gujarati	Yes	Yes	Yes		
2007	Buddho Bado Bajigar Chhe	Gujarati			Yes		
2007	Pappa Amara Prime Minister	Gujarati			Yes		
2007	Bhartiben Bhula Padya	Gujarati			Yes		
2007	Tame Ghanu Jeevo	Gujarati			Yes		
2007	Bairaono Bahubali	Gujarati	Yes	Yes	Yes		
2007	Nokrani	Gujarati			Yes		
2007	Bandh Honth Ni Vaat	Gujarati			Yes		
2007	De Taali Kona Baap Ni Diwali	Gujarati	Yes	Yes	Yes		

== Television ==
=== Television (as a producer) ===
- "Madhu Ithe An Chandra Tithe"
- "Azunahi Chaand Raat Ahe on Zee Marathi"
- "Tari ankh No Afini"
- "Aa Family Comedy Che"
- "Kumkum Na Pagla Padya"
- "Sukh Mare Angane on Colors Gujarati"

=== Television (as an actor) ===
- "Shrimaan Shrimati (TV Series)"
- "Filmi Chakker"
- "Teri Bi Chup Meri Bi Chup"
- "Kabhi Yeh Kabhi Woh"
- "Naya Nukkad"
- "Hum Paanch"
- "Nirma Ahaa"
- "Bhago Dukh Aaya"
- "Papad Pol – Shahabuddin Rathod Ki Rangeen Duniya"
- "Maniben.com"
- "Thodi Khushi Thode Gham"
- "Partners"

== Filmography ==
Goradia has acted in several Hindi and Gujarati films.

- Ram Lakhan (Hindi, 1989)
- Khal Nayak (Hindi, 1993)
- Rangeela (Hindi, 1995)
- Is Raat Ki Subah Nahin (Hindi, 1996)
- Ishq (Hindi, 1997)
- Mann (Hindi, 1999)
- Safari (Hindi, 1999)
- Khoobsurat (Hindi, 1999)
- Kachche Dhaage (Hindi, 1999)
- Kahin Pyaar Na Ho Jaaye (Hindi, 2000)
- Ventilator (Gujarati, 2018)
- Made In China (Hindi, 2019)
- Chhichhore (Hindi, 2019)
- Baap No Bagicho (Gujarati, 2022)
- Kehvatlal Parivar (Gujarati, 2022)
- Vaahlam Jaao Ne (Gujarati, 2022)
- Char Fera nu Chakdol (Gujarati, 2023)
- Kamthaan (Gujarati, 2024)
- 31st December (Gujarati, 2024)
- Maharaj (Hindi, 2024)
- Jhamkudi (Gujarati, 2024)
- Maharani (Gujarati, 2025)
- Hip Hip Hurray (Gujarati, 2026)
