= Meghdhanush =

Indian Fusion-Rock band

- Origin: Ahmedabad, Gujarat, India
- Genres: Fusion, Rock
- Years active: 2009–present
- Members: Jainam Modi; Karan Patel; Priyesh Mehta; Ishrat Kalavant; Ujjwal Rishi
- Past members: Dhaivat Jani
- Website: www.meghdhanush.in

Meghdhanush (transl. Rainbow) is an Indian Fusion–Rock band formed in Ahmedabad formed in December 2009, who are widely recognized for their Hindi and Gujarati Fusions and unique covers. They are one of Gujarat's foremost band led by Jainam Modi and Karan Patel. Their signature lies in a contemporary yet rooted sound which connects with the youth and the old. Meghdhanush describes theirs style of experimenting with different genres of music as they believe that different colours of the rainbow represent different emotions, their music does the same.

The band is known for unique cover songs released as singles such as “Shaktiman” (Title Track of the Famous Hindi TV Series of 90s on Doordanshan) and “Lollipop” (Famous Bhojpuri Song). It released its debut album “Mijlas” in 2017 and its acclaimed EP “Folk Rang by Meghdhanush” in 2018.

== Band Members ==
- Jainam Modi – Bass Guitar, Vocals
- Karan Patel – Vocals, Lead Guitar
- Priyesh Mehta – Drums, Percussions, Backing Vocals
- Ishrat Kalavant – Vocals
- Ujjwal Rishi – Lead Guitar

== History ==
Meghdhanush was initially formed for a national level rock band competition based on original songs called “Rock Parva” in December 2009, they stood in top 7 bands from across India where Agnee (band) was the judge. The competition gave them the boost to carry forward and they started creating original music.

They released their first official music video “Shaktiman (Cover)” in March 2014, the video was made by Ahmedabad based production house – Videowala, this gave them a nationwide recognition. YouTube India shared the video and Storypick, ScoopWhoop and many other blogs published an article on the same. This took them to their first television appearance on Entertainment Ke Liye Kuch Bhi Karega on Sony TV and later on MTV RayBan Never Hide Sounds on MTV Indies where in they were the winners for the fusion genre. Post this and the release of their popular single “Baawari” featuring Divya Kumar on MTV Indies in October 2015, they were invited to perform at various music festivals across India and also performed internationally at Turkey and Sri Lanka.

== Discography ==
=== Studio albums ===
- Mijlas (2017)
- Folk Rang by Meghdhanush (2018)

=== Singles ===
- Baawari Feat. Divya Kumar (2015)
- Yaari (2017)

=== Covers ===
- Shaktiman (2014)
- Lollipop (2018)

=== Filmography ===
- Chhello Divas (2015)
- Mijaaj (2018)
- Dhh (2018)
