= Hip Hip Hurray (2026 film) =

2026 Indian Gujarati Horror Comedy film

- Official Poster
- Directed by: Nishith Brahmbhatt
- Written by: Rushikesh Thakkar
- Produced by: Nishith Brahmbhatt
- Starring: Sanjay Goradia; Smit Pandya; Hemin Trivedi; Chetan Daiya; Bhavini Jani
- Cinematography: Pankaj Singh
- Edited by: Ravi Sachdev
- Music by: Gaurav Dhola; DJ KWID
- Production company: Brosis Studios
- Distributed by: Rupam Entertainment
- Release date: 30 July 2026
- Country: India
- Language: Gujarati

Hip Hip Hurray (Gujarati: હિપ હિપ હુરે) is a 2026 Indian Gujarati family horror comedy film directed by Nishith Brahmbhatt and written by Rushikesh Thakkar. Produced by Nishith Brahmbhatt under the banner of Brosis Studios, the film stars Sanjay Goradia, Smit Pandya, Hemin Trivedi, Chetan Daiya, Bhavini Jani and others. The film was released in theaters on 30 July 2026.

== Plot ==
Seven curious school kids discover a group of ghost children trapped within their school. They team up to uncover the truth.

== Cast ==
- Sanjay Goradia
- Smit Pandya
- Hemin Trivedi
- Chetan Daiya
- Bhavini Jani
- Heena Jaikishan

== Soundtrack ==
Hip Hip Hurray

Soundtrack album
- Released: 2026
- Genre: Feature film soundtrack
- Length: 4:26
- Language: Gujarati
- Label: Brosis Studios
External audio
- Hip Hip Hurray Full Album on JioSaavn

=== Track listing ===
All lyrics are written by Janki Gadhavi, Nishith Brahmbhatt; all music is composed by Gaurav Dhola, DJ KWID.

Track listing
No.	Title	Lyrics	Music	Singer(s)	Length
1.	"Kar Taiyari"	Janki Gadhavi, Nishith Brahmbhatt	Gaurav Dhola, DJ KWID	Sukhwinder Singh	2:47
2.	"Tofani Tolaki"	Janki Gadhavi	Gaurav Dhola, DJ KWID	Himalay Trivedi	1:39
Total length:					4:26

== Release ==
The teaser was released on 29 April 2026. The trailer was released on 21 July 2026 through social media platforms and YouTube.

== Reception ==
The film received a mixed-to-positive review from All Tenvow, which praised its family-friendly adventure, performances of the child actors, and emotional storytelling. The review also highlighted the film's blend of fantasy and mystery, while noting that certain portions of the narrative were predictable and the pacing was uneven in parts. It concluded that Hip Hip Hurray is an entertaining watch for audiences seeking a family-oriented fantasy film.

== See also ==
- List of Gujarati films of 2026
- List of Gujarati films
