= Aryan Prajapati =

Indian child actor (born 2008)

- Born: 13 February 2008 (age 18); Chandigarh, India
- Occupation: Actor
- Years active: 2013–present
- Known for: Happu Ki Ultan Pultan

Aryan Prajapati (born 12 February 2008) is an Indian child actor. He has played various roles in television serials and Bollywood feature films. Since 2019, he has been playing the role of Hrithik Singh in the serial Happu Ki Ultan Paltan.

== Filmography ==
=== Film ===
Year	Film	Role
2016	Baaghi	Subbu
2017	Judwaa 2	Young Nandu
2019	Bharat	Young Vilayti
2020	Lootcase	Ayush Kumar
2022	Laal Singh Chaddha	Laal’s son
2024	Madgaon Express	Young Dodo
2025	Jai Mata Ji - Let's Rock	

=== Television ===
Title	Role	Channel
Raavi	Ravinder's Friend	BIG MAGIC
Badi Door Se Aaye Hai	Pritesh Bhatt	SAB TV
Pavitra Rishta	Nikhil	ZEE TV
Saas Bina Sasural	Guest of Chaturvedi's Neighbour for 1 night in Chaturvedi's House	Sony TV
Ishqbaaaz	Sahil Chaturvedi	STAR PLUS
Bahu Hamari Rajni Kant	R.A.M. Rajni and Shaan's son	Life OK
Trideviyaan	Fake Dada ji (Dinanath's Father)	SAB TV
Bhaag Bakool Bhaag	Bhoothnath	Colors TV
Namune	Lalit Agnihotri	SAB TV
Happu Ki Ultan Pultan	Hrithik Singh	&TV
Khatra Khatra Khatra	Himself	Colors TV
