= Maidan-E-Jung =

1995 film by K.C. Bokadia

- Poster
- Directed by: K. C. Bokadia
- Written by: K.C. Bokadia, Subhash Jain (scenario)
- Produced by: Dilip Kankaria
- Starring: Dharmendra; Manoj Kumar; Jaya Prada; Akshay Kumar; Karisma Kapoor; Mukesh Khanna; Amrish Puri; Gulshan Grover; Kader Khan; Shakti Kapoor
- Cinematography: Sudarshan Nag
- Edited by: Govind Dalwadi
- Music by: Bappi Lahiri
- Distributed by: Devyang Arts
- Release date: 14 April 1995
- Country: India
- Language: Hindi
- Budget: ₹ 32.5 million
- Box office: ₹ 72.3 million

Maidan-E-Jung (transl. Battlefield) is a 1995 Indian Hindi-language action drama film directed by K.C. Bokadia. It features an ensemble cast of Dharmendra, Manoj Kumar, Jaya Prada, Akshay Kumar and Karisma Kapoor in the lead roles, with Mukesh Khanna, Amrish Puri and Gulshan Grover featuring in the supporting roles. Also Kader Khan and Shakti Kapoor appear as comic reliefs. This film marks the last on screen appearance of Manoj Kumar, who retired from acting after its release. Maidan-E-Jung released worldwide on 14 April 1995.

== Plot ==
Thakur Ranvir Singh aka Daata Guru is a wealthy, powerful and influential head of a village. He owns and controls all the villagers and their properties. Anyone who dares to raise their voice against him is crushed by his employee, Shankar and his son Guman.

Karan is the youngest son of Daata Guru, who comes back to the village after completing his education and falls in love with Shankar's sister Tulsi. Meanwhile, Shankar saves Daata Guru's widowed daughter-in-law Lakshmi from Guman, who tries to rape her. When Daata Guru learns that Shankar has abducted Lakshmi and has married her, he is enraged and wants Shankar dead. Daata Guru also instigates Karan against Shankar, and threatens to cut off the villagers' water supply if they do not turn in Shankar to him.

Karan discovers the entire truth from Bhua ji and he decides to help Shankar in his fight against Daata Guru.

== Cast ==
- Dharmendra as Shankar
- Manoj Kumar as Master Dinanath
- Jaya Prada as Lakshmi
- Akshay Kumar as Karan Singh
- Karishma Kapoor as Tulsi
- Amrish Puri as Thakur Ranvir Singh aka Daata Guru, Karan's father
- Gulshan Grover as Guman Singh
- Mukesh Khanna as Police DCP Arun
- Dina Pathak as Bhua ji
- Vaishnavi Mahant as Masterji's sister
- Kader Khan as Maganlal
- Shakti Kapoor as Banarsi

== Soundtrack ==
#	Title	Singer(s)
1	"Teera Bole"	Gurdas Mann, Ila Arun
2	"Kya Baat Hai Too"	Kumar Sanu, Alka Yagnik
3	"Kahi Pyaasi Raat"	Amit Kumar, Sapna Mukherjee
4	"Koi Haal Mast Koi Chaal"	Vinod Rathod, Mahendra Kapoor
5	"Shaam Dhal Rahi Teri Yaad"	Kumar Sanu, Sadhana Sargam
6	"Lo Phagun Ritu Aa Gayee"	Udit Narayan, Vinod Rathod, Sadhana Sargam
7	"Tere Joban Ka Ghulam"	Udit Narayan, Kavita Krishnamurthy
