= Aaj Ka Arjun =

1990 Indian film by K. C. Bokadia

- Poster
- Directed by: K. C. Bokadia
- Written by: Santosh Saroj
- Based on: En Thangachi Padichava (Tamil)
- Produced by: K. C. Bokadia
- Starring: Amitabh Bachchan; Jaya Prada; Radhika Sarathkumar
- Music by: Bappi Lahiri
- Production company: BMB Productions
- Release date: 10 August 1990
- Running time: 166 mins
- Country: India
- Language: Hindi

Aaj Ka Arjun (transl. Today's Arjun) is a 1990 Hindi-language action film directed and produced by K. C. Bokadia and starring Amitabh Bachchan and Jaya Prada. The film is based on the 1988 Tamil film En Thangachi Padichava and follows the broad outline of the epic Mahabharata, with a modified storyline centred on Bhima and Arjuna.

Upon release, the film took a record opening. At the 36th Filmfare Awards, Aaj Ka Arjun received two nominations: Best Supporting Actress for Radhika and Best Music Director for Bappi Lahiri.

== Synopsis ==
Thakur Bhupendra Singh is a tyrannical landlord trying to usurp the field property of poor farmers to build his alcohol factory. He faces opposition from Laxmi, Bheema’s sister, who is the only educated person in the village. Laxmi gets saved by Ajit, the Thakur’s son and the two fall in love. With Bheema’s blessing, the two get married. It is soon revealed that this was a ploy by Thakur and Ajit to stop her from mobilising the villagers. Laxmi overhears their conversation and runs to inform the police but is killed in the village center. Bheema in turn kills Ajit and takes responsibility for his nephew. But Bheema is soon arrested for Ajit’s murder and is imprisoned for 7 years, handing his nephew over to Gauri, the love of his life.

Seven years later, Bheema returns and strongly opposes the Thakur when he troubles the villagers. He gets help from Mohan, Gauri’s brother in fighting the Thakur’s goons and bringing him to justice.

== Cast ==
- Amitabh Bachchan as Bheem Singh "Bheema"
- Jaya Prada as Gauri
- Radhika Sarathkumar as Laxmi Singh
- Suresh Oberoi as Mohan
- Kiran Kumar as Lakhan
- Anupam Kher as Police Inspector
- Amrish Puri as Thakur Bhupendra Singh
- Rishabh Shukla as Ajit Singh
- Asrani as Chikoo
- Priti Sapru as Mohan's Wife
- Baby Guddu as Kanhaiya Singh
- Brahmachari as Himself
- Praveen Kumar Sobti as Himself
- Anirudh Agarwal as Himself

== Soundtrack ==
Aaj Ka Arjun

Soundtrack album by Bappi Lahiri
- Released: 1990
- Genre: Feature film soundtrack

The music was composed by Bappi Lahiri and the lyrics were penned by Anjaan. The film has a memorable number "Gori Hai Kalaiyan", tune of which was adapted from the original composition of music director duo Shankar–Jaikishan, with voices lent by Lata Mangeshkar and Shabbir Kumar. The song was recreated in 2025 for the movie Mere Husband Ki Biwi. According to Box Office India, with around 18,00,000 units sold, this film's soundtrack was the year's fifth highest-selling album.

No.	Title	Singer(s)	Length
1.	"Bahena O Bahena"	Kavita Krishnamurthy, Mohammed Aziz	6:24
2.	"Chali Aana Tu Pan Ki"	Amit Kumar, Alka Yagnik	7:43
3.	"Chhod Babul Ka Ghar"	Kavita Krishnamurthy	3:51
4.	"Gori Hain Kalaiyan"	Lata Mangeshkar, Shabbir Kumar	9:39
5.	"Mashuka Mashuka"	Alka Yagnik, Bappi Lahiri, Amrish Puri	9:22
6.	"Na Ja Re" (Female)	Lata Mangeshkar	6:27
7.	"Na Ja Re" (Male)	Amit Kumar	3:20
Total length:			46:46
