= Darshan Jariwala =

Indian actor

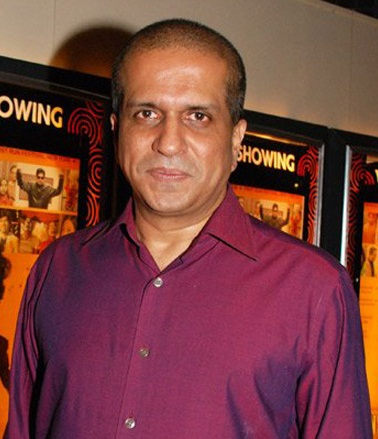
- Darshan Jariwala at the Bombay Talkies play
- Born: 29 September 1958 (age 67); Bombay, Bombay State (now Maharashtra), India
- Occupation: Actor
- Spouse: Apara Mehta (m. 1980; sep. 2003)
- Children: 1

Darshan Jariwala (born 29 September 1958) is an Indian actor who works in Hindi films, television and stage. He won the National Film Award for Best Supporting Actor for Gandhi, My Father. He is popular for playing Chedilal Chaturvedi in the show Saas Bina Sasural which aired on Sony Entertainment Television (India) from 18 October 2010 to 6 September 2012.

== Biography ==
Jariwala is the son of veteran Gujarati actress Leela Jariwala and Vidyasagar Jariwala. He has acted in films as well as on Indian television. One of his most remembered Gujarati TV serials is Narsinh Mehta, about the saint poet and devotee of Krishna. His role of Mahatma Gandhi in the 2007 film Gandhi, My Father put him on the international map.

His Gujarati plays include Hatheli Par BaadBaaki, Patro Mitro, Mulraj Mansion and Andhalo Pato. He acted in a Hindi play, Uncle Samjha Karo and in English theatre Going Solo 2. He ventured into the new age mainstream Gujarati cinema with the Abhishek Jain-directed Bey Yaar, released in 2014.

His company Leela Theatres has coproduced an English Play, Salt & Pepper, starring him, Mandira Bedi, Kuki Grewal and Vikram Kochar, written and directed by Vikranth Pawar, and produced the English comedy Your Place Or Mine? and Gujarati double bill Ramesh Aakhi Raat, comprising two one-act plays based on Ramesh Parekh's writings.

He has acted in Hindi films like Honeymoon Travels Pvt Ltd, Guru, Aap Kaa Surroor, Phata Poster Nikla Hero and Humshakals.

Feroz Abbas Khan (director of Gandhi, My Father and a veteran theatre personality) had approached him for Gandhi's role in his famous play Mahatma v/s Gandhi. But due to date problems, the actor had to let go of the project. However, Feroz was bent on casting him as Gandhi and again approached him for Gandhi, My Father, which finally materialized.

== Personal life ==
In 1982, he married Indian television personality Apara Mehta, with whom he has one daughter. They have been living separately since 2003 due to personal differences but have not divorced yet. He has been living with Anahita Italia since 2010.

== Filmography ==
Year	Film	Role	Notes
2001	Style	Principal Sardesai	
2001	Paagalpan	Malpani	
2003	Xcuse Me	Sardesai	
2006	Continuum	Uncle Pareira	
2007	Aap Kaa Surroor - The Real Luv Story	Khurana; Advocate Ruby James's Business partner	
2007	Gandhi, My Father	Mohandas Karamchand Gandhi	
2007	Aaja Nachle	Guru Makarand	
2007	Honeymoon Travels Pvt. Ltd.	Ram Prasad	
2007	Guru	Anand Patekar	
2008	Halla Bol	Ganpat Rao Gaekwad	
2008	Superstar	M.G.Saxena	
2009	Ajab Prem Ki Ghazab Kahani	Shiv Shankar Sharma	
2009	Life Partner	Darshan Manibhai Patel	
2009	What's Your Raashee?	Devendra 'Devu' Patel	
2009	Rang Rasiya	Chintamani Maharaj	
2010	Rakta Charitra	SP Kanoonga	
2010	Raajneeti	Ramnath Rai	
2010	Paiyaa	Charulatha's uncle	Tamil film
2011	F.A.L.T.U	Virani	
2011	Aarakshan	Anirudh Chaudhary	
2011		MLA Kapadia	Marathi film
2012	Ajab Gazabb Love	Yashvardhan Grewal	
2012	Rowdy Rathore	DGP Suraj Prakash Sharma IPS	
2012	Joker	Mukhia	
2012	Chakradhaar	Principal	
2012	Kahaani	Col. Pratap Bajpayee	
2013	Phata Poster Nikla Hero	Jt Commissioner of Police	
2013	Commando	Col. Akhilesh Sinha	
2014	Humshakals	Cyrus Patel	
2014	Entertainment	Mr.Lokhande	
2014	Bey Yaar	Jeetubhai Bhatt	Gujarati film
2014	Million Dollar Arm	Vivek	
2015	Sense8	Manendra Rasal	
2015	Love Exchange		
2016	Ek Tha Hero	Bade Babuji	
2016	Kyaa Kool Hain Hum 3	Surya Kartajiya	
2016	Romance Complicated	Tiku Mamaji	
2017	Viceroy's House	Guptaji	
2017	Sweetiee Weds NRI	Bhoolabhai Desai	
2017	Mumbai-Varanasi Express	Krishnakant Jhunjhunwala	
2017	Patel Ki Punjabi Shaadi	KBC Host	
2018	Oxygen		Gujarati film
2018	Akoori	Dara Irani	Web Series on ZEE5 Originals
2021	Radhe	Home Secretary	
2022	Life's Good		
2022	Aum Mangalam Singlem	Gujarati film	
2023	Shubh Yatra	Master	Gujarati film
2023	Aankh Micholi	Rohit's Maternal uncle	
2024	Kamthaan	Prabhusin	Gujarati film
2024	Sector 36		Netflix film
2024	Adbhut	Rakesh Malhotra	
2024	Fakt Purusho Maate	Purshottam	Gujarati film
2025	All The Best Pandya	Hasmukh Pandya	Gujarati film
2025	Interrogation	Vishesh Ishkaran Parashar	Hindi
2025	Saale Aashiq	Raghubir Kiwal	Hindi
2026	Gabru		Hindi

== Television ==
- Narsinh Mehta (unknown) as Narsinh Mehta
- Kya Baat Hai (1997) as Ram Dayal Mehta
- Chandan Ka Palna Resham Ki Dori as Nirang Bhimani on Zee TV
- Kitne Kool Hai Hum (2002)
- Saas Bina Sasural (2010–2012) as Cheddilal Anandilal Chaturvedi
- Adaalat (2012) as K. D. Pathak's father
- Maan Na Maan Main Tera Mehmaan as Shakuni (cameo)
- Muh Boli Shaadi (2015) as Ashok Tiwari
- Ek Tha Raja Ek Thi Rani (2015) as Gayatri's father
- Baa Bahoo Aur Baby (2006–2007) as Dr. Akhilesh Jha
- Permanent Roommates (Season 2) (2016)
- The Good Karma Hospital (2017) as Ram Nair
- Sargam Ki Sadhe Satii (2021) as Chedilal Awasthi
- Kabhi Neem Neem Kabhi Shahad Shahad as Eeshwar Jindal

== Awards ==
	Award	Category	Work	Result	Ref.
2008	Silver Lotus Award	Best Supporting Actor	Gandhi, My Father	Won	
