= Pyaar Ke Do Pal =

- Film poster
- Directed by: Rajiv Mehra
- Produced by: Parvesh C. Mehra
- Starring: Mithun Chakraborty; Jaya Prada; Simple Kapadia; Krishan Dhawan; Jagdeep; Tiku Talsania; Anjan Srivastav; Lalita Pawar
- Music by: Anu Malik
- Release date: 15 August 1986 (India)
- Running time: 130 minutes
- Language: Hindi

Pyar Ke Do Pal is a 1986 Indian Hindi-language film directed by Rajiv Mehra, starring Mithun Chakraborty, Jaya Prada, Simple Kapadia, Krishan Dhawan, Jagdeep, Tiku Talsania, Lalita Pawar and Anjan Srivastav.

== Summary ==
Twins Sunil and Anil live with their father Ashok Choudhary and mother Geeta Choudhary respectively as per court order. The children meet each other at Scout camp and decides to re-unite their parents. The parents had a misunderstanding on an abortion issue as Geeta Choudhary mentioned her name to help her friend Rajni Thakur get married. The climax reveals the exact issue and whether they sort everything out.

== Cast ==
- Mithun Chakraborty as Ashok Choudhary
- Jaya Prada as Geeta Choudhary
- Simple Kapadia as Rajni Thakur
- Krishan Dhawan as Geeta's dad
- Jagdeep as Scout Master
- Bindu as Paro
- Satyendra Kapoor as Viren Thakur
- Shubha Khote as Mary Amma
- Amrit Pal as Amrit
- Lalita Pawar as Paro's mom
- Anjan Srivastav as Dr. Mehta
- Tiku Talsania as Lakhan
- Ashutosh Thakur (child Artist) as Anil and Sunil (Dual Role)

== Music ==
1. "Pyar Ke Do Pal" - Shabbir Kumar, Baby Munmi
2. "Kabse Tadap Rahe Hai Kuch Khyal Kijiye" - Dilraj Kaur
3. "Main Hoon Main, Tu Hai Tu" - Baby Munmi
4. "Mere Daddy Kitne Pyare Hai" - Baby Munmi, Shabbir Kumar
5. "Daddy Yaad Aate Hai" - Kavita Krishnamurthy, Baby Munmi
