= Mrugtrushna =

- Official Poster
- Directed by: Darshan Ashwin Trivedi
- Written by: Darshan Ashwin Trivedi
- Screenplay by: Darshan Ashwin Trivedi
- Story by: Darshan Ashwin Trivedi
- Produced by: Mrinal Kapadia; Devdutt Kapadia
- Starring: Jayesh More; Ragi Jani; Karan Patel; Nishma Soni; Arya Sagar; Khush Tahilramani
- Cinematography: Anil Chandel
- Edited by: Burzin Unwalla
- Music by: Nishith Mehta
- Release date: 20 May 2022
- Country: India
- Language: Gujarati

Mrugtrushna: The Other Side of the River is a Gujarati film directed by Darshan Ashwin Trivedi, starring Jayesh More, Karan Patel, Nishma Soni, Arya Sagar, and Khush Tahilramani. The plot follows four children living on the bank of the river and their dreams of crossing the river. The film is produced by Mrinal Kapadia and Devdutt Kapadia, and co-produced by Burzin Unwalla, Nishith Mehta, and Darshan Trivedi.

Mrugtrushna is the first installment of Trivedi's 'Illusion trilogy'. The dialogues of the film are written by Ankit Gor and Gaurang Anand. Film's music is composed by Nishith Mehta. The screenplay is written by the director. The film was selected for the 33rd International Film Festival for Children and Youth and won the Golden Butterfly and Diploma of Honor for Best Screenplay.

It was released in India on 20 May 2022.

== Cast ==
- Jayesh More as Dost
- Vishal Shah as Banevi
- Sharvary Joshi as Kanchan Didi
- Khush Tahilramani as Sameer
- Bharat Thakkar as Gagan's Father
- Ragi Jani as Ganpat Kaka
- Nirmit Vaishnav as Sameer's Father
- Nishma Soni as Tara
- Arti Zala as Foi
- Arya Sagar as Tejas
- Komal Panchal as Gagan's Mother
- Pauravi Joshi as Sameer's Mother
- Jay Krushna Rathod as Mastar
- Parmeshwar Sirshekar as Tara's Father
- Happy Bhavasar as Tejas' Mother

== Plot ==
The plot of the film revolves around four children living at the bank of the river, and their fantasy about the world across the river. The plot follows their journey how they cross the river to discover the world across.

== Production ==
Films core subjects are the 'illusory experiences' and the 'power of a dream'.

Trivedi wrote the script of the film originally in English, and then transformed it into Chhota Udaipur dialect, a variety of Gujarati language. The production work of the film was started in 2018 and completed in 2019. The film was set and shot in Chhota Udaipur, Hanfeshwar, Polo Forest, on the banks of river Narmada, Varsoda haveli and in tribal belt.

== Release ==
It was released in India on 20 May 2022.

== Reception ==
The film was screened at Moscow International Children's Film Festival (2021), the only Indian film selected for the festival. It was also screened at UK Asian Film Festival (2021).

== Accolades ==
Award	Category	Recipient(s) and nominee(s)	Result
International Film Festival for Children and Youth	Golden Butterfly and Diploma of Honor for Best Screenplay	Darshan Ashwin Trivedi	Won
