= Dhh =

- Film poster
- Directed by: Manish Saini
- Screenplay by: Manish Saini
- Story by: Manish Saini; Aditya Vikram Sengupta
- Produced by: Amruta Parande; Manish Saini; Rajan Saini; Santosh Sharma
- Starring: Naseeruddin Shah; Kahaan; Karan Patel; Kuldeep Sodha
- Cinematography: Prahlad Gopakumar
- Edited by: Niraj Voralia
- Music by: Meghdhanush
- Production company: Amdavad Films Private Limited
- Distributed by: Viacom18 Motion Pictures
- Release dates: 13 November 2017 (International Children's Film Festival India); 28 September 2018 (India)
- Running time: 128 minutes
- Country: India
- Language: Gujarati

Dhh (Gujarati: ઢ) is a 2017 Indian Gujarati children's film directed by Manish Saini. The film won National Film Award for Best Feature Film in Gujarati at the 65th National Film Awards.

== Plot ==
Gungun, Bajrang and Vakil are weak in studies. They skip school and go to nearby town to see the show of their favorite magician Surya Samrat when they learn that he is performing there. With annual examinations very near, they write to magician to help because they believe that only he can help them with magic trick to increase their results. To their surprise, they receive reply and gifts. The magician tells them to teach all things they need to study to a small doll which in turn will help them with that education in examinations. The boys teach the doll in turns and eventually their results improve.

== Cast ==
- Naseeruddin Shah as magician Surya Samrat
- Kahaan as Gungun
- Karan Patel as Kapil
- Kuldeep Sodha as Bajrang
- Brijendra Kala as Hindi teacher
- Sunil Vishrani as Maths Teacher
- Amit Divetia as School Principal
- Archan Trivedi as Dadaji
- Krishil Rajpal as Classmate
- Arya Sagar as Classmate
- Prapti Mehta as Classmate
- Sanskar Jadav as Classmate
- Ronak Jogi as Classmate
- Parth Yadav as Classmate
- Pari Yadav as Classmate
- Neel Patel as Classmate

== Production ==
Saini had the inspiration for the story when attended a magic show during his college days and enthusiastic reaction of children to show. Regarding the choice to make a children's film, Saini said, "Childhood is universal and hence everybody likes films on children. Moreover, you can make a good story of what you have experienced. We, as children, always wanted that we get a break from school." The film title was registered in 2010, however, Saini could not move ahead due to lack of funds. After finishing the script, he sent the script to Naseeruddin Shah, who responded positively and agreed to do the film. The film was primarily shot in Ahmedabad, Gandhinagar, and Viramgam.

The music for the film was composed by Ahmedabad based fusion rock band Meghdhanush, and consists of four tracks.

== Reception ==
The film was selected for 2018 Toronto International Film Festival in the kids category. The film won the Audience Choice Award at 2018 UK Asian Film Festival. The film won the National Film Award for Best Feature Film in Gujarati at the 65th National Film Awards.

The film was first screened at International Children's Film Festival India on 13 November 2017, and was widely released on 28 September 2018.
