= Dharma Durai (1991 film) =

- Theatrical release poster
- Directed by: Rajasekhar
- Screenplay by: Panchu Arunachalam
- Based on: Deva by M. D. Sundar
- Produced by: S. Ramanathan; S. Sivaraman
- Starring: Rajinikanth; Gautami
- Cinematography: V. Ranga
- Edited by: Vittal
- Music by: Ilaiyaraaja
- Production company: Raasikala Mandhir International
- Release date: 14 January 1991
- Country: India
- Language: Tamil

Dharma Durai (transl. Righteous Lord) (Note: Also the title character.) is a 1991 Indian Tamil-language action drama film directed by Rajasekhar and written by Panchu Arunachalam. A remake of the 1989 Kannada film Deva, it stars Rajinikanth and Gautami, with Madhu, Charan Raj, Nizhalgal Ravi and Vaishnavi in supporting roles. The film revolves around the title character seeking revenge on his younger brothers for taking advantage of his innocence.

Rajasekhar initially began work on a film titled Kaalam Maaripochu (transl. The Times Have Changed) with Rajinikanth starring, but the project was dropped, with the same crew instead deciding to remake Deva. The film was released on 14 January 1991, and emerged a major success, running for over 175 days in theatres. It was the last film directed by Rajasekhar, who died 100 days after its release.

== Plot ==
The story begins with a young couple, Balu and Ishwarya, being chased by some goons. Ishwarya is the daughter of Rajadurai and had eloped with her boyfriend Balu against the wishes of Rajadurai. Rajadurai sends his goons to track down the couple. When the goons finally track down the couple in a forest and start beating up Balu, a man comes to the couple's rescue. When Rajadurai and his brother Ramadurai find out about this man, they rush over to his hideout in the forest, only to escape in fear when they see him. The couple is scared and puzzled as to how the man could induce so much fear in the brothers. The man's wife Parvathi then tells the couple the story of the man, whose name is Dharmadurai.

Dharmadurai was a farmer in the village Valliyur. He was the elder brother of Rajadurai and Ramadurai. He had showered so much love and affection on his younger brothers and even borrowed ₹ 30,000 for their "education", much against the wishes of his father, who fully knew that his younger sons were crooked and evil. He even got Rajadurai married to Vaibhavi, a girl whom Rajadurai had raped, to save him from a jail term. The brothers however, showed no affection for Dharmadurai and used his innocence for their sinister desires. Rajadurai convinced Dharmadurai to borrow ₹ 6 lakhs so that he could "start a business". Using this money, Rajadurai and Ramadurai moved to Madras and started engaging in smuggling. They later double-crossed their smuggler boss Jose by keeping all the items meant to be smuggled and also lodging a police complaint against his son Ajay for their own benefit and soon became rich due to their illegal activities.

One day, Dharmadurai went to Madras when he heard that Ramadurai was going to get engaged to a rich girl and leave with her for the United States to "pursue higher studies". The brothers did not receive him warmly and humiliated him that evening at a farewell party organised for Ramadurai. Later that night, Ajay, who had been released from jail, entered their house to kill Ramadurai in retaliation for having double-crossed Jose and his gang. Ramadurai killed Ajay and convinced Dharmadurai to take the blame for the murder, who was sentenced to seven years imprisonment as a result. The brothers then got Jose and his henchmen also arrested. While Dharmadurai was in jail, Parvathi gave birth to a baby boy.

A few years later, Rajadurai and Ramadurai decided to sell off their father's house and property to "repay the ₹ 6 lakhs Dharmadurai had borrowed". When their father opposed their move, the brothers killed him and drove Parvathi and her son out of the house. With nowhere else to go, Parvathi and her son moved to Madras. The small boy was also eventually killed by Ramadurai when he recognised him as the murderer of his grandfather. With no home, her husband imprisoned and her son dead, a grieving Parvathi took up the job of a housemaid in Madras. Soon, Dharmadurai completed his jail sentence. When he found out about Parvathi's plight and how his brothers had betrayed him, he rushed over to the brothers' house and thrashed them mercilessly, only stopping when their wives intervene. Following this, he disowned them and moved to the forest with Parvathi.

In the present day, Jose and his henchmen get released from jail and kidnap Rajadurai and Ramadurai in retaliation for betraying them. On Parvathi's advice, a reluctant Dharmadurai goes to rescue his brothers. He rescues them, following which they seek his forgiveness, which he accepts.

== Cast ==
- Rajinikanth as Dharmadurai
- Gautami as Parvathi Dharmadurai
- Madhu as Pandidurai Thevar
- Charan Raj as Rajadurai
- Nizhalgal Ravi as Ramadurai
- Sivaraman as Jose's uncle (guest appearance)
- Vaishnavi as Vaidehi
- Senthil as Alagappan
- Dilip as Balu
- Mohan Raj as Jose
- Ajay Rathnam as Ajay
- Ve. Aadai Moorthy as Velappan

== Production ==
The director Rajasekhar initially started a film titled Kaalam Maaripochu, with Rajinikanth, Manjula, Ramesh Aravind and Senthil among others starring. After some days of filming, the project and story were dropped. The same crew instead decided to remake the 1989 Kannada film Deva, and the project was titled Dharma Durai. The film was already scheduled to release for Pongal 1991, but production was disrupted due to certain circumstances. To avoid disappointing his fans, Rajinikanth worked continuously for 72 hours to ensure the film was completed and released per schedule. Initially, the role of Pandidurai was supposed to be played by Sivaji Ganesan, but due to health issues, he could not accept the project and suggested Madhu as his replacement.

== Soundtrack ==
The soundtrack was composed by Ilaiyaraaja. The lyrics for all the songs were written by Panchu Arunachalam except "Aanenna Pennena", which was written by Gangai Amaran. The song "Onnu Rendu" is set to the raga Sankarabharanam, and "Maasi Maasam" is set to either Agni Kopam, or Shuddha Dhanyasi. This song was reused by Ilaiyaraaja as "Enno Ratrulosthayi" in the Telugu film Dharma Kshetram (1992), which was remixed for the Telugu film Amigos (2023). The original Tamil version was remixed by Srikanth Deva for Pandi (2008).

All lyrics are written by Panchu Arunachalam, except where noted.

Track listing
No.	Title	Singers	Length
1.	"Aanenna Pennena" (Lyrics:Gangai Amaran)	S. P. Balasubrahmanyam	5:45
2.	"Annan Enna Thambi Enna"	K. J. Yesudas	5:00
3.	"Maasi Maasam"	K. J. Yesudas, Swarnalatha	4:59
4.	"Onnu Rendu"	Mano, S. Janaki	4:49
5.	"Santhaikku Vantha Kili"	S. P. Balasubrahmanyam, S. Janaki	5:27
Total length:			26:00

== Release and reception ==
Dharma Durai was released on 14 January 1991, during Pongal. N. Krishnaswamy The Indian Express wrote that the film "has sequences that hold water" praising Rajinikanth because he "shows split second timing in delivering comic lines in a good part of the film". Sundarji of Kalki reviewed the film more negatively, criticising the writing and calling it strictly for Rajinikanth's fans. On the 100th day celebrations, Rajasekhar died in a car accident, making this his last release. The film ran for over 175 days in theatres, and became a commercial hit. Gangai Amaran won the Cinema Express Award for Best Lyrics Writer.

== Bibliography ==
- Sundararaman (2007) [2005]. Raga Chintamani: A Guide to Carnatic Ragas Through Tamil Film Music (2nd ed.). Pichhamal Chintamani. OCLC 295034757.
