= Shabbir Kumar =

Indian singer (born 1954)

- Born: Shabbir Shaikh; 26 October 1954 (age 71); Baroda, Bombay State, India
- Occupation: Playback singer
- Years active: 1981–present
- Website: shabbirkumar.com
- Musical career
- Genre: Filmi
- Instrument: Vocals

Shabbir Kumar (born 26 October 1954) is an Indian Legendary playback singer, notable for his work in Bollywood. He became famous as an imitator of Mohammed Rafi, and sang several hit songs in the 1980s.

== Early life ==
Shabbir Kumar was born Shaikh Shabbir Ahmed, on 26 October 1954 in Baroda, Gujarat. He was eldest of the ten siblings, and had no formal training in music. He became interested in singing as a child, and gained attention for imitating the voice of Mohammed Rafi. By his early 20s, his stage shows became popular in Gujarat. He personally met Rafi in 1972 at a recording session, and drew a pencil sketch of Rafi. In 1974, he met Rafi at a stage show in Ahmedabad, where he was introduced as the "local Rafi". He claims that when police attempted to disperse the crowd at Rafi's funeral in 1980, his wristwatch and pen fell into Rafi's open grave and were buried there.

After Rafi's death in 1980, Shabbir Kumar sang Rafi's songs at Ek Raat Rafi Ke Naam, an event organized to honor Rafi. This made Shabbir Kumar more popular, and he started doing several stage shows.

== Bollywood career ==
Music director Usha Khanna noticed Shabbir Kumar, and called him for an audition, where she asked him to sing two of Rafi's songs - Teri Galiyon Mein and Main Yeh Soch Kar. She offered him a song in the 1981 movie Tajurba. The song featured only three lines by Shabbir Kumar; the other singers were Amit Kumar, Lata Mangeshkar, Suresh Wadkar, and Usha Mangeshkar. Usha Khanna promoted him in the film industry, and he got a chance to sing his first solo for the movie Sardar.

Manmohan Desai, the director of the movie Coolie (1983), wanted someone with Rafi's voice to sing the songs for the movie. Usha Khanna recommended Shabbir Kumar to him, and the movie's music director Laxmikant invited Shabbir Kumar to Mumbai for an audition. The Coolie songs, filmed on Amitabh Bachchan, gave Shabbir Kumar his big break.

Subsequently, R.D. Burman offered him songs in the movie Betaab (1983). While recording a duet he became nervous, and his co-singer Lata Mangeshkar paused the recording to calm him down before a retake. The duet - Jab Hum Jawan Honge - became a hit. He went on to with other notable music directors, including Chitragupta, Bappi Lahiri, Anu Malik, and Jatin-Lalit. He sang in several languages, including Hindi, Urdu, Marathi, Bengali, Punjabi, Rajasthani, Bhojpuri and Gujarati.

Shabbir Kumar sang around 3700 songs for about 250 movies. His popular songs include Zindagi Har Kadam from Meri Jung (1985), Tumse Milkar Na Jane Kyun from Pyar Jhukta Nahin (1985), Zihale Maskin from Ghulami (1985) and Gori Hain Kalaiyan from Aaj Ka Arjun (1990).

Gradually, Shabbir Kumar's career declined as Mohammed Aziz and Anwar became more popular as imitators of Mohammad Rafi. He then focused on stage singing, performing in the US, UAE, Europe and South Africa, besides India. In the 1990s, he tried to shed his image of being a Rafi clone. Occasionally, he sang for Hindi films, including the 2010 movie Housefull. In 2012, he became involved in a controversy with Lata Mangeshkar, when he challenged her claim that Rafi had written her a letter of apology. In 2023, he appeared on The Kapil Sharma Show.

Shabbir Kumar's music certifications include 34 Gold Discs and 16 Platinum Discs.

== Personal life ==
Shabbir Kumar is also a painter and sketcher. His wife Mehtaab died on 9 May 2021, a month before their 49th wedding anniversary. His son Dilshaad Shaikh is a music director; he has two daughters - Tehzim and Rubina Mallick.

== Discography ==
- "Zihaale-E-Miskin" from Ghulami (1985), (duet with Lata Mangeshkar), composed by Laxmikant-Pyarelal
- "Aanewale saal ko salaam" from Aap Ke Saath (1986), (Dialogues with Aruna Irani), composed by Laxmikant-Pyarelal
- "Sun Rubiya Tumse" from Mard (1985), composed by Anu Malik
- "Yaad Teri Aayegi" from Ek Jaan Hain Hum (1983), composed by Anu Malik
- "Apne Dilse Badi Dushmani" from Betaab (1983), composed by Rahul Dev Burman
- "Badal Yun Garajta Hai" from Betaab (1983), (duet with Lata Mangeshkar)
- "Jab Hum Jawan Honge" from Betaab (1983), (duet with Lata Mangeshkar)
- "Teri Tasveer Mil Gayee" from Betaab (1983)
- "Tumne Di Awaaz" from Betaab (1983)
- "Kangna Oye Hoye Kangna" from Woh Saat Din (1983), composed by Laxmikant–Pyarelal
- "Pyar Kiya Nahi Jaata" from Woh Saat Din (1983), (duet with Lata Mangeshkar)
- "Saari duniya ka bojh" from Coolie (1983), composed by Laxmikant–Pyarelal
- "Mubarak Ho Tum Sabko Haj Ka Mahina" from Coolie (1983)
- "Humka Issaq Hua Hai" from Coolie (1983)
- "Accident Hogaya Rabba Rabba" from Coolie (1983)
- "Mujhe Peene ka Shokh Nahin" Coolie (1983) (duet with Alka Yagnik)
- "Bol Do Mitti Bol Soniye" Sohni Mahiwal (1984), composed by Anu Malik, (duet with Asha Bhosle)
- "Mujhe Dulhe Ka Sehra" Sohni Mahiwal (1984), (duet with Asha Bhosle)
- "Tumse Milkar Naa Jaane Kyon" from Pyar Jhukta Nahin (1985), composed by Laxmikant–Pyarelal
- "Tumhe Apna Saath Banane Se" from Pyar Jhukta Nahin (1985), (duet with Lata Mangeshkar)
- "Chahe Lakh Toofan Aaye" from Pyar Jhukta Nahin (1985), (duet with Lata Mangeshkar)
- "Ae Doctor Babu" from Piya Ke Gaon (1985), (duet with Alka Yagnik)
- "Zeehal-e-Musqeen" from Ghulami (1985), composed by Laxmikant Pyarelal, (duet with Lata Mangeshkar)
- "Zindagi Har Kadam Ek Nayi Jung" from Meri Jung (1985), composed by Laxmikant–Pyarelal, (duet with Lata Mangeshkar)
- "Dil Beqaraar tha" from Teri Meherbaniyan (1985), composed by Laxmikant–Pyarelal, (duet with Anuradha Paudwal)
- "Motor Yaaron Ki" Phaansi Ke Baad (1985), composed by Anu Malik, (duet with Asha Bhosle)
- "Tu ladki number 1 hai" Loha (1987) (duet with Alka Yagnik)
- "Teri Meherbaniyan" from Teri Meherbaniyan (1985), composed by Laxmikant–Pyarelal
- "Buri Nazarwale Tera" from Mard (1985), composed by Anu Malik
- "O Maa Sheron wali" from Mard (1985), composed by Anu Malik
- "Aana Jana Laga Rahega" from Giraftaar (1985), composed by Bappi Lahiri
- "Pyar Ke Do Pal Koh" from Pyar Ke Do Pal (1986), composed by Anu Malik
- "Jaano Jaanam Jaaneman" from Sultanat (1986), composed by Kalyanji Anandji
- "Jab Jab Kisi Ladke ko" from Kala Dhanda Goray Log (1986), (duet with Anuradha Paudwal)
- "Gali Gali Badnaam Hogaya" from Karamdaata (1986), composed by Anu Malik
- "Hairaan Hoon Main" from Jawab Hum Denge (1987), (duet with Anuradha Paudwal)
- "Mere Yaar Ko Mere Allah" from Dacait (1987), composed by Rahul Dev Burman
- "Tujhe Itna Pyaar Karen" From Kudrat Ka Kanoon (1987), with Lata Mangeshkar
- "Shaadi Shaadi Ratte Ratte Main To Dubli Ho" (1987), from Dharti Ki Aawaz
- "Saajan Aajao Wada Yeh" from Aag Hi Aag (1987), composed by Bappi Lahiri
- "So Gaya Ye Jahan" From Tezaab (1988), Trio with Nitin Mukesh & Alka Yagnik, composed by Laxmikant–Pyarelal
- "Mausam Awaazen De Raha Hai" From Mera Ghar Mere Bachche (1985), Trio with Anuradha Paudwal, composed by Laxmikant–Pyarelal, Lyrics by Anand Bakshi
- "Maine bhi ek geet likha hai" from Hamara Khandan (1988), composed by Laxmikant–Pyarelal
- "Gori Hai Kalaiyan" from Aaj Ka Arjun (1990), composed by Bappi Lahiri
- "Sochna Kya Jo bhi" from Ghayal (1990) (with Kumar Sanu and Asha Bhosle), composed by Bappi Lahiri
- "O Radha Tere Bina" from Radha Ka Sangam (1992), composed by Anu Malik
- "Tu Pagal Premi Awara" from Shola aur Shabnam (1992), composed by Bappi Lahiri
- "Finak habibi finak" from Awara Paagal Deewana (2002) composed by Anu Malik
- "I Don't Know What to do" from Housefull (2010) composed by Shankar–Ehsaan–Loy.
