= Tiku Talsania =

Indian actor (born 1954)

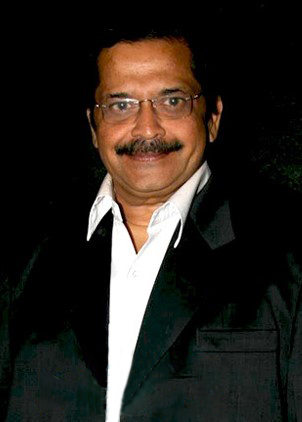
- Talsania in 2013
- Born: 7 June 1954 (age 72); Bombay, Bombay State, India
- Occupation: Actor
- Years active: 1976–present
- Works: Full list
- Height: 168 cm (5 ft 6 in)
- Spouse: Deepti Talsania
- Children: 2

Tiku Talsania (born 7 June 1954) is an Indian actor, known for his work in Hindi films. He is primarily known for his comic roles in popular comedy films. Apart from acting in films and television serials, Talsania also performed as a freelance theatre artist, actively participating in Gujarati theatre productions.

== Career ==
=== Television ===
Tiku has acted in numerous television serials, beginning with Yeh Jo Hai Zindagi in 1984. He later appeared in popular TV shows of the 80s and 90s such as Fikr Ne Kaha, Yeh Duniyan Gazab Ki, Zamana Badal Gaya, and Ek Se Badkar Ek.

He acted in many successful serials, including Uttaran. He was also seen in Sony SAB's sitcom Sajan Re Phir Jhooth Mat Bolo.

=== Films ===
Tiku started his Bollywood career with Rajeev Mehra's Pyaar Ke Do Pal in 1986. He continued to play his role as comedian in movies such as Dil Hai Ke Manta Nahin, Umar 55 Ki Dil Bachpan Ka, Bol Radha Bol, Andaz Apna Apna and Mr. Bechara from 1991 to 1996. Breaking from his comedian roles, he donned the cap of a serious character in the movie Waqt Hamara Hai in 1993.

He then acted in a number of commercially successful movies such as Ishq in 1997, Jodi No.1 in 2001 and up until Partner in 2007. He received critical acclaim for his role in Sanjay Leela Bhansali's Devdas. Tiku, who played the role of the protagonist Devdas's caretaker Dharamdas, said that he was confident that his role would get noticed.

Talsania continued to work in films such as Dhamaal and Special 26 with minor roles, as having primary focus on television serials.

== Personal life ==
Talsania married Deepti, with whom he has two children, a son, music composer Rohaan Talsania and a daughter, actress Shikha Talsania, who has acted in films like Veere Di Wedding, Coolie No. 1 and I Hate Luv Storys.

== See also ==
- Talsana, ancestral village of Talsania
