= Anand–Milind discography =

The below given is the list of films and albums worked by Anand–Milind as music director duo.

== 1980s ==
Year	Album	Notes
1984	Ab Ayega Mazaa	Debut film.
1986	Tan-Badan	
1986	Maa Beti	
1986	Peechha Karro	
1986	Andaaz Pyaar Ka	
1986	Shabash Sharon	pop album – Sharon Prabhakar
1986	Shararat	pop album – Sharon Prabhakar
1987	The Best Of Sharon Prabhakar	pop album
1987	Venella Raani	Telugu–language pop album
1987	Jalwa	
1988	Aurat Teri Yehi Kahani	
1988	Khoon Bahaa Ganga Mein	
1988	Shiv Shakti	
1988	Qayamat Se Qayamat Tak	Won– Filmfare Award for Best Music Director
1988	Woh Phir Aayegi	
1989	Abhi To Main Jawan Hoon	
1989	Lal Dupatta Malmal Ka	
1989	Phir Lehraya Lal Dupatta	
1989	Rakhwala	
1989	Anjaane Rishte	

== 1990s ==
Year	Album	Notes	Sales
1990	Maha–Sangram		
1990	Zahreelay		
1990	Taqdeer Ka Tamasha		
1990	Bandh Darwaza		
1990	Swarg		1,000,000
1990	Tum Mere Ho		
1990	Dil	Nominated – Filmfare Award for Best Music Director	2,000,000
1990	Jungle Love		
1990	Deewana Mujh Sa Nahin		
1990	Mera Pati Sirf Mera Hai		
1990	Kafan		
1990	Jawani Zindabad		
1990	Nyay Anyay		
1990	Baaghi: A Rebel for Love	Nominated – Filmfare Award for Best Music Director	1,500,000
1990	Yaadon Ke Mausam		
1990	Zakhmi Zameen		
1991	Lahu Luhan		
1991	Saugandh		
1991	Haque		
1991	Ayee Milan Ki Raat		
1991	Kurbaan		
1991	Prem Qaidi		
1991	Trinetra		
1991	Dancer		
1991	Jungle Queen		
1991	Love		
1991	Dastoor		
1992	Daulat Ki Jung		
1992	Yaad Rakhegi Duniya		
1992	Vansh		
1992	Mere Sajana Saath Nibhana		
1992	Suryavanshi		
1992	Adharm		
1992	Qaid Mein Hai Bulbul		
1992	Beta	Nominated – Filmfare Award for Best Music Director	3,000,000
1992	Mr. Bond		
1992	Ghazab Tamasha		
1992	Inteha Pyar Ki		
1992	Jaan Se Pyaara		
1992	Ek Ladka Ek Ladki		
1992	Jagruti		
1992	Honeymoon		
1992	Aaj Ka Goonda Raaj		1,500,000
1992	Parda Hai Parda		
1992	Deedar		
1992	Bol Radha Bol		2,200,000
1992	Sone Ki Lanka		
1992	Sone Ki Zanjeer		
1992	Main Hoon Sherni		
1992	Jigar		2,000,000
1992	Tilak		
1992	Sangeet		
1992	Baaz		
1992	Ghar Jamai		
1992	Abhi Abhi		
1992	Dil Aashna Hai		
1992	Sachcha Pyar		
1992	Pyar Hua Badnaam		
1993	Keyamat Theke Keyamat	Bangladeshi film	
1993	Game		
1993	Insaniyat Ka Devta		
1993	Hum Anaaree Hain		
1993	Anari		
1993	Lootere		2,200,000
1993	Platform		
1993	Hasti		
1993	Kayda Kanoon		
1993	Pardesi		
1993	Phool		
1993	Jeevan Ki Shatranj		
1993	Pehchaan		
1993	Chandra Mukhi		
1993	Santaan		
1993	Parwane		
1993	Baarish		
1993	Dhanwaan		
1993	Bhagyawan		
1993	Shatranj		
1994	Zamane Se Kya Darna		
1994	Raja Babu		1,800,000
1994	Milan		
1994	Madhosh		
1994	Mahakaal		
1994	Sholay Aur Toofan		
1994	Sangam Ho Ke Rahega		
1994	Laadla		1,500,000
1994	Betaaj Badshah		
1994	Maha Shaktishaali		
1994	Anjaam		
1994	Pehla Pehla Pyar		
1994	Jai Kishen		
1994	Anth		
1994	Krantiveer		
1994	Eena Meena Deeka		
1994	Udhaar Ki Zindagi		
1994	Suhaag		2,000,000
1994	Raat Ke Gunaah		
1994	Gopi Kishan		2,000,000
1994	Sangdil Sanam		
1994	Teesra Kaun		1,800,000
1994	Ab To Aaja Saajan Mere		
1995	Ab Insaf Hoga		
1995	Jai Vikraanta		
1995	Aazmayish		
1995	God and Gun		
1995	Taqdeerwala		
1995	Janam Kundli		
1995	Vapsi Saajan Ki		
1995	Kismat		
1995	Taaqat		
1995	Coolie No. 1		2,800,000
1995	Hum Dono		
1995	Jallaad		
1995	Angrakshak		
1995	Meri Mohabbat Mera Naseeba		
1996	Himmat		
1996	Ek Tha Raja		
1996	Dushmani: A Violent Love Story		
1996	Vijeta		
1996	Bandish		
1996	Bambai Ka Babu		
1996	Duniyaa Jhukti Hai		
1996	Jaan		
1996	Mafia		
1996	Loafer		
1996	Army		
1996	Muqaddar		
1996	Mr. Bechara		
1996	Daayraa		
1996	Daanveer		
1996	Chhote Sarkar		
1996	Rakshak		
1996	Ajay		
1996	Talaashi		
1997	Yeshwant		
1997	Hero No. 1		1,800,000
1997	Lahu Ke Do Rang		
1997	Mrityudaata		1,500,000
1997	Sanam		
1997	Zameer		
1997	Insaaf:The Final Justice		
1997	Suraj		
1997	Mrityudand		
1997	Mere Sapno Ki Rani		
1997	Udaan		
1997	Bhai		
1997	Qahar		
1997	Shapath		
1998	Sher–E–Hindustan		
1998	Banarasi Babu		
1998	2001: Do Hazaar Ek		
1998	Chandaal		
1998	Aunty No. 1		
1998	Dulhe Raja		2,000,000
1998	Yamraaj		
1998	Barood		
1998	Zanjeer		
1998	Sar Utha Ke Jiyo		
1998	Jhooth Bole Kauwa Kaate		
1999	Shera		
1999	Kaala Samrajya		
1999	Jaanam Samjha Karo	Only one song.	18,00,000
1999	Hogi Pyaar Ki Jeet		
1999	Rajaji		
1999	Sanyasi Mera Naam		
1999	Maa Kasam		
1999	Gair		
1999	Dillagi	Only one song.	
1999	Dahek	Only 2 song.	
1999	Jaanwar		2,000,000

== 2000s ==
Year	Album	Notes	Sales
2000	Shikaar		
2000	Krodh		
2000	Chal Mere Bhai		12,00,000
2000	Jwalamukhi		
2001	Zahreela		
2001	Chhupa Rustam		
2001	Yeh Teraa Ghar Yeh Meraa Ghar		
2002	Akhiyon Se Goli Maare	Anand–Milind shared credits with Anand Raj Anand, Daboo Malik and Dilip Sen–Sameer Sen	
2002	Jaani Dushman: Ek Anokhi Kahani	Anand–Milind shared credits with Anand Raj Anand and Sandeep Chowtha	
2002	Roshni		
2002	Mawali No.1		
2003	Miss India		
2003	Gupta vs Gordon	International project.	
2003	Idi Maa Ashokgadi Love Story	Telugu film.	
2004	Police Force	Also featured one song, Aai re mahi, composed by Satish–Ajay and rendered by Shreya Ghoshal.	
2004	Rakht	Only one song. other songs were composed by Anand Raj Anand, Shaan and Naresh Sharma.	
2004	Inteqam		
2004	Alibaba Aur 40 Chor		
2005	Naam Gum Jaayega		
2005	Khullam Khulla Pyaar Karen		
2005	Mastaani		
2005	Sauda - The Deal		
2006	Souten		
2006	Dhadkanein		
2006	Jaana - Let's Fall In Love		

== 2010s ==
Year	Album	Notes
2010	Idiot Box	
2011	Tum Hi To Ho	
2011	Zahreela	
2011	Tomaye Bhaalobashi	Bengali
2012	Murder	Bengali
2012	MAD	
2012	Yeh Khula Aasman	
2013	Nautanki Saala	Dhak Dhak from Beta was remixed and used.
2014	2 States	Saathiya Yeh Tune Kya Kiya from Love was recreated and used.
2015	All Is Well	Aye Mere Humsafar from Qayamat Se Qayamat Tak was recreated by Mithoon and used. The recreated version is sung by Mithoon and Tulsi Kumar. Additional lyrics are by Amitabh Verma
2017	Bulbul	Kya karte thay saajna from Lal Dupatta Malmal Ka was recreated by Meet Bros and used as Tere bin o sajna. No credit to Anand–Milind has been given in this new version.
2018	Dil Juunglee	Gazab Ka Hain Din from Qayamat Se Qayamat Tak was recreated by Tanishk Bagchi.
2018	Patil (Marathi Film)	One song Dhin Tak Dhin sung by Babul Supriyo and Shreya Ghoshal
2019	Khandaani Shafakhana	Shehar ki Ladki from Rakshak was recreated by Tanishk Bagchi.
2019	Pati Patni Aur Woh	Ankhiyon se Goli Maare from Dulhe Raja was recreated. This song was recreated twice– by Tanishk Bagchi and Lijo George – DJ Chetas.

== 2020s ==
Year	Album	Notes
2020	Shubh Mangal Zyada Saavdhan	Kya Karte Thay Sajna from Laal Dupatta Malmal Ka (1987) was recreated by Tanishk Bagchi and written by Vayu. The song had additional vocals by Zara Khan.
2020	Times of Music	A musical reality show where music composers pair up and recreate each other's songs. Anand–Milind are paired with Sajid–Wajid.
2020	Coolie No. 1	Main Toh Raste Se Jaa Raha Tha and Husn Hai Suhana from Coolie No. 1 (1995) will be recreated.
2022	Dheere Dheere Raffta Raffta	An original studio album for music director, Himesh Reshammiya's second music label.
