= Chinni Prakash =

Indian choreographer

- Born: Chinni Prakash
- Other names: Chinni, Chinni Prakash, Chinni Lal
- Occupations: Choreographer, Film director, Actor, Art director, Script-writer
- Spouse: Rekha Chinni Prakash
- Mother: C.Leela

Chinni Prakash is an Indian film choreographer, art director, actor, script-writer, director. He is best known for his choreographic work in numerous Hindi films. Chinni Prakash is the acclaimed choreographer of Kannada, Telugu and Hindi films.

== Personal life ==
From his childhood Chinni Prakash always wanted to make it big in Hindi films. After finishing his studies, he came to Bombay and with time, he started working as an assistant to many choreographers.

Chinni Prakash is married to Rekha Chinni Prakash who also is a choreographer and they work together.

== Career ==
Chinni Prakash got his first stint as a full-fledged choreographer was for film Khandan. He made a pair with choreographer Sampath and choreographed songs for many big films like Ram Aur Shyam (1967), Sadhu Aur Shaitaan (1968), and Haathi Mere Saathi (1971). However, after Sabse Bada Rupaiya (1976), Chinni Prakash disappeared completely. Chinni Prakash came back to Hindi films as a solo choreographer with Hero Hiralal (1988). His dances for "Bambai Humko Jam Gayi" (Swarg) became very popular but it was his choreography for the song "Jumma Chumma" from movie Hum that did the trick for him. Chinni Prakash suddenly became one of the most sought-after choreographers of Hindi cinema.

Chinni Prakash then was a part of many big films in the early 1990s like Saajan (1991), Khuda Gawah (1992) and Gumrah (1993). Later, he particularly became a favourite with Akshay Kumar and gave him many hit dance moves in films like Khiladi (1992), Mohra (1994), Main Khiladi Tu Anari (1994), Sabse Bada Khiladi (1995), Khiladiyon Ka Khiladi (1996) and Keemat (1998). He was also a hit with Govinda and did his dances in Coolie No. 1 (1995), Gambler (1995) and Bade Miyan Chote Miyan (1998).

Karan Arjun (1995) and Gupt (1997) have two of his most famous dance numbers. With the coming of the 21st century, Chinni Prakash's work started getting lesser as his dances were not in sync with the requirement of the contemporary Hindi films. Although his choreography in Dhadkan (2000) and Jodi No.1 (2001) was appreciated, he was not certainly as popular and in demand as earlier.

Chinni Prakash has won the National Award and Filmfare Best Choreographer award both for his work.

His wife is the well known choreographer Rekha Chinni Prakash. He also trained his niece Vaibhavi Merchant, who gave us the moves in "Kajra Re", among many other filmi songs. He is known for his talent of controlling huge crowds of background dancers in extreme conditions.

== Filmography ==
Year	Title	Actor	Art Director	Director	Script Writer	Notes
1978	Samayamaayilla Polum	Yes			Yes	Malayalam
1978	Azhage Unnai Aarathikkiren	Yes				Tamil, Telugu, Kannada
1981	Mohana Punnagai	Yes				Tamil
1981	Then Chittugal	Yes				Tamil
1986	December 16					Kannada
1997	Ghoonghat			Yes	Yes	Tamil
2004	Shart: The Challenge		Yes			Hindi

=== As choreographer ===
- Note: this is a partial list.

Year	Films	Language
1962	Rakhi	Hindi
1964	Khandan	Hindi
1967	Ram Aur Shyam	Hindi
1967	Chitra Mela	Hindi
1967	Arasa Kattalai	Tamil
1968	Sadhu Aur Shaitaan	Hindi
1968	Gauri	Hindi
1968	Aadmi	Hindi
1970	Jawab	Hindi
1971	Haathi Mere Saathi	Hindi
1972	Maalik	Hindi
1973	Keemat	Hindi
1974	Do Phool	Hindi
1976	Sabse Bada Rupaiya	Hindi
1988	Hatya	Hindi
1988	Hero Hiralal	Hindi
1989	Na-Insaafi	Hindi
1989	Aag Se Khelenge	Hindi
1989	Shehzaade	Hindi
1989	Ladaai	Hindi
1990	Swarg	Hindi
1990	Doodh Ka Karz	Hindi
1990	Nyay Anyay	Hindi
1990	Thanedaar	Hindi
1990	Sheshnaag	Hindi
1990	Jeene Do	Hindi
1990	Jawani Zindabad	Hindi
1991	Hum	Hindi
1991	Patthar Ke Phool	Hindi
1991	Police Matthu Dada	Kannada
1991	Inspector Dhanush	Hindi
1991	Yodha	Hindi
1991	Ki Heba Sua Posile	Hindi
1991	Gunehgar Kaun	Hindi
1991	Paap Ki Aandhi	Hindi
1991	100 Days	Hindi
1991	Benaam Badsha	Hindi
1991	Afsana Pyar Ka	Hindi
1991	Trinetra	Hindi
1991	Saajan	Hindi
1991	Akayla	Hindi
1991	Lakshmanrekha	Hindi
1992	Khiladi	Hindi
1992	Meera Ka Mohan	Hindi
1992	Appula Appa Rao	Telugu
1992	Yaad Rakhegi Duniya	Hindi
1992	Heer Ranjha	Hindi
1992	Kal Ki Awaz	Hindi
1992	Khuda Gawah	Hindi
1992	Angaar	Hindi
1992	Jigar	Hindi
1992	Apradhi	Hindi
1993	Ashaant	Hindi
1993	King Uncle	Hindi
1993	Roop Ki Rani Choron Ka Raja	Hindi
1993	Prateeksha	Hindi
1993	Krishan Avtaar	Hindi
1993	Waqt Hamara Hai	Hindi
1993	Khal-Naaikaa	Hindi
1993	Gumrah	Hindi
1993	Dalaal	Hindi
1993	Aulad Ke Dushman	Hindi
1993	Chandramukhi	Hindi
1994	Kranti Kshetra	Hindi
1994	Aa Gale Lag Jaa	Hindi
1994	Sangdil Sanam	Hindi
1994	Zaalim	Hindi
1994	Ikke Pe Ikka	Hindi
1994	Amaanat	Hindi
1994	Main Khiladi Tu Anari	Hindi
1994	Chaand Kaa Tukdaa	Hindi
1994	Vijaypath	Hindi
1994	Mohra	Hindi
1994	Dilwale	Hindi
1995	Gambler	Hindi
1995	Ravan Raaj: A True Story	Hindi
1995	Sarhad: The Border of Crime	Hindi
1995	Sabse Bada Khiladi	Hindi
1995	Prem	Hindi
1995	The Don	Hindi
1995	God and Gun	Hindi
1995	Coolie No. 1	Hindi
1995	Andolan	Hindi
1995	Karan Arjun	Hindi
1995	Takkar	Hindi
1996	Ek Tha Raja	Hindi
1996	Mafia	Hindi
1996	Rakshak	Hindi
1996	Sapoot	Hindi
1996	Diljale	Hindi
1996	Jeet	Hindi
1996	Krishna	Hindi
1996	Maahir	Hindi
1996	Daraar	Hindi
1996	Khiladiyon Ka Khiladi	Hindi
1996	Jung	Hindi
1997	Ghulam-E-Musthafa	Hindi
1997	Gupt	Hindi
1997	Sanam	Hindi
1997	Qahar	Hindi
1997	Daava	Hindi
1997	Mrityudaata	Hindi
1997	Insaaf	Hindi
1997	Ziddi	Hindi
1997	Lahoo Ke Do Rang	Hindi
1998	Jhooth Bole Kauwa Kaate	Hindi
1998	Bade Miyan Chote Miyan	Hindi
1998	Pyaar Koi Khel Nahin	Hindi
1998	Dulhe Raja	Hindi
1998	Major Saab	Hindi
1998	Humse Badhkar Kaun	Hindi
1998	Salaakhen	Hindi
1998	Keemat – They Are Back	Hindi
1999	Rajaji	Hindi
1999	Thakshak	Hindi
1999	Gair	Hindi
1999	Sooryavansham	Hindi
1999	Jai Hind	Hindi
1999	Zulmi	Hindi
1999	Aarzoo	Hindi
1999	Bade Dilwala	Hindi
1999	Hum Aapke Dil Mein Rehte Hain	Hindi
2000	Krodh	Hindi
2000	Beti No. 1	Hindi
2000	Mechanic Mamaiah	Telugu
2000	Aaghaaz	Hindi
2000	Karobaar: The Business of Love	Hindi
2000	Hamara Dil Aapke Paas Hai	Hindi
2000	Dhadkan	Hindi
2000	Hum To Mohabbat Karega	Hindi
2000	Hadh Kar Di Aapne	Hindi
2000	Baaghi	Hindi
2000	Badal	Hindi
2000	Bulandi	Hindi
2001	Kasam	Hindi
2001	Ittefaq	Hindi
2001	Jodi No.1	Hindi
2001	Chori Chori Chupke Chupke	Hindi
2002	Kitne Door Kitne Paas	Hindi
2002	Pitaah	Hindi
2003	Tere Naam	Hindi
2003	Khanjar: The Knife	Hindi
2003	Tujhe Meri Kasam	Hindi
2004	Shankar Dada MBBS	Telugu
2004	Dobara	Hindi
2004	Meri Biwi Ka Jawab Nahin	Hindi
2004	Surya	Bengali
2004	Suno Sasurjee	Hindi
2005	Idhaya Thirudan	Tamil
2005	Sandakozhi	Tamil
2005	Anjaane: The Unknown	Hindi
2005	Jai Chiranjeeva	Telugu
2006	Bhoot Unkle	Hindi
2007	Victoria No. 203	Hindi
2008	Jodhaa Akbar	Hindi
2008	Yuvvraaj	Hindi
2010	Golmaal 3	Hindi
2010	Dabangg	Hindi
2011	I Am Singh	Hindi
2012	Dabangg 2	Hindi
2012	Bol Bachchan	Hindi
2012	Teri Meri Kahaani	Hindi
2012	Jaanu	Hindi
2012	Kadhalil Sodhappuvadhu Yeppadi	Tamil
2012	Agneepath	Hindi
2013	Singh Saab the Great	Hindi
2013	Krrish 3	Hindi
2013	Chennai Express	Hindi
2013	Besharam	Hindi
2013	Grand Masti	Hindi
2013	Himmatwala	Hindi
2013	Zamaanat	Hindi
2013	Thalaivaa	Hindi
2014	Humpty Sharma Ki Dulhania	Hindi
2014	Singham Returns	Hindi
2014	Daawat-e-Ishq	Hindi
2015	Dum Laga Ke Haisha	Hindi
2017	Buddies in India	Mandarin

== Awards ==
Chinni Prakash got National Film Award for Best Choreography 2008 for the song, "Azeem-O-Shaan Shahenshah" movie Jodha Akbar.

Chinni Prakash has won the Filmfare Best Choreographer award 1992 for 'Jumma Chumma De De' (Hum), in 1995 for ‘Tu cheez badi hai mast mast’ (Mohra), and in 1997 ‘Shehar Ki Ladki’ (Rakshak) respectively.

He also received the Tamil Nadu State Film Award for Best Choreographer for the movie Thavasi in 2001.
