= Jaane Jigar =

- Directed by: Arshad Khan
- Written by: Lalit Mahajan
- Produced by: B. R. Sahni
- Starring: Jackie Shroff; Mohnish Bahl; Ayub Khan; Manek Bedi; Mamta Kulkarni
- Cinematography: Anil Dhanda
- Edited by: Prakash Dave
- Music by: Rajesh Roshan
- Release date: 1 February 1998
- Running time: 143 min.
- Country: India
- Language: Hindi
- Budget: ₹ 1,25,00,000
- Box office: ₹ 71,75,000 (Disaster)

Jaane Jigar is a 1998 Indian Bollywood action film directed by Arshad Khan and produced by B.R. Sahni. The film stars Jackie Shroff, Mohnish Bahl and Mamta Kulkarni.

== Plot ==
This is the story of Meena and Meenu who come from different families but look the same. Meena loves Ravi and Meenu fall in love with Vijay.

== Cast ==
- Jackie Shroff as Jaikishan
- Mohnish Bahl as Monty
- Mamta Kulkarni as Meenu / Meena
- Ayub Khan as Ravi Kumar
- Manek Bedi as Vijay
- Kader Khan as Ghanshyam
- Rita Bhaduri as Mrs. Prem Kishan
- Tiku Talsania as Ghanshyam's friend
- Yunus Parvez as Seth Babu Singh
- Vikas Anand as Prem Kishan
- Kunickaa Sadanand as Lady in the Beach
- Puneet Issar as Rana

== Soundtrack ==
Song	Singer
"Nainon Se Mila Jo Naina"	Chandana Dixit, Abhijeet
"Naaraaz Kyun Ho"	Abhijeet, Alka Yagnik
"Laun Kahan Se"	Abhijeet, Poornima
"Bhangra Pao Aaya"	Bali Brahmabhatt, Lalit Sen
"Chahanewale Aaj Milte Hai"	Kavita Krishnamurthy, Kumar Sanu
"Sau Barson Tak"	Kumar Sanu
