= Samrat Mukherjee =

Indian actor

Samrat Mukerji
- Born: 29 May 1970 (age 56); India
- Other names: Samrat Mukherji; Samrat Mukherjee
- Occupation: Actor
- Years active: 1996–present
- Height: 5 ft 11 in (180 cm)
- Relatives: Sashadhar Mukherjee (grandfather)

Samrat Mukerji (born 29 May 1970) is an Indian actor who appears in Hindi and Bengali cinema and soap operas.

== Family background ==
Samrat Mukerji is part of the Mukherjee-Samarth family clan of Bollywood. His paternal grandfather, Sashadhar Mukherjee, was a filmmaker and co-founder of Filmalaya Studios in Amboli, Mumbai. His sister is Sharbani Mukherjee His cousins are actresses Kajol, Rani Mukerji and Tanisha and director Ayan Mukerji.

== Career ==
Samrat debuted in the film Ram Aur Shyam with Manek Bedi. The following year he played the role of Akbar in Bhai Bhai (1997) directed by Sikander Bharti. He appeared in the role of Kavita in the Hindi film Zanjeer (1998) alongside Aditya Pancholi and again with Monica Bedi in the film Sikandar Sadak Ka (1999) as well as various other Bengali and Hindi films. In 2005 he played the role of Bijju in Vishal Bhardwaj's film The Blue Umbrella. His more recent credit includes his acclaimed role as freedom fighter, Ganesh Ghosh in Ashutosh Gowariker's film Khelein Hum Jee Jaan Sey (2010) where he appeared alongside Deepika Padukone, Abhishek Bachchan, Sikander Kher and Vishakha Singh.

== Filmography ==
=== Hindi ===
Year	Film	Role	Notes
1996	Ram Aur Shyam	Ram	Debut film
1997	Bhai Bhai	Akbar	
1998	Zanjeer	Sudhakar	
1999	Sikandar Sadak Ka	Balram	
1999	Sar Ankhon Par		
2002	Sabse Badkar Hum	Devaa	
2005	Aankhon Mein Sapne Liye		
2007	The Blue Umbrella	Bijju	
2010	Khelein Hum Jee Jaan Sey	Ganesh Ghosh	
2013	Hum Hai Raahi Car Ke	John	
