= Bhai Bhai (1997 film) =

1997Hindi action film

- Directed by: Sikander Bharti
- Written by: Janak-Hriday
- Produced by: Pahlaj Nihalani
- Starring: Manek Bedi; Samrat Mukherjee; Ritu Shivpuri; Megha
- Cinematography: Siba Mishra
- Edited by: Nandkumar
- Music by: Songs: Aadesh Srivastava; Score: Surinder Sodhi
- Production company: Vishal Enterprises
- Release date: 14 November 1997
- Running time: 172 minutes
- Country: India
- Language: Hindi

Bhai Bhai (translation: Brother Brother) is a 1997 Hindi-language action film directed by Sikander Bharti and produced by Pahlaj Nihalani.

== Plot ==
Mafia don Jagraj wants to destroy the peace of India and capture Kashmir. He sends his right hand Goga to spread communal violence all over the country. The henchmen incite riots between Hindus and Muslims. Raghu is one of them, but in this course of action, his child gets killed. Ex-freedom fighter Haji Sahib prays to the communities to stop the bloody riot and finally succeeds. Broken-hearted, Raghu comes to Haji and informs that riots were pre-planned, Haji's close associate Mahadev is involved with mastermind Mafia Jagraj. Initially, Haji does not believe it, but Raghu hands over a secret file to him before committing suicide. Haji challenges Mahadev about his works. While he tries to make Mahadev confess, Goga kills Haji. Now Goga deputes two friends, namely Veeru and Akbar to find that secret file.

== Cast ==
- Manek Bedi as Veeru
- Samrat Mukherjee as Akbar
- Ritu Shivpuri as Phoolwa
- Megha as Anita Verma
- Prem Chopra as SP Natwarlal Verma
- Shakti Kapoor as Goga
- Gulshan Grover as Jagraj
- Sharat Saxena as Janardan
- Mac Mohan as Raghu
- Sudhir as Dr. Jaichand
- Ishrat Ali as Military Officer Lambu Atta
- Akshaye Khanna as Dancer in the song "Halloo Halloo" (special appearance)

== Soundtrack ==
1. "Woh Desh Hamara Hai" - Kumar Sanu, Alka Yagnik, Udit Narayan, Sapna Mukherjee
2. "Chand Nikla" - Kumar Sanu, Alka Yagnik, Sudesh Bhosle
3. "Dil Dil Dil Dil" - Kumar Sanu, Alka Yagnik
4. "Zindagi Ab Shuru" - Kumar Sanu
5. "Yeh Mausam Hai Rang Biranga" - Sudesh Bhosle, Alka Yagnik
6. "Halloo Halloo" - Kavita Krishnamurthy, Abhijeet
