= Bharat Rangachary =

Indian film director

Bharat Rungachary
- Born: 1 May 1953; Bombay, India
- Died: 4 July 1995 (aged 42)
- Occupations: Director, screenwriter
- Years active: 1977–1995
- Spouse: Kalpana Rungachary

Bharat Rangachary (May 1, 1953 - July 4, 1995) was an Indian film director and producer of Bollywood. He has directed several successful films like Zameen Aasmaan, Baat Ban Jaye, Waqt Hamara Hai and Takkar. He died on 4 July 1995, in Bombay due to cancer. His last film Takkar was released shortly after his death. He started his career as an assistant director with acclaimed director Hrishikesh Mukherjee. He was also acclaimed for his direction of TV series Subah on Doordarshan.

== Selected filmography ==
- Zameen Aasmaan - 1984
- Baat Ban Jaye - 1986
- Khatarnaak - 1990
- Zulm Ki Hukumat - 1992
- Waqt Hamara Hai - 1993
- Hanste Khelte - 1994
- Takkar - 1995
