= Pooja Entertainment =

Indian film production company

- Type: Public
- Industry: Entertainment
- Founded: 1986
- Founder: Vashu Bhagnani
- Headquarters: Mumbai, Maharashtra, India
- Area served: Worldwide
- Key people: Vashu Bhagnani; Jackky Bhagnani; Deepshikha Deshmukh
- Products: Film production Film distribution
- Owner: Vashu Bhagnani
- Website: poojastudios.com

Pooja Entertainment is an Indian production and distribution company established by Vashu Bhagnani in 1986. It is based in Mumbai, Maharashtra, India. The company is known for producing the comedies: Coolie No. 1 (1995), Hero No. 1 (1997), and Biwi No.1 (1999). It has produced over 40 films as of 2024.

== History ==
Pooja Entertainment was founded as Pooja Films by Vashu Bhagnani in 1986.

== Filmography ==
| † | Denotes films that have not yet been released |

| Year | Title | Produced | Ref. |
|---|---|---|---|
| 1995 | Coolie No. 1 | Yes | |
| 1997 | Hero No. 1 | Yes | |
| 1998 | Pyaar Kiya To Darna Kya | Yes | |
| 1998 | Bade Miyan Chote Miyan | Yes | |
| 1999 | Biwi No.1 | Yes | |
| 2000 | Tera Jadoo Chal Gayaa | Yes | |
| 2001 | Mujhe Kucch Kehna Hai | Yes | |
| 2001 | Rehnaa Hai Terre Dil Mein | Yes | |
| 2001 | Deewaanapan | Yes | |
| 2002 | Om Jai Jagadish | Yes | |
| 2002 | Jeena Sirf Merre Liye | Yes | |
| 2003 | Out of Control | Yes | |
| 2005 | Vaada | Yes | |
| 2005 | Silsiilay | Yes | |
| 2005 | Shaadi No. 1 | Yes | |
| 2009 | Kal Kissne Dekha | Yes | |
| 2009 | Do Knot Disturb | Yes | |
| 2011 | F.A.L.T.U | Yes | |
| 2012 | Ajab Gazabb Love | Yes | |
| 2013 | Himmatwala | Yes | |
| 2013 | Rangrezz | Yes | |
| 2014 | Humshakals | Yes | |
| 2014 | Youngistaan | Yes | |
| 2015 | Welcome 2 Karachi | Yes | |
| 2015 | Kis Kisko Pyaar Karoon | No | |
| 2016 | Sarbjit | Yes | |
| 2016 | Junooniyat | No | |
| 2016 | The Legend of Tarzan | No | |
| 2016 | Star Trek: Beyond | No | |
| 2016 | Madaari | No | |
| 2016 | Dishoom | No | |
| 2016 | Freaky Ali | No | |
| 2016 | Raaz: Reboot | No | |
| 2016 | Banjo | No | |
| 2016 | Tutak Tutak Tutiya | No | |
| 2017 | Sarvann | Yes | |
| 2017 | Carbon | Yes | |
| 2018 | Welcome To New York | Yes | |
| 2018 | Pari | No | |
| 2018 | Dil Juunglee | Yes | |
| 2018 | Parmanu: The Story of Pokhran | No | |
| 2019 | Khamoshi | Yes | |
| 2019 | Ghost | Yes | |
| 2020 | Jawaani Jaaneman | Yes | |
| 2020 | Coolie No. 1 | Yes | |
| 2021 | Bell Bottom | Yes | |
| 2021 | Shava Ni Girdhari Lal | Yes | |
| 2022 | Cuttputlli | Yes | |
| 2023 | Mission Raniganj | Yes | |
| 2023 | Ganapath | Yes | |
| 2024 | Bade Miyan Chote Miyan | Yes | |
| 2025 | Mere Husband Ki Biwi | Yes | |
