= Zanjeer (1998 film) =

Zanjeer: The Chain
- Directed by: Shibu Mitra
- Written by: Z. Onkar
- Produced by: Yusuf Butt
- Starring: Aditya Pancholi; Sakshi Shivanand
- Edited by: Bibhuti Bhushan
- Music by: Anand Milind
- Distributed by: Samna International
- Release date: 28 August 1998
- Running time: 135 minutes
- Country: India
- Language: Hindi

Zanjeer: The Chain is a 1998 Bollywood action film directed by Shibu Mitra starring Aditya Pancholi, Pratibha Sinha and Shakti Kapoor in the lead role.

== Plot ==
The film follows the story of Kumar (Aditya Pancholi), a local underworld don of Mumbai, who has a rival Lala Sarweshwar (Kiran Kumar). Both men have occupied their own areas in Mumbai and are running their own businesses. Kumar wants to avenge the death of his father, who had been Lala's loyal friend but Lala got him murdered on doubts of treachery. Kumar has a younger brother Sudhakar (Samrat Mukerji), who hates him because of his criminal activities, unbeknownst to the fact that Kumar committed his first murder to protect Sudhakar.

== Cast ==
- Aditya Pancholi as Kumar
- Manek Bedi as Ajay
- Samrat Mukerji as Sudhakar
- Pratibha Sinha as Saroj
- Sakshi Shivanand as Kavita
- Kiran Kumar as Lala Sarweshwar
- Shakti Kapoor as Pratap
- Tej Sapru as Black Cap Akash
- Virendra Razdan as RN Shinde
- Akashdeep as Kamble

== Soundtrack ==
Zanjeer

Studio album by Anand–Milind
- Length: Mercia

#	Title	Singer(s)
1	"Tujhe Dekh Ke Pehli Baar"	Udit Narayan, Alka Yagnik
2	"Don't Touch My Ghaghariya"	Vinod Rathod, Alka Yagnik
3	"Kudi Punjabi"	Jaspinder Narula
4	"Main Hoon Dehradun Ka Tota"	Abhijeet, Alka Yagnik
5	"Chahe Din Ho Chahe Raat Ho"	Udit Narayan, Sadhana Sargam
