= Zameen Aasmaan (1984 film) =

Zameen Aasman
- Directed by: Bharat Rangachary
- Written by: Preeti Sapru (story); Rahi Masoom Reza (dialogues); Sachin Bhowmik (screenplay)
- Produced by: Uday Narayan Singh; Subhash Gupta
- Starring: Shashi Kapoor; Raakhee; Rekha; Sanjay Dutt; Anita Raj
- Cinematography: Shashi Kabre
- Music by: R. D. Burman
- Production company: Film Group
- Release date: 1 June 1984
- Country: India
- Language: Hindi

Zameen Aasman (transl. The Earth and the Sky) is a 1984 Indian film directed by Bharat Rangachary and produced by Uday Narayan Singh and Subhash Gupta. The movie stars Sanjay Dutt and Anita Raj.

== Plot ==
A widower has a run of good luck; a sudden increase in his fortunes, and a new woman in his life whose resemblance to his late wife seals the deal. However, the new bride may not have the best intentions towards him.

== Cast ==
- Shashi Kapoor as Dr. Kailash
- Rakhee Gulzar as Kavita
- Rekha as Dr. Kanchan
- Sanjay Dutt as Sanjay
- Anita Raj as Anita
- Mazhar Khan as Rakesh
- Satyendra Kapoor as Doctor
- Kalpana Iyer as Dancer

== Soundtrack ==
All tracks were composed by R.D. Burman. Lyrics were written by Anjaan.

Song	Singer
"Zameen Aasman"	Lata Mangeshkar
"Aisa Sama Na Hota"	Lata Mangeshkar
"Maine Dil Diya Ghabrake O Saathiya"	Lata Mangeshkar, Kishore Kumar
"Maano Ya Na Maano"	Kishore Kumar
"Pyar Naghma Hai, Pyar Sargam Hai"	Asha Bhosle, R. D. Burman

== See also ==
Surprisingly, the plot of this film is similar to the Raj Khosla directed film Sunny, which stars Sunny Deol and Amrita Singh. Both films, released in 1984, had Rahi Masoom Raza as the dialogue writer and R.D. Burman as the music composer.
