= Dand Nayak =

Dand-Nayak
- Directed by: Sikandar Bharti
- Written by: Madan Joshi (dialogues)
- Screenplay by: Dharamveer Ram
- Story by: Pritam Parkash Bali
- Produced by: Sanjay Bali; Lokesh Bali
- Starring: Naseeruddin Shah; Manek Bedi; Inder Kumar
- Cinematography: Anil Dhanda
- Edited by: Nand Kumar
- Music by: Rajesh Roshan
- Production company: Mateswari Films
- Release date: 17 April 1998
- Running time: 149 min.
- Country: India
- Language: Hindi

Dand-Nayak is a 1998 Bollywood action drama film directed by Sikandar Bharti. The film stars Naseeruddin Shah, Manek Bedi, Inder Kumar, Shilpa Shirodkar, Ayesha Jhulka, Priya Arora and Paresh Rawal.

== Plot ==
Bankelal Chaurasia comes to Bombay from Uttar Pradesh and starts a buffalo rearing business. He then advances into petty crime and works his way up to major crimes, such as dealing drugs, land grabbing, smuggling and murder. He soon becomes the Bombay underworld as the kingpin. ACP Vishal Chaudhary want to punish Bankelal by hook or by crook, and he also has a reputation in succeeding no matter what the consequences are. A lady journalist who always prints Bankelal's underworld dealings is also threatened and happens to be Inspector Vishal's wife Asha.

== Cast ==
- Naseeruddin Shah as ACP Vishal Chaudhary "Dand-Nayak"
- Manek Bedi as Suraj
- Inder Kumar as Karan
- Shilpa Shirodkar as Asha Chaudhary
- Ayesha Jhulka as Naina
- Priya Arora as Priya
- Paresh Rawal as Bankelal Chaurasia / Bhaiyaji
- Satyen Kappu as College Principal Ahluwalia
- Arun Bali as Police Commissioner Bakshi

== Soundtrack ==
Dand Nayak

Soundtrack album by Rajesh Roshan
- Genre: Feature film soundtrack
- Label: Time Audio

Lyrics were penned by Anand Bakshi.

Track#	Song title	Singer(s)
1	"Bahut Dur Jane Ko Dil Chahta Hai"	Sonu Nigam, Sadhana Sargam
2	"Happy Birthday To You"	Sonu Nigam, Alka Yagnik
3	"Aa Piya Aa Piya Meri Gali Aaja"	Udit Narayan, Asha Bhosle
4	"Memsab Dil Mera Dhadke" (Memsab)	Kumar Sanu
5	"Tera Bhi Ye Haal Huya"	Kumar Sanu, Alka Yagnik
6	"Ek Sau Do Ek Sau Teen"	Alka Yagnik, Vinod Rathod
