= Chandana Dixit =

Indian singer

- Education: SNDT University
- Occupation: Singer
- Years active: 1995–present
- Organization: Swarangan School of Music
- Known for: Coolie no. 1
- Notable work: Shehar Ki Ladki
- Website: chandanadixit.com

Chandana Dixit is a Bollywood playback singer who is famous for singing the "Husn Hain Suhana" song in the 1995 Hindi film, Coolie No. 1 starring Govinda and Karishma Kapoor.

Her other popular song is "Shehar Ki Ladki" from 1996 movie Rakshak. She also recorded the title track of the television series Shagun which aired on Star Plus in the afternoon slot.

Dixit moved to the U.S. state of Washington with her husband in 2002. She opened "Swarangan School of Music" there and teaches classical music.

== Discography ==
=== Film ===
Year	Films	Songs	Co-singer(s)	Notes	Ref.
1995	Coolie No. 1	"Husn Hai Suhana"	Abhijeet		
1996	Rakshak	"Shehar Ki Ladki"	Abhijeet		
1996	Daanveer	"Chumma Chumma"	Abhijeet		
1997	Bhai	"Khul Gaya Naseeb"	Abhijeet, Aditya Narayan		
1997	Auzaar	"Tujhe Khas Fursat Mein"	Kumar Sanu, Udit Narayan		
1997	Purani Kabar	"Dil Mein Churaya Ek Hasina"	Zubeen Garg		
1998	Sar Utha Ke Jiyo	"Meri Zindagi Meri Jaan" version 2	Sonu Nigam, Suresh Wadkar		
1998	Jaane Jigar	"Nainon Se Mila Jo Naina"	Abhijeet		
1999	Ravoyi Chandamama	"Jane Tammana Tumse"	Jolly Mukherjee	Hindi dubbed songs in Telugu movie	
1999	Ravoyi Chandamama	"Pyar Ho Gaya Hai Hume"	Vinod Rathod	Hindi dubbed songs in Telugu movie	
1999	Ravoyi Chandamama	"Seene Se Laga Le Mujkho"	Abhijeet	Hindi dubbed songs in Telugu movie	
1999	Ravoyi Chandamama	"Tum Mile Ho Mujhe"	Abhijeet	Hindi dubbed songs in Telugu movie	
2001	Baghaawat – Ek Jung	"Mera Dil Ullu Da Pattha"	Mohammed Aziz		
2003	Aanch	"Sada Suhagan"	Anuradha Paudwal		
2019	Khandaani Shafakhana	"Shehar Ki Ladki"	Badshah, Tulsi Kumar, Abhijeet		
2020	Coolie No. 1	"Husn Hai Suhana" New	Abhijeet		
