= Khatarnaak =

- Promotional Poster
- Directed by: Bharat Rangachary
- Produced by: Raam Shetty
- Starring: Sanjay Dutt; Farah; Anita Raj; Anupam Kher; Kiran Kumar
- Music by: Anu Malik
- Release date: 19 January 1990
- Country: India
- Language: Hindi

Khatarnaak is a 1990 Indian Hindi-language film directed by Bharat Rangachary. The film stars Sanjay Dutt, Farah, and Anita Raj in lead roles.

== Plot ==
Suraj (Sunjay Dutt), an orphan, enters the criminal world and becomes a gangster with the help of Dhabariya (Anupam Kher).

== Cast ==
- Sanjay Dutt as Suraj
- Farah as Dr. Sangeeta Joshi
- Anita Raj as Helena
- Anupam Kher as Dabariya
- Kiran Kumar as Jaunpuriya
- Govinda as Dancer / Singer
- Anil Dhawan

== Music ==
1. "Jeena Hai Hamka" - Amit Kumar, Govinda
2. "Aasman Pe Bahiti Chandni" - Abhijeet
3. "Mandir Mein Na Masjid Mein" - Sadhana Sargam
4. "Chori Chori Aaya Tu" - Alisha Chinai
5. "Zindagi Ne Pukara" - Asha Bhosle
