= Ram Aur Shyam (1996 film) =

- Directed by: Raju Mavani
- Written by: Anirudh Tiwari
- Produced by: Raju Mavani
- Starring: Samrat Mukherjee; Manek Bedi; Divya Dutta; Kanchan; Om Puri; Mukesh Rishi; Danny Denzongpa
- Cinematography: Sanjay Malvankar
- Edited by: A. Muthu
- Music by: Anu Malik
- Release date: 20 December 1996
- Running time: 129 min
- Country: India
- Language: Hindi
- Budget: ₹1.75 crore
- Box office: ₹2.6 crore

Ram Aur Shyam is a 1996 Hindi Action film of Bollywood directed and produced by Raju Mavani. It was released under the banner of Jay Raj Productions. This is the debut film of actors Samrat Mukherjee and Manek Bedi.

== Plot ==
Scientist Roshni Raman has discovered an important scientific formula. But she was abducted by the gang of "Jabar" and subsequently taken by force by "Tatar", another anti-national Don. Tatar is a very powerful person who has the police and politicians on his payroll. Roshni's mother could not be satisfied by the activities of the police and appoints a young fellow, "Ram", to locate and rescue Roshni. On the other hand, Jabar hires Shyam to find Roshni and bring her to him. Both men must now not only confront each other, but also the invincible Tatar.

== Cast ==
- Samrat Mukherjee as Ram
- Manek Bedi as Shyam
- Divya Dutta as Sunaina
- Kanchan as Ram's girlfriend
- Om Puri as DIG Suryapratap Thakur
- Tinnu Anand as Banjara Sardar
- Mukesh Rishi as Jabar
- Danny Denzongpa as Tatar
- Avtar Gill as Minister
- Rohini Hattangadi as Mrs. Raman
- Deepak Shirke as Bakhtawar

== Music ==
1. "Pyar Kis Se Karen" - Kumar Sanu
2. "Ek Nazar Dekha Tujhe" - Kumar Sanu, Alka Yagnik
3. "Ajab Ho Tum" - Kumar Sanu, Alka Yagnik
4. "Yaad Piya Ki Aaye" - Udit Narayan, Poornima
5. "Sajna Tere Bina" - Sadhana Sargam, Poornima
6. "Bindu Re Bindu" - Anu Malik, Parveen Saba
