= Baat Ban Jaye =

1986 Indian Hindi-language film

- Poster
- Directed by: Bharat Rangachary
- Produced by: Anil Hanspal; Nitin Manmohan
- Starring: Sanjeev Kumar; Mithun Chakraborty; Utpal Dutt; Raj Babbar; Amol Palekar; Zeenat Aman; Aruna Irani; Shakti Kapoor
- Music by: Kalyanji Anandji
- Release date: 14 March 1986 (India)
- Running time: 135 min.
- Language: Hindi

Baat Ban Jaye is a 1986 Indian Hindi-language film directed by Bharat Rangachary, starring Sanjeev Kumar, Mithun Chakraborty, Utpal Dutt, Raj Babbar, Zeenat Aman, Amol Palekar, Aruna Irani and Shakti Kapoor. This film is Inspired from the 1964 Hollywood film What a Way to Go!.

== Plot ==
Mr. Singh (Utpal Dutt) lives a wealthy lifestyle in a mansion named 'Ashiana' on 10th Road, Juhu, Bombay, with his only relative, a niece by the name of Nisha (Zeenat Aman), who is unmarried and runs the family's business that faces strong opposition from Khanna Group of Industries. Singh would like to see her marry but she hates wealthy men. So her uncle finds a poor man, Ajay Srivastav, but subsequently finds out that Ajay is already married and also has three daughters; then he decides to get Nisha married to a TV repairman, Yeshwant Bhosle, who ends up being a multi-millionaire after his invention is marketed; then he wants her to marry Viju Guide, a Hyderabad-based Tourist Guide, who finds buried treasure and also ends up a multi-millionaire; then he wants her to marry a motor mechanic, Prakash (Mithun Chakraborty), who, in turn, ends up being the only son of wealthy builder, Jayant Amar Nath, and ends up marrying his sweetheart and neighbor, Rosy. Finally Nisha meets her ideal match in Rukhtapur-based Suraj Singh (Sanjeev Kumar), a wedding singer/dancer, and marries him – not realizing that Suraj is not who he claims to be and she is merely a pawn in a charade that has been created especially to pull wool over her eyes.

== Cast ==
- Zeenat Aman as Nisha Singh
- Amol Palekar as Yashwant Rao Bhonsle
- Mithun Chakraborty as Prakash
- Utpal Dutt as Mr. Singh
- Raj Babbar as Vijay
- Sanjeev Kumar as Suraj Singh/Ravi Khanna
- Jalal Agha as Advocate Bharat Sinha
- Imtiaz Khan as Jayant Amar Nath
- Adi Irani as Ajay Srivastav
- Aruna Irani as Aruna Choudhary
- Jagdeep as Nagath Narayan
- Shakti Kapoor as Ashok Khanna/Ravi Khanna
- Sudhir as Molester
- Viju Khote as Dr. Dharmadhikari

== Soundtrack ==
All songs are written by Anand Bakshi. The soundtrack is available on Polydor/Music India Limited (now Universal Music India).

#	Title	Singer(s)
1	"Main Punjabi Hundustani"	Kishore Kumar
2	"Yahoo Mere Dil Mein"	Kishore Kumar, Alka Yagnik
3	"Ek Tha Bunjara"	Manhar Udhas
4	"Raja Tore Baag K"	Asha Bhosle
5	"Mera Roop Rang"	Sadhana Sargam
