= Sar Utha Ke Jiyo =

1998 Indian film by Sikander Bharti

- Poster
- Directed by: Sikander Bharti
- Written by: Anwar Khan
- Story by: Mohan Baggad
- Produced by: Monika Padwal
- Starring: Naseeruddin Shah; Madhoo; Manek Bedi; Raza Murad; Kiran Kumar; Gulshan Grover
- Cinematography: Akram Khan
- Edited by: Nand Kumar
- Music by: Anand–Milind
- Production company: P. M. Films
- Release date: 1998
- Running time: 142 min
- Country: India
- Language: Hindi
- Budget: ₹2.25 crore
- Box office: ₹3.13 crore

Sar Utha Ke Jiyo (transl. Keep Your Head High) is a 1998 Indian Hindi-language action film directed by Sikander Bharti, starring Naseeruddin Shah, Madhoo, Manek Bedi, Raza Murad, Kiran Kumar and Gulshan Grover.

== Cast ==
- Naseeruddin Shah as Inspector Vijay Khanna
- Madhoo as Meena
- Manek Bedi as Suraj Khanna
- Raza Murad as Police Commissioner Pawar
- Smita Jaykar as Mrs. Khanna
- Kiran Kumar as Gorakhnath
- Gulshan Grover as Virendra
- Laxmikant Berde as Lakhan Tripathi
- Mohan Joshi as Trikaal Singh
- Arjun as Nahar Singh
- Veeru Devgan as The Action Director
- Ajay Devgn as Vishal
- Salman Khan as Prem
- Sunil Shetty as Amar
- Umesh Mehra as Subhash
- Gracy Singh as Muskaan

== Soundtrack ==
1. "Baadal Garajane Laga Saawan Barasne Laga" - Udit Narayan, Anuradha Paudwal
2. "Darwaza Khula Tha" - Udit Narayan, Poornima
3. "Deewana Deewana" - Kumar Sanu, Sadhana Sargam
4. "Meri Zindagi Meri Jaan" - Sonu Nigam, Suresh Wadkar
5. "Meri Zindagi Meri Jaan v2" - Sonu Nigam, Suresh Wadkar, Chandana Dixit
6. "Mujhko Maar Gaya" - Mohammed Aziz
7. "Ya Allah Mujko Bacha" - Alka Yagnik, Abhijeet
