= Hanste Khelte (1994 film) =

- CD Cover
- Directed by: Bharat Rangachary
- Starring: Rahul Roy; Nandini Singh
- Music by: Jatin–Lalit
- Country of origin: India
- Original language: Hindi

Production
- Producer: Firoz Nadiadwala
- Budget: ₹5 million

Original release
- Network: Zee TV
- Release: 1 January 1994

Hanste Khelte is a 1994 Indian Hindi-language film directed by Bharat Rangachary and produced by Firoz Nadiadwala. It stars Rahul Roy, Nandini Singh (who made her debut with this film) in the lead roles, with Asrani, Rakesh Bedi, Anant Mahadevan and Ishrat Ali in another roles. Sudesh Bhosale gives his voice as a God in this film. The film aired on Zee TV in 1994.

== Cast ==
- Rahul Roy as Rahul Chopra
- Nandini Singh as Pooja Verma
- Lisa Ray as Rekha (Special appearance)
- Aparajita as Pooja's Maidservant
- Jagdeep as Pandu
- Rakesh Bedi as Om
- Asrani as Namah
- Anant Mahadevan as Shiva
- Dinesh Hingoo as Bhosle
- Satyajeet as Amit
- Ishrat Ali as Devil

== Soundtrack ==
Hanste Khelte

Soundtrack album by Jatin–Lalit
- Released: 1994
- Genre: Feature film soundtrack
- Producer: Jatin–Lalit

Song	Singer
"O Yaara, O Yaara"	Kumar Sanu
"O Meri Rekha"	Abhijeet
"Are Jaa Mujhe Na Sikha"	Abhijeet, Vijayeta Pandit
"Deewana Dil Kahe"	Suresh Wadkar, Sadhana Sargam
"Darwaza Kaahe Bandh Kiya"	Asha Bhosle, Sudesh Bhonsle
