= Takkar (1995 film) =

- Poster
- Directed by: Bharat Rangachary
- Screenplay by: Bhushan Banmali
- Produced by: Mahendra R. Bohra
- Starring: Naseeruddin Shah; Sunil Shetty; Sonali Bendre; Shafi Inamdar; Rakesh Bedi; Mohan Joshi
- Cinematography: Laxminarayan
- Edited by: R. Rajendran
- Music by: Anu Malik
- Production company: Bohra Bros.
- Distributed by: Meenakshi Pictures
- Release date: 14 July 1995
- Running time: 146 minutes
- Country: India
- Language: Hindi

Takkar (transl. Collision) is a 1995 Indian Hindi-language romantic thriller film directed by Bharat Rangachary, starring Sunil Shetty and Naseeruddin Shah. The film was released on 14 July 1995 and was a hit. It is inspired by the 1992 Hollywood film Unlawful Entry.

== Plot ==
Takkar revolves around the lives of three characters — Ravi Malhotra, Mohini and Inspector D'Costa. Ravi is a freelance photographer, in love with Mohini, who works hard to make a living so they can be together. Inspector D'Costa is an efficient but corrupt cop who takes advantage of criminals by helping them in return for money and then double crossing them; he pretends to be on the side of the law. No one is considered strong or wise enough to confront D'costa.

One day D'Costa notices Ravi and Mohini on the beach, and he falls for her. He frames Ravi on the day before his marriage to Mohini by falsely implicating him in a drug deal case in a fake raid. Ravi is sentenced to four years of imprisonment. In prison, Ravi decides to study the law so he can fight injustice and is helped by prisoners like Kaku who are in jail because of D'Costa and want to avenge themselves.

In Ravi's absence, D'Costa befriends Mohini and she begins to like and respect him. After two years, Ravi is released from jail on grounds of good behavior and on efforts by DCP Mishra made on Mohini's pleas. Soon Ravi and Mohini are married. D'Costa is infuriated and he harasses the couple repeatedly to get close to Mohini. Ravi soon learns that it was D'Costa who had framed him on the day before his marriage, and he decides to avenge himself. He follows D'Costa closely, and being a photographer, captures his activities on camera. DCP Mishra is killed by D'Costa when both of them rescue a group of school children from terrorists holding them captive in a school. This is noted by Ravi, and he makes it known publicly. D'Costa tries to eliminate Ravi but in vain. Soon an enquiry is arranged by the police (on Ravi's request), and Ravi plays the prosecution lawyer, wherein traps D'Costa in his own words, leading to his confession. He also provides evidence for the same.

The helpless D'Costa is now suspended from service and given orders not to go anywhere nearer than 500 feet of Ravi and Mohini. His mistress Maya tells the couple that he will never leave them in peace, but that his own desires can be used against him. Ravi leaves Mohini, pretending to go out of the city. D'Costa learns of this and immediately goes to the couple's house, where he is met by a surprise reception. Mohini dances with him, pretends to seduce him when abruptly Ravi breaks in, beats up D'Costa, police arrive and arrest the former cop. D'Costa is now jailed. In prison, he comes across the men whom he had jailed, who attack and kill him.

The film ends with D'Costa's burial, as Ravi sticks a cross with D'Costa's name on the grave. He then says "Ab khel khatam, Kissa tamaam shuddh " (the game is over and the entire story has come to an end) and walks away with Mohini, as the prisoners look on and the credits begin to roll.

== Cast ==
- Suniel Shetty as Ravi Malhotra
- Sonali Bendre as Mohini
- Naseeruddin Shah as Inspector D'Costa
- Shafi Inamdar as DCP Mishra
- Kunickaa Sadanand as Sheena Vasudev, News Editor
- Archana Puran Singh as Maya, D'Costa's mistress.
- Himani Shivpuri as Mohini's mother
- Tiku Talsania as Mamaji
- Ajit Vachani as Sikandar Bakht
- Sudhir Dalvi as Commissioner of Police
- Sameer Khakhar as Police Constable
- Rakesh Bedi as Prisoner Kaku
- Pramod Moutho as Prisoner with Yellow Robe.
- Mohan Joshi as Raja Thakur
- Ishrat Ali as Kale Sarkar

== Track listing ==
- Lyrics: Rahat Indori, Nawab Arzoo, Maya Govind, Dev Kohli & Rani Malik
- Singers: Kumar Sanu, Abhijeet Bhattacharya, Alka Yagnik, Alisha Chinoy & Sapna Mukherjee
- Music: Anu Malik

No.	Title	Lyrics	Singer(s)	Length
1.	"Aankhon Mein Base Ho Tum"	Maya Govind	Abhijeet Bhattacharya, Alka Yagnik	05:35
2.	"Dil Gaya Haanthon Se"	Rani Malik	Kumar Sanu, Alka Yagnik	07:01
3.	"My Name Is Laila"	Rahat Indori	Sapna Mukherjee	06:04
4.	"Palkein Ho Khuli Ya Bandh"	Rani Malik	Kumar Sanu, Alka Yagnik	05:53
5.	"Love Is Mad"	Dev Kohli	Alisha Chinoy	06:37
6.	"Aankhon Mein Basaya Tha"	Maya Govind	Kumar Sanu	05:34
7.	"Teri Aankhon Ne Aisa Kamaal Ki"	Nawab Arzoo	Kumar Sanu, Alka Yagnik	06:18
