= Ab To Aaja Saajan Mere =

- Directed by: Rakesh Nahata
- Written by: Pooja Bhatt; Seema Nahata
- Produced by: Rakesh Nahata
- Starring: Arvind Joshi; Shalini Kapoor
- Music by: Anand–Milind
- Release date: 1994
- Country: India
- Language: Hindi

Ab To Aaja Saajan Mere is a 1994 Indian Bollywood film produced and directed by Rakesh Nahata. It stars Arvind Joshi and Shalini Kapoor .

== Cast ==
- Arvind Joshi... Mahenga
- Shaiini Kapoor... Ganga
- Roma Manik... Jamuna D. Singh
- Arvind Rathod... Ramdas
- Suresh Varma... Shyamkumar 'Shyam' V. Singh

== Soundtrack ==
1. "Ab To Aaja Sajan" – Alka Yagnik
2. "Jab Tak Hai Dum" – Shabbir Kumar
3. "Khul Gaya Kajra" – Shabbir Kumar
4. "Odhni Odhu Toh" – Falguni Pathak
