= Coolie No. 1 (2020 film) =

2020 Indian film by David Dhawan

- Official release poster
- Directed by: David Dhawan
- Screenplay by: Rumi Jaffrey
- Based on: Chinna Mapillai by P. Kalaimani
- Produced by: Vashu Bhagnani; Jackky Bhagnani; Deepshikha Deshmukh
- Starring: Varun Dhawan; Sara Ali Khan; Paresh Rawal
- Cinematography: Ravi K. Chandran
- Edited by: Ritesh Soni
- Music by: Songs: Salim–Sulaiman; Anand-Milind; Tanishk Bagchi; Lijo George-DJ Chetas; Javed-Mohsin; Background Score: Salim–Sulaiman
- Production company: Pooja Entertainment
- Distributed by: Amazon Prime Video; Tips Industries
- Release date: 25 December 2020
- Running time: 135 minutes
- Country: India
- Language: Hindi

Coolie No. 1 is a 2020 Indian Hindi-language masala film directed by David Dhawan and produced by Vashu Bhagnani. A reboot of his own 1995 film of the same name, which itself is a remake of the Tamil film Chinna Mapillai (1993), the film stars Varun Dhawan, Sara Ali Khan, and Paresh Rawal. When a matchmaker is insulted by Jeffrey Rozario, a rich businessman, he vows to exact revenge. As a result, he makes a porter pretend to be a rich man and marries him off to Rozario's daughter.

Principal photography began on 8 August 2019 in Bangkok.

The film was set to be theatrically released in India on 1 May 2020, but was postponed due to the COVID-19 pandemic. Later, it was released on 25 December, during Christmas, on Amazon Prime Video.

== Plot ==
Pandit Jai Kishen brings a prospective groom's family to Sarah Rozario. But when her father Jeffrey learns that the family isn't filthy rich, he insults Jai Kishen. Jai Kishen vows to teach Jeffrey a lesson for his arrogance and pride.

On the way home, Jai Kishen bumps into Raju Coolie, a railway station porter who proudly wears his badge - "Coolie No. 1". Raju is known among his fellow porters for being heroic, recently having gotten a drug dealer Mahesh arrested. When Raju is smitten by Sarah's photo, Jai Kishen hatches a plan to get the poor porter married to Sarah and exact his revenge. With Jai Kishen's guidance and the help of his friend Deepak Mechanic, Raju poses as the prince of Singapore, Kunwar Raj Pratap Singh and wins Sarah's heart. In the process, Sarah's sister Anju falls for Deepak.

Jeffrey gets Sarah married to Raju, not knowing that he is just a poor porter. When Raju returns home with Sarah after the wedding, he pretends that his "father" Mahendra Pratap Singh has thrown him out of the house for getting married without his consent. Sarah tries to make the best out of the given situation by cheering up Raj, which makes him feel guilty.

The trouble becomes double when Jeffrey comes to town to visit his daughter and son-in-law but spots Raju as a coolie at the train station. Jeffrey creates a ruckus, saying that Raju is a fraud who posed as a rich prince and married his daughter. Spontaneously, Raju pretends to not recognise Jeffrey and shoos him away. Raju comes home dressed as Raj and explains that Jeffrey must have seen his twin brother Raju who his father threw out due to his drinking and gambling addictions. Jeffrey buys this story and decides to get Anju married to Raju, so that both his daughters will live filthy rich lives.

Raju keeps getting into trouble since he can be only at one place at one time. One such incident forces Raju, Sarah and Jeffrey Rozario to file a missing complaint for Kunwar Raj Pratap Singh. Inspector Jagjit Godbole gets skeptical of the situation and starts to believe that Raju and his twin Raj are the same person. To prevent further problems, Deepak suggests that he should "kill" Raju. Taking this suggestion, Raju tosses his "Coolie No. 1" badge into a car which he and Deepak push down a cliff, into a lake. However, when the car is recovered but no body is found, Inspector Godbole's suspicions are confirmed.

Mahesh Anand is disowned by his father, Mahendra, due to his criminal activities. To get back at him and Raju, Mahesh stabs Mahendra and frames Raju for the same. Inspector Godbole arrives to arrest him, but Raju informs him that Mahendra is still alive and needs critical medical care, following which he escapes police custody. Raju runs to Deepak, and both of them hatch a plan to pretend to be nurses to save Mahendra's life, as that is Raju's only proof of innocence. At the hospital, Inspector Godbole tells Jeffrey, Sarah, and Anju that Raju is just a porter who pretended to be Kunwar Raj Pratap Singh.

While trying to save Mahendra, Raju and Deepak bump into Sarah and Anju. Raju confesses his fraud to Sarah, and she forgives him. Jeffrey and Sarah help Raju and Deepak to stop Mahesh from killing Mahendra. Once he gains consciousness, Mahendra announces that since Raju saved his life, he is like a son to him. Anju also announces her love for Deepak. When Jeffrey cries about his sons-in-law being a porter and a mechanic, Jai Kishen arrives and tells Jeffrey that it was bound to happen to someone so arrogant and proud of his wealth. Jai Kishen explains that for a happy marriage, wealth isn't needed-love is.

== Cast ==
- Varun Dhawan in a double role as
  - Raju Coolie
  - Kunwar Raj Pratap Singh (Cameo Appearance)
- Sara Ali Khan as Sarah Pratap Singh (née Rozario): Jeffrey's daughter, Anju's sister and Raju's wife
- Paresh Rawal as Jeffrey Rozario: Sarah and Anju's father
- Jaaved Jaaferi as Pandit Jai Kishen / Secretary Jackson
- Rajpal Yadav as Pinto Mama: Sarah and Anju's uncle and Jeffrey's brother-in-law
- Johnny Lever as Inspector Jagjit Godbole
- Sahil Vaid as Deepak Mechanic: Raju's best friend and Anju's fiancé
- Shikha Talsania as Anjali "Anju" Rozario: Jeffrey's daughter, Sarah's sister and Deepak's fiancé
- Vikas Verma as Mahesh Pratap Singh: Mahendra's son
- Manoj Joshi as Mahendra's manager
- Anil Dhawan as Mahendra Pratap Singh: Mahesh's father
- Bharati Achrekar as Mrs. Rozario: Jeffrey's mother and Sarah and Anju's grandmother
- Rajat Rawail as Mac, a bellboy at Raju/Raj, Anju and Sarah's honeymoon hotel
- Rakesh Bedi as driver and Shalini's father
- Shashi Kiran as Coolie Chacha: Raju's uncle
- Hemant Pandey as Tambe, owner of the South Indian Restaurant
- Farhad Samji as plumber at the Rozario Hotel
- Shibesh Debnath as Vishu Coolie: Raju's fellow porter
- Girdhar Swami as casting director

== Production ==
=== Development ===
Varun Dhawan said In a short time interview with Indo-Asian News Service, producer Bhangani said that David Dhawan wanted to remake the Tamil film Chinna Mapillai (1993). Other sources point the Telugu film Coolie No. 1 (1991) as the original story. Karthik Keramulu of Film Companion notes that the Coolie No. 1 (1995) was a remake of Chinna Mapillai, but also took inspiration from Coolie No. 1 (1991).

=== Principal photography ===
Filming began in Bangkok on 8 August 2019, and also took place Goa, India. The filming was completed on 23 February 2020 and was scheduled for release on 1 May 2020. However, due to COVID-19 pandemic the film skipped the theatrical release and was streamed on Amazon Prime Video on 25 December 2020.

== Soundtrack ==
Coolie No. 1

Soundtrack album by Tanishk Bagchi, Anand-Milind, Lijo George – DJ Chetas, Javed – Mohsin and Salim–Sulaiman
- Released: 22 December 2020
- Recorded: 2019–2020
- Genre: Feature film soundtrack
- Length: 21:57
- Language: Hindi
- Labels: Zee Music Company (All Songs); Tips Music (Husnn Hai Suhaana & Mirchi Lagi Toh)

Official audio
- Coolie No. 1 - Full Album on YouTube

The music of the film was composed by Tanishk Bagchi, Lijo George – DJ Chetas, Javed–Mohsin and Salim–Sulaiman while the lyrics were written by Sameer Anjaan, Rashmi Virag, Shabbir Ahmed, Danish Sabri, Ikka and Farhad Samji.

Two of the songs from the Coolie No. 1 (1995) - "Husn Hai Suhana" and "Main Toh Raste Se Jaa Raha Tha", originally composed by Anand-Milind and written by Sameer were recreated for the film with the original vocals and singers being retained.

Track listing
No.	Title	Lyrics	Music	Singer(s)	Length
1.	"Teri Bhabhi"	Danish Sabri	Javed – Mohsin	Dev Negi, Neha Kakkar, Javed–Mohsin	3:22
2.	"Husnn Hai Suhaana New"	Sameer Anjaan	Tanishk Bagchi	Chandana Dixit, Abhijeet Bhattacharya	4:27
3.	"Mummy Kassam"	Shabbir Ahmed, Ikka	Tanishk Bagchi	Udit Narayan, Ikka, Monali Thakur	3:32
4.	"Mirchi Lagi Toh New"	Sameer Anjaan	Lijo George – DJ Chetas	Kumar Sanu, Alka Yagnik	5:22
5.	"Tere Siva"	Rashmi Virag	Tanishk Bagchi	Renessa Das, Ash King	3:07
6.	"Coolie No. 1" (Title Track)	Farhad Samji	Salim–Sulaiman	Raj Pandit	2:07
Total length:					21:57

== Release ==
The film was set to be theatrically released in India on 1 May 2020, but was postponed due to the COVID-19 pandemic.

But as the pandemic refused to slow down, the film was released directly on Amazon Prime Video on 25 December 2020, coinciding with Christmas.

== Reception ==
The film was panned by critics, who rejected its irritative performances, loose writing, stale humor, and some unrealistic situations. On the review aggregator website Rotten Tomatoes, 0% of 8 critics' reviews are positive, with an average rating of 2.7/10. Shubhra Gupta of Indian Express rated it 1 out of 5 stars, calling it a "zero wit, no flair". Writing for Film Companion, Anupama Chopra called the film "offensive and unfunny". Hindustan Times rated the film 1/5 stars and called the film limp spoof of the original.

Taran Adarsh of Bollywood Hungama rated it 3.5/5 stars, calling it funny and entertaining.

== See also ==
- List of films with a 0% rating on Rotten Tomatoes
