= Swati Chaturvedi =

Indian journalist

Swati Chaturvedi is an Indian journalist and author. She won the Prize for Courage, in 2018, awarded by Reporters Without Borders for journalism in a hostile environment.

== Biography ==
Chaturvedi has worked for various Indian newspapers and channels, like The Statesman, The Indian Express, Hindustan Times, The Tribune, NDTV, DailyO, The Wire, Gulf News and Deccan Herald. She has also published two books; Daddy's Girl and I am a Troll: Inside the Secret World of the BJP's Digital Army.

Chaturvedi won the Prize for Courage, in 2018, awarded by Reporters Without Borders for journalism in a hostile environment.

== See also ==
- Barkha Dutt
