= Manik Bedi =

Indian actor

Manek Bedi
- Occupations: Actor; Producer
- Parent: Narendra Bedi (father)
- Relatives: Rajendra Singh Bedi (grandfather); Rajat Bedi (brother); Ila Bedi Dutta (sister)

Manek Bedi is a Bollywood actor. He is currently a Film and TV producer and has produced television series Hitler Didi for Zee TV.

== Filmography ==
Year	Film	Role	Notes
1996	Ram Aur Shyam	Shyam	Debut film
1997	Bhai Bhai	Veeru	
1998	Dand Nayak	Suraj	
1998	Hitler	Amar	
1998	Jaane Jigar	Vijay	
1998	Zanjeer	Ajay	
1998	Sar Utha Ke Jiyo	Suraj Khanna	
1999	Sikandar Sadak Ka	Ram	
2000	Sabse Bada Beiman		
2002	Sabse Badkar Hum	Raja	
2002	Maseeha	Vijay Shrivastav	
2003	LOC: Kargil	Maj. Ritesh Sharma, 17 Jat Regiment	
2007	The Blue Umbrella	Arjun	

=== Television ===
- Mose Chhal Kiye Jaaye on Sony Entertainment Television (2022)
- Ghum Hai Kisikey Pyaar Meiin as Mukul Deshmukh on Star Plus (2024)
- Deewaniyat as Jaideep Choudary on Star Plus (2024–2025)
- Apsara on Star Plus (2026–present)
