= Rakshak =

- Directed by: Ashok Honda
- Written by: Naeem - Ejaz (dialogues); K. S. Ravi (Story-Screenplay)
- Based on: Honest Raj (Tamil) by K. S. Ravi
- Produced by: Ashok Honda
- Starring: Suniel Shetty; Karisma Kapoor; Sonali Bendre; Raghuvaran
- Cinematography: Teja
- Edited by: Ashok Honda
- Music by: Anand–Milind
- Release date: 29 November 1996
- Running time: 164 minutes
- Country: India
- Language: Hindi
- Box office: ₹11.2 crore

Rakshak (transl. Protector) is 1996 Indian Hindi-language action thriller film directed by Ashok Honda, starring Sunil Shetty, Karisma Kapoor, Raghuvaran, Sonali Bendre, Alok Nath and Aruna Irani. It is a remake of the Tamil film Honest Raj.

== Plot ==
Raj and his mother come to visit village. Raj meets his best friend Raghu, and love interest Suman. They eventually marry and Raj becomes an IPS officer. Raj’s mother considers Raghu too like her own son and even helps him financially in his time of distress, when he was actually about to commit suicide.

Raj and his family travel back to the city whereas Raghu starts printing fake currency to get rid of his loans and credits and becomes the mafia boss of the village.

Raj, in their next trip to the village, finds out Raghu’s secret but is attacked severely by Raghu's goons, who also kill his mother and Suman. Dr. Pooja Malhotra treats him to recover and take revenge on his friend turned enemy Raghu.

== Cast ==
- Suniel Shetty as ASP Raj Sinha
- Karishma Kapoor as Suman Sinha
- Sonali Bendre as Dr. Pooja Malhotra
- Raghuvaran as Raghavan "Raghu"
- Aruna Irani as Raj's mother
- Mushtaq Khan as Bhola
- Dinesh Hingoo as Suman's father
- Pramod Moutho as Bardha Seth
- Ponnambalam as Danyaal
- Alok Nath as Commissioner of Police
- Harish Patel as Rokde
- Deepak Shirke as ACP Shirke
- Arun Bakshi as Advocate
- Shiv Kumar Subramaniam as The photographer
- Raveena Tandon in a special appearance in the song 'Shehar Ki Ladki'
- Zeeshan Shaikh as Bunty

== Soundtrack ==
Rakshak

Soundtrack album by Anand-Milind
- Released: August 11, 1996 (Audio Cassette); October 1, 1996 (Audio CD)
- Genre: Feature film soundtrack
- Language: Hindi
- Labels: BIG B Music; T-Series

Anand-Milind chronology
Chhote Sarkar (1996)	Rakshak (1996)	Ajay (1996)

After average success with the movie Anth (which was a semi-hit at the box office), producer-director Ashok Honda again employed music directors Anand–Milind for Rakshak. Lyricist Sameer was also re-hired, but for only one song (Kuchi Kuchi). New lyricist Deepak Chowdhary wrote the remaining songs.

The song "Shehar Ki Ladki" was recreated for Khandaani Shafakhana, the recreated version is sung by Tulsi Kumar and Badshah on the music of Tanishk Bagchi who has also rewritten the new song.

No.	Title	Singer(s)	Length
1.	"Shehar Ki Ladki"	Abhijeet, Chandana Dixit	5:58
2.	"Kuchi Kuchi"	Kumar Sanu, Alka Yagnik
3.	"Sundara Sundara"	Vinod Rathod, Sapna Mukherjee
4.	"Zaalim Jahan Berang Hai"	S. P. Balasubrahmanyam
5.	"Ooiiyan Ooiiyan"	Udit Narayan, Poornima
6.	"Parody"	Abhijeet Bhattacharya, Aditya Narayan, Poornima

== Awards ==
For this film, choreographers Chinni Prakash and Rekha Prakash won the Filmfare Award for Best Choreography for the song "Shehar Ki Ladki" at the Filmfare Awards 1997.

== Reception ==
The film was the 3 rd Hit of Sunil Shetty in 1996..
