= Sanam (1997 film) =

- DVD cover
- Directed by: Aziz Sejawal
- Written by: Anees Bazmee (dialogues)
- Screenplay by: Rajeev Kaul, Praful Parekh
- Story by: Yunus Sajawal
- Produced by: Sameer Hingora, Hanif Kadawala
- Starring: Sanjay Dutt; Manisha Koirala; Vivek Mushran
- Cinematography: Rajan Kinagi
- Edited by: Gurudutt Shirali, Waman Bhonsle
- Music by: Anand–Milind
- Production company: Magnum Films International
- Release date: 9 May 1997
- Running time: 156 minutes
- Country: India
- Language: Hindi
- Budget: ₹1.75 crore
- Box office: ₹3.10 crore

Sanam is a 1997 Hindi language romantic drama action film directed and produced by Aziz Sejawal. Written by Anees Bazmee, it starred Sanjay Dutt, Manisha Koirala, Vivek Mushran, Anupam Kher, Dalip Tahil, Kader Khan, Anjan Srivastav, Gulshan Grover and Shakti Kapoor. The music, composed by Anand–Milind, was the biggest strength of this film. The movie did average business at the box office.

== Plot ==
Gaurav (Vivek Mushran) lives a wealthy lifestyle, gets everything he wants except the love of his parents and family. Even though he lives with his parents, they love his elder brother Narendra (Sanjay Dutt) more. Narendra is often pronounced by the name of "Hero" by his parents, and goes abroad for his job once a while. When Hero comes back home for a holiday, he goes to a funfair with his family, and witnesses a little girl who is stuck on top of a Ferris wheel, and when Hero gets the chance, he climbs up and rescues her. By the time he jumps off, it is already on fire, which causes it to explode, and blows Hero off with it as well. The whole family is devastated by Hero's death, and since he was the only one who made a name for his family, Gaurav finally feals pity and joins the army to prove to his father that he is worthy to be the Hero's younger brother. While on duty, Gaurav discovers that Angara and General (Shakti Kapoor, Gulshan Grover) are about to plant bombs through the whole of India, and that would just not mean for his parents and friends to die, but also his loving girlfriend, Sanam (Manisha Koirala).

== Cast ==
- Manisha Koirala as Sanam, Gaurav's love interest.
- Sanjay Dutt as Narendra Anand / Hero (special appearance)
- Vivek Mushran as Gaurav Anand
- Shakti Kapoor as Angara
- Anupam Kher as Seth Yashpal Anand, father of Gaurav and Narendra
- Kader Khan as Khan Bahadur
- Aanjjan Srivastav as Marghat Lal
- Gulshan Grover as General
- Asrani as Police Inspector
- Maya Alagh as Mrs. Meeta Anand, Mother of Gaurav's and Narendra
- Razak Khan as Gama Pehlawan The Man with broken leg
- Dalip Tahil as Major Altaf Khan
- Harish Patel as Balwant Sinha
- Usha Nadkarni
- Rami Reddy as Shera
- Arun Bakshi as the constable questioning Khan about his vehicle
- Ishrat Ali as Lala Lambu Atta, Khan's landlord
- Sulabha Deshpande
- Dinesh Hingoo as Office Clerk Laal Singh
- Viju Khote as Palmist Damodar
- Achyut Potdar as Datta Leader
- Manav Kaul as Military Officer

== Soundtrack ==
The music was composed by Anand–Milind, with lyrics by Sameer. The soundtrack for this film was released back in 1993. The songs "Ankhon Mein Neende Na Dil" and "Ishq Mein Mere Rabba" were very popular and featured in Cibaca Geet Mala 1993.

	Title	Singer(s)
1	"Ankhon Mein Neende Na Dil"	Alka Yagnik, Kumar Sanu
2	"Ishq Mein Mere Rabba"	Alka Yagnik, Kumar Sanu
3	"Khuda Kare Mohabbat Mein"	Pankaj Udhas
4	"Kal Tak Jo Maine Na"	Kumar Sanu, Sadhana Sargam
5	"Maine Kal Ek Sapna Dekha"	Amit Kumar, Vinod Rathod
6	"Kasam Se Kasam Khake Kahdo"	Abhijeet, Kavita Krishnamurthy
7	"Raqs Mein Hain Sara Jahan"	Arun Ingle, Chorus
8	"Dhak Dhak Dil Ghabraye Sajna"	Kavita Krishnamurthy
9	"Sanam Ka Naam Aaye"	Sadhana Sargam

== Controversy ==
The film was in news because of Dutt's involvement in the 1993 Bombay Bombings. During his statement he said that while he was shooting for the film producers Hanif and Samir arranged the gun from gangster Abu Salem. As a result, Dutt distanced himself from the film and its delayed release.
