= Insaaf (1997 film) =

1997 film by Dayal Nihalani

- Directed by: Dayal Nihalani
- Written by: Dilip Shukla (dialogues)
- Screenplay by: Dilip Shukla
- Story by: Dayal Nihalani
- Produced by: Jimmy Nirula
- Starring: Akshay Kumar; Shilpa Shetty; Paresh Rawal
- Cinematography: Shankar Bardhan
- Edited by: Ashok Shrivastav
- Music by: Anand–Milind
- Production company: Manish Arts
- Distributed by: Time Magnetics Pvt.Ltd
- Release date: 30 May 1997
- Running time: 155 minutes
- Country: India
- Language: Hindi
- Budget: ₹3.50 crore
- Box office: ₹6.64 crore

Insaaf, also known as Insaaf: The Final Justice, is a 1997 Indian Bollywood action film directed and written by Dayal Nihalani and starring Akshay Kumar, Shilpa Shetty and Paresh Rawal. It was released on 30 May 1997.

A witness to a murder is killed and honest police officer Vikram lays a trap to catch the killers by getting his girlfriend to pose as the witness. They do succeed, but also make a shocking discovery.

== Cast ==
Actor/Actress	Role
Akshay Kumar	Inspector Vikram Singh Jain (Vicky)
Shilpa Shetty	Divya
Paresh Rawal	Chimanbhai Kathiawadi
Ranjeet	Inspector Lokhande
Alok Nath	Jagat Narayan, MP
Vishwajeet Pradhan	Vilayti
Dinesh Hingoo	Parsi man in a friendly appearance
Achyut Potdar	Anjali's father
Mohan Joshi	Police Commissioner Satish Kulkarni
Rana Jung Bahadur	Janardhan
Anjalika Mathur	Aarti Singh, Vikram's sister
Anil Nagrath	Shah
Indrani Banerjee	Anjali

== Soundtrack ==
Music was composed by Anand-Milind and songs were written by Sameer

#	Title	Singer(s)
1	"Bara Aana De ..."	Abhijeet
2	"Taana Tandaana"	Abhijeet, Poornima
3	"Ding a Dong Rapappo"	Vinod Rathod, Chorus
4	"Hum To Tanhai Sanam"	Alka Yagnik
5	"Krishna Krishna"	Alisha Chinai
6	"Meri Jaane Jaana"	Parvez Gayatri
