= Coolie No. 1 (1995 film) =

1995 Indian film by David Dhawan

- Theatrical release poster
- Directed by: David Dhawan
- Written by: Rumi Jaffery
- Dialogues by: Kader Khan
- Story by: Amma creations P. Kalaimani (uncredited)
- Based on: Chinna Mapillai by P. Kalaimani
- Produced by: Vashu Bhagnani
- Starring: Govinda; Karisma Kapoor; Harish Kumar; Kanchan; Kader Khan; Mahesh Anand; Sadashiv Amrapurkar; Shakti Kapoor
- Cinematography: Rajan Kinagi
- Edited by: A. Muthu
- Music by: Songs: Anand–Milind; Score: Shyam-Surinder
- Production company: Pooja Films
- Distributed by: Tips Industries Limited
- Release date: 30 June 1995 (India)
- Running time: 161 minutes
- Country: India
- Language: Hindi
- Budget: ₹3.50 crore
- Box office: ₹21.22 crore

Coolie No. 1 is a 1995 Indian Hindi-language masala film directed by David Dhawan, and written by Rumi Jaffery and Kader Khan. The film stars Govinda, Karisma Kapoor, Kader Khan, Shakti Kapoor, Harish Kumar, Sadashiv Amrapurkar and Mahesh Anand, with music by Anand–Milind. The film is a remake of the Tamil film Chinna Mapillai (1993).

Govinda received the Star Screen Award Special Jury Award for his role in this movie as 'performer of the decade'. Over the years, the movie has become a classic in Hindi film history and is now considered a cult film and one of the greatest Indian comedy films ever made. In 2020, Dhawan remade the film with the same name with his son Varun Dhawan, Sara Ali Khan and Paresh Rawal.

== Plot ==
Pandit Shadiram Gharjode (Sadashiv Amrapurkar) brings a prospective groom's family for Malti Choudhry (Karisma Kapoor). But when her father Choudhry Hoshiyar Chand (Kader Khan), learns that the family isn't filthy rich, he insults Gharjode. He vows to teach Hoshiyar Chand a lesson for his arrogance and pride.

On the way home, Shadiram Gharjode bumps into Raju Coolie (Govinda) a bus stand porter who proudly wears his badge - "Coolie No. 1". Raju is known among his fellow porters for being heroic, recently having gotten a drug dealer Mahesh (Mahesh Anand) arrested. When Raju is smitten by Malti's photo, Gharjode hatches a plan to get the poor porter married to Malti and exact his revenge. With Gharjode's guidance and the help of his best friend Deepak Mechanic (Harish Kumar), Raju poses as the prince of Singapore, Kunwar Mahendra Pratap Singh Mehta and wins Malti's heart. In the process, Malti's sister Shalini (Kaanchan) falls for Deepak.

Hoshiyar Chand gets Malti married to Raju, not knowing that he is just a poor porter. When Raju returns home with Malti after the wedding, he pretends that his "father" Gajendra Pratap Singh Mehta (Kulbhushan Kharbanda) has thrown him out of the house for getting married without his consent. Malti tries to make the best out of the given situation by cheering up Mahendra, which makes him feel guilty.

The trouble becomes double when Hoshiyar Chand comes to town to visit his daughter and son-in-law but spots Raju as a coolie at the bus stand. Hoshiyar Chand creates a ruckus, saying that Raju is a fraud who posed as a rich prince and married his daughter. Spontaneously, Raju pretends to not recognise Hoshiyar Chand and shoos him away. Raju comes home dressed as Mahendra and explains that Hoshiyar Chand must have seen his twin brother Raju who his father threw out due to his drinking and gambling addictions. Hoshiyar Chand buys this story and decides to get Shalini married to Raju, so that both his daughters will live filthy rich lives.

Raju keeps getting into trouble since he can only be in one place at one time. One such incident forces Raju, Malti and Hoshiyar Chand to file a missing persons complaint for Kunwar Mahendra Pratap Singh Mehta. Inspector Rakesh Pandey (Tiku Talsania) gets sceptical of the situation and starts to believe that Raju and his twin brother Mahendra are the same person.

Mahesh Pratap Mehta is disowned by his father Gajendra Pratap Singh Mehta due to his criminal activities. To get back at him and Raju, Mahesh stabs Gajendra and frames Raju for the same. Inspector Pandey arrives to arrest him, but Raju informs him that Gajendra is still alive and needs critical medical care, following which he escapes police custody. Raju runs to Deepak and both of them hatch a plan to pretend to be nurses from Singapore to save Gajendra's life, as that is Raju's only proof of innocence. At the hospital, Inspector Pandey tells Hoshiyar Chand, Malti and Shalini that Raju is just a poor porter who pretended to be Kunwar Mahendra Pratap Singh Mehta.

While trying to save Gajendra, Raju and Deepak bump into Malti, Hoshiyar Chand and Shalini, who come to abort Shalini's unborn child, who came because of Deepak. Raju confesses his fraud to Malti, and she forgives him. Hoshiyar Chand and Malti help Raju and Deepak to stop Mahesh from killing Gajendra. Once he gains consciousness, Gajendra announces that since Raju saved his life, he is like a son to him. Shalini also announces her love for Deepak. When Hoshiyar Chand cries about his sons-in-law being a porter and a mechanic, Shaadiram Gharjode arrives and tells Hoshiyar Chand that it was bound to happen to someone so arrogant and proud of his wealth. Gharjode explains that for a happy marriage, wealth isn't needed - love is.

== Cast ==
- Govinda as Raju Coolie / Kunwar Mahendra Pratap Singh
- Karisma Kapoor as Malti Choudhry
- Harish Kumar as Deepak Mechanic
- Kaanchan as Shalini Choudhry, Malti's sister
- Kader Khan as Choudhry Hoshiyar Chand Shikaarpuri Barudwallah, Shalini and Malti's father
- Shakti Kapoor as Goverdhan Mama, Shalini and Malti's uncle
- Sadashiv Amrapurkar as Pandit Shaadiram Gharjode / Mahendra's secretary
- Kulbhushan Kharbanda as Gajendra Pratap Singh Mehta, Mahesh's father (cameo appearance)
- Javed Khan Amrohi as a Taxi Driver
- Dinesh Hingoo as a Game Show Host (special appearance)
- Mahesh Anand as Mahesh Pratap Singh Mehta, Gajendra's son (cameo appearance)
- Vikas Anand as Shaadiram's client (special appearance)
- Tiku Talsania as Inspector Rakesh Pandey (guest appearance)
- Shammi as Mrs. Choudhry, Hoshiyar Chand's mother
- Babbanlal Yadav as a street magician (special appearance)
- Mahavir Shah as Arvind Shukla, Gajendra's manager (cameo appearance)

== Music ==
The film's soundtrack album sold around 2.8 million units, making it one of the best-selling Bollywood soundtracks of the year.

All songs lyrics are written by Sameer; all music is composed by Anand–Milind.

=== Track listing ===
#	Title	Singer(s)	Length
1.	"Main Toh Raste Se Ja Raha Tha"	Kumar Sanu, Alka Yagnik	05:18
2.	"Husn Hai Suhana"	Abhijeet, Chandana Dixit	06:00
3.	"Aa Jaana Aa Jaana"	Kumar Sanu, Alka Yagnik	06:22
4.	"Tere Pyar Mein Dil Deewana"	Udit Narayan, Alka Yagnik	05:00
5.	"Jeth Ki Dopahri Mein"	Kumar Sanu, Poornima	05:00
6.	"Kya Majnu Kya Ranjha"	Kumar Sanu, Sadhna Sargam	06:31
7.	"Coolie No. 1"	Kumar Sanu	05:24

== Remake ==
On 8 March 2019, it was announced that the film will be remade, with David Dhawan as director again and with his son Varun Dhawan and Sara Ali Khan playing the roles of Raju Coolie and Malti Choudhry. The first look poster of the remake Coolie No. 1 was released on 12 August 2019 on Khan's birthday. The film was originally scheduled to release on 1 May 2020 but was shifted to 25 December 2020 because of COVID-19 pandemic. This film started streaming on 25th December on Amazon Prime Video.
