= Khandaani Shafakhana =

2019 Indian film by Shilpi Dasgupta

- Theatrical release poster
- Directed by: Shilpi Dasgupta
- Written by: Gautam Mehra
- Produced by: Bhushan Kumar; Mahaveer Jain; Mrighdeep Singh Lamba; Divya Khosla Kumar; Krishan Kumar
- Starring: Sonakshi Sinha; Varun Sharma; Annu Kapoor; Badshah
- Cinematography: Rishi Punjabi
- Edited by: Dev Rao Jadhav
- Music by: Songs: Tanishk Bagchi; Rochak Kohli; Badshah; Payal Dev; Score: Abhishek Nailwal
- Production companies: Sundial Productions; T-Series
- Distributed by: Panorama Studios
- Release date: 2 August 2019
- Running time: 136 minutes
- Country: India
- Language: Hindi
- Budget: ₹24 crore
- Box office: est. ₹3.98 crore

Khandaani Shafakhana (transl. Familial clinic) is a 2019 Indian Hindi-language comedy-drama film directed by debutante Shilpi Dasgupta, starring Sonakshi Sinha and Badshah, with Varun Sharma and Annu Kapoor supporting roles. The film was theatrically released in India on 2 August 2019.

== Plot ==
Babita "Baby" Bedi, a middle class Punjabi girl, is working as a medical representative and the only earner in the house. She gets constantly shouted at by her boss and is unhappy with her job. Her uncle, who had lent them money earlier, has his eyes fixed upon Baby's house, which is the only remainder of her dead father.

One day she inherits her uncle, Mamaji's wealth after he is killed by a man. His will states that Baby is the sole heir of his property and that she has to run a fertility clinic for six months in order to sell it or else she will lose everything. She will have to face many obstacles of this society that is conservative towards women.

In order to deal with her old job, she sends Bhooshit, her brother, in place of her, claiming 6 months' sick leave. How she manages to run the clinic for the six months she has to forms the crux of the story.

== Cast ==
- Sonakshi Sinha as Babita "Baby" Bedi
- Badshah as Gabru Ghatack
- Varun Sharma as Bhooshit Bedi
- Annu Kapoor as Tagra
- Priyansh Jora as Lemon Hero
- Kulbhushan Kharbanda as Hakim Tarachand aka Mamaji
- Rajesh Sharma as Judge Joshav Agarwal
- Nadira Babbar as Mrs. Bedi
- Rajiv Gupta as Chachaji
- Shirin Sewani as Sheetu
- Ashok Pathak as Bangali Baba
- Diana Penty as Sunita (special appearance in song "Shehar Ki Ladki")
- Suniel Shetty (special appearance in song "Shehar Ki Ladki")
- Raveena Tandon (special appearance in song "Shehar Ki Ladki")
- Vishal O Sharma as Jhalla Halwai

== Production ==
The principal photography of the film began in Punjab in the end of January 2019. The film also marks the acting debut of Badshah.

== Marketing and release ==
The film was slated to release on 2 August 2019, after the initial release dates were changed. The film certified with a runtime of 136 minutes by British Board of Film Classification, was released on 2 August 2019.

== Soundtrack ==
Khandaani Shafakhana

Soundtrack album by Tanishk Bagchi, Rochak Kohli, Badshah and Payal Dev
- Released: 26 July 2019
- Recorded: 2019
- Genre: Feature film soundtrack
- Length: 21:57
- Language: Hindi
- Label: T-Series
External audio
- Official Audio Jukebox on YouTube

The music of the film is composed by Tanishk Bagchi, Rochak Kohli, Badshah and Payal Dev and lyrics written by Badshah, Shyam Bhateja, Tanishk Bagchi, Kumaar, Mellow D, Shabbir Ahmed Gautam G Sharma and Gurpreet Saini. The song "Koka" is the remake of a song of the same name sung by Jasbir Jassi. The recreated version is also sung by Jassi, co-voiced by Badshah and Dhvani Bhanushali. The song "Shehar Ki Ladki" which is picturised on Diana Penty, is a recreated song from Rakshak (1996), originally pictured on Raveena Tandon. It was revealed that the original cast of Raveena Tandon and Suniel Shetty that featured in song sequence will appear in this song sequence to create nostalgic moments. The song was originally sung by Abhijeet Bhattacharya and Chandana Dixit and composed by Anand–Milind in 1996. Playback singer Payal Dev made her debut as a composer in the song "Dil Jaaniye".

Track listing
| No. | Title | Lyrics | Music | Singer(s) | Length |
|---|---|---|---|---|---|
| 1. | "Koka" | Tanishk Bagchi, Mellow D | Tanishk Bagchi | Jasbir Jassi, Badshah, Dhvani Bhanushali | 2:56 |
| 2. | "Shehar Ki Ladki" | Deepak Chaudhary, Tanishk Bagchi | Anand Milind, Tanishk Bagchi | Badshah, Tulsi Kumar, Abhijeet, Chandana Dixit | 2:52 |
| 3. | "Dil Jaaniye" | Shabbir Ahmed | Payal Dev | Jubin Nautiyal, Tulsi Kumar | 4:42 |
| 4. | "Saans To Le Le" | Badshah | Badshah | Badshah, Rico | 3:17 |
| 5. | "Udd Jaa" | Kumaar | Rochak Kohli | Tochi Raina | 4:11 |
| 6. | "Bheege Mann" | Gautam G Sharma, Gurpreet Saini | Rochak Kohli | Altamash Faridi | 3:59 |
| Total length: | | | | | 21:57 |

== Reception ==
=== Critical reception ===
Raja Sen of The Hindustan Times wrote, "As a nation, we need to talk about sex. We're obviously having enough of it to not be scandalised this easy. It's not all shock and haww". Namrata Joshi of The Hindu wrote, "Khandaani Shafakhana may have a laudable message at its core, but gets bogged down by its own overly righteous attempt to 'educate' – that sex is not gandi baat, ashleel aur aapattijanak (bad thing, obscene and unacceptable), nothing to be shameful about." Ronak Kotecha of The Times of India wrote, "In the past, we have seen films like 'Vicky Donor' and 'Shubh Mangal Savadhan' handle sensitive subjects (read sperm donation and erectile dysfunction) with class, tact and comedy. While this film's intent is bang on, what it really needed was a heavier dose of humour and entertainment".

=== Box office ===
Khandaani Shafakhana had the opening day collection of ₹75 lacs and the second day collection of ₹80 lacs, whereas the third day collection was ₹1.20 crore, taking its total opening weekend collection to ₹27.5 million.

As of 3 August 2019, with a gross of ₹3.27 crore in India and ₹0.71 crore overseas, the film has a worldwide gross collection of ₹39.8 million.
