= Abhijeet Bhattacharya =

Indian playback singer (born 1958)

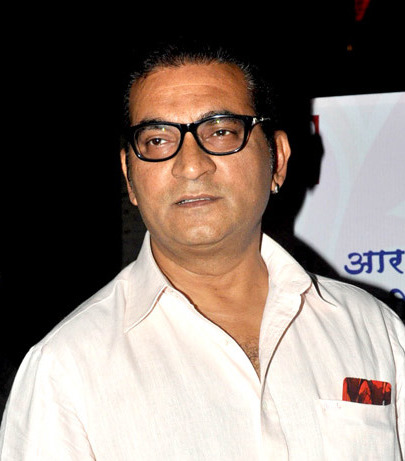
- Abhijeet Bhattacharya at launch Ravindra Jain's book Dil Ki Nazar Se in 2014

Background information
- Also known as: Voice of SRK, King of Melody, Baadshah of 1990s music
- Born: Abhijeet Bhattacharya; 30 October 1958 (age 68); Kanpur, Uttar Pradesh, India
- Genres: Filmi; Pop; Blues; Ghazals; Kishore Kumar Classics; Hindustani Classical; Patriotic; Rabindra Sangeet; Folk
- Occupations: Playback singer; Composer; Entrepreneur
- Instruments: Vocals, guitar, drums
- Years active: 1982–present
- Labels: Yash Raj Films, T-Series, Tips, Venus Records & Tapes, Red Chillies Entertainment, Sony Music, Zee Music, Saregama, Ishtar Music, Gramophone Company India, Eros International, SVF, Sony BMG, Times Music, B4U Music

Abhijeet Bhattacharya (born 30 October 1958), professionally known as Abhijeet, is an Indian playback singer who primarily sings in the Hindi film industry. As well as Hindi, he has sung in his native language Bengali and in other languages including Marathi, Nepali, Tamil, Bhojpuri, Punjabi, and Odia, in both West Bengal and Bangladesh.

== Early life ==
Abhijeet was born in Uttar Pradesh to a Kanpur-based Bengali Brahmin family the youngest of four to news editor Dheerendranath Bhattacharya and his wife Kamla Bhattacharya in Kanpur, Uttar Pradesh. He graduated in commerce (B.Com.) from Christ Church College, Kanpur in 1977. He started singing on stage from 1970. He left home in 1981 to pursue a career in singing in Bollywood.

== Career ==
=== Film music ===
He was launched by R. D. Burman in a Bengali film with a duet song with Asha Bhosle.He did stage shows as a singer with R. D. Burman in his starting career. He has been deeply influenced by the singer Kishore Kumar.

Movies he sang in 90's include Baadshah, Dilwale Dulhaniya Le Jayenge, Rakshak, Darr, Josh, Dhadkan, Raaz, Pyar To Hona Hi Tha, Khoobsurat, Na Tum Jano Na Hum, Kaho Na Pyar Hai, Tum Bin, Dillagi, Jodi No. 1. He was in Khiladi, Mr. and Mrs. Khiladi, Khiladi 420, Main Khiladi Tu Anari, Sabse Bada Khiladi, and Dhadkan.

His 2000s career included Red Chillies Entertainment's first film Phir Bhi Dil Hai Hindustani, Dhadkan, Josh, Asoka. Following with Dhoom's Dilbara ,Gangster's Lamha Lamha with Sunidhi Chauhan, Om Shanti Om's Dhoom Tana Na with Shreya Ghoshal. Later he sang for Ranbir Kapoor in film Besharam. The song was Dil ka jo haal hai with Shreya Ghoshal. In May 2019, Abhijeet Released Chakde Fatte which is the Cricket World Cup Song for 2019. The song was well appreciated by listeners. Many of his iconic songs are now being remade by new age composers, such as Tan Tana Tan from Judwaa 2, Ole Ole from Jawaani Jaaneman where the actor was himself Saif Ali Khan, Mai Khiladi Tu Anadi from Selfiee, Husnn Hai Suhana from Coolie No. 1, Sheher Ki Ladki from Khandaani Shafakhana and many more in the list. His Salman Khan duo famous song Chunnri Chunnri was recreated by famous South Korea band BTS in 2020 and it became very famous in reels from Instagram. In 2020 his first released song came for the Movie Shukranu, a 70s feel like song "Khwaab hai ya haqeqaat" duet with Indian Idol fame Krishnakali Saha released from Zee Music Company. In September 2021 Abhijeet is judged 'Sangeet er Moha Juddho', a reality show airing on Colours Bangla Channel along with other judges Jeet Ganguli, Ustad Rashid Khan.

=== Non-film music ===
In his early career he recorded an album with tribute songs to Kishore Kumar. The name of the album was A Tribute To Kishore Kumar, distributed by Gulshan Kumar and T-Series. His show was aired on Doordarshan was a massive famous among Indian homes which was a tribute to the legend Kishore Kumar. Playback singer Anuradha Paudwal also recorded duets opposite Abhijeet in some duet songs.

He released the Yaadein series where he sang many of the songs of Kishore Kumar along with singers Kumar Sanu and Vinod Rathod.

He has recorded many non-film pop music Albums. He released two albums, Main Deewana Hoon and Tapori No.1 in the early 1990s.He with other singers launched Dil Vil Pyar Vyar as a tribute to R. D. Burman and his compositions to Kishore Kumar. Other singers contributed including Kumar Sanu, Hariharan, Shaan and Kavita Krishnamurti. Later he launched Aashiqui.In early 2000s Abhijeet Bhattacharya released an album Salute To Legends singing the iconic songs of singers Manna Dey, Hemant Kumar, Kishore Kumar, Mukesh distributed by T-Series.In 2000s era he released pop albums like, Bandhan(Bengali), Tere Bina in (2003), Lamahe(2006) and Mai Deewana Hoo (2016). Tere Bina opened the career of Divya Khosla Kumar with the song Kabhi yaadon mein Aao.

=== Reality shows ===
Abhijeet was on the panel of judges of reality show Ek Se Badhkar Ek with choreographer Ahmed Khan anchor was Ravi Kishan in 2008 on Zee TV.The show was based on bringing several talents together. Abhijeet was on the panel of judges of Sa Re Ga Ma Pa Lil Champs in 2009 with music director, singer Bappi Lahiri and playback singer Alka Yagnik on Zee TV and anchor was Shaan. Abhijeet then was on judges panel with his Baaghi co-singer Kavita Krishnamurti on Zee Bangla TV for Saregamapa Lil Champs Bangla 2010.The reality show was based on the bringing talented singer kids from districts of WB.

His comeback as a judge was in 2020 with reality show SuperSinger on Star Jalsha. Then with Sangeeter Mahayuddho in 2021 on Colors Bangla channel.The other judges included singer Ustad Rashid Khan and Aashiqui 2 composer Jeet Ganguly.He attended as special guests in Indian Idol 2022, Saregamapa Zee TV on 2023.Recently attended Indian Idol 2024 on Sony TV in his honor of contribution in the Film Industry.

== Arrest and social media presence ==
On 6 May 2015, when sessions court in Mumbai sentenced actor Salman Khan to five years in jail in connection with the 2002 hit-and-run case, Abhijeet came out in support of Salman by tweeting "Roads are meant for cars and dogs, not for people sleeping on them." This raised anger among several Twitter users as well as in popular media for making insensitive remarks as well as opening himself to criticism by members of media or others that Abhijeet is equating homeless people with dogs.

Abhijeet said to a news channel, "Nobody should die on the roads as dogs." He further stated that the death of the poor man was a loss to his family members and by not sleeping on the roads such deaths can be and should be avoided. He said and so did other people on the same news channel program that sleeping on the roads/pavements is dangerous as the roads are extremely busy. Many members of the public and media want the government to do more to help avoid such preventable incidents. A large number of people sleep overnight on the roads in cities in India due to the lack of means to buy or rent a house while they eke out a living doing menial labor.

In July 2016, Abhijeet was arrested by the Mumbai police and released later on bail, for allegedly abusing journalist Swati Chaturvedi Online on Twitter. The arrest was at the complaint of Aam Aadmi Party spokesperson Preeti Sharma Menon with Mumbai's BKC Cyber Cell. According to the Indian Express, the FIR for the online abuse was filed on charges of public obscenity and outrage of modesty.

Abhijeet Bhattacharya's Twitter account (@abhijeetsinger) was suspended on 23 May 2017, after he posted a series of 'offensive tweets', especially against women. Sonu Nigam also deleted his account after Abhijeet's account was suspended.

On 29 May, Abhijeet re-joined Twitter with a new account(@singerabhijeet). But by evening, the new account was also suspended.

== Controversy ==
in 2018, He has been accused of sexual harassment and condemned for responding by saying "fat and ugly girls are blaming" him.

In 2022 he was arrested for harassing a woman

in 2025, Bhattacharya made comment on Mahatma Gandhi by referencing him as father of Pakistan.

== Discography ==
=== Hindi ===
==== Film Songs ====
Year	Film	Song	Music	Lyrics	Co-singer(s)	Note
1982	Situm	"Mumbai Konachi Re"	Jagjit Singh, Chitra Singh	Gulzar	Hariharan, Subhash Gill, Vinod Sehgal	
1983	Mujhe Insaaf Chahiye	"Premdoot Aaya"	Laxmikant–Pyarelal	Anand Bakshi	Asha Bhosle	
1983	Pyaar Bina Jag Soona	"Dil Daro Dilwalo"	Usha Khanna	NIda Fazil, Asad Bhopali, Abhilash	Asha Bhosle	
1984	Anand Aur Anand	"Nasha Hai Mujhe Bhi"	R. D. Burman	Anjaan	Kishore Kumar, Asha Bhosle	
1984	Anand Aur Anand	"Wadon Ki Sham Aai"	R. D. Burman	Anjaan	Lata Mangeshkar	
1984	Teri Baahon Mein	"ABCD..."	Bappi Lahiri	Amit Khanna	Sharon Prabhakar	
1985	Mujhe Kasam Hai	"Jaisa Hai Jo"	Ravindra Jain		Hemlata, Dilraj Kaur	
1989	Asmaan Se Ooncha	"Zindagi Se Jab Mile""	Rajesh Roshan	Indeevar	Kumar Sanu, Sadhna Sargam, Anwar, Sarika Kapoor	
1989	Goonj	"Jawani Ke Din Hai Pyar Kiye Ja"	Biddu	Biddu, Parvez Mehdi, Javed Siddiqui, Binjoo Ali, Rahi Masoom Raza, Ravindra Jain	Hema Sardesai, Binjoo Ali	
1989	Goonj	"Suta Lagao Yaro"	Biddu	Biddu, Parvez Mehdi, Javed Siddiqui, Binjoo Ali, Rahi Masoom Raza, Ravindra Jain	Binjoo Ali	
1990	Khatarnaak	"Aasman Pe Bethi Chandni"	Anu Malik	Indeevar, Sameer Anjaan		
1990	Baaghi	"Ek Chanchal Shook Haseena"	Anand–Milind	Sameer	Chorus	
1990	Baaghi	"Ek Chanchal Shook Haseena" (Version 2)	Anand–Milind	Sameer	Chorus	
1990	Baaghi	"Chandni Raat Hain"	Anand–Milind	Sameer	Kavita Krishnamurthy	
1990	Baaghi	"Har Kasam Se Badi Hain"	Anand–Milind	Sameer	Kavita Krishnamurthy	
1991	Dil Hai Ke Manta Nahin	"Dil Tujhpe Aa Gaya"	Nadeem–Shravan	Sameer	Anuradha Paudwal	
1991	Ramgarh Ke Sholay	"Shridevi Ji Bhaagyashri Ji"	Anu Malik	Dev Kohli		
1991	Indrajeet	"Reshmi Zulfen Nasheeli Aankhen"	R. D. Burman	Gulshan Bawra	Jolly Mukherjee	
1991	Dalapathi	"Aayi Holi"	Ilaiyaraaja	P. K. Mishra	Udit Narayan	
1991	Yaara Dildara	"Ab To Tumhe Hai Dikhana"	Jatin–Lalit	Majrooh Sultanpuri	Udit Narayan	
1991	Yaara Dildara	"Le Le De De Ka Police Mein Kya Kaam"	Jatin–Lalit	Majrooh Sultanpuri		
1992	Khiladi	"Wada Raha Sanam" (Duet)	Jatin–Lalit	Anwar Sagar	Alka Yagnik	
1992	Khiladi	"Wada Raha Sanam" (Male)	Jatin–Lalit	Anwar Sagar		
1992	Khiladi	"Khud Ko Kya Samajhti Hai"	Jatin–Lalit	Shyam Raj	Udit Narayan, Kavita Krishnamurthy, Sapna Mukherjee	
1992	Khiladi	"Kya Khabar Thi Jana"	Jatin–Lalit	Dev Kohli	Asha Bhosle	
1992	Khiladi	"Tu Shama Main Parwana Teraa"	Jatin–Lalit	Dev Kohli	Alisha Chinai	
1992	Khiladi	"Hoke Man Aaj Magan"	Jatin–Lalit	Mahendra Dehlvi	Asha Bhosle, Udit Narayan	
1992	Khiladi	"Hum Yaar Hain Yaaron Ke"	Jatin–Lalit	Mahendra Dehlvi	Udit Narayan	
1992	Khiladi	"Hum Yaar Hain Yaaron Ke" (Sad)	Jatin–Lalit	Mahendra Dehlvi		
1992	Shola Aur Shabnam	"Bole Bole Dil Mera Dole"	Bappi Lahiri	Anjaan	Chorus	
1993	Parampara	"Mere Saathiya" (Solo)	Shiv–Hari	Anand Bakshi		
1993	Parampara	"Mere Saathiya"	Shiv–Hari	Anand Bakshi		
1993	Parampara	"Phoolon Ke Is Shehar Mein"	Shiv–Hari	Anand Bakshi	Lata Mangeshkar	
1993	Darr	"Darwaza Band Karlo"	Shiv–Hari	Anand Bakshi	Lata Mangeshkar	
1993	Bhookamp	"Hai Usi Ki Duniya"	Jatin–Lalit	Dev Kohli		
1993	Boy Friend	"Keh Do Toh Sari Duniya Mein"	Jatin–Lalit	Mahendra Dehlvi	Alka Yagnik	
1993	Boy Friend	"Yeh Ghadi Yeh Pal Yeh Baatein"	Jatin–Lalit	Rani Malik	Kavita Krishnamurthy	
1993	Boy Friend	"Chehra Hai Lal Gulab Ke Hum Ko Loot Liya"	Jatin–Lalit	Hasrat Jaipuri	Kavita Krishnamurthy	
1993	Ashaant	"Tu Bhi Sharabi Main Bhi Sharabi"	Jatin–Lalit	Hasrat Jaipuri, Manohar Iyer, Madan Pal	Udit Narayan	
1993	Ashaant	"Hum To Sanam Sadiyon Se"	Jatin–Lalit	Hasrat Jaipuri, Manohar Iyer, Madan Pal	Kavita Krishnamurthy	
1993	Pehchaan	"Tu Mere Dil Mein"	Anand–Milind	Sameer		
1993	Pehchaan	"Aankhon Mein Kya"	Anand–Milind	Sameer	Kavita Krishnamurthy	
1993	Pehchaan	"Sanam O Sanam"	Anand–Milind	Sameer	Kavita Krishnamurthy	
1994	Yeh Dillagi	"Ole Ole"	Dilip Sen, Sameer Sen	Sameer		
1994	Yeh Dillagi	"Lagi Lagi Hai"	Dilip Sen, Sameer Sen	Sameer	Udit Narayan, Lata Mangeshkar	
1994	Hanste Khelte	"O Meri Rekha"	Jatin–Lalit	Manohar Iyer		
1994	Hanste Khelte	"Are Jaa Mujhe Na Sikha"	Jatin–Lalit	Manohar Iyer	Vijayta Pandit	
1994	Main Khiladi Tu Anari	"Main Khiladi Tu Anari"	Anu Malik	Maya Govind	Udit Narayan, Anu Malik	
1994	Raja Babu	"A Aa E Ee"	Anand–Milind	Sameer		
1994	Anjaam	"Badi Mushkil Hai"	Anand–Milind	Sameer		
1994	Teesra Kaun	"Teesra Kaun"	Anand–Milind	Sameer	Poornima	
1994	Teesra Kaun	"Kya Aankhen Hain"	Anand–Milind	Sameer	Alka Yagnik	
1994	Teesra Kaun	"Humein Tumse Pyar Tha"	Anand–Milind	Sameer	Sadhana Sargam	
1994	Juaari	"Haara Khiladi Jeet Gaye Hum"	Bappi Lahiri	Anwar Sagar	Sudesh Bhosle, Kavita Krishnamurthy, Pritha Mazumdar	
1994	Juaari	"Tum Hi Tum Ho"	Bappi Lahiri	Anwar Sagar		
1994	Laqshya	"Pyar Karte Hain Hum"	Jatin–Lalit	Rani Malik	Alka Yagnik	
1994	Laqshya	"Raftaar Hai Zindagi Ki"	Jatin–Lalit	Majrooh Sultanpuri	Jatin Pandit, Udit Narayan	
1995	Dilwale Dulhaniya Le Jayenge	"Zara Sa Jhoom Loon Mein"	Jatin–Lalit	Anand Bakshi	Asha Bhosle	
1995	Sabse Bada Khiladi	"Bharo Meri Mang Baro"	Rajesh Roshan	Dev Kohli	Sadhna Sargam	
1995	Sabse Bada Khiladi	"Tu Hai Aandhi"	Rajesh Roshan	Dev Kohli	Jyoti	
1995	Coolie No. 1	"Goriya Chura Na"	Anand–Milind	Sameer	Chandana Dixit	
1995	Takkar	"Aankhon Main Base Ho Tum"	Anu Malik	Maya Govind	Alka Yagnik	
1996	Fareb	"Yeh Teri Aankhen"	Jatin–Lalit	Indeevar		
1996	Fareb	"Yaar Ka Milna"	Jatin–Lalit	Indeevar	Udit Narayan	
1996	Khiladiyon Ka Khiladi	"Itna Mujhe Pata Hai"	Anu Malik	Dev Kohli	Kavita Krishnamurthy	
1996	Jung	"Deewana Deewana Yeh Dil"	Nadeem–Shravan	Anand Bakshi	Kavita Krishnamurthy	
1996	Rakshak	"Shehar Ki Ladki"	Anand–Milind	Deepak Chaudhary	Chandana Dixit	
1996	Insaaf	"Baraana De"	Anand–Milind	Sameer		
1996	Insaaf	"Tana Tandana"	Anand–Milind	Sameer	Poornima	
1996	Ek Tha Raja	"Saawan Ki Raaton Mein"	Anand–Milind	Sameer	Kavita Krishnamurthy	
1996	Zameer	"Goriyaan Tu"	Anand–Milind	Sameer	Poornima	
1996	Army	"De Taali"	Anand–Milind	Sameer	Vinod Rathod, Jolly Mukherjee, Sadhana Sargam	
1996	Army	"Ho Gayee Tiyar Hamari Army"	Anand–Milind	Sameer	Vinod Rathod, Jolly Mukherjee, Alka Yagnik	
1996	Krishna	"Jhanjhriya" (Male)	Anu Malik	Anand Raaj Anand		
1996	Krishna	"Darwaze Pe Tere Baarat"	Anu Malik	Nida Fazli		
1996	Krishna	"Darwaze Pe Tere Baarat" (Sad)	Anu Malik	Nida Fazli		
1996	Daraar	"Deewana Deewana"	Anu Malik	Rahat Indori	Sadhana Sargam	
1996	Daraar	"Yeh Pyaar Pyaar Kya Hai"	Anu Malik	Rahat Indori	Kavita Krishnamurthy	
1996	Dastak	"Tumhain Kaise" (Slow)	Rajesh Roshan	Javed Akhtar		
1996	Dastak	"Tumhain Kaise" (Fast)	Rajesh Roshan	Javed Akhtar		
1996	Return of Jewel Thief	"Aa Meri Janam"	Jatin–Lalit	Anand Bakshi	Alka Yagnik	
1996	Return of Jewel Thief	"Aaj Ka Din"	Jatin–Lalit	Anand Bakshi	Kumar Sanu	
1997	Judwaa	"Tan Tana Tan Tan Tara"	Anu Malik	Dev Kohli	Poornima	
1997	Mohabbat	"O Baby Dont Break My Heart"	Nadeem–Shravan	Sameer	Kavita Krishnamurthy	
1997	Mohabbat	"Main Hoon Akela"	Nadeem–Shravan	Sameer	Kavita Krishnamurthy	
1997	Gundagardi	"Aankhon Hi"	Jatin–Lalit	Dev Kohli	Sadhana Sargam	
1997	Yes Boss	"Chaand Taare"	Jatin–Lalit	Javed Akhtar		
1997	Yes Boss	"Suniye To"	Jatin–Lalit	Javed Akhtar		
1997	Yes Boss	Jaata Hai Tu Kahan"	Jatin–Lalit	Javed Akhtar		
1997	Yes Boss	"Main Koi Aisa Geet Gaoon"	Jatin–Lalit	Javed Akhtar	Alka Yagnik	
1997	Daava	"Humse Hai Yaaro"	Jatin–Lalit	Vinod Mahendra	Kumar Sanu	
1997	Judaai	"Mujhe Pyaar Hua"	Nadeem–Shravan	Sameer	Alka Yagnik	
1997	Judaai	"Main Tujhse Aisi Milon"	Nadeem–Shravan	Sameer	Alka Yagnik	
1997	Judaai	"Oee Baba"	Nadeem–Shravan	Sameer	Alka Yagnik, Sapna Mukherjee	
1997	Bhai	"Khul Gaya Naseeb",	Anand–Milind	Sameer	Chandana Dixit, Aditya Narayan	
1997	Bhai	"Mujhe Ekraar"	Anand–Milind	Sameer	Poornima	
1997	Sanam	"Kasam Se Kasam Se"	Anand–Milind	Sameer	Kavita Krishnamurthy	
1997	Daanveer	"Chumma Chumma"	Anand–Milind	Sameer	Chandana Dixit	
1997	Virasat	"Jayengi Pi Ke Nagar"	Anu Malik	Javed Akhtar	Anuradha Sriram	
1997	Ek Phool Teen Kante	"Yeh Ladki Badi"	Jatin–Lalit	Nawab Arzoo	Alka Yagnik	
1997	Mr. and Mrs. Khiladi	"Jumme Ke Jumme",	Anu Malik	Hasrat Jaipuri	Poornima	
1997	Mr. and Mrs. Khiladi	"Samosa Main Aloo"	Anu Malik	Dev Kohli	Poornima, Sapna Mukherjee	
1998	Kudrat	"Aab Tak Hai Puri Azadi"	Rajesh Roshan	Dev Kohli	Poornima	
1998	Kudrat	"Tujhe Dene Ko"	Rajesh Roshan	Indeevar	Kavita Krishnamurthy	
1998	Keemat	"Koi Nahin Tere Jaise"	Rajesh Roshan	Indeevar	Udit Narayan, Hema Sardesai	
1998	Bada Din	"Betaab Hum Awaara Hum"	Jatin–Lalit	Javed Akhtar		
1998	Saazish	"Khushi Ka Rang"	Jatin–Lalit	Vinod Mahendra	Kavita Krishnamurthy, Bali Brahmbhatt	
1998	Pyaar To Hona Hi Tha	"Aaj Hai Sagaai"	Jatin–Lalit	Sameer	Alka Yagnik	
1998	Dhoondte Reh Jaaoge!	"Jaaneman Jo Hua"	Jatin–Lalit	Majrooh Sultanpuri	Udit Narayan, Alka Yagnik	
1999	Pyaar Koi Khel Nahin	"Ladke Ne Ladki"	Jatin–Lalit	Majrooh Sultanpuri		
1999	Baadshah	"Woh Ladki Jo"	Anu Malik	Javed Akhtar		
1999	Baadshah	"Baadshah O Baadshah"	Anu Malik	Sameer		
1999	Baadshah	"Main Toh Hu Paagal"	Anu Malik	Sameer	Shah Rukh Khan	
1999	Baadshah	"Mohabbat Ho Gayee Hai"	Anu Malik	Sameer	Alka Yagnik	
1999	Baadshah	"Hum To Deewaney Huye Yaar"	Anu Malik	Sameer	Alka Yagnik	
1999	Dil Hi Dil Mein	"Ae Nazneen Sunona"	A. R. Rahman	Mehboob Kotwal		Hindi dub of Kadhalar Dhinam
1999	Biwi No.1	"Chunnari Chunnari"	Anu Malik	Sameer	Anuradha Sriram	
1999	Biwi No.1	"Mujhe Maaf Karna"	Anu Malik	Sameer	Alka Yagnik, Aditya Narayan, Anmol Malik	
1999	Biwi No.1	"Biwi No.1"	Anu Malik	Dev Kohli	Poornima	
1999	Khoobsurat	"Bahoot Khoobsurat Ho"	Jatin–Lalit	Gulzar	Neerja Pandit	
1999	Khoobsurat	"Azmale Ye Formule"	Jatin–Lalit	Gulzar	Sharddha Pandit	
1999	Dil Kya Kare	"Badal Bijli"	Jatin–Lalit	Anand Bakshi		
1999	Dil Kya Kare	"Rang Lage Lo"	Jatin–Lalit	Anand Bakshi		
1999	Dil Kya Kare	"Monday Bhi Ho Sunday"	Jatin–Lalit	Anand Bakshi		
1999	Dillagi	"Dillagi Dillagi"	Jatin–Lalit	Javed Akhtar	Kavita Krishnamurthy, Alka Yagnik, Udit Narayan, Sonu Nigam, Sukhwinder Singh, Shankar Mahadevan, Shaan, Jaspinder Narula, Mahalaxmi Iyer	
1999	Yeh Hai Mumbai Meri Jaan	"Tu Bada Gazab Ka Yaar Hai"	Jatin–Lalit	Indeevar	Sonu Nigam, Kavita Krishnamurthy	
2000	Phir Bhi Dil Hai Hindustani	"I'm The Best" (Male)	Jatin–Lalit	Javed Akhtar		
2000	Phir Bhi Dil Hai Hindustani	"Kuch To Bata"	Jatin–Lalit	Javed Akhtar	Alka Yagnik	
2000	Phir Bhi Dil Hai Hindustani	"Aur Kya"	Jatin–Lalit	Javed Akhtar	Alka Yagnik	
2000	Raju Chacha	"Aaj Ka Kya Program Hai"	Jatin–Lalit	Anand Bakshi	Kavita Krishnamurthy, Sudesh Bhosale	
2000	Hera Pheri	"Main Ladki Pom Pom"	Anu Malik	Sameer	Kavita Krishnamurthy, Vinod Rathod, Hariharan	
2000	Hera Pheri	"Denewala Jab Bhi Deta"	Anu Malik	Sameer		
2000	Hera Pheri	"Humba Leela"	Anu Malik	Sameer		
2000	Chal Mere Bhai	"Mere Baap Ki"	Anand–Milind	Nitin Raikwar	Vinod Rathod	
2000	Chal Mere Bhai	"Chori Chori Sapno Mein"	Anand–Milind	Sameer	Alka Yagnik	
2000	Chal Mere Bhai	"Chori Chori Sapno Mein" (Sad)	Anand–Milind	Sameer	Alka Yagnik	
2000	Josh	"Mere Khyaloon Ki Malika",	Anu Malik	Sameer		
2000	Josh	"Zinda Hai Hum Toh"	Anu Malik	Nitin Raikwar	Jolly Mukherjee, Hema Sardesai	
2000	Dhadkan	"Tum Dil Ki Dhadkan"	Nadeem–Shravan	Sameer	Alka Yagnik	
2000	Raja Ko Rani Se Pyar Ho Gaya	"Dost Hamare"	Jatin–Lalit	Javed Akhtar		
2000	Khiladi 420	"Dil Le Le"	Sanjeev–Darshan	Sameer	Alka Yagnik	
2001	Asoka	"Roshini Se"	Anu Malik	Gulzar	Alka Yagnik	
2001	Asoka	"Raat Ka Nasha"	Anu Malik	Gulzar	K.S. Chithra, chorus	
2001	Tum Bin	"Dekhte Hi Dekhte"	Nikhil–Vinay	Faaiz Anwar	Anuradha Paudwal	
2001	Tum Bin	"Pyar Humko Hone Laga"	Nikhil–Vinay	Faaiz Anwar	K.S. Chithra	
2001	Nayak: The Real Hero	"Chidiya Tu Hoti Toh"	A. R. Rahman	Anand Bakshi	Sanjivani Bhelande	
2001	Grahan	"Kehte Hain Jisko Mohabbat"	Karthik Raja	Mehboob Kotwal	Kavita Krishnamurthy	
2001	Grahan	"Chup Chup Chup Chup"	Karthik Raja	Mehboob Kotwal	Asha Bhosle	
2001	Style	"Mohabbat Ho Na Jaye"	Sanjeev–Darshan	Abbas Katka	Hema Sardesai, Udit Narayan	
2002	Raaz	"Pyaar Se Pyaar Hum",	Nadeem–Shravan	Sameer		
2002	Raaz	"Main Agar Samne"	Nadeem–Shravan	Sameer	Alka Yagnik	
2002	Awara Paagal Deewana	"Maine To Khai Kasam"	Anu Malik	Sameer	Sunidhi Chauhan	
2002	Om Jai Jagadish	"Om Jai Jagadish"	Anu Malik	Sameer	Alka Yagnik, Hariharan, Shaan	
2002	Om Jai Jagadish	"Love Story"	Anu Malik	Sameer	Shaan, Kavita Krishnamurthy	
2002	Yeh Teraa Ghar Yeh Meraa Ghar	"Hasate Ho"	Anand–Milind	Ibrahim Ashq	Alka Yagnik	
2002	Aap Mujhe Achche Lagne Lage	"Aap Mujhe Achche Lagne Lage"	Rajesh Roshan	Ibrahim Ashq	Alka Yagnik	
2002	Aap Mujhe Achche Lagne Lage	"Tum To Sagar Jaise"	Rajesh Roshan	Ibrahim Ashq	Alka Yagnik	Song not included in the film
2002	Na Tum Jaano Na Hum	"Hai Ram Ye Kya Kar Daala"	Rajesh Roshan	Anand Bakshi	Pamela Jain	Song not included in the film
2002	Na Tum Jaano Na Hum	"Hai Ram Ye Kya Kar Daala" – II	Rajesh Roshan	Anand Bakshi	Pamela Jain	Song not included in the film
2002	Dil Vil Pyar Vyar	"Barsaat Bhi Aakar"	R. D. Burman, Babloo Chakravarty	Rajendra Krishan		
2002	Dil Vil Pyar Vyar	"O Haseena Zulfonwali"	R. D. Burman, Babloo Chakravarty	Majrooh Sultanpuri	Sunidhi Chauhan	
2002	Dil Vil Pyar Vyar	"Yeh Jo Mohabbat Hai"	R. D. Burman, Babloo Chakravarty	Anand Bakshi	Hariharan, Babul Supriyo	
2002	Tum Jiyo Hazaron Saal	"Lippo Ram" (Male)	Jatin–Lalit	K.K. Verma		
2002	Waah! Tera Kya Kehna	"Karele Ki Shaadi"	Jatin–Lalit	Sameer		
2003	Chalte Chalte	"Chalte Chalte",	Jatin–Lalit	Javed Akhtar	Alka Yagnik	
2003	Chalte Chalte	"Tauba Tumhare, Yeh Ishaare"	Jatin–Lalit	Javed Akhtar	Alka Yagnik	
2003	Chalte Chalte	"Suno Na Suno Na",	Aadesh Shrivastava	Javed Akhtar		
2003	Haasil	"Aankhen Bhi Hoti Hai Dil Ki Zubaan"	Jatin–Lalit	Israr Ansari		
2003	Qayamat: City Under Threat	"Dil Chura Liya"	Nadeem–Shravan	Sameer	Kavita Krishnamurthy	
2003	Qayamat: City Under Threat	"Aitbaar Nahi Karna"	Nadeem–Shravan	Sameer	Sadhana Sargam	
2003	Qayamat: City Under Threat	"Yaar Pyaar Ho Gaya"	Nadeem–Shravan	Sameer	Alisha Chinai	
2003	Qayamat: City Under Threat	"Aitbaar Nahi Karna" (Solo)	Nadeem–Shravan	Sameer		
2004	Main Hoon Na	"Main Hoon Na" (Sad)	Anu Malik	Javed Akhtar		
2004	Main Hoon Na	"Tumhe Jo Maine Dekha"	Anu Malik	Javed Akhtar	Shreya Ghoshal	
2004	Rok Sako To Rok Lo	"Yaaron Sun Lo"	Jatin–Lalit	Prasoon Joshi		
2004	Rok Sako To Rok Lo	"Yaaron Sun Lo" (Sad)	Jatin–Lalit	Prasoon Joshi		
2004	Aetbaar	"Aetbaar"	Rajesh Roshan	Dev Kohli	Alka Yagnik	
2004	Phir Milenge	"Yaad Hai Woh Pehli Mulaqat"	Shankar–Ehsaan–Loy	Sameer		Song not included in the film
2004	Dhoom	"Dilbara"	Pritam	Sameer	Sowmya Raoh	
2005	Bewafaa	"Ishq Chupta Nahin"	Nadeem–Shravan	Sameer		
2005	Dosti	"Dulhania"	Nadeem–Shravan	Sameer	Kunal Ganjawala, Alka Yagnik	
2005	Dosti	"Aisa Koi Zindagi Mein"	Nadeem–Shravan	Sameer	Alka Yagnik	
2005	Dosti	"Yaar Di Shaadi"	Nadeem–Shravan	Sameer	Sonu Nigam, Alka Yagnik, Sarika Kapoor	
2005	Pyaar Mein Twist	"Pal Tham Gaya Hai"	Jatin–Lalit	Sameer	Alka Yagnik	
2005	Pyaar Mein Twist	"Pal Tham Gaya Hai" (Remix)	Jatin–Lalit	Sameer	Alka Yagnik	
2005	Page 3	"Huzzor-E-Ala"	Shamir Tandon	Sandeep Nath	Asha Bhosle	Bonus Track
2005	Shaadi No. 1	"Chand Ko Tod Doonga"	Anu Malik	Sameer	Anuradha Sriram	
2006	Gangster	"Lamha Lamha"	Pritam	Neelesh Misra		
2006	Gangster	"Lamha Lamha" (Duet)	Pritam	Neelesh Misra	Sunidhi Chauhan	
2006	Mera Dil Leke Dekho	"Mera Dil Leke Dekhko (Title Track)"	Jatin–Lalit	Sameer	Alka Yagnik	
2006	Mera Dil Leke Dekho	"Woh Aanewali Hai"	Jatin–Lalit	Sameer		
2007	Kaafila	"Aayi Hai Hawa"	Sukhwinder Singh	Babu Singh Maan	Sukhwinder Singh, Nabi Madjnun	
2007	Kaafila	"Kabhi Kabhi Sapne"	Sukhwinder Singh	Babu Singh Maan	Sukhwinder Singh, Mohammed Aziz, Gurusewak Mann	
2007	Kaafila	"Hatho Mein Hath"	Sukhwinder Singh	Babu Singh Maan	Sukhwinder Singh	
2007	Om Shanti Om	"Dhoom Taana"	Vishal–Shekhar	Javed Akhtar	Shreya Ghoshal	
2008	Shaurya	"Dosti Kya Hai"	Adnan Sami	Javed Akhtar	Udit Narayan	
2009	Billu	"Khudaya Khair" (Reprise)	Pritam	Gulzar	Akriti Kakar	
2009	Ek: The Power of One	"Tum Sath Ho"	Pritam	Shabbir Ahmed	Shreya Ghoshal	
2011	Tum Hi To Ho	"Tum Hi To Ho"	Anand–Milind	Ravi Chopra		
2013	Besharam	"Dil Ka Jo Haal Hai"	Lalit Pandit	Rajeev Barnwal	Shreya Ghoshal	
2013	Besharam	"Dil Kaa Jo Haal Hai" (Remix)	Lalit Pandit	Rajeev Barnwal	Shreya Ghoshal	
2016	Mahayoddha Rama	"Chalo Banao Setu"	Aadesh Shrivastava	Javed Akhtar	Shukhwinder Singh, Aadesh Shrivastava, Krishna & Vijayta Pandit	
2018	Auto Romance in Mumbai	"Kabhi Toh Lagta Hai Koi Hame Chahe"	Sidharrth Jaaju			
2019	Khandaani Shafakhana	"Shehar Ki Ladki"	Tanishk Bagchi, Anand–Milind	Tanishk Bagchi, Deepak Chaudhary	Badshah, Tulsi Kumar, Chandana Dixit	
2019	Bhagya Vidhata	"Dil Mile Mile",	Dilip Sen, Sameer Sen	M.Prakash	Kavita Krishnamurthy	
2019	Bhagya Vidhata	"Pyar Ke Safar Mein"	Dilip Sen, Sameer Sen	M.Prakash	Sabita Mahapatra	
2020	Shukranu	"Khwaab Hai Ya Haqeqaat"	Sanjay–Jaydip	Yash Eshwari	Krishnakali Saha	
2020	Coolie No. 1	"Husnn Hai Suhaana New"	Tanishk Bagchi, Anand–Milind	Sameer Anjaan	Chandana Dixit	
2022	Indian Never Again Nirbhaya	"Tum Jo Mere"	Rupesh Verma	Ajay Garg	Anita Bhatt	
2022	Super Dhamaal.Com	"Dono Palko Pe Boonde"	Siddhant Madhav	Junaid Wasi		
2022	Love You Loktantra	"Chal Nikla Ek Vakil... Saari Duniya"	Lalit Pandit	Gurunath Pandit		
2023	Selfiee	"Main Khiladi 2.0"	Anu Malik, Tanishk Bagchi	Maya Govind	Udit Narayan	
2023	The Purvanchal Files	"440 Watt"	Somen Kutty Sarkar	Sandeep Nath	Shagun Gupta	

==== Non-film songs ====
Year	Title	Song	Music	Co-singer(s)	Note
2016	Bollywood Theme Song for World Cultural Festival	"Bollywood Theme Song for World Cultural Festival"	Lalit Pandit	Asha Bhosle, Alka Yagnik, Javed Ali, Shaan, Akriti Kakkar, Kanika Kapoor	
2016	Pyaasi Pyaasi	"Pyaasi Pyaasi"	Abhishek Ray	Shreya Ghoshal	
2016	Pyaasi Pyaasi	"Pyaasi Pyaasi" (Duet)	Abhishek Ray	Shreya Ghoshal	
2017	Dhadkan Unplugged	"Tum Dil Ki Dhadkan"	Nadeem–Shravan	Jolly Das	
2017	Mothers Day Special Song	"Maa Ka Pyar"	GS Gupta, PS Kainth	GS Gupta & PS Kainth	
2018	Suno Watan Ke Navjawano (Republic Day Song 2018)	"Suno Watan Ke Navjawano"	Vitthal Patole		
2018	Aye Zindagi – Single	"Aye Zindagi"	Vishal Mishra		
2019	Jeet Ke Lana Hai – World Cup Song 2019	"Jeet Ke Lana Hai"	Vitthal Patole		
2019	Cheers to Team India	"Cheers!! to Team India"	Abhijeet Bhattacharya		Motivational single
2019	Papa Bandook Dila Do	"Papa Bandook Dila Do"	Abhijeet Bhattacharya		Tribute to 20 years of Kargil
2019	Flames Season 2	"Thame Dil Ko"	Lalit Pandit		web show

=== Bengali ===
==== Film songs ====
Year	Film	Song	Music	Lyrics	Co-singer(s)	Note
1982	Aparupa	"Ami Janina Keno Tomay"	R. D. Burman	Gauri Prasanna Mazumder	Asha Bhosle	
1987	Guru Dakshina	"Aaj E Probhate"	Bappi Lahiri	Bhabesh Kundu	Bhupinder Singh	
1987	Pratikar	"Dol Dolo Dol"	Bappi Lahiri	Gauri Prasanna Mazumder	Chandrani Mukherjee, Md Aziz	
1992	Maa	"Chal Ghare Dhuke"	R. D. Burman	Swapan Chakraborty	Asha Bhosle	
2011	Bhorer Alo	"More Piya Piya More Saiyan"	Jeet Gannguli	Priyo Chattopadhyay	Mahalakshmi Iyer	
2012	Challenge 2	"Police Chorer Preme Poreche"	Jeet Gannguli	Raja Chanda	Akriti Kakkar	
2012	Challenge 2	"Elo Je Maa"	Jeet Gannguli	Priyo Chattopadhyay, Raja Chanda	Shreya Ghoshal	
2013	Khoka 420	"Gobhir Joler Fish"	Savvy		Akriti Kakkar	
2013	Khoka 420	"Jay Govinda Jay Gopala"	Rishi Chanda	Priyo Chattopadhyay	Mahalakshmi Iyer	
2015	Jamai Baron	"Adho Alo Chaya"	Sumit Acharya			
2017	Hason Raja	"Matiro Pinjirar Majhe Bondi Hoiya Re"	Bappi Lahiri, Debojyoti Mishra	Hason Raja		Bangladeshi film
2017	Love 16	"Kalo Shey Dhushor"	Sarbarish Majumder		Sureli Roy	
2018	Bhaijaan Elo Re	"Bhaijaan Elo Re (Title Track)"	Savvy	Rajiv Dutta		
2018	Hoichoi Unlimited	"Sujon Majhi Re"	Savvy	Raja Chanda		
2024	Shontaan	"Pablo"	Jeet Gannguli	Anindya Chatterjee		

==== Non-film songs ====
Year	Title	Song	Music	Co-singer(s)
2017	Dhai Kurakur Dham Kurakur (Pujo Special Singles 2017)	"Dhai Kurakur Dham Kurakur"	Shubhashis Bhattacharya	
2018	Bengali Puja Song 2018	"Joy Joy Durga Maa – The Pujo Song"	Jeet Gannguli	Shaan, Jeet Gannguli
2019	Tumi Achho Tai	"Aloor Chithi"	Jeet–Ankit	Shikha
2020	Sree Bhumi Puja Theme Song 2020	"Pujo Elo Elo Pujo"	Goutam Das	Dipanwita Choudhury
2021	Sree Bhumi Puja Theme Song 2021	"Maago Tomar Agomone"	Jeet Gannguli	
2021	Ki Je Holo Ta Janina	"Ki Je Holo Ta Janina"	Raja Nag	

=== Tamil songs ===
Year	Film	Song	Music	Co-singer(s)
2001	Samrat Asoka (Tamil dubbed version of Asoka)	"Thaanguma Kanaakalin" (Duet)	Anu Malik	K. S. Chithra, Zubeen Garg
2001	Samrat Asoka (Tamil dubbed version of Asoka)	"Mogathile Kannirandum"	Anu Malik	Sadhana Sargam,

=== Nepali Songs ===
Year	Film	Song	Music	Co-singer(s)
2017	Radhe	"Malai Maaf Gara"	Arjun Pokhrel	
2023	Revive	"Mann Bhaye Pirati"	Krish Rijal	Alka Yagnik

=== Odia songs ===
Year	Film	Song	Music	Co-singer(s)
2019	Babu Bhaijaan - The Real Story	"Humdum Mere"	Malay Mishra	Ira Mohanty
2021	Jayveer	"To Premare Padigali Ki"	Japani Bhai	Jyotirmayee
2021	Barsha Rani Ra Gelhi Jhia	"Barsha Rani Ra Gelhi Jhia"	Chinmay Dash & Bibhun	Jyotirmayee Nayak

== Accolades ==
Honours

- MTV ASIA Award (2004)
- Uttar Pradesh Gaurav Samman
- Yash Bharati Samman (2013)
- Sangeet Maha Samman (2015)
- Vishesh Shamman Award by West Bengal Government (2017)
- Vikramaditya Award (2018)
- Banga Bibhushan (2022)

Filmfare Awards

Win

Filmfare Award for Best Male Playback Singer

Year	Song	Film	Music director(s)
1998	"Main Koi Aisa Geet Gaaon"	Yes Boss	Jatin–Lalit

- Screen Award for Best Male Playback in 1998 for "Main Koi Aisa Geet" from Yes Boss

Nomination

1995 – Best Male Playback Singer for "Wada Raha Sanam" from (Khiladi)

1995 – Best Male Playback Singer for "Ole Ole" from (Yeh Dillagi)

1997 – Best Male Playback Singer for "Yeh Teri Aankhen Jhuki Jhuki" from (Fareb)

2004 – Best Male Playback Singer for "Suno Na" from (Chalte Chalte)
