= List of Gujarati films of 2022 =

List of Gujarati language films released in 2022

This is a list of Gujarati language films that were released in 2022. The Gujarati films collectively grossed ₹56 crore (US$5.9 million) in 2022, according to Ormax Box Office Report.

== January - March ==
Opening	Name	Genre	Director	Cast	Ref.
14 January	Hu Chhu Ne	Action drama romance	Harshad Kandoliya	Jignesh Kaviraj Barot, Rohit Thakore, Shreya Dave, Prinal Oberoi	
21 January	Chaahat	Drama	Ritesh Mokasana	Hasmukh Bhavsar, Nirav Kalal, Rajesh Thakkar, Parth Modi	
21 January	Rangilo Rasikalal	Comedy drama	Nilesh Mehta	Yamini Joshi, Samarth Sharma	
4 February	Blind Dates	Drama thriller	Akhil Kotak	Akhil Kotak, Pravin Padhariya, Ankita Dudhaiya, Dimple Patel	
11 February	Dhummas	Romance thriller	Kartavya Shah	Jayesh More, Kinjal Rajpriya, Ojas Rawal, Chetan Daiya	
18 February	Baap No Bagicho	Comedy drama	Bhagwan Vaghela	Ravi Kishan, Sanjay Goradia, Mustak Khan, Asrani	
18 February	Thank You Boss	Comedy drama	Deepak Antani	Hitu Kanodia, Jitu Pandya	
25 February	Tu Adhuri Vartano Chhedo	Masala	Annu Patel	Vikram Thakor, Neha Suthar, Prakash Mandora, Parth Parmar, Jignesh Modi, Dhansukh Bhanderi	
4 March	Dear Father	Comedy drama	Umang Vyas	Chetan Dhanani, Paresh Rawal, Manasi Parekh	
4 March	Jhalahalati Savaar	Social Satire	Samir Devaliya	Kalpesh Rajgor, Devanshee vyas, Pradeep Solanki, Rashmi Patel	
11 March	Prem Prakaran	Romance	Chandresh Bhatt	Gaurav Paswala, Deeksha Joshi, Esha Kansara	

== April - June ==
Opening	Name	Genre	Director	Cast	Ref.
1 April	Raktbeej	Thriller	Hardeek Pareek	Denisha Ghumra, Nisarg Trivedi, Nakshraj, Nishcay Rana, Tarjeeni Bhadla, Aakansha Panchal, Navid Kadri, Kaushambi Bhatt	
7 April	Gajab Thai Gayo!	Science fiction, children, comedy	Neeraj Joshi	Malhar Thakar, Pooja Jhaveri, Ujjwal Chopra	
22 April	Petipack	Comedy drama	K. R. Devmani	Dhvanit Thaker, Monal Gajjar, Manoj Joshi, Smita Jaykar, Kumkum Das, Hemang Dave	
22 April	Aasha	Drama	Ashok Karlekar	Vimmy Bhatt, Nisarg Trivedi, Haresh Dagiya, Mukesh Rao, Vidhi Shah, Jignesh Modi, Yamini Joshi, Neel Soni	
6 May	Nayika Devi: The Warrior Queen	Historical fiction	Nitin G	Khushi Shah, Chunky Panday, Manoj Joshi, Jayesh More, Chirag Jani, Ojas Rawal, Kaushambi Bhatt, Mamta Soni, Chetan Daiya, Binda Rawal, Brinda Trivedi, Ragi Jani, Mustafa Askari, Morli Patel, Aakash Zala, Hari Rathod, Anuresh Ninad, Vinayak Ketkar, Aayush Jadeja	
6 May	Kehvatlal Parivar	Comedy	Vipul Mehta	Siddharth Randeria, Supriya Pathak, Vandana Pathak, Bhavya Gandhi, Sanjay Goradia, Shraddha Dangar, Neel Gagdani, Dharmesh Vyas, Aakash Zala, Meghana Solanki	
6 May	Vidya	Drama	Raj Irani	Neha Joshi, Twishaa Bhatt	
13 May	Adko Dadko	Comedy	Sunnykumar	Sanjay Chauhan, Akshat Irani, Firoz Irani, Maulika Patel, Aanchal Shah, Ragi Jani, Anurag Prapanna, Smita Jaykar, Hemang Dave, Chetan Daiya, Jitu Pandya, Aakash Zala	
13 May	Listen 2 Dil	Comedy drama	Vijay Dalwadi	Dhaval Goswami, Raviraa Bhardwaj	
13 May	Family	Drama	Parag Pimplay	Satyen Verma, Neha Joshi	
19 May	Sonu Tane Mara Par Bharoso Nai Ke	Comedy	Henil Gandhi	Malhar Thakar, Nijal Modi, Ragi Jani, Kalpana Gagdekar, Nilesh Pandya, Meghana Solanki, Jayesh More	
20 May	Mrugtrushna	Children, adventure drama	Darshan Ashwin Trivedi	Aryan Sagar, Nishma Soni, Happy Bhavsar, Jayesh More, Ragi Jani, Sharvary Joshi, Khush Tahil Ramani, Karan Patel	
27 May	Dear Love	Romantic comedy drama	Viral Patel	Hetansh Shah, Vidhi Shah, Krrish Chauhan, Aviraj Mangrola, Vidhi Patel, Nidhi Rathod, Saloni Jivani, Nidhi Dave, Shyam Sir, Kajal Mehta	
27 May	Rocky In Risk	Action	Alok Thaker, Nivedita Shah	Alok Thaker, Nivedita Shah, Bobby Makwana	
3 June	Jaysuk Zdpayo	Comedy	Dharmessh Mehta	Johnny Lever, Jimit Trivedi, Puja Joshi, Anang Desai, Hardik Sangani	
9 June	Jiti Le Jindagi	Family drama	Vipul Sharma	Kalpesh Patel, Jaimini Trivedi, Ragi Jani, Jay Pandya, Urvashi Harsora, Kartik Rashtrapal, Shivani Bhatt	
10 June	Ghantadi	Comedy drama	K. K. Makwana	Prem Gadhavi, Smit Pandya, Hemang Dave, Akshatt Irani	
17 June	Naadi Dosh	Romance	Krishnadev Yagnik	Yash Soni, Janki Bodiwala, Raunaq Kamdar	
17 June	Love You Pappa	Drama	Akhil Kotak	Akhil Kotak, Prapti Ajwalia, Jitendra Thakkar, Bhavik Jagad	
17 June	Parichay	Action, drama, crime	Shravan Kumar	Zakir Hussain, Raza Murad, Nisarg Trivedi, Bhavini Jani	
24 June	Hello Zindagi	Masala	Rajan Rathod	Viveka Patel, Rajan Rathod, Jitendra Thakkar	
24 June	Raaji Always Khush	Family drama	Ramesh Karolkar	Gopi Desai, Parth Modi, Mangal Desai, Prachi Patel	
29 June	Har Re Janamma... Mangu Tane	Drama	Nishant Pandya	Rishika Singh, Nishant Pandya, Paresh Bhatt, Yamini Joshi	

== July - September ==
Opening	Name	Genre	Director	Cast	Ref.
1 July	Saatam Aatham	Romantic drama	Shital Shah	Parikshit Tamaliya, Shital Shah, Denisha Ghumra	
1 July	Je Thashe Joyu Jashe	Comedy drama	Raja Saheb	Kuldeep Dave, Nikita Patel, Samarth Sharma, Nirav Kalal	
1 July	Vanveer	Drama	Vikram Dodiya	Kamlesh Barot, Mamta Chaudhari, Shailesh Bharada, Priyanka Parmar	
8 July	Vickida No Varghodo	Comedy drama	Rahul Bhole, Vinit Kanojia	Malhar Thakar, Monal Gajjar, Jinal Belani, Manasi Rachh	
8 July	Saiyar Mori Re	Drama	Vishal Vada Vala	Mayur Chahan, Yukti Randeria, Mehul Desai	
15 July	Tu Rajee Re	Drama	Hardik Bhatt	Divyang Thakkar, Janki Bodiwala, Anang Desai, Rajiv Mehta, Ghanashyam Nayak, Deepak Gheewala	
15 July	Sarathi	Comedy drama	Rafiq Usman Shaikh	Pratik Gandhi, Meenal Patel, Shekhar Shukla, Saumya Pandya, Chhaya Vora	
22 July	Raado	Drama action	Krishnadev Yagnik	Yash Soni, Hitu Kanodia, Tarjanee Bhadla, Bharat Chawda, Denisha Ghumra, Niilam Paanchal, Nikita Sharma, Prachi Thaker, Hiten Kumar	
22 July	Prem Yuddh	Drama	Anil Kulchainiya	Jeet Kumar, Kiran Kumar, Milind Gunaji, Prinal Oberoi	
29 July	Dayalu Devi Maa Dashama	Drama, devotional	Ashok Patel	Mamta Soni, Sanny Khatri, Dipika Raval, Aasha Panchal	
29 July	Tu Star Chhe	Comedy	K. R. Devmani	Bhushan Bhatt, Denisha Ghumra, Zakir Khan, Kamlesh Parmar	
29 July	53mu Panu	Drama	Kartavya Shah	Kinjal Rajpriya, Aarjav Trivedi, Chetan Daiya, Mehul Buch	
5 August	Mane Lai Ja	Drama	Niranjan Sharma	Mamta Solanki, Pratish Vora, Shraddha Padhiyar, Bhavini Jani	
11 August	Kon Parka Kon Potana	Action drama	Harsukh Patel	Vikram Thakor, Prashant Barot, Hitesh Raval, Prinal Oberoi, Jaimini Trivedi	
19 August	Fakt Mahilao Maate	Comedy	Jay Bodas	Yash Soni, Deeksha Joshi, Amitabh Bachchan	
26 August	Tallika	Horror drama	Mitali Jani	Aanchal Shah, Sanjeet Dhuri, Ojas Rawal, Jayaka Yagnik	
2 September	Raakh	Drama, Social	Piyush Rajnikant Pandya	Karishma Khoja, Pinky Jaiswal, Piyush Rajnikant Pandya, Vijay Desai, Hitesh Kumar	
2 September	Hey Kem Chho London	Comedy, Drama, Romance	Ssunny Suraani	Leena Jumani, Manas Shah, Mitra Gadhavi	
2 September	Mane Lagi Re Lagan Tara Prem Ni	Action, Drama, Romance	Ashok Ghosh	Rakesh Barot, Chaya Thakor, Ratan Rangwani, Jay Dodiya, Pooja Ghosh,	
9 September	Veer-Isha Nu Seemant	Comedy, Drama	Neeraj Joshi	Malhar Thakar, Puja Joshi	
9 September	Dard	Romance, drama	Bhagvan Vaghela	Prinal Oberoi, Hitu Kanodia, Prashant Barot, Morli Patel	
9 September	Tujhne Pokare Mari Preet	Drama	Rajankumar Vohra	Naresh Kanodia, Kamlesh Barot, Hitu Kanodia	
23 September	Maare Shu	Drama	Vikram N Chauhan	Dhavan Mewada, Bharat Thakkar, Deepak Antani, Samir Jagot	

== October–December ==
Opening	Name	Genre	Director	Cast	Ref.
7 October	Hoon Tari Heer	Romance	Dhwani Gautam	Puja Joshi, Ojas Rawal, Bharat Chawda, Dharmesh Vyas	
7 October	Chelli Panch Minute	Thriller	Aziz Ibrahim	Maulik Pathak, Chandani Chopra, Himanshu Turi, Riya Samani, Khushali Desai	
14 October	Madhav	Drama	Hetal Thakkar	Hitu Kanodia, Mehul Buch, Chetan Daiya, Smit Pandya	
14 October	Chhello Show	Coming-of-age drama	Pan Nalin	Bhavin Rabari, Bhavesh Shrimali, Richa Meena, Dipen Raval, Paresh Mehta	
14 October	Pran Chhute Pan Mari Preet Na Tute	Drama	Pathan Shahbaz	Zeel Joshi, Firoz Irani, Sanjay Patel, Paresh Bhatt	
14 October	GJ To NJ	Romantic drama	Pranav Patel	Nisarg Trivedi, Harshad Kandoliya	
25 October	BaagadBillaa	Thriller	Sachin Brahmbhatt	Chetan Dhanani, Ojas Rawal, Chetan Daiya, Jolly Rathod	
25 October	Khedut Ek Rakshak	Drama	Jitu Pandya	Vikram Thakor, Sweta Sen, Jitu Pandya, Guru Patel	
4 November	Chabutro	Drama	Chanakya Patel	Raunaq Kamdar, Dharmesh Vyas, Anjali Barot, Chhaya Vora, Annapurna	
4 November	Vaahlam Jaao Ne	Comedy	Hardik Gajjar	Pratik Gandhi, Deeksha Joshi, Sanjay Goradia, Tiku Talsania, Jayesh More, Ojas Rawal, Kavin Dave	
11 November	Kahi De Ne Prem Che	Drama	Rajesh Thakkar	Vishal Solanki, Smit Pandya, Kalpesh Patel, Mukesh Rao	
18 November	Aum Mangalam Singlem	Romantic comedy	Saandeep Patel	Malhar Thakar, Aarohi Patel, Darshan Jariwala, Aarti Vyas Patel, Nisarg Trivedi	
20 November	Purna Purushottam Shree Swaminarayan Bhagwan	Biographical mythological drama	Rakesh Pujara	Komal Thakkar, Atul Patel, Bhargav Joshi, Sunil Vaghela	
25 November	Medal	Drama	Dhaval Jitesh Shukla	Jayesh More, Kinjal Rajpriya, Maulik Nayak, Hemang Dave	
2 December	Bhagwaan Bachave	Comedy drama	Jhinal Belani	Jhinal Belani, Muni Jha, Jhinal Belani, Bhaumik Sampat, Mehul Buch, Bhavini Jani, Prem Gadhvi	
2 December	Dhaman	Action drama	Rajan R. Verma	Aarjav Trivedi, Jayesh More, Anang Desai, Bhavini Jani	
9 December	Shu Tame Kunwara Chho?	Comedy drama	Jayesh Trivedi	Amit Bhanushali, Mamta Soni, Kurush Deboo, Shekhar Shukla	
9 December	2G Apartments	Crime drama mystery	Akhil Kotak	Akhil Kotak, Bhavik Jagad, Chetan Daiya, Harshal Mankad Heyan	
16 December	Aghattit	Crime drama mystery	Bhushan Bhatt	Chetan Daiya, Alisha Prajapati, Archan Trivedi, Bimal Trivedi	
30 December	Takhubha Ni Talvar	Drama	Suresh Joshi	Nirav Kalal, Dhairya Rawal, Chhaya Shukla, Sunny Sonara	

== See also ==
- Gujarati cinema
- List of Gujarati films
- List of Gujarati films of 2023
- List of highest-grossing Gujarati films
