= List of Gujarati films of 2018 =

This is a list of Gujarati language films that were released in 2018. The Gujarati films collectively grossed ₹60 crore (US$6.3 million) in 2018, according to Ormax Box Office Report.

== January–March ==
Opening	Name	Genre	Director	Cast	Source
5 January	Tu Aavish To Kharo Ne	Drama	Bharat Patel	Jignesh Modi, Gopal Raval, Chetan Thakar, Shubhangini Pandey, Bhumika Patel	
5 January	Dhaad	Drama	Paresh Naik	Nandita Das, Kay Kay Menon, Sandeep Kulkarni, Raghubir Yadav, Sujata Mehta	
5 January	Mijaaj	Action, Drama	Tapan Vyas	Malhar Thakar, Esha Kansara, Revanta Sarabhai, Abhinay Banker, Jayesh More	
12 January	Maa	Drama	Utpal Modi	Khyati Madhu, Pooja Soni, Kavan Shah, Jitendra Thakkar	
2 February	Dhaakad	Drama	Dashrath M. Mali	Deepak Gheewala, Bhavini Jani, Jitu Pandya, Hitesh Raval, Jaimini Trivedi	
9 February	Pahelo Divas	Drama	Mahesh Babu	Dilip Prakash, Ashika Ranganath	
9 February	Tension Thai Gayu	Comedy	Shreedatt Vyas	Arvind Rathod, Vishal Solanki, Aiswharya Dussane, Prapti Ajwalia	
16 February	Dil Chemistry	Romance	Stuti Shukla	Vishal Solanki, Manny Raval, Twisha Bhatt, Ravi Omprakash Rao	
16 February	Undhinapur	Comedy	Mahesh S. Patel	Sanjay Dev, Shyamal Sheth, Jesus Mehta, Hardika Joshi, Asrani	
16 February	YD Family	Comedy	Yash Shreedatt Vyas	Disha Patel, Sagar Panchal, Deepak Gheewala, Tej Sapru	
23 February	GujjuBhai - Most Wanted	Comedy	Ishaan Randeria	Siddharth Randeria, Jimit Trivedi, Tejal Vyas, Purvi Vyas, Jayesh More	
23 February	Vitthala	Drama	Lucky Anand	Rutesh Patel, Nirmit Bhatt, Shailesh Pandya, Mahesh Rabari	
9 March	Befaam	Comedy	Kalp Trivedi	Kalpesh Rajgor, Hitesh Raval, Kanwal Taff, Priyanka Nadiwadwala, Muni Jha, Hemant Jha	
16 March	Ratanpur	Mystery, Thriller	Vipul Sharma	Tushar Sadhu, Jay Pandya, Jimmy Nanda, Jigar Bundela, Nirmit Vishnav, Haresh Dagiya	
16 March	Kasauti Mamta Ni	Drama	Ashok Ghosh	Hiten Kumar, Jyoti Sharma, Sajid Khan, Jaimini Trivedi	
23 March	Dil Dosti Love In Life	Drama	Keshav Rathod	Jignesh Modi, Chandan Rathod, Hasmukh Bhavsar	
23 March	Love Diary: Ek Prem Katha	Romance	Subrata Halder	Rohan Bhattacharjee, Sarmishta Acharjee, Palash Ganguly, Rashmi Sen	
30 March	Gujarati Wedding in Goa	Comedy	Ronny Rajhit	Jay Khetani, Garima Bhardwaj, Ronny Rajhit, Shivang Brahmbhatt	

== April–June ==
Opening	Name	Genre	Director	Cast	Source
6 April	Reva	Drama	Rahul Bhole & Vinit Kanojia	Chetan Dhanani, Monal Gajjar, Yatin Karyekar, Daya Shankar Pandey, Abhinay Banker	
13 April	Fera Feri Hera Feri	Comedy	Girish Mohite	Manoj Joshi, Shilpa Tulaskar, Haresh Dagiya, Bijal Joshi, Netri Trivedi	
20 April	Aavuj Reshe	Comedy	Nitin Jani	Mehul Kajaria, Yatin Parmar, Hemang Dave, Pooja Joshi	
20 April	Chitkar	Drama	Latesh Shah	Hiten Kumar, Sujata Mehta, Deepak Gheewala, Chhaya Vora, Latesh Shah	
27 April	Angry Family	Drama	Hanif Noyda	Jasmin Patel, Sohil Noyda, Nisha Mavani	
27 April	Tame Keva?	Drama	K. R. Devmani	Jakir Khan, Anand Devmani, Ashish Kakkad, Shraddha Suthar	
4 May	Kala Dhan Ni Dhamaal	Comedy	M.H. Chauhan	Surjit Dhuri, Anshi Parmar, Gaurav Rupdas	
11 May	Janmo Na Bandhan	Drama	Ashish Modi	Jyoti Sharma, Hitu Kanodia, Kiran Acharya	
11 May	Joothanu?	Mystery	Chandradhar Rao Putta	Zalak Patel, Aishwarya Naik, Nihal Patel, Simran Arora	
11 May	Oxygen	Romance	Chinmaay Purohit	Anshul Trivedi, Vyoma Nandi, Darshan Jariwala, Rohini Hattangadi, Pratiksha Lonkar	
18 May	Vandha Villas	Comedy	Chinmay Parmar	Haresh Dagiya, Swati Dave, Prapti Ajwalia, Esha Kansara, Vaishakh Ratanben, Rahul Rawal	
1 June	Pagalpanti	Comedy	Jakee Patel	Ali Azghar, Rahul Dev, Mukul Dev, Jayvijay Sachan, Bhavik Bhojak, Sahil Kohli	
1 June	Toh Lagi Sharat	Suspense	Nitin Vaidya	Ronit Vaidya, Priyank Gajjar, Nitin Vaidya, Jignesh Modi, Hitesh Raval, Himanshu Turi	
1 June	Mari Life Tari	Drama	Prashant Patel	Dev Patel, Manan Buch, Pratima Bharmbhat, Kunal Nayak, Heer Bhalla, Sharnam Soni, Sanjay Tanna, Meet Chaudhary	
8 June	Patni Nachave Bhagwan Bachave	Comedy	Himanshu Patel	Jignesh Modi, Nishant Pandya	
22 June	Chhutti Jashe Chhakka	Drama	Durgesh Tanna	Saurabh Rajyaguru, Janki Bodiwala, Bharat Chawda, Hemang Dave, Maulik Nayak	
22 June	Pahelo Pyaar Kadi Bhulashe Nahi	Drama	Jay Kumar	Nishant Pandya	
29 June	O Gori Meto Dil Thi Bandhi Che Preet	Romance	Subhash J. Shah	Komal Thakkar, Rohit Thakore	

== July–September ==
Opening	Name	Genre	Director	Cast	Source
1 July	Sex Education	Drama	Pranav Patel	Samarth Sharma, Divya Bhatt, Chetan Daiya, Harish Dagiya, Rajan Thakar, Sanjay Prajapati	
20 July	Back Bencher	Drama	Kirtan Patel	Krish Dharam Chauhan, Dharmendra Gohil, Bhavini Jani, Rajeev Mehta, Karan Patel, Ami Trivedi	
20 July	Stepney	Comedy	Aziz Naser	Aziz Naser, Gullu Dada, Sajid Khan	
27 July	Ani Maane	Comedy	Jay GB Patel	Jay GB Patel, Shiju Kataria	
27 July	Dost Taru Sapnu	Drama	Jenish Tailor	Mitesh Moga, Shefali Dan, Parth Kananni, Krishna Zala, Vijaysinh Gohil	
27 July	Satti Par Satto	Drama	Santram R Verma	Manas Shah, Neha Joshi, Khanjan Thumbar, Chandni Joshi, Paresh Bhat, Annie Singh, Farida Dadi, Sharad Sharma, Muni Jha, Maitrik Thakkar	
17 August	Janjar Na Zankare	Drama, Action	Vijay Limbachiya	Dhavan Mewada, Pragati Ahir, Sonia, Devendra Pandit	
24 August	Shu Thayu?	Drama, Comedy	Krishnadev Yagnik	Malhar Thakar, Yash Soni, Mitra Gadhvi, Aarjav Trivedi, Rahul Raval, Janki Bodiwala, Kinjal Rajpriya, Netri Trivedi	
30 August	Natsamrat	Drama	Jayant Gilatar	Siddharth Randeria, Manoj Joshi, Dipali Chikhalia Topiwala	
7 September	Lamboo Rastoo	Drama	Mihir Bhuta	Jay Soni, Shrenu Parikh, Manoj Joshi, Anang Desai, Maulik Pathak	
14 September	Ventilator	Drama, Comedy	Umang Vyas	Jackie Shroff, Pratik Gandhi, Mehul Buch, Utkarsh Mazmudar, Suchita Trivedi, Tejal Vyas, Krunal Pandit, Manan Desai, Mitra Gadhavi, Jayesh More	
21 September	Bagavat	Action	Jayesh Trivedi	Anita Raj, Sana Khan, Dilip Darbar	
21 September	Tari Maate Once More	Romance	Saurin Choudhary	Bharat Chawda, Janki Bodiwala, Ojas Rawal, Shraddha Dangar, Hemang Dave, Jolly Rathod, Meera Acharya, Ragi Jani	
28 September	Aa Chhe Aapni Dosti Unlimited Yaar	Drama	Shankar Rabari	Sunil Vishrani, Jignesh Modi, Hitesh Kumar, Vijay Desai, Karishma Khoja	
28 September	Dhh	Drama	Manish Saini	Naseeruddin Shah, Kahaan, Karan Patel, Kuldeep Sodha, Brijendra Kala	

== October–December ==
Opening	Movie name	Genre	Director	Cast	Source
5 October	Gattu My Friend	Comedy	Jagdish Soni	Salim Nagori	
5 October	Paghadi	Drama	Tapan Vyas	Revanta Sarabhai, Tillana Desai, Maulik Jagdish Nayak, Mayur Chauhan Aka Michael, Jay Upadhyay, Bharat Thakkar, Netri Trivedi, Mahesh Champaklal	
5 October	Suryansh	Action	Kamal Patel	Freddy Daruwala, Mehul Buch, Jay Bhatt, Ashish Kakkad, Nirmit Vaishnav, Heena Achhra	
18 October	Family Circus	Comedy, Drama, Romance	Viral Rao	Monal Gajjar, Raunaq Kamdar, Mitra Gadhavi, Smit Pandya, Bharat Chawda, Mehul Buch	
25 October	Sharato Lagu	Romance	Neeraj Joshi	Malhar Thakar, Deeksha Joshi	
16 November	I.M.A. Gujju	Patriotic	Sunny Pancholi	Rohit Roy, Manoj Joshi, Sunny Pancholi, Shriya Tiwari, Parth Thakar, Rushikesh Ingley	
8 November	Dada Ho Dikree	Drama	Aziz Khan	Kinjal Dave, Aziz Khan, Jitu Pandya, Bhavini Jani, Bharat Thakkar, Yamini Joshi	
7 December	Midnights with Menka	Comedy	Viral Shah	Naresh Kanodia, Malhar Thakar, Esha Kansara, Parth Oza, Hardik Sangani, Vinita Mahesh	

== See also ==
- List of Gujarati films
- List of highest-grossing Gujarati films
