= Aditya Gadhvi =

Indian singer and lyricist (born 1994)

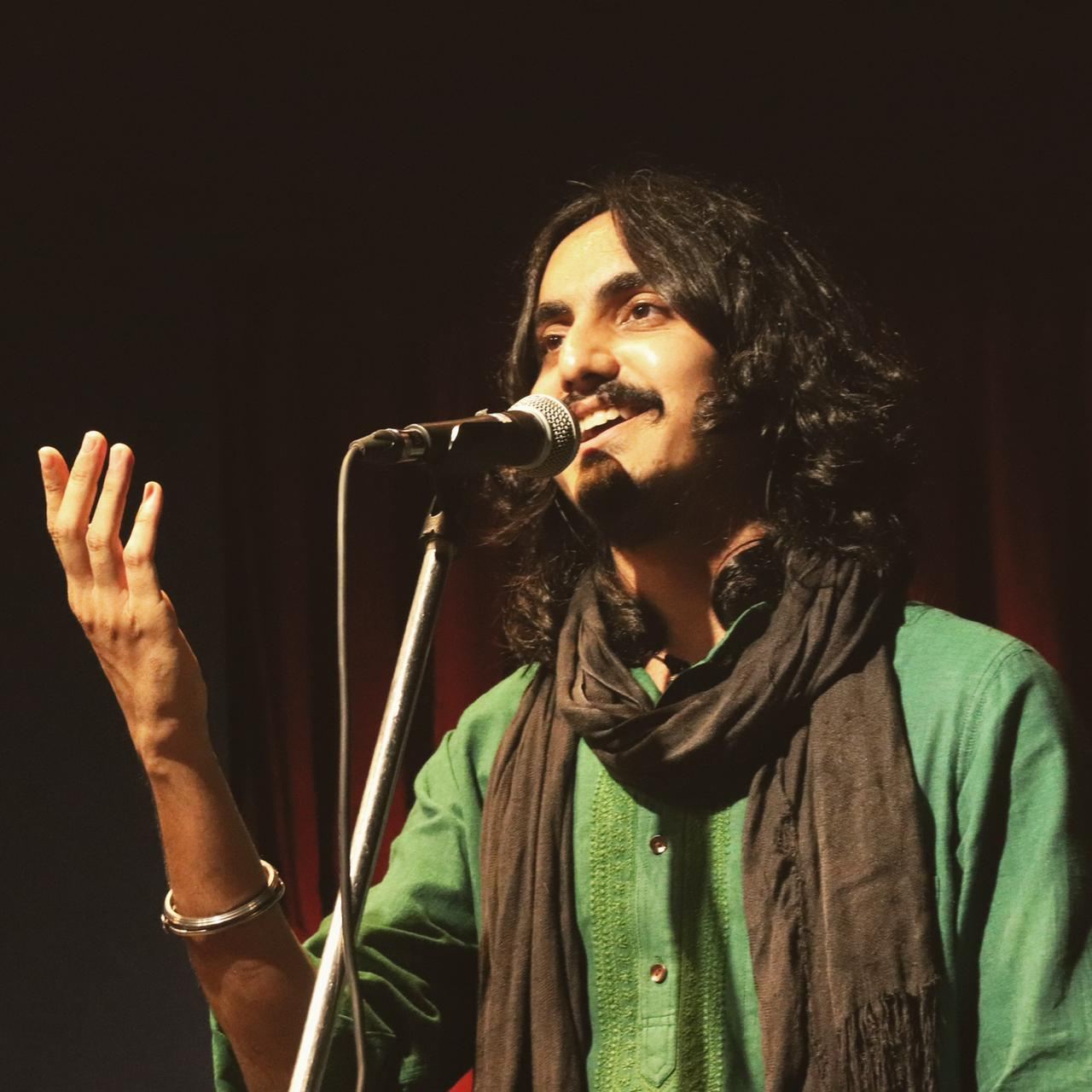
- Aditya Gadhvi At Digital Dayro In 2020

Background information
- Born: Aditya Gadhvi; 3 April 1994 (age 32); Surendranagar, Gujarat, India
- Years active: 2004

Aditya Gadhvi (born 3 April 1994) is a playback singer and lyricist from Gujarat, India. He has rendered numerous chart-topping songs in various Indian languages. He is involved in Gujarati film scoring and has released a number of singles. Among his recent notable tracks are Khalasi, Rang Morla, the Gujarat Titans anthem Aava De, and several others.

== Early life ==
Gadhvi was born in Gujarat to a Gujarati family. His father is Yogesh Gadhvi. He speaks fluent Gujarati and Hindi.

== Career ==
He was a winner of ETV Lok Gayak Gujarat. A folk and Sufi singer, he sang 2 songs from the movie Kamasutra: The Revenge, which were shortlisted for nominations in the Best Original Song category for the 86th Academy Awards. After winning the show Lok Gayak Gujarat, Gadhvi performed Gujarati folk music all over Gujarat, as well as in Hong Kong. Gadhvi gave his voice to represent Gujarat's tableau in the Republic Day Parade of 26 January. This parade was in the presence of United States of America's President Barack Obama and India's Prime Minister Shri Narendra Modi, as well as thousands of other guests. He performed with A .R. Rahman as a backing vocalist in his live shows in Dubai, Vadodara, etc. Gadhvi has worked with A. R. Rahman on the Bollywood film Lekar Hum Deewana Dil.

During IPL 2023, Aditya performed the Gujarat Titans anthem "Aava De" before the match at Narendra Modi Stadium. Gadhvi has performed in a series of international live stage shows in the US and Canada. He is also featured in the recently launched Coke Studio Bharat.

He is popular for hits such as 'Sharato Lagu', 'Hellaro' and 'Love Ni Bhavai' among many others. Bollywood actress Priyanka Chopra has performed dandiya on Gadhvi's song when he performed "Dakla" song on Navratra festival.

Prime Minister Narendra Modi praised the popular song 'Khalasi' and its singer, Aditya Gadhvi. The song, released by Coke Studio India in July 2023, quickly gained popularity. PM Modi retweeted a post where Aditya Gadhvi mentioned their first meeting, expressing admiration for the singer and the song.

In the same year, he was featured on the song "Wheel of Time", from the album, Sounds of Kumbha, by Grammy-nominated producer Siddhant Bhatia alongside Ajay Prasanna and Yashraj. The album went on to be nominated at the 68th Annual Grammy Awards in the category for Best Global Music Album.

== International performances ==
Gadhvi has performed in a series of international live stage shows in the United States and Canada, presenting Gujarati folk and contemporary music to Indian diaspora audiences. His overseas performances have included concerts, cultural festivals, and garba events held across multiple North American cities.

== Discography ==
Year	Film/Album	Song	Co-singer(s)	Composer(s)	Writer(s)	Ref
2013	Amber Gaje					
2013	Koi Ne Kehsho Nahi					
2014	Krishan Kanaiyo					
2016	Mahadev (Gujarati)					
2016	Celebrating World Music Day- Best Indipop of Red Ribbon					
2016	Celebrating World Music Day- Best Gujarati of Red Ribbon					
2017	Mahashivratri Essentials- Gujarati					
2017	Mor Bani Thanghat Kare	Vaadaldi Varsi Re	Aishwarya Majmudar			
2018	Mahadev (Gujarati)					
2019	Red Raas Season 9					
2019	Har Har Mahadev- Gujarati					
2020	Meera Ne Madhav No Raas		Jahnvi Shrimankar	Parth Bharat Thakkar		
2021	Vitthal Teedi	Vitthal Vitthal		Bhargav Purohit		
2022	Gajro		Priya Saraiya		Priya Saraiya	
2022	Naagar Nandji Na Lal	Naagar Nandji Na Lal			Narsinh Mehta	
2022	Aava De (Gujarat Titans' Anthem)	Aava De		Dub Sharma		
2023	Vaarso (Season 1)	Rang Morla	Priya Saraiya	Parth Bharat Thakkar	Kag Bapu	
2023	Aavo Nar Naar Aaj	Aavo Nar Naar Aaj		Parth Doshi	Jainam Sanghvi	
2023	Coke Studio India	Khalasi		Achint	Saumya Joshi	

=== Film songs ===
Year	Film	Song	Composer(s)	Lyricist(s)	Co-singer(s)
2017	Saravanan Irukka Bayamaen	"Marhaba Aavona"	D. Imman	Yugabharathi	Shreya Ghoshal
2018	GujjuBhai - Most Wanted	"Sar Sar Ke"			Riya Shah
2018	Ventilator	"Amba Re Amba" "Bhada Na Makan Ma"	Parth Bharat Thakkar	Niren Bhatt	Parthiv Gohil
2019	Viswasam	"Adchithookku"	D. Imman	Viveka	D. Imman, Narayanan
2019	Hellaro	"Sapana Vinani Raat"	Mehul Surti	Saumya Joshi	
2020	Luv Ni Love Storys	"Luv Ni Love Storys"		Aditya Gadhvi	Siddharth Amit Bhavsar, Yashika Sikka
2020	Luv Ni Love Storys	Manzil		Niren Bhatt	Keerthi Sagathia, Siddharth Amit Bhavsar
2022	Kehvatlal Parivar	"Utho Utho"	Sachin-Jigar	Bhargav Purohit	
2022	Nayika Devi: The Warrior Queen	"Aaj Karo Kesariya"	Parth Bharat Thakkar	Chirag Tripathi	Parthiv Gohil
2023	Shubh Yatra	"Sachvine Jaajo"	Kedar and Bhargav	Bhargav Purohit	
2023	Var Padharavo Saavdhan	"Ghani Khamma"	Rahul Prajapati	Bhargav Purohit	
2023	Meera (2023 Film)	"Haiya Ma Prit Jagaadi"	Alap Desai	Dilip Rawal	
2023	Meera (2023 Film)	"Amrutdhaar"	Alap Desai	Dilip Rawal	
2025	All The Best Pandya	"Jung"	Prashant Satose	Parth Tarpara	
2025	Mithada Maheman	"Mithada Maheman"	Rahul Munjariya	Bhargav Purohit	
2025	Jai Kanhaiyalall Ki	"Jai Kanhaiyalall Ki - Title Track"	Kedar Upadhyay, Bhargav Purohit	Niren Bhatt	
2026	King of Salangpur	"Hari Bol"	Prashant Satose	Niraj Ker	

== Achievements & awards ==
- Global Indian Music Academy Award for Best Traditional Folk Single
- Featured on the song "Wheel of Time", from the album Sounds of Kumbha, which went on to be nominated at the 68th Annual Grammy Awards in the category for Best Global Music Album.
- He has sung two songs in the movie Kamasutra: The Revenge, which were shortlisted for nominations in the Best Original Song category for the 86th Academy Awards.
