= Gujjubhai the Great =

Gujjubhai The Great
- Official poster
- Directed by: Ishaan Randeria
- Written by: Ishaan Randeria
- Produced by: Devendra N. Patel in association with Siddharth Randeria Productions
- Starring: Siddharth Randeria; Jimit Trivedi; Swati Shah; Dipna Patel; Alekh Sangal; Sunil Vishrani; Annapurna Shukla; Khatera Hakimi; Dharmesh Vyas
- Cinematography: Himanshu Dubey
- Edited by: Tushar Parekh
- Music by: Parth Bharat Thakkar; Advait Nemlekar
- Distributed by: PVR Pictures
- Release date: 18 September 2015
- Running time: 145 minutes
- Country: India
- Language: Gujarati
- Box office: ₹ 15 crore

Gujjubhai The Great (Gujarati: ગુજ્જુભાઈ ધ ગ્રેટ) is a 2015 Gujarati comedy film directed by Ishaan Randeria. It is presented by Nakshatra Entertainment and produced by Devendra N. Patel in association with Siddharth Randeria Productions. The film is a comedy drama based on the super-hit franchise of Gujjubhai stage-plays. The film stars Siddharth Randeria, Jimit Trivedi, Swati Shah, Dipna Patel, Alekh Sangal, Sunil Vishrani, Khatera Hakimi and Dharmesh Vyas. The film was released on 18 September.

== Cast ==
- Siddharth Randeria as Hasmukh Gandhi
- Swati Shah as Pramila Gandhi
- Dipna Patel as Tanisha Gandhi Buch
- Jimit Trivedi as Bakul Buch
- Alekh Sangal as Montu Sharma
- Falguni Rajani as Laila
- Sunil Vishrani as Inspector Aakash Jhala
- Khatera Hakimi as Soniya Kapoor
- Dharmesh Vyas as Bade Bhai
- Vanlataben aka "Vanu Baa " Gandhi

== Plot ==
The film begins with an opening shot of the Gandhi residence before the film rewinds to introduce the characters. Hasmukh Gandhi is a happy go lucky man, but his stress-free life is interrupted when his daughter, Tanisha comes home with her boyfriend, Montu. Tanisha was a die hard fan of Superstar Sonia Kapoor, and Montu promised her that he knows Sonia Kapoor well and will once take her to meet Sonia. Montu went to Ahmedabad on a challenge that he can get any girl. He offered Gandhi a partnership in his upcoming project, which was rejected by Gandhi, as he knew Montu had malicious intentions. The Gandhi family, however, fell for Montu's charm. Not wanting his daughter to be entrapped, Hasmukh finds Bakul Booch as the perfect one for Tanisha. Bakul is Hasmakh's manager in his office. He and Tanisha were childhood friends. When Hasmukh revealed his plan of getting Bakul married to Tanisha, Bakul denied and said he was not a perfect match and was very shy as against Tanisha. Hasmukh takes it upon himself to transform Bakul into a cool 'gujju'. He plans to create a fake relationship between Bakul with superstar Sonia Kapoor. Tanisha was a die hard fan of Sonia.

In the interim, Hasmukh meets Laila in a meeting, who realises that Hasmukh was a rich man and thus she plans to trap Hasmukh by asking him to give money in order to get rid of her. Hasmukh's wife was unaware of Laila's blackmailing.

Hasmukh and Bakul meet Sonia in a hotel after fooling her bodyguard and take pictures and videos of her and Bakul. Bakul was disguised as a blind patient and Hasmukh disguised him as a doctor of a Foundation. These pictures and videos become viral and Tanisha gets impressed with Bakul. She slowly started falling in love with Bakul. Montu discovers his plan and decides to expose Bakul to Tanisha. Tanisha requests Bakul to help her meet Sonia Kapoor, but he becomes hesitant. Montu plans to expose Bakul and takes the entire family to Sonia's shooting place. Sonia instantly recognises Bakul and greets him. When Montu tells Sonia that Bakul is a liar, she tells that she doesn't know Montu and never met her. Tanisha gets angry on Montu for lying her of knowing Sonia Kapoor. Meanwhile, the police suspect Hasmukh and Bakul to be wanted terrorists and follow their every move. However a mobster called Badebhai -who is the actress’ real boyfriend- finds out about this relationship, and thinking it's real, visits the Gandhi residence to kill Bakul. However the police seize the house and capture Badebhai, but Bakul gets injured when Badebhai shoots from his gun. He gets fed up of the entire family and asks the police to arrest him. Bakul is taken away in an ambulance for treatment. The film ends with Tanisha and the rest of the Gandhi family visiting Bakul in hospital, Montu leaving Ahmedabad, and Badebhai in jail.

== Production ==
The film is based on the Gujarati stage play series, Gujjubhai starring Sidhharth Randeria. Ishaan Randeria, son of lead actor Siddharth, wrote the screenplay and directed the film which went into production for one and half year. Apara Mehta was approached for the role in 2014 but declined due to busy schedule. They shot across Ahmedabad for 40 days including at heritage houses, Sabarmati Riverfront and Kankaria lake.

== Soundtrack ==
Gujjubhai The Great features songs sung by Divya Kumar, Parth Oza, Advait Nemlekar, Vibha Saraf, Ketan Singh, Mansheel Gujral, Shikha Jain. Music and Background Score for the film is composed by Parth Bharat Thakkar and additional music is by Advait Nemlekar. The soundtrack was launched on 31 August at Ahmedabad.

Gujjubhai The Great

Soundtrack album by Parth Bharat Thakkar & Advait Nemlekar
- Released: 31 August 2015
- Genre: Feature film soundtrack
- Length: 13:25
- Label: Junglee Music

Tracklist
No.	Title	Lyrics	Artist(s)	Length
1.	"Gujjubhai Jule Che"	Niren Bhatt	Divya Kumar	3:15
2.	"Ek Biladi Jadi"	Niren Bhatt	Parth Oza	2:22
3.	"Feeling Avnavi"	Niren Bhatt	Advait Nemlekar, Vibha Saraf	4:30
4.	"I Dance Baby"	Ishaan Randeria, Jaswant Singh Rathore.	Advait Nemlekar, Ketan Singh, Mansheel Gujral, Shikha Jain	3:18
Total length:				13:25

== Release ==
The official poster for the film was released on 18 August 2015. The first trailer was released online on 25 August 2015 and was received positively by the audiences. The film released on 18 September in Gujarat, Mumbai, and Pune. Seeing the positive response in the first week, the film was released in Delhi, Gurgaon, Udaipur, Hyderabad, Vijaywada, Indore, Bangalore, Nagpur, and Kolkata.

== Reception ==
The film grossed ₹15 crore at the box office.

The film received positive reviews. Mid-Day said, "The film appeals to its target audience because it has everything they expect from Gujjubhai, and in spite of the crazy goings-on, there is no overacting and very little slapstick." DeshGujarat said, "Siddharth Randeria's Gujjubhai the great fully entertains with lots of laugh-out-loud moments throughout the film."

== Sequel ==
A sequel GujjuBhai - Most Wanted was released on February 23, 2018, starring Siddharth Randeria and Jimit Trivedi reprised their roles and was directed again by Ishaan Randeria.
