= Meera (2023 film) =

2023 film directed by Dilip Dixit

- Movie poster
- Directed by: Dilip Dixit
- Written by: Dilip Dixit
- Produced by: Khushanu Dixit
- Starring: Heena Varde; Sanjay Parmar; Chetan Daiya; Maulik Chauhan; Raj Mehta
- Cinematography: Suraj C Kurade
- Music by: Aalap Desai
- Production company: Intelliflix Productions LLP
- Release date: 27 October 2023
- Running time: 137 minutes
- Country: India
- Language: Gujarati

Meera is a 2023 Gujarati movie, this film written and directed by Dilip Dixit, starring Heena Varde in titular role of Meera along with Sanjay Parmar, Chetan Daiya, Maulik Chauhan and others. The film is produced by Khushanu Dixit.

The film won three awards (Best Feature Film, Best Actress Feature Film, Best Director Feature Film) at the 2023 Boden International Film Festival.

== Plot ==
Meera is a girl growing up in a traditional village in Gujarat that is bogged down by Patriarchal practices. The film's narrative delves into her entrepreneurial success, which serves as a beacon of hope and inspiration for her fellow villagers. Her journey becomes a powerful symbol of women's empowerment and self-reliance, challenging the oppressive mindset deeply entrenched within their community.Meera's journey transcends her personal struggle. Her success prompts traditionalist in her community to confront their oppressive mindset.

== Cast ==
- Heena Varde as Meera
- Sanjay Parmar
- Chetan Daiya
- Maulik Chauhan
- Magan Luhar
- Reeva Rachh
- Parmeshwar Sirsikar
- Kinnal Nayak
- Harshida Pankhaniya
- Dharal Shah
- Atul Lakhani
- Jiya Bhatt
- Neel Joshi
- Raj Mehta

== Production ==
The movie has been produced by Khushanu Dixit under the banner of Intellifilx Productions LLP and Directed by Dilip Dixit. The music of the film has given by Aalap Desai. Aditya Gadhvi, Aishwarya Majumdar & Alap Desai has given their voices for the song. The entire movie has been shoot at different part of Gujarat.

== Soundtrack ==
Meera

Studio album by Alap Desai
- Released: 23 September 2023
- Genre: Feature film soundtrack
- Label: Intelliflix Productions

=== Tracklist ===
The soundtrack of the album is composed by Alap Desai with lyrics written by Dilip Rawal. The soundtrack album consists of Five tracks.

No.	Title	Lyrics	Music	Singer(s)	Length
1.	"Haatho Ma Haath"	Dilip Rawal	Alap Desai	Aishwarya Majumdar	4:15
2.	"Haiya Ma Prit Jagaadi"	Dilip Rawal	Alap Desai	Aditya Gadhvi	6:18
3.	"Amrutdhaar"	Dilip Rawal	Alap Desai	Aditya Gadhvi	3:15
4.	"Dhartimata"	Dilip Rawal	Alap Desai	Alap Desai	3:57
5.	"Avyo Avsar Rudo"	Dilip Rawal	Alap Desai	Chorus	2:07
Total length:					19:59

== Release ==
The teaser of the film was released on 2 August 2023. The Audio Juke box of the film was released on 22 September 2023. The trailer of the film was released on digital platforms on 29 September 2023, which explores the theme of woman empowerment and entrepreneurial success. The film was released theatrically on 27 October 2023.

== Accolades ==
The film received 6 nominations at the 21st Transmedia Gujarati Awards.

== See also ==
- List of Gujarati films of 2023
