= Vahali =

2025 film directed by Eventus India Entertainment

- Official Poster
- Directed by: Eventus India Entertainment
- Written by: Gaurav Naik
- Produced by: Eventus India Entertainment
- Starring: Bhavin Bhanushali; Mazel Vyas; Sachin Parikh; Krunal Pandit
- Cinematography: Tapan Vyas
- Edited by: Omkar Mohla
- Music by: Parth Bharat Thakkar
- Production company: Eventus India Entertainment
- Distributed by: Rupam Entertainment Pvt. Ltd
- Release date: 11 July 2025
- Country: India
- Language: Gujarati

Vahali is a 2025 Gujarati family drama, produced & directed by Eventus India Entertainment, starring Bhavin Bhanushali, Mazel Vyas, and Sachin Parikh.

== Cast ==
- Bhavin Bhanushali as Parth
- Mazel Vyas as Priya
- Sachin Parikh as Parimal
- Krunal Pandit as Mahadev
- Bhoomi Shukla as Kalpana
- Arpita Sethia as Mamta
- Gayatri Rawal as Anu Masi
- Shefali Mahida as Khyati
- Vishal Solanki as Aadi

== Soundtrack ==
Parth Bharat Thakkar has composed 2 songs of the album. Chirag Tripathi has given the lyrics for the 2 songs

Vahali

Soundtrack album
- Released: 2025
- Genre: Feature film soundtrack
- Length: 6:45
- Language: Gujarati
- Label: Eventus India Entertainment

=== Tracklist ===
Track listing
No.	Title	Lyrics	Music	Singer(s)	Length
1.	"Paiso Re"	Chirag Tripathi	Parth Bharat Thakkar	Aditya Gadhvi	03.02
2.	"Atrangi Prem"	Chirag Tripathi	Parth Bharat Thakkar	Jigardan Gadhavi	03.42
3.	"Maaro Laalo"	Dilip Rawal	Navin Shivram	Neelanjana Ray	03.17
Total length:					10.01

== Reception ==
Priyanka Triveddi of VTv Gujarati said that “The film’s first half moves at a brisk pace, much like popcorn and Pepsi being served, but in the second half, the film drags considerably.”

== Marketing and Releases ==
The announcement of the film has been made on May 19, 2025 on social media. The poster of the film released on social media on May 27, 2025. The teaser of the film released on June 4, 2025 on social media. The trailer of the film released on June 27, 2025 on social media. The film is set to release for July 11, 2025

== See also ==
- List of Gujarati films of 2025
