= Bachubhai =

2023 Gujarati comedy film

- Official Poster
- Directed by: Rahul Bhole; Vinit Kanojia
- Written by: Chirayu Mistry; Om Bhatt; Manan Desai
- Produced by: Jyoti Deshpande; Sharad Patel; Shreyanshi Patel
- Starring: Siddharth Randeria; Apara Mehta
- Cinematography: Bibhuti Bhusan Biswal
- Music by: Parth Bharat Thakkar; Amar Khandha
- Production companies: Jio Studios; SP Cinecorp
- Distributed by: Panorama Studios
- Release date: 21 July 2023
- Running time: 120 minutes
- Country: India
- Language: Gujarati

Bachubhai is a 2023 Gujarati comedy, film directed by Rahul Bhole and Vinit Kanojia . It stars Siddharth Randeria. Apara Mehta, and others. It is produced by Jyoti Deshpande, Sharad Patel and Shreyanshi Patel. The film is going to distributed by Panorama Studios and Music has been acquired by Times Music

== Plot ==
Bachubhai is a journey of an old man who decides to go back to college, in pursuit of getting back his job. Will he triumph against all odds and make his dream a reality?

== Cast ==
- Siddharth Randeria as Bachubhai
- Apara Mehta as Nirmala
- Amit Singh Thakur as Vilin Patel
- Naman Gor as Agam
- Poorvi Palan as Duri Suk
- Om Bhatt as Nalin
- RJ Kshitij as an employee

== Production ==
It is produced under the banner of JioCinema and An SP Cinecorp. The music of the film has given by Parth Bharat Thakkar & Amar Khandha. The entire movie has been shoot at one location in Vadodara.

== Soundtrack ==
Bachubhai

Studio album by Parth Bharat Thakkar & Amar Khandha
- Released: 11 July 2023
- Genre: Feature film soundtrack
- Length: 12:20
- Label: Times Music

=== Tracklist ===
The soundtrack of the album is composed by Parth Bharat Thakkar & Amar Khandha with lyrics written by Niren Bhatt, Bhargav Purohit, Chetan Dhanani, Amar Khandha, Chirag Tripathi & Manan Desai. The soundtrack album consists of five tracks.

No.	Title	Lyrics	Music	Singer(s)	Length
1.	"Bachubhai Title"	Niren Bhatt	Parth Bharat Thakkar	Parth Bharat Thakkar	2:39
2.	"Jivi Le"	Bhargav Purohit	Amar Khandha	Siddharth Amit Bhavsar	3:18
3.	"Naach Re"	Chetan Dhanani & Amar Khandha	Amar Khandha	Shantanu Kabir, Senjuti Das, Umesh Joshi, Vijay Dhuri, Pragati Joshi, & Madhura Paranjape, Aparna Nimkar	2:56
4.	"Vahla Re Vahlam Ji"	Chirag Tripathi	Parth Bharat Thakkar	Nisha Kapadia	1:10
5.	"Badha Sambhado – Tatva Fest"	Manan Desai	Parth Bharat Thakkar	Om Bhatt	2:17
Total length:					12:20

== Release ==
The music of the film acquired by Times Music. The film was released theatrically on July 21, 2023.

== Accolades ==
The film received 6 nominations at the 21st Transmedia Gujarati Awards.

== See also ==
- List of Gujarati films of 2023
