= Vyoma Nandi =

Indian-Canadian actor

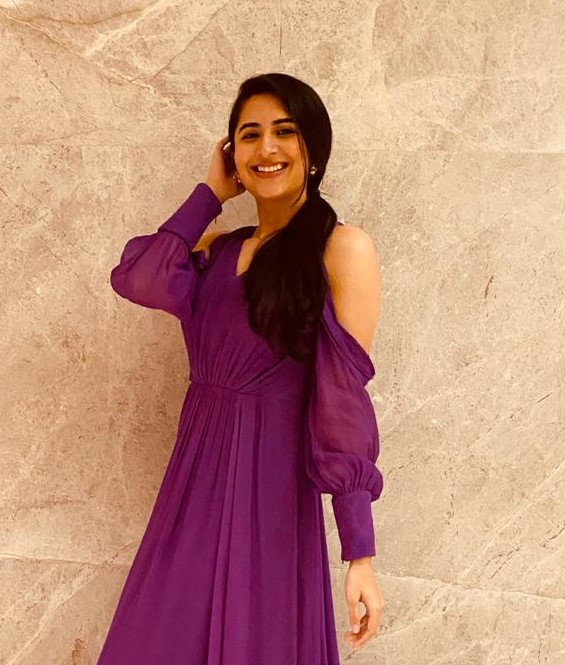
- Born: Jamnagar, Gujarat, India
- Occupation: Actor
- Years active: 2016–present

Vyoma Nandi is an Indian Canadian actor and model who works primarily in the Gujarati film Industry. She made her acting debut in 2016 with Telugu film Marala Telupana Priya as the lead actress. In 2017, she made her Gujarati film debut with crime thriller Cash on Delivery opposite Malhar Thakar. She went on to appear in several commercially successful Gujarati films, including Gujjubhai-Most wanted (2018), Oxygen (2018), Luv Ni Love Storys (2020). She won Best Debut award at the Gujarati Iconic Film Awards for her performance in Cash on Delivery.

== Early life ==
Nandi was born in Jamnagar, Gujarat to Pramesh Nandi and Chandni Nandi. She spent her early childhood in Ahmedabad and later her family moved to Toronto, Canada. She did her schooling at Chinguacousy Secondary School and graduated in psychology from York University.

== Career ==
Nandi worked as a child model for various ads and prints for known brands in India, before moving to Canada. In 2014, Nandi returned to India to pursue her acting dreams and completed diploma from Roshan Taneja School of Acting, Mumbai. Her debut in Telugu film was in Marala Telupana Priya opposite Prince Cecil in 2016. She won the Best Debut Actress award at the Gujarati Iconic Film Award in 2017 for her role in the crime thriller Cash on Delivery.

Later she appeared in the comedy film Gujjubhai-Most wanted (2018), the second film in Gujjubhai film series and sequel to Gujjubhai the Great (2015). The film opened to positive reviews and was a commercial success. Her next project was Oxygen (2018) opposite Anshul Trivedi.

She played a pivotal role in romantic comedy film Luv Ni Love Storys released in 2020.

Nandi has been a judge on the first season of the Gujarati dance reality show Naach Maari Sathe which aired on Colors Gujarati in 2018. She has also won the title of Gujarat's Most Desirable Woman on TV 2019 from the Ahmedabad Times.

She was awarded the title of Ahmedabad Times Most Desirable Woman 2020 and also featured in the Top 50 on Times Most Desirable Women 2020 list.

== Filmography ==
Year	Title	Role	Language	Notes
2016	Marala Telupana Priya	Vaishnavi	Telugu	
2017	Cash on Delivery	Aditi	Gujarati	
2018	Gujjubhai-Most wanted	Priya Rajguru	Gujarati	
2018	Oxygen	Natasha Mehta	Gujarati	
2020	Luv Ni Love Storys	Sonam Gupta	Gujarati	
2022	Bhool Bhulaiyaa 2	Rajjo	Hindi	
2023	Gulaam Chor	Saloni Sisodiya	Gujarati	
2023	Hurry Om Hurry	Vini	Gujarati	
2025	Taaro Thayo	Antra	Gujarati	
2025	Jai Mata Ji - Let's Rock		Gujarati	

== Television and Web Series ==
Year	Name	Role	Network	Notes	Ref
2018	Naach Maari Sathe	Herself	Colors Gujarati	Judge	
2021	Unknown to known	Disha	ShemarooMe		

== Awards ==
Year	Award	Category	Nominated work	Notes	Ref
2017	Gujarati Iconic Film Awards	Best Debut	Cash on Delivery	Won	
2021	Film Excellence Awards Gujarati	Best Actress	Luv Ni Love Storys	Won	
