= Manan Desai =

Indian actor, comedian

- Born: Mumbai, Maharashtra
- Occupations: YouTuber; actor; comedian
- Years active: 2012-present
- Known for: The Lavari Show - A Gujarati Live Standup & Podcast Show
- Spouse: Vidya Manan Desai

YouTube information
- Channel: Manan Desai
- Genres: Comedy; Gameplay
- Subscribers: 107 thousand
- Views: 50 million
- Last updated: 15 April 2026

Manan Desai is an Indian actor, comedian, and a former Radio Jockey. He is co-founder of Gujarati YouTube channel The Comedy Factory. In past, he worked as a RJ in My FM and Radio Mirchi. He was also in Indian comedy reality show Comedy Nights Bachao along with Amruta Khanvilkar. He acted in Gujarati films like Ventilator, Chor Bani Thangaat Kare, and Order Order Out Of Order.

== Filmography ==
Year	Film	Role	Language	Other notes	Ref.
2016	Be With Me	Unknown	Gujarati	Cameo	
2017	Chor Bani Thangaat Kare	Shahnawaz	Gujarati		
2018	Ventilator	Ajit Bhai	Gujarati		
2019	Order Order Out Of Order	Special Appearance	Gujarati		
2019	Made in China (2019 film)	Shany Sexologist - 2	Hindi	Cameo	
2022	Vickida No Varghodo	in song "Draaksh Khati Che"	Gujarati		
2023	Bachubhai	Co-written with Chirayu Mistry	Gujarati		

=== Television ===
Year	Title	Role	Language	Platform	Notes	Ref.
2014-15	Hirji Ni Marji	Chukyo	Gujarati	ETV Gujarati		
2016-17	Comedy Nights Bachao	Mosso loso	Hindi	Colors TV	Season 1 (Episode 45th), Season 2 (All)	
2019	Jestination Unknown	gendo	Hindi	Amazon Prime Video		
2020	Manan Ni Therapy	Himself	Gujarati	YouTube	Season 1 (All)	
2024-Present	The Lavari Show	Himself	Gujarati	YouTube		
