= Chor Bani Thangaat Kare =

- Directed by: Rahul Bhole
- Written by: Rahul Bhole; Chetan Dhanani; Mehul Vyas; Vinit Kanojia
- Produced by: Arpan Pandya; Harsh Parmar
- Starring: Amit Mistry; Bijal Joshi; Prem Gadhavi; Manan Desai; Ojas Rawal; Nirmit Vaishnav; Sharad Sharma; Annapurna Shukla; Jineeta Rawal; Prashant Barot
- Cinematography: Suraj Kurade
- Music by: Parth Bharat Thakkar
- Production company: Reelium Films
- Release date: 21 July 2017
- Running time: 145 minutes
- Country: India
- Language: Gujarati

Chor Bani Thangaat Kare (Gujarati: ચોર બની થનગાટ કરે) is a 2017 Gujarati comedy, drama film directed by Rahul Bhole and written by Rahul Bhole, Chetan Dhanani, Mehul Vyas and Vinit Kanojia. It is produced by Arpan Pandya and Harsh Parmar with Supervising Producer Sachi Rathod under the banner of Reelium Films . The film stars Amit Mistry, Bijal Joshi, Prem Gadhavi, Manan Desai, Ojas Rawal, Nimrit Vaishnav, Sharad Sharma, Annapurna Shukla, Jineeta Rawal and Prashant Barot. The soundtrack album is composed by Sachin–Jigar, while lyrics for the songs were written by Niren Bhatt. Filmed mostly in Ahmedabad, the film is a comedy of errors about the lead character Rajkumar Trivedi, aka Robin, who has Kleptomania and his only way of recovering is by finding true love. The film released on 21 July 2017 to a universally positive response from critics and audiences.

== Cast ==
- Amit Mistry as Robin aka Rajkumar
- Bijal Joshi as Khushbu
- Prem Gadhavi as Lalit aka Lenti
- Manan Desai as Shahnawaz
- Nirmit Vaishnav as Vanrajsinh Jadeja
- Ojas Rawal as Jayanti Charkat
- Sharad Sharma as Khan Baba
- Annapurna Shukla as Khushbu's Dadi
- Jineeta Rawal as Pooja
- Prashant Barot as Robin's Father
- Harikrishna Dave as Mindi Ustaad
- Chirayu Mistry as Moksh (Collection Agent)

== Plot ==
Plot Rajkumar Trivedi (Amit Mistry), aka Robin, is disowned by his father (Prashant Barot) in childhood because of his compulsive habit of stealing. He moves to the city of Ahmedabad where his stealing habit puts him in difficulties at every turn of his life. Soon he learns that he is suffering from Kleptomania and the only cure for it is to find true love. He falls for Khushbu (Bijal Joshi) and tries to pursue her. But his stealing habit is revealed soon and Khushbu breaks up with him. Determined to win her back, Robin resolves to give back what he has taken from the society. Inadvertently, he gets embroiled in a brawl of terrorists, politicians, police and Godmen.

== Release ==
The film released on 21 July 2017 to an overwhelmingly positive responses from across the board. Shruti Jambhekar of The Times of India gave it a 4-star rating saying, "Rahul Bhole in his debut venture has done a commendable job of filming a fun-filled story with right casting. Just the masala movie and family entertainer with right comic timings that Dhollywood was missing out for some time." Jignesh Vasavada from creanara also gave it 4 stars adding,"It is a ROCKING movie. This is the time the Gujarati Film Fraternity should come out in large numbers, spend money and watch the film. That would be a true contribution to lovely films like this." The film went on to garner approximately 8–900,000 INR on its opening day while bringing another 10–1.1 million INR on the second day (Saturday).

== Soundtrack ==
Chor Bani Thangaat Kare

Soundtrack album by Sachin–Jigar
- Released: 10 July 2017
- Genre: Feature film soundtrack
- Length: 20:15
- Label: Zee Music Gujarati

Sachin–Jigar chronology
Meri Pyaari Bindu (2017)	Chor Bani Thangaat Kare (2017)	A Gentleman (2017)

The soundtrack is composed entirely by Sachin–Jigar, while the lyrics were written by Niren Bhatt. The first song "Bhuli Javu Che" was released as a single on 14 June 2017. The song was sung by Sachin Sanghvi, The song received positive reviews and amassed more than a million views on YouTube within 24 hours. "Mauj-E-Dariya" was sung by Benny Dayal, the first Gujarati song sung by him.

Track list
No.	Title	Singer(s)	Length
1.	"Chor Bani Thangaat Kare"	Divya Kumar, Shruti Pathak, Manan Desai	5:16
2.	"Bhuli Javu Che"	Sachin Sanghvi	4:00
3.	"Mauj-E-Dariya"	Benny Dayal	3:20
4.	"Yaad Chhe"	Sachin Sanghvi	4:07
5.	"Bhuli Javu Che (Remix Version)"	Darshan Raval	3:32
