= 102 Not Out =

2018 film by Umesh Shukla

- Theatrical release poster
- Directed by: Umesh Shukla
- Written by: Saumya Joshi
- Produced by: SPE Films India
- Starring: Amitabh Bachchan; Rishi Kapoor; Jimit Trivedi
- Narrated by: Vijay Raaz
- Cinematography: Laxman Utekar
- Edited by: Bodhaditya Banerjee
- Music by: Score: George Joseph; Songs: Salim–Sulaiman; Amitabh Bachchan; Rohan-Vinayak
- Production companies: SPE Films India; Treetop Entertainment; Benchmark Pictures
- Distributed by: Sony Pictures Releasing International
- Release date: 4 May 2018 (India)
- Running time: 102 minutes
- Country: India
- Language: Hindi
- Budget: ₹35 crore
- Box office: est. ₹115.3 crore

102 Not Out is a 2018 Indian Hindi-language comedy drama film directed by Umesh Shukla and written by Saumya Joshi. The film stars Amitabh Bachchan and Rishi Kapoor in lead roles portraying father-son duo for the first time. It also stars Jimit Trivedi in a supporting role.

== Plot ==
Dattatraya Vakharia (Amitabh Bachchan) is a lively 102-year-old who lives his life to the maximum and takes everything in a jovial way for his heart is that of a 26-year-old youngster regardless of his age. His 75-year-old son, Babulal Vakharia (Rishi Kapoor), is his exact opposite for he believes that he is now too old and fragile to enjoy life and lives a routine life. Dhiru (Jimit Trivedi) is an employee at the nearby pharmacy who delivers medicines at the Vakharias' residence. Dattatraya's goal is to break the record of the oldest living person on Earth which is held currently by a Chinese man. He must live for 16 more years to accomplish his goal but has to stay away from negative-minded people for maintaining his health to live that long. Therefore, Dattatraya threatens to send his son to an old age home which makes him worried and disappointed as he is habituated to stay and sleep in his home since these many years. Dattatraya agrees to not send Babulal to the old age home on a condition that Babulal must fulfill certain conditions, which his father would impose on him on a regular basis.

The film revolves on the conditions given to Babulal, which he hesitates to fulfill initially but fulfills them due to the fear of going to the old age home. The conditions imposed on Babulal by his father changes his way of looking at life. The first condition is that Babulal must write a love letter to his deceased wife, Chandrika. After a lot of thinking, he submits the letter to his father, who laughs and enjoys reading the letter. In the second condition, Dattatraya visits Babulal's regular doctor with Babulal and Dhiru, forcing Babulal to accuse the doctor of theft. Dattatraya's idea was to break the connection between Babulal and his doctor so that Babulal stops going to the doctor's clinic daily for a routine checkup. Babulal accepts the condition to stop visiting the doctor's clinic daily without accusing him of theft. Later, Dattatraya tells Babulal that his third condition is to cut holes in his childhood blanket which is immediately rejected by the latter.

One condition that totally changes Babulal's life is when he is sent with Dhiru to certain parts of Mumbai which includes a visit to Juhu Garden in Santacruz and St. Sebastian's Church in Chembur. Dhiru is confused when Babulal feels nostalgic and bursts into tears after visiting the two places. Dattatraya informs Dhiru that he and Babulal regularly visited the garden in Babulal's childhood, and that Babulal and his estranged son, Amol (Dharmendra Gohil), regularly visited the church for prayers. However, after Amol grew up, Babulal sent him to the United States only for his education but the latter settled and got married there instead, and has hardly contacted his father in all these years. After completing all the conditions, Babulal becomes sorrowed and distributes cake to young children on the streets. Babulal also completes the third condition of cutting holes in his childhood blanket and begins seeing life in a jovial way just like his father, leading a delighted Dattatraya to find it easier to complete his mission.

On Babulal's birthday, Amol contacts him but Dattatraya, who considers Amol as a bad influence for Babulal, does not answer the phone call and also does not inform Babulal about it. The same day, the flowers sent by Amol are also intercepted by Dattatraya and not handed over to Babulal. Amol contacts again at night but once again Dattatraya does not inform Babulal about it, and deletes the call history from Babulal's cellphone. The next day, Dattatraya hands over the flowers to Babulal, who becomes upset as they were not handed over to him earlier and contacts Amol to thank him for sending the flowers. Amol informs him about the two missed calls and that he is arriving in India the next month. Babulal gets angry with Dattatraya for withholding this information. Knowing that Amol's motive is to claim himself as the heir to their property, Dattatraya then provides Babulal with his last condition to kick Amol out of the house, to which the latter disagrees for not wishing to behave rudely with his son, resulting in a fallout between them both.

After some days, Babulal enters Dattatraya's room and finds that he has several placards that state words about rebelling Amol's entry into the house. Dattatraya reminds Babulal that his wife, Chandrika, had suffered from Alzheimer's disease in her last 28 days, and the only thing she remembered till her last moment was Amol, who in fact did not even arrive to meet his mother citing lack of proper leave notice at his company. To showcase the greediness of Amol, Dattatraya contacts him and receives an auto reply that Amol is unavailable. He ends up recording the message that he and Babulal have to discuss about property, causing Amol to immediately answer the phone call and Dattatraya convinces him to reach Mumbai on the 19th of that month. Dattatraya begins reading Amol's letters which he had written to Babulal and were intercepted in between by Dattatraya; each letter turns out to be materialistic and ends with "I hope you understand." Despite this, Babulal still informs Dattatraya that he will not follow his last condition, and even Dhiru supports him for the first time, believing that Amol should be given a second chance.

The next day, Babulal gives Dattatraya an affidavit which states that he is transferring his share of property to Amol. Dattatraya finally reveals that he has been diagnosed with brain tumour long back and does not have much time left to live. The old age home and breaking that record was just a ruse because he wished for his son to get rid of his negative approach to life. Babulal finally realises Amol's true intentions, and when Amol arrives in India, Babulal insults and humiliates him in public and demands him to return home from the airport itself. A satisfied Dattatraya then tells Babulal that if there is an Amol then there is Dhiru also, indirectly asking him to accept Dhiru as the replacement for Amol. Dattatraya even tells Babulal to blow a whistle when he dies, to celebrate his outstanding feat, 102 years. At last, 102 not out becomes 102 out and Babulal whistles. Dhiru presents a recorded tape to Babulal with a message that Dattatraya had recorded two days before death. In that message, Dattatraya states that he is sitting in a cloud with the same Chinese man besides him. He is telling the man that the record of the longest living person on Earth will be broken by his son, Babulal, himself after another 43 years.

== Cast ==
- Amitabh Bachchan as Dattatraya Jagjeevan Vakharia: Saraswati's widower; Babu's father; Chandrika's father-in-law; Amol's grandfather; Sujata's grandfather-in-law
- Rishi Kapoor as Babulal Dattatraya Vakharia (Babu): Chandrika's widower; Dattatraya and Saraswati's son; Amol's father; Sujata's father-in-law
- Jimit Trivedi as Dhiru: pharmacy employee and Dattatraya and Babu's friend
- Dharmendra Gohil as Amol Babulal Vakharia: Sujata's husband; Babu and Chandrika's son; Dattatraya and Saraswati's grandson
- Nilesh Pandya as Hasmukh Bhai: Dhiru's employer
- Ashok Pathak as Auto-rickshaw driver (Special Appearance)
- Vijay Raaz as Narrator

== Soundtrack ==
102 Not Out

Soundtrack album by Salim–Sulaiman, Amitabh Bachchan and Rohan-Vinayak
- Released: 30 April 2018
- Recorded: 2017–2018
- Genre: Feature film soundtrack
- Length: 27:49
- Language: Hindi
- Label: Saregama Music
External audio
- Audio Jukebox on YouTube

The music of the film has been composed by Salim–Sulaiman, Amitabh Bachchan and Rohan-Vinayak while the lyrics were written by Hiral Brahmbhatt, Saumya Joshi, Amitabh Bhattacharya and Kaifi Azmi. The songs featured in the film are sung by Arijit Singh, Armaan Malik, Sonu Nigam, Amitabh Bachchan, Rishi Kapoor and Hiral Brahmabhatt. George Joseph has composed the background music for this film. The first song of the film, Bachche Ki Jaan which is sung by Singh was released on 10 April 2018. The second song of the film, Badumbaaa which is sung by Bachchan and Kapoor was released on 18 April 2018. The music album was released on 30 April 2018 by Saregama Music. Vipin Nair of The Hindu gave the soundtrack 3.5/5 stating that Salim-Sulaiman delivered "their best work in a very long time".

Track listing
No.	Title	Lyrics	Music	Singer(s)	Length
1.	"Bachche Ki Jaan"	Hiral Brahmbhatt	Salim–Sulaiman	Arijit Singh	4:49
2.	"Badumbaaa"	Amitabh Bhattacharya	Amitabh Bachchan	Amitabh Bachchan, Rishi Kapoor	5:46
3.	"Kulfi"	Saumya Joshi	Salim-Sulaiman	Sonu Nigam	4:21
4.	"Kuch Anokhe Rules"	Saumya Joshi	Salim-Sulaiman	Armaan Malik	3:33
5.	"Phir Laut Aayi Zindagi"	Hiral Brahmbhatt	Salim-Sulaiman	Hiral Brahmbhatt	4:23
6.	"Waqt Ne Kiya Kya Haseen Sitam"	Kaifi Azmi	Rohan-Vinayak	Amitabh Bachchan	4:57
Total length:					27:49

== Production ==
The make-up for Amitabh Bachchan and Rishi Kapoor is done by makeup and prosthetic artist Preetisheel Singh. Considering the fact that both the actors have to play their characters that are more than their actual age, a lot of prosthetics and makeup were used to make them look like their respective character's age. Bollywood Hungama echoes, "The review would be incomplete without the mention of Preetisheel Singh's makeup, hair and prosthetic. She gives a great look to both the veteran actors which also turns out to be the film's USP."

== Box office ==
In India, the film earned ₹520.5 million nett and ₹667.2 million gross. In China, the film grossed $4.5 million as of 9 December 2018, including $3.25 million (₹226.7 million) during its opening weekend there. In other territories, the film grossed ₹193.3 million ($2 million) as of 3 December 2018. Combined, the film grossed ₹115.3 crore ($12 million) worldwide as of 9 December 2018.

== Critical reception ==
As of October 2021, 102 Not Out holds a 54% approval rating on review aggregator website Rotten Tomatoes, based on 13 reviews with an average rating of 5.5/10.

Rajeev Masand of News18 gave the film a rating of 3 out of 5 saying that, "Despite its many shortcomings 102 Not Out has its heart in the right place, and a pair of actors clearly enjoying themselves on screen. Their infectious energy alone makes this film worth a watch." Rachit Gupta of The Times of India gave the film a rating of 3.5 out of 5 saying that, "The unique and refreshing concept of 102 Not Out is its strength. It's just a happy and healthy entertainer that tells you that living in the moment and making the most of everyday of your life is all that matters." Shalini Langer of The Indian Express gave the film a rating of 2 out of 5 saying that, "No doubt it's great to see a film about two old people. But we have seen both Amitabh Bachchan and Rishi Kapoor in that avatar in better films (Piku especially, and in Kapoor & Sons) before this." Rohit Vats of Hindustan Times gave the film a rating of 3 out of 5 and said that, "102 Not Out's heart is firmly in the right place. The film knows its territory and the emotions it wants to evoke. It's just that a few important characters don't get enough play and they are sacrificed to make space to Amitabh Bachchan and Rishi Kapoor." Raja Sen of NDTV gave the film a rating of 2 out of 5 saying that, "Shukla's film is a sweet but dull enterprise, one that never quite rises above its ultimate ambition: that of having two legendary actors play off each other."

Rohit Bhatnagar of Deccan Chronicle gave the film a rating of 3.5 out of 5 saying that, "The Amitabh Bachchan and Rishi Kapoor starrer film is a heart warming experience of celebrating life as it comes." Namrata Joshi of The Hindu reviewed the film saying that, "Umesh Shukla's film is unable to leave its inherent theatricality behind. It gets unchanging in terms of the give and take between the duo and leaves the viewers static too. It stirs nothing within, leaving you unmoved." Meena Iyer of DNA India gave the film a rating of 3.5 out of 5 saying that, "This is a small, sweet film with its heart in the right place." Anupama Chopra of Film Companion gave the film a rating of 3 out of 5 saying that, "102 Not Out is uneven but heartfelt. Despite the flaws, the emotions connect." Sonil Dedhia of Mid-Day gave the film a rating of 3 out of 5 saying that, "Bachchan and Kapoor's effortless performances, coupled with their intoxicating screen presence make this movie worth watching."
