= Teacher of the Year (2019 film) =

2019 Indian Gujarati drama film

Teacher of the year
- Official poster
- Directed by: Dr. Vikram Panchal; Shounak Vyas
- Written by: Dr. Vikram Panchal; Shounak Vyas
- Produced by: Jayantibhai R Tank; Parth Tank
- Starring: Shounak Vyas; Alisha Prajapati; Mehul Buch; Ragi Jani; Nisarg Trivedi; Archan Trivedi
- Cinematography: Tapan Vyas
- Edited by: Nirav Panchal
- Music by: Prathmesh Bhatt
- Production company: Parth Tank Production
- Distributed by: Rupam Entertainment Pvt. Ltd
- Release date: 13 September 2019
- Running time: 157 minutes
- Country: India
- Language: Gujarati

Teacher of the Year (Gujarati: ટીચર ઓફ ઘી યર) is a 2019 Gujarati drama film directed by Dr. Vikram Panchal, Shounak Vyas and produced by Jayantibhai R Tank and Parth Tank under the banner of Parth Tank Production. It is a reboot of the 2014 film of the same name. The film starring Shounak Vyas, Alisha Prajapati, Mehul Buch, Ragi Jani, Nisarg Trivedi and Archan Trivedi, has music by Prathmesh Bhatt. The story of the film revolves around the relationship between a teacher and his students and the struggles faced by them. It was released on 13 September 2019 by Rupam Entertainment.

== Cast ==
- Shounak Vyas as Parth
- Alisha Prajapati as Reva
- Mehul Buch as Professor Shastri
- Ragi Jani as Iqbal shaikh
- Nisarg Trivedi as Gaurishankar
- Archan Trivedi as Mehul Bhai
- Chaitanyakrishna Raval as Chaitanya
- Jiya Bhatt as Bulbul
- Jitendra Thakkar as Sutta bhai
- Jahnvi Chauhan as Swati
- Raunaq Kamdar as Anchor
- Premal Yagnik as Shankar Sodha
- Rekha Mukharjee as Rekha
- Pranay Mehta as Hari Mehta
- Parmeshwar Sirsikar as Himmatsinh Rathod
- Karan Patel as Junior Parth
- Jash Thakkar as Jago
- Ankit Gajera as Samant
- Yuvraj Gadhvi as Jatin
- Charmi Jani as Maya
- Himadry Joshi as Julie
- Antra Thkkar as Muskan

== Production ==
Teacher of the year shot in Ahmedabad. The music for the film is given by Prathmesh Bhatt. Songs have been sung by Kirtidan Gadhvi, sunny shah, and chorused by kids. The lyrics of the song have been written by Anil Chavda, Tejas Dave and Shounak Vyas. The shoot of the film was completed in 2019.

== Release ==
The trailer of the film was released on 22 August 2019.

The film was released on 13 September 2019.
