= Parth Bharat Thakkar =

Indian music composer

- Born: Ahmedabad, Gujarat, India
- Occupations: Music director; Composer; Singer
- Years active: 1999–present

Parth Bharat Thakkar is a music director and singer from Gujarati cinema. He is known for his works in Gujjubhai the Great, Chhello Divas, Daav Thai Gayo Yaar and Love Ni Bhavai.

Parth is also known for his music composition of the song "Mann Melo" from the 2018 Gujarati romantic film Sharato Lagu. The song was highly acclaimed by critics as well as audiences.

== Early life ==
Parth did his schooling from St. Xavier's School, Mirzapur and St. Kabir School, Ahmedabad. He graduated from JG College of Performing Arts, Ahmedabad with Bachelor in Performing Arts.

Parth started learning music at the age of three. At the age of 20, he composed a music album called Majja Ni Life for RJ Dhvanit from Radio Mirchi, Ahmedabad.

== Career ==
Parth debuted as a music director with the film Gujjubhai The Great directed by Ishaan Randeria. The film was released on 18 September 2015, to positive reviews and became a box-office success. Later he worked with film, Chhello Divas – A New Beginning, written and directed by Krishnadev Yagnik. The film premiered on 20 November 2015 with positive reviews from critics and was a huge commercial success. Later he went to do many successful projects like Daav Thai Gayo Yaar, Love Ni Bhavai, GujjuBhai - Most Wanted, Sharato Lagu and so on. He is currently working on the movie Luv Ni Love Storys which will be releasing on 31 January 2020.

== Discography ==
=== Feature film soundtracks ===
- Bey Yaar
- Gujjubhai The Great
- Chhello Divas
- Love Ni Bhavai
- Ventilator
- GujjuBhai - Most Wanted
- Sharato Lagu
- Luv Ni Love Storys
- Gajab Thai Gayo!
- Nayika Devi: The Warrior Queen
- Lakiro
- Hello!
- Bachubhai
- Hurry Om Hurry
- Vahali
- Vande Bharat Via USA
