= Gajab Thai Gayo! =

2022 Indian Gujarati film

- Directed by: Neeraj Joshi
- Written by: Neeraj Joshi
- Produced by: Bhavesh Patel; Pranav Shah; Atul Patel; Jignesh Patel
- Starring: Malhar Thakar; Pooja Jhaveri; Ujjwal Chopra
- Cinematography: Suraj C Kurade
- Music by: Parth Bharat Thakkar
- Production company: Infi9 Motions Pvt Ltd
- Release date: 7 April 2022
- Running time: 131 minutes
- Country: India
- Language: Gujarati

Gajab Thai Gayo! is a 2022 Indian Gujarati-language science fiction comedy children's film written and directed by Neeraj Joshi. The film stars Malhar Thakar, Pooja Jhaveri and Ujjwal Chopra in lead roles.

== Plot ==
Bhagirath, a post graduate from a reputed university, offers to teach students for free in their mother tongue at Sheth Kapurchand Mangaldas Vidyalaya, one of the last existing Gujarati medium schools. The principal is struggling to keep the school running. Vishwa, principal's daughter and a teacher, does not trust Bhagirath as his teaching methods are unconventional. Bhagirath, Vishwa and students travel to nearby village. They stumble upon a relic which takes them on an adventure of a lifetime beyond space and time.

== Cast ==
- Malhar Thakar as Bhagirath Jatashankar Narbheram/Bhajan
- Pooja Jhaveri as Vishwa
- Ujjwal Chopra as Raghuram
- Sunil Vishrani as Tom
- Vaibhav Biniwale as Mama
- Kahan Mistry as Virat
- Khush Tahilramani as Anant
- Sneha Chauhan as Paheli
- Shraddha Suthar as Jerry

== Production ==
The film stars Malhar Thakar, Pooja Jhaveri and Ujjwal Chopra in lead roles. This children's film incorporates science fiction, comedy, thriller and adventure elements. More than a hundred school children were cast in the film.

== Soundtrack ==
Gajab Thai Gayo !

Soundtrack album by Parth Bharat Thakkar
- Released: 2022
- Recorded: 2022
- Genre: Feature film soundtrack
- Length: 5:37
- Language: Gujarati
- Label: Tips Gujarati
- Producer: Bharat Patel; Pranav Shah; Atul Patel; Jignesh Patel

All music is composed by Parth Bharat Thakkar

Track listing
No.	Title	Lyrics	Singer(s)	Length
1.	"Koi Mane Prem Shikvado Re"	Priya Saraiya	Jasleen Royal; Aditya Gadhvi	3:06
2.	"Kutuhal"	Niren Bhatt	Siddharth Amit Bhavsar	2:31
Total length:				5:37

The Tips Industries acquired the music rights of the film. According to Soumitra Das of The Times of India, the music was well received by the audience.

== Release ==
The motion poster was released on 4 March 2022. The Tips Industries released the trailer on 21 March 2022. The film was released on 7 April 2022.

== Reception ==
Chintan Modi of News9 criticised the film incoherent script and direction. He also called acting "lacklustre" and the film "underwhelming". Siraj Syed writing for FilmFestivals rated it 2.5 out of 5. He praised the themes, VFX, acting and music but criticised plot, editing and length. Prakhar Pateriya of Vibes of India praised it as an experimental sci-fi film.

== See also ==
- Science fiction films in India
