= Luv Ni Love Storys =

2020 Gujarati Film

- Official poster
- Directed by: Durgesh Tanna
- Written by: Durgesh Tanna
- Produced by: Manish Andani; Karim Minsariya
- Starring: Pratik Gandhi; Deeksha Joshi; Vyoma Nandi; Shraddha Dangar; Hardik Sangani
- Edited by: Nirav Panchal
- Music by: Parth Bharat Thakkar
- Release date: January 31, 2020
- Running time: 142 minutes
- Country: India
- Language: Gujarati

Luv Ni Love Storys is a 2020 Gujarati romantic comedy-drama film written and directed by Durgesh Tanna. The film is produced by Manish Andani and Karim Minsariya under the banner of Swissk Entertainment and DB Talkies. The music and background scores are composed by Parth Bharat Thakkar with lyrics from Niren Bhatt and Aaditya Gadhavi. The casting director of the film is Avani Soni and the film stars Pratik Gandhi, Shraddha Dangar, Deeksha Joshi, Vyoma Nandi and Hardik Sangani in leading roles.

== Plot ==
The plot revolves around a young, loving and charming man Luv Modi. The story starts from Luv narrating his love stories and how he encountered love in different forms. Luv was the most loved and pampered child, his grandmother, his mother and his aunt were very fond of him. But Luv's father used to be jealous at times due to this. As a result, Luv was sent away at boarding school. He returned after 14 years completing his school as well as Hotel Management course. He had a best friend Saumitra. From here, Luv's first love story starts. He catches sight of his neighbour, Mishti and instantly falls for her. Later, Luv and Mishti meet again at his house when she doesn't recognize him and mistakes him as servant but Luv catches Mishti's attention by his witty sense and cooking skills, they become quick friends. As time passes, Mishti learns that Luv is a good man and his point of view on women is quite different from others. Luv starts developing feelings for Mishti as he thinks she also likes him, he mockingly tells her that he will help her elope with the guy she loves when Mishti tells him that she loves a guy like Luv, which increases his hopes. However on the engagement ceremony of Luv's sister, Sweetu, he discovers that Mishti loves a boy called Prem (the guy she told about Luv to, he's the one like Luv). She requests Luv to flee her for Prem as her family won't allow her to marry him. A heavy-hearted, Luv decides to help Mishti to run off with her lover. He also manages to convince Mishti's family to accept Mishti and Prem. This is how Luv's first love remains one-sided.

Later, Luv moves to Mumbai. There he goes on dates with multiple girls but none are his type. Later, he meets another girl, again his neighbour, Sonam and they become friends. Sonam and Luv spend most of time together. when they're invited into a wedding of Sonam's best friend's sister as wedding photographer, on the way to there, Luv starts liking Sonam (because again such events happen in which Sonam gets possessive for Luv etc.) but when Luv confesses his feelings, Sonam angrily rejects him and decides to break the friendship, to which, Luv confronts Sonam and leaves Mumbai. Again this love story remains one-sided.

It is then shown that Luv was narrating all this to a marriage prospect, Preeti who finds his stories very interesting but Luv 's perspective was quite changed. He now believes that he should marry and settle as love can happen even after marriage. Preeti tells she would marry Luv but she says no when asked by her parents on being married. She calls Luv taking the name of Sonam in a café to meet him and tells him she was testing if he still loves Sonam and wants to marry someone else. Then she reveals she declined the marriage, but is interested in dating him to which Luv responds he is now no more interested in such things as he's tired. But Preeti tells him she would wait for him. Luv's mother suggests him to give himself one more chance and Luv gets over his previous love story and gives a shot on Preeti. But now Preeti tells him she isn't interested and confuses him. Sumitra gives advice to Luv to impress Preeti by various means. Lastly, Luv directly asks what really Preeti wants, she tells him she wants the old Luv, the original Luv. Luv understands what she means and starts to be with her being the Luv he was, cheerful and loving. Luv fells in love with Preeti but is afraid to tell her. Preeti tells Luv that wants to take a test of him, she tells him to stay away from her to know if he really loves her, misses her or its just attachment and after that she'll giver her answer. But Saumitra helps Luv as he couldn't be in peace without meeting Preeti, he finds a ways impress Preeti by various means but this time being the true Luv and in his own methods. Preeti invites Luv and his family to the 25th wedding anniversary of her parents. But to Luv's horror surprise, Sonam is the photographer appointed there. Sonam apologizes to Luv and says she really misses him which again muddles Luv and its revealed that Sonam and Preeti are cousins. Luv gets confused and then Preeti reveals she invited Sonam to test Luv. Frustrated and irritated Luv, confronts Preeti and is about to leave the party when Preeti gives a speech on her parents marriage and also starts narrating her love story that how she fell in love with Luv but due to the previous events, Luv had forgotten his identity and she wanted him to make him realise who actually he was. she tested him multiple times and passes every test but she also realised she crossed the limit by calling Sonam. However she clarifies that it was a test for both Preeti and Luv, what if Luv was still in love with Sonam, it would have broken Preeti too. But after that she has no doubts and proposes Luv for marriage, Luv accepts her agrees to marry her. Then Luv narrates this love story to his son and the film closes on happy note.

== Cast ==
- Pratik Gandhi as Luv Modi
- Deeksha Joshi as Preeti
- Vyoma Nandi as Sonam
- Shraddha Dangar as Mishti
- Hardik Sangani as Saumitra
- Mehul Buch as Luv's father
- Alpana Buch as Luv's mother
- Bhavini Jani as Luv's grandmother
- Harikrishna Dave as Luv's uncle
- Vandana Vithlani as Luv's aunt
- Tarjani Bhadla as Luv's sister
- Bhavya Sirohi as Luv's sister
- Saurabh Rajyaguru as Prem (Mishti's boyfriend)

== Soundtrack ==
Luv Ni Love Storys

Soundtrack album by Parth Bharat Thakkar
- Released: 28 December 2019
- Recorded: 2019
- Genre: Feature film soundtrack
- Length: 17:15
- Language: Gujarati
- Label: Jazz Digital
- Producer: D. B. Talkies

Audio
- Official Audio Jukebox on YouTube

All music is composed by Parth Bharat Thakkar.

Track listing
| No. | Title | Lyrics | Singer(s) | Length |
|---|---|---|---|---|
| 1. | "Ghoome Jaaye Re" | Niren Bhatt | Siddharth Amit Bhavsar | 3:50 |
| 2. | "Manzil" | Niren Bhatt | Keerthi Sagathia, Aditya Gadhvi, Siddharth Amit Bhavsar | 4:02 |
| 3. | "Aasmani" | Niren Bhatt | Yashita Sharma | 4:02 |
| 4. | "Luv Ni Love Storys" | Aditya Gadhvi | Aditya Gadhvi, Siddharth Amit Bhavsar, Yashika Sikka | 2:47 |
| 5. | "Ghoome Jaaye Re - Reprise" | Niren Bhatt | Yashika Sikka | 2:34 |
| Total length: | | | | 17:15 |

== Release ==
The film released on 31 January 2020.

The Times of India gave the film 3.5 out of five stars and states that "Durgesh Tanna's multi-starrer film is a perfect family drama with a strong focus on different hues of love". BollyBonda gave the film four out of five stars and wrote that "Luv ni Love Storys is a good romantic comedy with likable characters and a decent amount of laughs".
