= Aum Mangalam Singlem =

2022 Gujarati language film

- Official poster
- Directed by: Saandeep Patel
- Written by: Mitai Shukla; Nehal Bakshi
- Produced by: Aarti Patel
- Starring: Malhar Thakar; Aarohi Patel; Tatsat Munshi; Bhamini Oza; Darshan Jariwala
- Cinematography: Tapan Vyas
- Edited by: Prateek Gupta
- Music by: Sachin–Jigar
- Production company: Rupam Entertainment
- Distributed by: Rupam Entertainment
- Release date: 18 November 2022 (India)
- Running time: 174 minutes
- Country: India
- Language: Gujarati

Aum Mangalam Singlem is a 2022 Gujarati romantic comedy film directed by Saandeep Patel. It stars Malhar Thakar, Aarohi Patel, Tatsat Munshi, Bhamini Oza Gandhi, Darshan Jariwala and Nisarg Trivedi in lead roles.

== Synopsis ==
Childhood friends and sweethearts are ready to get married. But they also want to experience being single before taking the plunge.

== Cast ==
The following cast members are in the film:

- Malhar Thakar as Siddharth
- Aarohi Patel as Vaani
- Bhamini Oza Gandhi as Ishita
- Tatsat Munshi as Max
- Darshan Jariwala
- Nisarg Trivedi
- Arati Patel
- Sanjay Galsar
- Devangi
- Ravi Gohil
- Jaini Shah
- Nilesh Parmar
- Rehan Meghani

== Production ==
Thakar and Aarohi were previously starred in 2017 romantic comedy film Love Ni Bhavai directed by Saandeep Patel. The team has now reunited for this film. The film was shot in Ahmedabad and in Polo Forest.

== Soundtrack ==
Aum Mangalam Singlem

Soundtrack album by Sachin–Jigar
- Released: 9 November 2022
- Genre: Feature film soundtrack
- Length: 32:59
- Label: Akshar Communications

Aum Mangalam Singlem music is composed by duo of Sachin–Jigar.

All lyrics are written by Niren Bhatt; all music is composed by Sachin–Jigar.

Track list
| No. | Title | Singer(s) | Length |
|---|---|---|---|
| 1. | "Saavariya" | Varun Jain | 3:32 |
| 2. | "Sahiyar" | Jigardan Gadhavi, Nayana Sarma | 4:27 |
| 3. | "Khune Thi Khune Thi" | Ishani Dave, Aamir Mir, Divya Kumar | 5:41 |
| 4. | "Latko" | Bhoomi Trivedi | 3:45 |
| 5. | "Aum Mangalam Singlem (Title Track)" | Aghori Muzik | 2:35 |
| 6. | "Saavariya (Upbeat Version)" | Siddharth Amit Bhavsar | 2:46 |
| 7. | "Saavariya (Marriage Version)" | Jesal Desai | 1:23 |
| 8. | "Saavariya (Trust-Fall Version)" | Varun Jain | 1:57 |
| 9. | "Sahiyar (Male)" | Jigardan Gadhavi | 2:49 |
| 10. | "Sahiyar (Female)" | Nayana Sarma | 1:44 |
| 11. | "Khune Thi Khune Thi (Symphony Version)" | Ishani Dave, Aamir Mir, Divya Kumar | 2:15 |

== Marketing and release ==
The poster and trailer were released on 13 and 14 October 2022 respectively. The film was released on 18 November 2022.

== Reception ==
=== Box office ===
The film ran for 25 weeks in the theatres.

=== Critical reception ===
Yesha Bhatt of The Times of India rated it 4 out of 5. She praised performances, story, theme, music, choreography and songs. Rachana Joshi writing for Mid-Day Gujarati rated it 4 out of 5 and praised the director, script, performances and music.
