= Malhar Thakar =

Indian actor (born 1990)

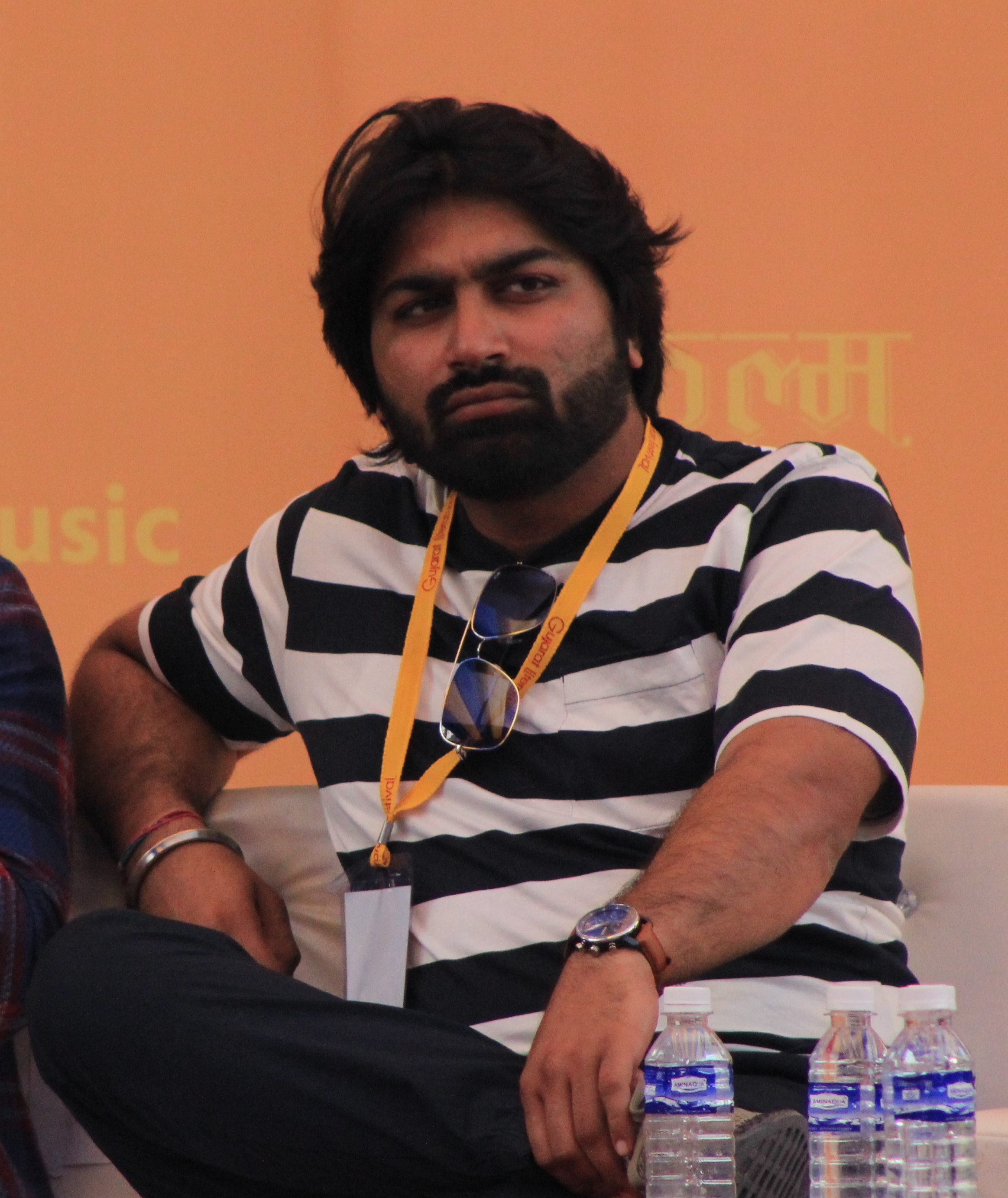
- Malhar Thakar at Gujarat Literature Festival, Vadodara in 2019
- Born: 28 June 1990 (age 36); Siddhpur, Gujarat, India
- Occupation: Actor
- Spouse: Puja Joshi (m. 2024)
- Relatives: Allok Thakar (brother)

Malhar Thakar (born 28 June 1990) is an Indian actor who primarily works in the Gujarati film industry and theatre.

== Biography ==
He studied at Navrang School (Navrangpura, Ahmedabad) and Sheth C. N. Vidyalaya, Ahmedabad.

After nine years in theatre, he entered the Gujarati film industry. His debut film as the lead role was Chhello Divas (2015) which was commercially successful. His Love Ni Bhavai (2017) achieved critical and commercial success and ran for more than 100 days in theatres. Golkeri (2020) was also declared hit.

In 2018, Thakar started his own production house, Ticket Window Entertainment. In April 2020, he announced the establishment of an NGO to help people affected during the COVID-19 pandemic in India. He debuted in Hindi cinema with his supporting role in Maja Ma (2022).

He married actress Puja Joshi on 26 November 2024.

== Filmography ==
=== Television and web series ===
Year	Title	Language	Episodes/Seasons	Role	Network	Notes
2013	Taarak Mehta Ka Ooltah Chashmah	Hindi	1 Episode	Parag	Sony SAB	
2019	Do Not Disturb	Gujarati	2 Seasons	Maulik	MX Player	
2021	Vaat Vaat Ma	Gujarati	2 Seasons	Swayam	ShemarooMe	
2022	Jee Karda	Hindi	1 Season	Sameer Kotadiya	Amazon Prime Video	
2023	Scoop	Hindi	1 Season	Ajitesh Bhatt	Netflix	

=== Films ===
Year	Title	Role	Language	Notes
2012	Kevi Rite Jaish	A guy at visa office	Gujarati	
2015	Chhello Divas	Vicky	Gujarati	
2016	Thai Jashe!	Pranav Joshi	Gujarati	
2016	Passport	Kabir	Gujarati	
2017	Duniyadari	Meet Mehta	Gujarati	
2017	Cash On Delivery	Siddharth	Gujarati	
2017	Love Ni Bhavai	Sagar	Gujarati	
2018	Mijaaj	Jay	Gujarati	
2018	Vandha Vilas		Gujarati	Guest role
2018	Reva	Traveller	Gujarati	Guest role
2018	Shu Thayu?	Manan	Gujarati	
2018	Ventilator	Funeral manager	Gujarati	Cameo
2018	Sharato Lagu	Satyavrat	Gujarati	
2018	Midnights with Menka	Malhar Thakar	Gujarati	
2019	Saheb	Malhar	Gujarati	
2020	Golkeri	Sahil Sutariya	Gujarati	
2021	Swagatam	Manav Mehta	Gujarati	released on ShemarooMe
2021	Dhuandhaar	Aarav	Gujarati	
2021	Dhummas	Manav	Gujarati	Guest role, released on Amazon Prime Video
2022	Gajab Thai Gayo!	Bhagirath Jatashankar Narbheram	Gujarati	
2022	Sonu Tane Mara Par Bharoso Nai Ke	Kartik	Gujarati	
2022	Vickida No Varghodo	Vikas alias Vicky	Gujarati	
2022	Veer-Isha Nu Seemant	Veer	Gujarati	
2022	Maja Ma	Pinakin	Hindi	released on Amazon Prime Video
2022	Aum Mangalam Singlem	Sidhharth	Gujarati	
2023	Shubh Yatra	Mohan	Gujarati	
2023	Gulaam Chor	Sanjay Shukla	Gujarati	released on JioCinema.
2023	3 Ekka	Kalrav/Colour	Gujarati	
2024	Lagan Special	Shekhar	Gujarati	
2024	Vanilla Ice Cream	Varun	Gujarati	
2024	Locha Laapsi	Bhaskar	Gujarati	
2025	All The Best Pandya	Akshay Pandya	Gujarati	
2025	Malik Ni Varta		Gujarati	
2025	Jai Mata Ji - Let's Rock		Gujarati	
2025	Vande Bharat Via USA	Rahul	Gujarati	
2026	Lagan Laagii Re	Kartik	Gujarati	
2026	Chatni	Deval	Gujarati	

== Plays ==
- 5 Star Aunty
- Maari Wife Mary Kom
