= Apara Mehta =

Indian television and Bollywood actress (born 1960)

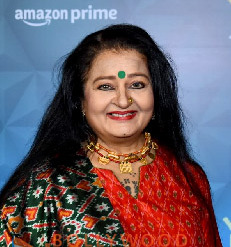
- Mehta in 2023
- Born: Apara Mehta
- Occupation: Actress
- Years active: 1975–present
- Spouse: Darshan Jariwala (m. 1980; sep. 2003)
- Children: Khushali Jariwala
- Parent(s): Ushakant Mehta (Father) and Mandakini Mehta (Mother)

Apara Mehta is an Indian television and Bollywood actress most famously known for playing Tulsi's mother in law Savita Mansukh Virani in the iconic show Kyunki Saas Bhi Kabhi Bahu Thi.

== Personal life ==
Born in Bhavnagar, Gujarat, Apara is the only child of her parents, and no stranger to being a performing artist. She started learning classical music and Kathak from a young age. At the age of 15, she hosted a children's television programme for Ahmedabad Doordarshan.

In 1980 she married Indian television and film personality Darshan Jariwala, with whom she has one daughter. The two have mutually separated but are not legally divorced. Excerpts about their personal life were shown in the reality show Maa Exchange, which aired on Sony Entertainment Television.

Her career naturally veered towards theatre as she married into a theatre family.

== Theatrical career ==
Mehta has worked on stage since 1981. She has acted in over 150 plays in various roles. She has found a constant career in plays.

== Television career ==
Apara started her television career anchoring a children's programme called Santakukdi for Mumbai Doordarshan at the age of 15. Her first major break was in Ek Mahal Ho Sapno Ka (1999), in which she played Paro. Her greater success came with Ekta Kapoor's blockbuster Kyunki Saas Bhi Kabhi Bahu Thi (2000-06), in which she played Savita Mansukh Virani (mother-in-law of lead character Tulsi) on StarPlus. She then appeared in a negative role as Kukki Kaaki in Saat Phere (2006) and other soaps like Parrivaar (2007), Dhak Dhak In Dubai (2007), Dillagi, Alpviram, Hum Hain Anari, Love Marriage and Chandan Ka Palna. She also did comedy roles in Sajan Re Jhoot Mat Bolo (2009-12) as Damini Devi Diwan, Golmaal Hai Bhai Sab Golmaal Hai (2012) as Pari on SAB TV and as Leela in Hamari Saas Leela (2011) on Colors TV.

She also played supporting roles in some Bollywood films. She played a role in Firangi Bahu on Colors TV. She used to appear in Tu Mere Agal Bagal Hai as Basundi on SAB TV. She was on the weekend horror/thriller fiction show Qayamat Ki Raat on Star Plus in 2018. She appeared in Yeh Rishta Kya Kehlata Hai (2021), Bhabiji Ghar Par Hain! (2018) and Sai-Shraddha aur Saburi. She played Manmita Chaddha in Choti Sarrdaarni (2021) and later appeared in Maddam Sir (2022).

== Television ==
Year	Title	Role	Language	Notes	Ref.
1998	Alpviram		Hindi		
1999	Ek Mahal Ho Sapno Ka		Hindi		
2000–2006	Kyunki Saas Bhi Kabhi Bahu Thi	Savita Mansukh Virani	Hindi		
2001	Chandan Ka Palna Resham Ki Dori	Kusum	Hindi		
2004	Khichdi		Hindi	Guest Appearance	
2006	Saat Phere	Kukki Kaki	Hindi		
2006	Karam Apnaa Apnaa		Hindi		
2007	Parrivaar		Hindi		
2007	Dhak Dhak In Dubai		Hindi		
2009	Raja Ki Aayegi Baraat		Hindi		
2009–2012	Sajan Re Jhoot Mat Bolo	Damini Devi Diwan	Hindi		
2011	Hamari Saas Leela	Leela	Hindi		
2012–2013	Kya Huaa Tera Vaada	Suhasi Alok Singh	Hindi		
2012	Golmaal Hai Bhai Sab Golmaal Hai	Pari	Hindi		
2013–2014	Firangi Bahu		Hindi		
2014–2016	Jamai Raja	Alaknanda	Hindi		
2014	Tu Mere Agal Bagal Hai	Basundi	Hindi		
2016	Woh Teri Bhabhi Hai Pagle	Mrs. Dilwale	Hindi		
2016	Naya Mahisagar	Tiwari Mehta	Hindi		
2016	Brahmarakshas	Jasmit	Hindi		
2017	Bakula Bua Ka Bhoot	Rekha	Hindi		
2018	Qayamat Ki Raat	Madhuri Thakur	Hindi		
2018	Mere Sai – Shraddha Aur Saburi	Jhimri 's aunt	Hindi		
2018	Bhabiji Ghar Par Hain!	Alpaa	Hindi		
2021	Yeh Rishta Kya Kehlata Hai		Hindi	Cameo	
2021	Indiawali Maa	Kesar Masi	Hindi		
2021	Choti Sarrdaarni	Manmita Chaddha	Hindi		
2022	Maddam Sir	Sarita Singh	Hindi		
2022	Jai Hanuman - Sankat Mochan Naam Tiharo	Maiya Kaki	Hindi		
2022	Anandibaa Aur Emily	Jaibala	Hindi		
2023	Anupamaa	Gurumaa Malti Devi	Hindi		
2024–2025	United State Of Gujarat	Indira	Gujarati		
2025; 2026	Kyunki Saas Bhi Kabhi Bahu Thi 2	Savita Mansukh Virani	Hindi	Guest Appearance	
2026	Do Duniya Ek Dil	Gauri Singh Chauhan	Hindi		

== Filmography ==
- Yeh Teraa Ghar Yeh Meraa Ghar (2001) - Dayashankar's elder sister
- Chori Chori Chupke Chupke (2001) - Prostitute
- Devdas (2002 Hindi film) (2002) - Badi Aapa
- Just Married (2007)
- Tees Maar Khan (2010) - Tabrez Mirza Khan's (Tees Maar Khan) mother
- Bachubhai (2023) - Gujarati Film
