= Niren Bhatt =

Indian lyricist and writer

- Born: Mumbai, Maharashtra, India
- Occupations: Lyricist; screenwriter
- Years active: 2008–present

Niren Bhatt is an Indian screenwriter and lyricist who works predominantly in Hindi films. He has written the films for the Maddock Horror Comedy Universe, most notably Stree 2 (2024), which became one of the highest-grossing Hindi films of all time.

== Early life ==
Bhatt holds a Master in Engineering and Business Administration. Before working in the film industry, he worked as a business consultant. In 2011, he left his corporate job to pursue a career in screenwriting.

== Career ==
Bhatt initially wrote commercials and Gujarati plays. Later, he began writing for television and films but had mixed reception from audiences. His breakthrough came with writing for long running sitcom Taarak Mehta Ka Ooltah Chashmah. He wrote the script and penned the lyrics for the Gujarati film Bey Yaar (2014) which was a commercial success. He wrote several Gujarati films including Wrong Side Raju (2016) and Ventilator (2018) and wrote the lyrics for several songs including music albums in Hindi and Gujarati. He wrote Made in China (2019) for director Mikhil Musale and the Netflix production Serious Men (2020) adapting a novel of the same name. Following the success of 2019 Hindi film Bala, he made his breakthrough and began his long association with producer Amar Kaushik. He is credited as the co-creator of Maddock Supernatural Universe along with Amar Kaushik for which he wrote Bhediya (2022), Munjya (2024) and Stree 2 (2024).

He is also the screenwriter of web series' such as Asur (2020), Ray (2021) and Inside Edge (2017). He wrote two episodes; Spotlight and Hangama Hain Kyon Barpa, the latter being an Urdu episode; of Ray.

== Filmography ==
=== Films ===
List of Niren Bhatt film credits
Year	Title	Lyricist	Writer	Language
2014	Fugly	Yes	No	Hindi
2014	Gollu Aur Pappu	Yes	No	Hindi
2014	Bey Yaar	Yes	No	Gujarati
2015	All Is Well	Yes	No	Hindi
2016	Wrong Side Raju	Yes	Yes	Gujarati
2016	Daav Thai Gayo	Yes	No	Gujarati
2016	Tuu To Gayo	Yes	No	Gujarati
2017	Duniyadari	Yes	No	Gujarati
2017	Chor Bani Thangaat Kare	Yes	No	Gujarati
2017	Tamburo	Yes	No	Gujarati
2017	Pappa Tamne Nahi Samjaay	Yes	No	Gujarati
2017	Best of Luck Laalu	Yes	No	Gujarati
2017	Love Ni Bhavai	Yes	No	Gujarati
2018	Gujjubhai Most Wanted	Yes	No	Gujarati
2018	Ventilator	Yes	Yes	Gujarati
2018	Loveyatri	Yes	Yes	Hindi
2018	Sharato Lagu	Yes	No	Gujarati
2019	Chaal Jeevi Laiye!	Yes	No	Gujarati
2019	Saheb	Yes	No	Gujarati
2019	Dhunki	Yes	No	Gujarati
2019	Luv Ni Love Storys	Yes	No	Gujarati
2019	Made in China	Yes	Yes	Hindi
2019	Bala	Yes	No	Hindi
2020	Serious Men	No	Additional screenplay	Hindi
2022	Gajab Thai Gayo!	Yes	No	Gujarati
2022	Prem Prakaran	Yes	No	Gujarati
2022	Vickida No Varghodo	Yes	No	Gujarati
2022	Hey Kem Chho London	Yes	No	Gujarati
2022	Chabutro	Yes	No	Gujarati
2022	Aum Mangalam Singlem	Yes	No	Gujarati
2022	Bhediya	No	Yes	Hindi
2024	Munjya	No	Yes	Hindi
2024	Stree 2	No	Yes	Hindi
2024	The Buckingham Murders	Yes	No	Hindi
2025	Sky Force	No	Yes	Hindi
2025	Thamma	No	Yes	Hindi
2026	Lagan Laagii Re	Yes	No	Gujarati
2026	Satluj	No	Yes	Hindi

=== Television ===
List of Niran Bhatt television credits
Year	Series Name	Credited as	Language	Platform
2008-2019	Taarak Mehta Ka Ooltah Chashmah (3163 episodes)	Screenwriter	Hindi	Sony SAB
2012–present	Savdhaan India	Screenwriter	Hindi	Life OK
2012	Bhai Bhaiya Aur Brother	Screenwriter	Hindi	Sony SAB
2012-2014	Jeannie Aur Juju (406 episodes)	Screenwriter	Hindi	Sony SAB
2019	Inside Edge (10 episodes)	Screenwriter	Hindi	Amazon Prime Video
2020	Asur: Welcome to your dark side (8 episodes)	Screenwriter	Hindi	Voot
2021	Ray (2 episodes)	Screenwriter, actor	Hindi	Netflix

== Accolades ==
65th Filmfare Awards

- Best Dialogue – Nominated

68th Filmfare Awards

- Best Story – Nominated
