= Mehul Buch =

Indian television actor

- Occupation: Actor
- Years active: 1997–present
- Spouse: Alpana Buch (m. 1995)
- Children: 1

Mehul Buch is an Indian actor who works in Hindi and Gujarati stage, film and television productions.

== Personal life ==
He is married to Alpana Buch, an actress, and has a daughter, Bhavya.

== Filmography ==
=== Hindi Films ===
Year	Film	Role	Notes
2000	Ghaath	Hiten	
2002	Filhaal...		
2002	Mere Yaar Ki Shaadi Hai	Ajit	
2008	Maan Gaye Mughal-e-Azam		
2010	Ashok Chakra: Tribute to Real Heroes	Investigating Officer	
2015	Kuch Kuch Locha Hai	Velji (Praveen's best friend)	
2017	Union Leader		
2017	A Daughter's Tale Pankh		
2019	Teacher of the year	Principal	

=== Gujarati Films ===
Year	Film	Role	Notes
2018	Ventilator		
2018	Suryansh	Vikram Rana	
2018	Family Circus	Riya's father	
2019	Teacher of the Year	Professor Shastri	
2020	Luv Ni Love Storys	Luv's father	
2025	Shubhchintak		
2025	Goti Lo	Diwan Saheb	

=== Television ===
Year	Serial	Role	Channel	Notes
1997	Saturday Suspense - Khauf		Zee TV	Episode 39
1998	X Zone - Sunanda		Zee TV	Episodes 15-16
	Rishtey	Episode 51	Zee TV	
2003	Kumkum - Ek Pyara Sa Bandhan	Vikram Malhotra	Star Plus	
	Baa Bahoo Aur Baby	Devendra Marfatia	Star Plus	
2007-2009	Ghar Ek Sapnaa	Dhanraj Saxena	Sahara One	
2007	Prem Panth	Mihir		
2008-2009	Shree	Narottam	Zee TV	
2010-2011	Sanjog Se Bani Sangini	Raajrani's husband	Zee TV	
2011-2014	The Command Force	Chief	DD National	
2011-13	Sukanya Hamari Betiyan	Prof. Deepak Verma	DD National	
2012	Savdhaan India	Dr Vipul Sheth (Episode 1290)	Star Bharat	
2012-2014	Pyaar Ka Dard Hai Meetha Meetha Pyaara Pyaara	Anuj Deewan	Star Plus	
2015	Apani Vache Dariya			Gujarati series
2016	Khidki		SAB TV	
2017	Taarak Mehta Ka Ooltah Chashmah	Cheda	SAB TV	
2018-2020	Kullfi Kumarr Bajewala	Tony Chaddha	Star Plus	
2020–2021	Durga – Mata Ki Chhaya	Alok Aneja	Star Bharat	
2021	Crime Alert	Avinash Bansal	Dangal TV	Episodic role
2021	Balika Vadhu 2	Devraj Anjaariya	Colors TV	
2022–2023	Woh Toh Hai Albelaa	Dhanraj Choudhary	Star Bharat	
2023–2024	Doree	Mahendra Thakur	Colors TV	

=== Web series ===
Year	Title	Role	Notes
2022	Anupama: Namaste America	Mr. Dhamecha	
