= Aishwarya Majmudar =

Indian singer

- Genres: Bollywood, Hindustani classical
- Occupation: Singer
- Instruments: Vocal
- Years active: 2008–present
- Website: www.aishwaryamajmudar.com

Aishwarya Majmudar is an Indian singer. Majmudar won the 2007–08 musical reality show STAR Voice of India - Chhote Ustad at the age of 15. She also took part in Music Ka Maha Muqabala on Himesh Reshamiya's "Himesh's Warriors" team. Since then she has featured as a playback singer for a variety of Bollywood films and performs traditional Gujarati songs.

== Career ==
Majmudar has recorded numerous albums, including Saat Suro na Sarname, Paalav, Swarabhishek, Videshini, Niralo Mukaam, Aishwarya's Nursery Rhymes, Sapna Sathe Aishwarya, and Allak Mallak. She recorded her first playback song for the Gujarati film, Ghar maru mandir in February 2003. In 2008, she recorded a theme song, "Asmani Rang Hoon" for the Hindi television series Dill Mill Gayye. Her first Bollywood playback song, "Hari Puttar Is a Dude", was released in July 2011 for the film Hari Puttar: A Comedy of Terrors. She has recorded songs for four Hindi movies and completed recording "Ele Elege" for the 2012 Kannada movie Crazy Loka. She recorded one song, "Aa Safar" for the urban Gujarati movie, Kevi Rite Jaish, in 2012. She has won the Gujarat State Award for Best Playback Singer three times.

== Discography ==
Year	Songs	Movie	Music director	Co-singer(s)	Language
2008	Hari Puttar Is A Dude	Hari Puttar: A Comedy of Terrors	Aadesh Shrivastava, Guru Sharma	Sameer	Hindi
2012	Ele Elege	Crazy Loka	Manikanth Kadri	Solo	Kannada
2012	Don't Worry	Crazy Loka	Manikanth Kadri	Manikanth Kadri, Hemath	Kannada
2012	Ele Elege	Crazy Loka	Manikanth Kadri	Rajesh Krishnan	Kannada
2012	Oosaravalli	Shiva	Gurukiran	Vijay Prakash	Kannada
2012	Aa Safar	Kevi Rite Jaish	Mehul Surti	Parthiv Gohil	Gujarati
2012	Bheeni Bheeni	Kevi Rite Jaish	Mehul Surti	Solo	Gujarati
2014	Main Mushtanda	Kaanchi: The Unbreakable	Subhash Ghai	Mika Singh	Hindi
2014	Kambal Ke Neeche	Kaanchi: The Unbreakable	Ismail Darbar	Neeti Mohan, Aman Trikha, Sanchita Bhattacharya	Hindi
2014	Arziyaan	Jigariyaa	Agnel- Faizan, Raj-Prakash	Vikrant Bhartiya	Hindi
2014	Phurr Phurr	Jigariyaa	Agnel- Faizan, Raj-Prakash	Manjira Ganguly, Agnel Roman	Hindi
2015	Lagi Re Lagan	Bas Ek Chance	Pranav-Nikhil-Shailesh	Javed Ali	Gujarati
2015	I'm In Love	Subramanyam for Sale	Mickey J Meyer	Aditya	Telugu
2015	Tere Bin Nahi Laage (Female Version)	Ek Paheli Leela	Uzair Jaswal (Recreated by Amaal Mallik)	Tulsi Kumar, Alam Khan	Hindi
2015	Aaj Unse Kehna Hai	Prem Ratan Dhan Payo	Himesh Reshammiya	Palak Muchhal, Shaan	Hindi
2016	Ishq Rang	Romance Complicated	Jatin-Pratik	Sonu Nigam	Gujarati
2016	Thumko Dilli No	Romance Complicated	Jatin-Pratik	Javed Ali	Gujarati
2016	Manngamtu	Daav Thai Gayo Yaar	Parth Bharat Thakkar	Armaan Malik	Gujarati
2016	Khwahish	Fodi Laishu Yaar	Manish Bhanushali	Parthiv Gohil	Gujarati
	Tare Aaje Marvanu Chhe	Je Pan Kahish E Sachuj Kahish	Mehul Surti	Solo	Gujarati
2017	Ishq No Rang	Armaan: Story of a Storyteller	Samir - Mana	Parth Oza	Gujarati
2017	Vhalam Aavo ne (Female)	Love Ni Bhavai	Sachin–Jigar	Solo	Gujarati
2018	Odhni	GujjuBhai - Most Wanted	DAWgeek, Advait Nemlekar	Vikas Ambore	Gujarati
	Saathi	Satti Par Satto	Ambika-Prateek	Solo	Gujarati
	Pratham Shri Ganesh	Sharto Lagu	Parth Bharat Thakkar	Siddharth Amit Bhavsar	Gujarati
2019	Asvaar	Hellaro	Mehul Surti	Mooralala Marwada	Gujarati
2022	Chandaliyo Ugyo Re	Naadi Dosh	Kedar & Bhargav	Solo	Gujarati
2025	Gheli Thai Jaaun	Shastra	Mehul Surti	Solo	Gujarati
2025	Kaan Tari Re	Laalo – Krishna Sada Sahaayate	Smmit Jay	Kirtidan Gadhvi	Gujarati
