= Jimit Trivedi =

Indian actor

- Born: 15 May; Mumbai, Maharashtra, India
- Occupation: Actor
- Years active: 2000–present

Jimit Trivedi is an Indian actor, who has performed in Hindi and Gujarati cinema, television and theatre.

== Career ==
Jimit Trivedi debuted in Bollywood films in 2007 with Bhool Bhulaiya, starring Akshay Kumar. His debut in Gujarati films was in 2015 with a lead role in the commercially successful film Gujjubhai The Great, alongside Siddharth Randeria. He is also the leading character in the movie's sequel, GujjuBhai - Most Wanted. Jimit was also the lead role in the Gujarati film Polam Pol. He played a supporting role in the 2018 Bollywood film 102 Not Out starring Amitabh Bachchan and the late Rishi Kapoor.

Trivedi is also into Hindi television shows. He was a part of various daily soaps. In Ek Doosre Se Karte Hain Pyaar Hum he played a small but significant role.

== Filmography ==
Hindi films
Year	Film	Character	Director	Production House	Language	Notes	Ref.
2007	Bhool Bhulaiya	Chandu / Goti	Priyadarshan	Venus Productions, Ratan Jain	Hindi	Shared the screen with Akshay Kumar Paresh Rawal Vidya Balan	
2018	102 Not Out	Dhiru	Umesh Shukla	Sony Pictures, Benchmark Films, Treetop Films	Hindi	Shared the screen with bollywood mega star Amitabh Bachchan and Rishi Kapoor	
2018	Mard Ko Dard Nahi Hota	Jatin Sampat / Jatin Stark	Vasan Bala	RSVP Movies	Hindi		

Gujarati films
Year	Film	Character	Director	Production House	Language	Ref.
2015	Gujjubhai The Great	Bakul Buch (Lead Role)	Ishaan Randeria		Gujarati	
2016	Polam Pol	Duggi	Tejas Padiaa	Lemongrass Productions	Gujarati	
2018	GujjuBhai - Most Wanted	Khagesh Divetia aka KD (Lead Role)	Ishaan Randeria	Pen India Limited, Jayantilal Gada	Gujarati	
2019	Cheel Zadap	Rasik Ranjan (Lead Role)	Dharmesh Mehta	Vision Movie Maker	Gujarati	
2022	Jaysuk Zdpayo	Jaysukh	Dharmesh Mehta		Gujarati	

=== Television ===
Year	TV series	Character	Production House	Ref.
2004-2006	Sarabhai vs Sarabhai	Paritosh	Hats Off Productions, Jamnadas Majethia	
2005	Instant Khichdi	Detective	Special Appearance	
2008-2009	Jeevan Saathi — Humsafar Zindagi Ke	Jignesh Kumar	Playtime Creationn	
2010	Hum Dono Hain Alag Alag	Gajendra aka Gajju	Playtime Creationn	
2012	Ek Doosre Se Karte Hain Pyaar Hum	Binoy Majumdar	Hats Off Productions, Jamnadas Majethia	
2013	Chhanchhan	Mayank	Optimystix Entertainment	
2014	Madhubala	Ashok	BAG Films	
2023	Saas, Bahu Aur Flamingo	Proshun Jain	Maddock Films	

=== Theatre/drama ===
Year	Play	Character	Production House	Language
2000	Jalsa Karo Jayantilal (with Shri Dilip Joshi)	Gangu Mama	Sanjay Goradia Production	Gujarati
2002	Khelaiya - A Musical Play with live singing	Haku	Manhar Gadhia Production	Gujarati
2003	Lagan Gadu Chale Aadu	Mayank	Avni Production	Gujarati
2005	Hum Le Gaye Tum Reh Gaye	Bevda	Sanjay Goradia Production	Hindi
2006	Ba E Mari Boundary	Manorath	Sanjay Goradia Production	Gujarati
2008	Saat Tari Akvees Part 1	New Your	Manhar Gadhia Production	Gujarati
2009	6*4=24	Hu Tane Gamu Chu?	Manhar Gadhia Production	Gujarati
2010	Saat Tari Akvees Part 2	Black Gogal	Manhar Gadhia Production	Gujarati
2010	Lage Raho Gujjubhai	Amit & Bapu Ji	Siddharth Randeria Production	Gujarati
2011	Kishan v/s Kanhaiya (with Paresh Rawal)	Kanhaiya (Lord Krishna)	Angikam Production	Hindi
2019	Aane Bhi Do Yaaro	Aaditya	Once More Production	Hindi

=== Ad films ===
Ad Name	Director	Ref.
Bajaj - XCD Bike	Rajesh Krishnan	
Nokia - Dual Sim Mobile		
Flipkart		
Rishtey Cineplex	Suresh Triveni	
Navratna - Hair Oil ad with Shree Amitabh Bachchan	Vibhu Puri	
Hyundai Santro - Completion of 20 Years in India	Gajraj Rao	
Lipton - Green Tea	Cyezal	Jimit Trivedi for Lipton Tea (ad)
India First Insurance	Devik Rathod	
