= Ujjwal Chopra =

Indian actor

- Occupation: Actor
- Years active: 2005–present

Ujjawal Chopra is an Indian actor. He has done supporting character roles in television serials and films. He played the character of Gora Singh in Sanjay Leela Bhansali's Padmaavat, and as Solanki in Special 26.

== Career ==
Chopra is seen acting in television commercials. During his initial modelling days, he appeared in advertisement campaigns for some of the reputed brands. In 2003, he was seen in the movie ‘Waisa Bhi Hota Hai Part 2’ (2003), which was a sequel of the movie of the same name. He is seen in different movies playing variety of roles. His acting work includes movies Hijack (2008), Love Khichdi (2009), Bittoo Boss (2012), Maximum (2012) & Special 26 (2013).

== Filmography ==
=== Films ===
Year	Film	Role	Notes
2005	Sehar	Inspector Sayyed	
2008	Hijack		
2009	Love Khichdi	Vikas Sharma	
2013	Special 26	Solanki	
2013	Bittoo Boss		
2017	Rangoon		
2017	Take Off	Yosuf	Malayalam film
2018	Padmaavat	Gora Singh	
2019	Uri: The Surgical Strike	Shahid Khan	
2022	Gajab Thai Gayo!	Raghuram	Gujarati film
2023	Sam Bahadur	Brij Mohan Kaul	
2024	Ayalaan	Scientist at Aryan Industries	Tamil film
2026	Daayra	Abhinav Rao	Hindi
2026	Last Man in Tower	Mr. Sanjiv Puri	Hindi

=== Television ===
Year	Serial	Role	Channel
2005	Time Bomb 9/11	RAW Agent	Zee TV
2006-2008	Aek Chabhi Hai Padoss Mein	Mushtaq Ali	Star Plus
2010	Ring Wrong Ring	Ajay	Sony SAB
2015	Taarak Mehta Ka Ooltah Chashmah	Ranjeet/Vishwajeet Nayak	Sony SAB
	Crime Patrol	Senior Inspector	Sony Entertainment Television India

=== Web series ===
Year	Title	Role	Platform	Notes
2019	Rangbaaz	Harjiram	ZEE5 Original	Season 2
2024	Heeramandi	Ashfaq Baloach	Netflix	
2024	Manorathangal	Mr. Parekh	ZEE5	Segment:Vilpana
