= Vickida No Varghodo =

2022 Superhit Gujarati film

- Directed by: Rahul Bhole; Vinit Kanojia
- Produced by: Sharad Patel; Shreyanshi Patel; Vikas Agarwal; Pankaj Keshruwala; Ajay Shroff; Ashissh Pattel; Nirav Patel; Pritish Shah (co-producer)
- Starring: Malhar Thakar; Monal Gajjar; Manasi Rachh; Jinal Belani
- Production companies: SP Cinecorp; Janvi Productions; Rishiv Films
- Distributed by: Rupam Entertainment Pvt Ltd; SP Cinecorp Cinematic Ventures
- Release date: 8 July 2022
- Running time: 156 minutes
- Country: India
- Language: Gujarati

Vickida No Varghodo is a 2022 Indian Gujarati comedy film directed by Rahul Bhole and Vinit Kanojia. The film stars Malhar Thakar, Monal Gajjar, Manasi Rachh and Jinal Belani in lead roles. The film is produced by Sharad Patel, Shreyanshi Patel, Vikas Agarwal, Pankaj Keshruwala. The film was released on 8 July 2022. It was highly successful among family audiences and enjoyed a theatrical run exceeding 50 days. This film grossed over 15 crore at the box office, indicating its popularity and commercial success.

== Plot ==
The film centers around the romantic endeavors of Vicky, exploring the beginning, progression, and ultimately tragic endings of his love affairs. The narrative takes a dramatic turn when Vicky is confronted with a sudden reappearance of someone from his past, leading to upheaval in his present relationships. This disruption leaves not only Vicky, but also the women he is involved with and his father, on edge as they face a precarious and uncertain future. The ensuing chaos is marked by a series of comical missteps and mishaps, which add a lighthearted tone to the otherwise tense and emotionally charged plot.

== Cast ==
- Malhar Thakar as Vicky
- Monal Gajjar as Anushree
- Manasi Rachh as Vidya
- Jhinal Belani as Radhika
- Alapana Buch as Vicky's Mother
- Anurag Prapanna as Vicky's Father
- Bhaumik Ahir as Satish
- Chetan Daiya as Arvind Singh
- Sonali Lele Desai as Saroj
- Chirayu Mistry as Paresh
- Manan Desai as Jamaican Singer

== Soundtrack ==
"Udi Re" was sung by Sonu Nigam.

== Marketing and release ==
The trailer garnered 5 million views within 24 hours of its release. The film was initially projected to be released in mid-2020. The film was released on 8 July 2022.

== Reception ==
Rachana Joshi of Mid-day rated the film as 2.5 out of 5. She praised the performances and songs but criticised the length.
