= Sharato Lagu =

2018 Indian Gujarati film by Neeraj Joshi

- Theatrical Release Poster
- Directed by: Neeraj Joshi
- Produced by: A. Dev Kumar & Yukit Vora
- Starring: Malhar Thakar; Deeksha Joshi; Prashant Barot; Hemant Jha; Alpana Buch; Chhaya Vora; Gopi Desai; Hitarth Joshi; Deepa Trivedi
- Music by: Parth Bharat Thakkar
- Production company: Superhit Entertainment
- Release date: 25 October 2018
- Running time: 137 minutes
- Country: India
- Language: Gujarati
- Box office: ₹ 17.5 crore

Sharato Lagu (transl. Terms and conditions apply) is a 2018 Indian Gujarati-language comedy drama film directed by Neeraj Joshi. It stars Malhar Thakar, Deeksha Joshi, Prashant Barot, Hemant Jha, Chhaya Vora and Alpana Buch. It was released on 25 October 2018. It is produced by A. Dev Kumar and Yukit Vora of Superhit Entertainment and distributed by Rupam Entertainment. The film is a remake of the 2017 Marathi film Chi Va Chi Sau Ka.

== Plot ==
Savi is a vegan who works as a veterinarian at an animal shelter and Satya is an engineer who manufactures products related to solar energy. Both are satisfied in their fields and have won the youth icon award for their work. They are introduced to each other as prospective marriage partners by their parents, having met earlier at the wedding of common friends. During the meeting, Saavi puts forth a condition that she wants to stay with Satya at his house for 2 months in order to test their compatibility and future. Initially everyone except Satya are against this, he thinks it will be a good experiment. When they both explain how arranged marriage couples usually don't get along well and it may end up in divorce, eventually everyone agrees. Saavi has 2 conditions: First, that their relationship will be completely platonic and second that Satya will have to give up non-veg food. Satya agrees and hence Saavi shifts to his house. Over the next 2 months Satya and Saavi get to know about each other, their professions and their interests. Saavi helps Satya in acquiring important work related papers while Satya provides funds for Saavi's animal shelter and they fall in love. However, in a family function, Saavi notices non-veg food being cooked inside and gets very angry on Satya. Satya also gets upset that she doesn't want to adjust at all, and tells her that he changed his daily habits only because of Saavi's request. Both get into a heated argument and breakup with each other. Satya realises his mistake upon watching videos about slaughter houses; while Saavi also feels guilty about being so dominant and stubborn. Satya visits Saavi's animal clinic, genuinely apologises and reconciles with Saavi. Their families are also happy and they organize a surprise wedding for them and they finally marry each other.

== Cast ==
- Malhar Thakar as Satyavrat
- Deeksha Joshi as Savitri
- Prashant Barot as Savitri's Father
- Chhaya Vora as Savitri's Mother
- Hemant Jha as Satyavrat's Father
- Alpana Buch as Satyavrat's Mother
- Gopi Desai as Satyavrat's Dadi
- Hitarth Joshi as Savitri's brother(Tiniyo)
- Deepa Trivedi as Savitri's sister (Ragini)

== Production ==
The film is produced by A. Dev Kumar & Yukit Vora from Superhit Entertainment.

== Development ==
The film is produced A. Dev Kumar & Yukit Vora from Superhit Entertainment. Sharato Lagu has conducted a world premier in IGFF The movie's negative rights have been sold to Shemaroo Entertainment and Movie is available to watch on Shemaroo Me

== Soundtrack ==
Sharato Lagu

Soundtrack album by Parth Bharat Thakkar
- Released: 2018
- Recorded: 2018
- Genre: Feature film soundtrack
- Length: 17:13
- Language: Gujarati
- Label: Jazz Music
- Producer: A. Dev Kumar & Yukit Vora
External audio
- Official Audio Jukebox on YouTube

All music is composed by Parth Bharat Thakkar.

Track listing
No.	Title	Singer(s)	Length
1.	"Pankhi Re"	Aditya Gadhvi, Yashita Sharma, Siddharth Amit Bhavsar	3:50
2.	"Mann Melo"	Jasleen Royal, Siddharth Amit Bhavsar	4.07
3.	"Mann Melo Reprise sad"	Jasleen Royal, Siddharth Amit Bhavsar	2.55
4.	"Mann Melo Theme"	Jasleen Royal, Siddharth Amit Bhavsar	2:55
5.	"Pratham Shree Ganesh"	Aishwarya Majumdar, Siddharth Amit Bhavsar	3:26
Total length:			17:13

== Release ==
Sharato Lagu had conducted a world premier in the Vadilal International Gujarati Film Festival 2018. The film was released on 19 October 2018. Film received positive reviews by the critics. Times of India gave 4/5 stars to the film. Positive Word of mouth meant the film saw very good turn out at the theatres across Gujarat. The film successfully completed its one month in the theatres.
