= GujjuBhai: Most Wanted =

2018 Gujarati comedy film by Ishaan Randeria

GujjuBhai - Most Wanted
- Theatrical release poster
- Directed by: Ishaan Randeria
- Written by: Ishaan Randeria
- Produced by: Dhaval Gada; Aksshay Gada
- Starring: Siddharth Randeria; Jimit Trivedi; Tejal Vyas; Purvi Vyas; Ragi Jani; Jayesh More; Vyoma Nandi; Sunil Vishrani
- Cinematography: Shreyaas Krishna
- Edited by: Tushar Parekh
- Music by: Advait Nemlekar; Parth Bharat Thakkar; Sagar Desai
- Production companies: Pen India Limited; Siddharth Randeria Pictures
- Distributed by: PVR Pictures
- Release date: 23 February 2018
- Running time: 157 minutes
- Country: India
- Language: Gujarati
- Box office: est. ₹10 crore

GujjuBhai - Most Wanted is a 2018 Indian Gujarati comedy film directed by Ishaan Randeria. This is the second film in the Gujjubhai film series and sequel to Gujjubhai the Great (2015). It stars Siddharth Randeria and Jimit Trivedi in the lead roles. The film opened on 23 February 2018 to generally positive reviews.

== Plot ==
The film starts with scene of Doha where terrorist named Yunus meets a man who provides him an intel about Lashkar-E-Jihad terrorist working to plan against India.A secret RA&W agent Vikrant Waghmare along with other fellow agent captures him and find out intel where he contacts to agency headquarters and arrived to Ahmedabad. On the other side, Pakistan's Prime minister Ashraf Ali Sultan was to visit India to sign a peace agreement with India. Arvind is an estate man living with his wife, Indu and only son Khagesh calls himself as KD. Arvind, along with all members went to airport to pick up his mother-in-law, Chandrika where encounters Velji Nagda, a builder quarrel is revealed with for a week ago where Arvind and his son Khagesh planning a way to get rich. They plan a fake construction project and invite fake sellers to collect money from an unsuspecting buyer called Nagda. However, Nagda discovers the plan and calls debt collectors to empty Arvind's house as a lien. They find out that their uncle, Bhupat, is dying and want to give his property to them. The property can pay off the debt. However they need to travel to get Buhpat's signature before getting the house.

On the way to his house, they lose their suitcase on the highway. They run over Vikrant who is going to attend a meeting with terrorists Shahrukh and Farooq. The terrorists were going to give the agent a briefcase that could be used to plot against India. Arvind goes with his family to the hotel which the agent had booked, where he meets another secret agent, Priya. When Vikrant wakes up, he decides to involve Arvind and Kagesh in his plan despite their low intelligence. They both agree that they will exchange the terrorists' briefcase with Arvind's suitcase.

The plan goes awry as the Indian military ambush them and suspect them of being terrorists. The duo end up getting chained to the briefcase, which ends up being a bomb, and have to test their ‘loyalty’ to the terrorist before they reveal their plans. They were left alone diving into sea where through which they reached Pakistan and they get trapped in a terrorist camp. The leader of the organization is revealed to be the Pakistan Defense minister, Parvez Mukhtar. They then find out that Vikrant was actually a terrorist all along. They are left to die, but somehow manage to flee from there. In a function, Arvind and Khagesh finds out that the terrorists have planted a bomb to kill the Pakistan PM, instead of the Indian PM like Arvind had originally thought. They decided to reach the place for an agreement and enters into action to reach the main hall where they revealed the identity of Vikrant and Parvez in front of both PMs and trying to save Pakistan PM. Khagesh and Arvind manage to get rid of the bomb and save the lives of both prime ministers. For this bravery act, Khagesh and Arvind both get medals of honor from the Indian Prime Minister.

== Cast ==
- Siddharth Randeria as Arvind Divetia
- Jimit Trivedi as Khagesh Divetia (KD)
- Jayesh More as Agent Vikrant Waghmare
- Tejal Vyas as Indu (Wife of Arvind)
- Purvi Vyas as Chandrika (Mother-in-law of Arvind)
- Vyoma Nandi as Priya Rajguru
- Sunil Vishrani as Nagda
- RagiJani as police inspector Zoravarsinh Jadeja
- Anil Mange as Terrorist Faruqq
- Alok Gagdekar
- Shafique Ansari
- Firoz Irani (Special Guest Appearance)

== Production ==
Pen India Pvt Ltd entered the Gujarati cinema by producing the film.

Ishaan Randeria, son of Siddarth Randeria, wrote the story, screenplay and directed the film. The film also stars Siddarth Randeria and Jimit Trivedi as the father and son. The film was shot in Ahmedabad in February 2017. Some parts of the film were shot in Bhujia Fort in Bhuj, Kutch.

== Soundtrack ==
Advait Nemlekar, Parth Bharat Thakkar, Sagar Desai directed the music and the lyrics are written by Niren Bhatt. The first song of the film, "Sar Sar Ke" by Aditya Gadhvi and Riya Shah was released on YouTube on 2 January 2016.

Track list
No.	Title	Singer(s)	Length
1.	"Sar Sar Ke"	Aditya Gadhvi, Riya Shah	2:59
2.	"Le Le Meri Jaan"	Rituraj Mohanty	2:36
3.	"Odhni odu"	Aishwarya Majmudar, Vikas Ambore	3:41

== Release ==
The film was initially slated for release on 19 January 2018 but was delayed to 23 February 2018 to avoid clashes with Padmaavat and Pad Man.

== Reception ==
The film was opened to positive reviews. Cinemawalla of Desh Gujarat praised the performances and production but criticised the story and length. Shruti Jambekar of The Times of India rated it four out of five and praised the comedy and dialogues. Shubham Dwivedi of NewsFolo criticised the film for its story and gags.

In first two weeks, the film collected ₹ 10 crore on the box office.
