= Love Ni Bhavai =

- Theatrical release poster
- Directed by: Saandeep Patel
- Written by: Mitai Shukla; Nehal Bakshi
- Produced by: Aarti Patel
- Starring: Malhar Thakar; Pratik Gandhi; Aarohi Patel
- Cinematography: Tapan Vyas
- Edited by: Prateek Gupta
- Music by: Sachin–Jigar
- Release date: 17 November 2017
- Running time: 146 minutes
- Country: India
- Language: Gujarati
- Box office: ₹8 crore (US$830,000) (India)

Love Ni Bhavai is a 2017 Gujarati romantic drama film directed by Sandeep Patel and produced by Aarti Patel. The background score and soundtrack were composed by Sachin–Jigar, with lyrics from Niren Bhatt.

== Plot ==
RJ Antara (Patel) is an FM radio disc jockey in Ahmedabad. She is against love and relationships initially and tells her boss K, Krishna, that she would never fall in love. She wins an award for the youngest RJ achiever when she meets Aaditya (Gandhi), a rich businessman. Aaditya had earlier been stuck in heavy traffic and observed Antara helping in clearing the traffic. Gradually, they became best friends and Aditya genuinely wanted to see her happy. Their friendship was rumored in a news magazine as a love story. Antara gets a call from Swati, who asked her what to answer as her boyfriend Sagar (Thakar), who was going to propose to her on Valentine's Day. Antara asked Swati to listen to her heart and break up with Sagar if she is not happy and doesn't see any future with him. Convinced, Swati rejected Sagar's proposal and breaks up with him.

Sagar learns that the breakup was because of Antara's advice and he decides to take revenge on her. Sagar, and his photographer friend, hope to publish a picture of Antara and Sagar together to ruin Antara's reputation. The two of them blackmail Antara's producer and learn that she is taking a trip to Diu, India. Sagar joins her on the bus, befriends her but falls in love with her as he starts spending time with her on the trip. Sagar then asks his friend to avoid posting the photos until he tells him to do so. Antara also falls for Sagar.

Sagar invites Antara to a birthday party at his home, where she goes to Sagar's room and finds the pictures of her trip with Sagar on his laptop and realizes that he was using her for some motive. She becomes angry, thinking that Sagar was just using her to become famous. When she leaves, Sagar tries to stop her and reveals that his anger is from his rejection by Swati. Antara tells Sagar not to talk with her henceforth.

Aaditya, learning about Sagar and Antara's Diu trip, calls Sagar to his office to warn him to stay away from Antara. Aaditya proposes marriage to Antara but she doesn't immediately respond. Sagar calls her on her radio line to say that, without her, his life has become monotonous and he misses her. Antara ignores Sagar's calls and messages and agrees to marry Aditya. Sagar learns of this and goes to Antara's office, but her boss Krishna tells Sagar to stay away from Antara and avoid hurting her more. Because Antara refuses to respond to Sagar's calls and messages, he sends her a letter asking whom she remembers the most when she gets up in the morning, when drinking coffee and when listening to songs online.

Sagar's friend tells him that his boss is planning to post all the trip pictures in the newspaper on her wedding day to defame Antara. This makes Sagar tense, but he somehow manages to delete all the pictures from the boss' laptop with the help of his friend and snatches the pen-drive with the backup, and throws it into the lake. Aaditya happens to read Sagar's letter at Antara's home and realizes that she is not happy with the marriage proposal. Despite his questions, Antara chooses to stay quiet and wants to marry Aaditya. During the marriage ceremony, Aaditya meets Antara and asks her to say the truth about whom she really thinks of in her mind. When she cannot answer, he tells her that his aim was to see her happy, whether with him or with anyone else. They leave the wedding ceremony and return to her radio station where she asks the city to help find Sagar.

Antara gets help from a tea vendor where Sagar is sitting. Antara arrives and proposes to Sagar, saying that she wants to forget her earlier anger and wants to start a new relationship with him, which Sagar happily accepts. Then, Sagar thanks Aaditya for such a huge sacrifice of his life.

== Cast ==
- Pratik Gandhi as Aaditya Shah
- Aarohi Patel as RJ Antara
- Malhar Thakar as Sagar Desai
- Aarti Patel
- Diana Raval
- Roopa Divatia
- Nisarg Trivedi
- Ghanashyam Nayak as Tea Seller

== Soundtrack ==
The soundtrack was composed by the Bollywood composer duo Sachin–Jigar. "Vhalam Aavo Ne" was presented as a lead soundtrack for the album. There are mainly four soundtracks presented with the other three being variations of the main tracks.

#	Title	Singer(s)	Length	Lyrics	Notes
1	Vhalam Aavo Ne	Jigardan Gadhavi	05:19	Niren Bhatt	Original version
2	Vhalam Aavo Ne – Sad(Female)	Aishwarya Majmudar	02:24	Niren Bhatt	Female sad version
3	Vhalam Aavo Ne – Sad(Male)	Jigardan Gadhavi	01:44	Niren Bhatt	Male sad version
4	Dhun Laagi	Siddharth Amit Bhavsar	04:34	Niren Bhatt	Original version
5	Dhun Laagi – Sad	Siddharth Amit Bhavsar	01:47	Niren Bhatt	Male sad version
6	Athdaya Karu Chhu	Punit Gandhi, Smita Nair Jain	03:58	Niren Bhatt	Only duet from album
7	I Love You Re Mari Savaar	Jonita Gandhi	03:09	Niren Bhatt	-

== Reception ==
The film achieved critical and commercial success and ran for more than 100 days in the theatres.
