= List of Gujarati films of 2016 =

This is a list of Gujarati language films that were released in 2016. The Gujarati films collectively grossed ₹22 crore (US$2.6 million) in 2016, according to Ormax Box Office Report.

== Releases ==
=== January – March ===
Opening	Name	Genre	Director	Cast	Source
1 January	Hutututu: Aavi Ramat Ni Rutu	Thriller	Shital Shah	Parth Oza, Raunaq Kamdar, Shital Shah, Shaina Shah	
15 January	Romance Complicated	Romance	Dhwani Gautam	Malhar Pandya, Divya Misra, Dharmesh Vyas, Shekhar Shukla, Darshan Jariwala, Nisha Kalamdani, Umang Acharya, Yulia Yanina, Dhwani Gautam	
5 February	Sambandho Ni Sonography	Drama	Jaykrushna Rathod	Jaykrushna Rathod, Hasmukh Bhavsar	
12 February	Polam Pol	Comedy	Tejas Padia	Jimit Trivedi, Ojas Rawal, Jinal Belani, Prem Gadhavi, Jayesh More, Sunil Vishrani, Sanat Vyas	
19 February	Love U Baka	Comedy	Utpal Modi	Khyati Madhu, Mukesh Rao, Praysi Nayak, Rash Kavithiya, Chetan Dahiya	
26 February	Prem Rang	Romance	Rafique Pathan	Hiten Kumar, Sonam, Chandani Chopra, Bharat Thakkar, Devendra Pandit, Jitu Pandya, Ayush Jadeja, Hari Rathod, Hetal Rathod, Usha Bhatia	
26 February	Always Rahishu Saathe	Romance	Yuvraj Jadeja	Umang Acharya, Rishabh Tillana Desai, Yuvraj Jadeja, Bharvi, Komal Jhala	
1 March	Dil Ma Vasto Desh	Drama	Deepak Antani	Hitu Kanodia, Mona Thiba, Rani Sharma, Jitu Pandya, Hitesh Rawal, Jaimini Trivedi, Hasmukh Bhavsar	
4 March	Fillam	Romance	Vishal Vada Vala	Asrani, Shakti Kapoor, Sanatan Modi, Devendra Gupta, Ravi Sanghani, Bhumika Bhindi, Jaimin Khakhkhar, Niti Singh	
4 March	Mangu Sayba Janamo Janam No Sath	Romance	Vinesh Prabhakar	Rakesh Barot, Harini Ahir, Geet Shah	
11 March	Ek Bija Mate	Drama	Mukesh Hariyani	Abhijeet Sametriya, Hardik Joshi	
18 March	Chor Na Bhai Ghanti Chor	Comedy	Jagdish Soni	Umang Acharya, Karan Rajveer, Uren Almaula, Mahendra Panchal	
25 March	3 Doba – Three Mistakes Of God	Comedy	Nishith Brahmbhatt	Nirav Mashurwala, Chetan Dahiya, Nishith Brahmbhatt	

=== April – June ===
Opening	Name	Genre	Director	Cast	Source
22 April	Su Karisu	Drama	Subhash J. Shah, Haresh S. Pandya	Asrani, Rittesh Mobh, Bhakti Rathod, Kishore Bhanushali	
20 May	16 Fight Against Ragging	Horror	Lagdhirsinh Jadeja	Sanjay Maurya, Chini Raval, Yuvraj Gadhvi, Nikita Soni	
27 May	Jivan Sathi	Romance	Jeet Kanani	Aarthi Soni, Mehul Patel, Sunil Vasava	
3 June	Thai Jashe!	Drama	Nirav Barot	Manoj Joshi, Malhar Thakar, Monal Gajjar	
17 June	De Taali	Comedy	Sunil Suchak	Sanjay Maurya, Kiran Acharya, Vanraj Sisodiya, Bhairavi Vaidya	
24 June	Daav Thai Gayo Yaar	Comedy	Dushyant Patel	Mitra Gadhvi, Mayur Chauhan, Sunil Vishrani	

=== July – September ===
Opening	Name	Genre	Director	Cast	Source
15 July	Romeo & Radhika	Romance	Siddharth Trivedi	Vidhi Parikh, Tushar Sadhu, Hemang Dave, Shyam Nair	
29 July	Chakravyuh	Thriller	Satyen Varma	Disha Patel, Jeet Upendra, Tej Sapru, Yamini Joshi	
12 August	Duniya Jale To Jale	Drama	Bipin Bapodra	Vikram Thakor	
19 August	Chhokari Vinanu Gaam	Comedy	Rajesh Bhatt	Raaj Kumaar, Devami Pandya, Hitarth Dave, Sahil Shaikh	
25 August	Alya Have Shu?	Comedy	Aziz Sumariya, Divyesh Kathiriya	Nishant Pandya, Rajkumar Soni, Rubina Belim, Sunil Pal	
26 August	Navri Bazar	Comedy	Jitendra Thakkar, Rajesh Bhatt	Disha Patel, Jash Thakkar, Hemin Trivedi, Chetan Daiya	
2 September	Aapne toh chhie Bindaas	Drama	Nishant Dave	Vikee Shah, Pravin Gundecha, Kailash Shadadpuri, Priyanka Tiwari	
2 September	Half Ticket	Romance	Ashish Bhatt	Nayan Shukla, Toral Trivedi, Sanat Vyas, Sharad Sharma	
2 September	Maa Ne Vahlo Dikaro Dikrane Vahali Maa	Drama	Batuk Thakor	Batuk Thakor, Gemini Trivedi, Gopal Raval, Hitu Kanodia	
9 September	Tuu To Gayo	Comedy	Dhwani Gautam	Dharmesh Vyas, Tushar Sadhu, Raunaq Kamdar, Nilay Patel, Twinkle Vasisht	
9 September	Wrong Side Raju	Thriller	Mikhil Musale	Pratik Gandhi, Kimberley Louisa McBeath, Asif Basra, Kavi Shastri, Hetal Puniwala	
16 September	College Bus	Comedy	Hitu Patel	Haard Parikh, Jayesh Lalwani, Naitik Desai, Rajan Thakar	
16 September	Be Shak	Drama	Anil Vanjani	Amil B. Bukhari, Anil Vanjani, Heli Bhatt, Hetansh Shah	
16 September	Ekko Badshah Rani	Comedy	Keshav Rathod	K. Chandan, Pranjal Bhatt, Kiran Acharya, Pal Rawal	
23 September	Var To NRI J	Comedy	Dinesh Barot	Niharica Raizada, Vijay Bhatia, Shekhar Shukla, Rajul Diwan	

=== October – December ===
Opening	Name	Genre	Director	Cast	Source
14 October	Je Pan Kahish E Sachuj Kahish	Thriller	Naitik Raval	Gaurav Paswala, Sneha Devganiya	
14 October	Koi Aane Parnavo	Comedy	Haribhai Maniya	Kalpesh Rajgor, Jitu Pandya, Abhay Chandrana	
28 October	Patel Ni Patlai Ane Thakor Nee Khandani	Drama	Rafik Pathan	Vikram Thakor, Hitu Kanodia, Mamta Soni, Kamini Panchal	
28 October	Shootout	Drama	Shain Leuva	Deep Dholakia, Pranjal Bhatt, Prapti Ajwalia, Rakesh Pujara	
4 November	Commitment	Drama	Atul Patel	Maulika Patel, Manash Shah, Vivek Shah, Kartik Rashtrapal	
4 November	Lavari	Comedy	Rahu Thummar	Aishwaria Dusane, Harshida Pankhanya, Dhriti Patel, Rohan Patel, Mandeep Singh Basran, Sanjjeet Dhuri	
4 November	Passport	Comedy	Rajesh Sharma	Malhar Thakar, Anna Ador, Ujjval Dave, Ashish Vashi, Jayesh More	
11 November	Hardik AbhiNandan	Comedy	Dev Keshwala	Ragini Shah, Devarshi Shah, Gopal Parmar, Navjot Singh Chauhan, Vimmy Bhatt	
11 November	Kaink Karne Yaar	Comedy	Kabir Jani	Tiku Talsania, Aruna Irani, Yatin Parmar, Raj Jatania	
9 December	Mission Mummy	Drama	Ashish Kakkad	Aarti Patel, Raj Vazir	
30 December	Kookh	Drama	Nimesh Desai	Yogita Patel, Naresh Patel, Annapurna Shukla, Rutu Vani	
30 December	Patel Paachho Na Pade Thakor Koi Thi Na Dare	Drama	Harry Baraiya	Jagdish Thakor, Umesh Barot	

== See also ==
- List of Gujarati films
- List of highest-grossing Gujarati films
