= List of Gujarati films of 2021 =

List of Gujarati language films released in 2021

This is a list of Gujarati language films that were released in 2021. The film industry continued to be affected by COVID-19 pandemic. The theaters were kept closed in March–April 2021 due to the resurgence of the pandemic. The Gujarati films collectively grossed ₹15 crore (US$1.6 million) in 2020–21, according to Ormax Box Office Report.

== January–March ==
Opening	Name	Genre	Director	Cast	Ref.
15 January	Tari Yaad Ma Jindagi Javani	Romance	Jitu Pandya	Vikram Thakor, Rina Soni, Arzu Limbachiya, Guru Patel	
12 February	Tikkhi Mitthi Life	Drama	Vaibhav Kerlekar	Bhaumik Sampat, Jinal Belani, Muni Jha	
19 February	Baki Mathi Badbaki	Comedy	Shailesh Patel, Atul Soni	Hemang Shah, Kanwal Taff, Bhavesh Visawadia, Amit Bhanushali	
21 February	Justice	Drama	Kapil Nathvani	Griva Kansara, Gokul Bariya, Jitendra Thakkar	
11 March	Romiyo Whisky	Romance	Rajesh Meghji Maru	Riya Gor, Sanjay Morya, K. K. Goswami	

== April – June ==
Opening	Name	Genre	Director	Cast	Ref.
14 April	Prem Anubandh	Romance	Urvish Parikh	Kalpesh Rajgor, Krutika Desai, Jayendra Mehta, Morli Patel	
20 May	Swagatam	Romance	Neeraj Joshi	Malhar Thakar, Katha Patel, Ojas Rawal, Vandana Pathak	
10 June	Chhello Show	Coming-of-age drama	Pan Nalin	Bhavin Rabari, Bhavesh Shrimali, Richa Meena, Dipen Raval, Paresh Mehta	
19 June	Mara Pappa Superhero	Drama	Darshan Ashwin Trivedi	Abhinay Banker, Shraddha Dangar, Revanta Sarabhai, Bhushan Bhatt	

== July – September ==
Opening	Name	Genre	Director	Cast	Ref.
17 September	Dhuandhaar	Thriller	Rehan Chaudhary	Malhar Thakar, Netri Trivedi, Alisha Prajapati, Dimple Biscuitwala, Hiten Kumar	
24 September	Beti	Drama	Himmat Jikadare	Nidhi Seth, Mehul Solanki, Vimmy Bhatt, Dharmesh Vyas, Sonali Lele Desai	
24 September	All Are Welcome	Drama	Vijay Limbachiya	Hirvit Kubavat, Ashka Singha, Kushal Patel, Rutu Vyas, Shhail Vithlani, Devanshi Shah, Tejas Rupareliya, Harmony Dholkiya	

== October – December ==
Opening	Name	Genre	Director	Cast	Ref.
1 October	Jessu Jordaar	Romantic comedy	Rajan Verma	Kuldeep Gor, Bhakti Kubavat, Dhyey Mehta, Rishikesh Ingley, Manoj Joshi, Supriya Kumari	
15 October	Tari Sathe	Romantic comedy	Rakesh Shah	Bhavya Gandhi, Jinal Belani	
22 October	Jivan Aakhyaan	Drama	Vipul Jambucha	Jeet Malaviya, Manasvi Patel, Dharam Salvani, Vipul Jambucha, Trupti Jambucha, Heena Belani	
11 November	Shrimad Rajchandra	Animation, biographical	Bhairav Kothari	Voice: Amar Babaria, Shubhav Kher	
23 November	Dhummas	Mystery thriller	Kartavya Shah	Jayesh More, Kinjal Rajpriya, Ojas Rawal, Chetan Daiya, Aakash Zala, Bhargav Trivedi, Kinal Trivedi, Malhar Thakar	
3 December	Dhan Dhatudi Patudi	Comedy	Sunny Kumar	Sanjaysinh Chauhan, Jahnvi Chauhan, Jitendra Thakkar, Chetan Daiya, Hemang Dave, Akash Zala, Jitu Pandya, Amit Galani	
3 December	Dramebaaj	Romantic comedy	Gunveen Kaur, Robin Sikarwar	Adesh Singh Tomar, Rima Ramanuj, Gopal Hari, Chetan Daiya, Rahul Raval, Sinhali Vala, Kalpana Gagdekar	
10 December	Divaswapna	Drama	Satish Davara	Pravin Gundecha, Garima Bhardwaj, Chetan Daiya, Bimal Trivedi	
10 December	21mu Tiffin	Drama	Vijaygiri Bava	Niilam Paanchal, Raunaq Kamdar, Netri Trivedi	
17 December	Baap No Bagicho	Comedy	Bhagwan Vaghela, Dashrath Khanpur	Ravi Kishan, Sanjay Goradia, Mustak Khan, Asrani, Yuvraj Suvada, Rina Soni, Zinnat Khan	
17 December	Halkie Fulkee	Drama	Jayant Gilatar	Neha Mehta, Aanandee Tripathi, Jayant Gilatar, Jayaka Yagnik, Shatrughansinh Solanki	
24 December	Lock Down Ma Lafru	Drama	Jayesh Barot	Kamlesh Barot, Avantika Bhatti, Bharat Baria, Hemali Gohil, Tannu Rathod	

== See also ==
- Gujarati cinema
- List of Gujarati films
- List of Gujarati films of 2022
- List of highest-grossing Gujarati films
