= List of Gujarati films of 2014 =

List of Gujarati language films released in 2023

This is a list of Gujarati language films that were released in 2014. The Gujarati films collectively earned total est. ₹7 crore (US$730,000) in 2014.

== Box-office collection ==
Rank	Film	Director	Studio(s)	Gross	Source
1	Bey Yaar	Abhishek Jain	CineMan Productions	est. ₹8.5 crore (US$880,000)	

== January–March ==
Opening	Name	Genre	Director	Cast	Ref.
24 January	Ek Premno Divano Ek Prem Ni Divani	Drama	Harsukh Patel	Vikram Thakor, Rashmi Gupta	
7 February	Deshbook	Comedy drama	Vipul Sharma	Tushar Sadhu, Prasashya Choudhury	
7 March	Nahi Re Chute Taro Saath	Action	Ashok Ghosh	Hiten Kumar, Hitu Kanodia, Nishan Pandiya	
7 March	Rajvadi Bapu Ne Rang Chhe	Action drama	S. K. Rawat	Prithviraj Sinh Chawda, Komal Thakkar, Hitu Kanodia, Mona Thiba	
28 March	Padkar... The Challenge	Action	Sunny Kumar	Shakti Kapoor, Firoz Irani, Hiten Kumar	

== April–June ==
Opening	Name	Genre	Director	Cast	Ref.
4 April	Whisky Is Risky	Drama	Dhaval Patel	Nirmit Vaishnav, Raju Barot, Rakesh Poojara, Shalaka Shiroya, Kshitisha Soni, Tejal Panchasara	
18 April	Namo Saune Gamo	Political	K. Amar Danny	Sarad Sharma, Kirti Maan and Husainy Dawawala, Hemang Tanna, Prashant Saluke, Manish Rohit, Jay Patel, Lalji Bhai Dewariya ,Dilavar Bloch	
25 April	Boss Pappu Pass Thai Gayo	Comedy	Vasant Narkar	Naishal Shah, Rupali Ganguly	
20 June	Rasiya Tari Radha Rokani Rann Ma	Romance	Hussain Bloch	Vikram Thakor, Mamta Soni, Vasim Bloch, Yamini Joshi, Marjina Diwan	

== July–September ==
Opening	Name	Genre	Director	Cast	Ref.
11 July	Sathiyo Chalyo Khodaldham	Drama devotional	Samir Jagot	Apoorva Arora, Leena Jumani, Ujjwal Rana, Sheela Sharma, Mukesh Rawal	
8 August	Odhani	Action	Vasant Narkar	Vikram Thakor, Mamta Soni	
15 August	Vishwasghat	Thriller	Bapodara	Khyati Madhu, Hitu Kanodia	
22 August	Gori Meto Kalje Lakhyu Taru Naam	Drama	Niranjan Sharma	Jawahar Vanjara, Anisha Belim, Nishant Pandya, Niharika Dave	
29 August	Bey Yaar	Coming-of-age comedy drama film	Abhishek Jain	Manoj Joshi, Darshan Jariwala, Divyang Thakkar, Pratik Gandhi, Amit Mistry, Samvedna Suwalka	
29 August	Aapne To Dhirubhai	Comedy	Haritrushi Purohit	Vrajesh Heerji, Jayaka Yagnik, Bhakti Rathod, Ritesh Mobh	
5 September	Deewana Dushman	Action drama	Pankaj Gandhi	Hitu Kanodia, Hiral Trivedi, Naresh Kanodia, Firoz Irani	
18 September	Tran Doba Tauba Tauba	Comedy	Govind Sakariya	Asrani, Hiten Kumar, Jeet Upendra, Kiran Acharya	
26 September	Ghar Maru Mandir	Drama	Keshav Rathod	Chandan Rathod, Chandan Desani, Sunny Khatri, Nisha Soni, Dimple Upadhyay, Usha Bhatiya	

== October–December ==
Opening	Name	Genre	Director	Cast	Ref.
17 October	Kon Halave Limdi Ne Kon Zulave Pipli	Romance action	Harsukh Patel	Vikram Thakor, Mamta Soni, Hiten Kumar, Firoz Irani, Jaimin Trivedi, Radhika, Hitesh Raval, Jitu Pandya.	
28 November	Vaav	Drama	Ashok Patel	Aanandee Tripathi, Komal Thacker, Jagdish Thakor	
12 December	Bajrang Lila	Devotional romance	Shreedutt Vyas	Komal Thacker, Mangal Gadhvi	
19 December	Kalyug No Kano	Action	Axant Patel	Axant Patel	

== See also ==
- List of Gujarati films
- List of highest-grossing Gujarati films
