= Jashwant Gangani =

Indian film director and producer

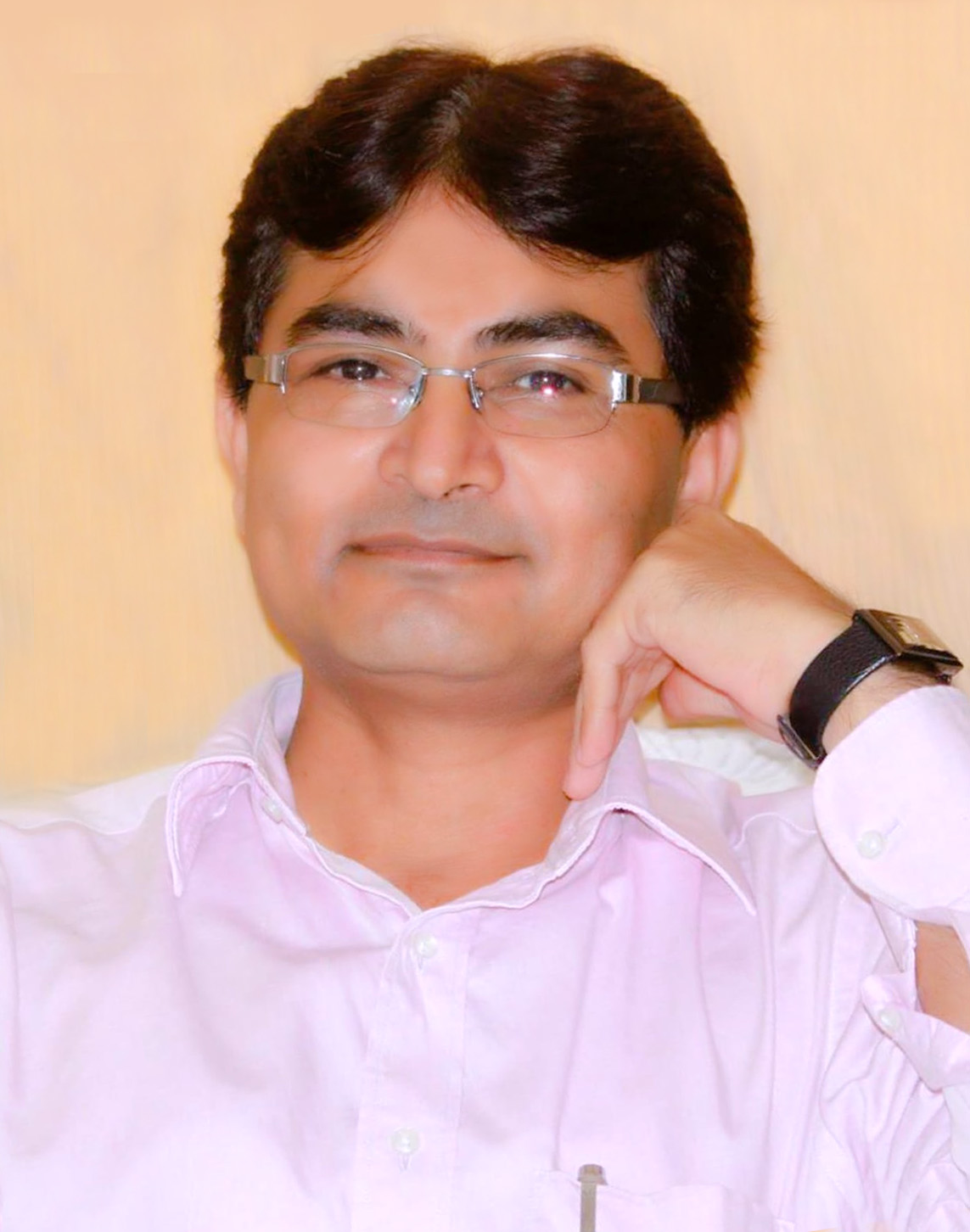
- Gangani in 2019
- Born: Jashwant Shamjibhai Gangani
- Occupations: Lyricist; Writer; Director; Producer
- Years active: 1989–present
- Known for: Maiyar Ma Mandu Nathi Lagtu, Man Sayba Ni Mediye
- Relatives: Raj Gangani (Brother)

Jashwant Gangani is an Indian film writer director and producer.

== Career ==
In 1989, he started directing and producing Gujarati films under his production house. Gangani Film Production Pvt. Ltd. His first Gujarati film as a writer, lyricist, producer, and director, Man Sayba Ni Mediye (1999) was commercially successful. He produced several commercially successful films targeted at rural audience; Maiyar Ma Mandu Nathi Lagtu (2001), Mandavda Ropavo Mana Raj (2003), Mein to Palavade Bandhi Preet (2005), Maiyar Ma Mandu Nathi Lagtu Part II (2008), Mara Rudiye Rangana Tame Saajana (2010). He directed and produced Hindi film Bezubaan Ishq (2015). He also wrote, directed and produced Gujarati TV series, Kariyaawar, telecast on Zee Gujarati from 2006 to 2007 which completed 270 episodes.

== Filmography ==
Year	Title	Language	Director	Producer	Story	Screenplay	Dialogue	Lyrics	Cast	Ref.
1990	Veer Bawavalo	Gujarati			Yes	Yes	Yes	Yes	Naresh Kanodia, shyam kumar	
1991	Prem Na Bandhan	Gujarati			Yes			Yes	Ranjit Raj, Sripradha	
1992	Bhadar Ne Kanthe	Gujarati			Yes			Yes	Upendra Trivedi, Ranjit Raj	
1994	Aapna Malak Na Mayalu Manvi	Gujarati						Yes	Sharmilee Raj, Arvind Rathod	
1997	Kanto Vagyo Kalje	Gujarati				Yes	Yes	Yes	Naresh Kanodia, Roma Manek	
1997	Preet Pangare Chori Chori	Gujarati						Yes	Naresh Kanodia, Minakshi	
1997	Parbhav Ni Preet	Gujarati			Yes	Yes	Yes	Yes	Naresh Kanodia, Shyamla	
1997	Mahendi Lili Ne Rang Rato	Gujarati			Yes			Yes	Ranjit Raj, Sneha	
1999	Man Sayba Ni Mediye	Gujarati	Yes	Yes	Yes	Yes	Yes	Yes	Naresh Kanodia, Roma Manek	
1999	Maa Te Maa Bija Wagdana Vaa	Gujarati						Yes	Arvind Trivedi, Snehlata	
2000	Saacho Sathvaro Saajano	Gujarati					Yes	Yes	Ayub Khan, Jayendra Mehta, Sudha Pathak	
2000	Sajan Haiye Sambhare	Gujarati						Yes	Naresh Kanodia, Deepsikha	
2000	Mena Popat	Gujarati						Yes	Maniraaj Barot Devendra Pandit, Shubhalaxmi	
2000	Dalda Lidha Chori Raj	Gujarati						Yes	Naresh Kanodia, Roma Manek	
2000	Ooncha Khordani Khandani	Gujarati						Yes	Naresh Kanodia, Kiran Kumar, Upendra Trivedi	
2000	Palav Bhini Preet	Gujarati						Yes	Sandeep Kumar, Minakshi Maru	
2001	Maiyar Ma Mandu Nathi Lagtu	Gujarati	Yes	Yes	Yes	Yes	Yes	Yes	Hiten Kumar, Aanandee Tripathi, Arvind Trivedi	
2002	Daladu Lagyu Sayba Na Desh Ma	Gujarati			Yes	Yes	Yes	Yes	Naresh Kanodia, Roma Manek	
2003	Mandavda Ropavo Mana Raj	Gujarati	Yes	Yes	Yes	Yes	Yes	Yes	Hiten Kumar, Aanandee Tripathi, Arvind Trivedi	
2004	Mane Lai De Ne Navrang Chundadi	Gujarati			Yes	Yes	Yes	Yes	Firoj Irani, Hiten Kumar, Aanandee Tripathi	
2005	Shubhodristi	Bengali			Yes	Yes			Jeet, Koyel Mallick	
2005	Mein to Palavade Bandhi Preet	Gujarati	Yes	Yes	Yes	Yes	Yes	Yes	Hiten Kumar, Raj Laxmi	
2006	Shaashu Ghara Chaalijibi	Odia			Yes				Suresh Bal, Akshaya Bastia, Debu Bose	
2008	Maiyar Ma Mandu Nathi Lagtu 2	Gujarati	Yes	Yes	Yes	Yes	Yes	Yes	Hiten Kumar, Aanandee Tripathi	
2010	Mara Rudiye Rangana Tame Saajana	Gujarati	Yes	Yes	Yes	Yes	Yes	Yes	Hitu Kanodia, Naresh Kanodia	
2012	Vidhata	Gujarati					Yes	Yes	Hiten Kumar, Aanandee Tripathi, Nishant Pandya	
2013	Lagyo Kasumbi No Rang	Gujarati						Yes	Panini Rajkumar,Sadashiv Amrapurkar, Shahbaaz Khan, Kiran Kumar, Govind Namdeo	
2015	Bezubaan Ishq	Hindi	Yes	Co Produced with C.J.Gadara, Dinesh Likhiya	Yes	Yes	Yes	Yes	Mugdha Godse, Sneha Ullal, Nishant Malkani, Darshan Jariwala	
2023	My Best Friend Daadu	Gujarati	Yes	Yes	Yes	Yes	Yes	Yes	Umang Acharya, Urvashi Harsora, Vishal Thakkar, Prashant Barot	

=== Television ===
Year	Title	Language	Director	Producer	Story	Screenplay	Dialogue	Lyrics	Cast	Ref.
2006	Kariyaawar	Gujarati		Yes	Yes	Yes	Yes	Yes	Hitu Kanodia, Devendra Pandit	

== See also ==
- List of people from Gujarat
- List of Gujarati films
- Gujarati cinema
- Surat List Of Surat People
