= Ek Var Piyu Ne Malva Aavje =

- Theatrical release poster
- Directed by: Harsukh Patel
- Written by: Mukesh Malavankar
- Screenplay by: Mukesh Malavankar
- Story by: Dhiren Randheja
- Produced by: Vikram Thakkar; Ramesh Patel; Ashok Patel; Vishnu Patel; Rakesh Solanki; Gunvant Thakor
- Starring: Hiten Kumar; Vikram Thakor; Firoz Irani; Minaxi; Mamta Soni; Jayendra Mehta; Bhaskar Nayak; Jaimini Trivedi; Mayur Vankani
- Cinematography: Mahesh Sharma
- Music by: Appu
- Production company: Jay Shree Mahaveer
- Release date: 20 October 2006
- Country: India
- Language: Gujarati

Ek Var Piyu Ne Malva Aavje (Gujarati: એકવાર પિયુને મળવા આવજે) is a 2006 Gujarati romantic action film produced by Vikram Thakkar, Ramesh Patel, Ashok Patel, Vishnu Patel, Rakesh Solanki, Gunvant Thakor, directed by Harsukh Patel, starring Hiten Kumar, Vikram Thakor, Firoz Irani, Minaxi, Mamata Soni, Jayendra Maheta, Jaimini Trivedi and Mayur Vankani in the lead roles, released in 2006.

== Plot ==
Vikram (Vikram Thakor), a stage performer, loved Radha (Mamta Soni), a daughter of rich Vajesang Thakor. Vajesang disapproved of their marriage due to the poor financial condition of Vikram. Suraj (Hiten Kumar), Vikram's brother, gives in and helps Vikram to marry Radha.

== Cast ==
- Hiten Kumar as Suraj
- Vikram Thakor as Vikram
- Firoz Irani as Roopsinh
- Minaxi as Tejal
- Mamta Soni as Radha
- Jayendra Mehta as Vajesang Thakor
- Jaimini Trivedi as Kadavi Foi
- Bhaskar Nayak as Mangalsinh
- Mayur Vankani as Popat

== Reception ==
The film was debut of Vikram Thakor which was commercially successful. The film completed 51 weeks.

== Soundtrack ==
Ek Var Piyu Ne Malva Aavje

Soundtrack album by Vikram Thakor and group
- Released: 1 October 2006
- Genre: Film soundtrack
- Length: 54:11
- Label: Jay Shree Mahaveer Audio
- Producer: Vikram Thakkar, Ramesh Patel, Ashok Patel, Vishnu Patel, Rakesh Solanki, Gunvant Thakor

Vikram Thakor and group chronology
Bewafa Sanedo (2006)	Ek Var Piyu Ne Malva Aavje (2006)	Paradeshi Aashique (2006)

The music of the film is by Appu and all the songs were composed and written by Gunvant Thakor. The music album was released by Jay Shree Mahaveer Audio.

Track listing
No.	Title	Artist(s)	Length
1.	"Ek Var Piyu Ne Malva Aavje" (Happy version)	Vikram Thakor, Dipali Saumaiya	4:55
2.	"Hu Rangilo Hu Mojilo"	Vikram Thakor, Nayan Rathod	4:56
3.	"Gori Taro Latakore"	Arvind Barot, Dipali Saumaiya	4:58
4.	"Kadaju Kapi Jivado Kadhu"	Vikram Thakor, Dipali Saumaiya	8:06
5.	"Ek Var Piyu Ne Malva Aavje" (Sad version)	Vikram Thakor	5:20
6.	"Prem Gori Taro Kem Kari Bhulay"	Vikram Thakor	3:52
7.	"Khili Khili Chandarmani Raat"	Vikram Thakor, Shilpa Thakor	2:20
8.	"Rajwadi Chhiye Ame Maan Bher Rahiye"	Vikram Thakor	2:43
9.	"Doshino Sanedo"	Vikram Thakor	2:27
10.	"Gori Taro Latakore"	Nayan Rathod, Dipali Saumaiya	5:00
11.	"Sajani Morire…"	Vikram Thakor, Dipali Saumaiya	5:49
12.	"Ek Var Piyu Ne Malva Aavje" (Instrumental)		3:45
