= Jinal Belani =

Indian actress

Jhinal Belani
- Born: 29 April 1992 (age 34); Mumbai, Maharashtra, India
- Occupations: Actress, Model
- Years active: 2012–present
- Height: 5 ft 4 in (1.63 m)

Jinal Belani (also known as Jhinal Belani) is an Indian actress who primarily works in the Gujarati film industry. She is born and brought up in Mumbai, India.

== Early life and education ==
Jhinal did her graduation in Mass media from Mithibai College and then MA Literature through distance learning from Mumbai University. She was involved in theatre during her college days and did a Dove ad in 2012. She then appeared in a series of ads like Doycare, Micromax, Hawkins, Roopsangam Sarees and Sahara Mineral Water to name a few.

== Acting career ==
Jinal Belani made her TV debut as female lead in the Doordarshan show Laaga Chunri Mai Daag based on the Bollywood movie Fashion where she played the role of a small town girl aspiring to make it big in the movie industry. She was also the female lead in the Gujarati movie Polam Pol releasing on 12 February 2016. She will be seen playing south star Dhanush's bride in upcoming Bollywood film Nimmo. Produced by Anand L Rai (color yellow productions), film is directed by his assistant Rahul Shankalya.

She is also shooting for writer - director Vipul K.Rawal's untitled next. She is playing young college girl in this thriller. She also did two more Gujarati films in year 2017. Dhantyaopen and wassup zindagi, for both she received critical acclaim. She did gujarati web series "bas cha sudhi" season 2 & 3.

== Filmography ==
=== Films ===
Year	Title	Role	Language	Note	Ref.
2016	Polam Pol	Anjali	Gujarati	Debut main lead	
2017	Dhantya Open	Wafa	Gujarati		
2017	Wass...up! Zindagi	Nisha	Gujarati		
2017	Patel Ki Punjabi Shaadi	Manisha Patel	Hindi	Bollywood debut heroine friend	
2019	Tony	Kamya	Hindi		
2019	Order Order Out of Order		Gujarati		
2021	Tikkhi Mitthi Life	Pooja Vyas	Gujarati	Producer, writer and actor	
2021	Tari Sathe	Mumbai Girl	Gujarati		
2022	Vickida No Varghodo	Radhika	Gujarati		
2022	Bhagwan Bachave †	TBA	Gujarati	Writer, director and actor	

=== Television ===
Year	Title	Role	Channel	Language	Note	Ref.
2014	Chupaun Kaise Laga Chunri Mein Daag		DD National	Hindi		
2017	Har Mard Ka Dard	Sonu Tanna Khanna	Life OK	Hindi	Lead Role	

=== Web series ===
Year	Title	Writer	Director	Actor	Role	Language	Channel	Note	Ref.
2020	Tu Ane Hun	Yes	Yes	Yes	Jhinal	Gujarati	YouTube		
2021	Poori Paani			Yes	Mansi	Gujarati	ShemarooMe		
