= Komal Thacker =

Indian actress (born 1985)

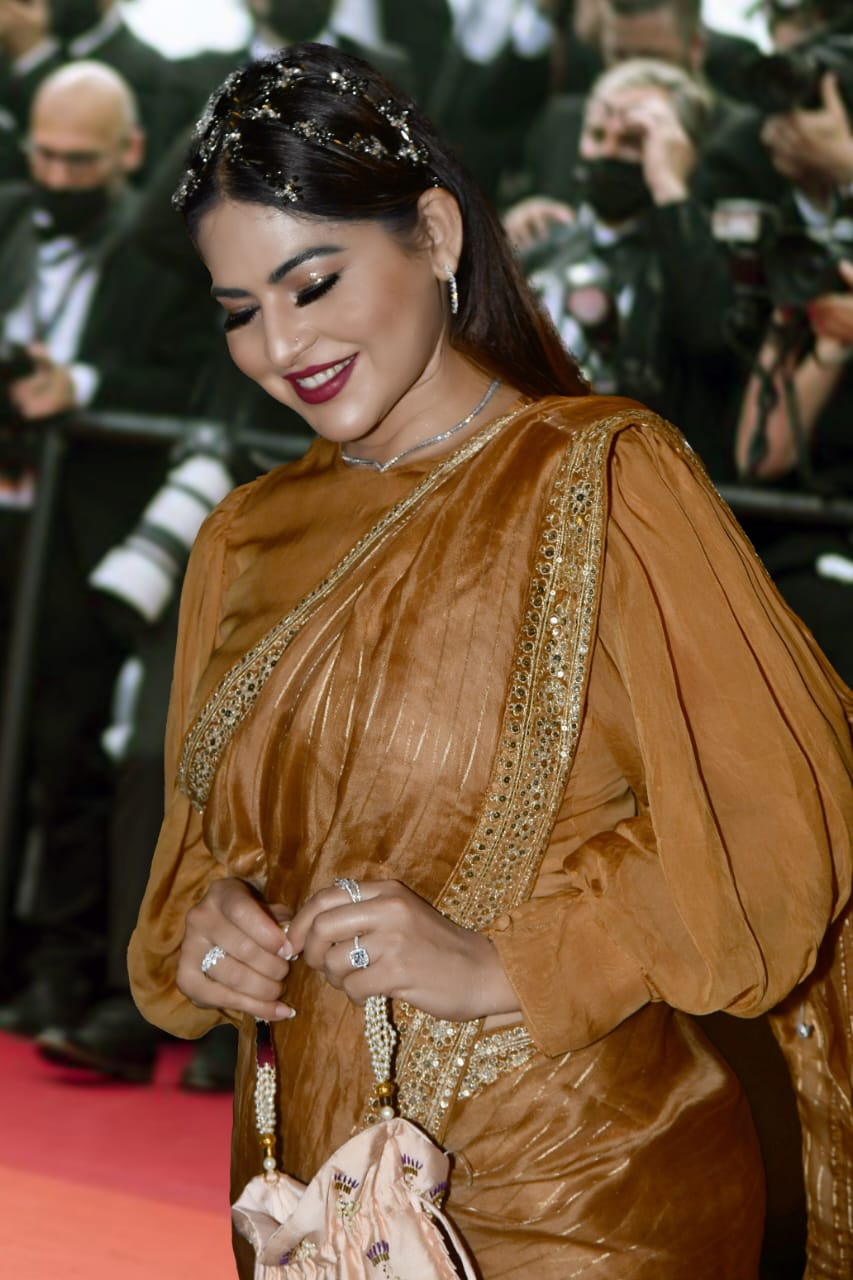
- Komal Thacker at 2022 Cannes Film Festival
- Born: 13 September 1985 (age 40); Gandhidham,Kutch district, Gujarat, India
- Occupation: Actress
- Years active: 2004–present

Komal Thacker (born 13 September 1985) is an Indian actress primarily working in the Gujarati film industry. She made her acting debut in the Gujarati film Alakh Na Ajwala in 2006 opposite Hiten Kumar, which was directed by Chandresh Bhatt and have started her journey as an actress, she is known for the Hameer (film), which released in 2017, Kasoombo, which released in 2024. She was the first Gujarati actress to receive an official invitation to the 2022 Cannes Film Festival and was invited again in 2023 Cannes Film Festival as an official guest. Komal Thacker made a stunning return to the Cannes Film Festival in 2025, making her third appearance.

== Life and career ==
Komal has done her primary schooling from her hometown Gandhidham, Kutch district, she has done her graduation from Gujarat University, after the graduation she moved to Mumbai to pursue her acting career. She debuted in Gujarati cinema in 2006, opposite Hiten Kumar and her acting journey has started. In 2017 her career was started shining, on that time she did back to back projects like Aa to Prem Che. Later on she has been seen in Aatank opposite Jeet Upendra. She featured in Punjabi video songs. She appeared in Rajasthani movie. She appeared in Gujarati movie named Avtar Dhari Ne Aavyo Chu, where she paired with Hiten Kumar and Vikram Thakor. In 2023 She has adopted a dog and named him as Taimur, later on social media users made joked on it. In 2024 she started shooting for Sanghavi and Sons, which is going to release in 2025.

== Filmography ==
Year	Title	Director	Language
2006	Alakh Na Ajwala	Chandresh K Bhatt	Gujarati
2008	Mahisagar Na Saugandh	Mukund Patel	Gujarati
2009	Bhad No Dikaro	Hitu Patel	Gujarati
2010	Parnetar Ni Preetadi	Vithalbhai Patel	Gujarati
2014	Rajvadi Bapu Ne Rang Che	Suryakiran Rawat	Gujarati
2014	Vaav	Ashok Patel	Gujarati
2015	Aa to Prem chhe	Ashok Patel	Gujarati
2015	Avtar Dharine Aavu Chu	Atmaram Thakor	Gujarati
2016	My Father Iqbal	Suzad Iqbal Khan	Hindi
2017	Hameer	Ashok Patel	Gujarati
2017	Bewafa Sanam Tari Bahu Meherbani	Poonam Beldar	Gujarati
2018	O Gori Meto Dil Thi Bandhi Che Preet	Subhash Shah	Gujarati
2021	I Love You Radha	Naresh Kumar	Gujarati
2022	Purna Purushottam Shree Swaminarayan Bhagwan	Rakesh Pujara	Gujarati
2023	Hu chhu Mr. Shankar	Rafik Talukdar	Gujarati
2024	Kasoombo	Vijaygiri Bava	Gujarati
2025	Sanghavi and Sons	Chandresh K Bhatt	Gujarati
