= Raado =

2022 Indian Gujarati film

- Raado Official Poster
- Directed by: Krishnadev Yagnik
- Written by: Krishnadev Yagnik
- Produced by: Munna Shukul; Jayesh Patel
- Starring: Hitu Kanodia; Yash Soni; Tarjanee Bhadla; Nikita sharma Bharat Chawda; Niilam Paanchal; Devarshi Shah; Prachi Thaker; Hiten Kumar
- Cinematography: Pratik Parmar
- Music by: Rahul Munjariya
- Production companies: Shukul Studios; Patel Entertainment; Ananta Businesscorp; Big box series
- Distributed by: Panorama Studios
- Release date: 22 July 2022
- Running time: 142 minutes
- Country: India
- Language: Gujarati

Raado is a 2022 Gujarati political thriller film written and directed by Krishnadev Yagnik. It stars Hitu Kanodia, Yash Soni, Tarjanee Bhadla, Nikita Sharma, Bharat Chawda, Devarshi Shah, Prachi Thaker, Niilam Paanchal, and Hiten Kumar. The film is produced by Jayesh Patel and Munna Shukul, with distribution rights held by Panorama Studios.

== Plot ==
Powerful people with strong political influence, leaders of the crowd, and determined law enforcement collide with one another.

== Cast ==
- Hitu Kanodia
- Yash Soni
- Tarjanee Bhadla
- Nikita Sharma
- Bharat Chawda
- Devarshi Shah
- Prachi Thaker
- Niilam Paanchal
- Gaurang Anand
- Chetan Daiya
- Rajan Thaker
- Pratik Rathod
- Denisha Ghumra
- Jay Vasavada
- Hiten Kumar
- Satyendra parmar

== Development ==
The official teaser of the film launched on 13 June 2022, followed by trailer on 20 June 2022. The music rights were acquired by Panorama Studios, and both the music and background score were composed by Rahul Mujariya.

== Reception ==
Rachana Joshi of the Mid-Day Gujarati rated it 3.5 out of 5 stars and praised the direction, action, performance, cinematography and background score, however criticized the story, screenplay, projection, dialogues, and loud music.
