= Armaan: Story of a Storyteller =

- Directed by: Rehan Chaudhary
- Written by: Rehan Chaudhary
- Produced by: Simon Fernandes
- Starring: Poojan Trivedi; Alisha Parjapati; Netri Trivedi; Prashant Barot
- Edited by: Rashesh Desai
- Music by: Samir.Mana
- Production company: Happy Endings Productions
- Distributed by: Dhudiya Pictures
- Release date: 10 February 2017 (India)
- Running time: 107 minutes
- Country: India
- Language: Gujarati

Armaan: Story of a Storyteller (Short Armaan) is a 2017 Indian Gujarati drama film directed by Rehan Chaudhary. Starring Poojan Trivedi, Alisha Prajapati, Netri Trivedi, Prashant Barot and Twisha Bhatt.

== Cast ==
- Poojan Trivedi as Armaan
- Alisha Prajapati as Alie
- Netri Trivedi as Biyara
- Prashant Barot as Rajubhai
- D.Kay as Dev Kakkad
- Twisha bhatt as Priya
- Raahul vyas as Joy

=== Filming ===
The film is set and shot in Ahmedabad & Vadodara.

== Soundtrack ==
Armaan

Soundtrack album by Samir - Mana
- Released: 21 January 2016
- Genre: Feature film soundtrack
- Length: 16:26
- Label: Krup Music

Samir Mana gave the Music of the film and the lyrics were penned by D - Kay. The Music of the film was released by Krup Music.

Track list
No.	Title	Lyrics	Singer(s)	Length
1.	"Ishq No Rang"	D - Kay	Aishwarya Majmudar, Parth Oza	4:16
2.	"Aa Duniya Ma"	D - Kay	Bhoomi Trivedi	4:25
3.	"Nazariya"	D - Kay	Meet Jain	4:43
4.	"Ishq No Rang Unplugged"	D - Kay	Alisha Prajapati	3:02

== Release ==
The film was released on 10 February 2017 in India.
