= Vicky Ki Taxi =

- Written by: Vipul K Rawal
- Country of origin: India
- Original language: Hindi

Production
- Running time: 44 minutes

Original release
- Network: Real TV
- Release: 6 March – 19 June 2009

Vicky Ki Taxi is a TV show that aired on the Indian channel Real TV and it premiered on 6 March 2009. The story revolves around Vicky and his taxi 'Jaaneman’. The show was written by Vipul K Rawal.

== Cast ==
- Pawan Shankar as Vicky
- Kurush Deboo as Pinto, the garage owner
- Deepak Advani as Vicky's friend
- Mushtaq Khan as Shetty, the hotelier
- Suhasi Goradia Dhami as Vicky's girlfriend
- Vaishnavvi Shukla as grand daughter of Reema Lagoo
- Rashami Desai (horror appearance)
- Koneenica Banerjee (special appearance; final episode)
