= The Great Gujarati Matrimony =

2024 film directed by Preet

- Official Poster
- Directed by: Preet
- Written by: Jhanvi Chopda
- Produced by: Divyesh Doshi; Jagat Gandhi
- Starring: Hiten Kumar; Mitra Gadhavi; Siddhi Idnani; Devarshi Shah; Suchita Trivedi
- Cinematography: Suman Kumar Sahu
- Edited by: Vaishnavi Krishnan
- Music by: Siddharth Amit Bhavsar
- Production companies: Jahn Studios LLP; Storytell Films
- Distributed by: Rupam Entertainment Pvt Ltd
- Release date: 22 November 2024
- Running time: 150.00 minutes
- Country: India
- Language: Gujarati

The Great Gujarati Matrimony is a 2024 Gujarati romantic drama, directed by Preet and written by Jahnvi Chopda. It stars Hiten Kumar, Mitra Gadhavi Siddhi Idnani, Devarshi Shah, Suchita Trivedi and others. The film is produced by Divyesh Doshi, Jagat Gandhi and Co Produced by Manoj Ahir and Krunal Sangani. The film will be distributed by Rupam Entertainment Pvt Ltd.

== Plot ==
The Great Gujarati Matrimony is a romantic drama that follows the intertwined lives of Iti, an aspiring actress, Raaghav, a lively matrimony agency owner, and Ved, an investment banker from UK. As they navigate love, cultural clashes, and self-discovery, their journey explores the complexities of relationships and personal growth.

== Cast ==
- Hiten Kumar as Rustam
- Mitra Gadhavi as Raghav
- Siddhi Idnani as Itishri
- Devarshi Shah as Ved
- Suchita Trivedi as Rachana
- Tatsat Munshi as Veer
- Jahnvi Gurnani as Saanj
- Chhaya Vora
- Bhavini Jani
- Prashant Barot
- Bharat Thakkar
- Falguni Dave
- Satish Bhatt
- Chaula Doshi
- Nilesh Brahmbhatt
- Ranganath Gopalarathnam

== Production ==
The film was shot at various locations in Ahmedabad Gujarat.

== Soundtrack ==
The Great Gujarati Matrimony

Soundtrack album by Siddharth Amit Bhavsar
- Released: 12 November 2024
- Genre: Feature film soundtrack
- Length: 7:41
- Language: Gujarati
- Label: Storytell Films, JAHN Studio LLP

=== Tracklist ===
All lyrics are written by Niren Bhatt, Bhargav Purohit; all music is composed by Siddharth Amit Bhavsar.

Track listing
No.	Title	Lyrics	Music	Singer(s)	Length
1.	"Naach"	Niren Bhatt	Siddharth Amit Bhavsar	Raghav Kaushik, Madhubanti Bagchi	3:26
2.	"Jheeni Re"	Bhargav Purohit	Siddharth Amit Bhavsar	Siddharth Amit Bhavsar	4:15
3.	"Khaali Khaali"	Bhargav Purohit	Siddharth Amit Bhavsar	Madhubanti Bagchi, Siddharth Amit Bhavsar	4:34
4.	"Aa Toh Mann Chhe"	Bhargav Purohit	Siddharth Amit Bhavsar	Siddharth Amit Bhavsar	3:23
Total length:					15:38

== Marketing and releases ==
The announcement of the film made on July 14, 2024. The release date of the film has been announced on September 24, 2024. The teaser of the film released on October 18, 2024, and official trailer of the film released on November 8, 2024. The music of the film is also launched on November 8, 2024. Film is set to hit the cinemas on November 22, 2024.

== See also ==
- List of Gujarati films of 2024
