= Chupaun Kaise Laga Chunri Mein Daag =

Indian Television Series

- Genre: Entertainment
- Written by: Iqbal Munshi
- Directed by: Rupesh D Gohil
- Country of origin: India
- Original languages: Hindi; English
- No. of episodes: 260

Production
- Producer: Rupesh D Gohil
- Camera setup: Multi Camera
- Production company: RDG Productions

Original release
- Network: DD National

Related
- Miss India (TV series)

Chupaun kaise laga chunri mein daag is an Indian television drama series that aired on DD National in 2014.The series, starring Nimai Bali, Sachhin Chhabra, Jinal Belani, Sonia Shah and Homi Wadia, was directed and produced by Rupesh D Gohil. Chupaun kaise laga chunri mein daag is a Love Story of a small town girl from Bhopal who fails in Love with Bollywood Superstar Prem Nanda and her journey to become a Bollywood Actress.

== Cast ==
- Nimai Bali
- Sachin Chhabra
- Jinal Belani
- Sonia Shah
- Homi Wadia
- Muheet Khan
