= Rehan Chaudhary =

Indian filmmaker (born 1994)

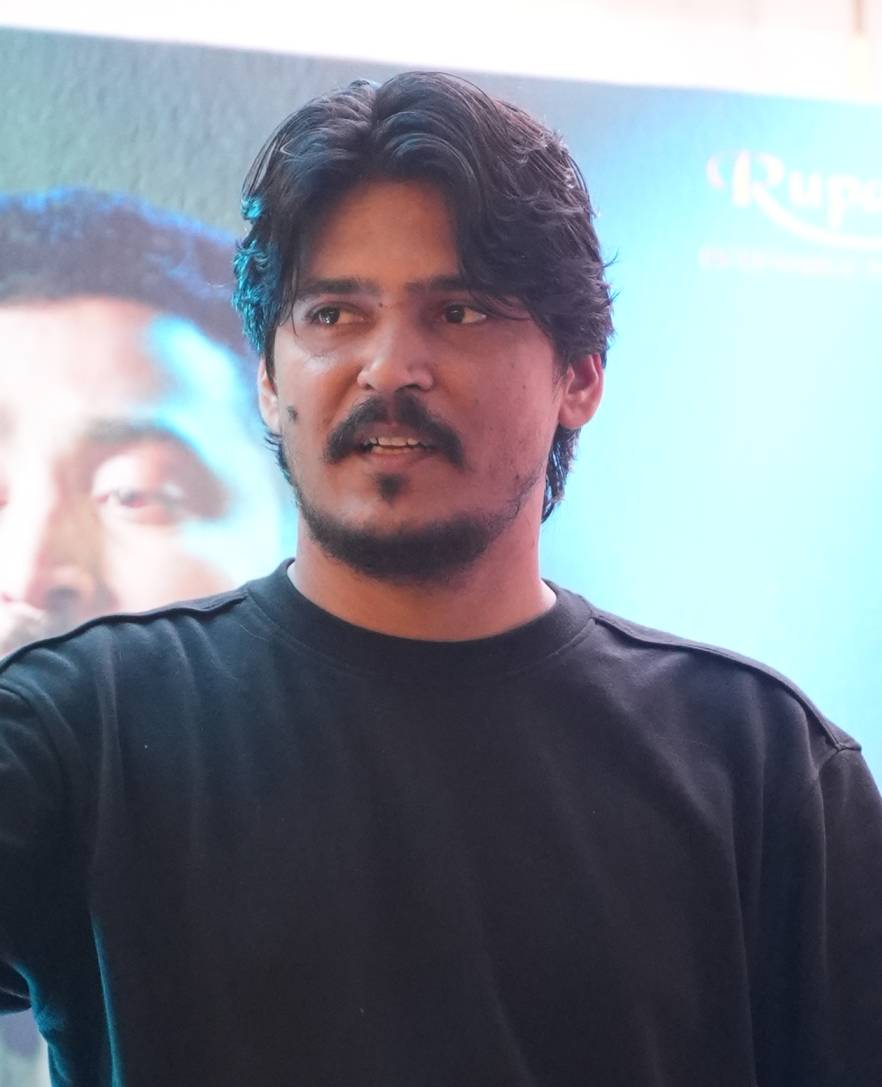
- Rehan Chaudhary at Kabanda Premiere
- Born: July 5, 1994 (age 32); Jodhpur, Rajasthan, India
- Occupations: Film producer; director; screenwriter
- Years active: 2017–present
- Known for: Dhuandhaar (2021); Congratulations (2023); Kabanda (2026)

Rehan Chaudhary (born 5 July 1994) is an Indian film director, producer and screenwriter who works primarily in Gujarati cinema. He is known for directing the films Armaan: Story of a Storyteller (2018), Tu Chhe Ne (2019), Dhuandhaar (2021), Congratulations (2023), and Kabanda (2026).

== Career ==
Chaudhary made his directorial debut with Armaan: Story of a Storyteller, for which he also wrote the screenplay.

In 2018, he produced the Gujarati film Balloooon, directed by Navjot Singh Chauhan.

He later directed Tu Chhe Ne, starring Dimple Biscuitwala and Shyam Nair.

During the COVID-19 pandemic, Chaudhary publicly appealed for adherence to lockdown regulations and social responsibility through media interactions.

In 2019, Chaudhary announced the thriller film Dhuandhaar, starring Malhar Thakar. The film was written and directed by Chaudhary and starred Malhar Thakar, Hiten Kumar, Netri Trivedi and Alisha Prajapati. Production was completed following multiple schedules affected by the COVID-19 pandemic, and filming wrapped in late 2020. The film was produced by Jeegar Chauhan and Rajesh Thakkar.

Following Dhuandhaar, Chaudhary announced a family drama project. The film, titled Congratulations, starred Sharman Joshi and Manasi Parekh. Chaudhary served as director, producer and writer of the film. The film was released in 2023 after approximately three years of development and production.

In 2026, Chaudhary directed, produced and wrote Kabanda, a Gujarati horror-thriller film marketed under the title Kabanda: A Myth Awakens.

After the successful release of Kabanda, He has announced the Kabanda 2, which will come in 2027.

== Filmography ==
| Year | Film | Producer | Director | Writer | Language | Refs |
|---|---|---|---|---|---|---|
| 2027 | Kabanda 2 | Yes | Yes | Yes | Gujarati | |
| 2026 | Kabanda | Yes | Yes | Yes | Gujarati | |
| 2023 | Congratulations | Yes | Yes | Yes | Gujarati | |
| 2021 | Dhuandhaar | | Yes | Yes | Gujarati | |
| 2019 | Tu Chhe Ne | | Yes | Yes | Gujarati | |
| 2018 | Balloooon | Yes | | | Gujarati | |
| 2018 | Armaan: Story of a Storyteller | | Yes | Yes | Gujarati | |
