= Congratulations (2023 film) =

Upcoming film directed by Rehan Chaudhary

- Theatrical release poster
- Directed by: Rehan Chaudhary
- Written by: Rehan Chaudhary
- Produced by: Sharman Joshi; Jeegar Chauhan; Vedant Maheshwari; Rehan Chaudhary
- Starring: Sharman Joshi; Manasi Parekh; Archan Trivedi; Swati Dave; Jayesh Barbhaya; Ami Bhayani
- Cinematography: Bhavik Hiralal Charania
- Music by: Kedar - Bhargav
- Production companies: Sharman Joshi Productions; Rehan Chaudhary Films
- Distributed by: Rupam Entertainment Pvt Ltd
- Release date: 3 February 2023
- Running time: 132 minutes
- Country: India
- Language: Gujarati

Congratulations is a 2023 Indian Gujarati-language drama film directed by Rehan Chaudhary. Starring Sharman Joshi and Manasi Parekh, it is produced by Sharman Joshi, Jeegar Chauhan, Vedant Maheshwari and Rehan Chaudhary, and distributed by Rupam Entertainment Pvt. Ltd.

== Plot ==
Aditya marries his college girlfriend Ragini. Ragini is ready to have children however, Aditya is not. After a miscarriage and delivering a stillborn, Ragini cannot conceive a baby. Aditya will find out how far he will go to revive his love life with Ragini and what he will do to conceive children with her.

== Cast ==
- Sharman Joshi as Aditya
- Manasi Parekh as Ragini
- Jayesh Barbhaya as Dr Kartik
- Ami Bhayani as Dr. Ira
- Archan Trivedi as Kamlesh Mehta
- Swati Dave as Ramila Mehta

== Production ==
The film is produced by Sharman Joshi, Jeegar Chauhan, Vendant Maheshwari and Rehan Chaudhary. Sharman Joshi, Jayesh Barbhaya and Ami Bhayani made their Gujarati Cinema debut with this film.

== Soundtrack ==
Congratulations

Soundtrack album by Kedar - Bhargav
- Released: 14 January 2023
- Genre: Feature film soundtrack
- Language: Gujarati
- Label: Jeegar Chauhan Productions

The soundtrack was composed by Kedar - Bhargav.

All lyrics are written by Bhargav Purohit.

Track listing
No.	Title	Singer(s)	Length
1.	"Bekhabar"	Shaan, Manasi Parekh	3:53
2.	"Saari Saari"	Vrattini Ghadge	2:13
3.	"Jaage Jaage"	Jigardan Gadhavi	3:45
Total length:			9:51

== Marketing and release ==
The first poster was released on 3 January 2023. The trailer was released on 13 January 2023. The film released on 3 February 2023.

== Accolades ==
The film received 2 nominations at the 21st Transmedia Gujarati Awards.

== See also ==
- List of Gujarati films of 2023
