= Arvind Barot =

Indian singer-songwriter

Arvind Barot અરવિંદ બારોટ
- Arvind Barot in Surat

Background information
- Born: Arvind Barot
- Genres: Folk; Rock; Pop; Dance
- Occupations: playback singer; songwriter; music director; performer; actor
- Instruments: Guitar; Harmonium; Piano
- Labels: T-Series; Tips; Shemaroo; Shivam Cassettes

Arvind Barot is an Indian playback singer, songwriter, music director, composer, and poet from Ahmedabad, India. He also specializes in Bhajan, religious and Garba songs and other folk genres. He has sung more than 8,000 Gujarati songs and is best known for his works in the Gujarati cinema for rendering his voice in Gujarati movies of the 1990s and early 2000s.

== Early life and career ==
Arvind is based from the Savarkundla, Amreli, and currently is living in Ahmedabad, Gujarat. he has sung more than 8,000 film-non-film songs in Gujarati from which he has written several songs himself and has composed music for more than 150 Gujarati films. Arvind has also worked as a lead actor opposite to Mona Thiba in the film 'Dikri no Mandvo'. He has written, composed and sung all the songs of the film Desh Re Joya Dada Pardesh Joya, which is one of the highest-grossing Gujarati films of all time. He also composed music for famous Gujarati films, Maiyar Ma Mandu Nathi Lagtu and Gam Ma Piyariyu Ne Gam Ma Sasariyu.

== Award ==
In 2016, Arvind has received the Kavi Kag Award from Morari Bapu.
