= Aagantuk =

2023 Indian film directed by Naitik Raval

- Directed by: Naitik Raval
- Written by: Naitik Raval
- Produced by: Naitik Raval; Utsav Naik; Rishi Vyas; Shyam Nair
- Starring: Utsav Naik; Hiten Kumar; Netri Trivedi
- Cinematography: Jignesh Pandya
- Music by: Soham Naik; Tapan Jyoti Dutta (background score)
- Production companies: Filmustav Productions; Gallops Talkies
- Distributed by: Rupam Entertainment
- Release date: 17 February 2023
- Running time: 103 minutes
- Country: India
- Language: Gujarati

Aagantuk is a 2023 Gujarati thriller film directed by Naitik Raval. It stars Utsav Naik, Hiten Kumar and Netri Trivedi in lead roles. It is produced by Naitik Raval, Utsav Naik, Rishi Vyas and Shyam Nair, and distributed by Rupam Entertainment Pvt. Ltd. The music is composed by Tapan Jyoti Dutta and Soham Naik. It was released on 17 February 2023.

== Cast ==
- Utsav Naik
- Hiten Kumar
- Netri Trivedi
- Sonali Lele Desai
- Shriya Tiwari
- Rishi Vyas

== Production ==
It is produced under the banner of filmustav production and gallops talkies. The music of the film has given by Tapan Jyoti Dutta and song Composed by debutant Soham Naik, and emerging costume designer Priyanka Trivedi has designed the costume of the film. Kajal Hemal Mehta and Naitik Raval wrote screenplay and dialogues.

== Soundtrack ==
Aagantuk

Studio album by Soham Naik
- Released: 3 February 2023
- Genre: Feature film soundtrack
- Label: Shemaroo Entertainment

=== Tracklist ===
All lyrics are written by Swaggy The Rapper & Vidhi Raval; all music is composed by Soham Naik.

No.	Title	Lyrics	Music	Singer(s)	Length
1.	"Aagantuk Title Track"	Swaggy The Rapper	Soham Naik	Soham Naik	3:00
2.	"Andhkar"	Vidhi Raval	Soham Naik	Soham Naik	2:13

== Marketing and release ==
The release date was announced on 25 December 2022. The trailer was released on 30 January 2023. The film was released on 17 February 2023. Shemaroo Entertainment has acquired the music rights of the film. Colors Gujarati did marketing and promotion.

== Reception ==
Shilpa Bhanushali of Mid-Day Gujarati rated it 1.5 out of 5. She praised performances, cinematography and music while criticised story, script, direction and editing.

== Accolades ==
The film received 3 nominations at the 21st Transmedia Gujarati Awards.

== See also ==
- List of Gujarati films of 2023
