= Govindbhai Patel =

Govindbhai Patel was Gujarati filmmaker known for his superhits Dhola Maru and Desh Re Joya Dada Pardesh Joya.

== Early life ==
Govindbhai Patel was born on 11 January 1943. He hailed from Keshod, Gujarat. He administered cinema hall before entering in filmmaking. Around 1980, he started producing Gujarati films under GN Films banner. Dhola Maru (1983) was his first superhit film. He later produced several successful films including Jode Rehjo Raj, Saibo Sava Lakhno, Sejal Sarju, Hiran Ne Kanthe, Patan thi Pakistan, Taro Malak Mare Jovo Chhe, Gamma Piyariyu ne Gamma Sasariyu, Dholi Taro Dhol Vage (2005). His Desh Re Joya Dada Pardesh Joya (1998) was commercially superhit and earned more than ₹ 10 crore.

He died on 15 April 2015 at Vadodara. He was cremated at Khaswadi crematorium.

== Personal life ==
Goavindbhai Patel was married to Chandrikaben and had three sons and a daughter.

== Filmography ==
- Dhola Maru
- Hiran Ne Kanthe
- Sajan Tara Sambharna
- Moti Verana Chokma
- Jode Rahejo Raj
- Ladi Lakhani Saybo Sawa Lakhno
- Laju Lakhan
- Tahuke Sajan Sambhare
- Raj Rajwan
- Hu Tari Mira Ne Tu Maro Shyam
- Tara Rudiya Ni Rani Bol Bandhani
- Unchi Medi Na Uncha Mol
- Desh Re Joya Dada Pardesh Joya (1998)
- Sejal Sarju
- Amdavad Palanpur Vaya Kadi Kalol
- Gamma Piyariyu Gamma Sasariyu
- Taro Malak Mare Jovo Che
- Maihar No Mandavo Preetno Panetar
- Moghera Mulni Chundadi Ho Sahiba
- Dholi Taro Dhol Vaage (2005)
- Patan thi Pakistan
