= Sanghavi and Sons =

2025 Indian Gujarati Family drama film

- Directed by: Chandresh Bhatt
- Written by: Chandresh Bhatt; Jayprit Vasava; Archana Desai; Krutarth Bhatt
- Produced by: Raju Raisinghani; Anand Khamar; Aakash Desai; Ankur Adhiya; Sanjay Bhatt; Heet Doshi
- Starring: Manoj Joshi; Hiten Tejwani; Komal Thacker; Gaurav Paswala; Dharmesh Vyas
- Cinematography: Suraj Kurade
- Edited by: Tushar Parekh
- Music by: Kedar Bhargav
- Production company: Cineaste Studios
- Distributed by: Rupam Entertainment Pvt Ltd
- Release date: 18 July 2025
- Running time: 158 minutes
- Country: India
- Language: Gujarati

Sanghavi and Sons (Gujarati: સંઘવી એન્ડ સન્સ) is a 2025 Indian Gujarati family drama film directed by Chandresh Bhatt. It stars Manoj Joshi, Hiten Tejwani, Komal Thacker, Gaurav Paswala, Dharmesh Vyas and others. The film is produced by Raju Raisinghani, Anand Khamar, Aakash Desai, Ankur Adhiya, Sanjay Bhatt, Heet Doshi and it was released on 18 July 2025.

== Plot ==
This is the tale of Navneet Rai Sanghavi and his family. In the bustling world of tradition and modernity, Navneetrai Prabhudas Sanghavi stands as an unwavering pillar, holding his family together like pearls on a timeless thread. His sons, Asmit and Aditya, share a bond so pure and unshakable that words can barely capture its essence. At the heart of this harmonious family is Komal, the compassionate and resilient daughter-in-law who weaves their lives into a tapestry of love and unity. But when destiny strikes with unforeseen trials, the Sanghavi family's unity is put to the ultimate test. As the threads of their bond begin to fray, their strength, resilience and love face challenges they never imagined. 'Sanghavi and Sons' is not just a story of a family - it's a testament to love, sacrifice, and the indomitable spirit of togetherness in the face of life's greatest adversities.

== Cast ==
- Manoj Joshi as Navneet Rai Sanghavi
- Hiten Tejwani as Asmit Sanghavi
- Komal Thacker as Komal
- Gaurav Paswala as Aditya Sanghavi
- Dharmesh Vyas as Darshan Shah
- Kinjal Dhamecha as Radhika
- Firoz Irani as Dheerajlal Fua
- Makrand Shukla as Indravardhan Mama
- Nisarg Trivedi as Hasmukh Rai Sanghavi
- Bhavini Jani as Bhabhu
- Kalpana Gagdekar as Jashu Masi
- Hetal Parmar as Sarlaben Sanghavi
- Sunil Vishrani as Vinodrai Masa
- Prem Gadhavi as Pravin Kumar Urf PK
- Priyanka Patel as Chetna
- Maulik Chauhan as Kevin
- Satvi Choksi as Rutvi
- Nakshraaj as Pratik Sanghavi
- Aditi Vyas as Aditi
- Angira Vyas as Angira
- Bansi Rajput as Kusumben Sanghavi
- Morli Patel as Jashoda Fai
- Riddhi Raval as Devi Mami
- Jahanvi Patel as Hansa Shah
- Utsav Naik as Siddharth
- Nikhil Harsh as Varun
- Divyam Patel as Yash
- Khyat Bhatt as Vihan
- Jihan Rathod as Jihan
- Anshu Joshi as Mansukhlal
- Vedant Deb as Parag Vyas
- Dr Mukesh Bavishi as Mukesh Bavishi

== Soundtrack ==
Sanghavi and Sons

Studio album by Kedar-Bhargav
- Released: 2025
- Recorded: 2025
- Genre: Feature film soundtrack
- Length: 17:38
- Language: Gujarati
- Label: Shemaroo Entertainment
External audio
- Sanghavi and Sons Full Album on JioSaavn

=== Tracklist ===
All lyrics are written by Bhargav Purohit; all music is composed by Kedar-Bhargav.

No.	Title	Lyrics	Music	Singer(s)	Length
1.	"Varghodo"	Bhargav Purohit	Kedar-Bhargav	Jignesh Kaviraj	2:17
2.	"Rang Gheli Raat"	Bhargav Purohit	Kedar-Bhargav	Aishwarya Majmudar	3:50
3.	"Pithi Re Cholaavo Raj"	Bhargav Purohit	Kedar-Bhargav	Vrattini Ghadge	3:04
4.	"Veera Mara"	Bhargav Purohit	Kedar-Bhargav	Ishani Dave, Jigardan Gadhavi	3:23
5.	"Govardhan"	Traditional	Kedar-Bhargav	Hiren Bhatt	5:04
Total length:					17:38

== Production ==
The film was shot at various locations, including Ahmedabad, Madhavpur Ghed, the legendary site where Krishna married Rukmini and Vrindavan.

== Marketing and releases ==
The film was announced on 19 December 2024. The official teaser was released on 25 December 2024 on YouTube and other social media platforms. The trailer was officially launched on 22 June 2025 in Andheri, Mumbai, and released online on 23 June 2025 across YouTube and social media. The film's first song, Varghodo, was launched on Shemaroo Entertainment’s YouTube channel on 8 July 2025. The song is sung by Jignesh Kaviraj.

== See also ==
- List of Gujarati films of 2025
- List of Gujarati films
