= Chandan Ka Palna Resham Ki Dori =

- A promotional logo image of "Chandan Ka Palna Resham Ki Dori".
- Created by: Sankraman Telefilms
- Starring: see below
- Theme music composer: Rajesh Johri
- Opening theme: "Chandan Ka Palna Resham Ki Dori" by ??
- Country of origin: India
- Original language: Hindi
- No. of episodes: Total 98

Production
- Producer: Sanjay M. Bhatia
- Running time: approx. 23 minutes

Original release
- Network: Zee TV
- Release: 26 March – 8 August 2001

Chandan Ka Palna Resham Ki Dori is a television serial that appeared on Zee TV channel in 2001. The series aired every Monday to Friday at 9pm IST. The show was inspired from the Hindi movie Chori Chori Chupke Chupke, and deals with the somewhat taboo subject of a childless couple and a surrogate mother.

== Synopsis ==
The story revolves around the Bhimani family, where the head of household, Mr. Bhimani pressures his son to produce a 'male heir' for their business empire. But he is unaware of the situation that his son and daughter-in-law are unable to have a child due to medical issues. However, to fulfill the desire of their father, the hapless couple get into an arrangement with another woman to be a surrogate mother for their male child. But just when everything seems to be going smoothly between the husband, the wife and the would-be mother of the child, complications arrive and a drama starts enfolding that threatens to blow in the face of the once happy family.

== Cast ==
- Vikram Gokhale as Mr Jitendra Bhimani: The head of the family. Nirang, Mitali, Prashant, Ritish and Priya's father
- Apara Mehta—Kusum: Virendra's wife
- Pramatesh Mehta as Virendra Parekh: Kusum's husband
- Ragini Shah—Mrs. Janki Bhimani: Jitendra's first wife and Nirang, Mitali, Prashant, Ritish and Priya's mother
- Darshan Zariwala—Nirang Bhimani: Jitendra's eldest son and Mitali's twin
- Sajni Hanspal—Ruchi Bhimani: Nirang's wife
- Supriya Karnik —Mitali Bhimani: Jeetendra's eldest daughter and Nirang's twin
- Manoj Joshi as Prashant Bhimani: Shikha's husband
- Resham Tipnis as Shikha Bhimani: Prashant's wife and Reema's mother
- Sanjeev Seth—Ritish Bhimani: Jitendra's youngest son
- Suchita Trivedi—Binita Bhimani: Ritish's childless wife
- Vaishnavi Mahant—Shreya Dalal (the surrogate mother)
