= Hameer (film) =

- Official Poster
- Directed by: Ashok Patel
- Written by: Ashok Patel
- Produced by: Rashmin Majithia
- Starring: Ravi Kishan; Hiten Kumar; Yashpal Sharma; Mohan Joshi; Chandni Chopra; Komal Thacker; Dhawan Mewada
- Cinematography: Hitesh Beldar
- Edited by: Hitesh Beldar
- Music by: Keerthi Sagathia
- Production company: Coconut Motion Pictures
- Distributed by: Coconut Movies
- Release date: 13 January 2017
- Running time: 134 minutes
- Country: India
- Language: Gujarati

Hameer is an Indian Gujarati romantic action thriller film produced by Rashmin Majithia, under the banner Coconut Motion Pictures written and directed by Ashok Patel. Starring Hiten Kumar, Yashpal Sharma, Mohan Joshi and Chandni Chopra, it is a revenge story of a common farmer's family. The Bhojpuri superstar Ravi Kishan made his Gujarati debut with this feature film released on 13 January 2017.

== Plot ==
The film Hameer is a revenge story of how a common farmer Veersingh's family fights the tyranny of a vicious villain Hameer.

== Cast ==
- Hiten Kumar as Ismail Khan
- Ravi Kishan as Veersingh/ Raghuveer
- Yashpal Sharma as Hameer
- Mohan Joshi as Jashwant
- Chandni Chopra as Kesar
- Komal Thacker as Shakila
- Dhawan Mewada as Rahul
- Rana Jang Bahadur as P.S.I.Ramprasad
- Guru Patel as Rocky
- Riya Mehta as Kajal
- Rakesh Pujara as Zoravar
- Heena Rajput as Janaki
- Scarlett Mellish Wilson as item number "Tapka Doon"

== Production ==
=== Development ===
After announcing the film on 1 May 2016, Rashmin Majithia and Coconut Motion Pictures started the production work of their first Gujarati film on 14 May. The film is written and directed by Ashok Patel. Keerthi Sagathia directed the music for Hameer, while singers like Kirtidan Gadhvi, Rekha Bhardwaj, Aishwarya Majumdar, Namrata Karwa, Sana, Aditi Paul, Nisha Upadhyay, Nitin Barot, and Chinmayi gave their voice for this movie's songs.

=== Filming ===
The film was set and shot in Palanpur, Idar, Polo forest, and some other locations in Gujarat.

=== Casting ===
Leading names from Gujarati, Bhojpuri and Indian film industry such as Ravi Kishan, Hiten Kumar, Yashpal Sharma and Chandni Chopra signed the film, playing the lead roles. Mohan Joshi, Komal Thacker, Dhawan Mewada, Rana Jang Bahadur, Guru Patel, Riya Mehta, Heena Rajput, and Rakesh Pujara roped in for the supporting roles in the movie.

== Soundtrack ==
Music for the film is directed by Keerthi Sagathia, and the lyrics are written by Ashok Patel. On the music launch event organized on 6 January 2017, Zen Music Gujarati released the below soundtracks.

== Soundtrack ==
Hameer

Soundtrack album by Keerthi Sagathia
- Released: 6 January 2017
- Genre: Feature film soundtrack
- Length: 16:37
- Language: Gujarati
- Label: Zen Music Gujarati
External audio
- Album on JioSaavn

Sr. No.	Title	Lyrics	Music	Singer(s)
1.	"Zarmar Varse Mehuliyo"	Ashok Patel	Keerthi Sagathia	Keerthi Sagathia & Chinmayi
2.	"Hu Chu Meera Prem Deewani"	Ashok Patel	Keerthi Sagathia	Keerthi Sagathia, Sana & Aditi Paul
3.	"Hu Chu Meera Prem Deewani (Sad Version)"	Ashok Patel	Keerthi Sagathia	Keerthi Sagathia, Sana & Aditi Paul
4.	"Kol Didha Ta Pritam Mara"	Ashok Patel	Anand-Milind	Nisha Upadhyay
5.	"Raat Rangili Jhume Jawani"	Ashok Patel	Keerthi Sagathia	Kirtidan Gadhvi & Aishwarya Majumdar
6.	"Shurveer Che Tu"	Ashok Patel	Anand-Milind	Nisha Upadhyay
7.	"Tu Mane Haare Leto Jaa"	Ashok Patel	Keerthi Sagathia	Keerthi Sagathia & Rekha Bhardwaj
8.	"Bhalene Dole Dungra"	Ashok Patel	Shailesh-Utpal	Nitin Barot
9.	"Roiroine Varso Vitavya"	Ashok Patel	Anand-Milind	Nisha Upadhyay
10.	"Tu Mane Haare Leto Jaa"	Ashok Patel	Keerthi Sagathia	Rekha Bhardwaj
11.	"Tapka Doon"	Ashok Patel	Abuzar Rizvi	Namrata Karwa
