= Kabanda (film) =

2026 film directed by Rehan Chaudhary

- Official Poster
- Directed by: Rehan Chaudhary
- Written by: Rehan Chaudhary
- Produced by: Vedant Maheshwari; Rehan Chaudhary
- Starring: Shyam Nair; Tarjanee Bhadla; Brinda Trivedi
- Cinematography: Jignesh Pandya
- Edited by: Pallav Baruah; Rehan Chaudhary
- Music by: Pallav Baruah
- Production companies: February 30 Entertainment; Rehan Chaudhary Films Pvt. Ltd
- Distributed by: Rupam Entertainment Pvt. Ltd
- Release date: 29 May 2026
- Country: India
- Language: Gujarati

Kabanda is a 2026 Gujarati Supernatural thriller, written and directed by Rehan Chaudhary.Starring Shyam Nair, Tarjanee Bhadla, Brinda Trivedi and others The film is produced under the banner of February 30 Entertainment by Vedant Maheshwari. In association with Rehan Chaudhary Films Pvt. Ltd by Rehan Chaudhary. The film was released in theatres on 29 May 2026.

== Plot ==
In a remote farmhouse, blind Anu's weekend turns into a nightmare when her boyfriend Vedant is possessed by Kabanda, a vengeful demon. Trapped and deceived, she must use her heightened senses to outsmart the evil wearing his face.

== Cast ==
- Shyam Nair as Vedant
- Tarjanee Bhadla as Anu
- Brinda Trivedi as Inspector Kaliki
- Ruchita Chothani as Drashti
- Ankit Brahmbhatt as Sumit
- Hemang Shah

== Marketing and Releases ==
The film was announced on 21 April 2026 through social media. Its teaser was released on 7 May 2026, followed by the trailer on 16 May 2026. The film was released in theatres on 29 May 2026.

=== Sequel ===
In June 2026, director Rehan Chaudhary announced a sequel titled Kabanda 2. According to Chaudhary, the sequel is intended to expand the story of the first film and will feature a darker narrative. The film was announced following the theatrical release of Kabanda.

== See also ==
- List of Gujarati films of 2026
