= Patan Thi Pakistan =

2013 Gujarati film

- Official Poster
- Directed by: Haresh G. Patel
- Produced by: Govindbhai Patel
- Starring: Vikram Thakor; Pranjal Bhatt; Firoz Irani; Yamini Joshi; Bimal Trivedi
- Production company: H. G. Pictures
- Release date: 1 November 2013
- Country: India
- Language: Gujarati

Patan Thi Pakistan (lit. 'From Patan to Pakistan') is a 2013 Gujarati film, starring Vikram Thakor, Pranjal Bhatt and Firoz Irani. Jaimini Trivedi, Paresh Bhatt, Bimal Trivedi, Kaushika Goswami, Rohit Mehta and Trambak Joshi acted in supporting role. Directed by Haresh Patel and produced by Govindbhai Patel, The film tells the story of an inter-religious couple. It was released on 1 November 2013 and was a blockbuster of the year. The film is loosely based on 2001 Hindi film Gadar: Ek Prem Katha.

== Plot ==
The film's story follows a Pakistani girl (Pranjal Bhatt) who comes to India for Jihadi mission and falls in love with Indian Gujarati boy (Vikram Thakor). She decides to marry with him against her family's wish.

== Release ==
The movie was released in 2013, and became a blockbuster of the year. It was screened again in 2017 on the Independence Day.

The film was shot in Patan.

== Accolades ==
The film received 12 nominations at Transmedia Award 2014 in different categories. Vikram Thakor won the Best Actor Award for the film, and Haresh Patel won the Best Director Award.
