= Sanjeev Seth =

Indian television actor (born 1961)

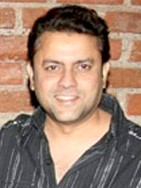
- Seth in 2012
- Born: 29 December 1961 (age 64); Mumbai, Maharashtra, India
- Occupation: Actor
- Years active: 1993–present
- Known for: Yeh Rishta Kya Kehlata Hai; Campus; Yeh Rishtey Hain Pyaar Ke
- Spouses: Resham Tipnis (m. 1993; div. 2004) Lata Sabharwal (m. 2009; sep. 2025)
- Children: Rishika Seth (daughter); Manav Seth, Aarav Seth (son)

YouTube information
- Channel: Khau Dost Sanjeev Seth
- Subscribers: 113 thousand
- Views: 29 million
- Last updated: 17 April 2025

Sanjeev Seth is an Indian actor who primarily works in Hindi television and films. Seth is best known for playing Vishambharnath Maheshwari in Yeh Rishta Kya Kehlata Hai and its spin-off Yeh Rishtey Hain Pyaar Ke.

== Personal life ==
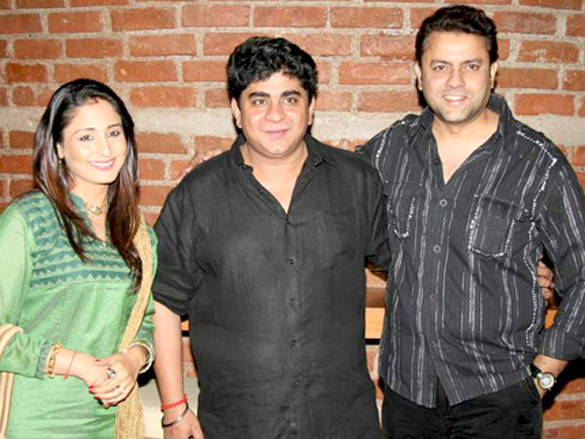
Lata Sabharwal, Rajan Shahi and Sanjeev Seth (from left)

Sanjeev was married to actress Lata Sabharwal Seth. They met on the sets of Yeh Rishta Kya Kehlata Hai. They have one son, Aarav Seth, who was born in 2013. They announced their divorce on June 21, 2025.

Sanjeev was previously married to actress Resham Tipnis with whom he has a son Manav and a daughter. They divorced in 2004.

== Career ==
In his early years, Seth appeared in the 1993 television serial Campus. Seth made his career with Karishma Kaa Karishma as Vikaram and then Seth signed for the role of Vishambharnath Maheshwari in the Star Plus television serial Yeh Rishta Kya Kehlata Hai. Sanjeev and his wife Lata also appeared in the Star Plus dance show Nach Baliye 6 in 2013. Seth reprised his role as Vishambharnath Maheshwari in Yeh Rishtey Hain Pyaar Ke, the spin-off series of Yeh Rishta Kya Kehlata Hai.

== Television ==
Year	Serial	Role	Notes
	Umeed		
	Raahat		
1993–1997	Campus		Negative Role
1995	Karm	Mushtaq Ali	Supporting Role
1997	Zee Horror Show: Anhonee Episode:- Mangalsutra: Part 1 to Part 5	Vilas	Episodic Role
1998	Zee Horror Show: Anhonee Episode:- Pyaas: Part 1 to Part 4	Karan Kapoor	Episodic Role
1998	C.I.D.	Sub Inspector Sanjeev	Supporting Role
1998; 1999	Aahat	Tushar (Episode 136–137), Suraj/Ajay (episode !70-171)	Episodic Role
1998–1999	Lakeerein		
1998	Rishtey– Anjali	Michael (Episode 37)	Episodic Role
1998–2001	Aashirwad	Vijay Mansingha	Negative Role
1998–2003	Deewar	Gautam	Supporting Role
1999	Zee Horror Show: Anhonee Episode:- Tejori: Part 1 to Part 3	Vinod Saxena	Episodic Role
1999	X Zone – Karma: Part 1 & Part 2	Episode 55 & Episode 56	Episodic Role
2000	Zee Horror Show: Anhonee Episode:– Shraap: Part 1 to Part 3	Vinod	Episodic Role
2000–2002	Mehndi Tere Naam Ki	Akash	Supporting Role
2001	Chandan Ka Palna Resham Ki Dori	Shikha played by (Resham Tipnis) his real life wife's husband	
2002–2006	Astitva...Ek Prem Kahani	Rohit	Supporting Role
2003–2004	Karishma Kaa Karishma	Vikram	Lead Role
2004	Raat Hone Ko Hai – Ateet : Part 1 to Part 4	Episode 25 to Episode 28	Episodic Role
2004	Kartika		Supporting Role
2007–2008	Woh Rehne Waali Mehlon Ki	Abhay Parashar	Supporting Role
2009–2019	Yeh Rishta Kya Kehlata Hai	Vishambharnath Maheshwari	Supporting Role
2019	Ek Thi Rani Ek Tha Raavan	Shivraj Sisodia	Supporting Role
2019–2020	Yeh Rishtey Hain Pyaar Ke	Vishambharnath Maheshwari	Supporting Role
2023	Dear Ishq	Raman Razdan	Supporting Role
2025–2026	Jhanak	Jyotirmay "Dadabhai" Chatterjee	Supporting Role
2026–present	Yeh Fitoor Tera	Sanjeev Saxena	Supporting Role

== Filmography ==
=== Films ===
Year	Title	Role	Notes
2024	Maharaj	Karsan's maternal uncle	
2025	De De Pyaar De 2	Kittu's father	

== Reality Shows ==
Year	Show	Role
2013	Nach Baliye 6	Contestant
