= Mahesh Kanodia =

Indian singer and politician (1937–2020)

MP, Lok Sabha
- In office 1991-1999, 2004-2009
- Constituency: Patan

Personal details
- Born: 27 January 1937 Kanoda, Patan, British India
- Died: 25 October 2020 (aged 83) Gandhinagar, Gujarat, India
- Party: Bharatiya Janata Party
- Spouse: Uma Kanodia (m. 1960)
- Children: Pooja Kanodia
- Relatives: Naresh Kanodia (brother); Hitu Kanodia (nephew)
- Occupation: Singer, musician, politician
- Awards: Padma Shri (posthumously, 2021)

Mahesh Kanodia (27 January 1937 – 25 October 2020) was a singer and a politician from Gujarat state in India.

== Biography ==
Mahesh Kanodia was born on 27 January 1937, at Kanoda village (now in Patan district, Gujarat), India. He completed his primary education from Shahpur School in Ahmedabad. He worked in Gujarati cinema for four decades as a musician, singer and composer. He performed with his actor-singer brother Naresh Kanodia.

He represented the Patan constituency in Lok Sabha four times (10th, 11th, 12th and 14th) as a member of the Bharatiya Janata Party, 1991–1999, and 2004–2009.

Sauna Hridayma Hammesh: Mahesh-Naresh, an autobiographical Gujarati book on brothers was published in 2011.

He died on 25 October 2020, in Gandhinagar from COVID-19 during the COVID-19 pandemic in India. He had paralysis for six years before his death.

== Awards ==
Mahesh Kanodia received the following details among the awards given by Gujarat Government to Gujarati film artists.

- Award for Best Music for the film Jigar and Ami (1970–71) (as a composer)
- Award for Best Music for the film Tanariri (1974–75) (as a composer)
- Award for the second best film for the film Jog Sanjog (1980/81) (as a producer)
- Award for the best music for the film Jog Sanjog (1980/81) (as a composer)
- Award for Best Playback Singer for the film Akhand Chudlo (1981/82)
- Award for the best music for the film Laju Lakhan (1991/92) (as a composer)

== Personal life ==
He married Uma on 1 January 1960. Their daughter Pooja, a singer, died in 2015. His nephew Hitu Kanodia is an actor and politician.

== Recognition ==
Kanodia was posthumously awarded Padma Shri in 2021.
