= Meru Malan =

- Official poster
- Directed by: Mehul Kumar
- Produced by: Mehul Kumar
- Starring: Naresh Kanodia; Snehalata; Firoz Irani
- Release date: 1985
- Country: India
- Language: Gujarati

Meru Malan is a 1985 Gujarati romantic drama film, starring Naresh Kanodia, Snehalata, Firoz Irani, directed by Mehul Kumar. It was the most successful film of the year, and became a super hit in the rural era.The superhit songs are penned by Kanti Ashok and music is composed by Mahesh Naresh duo.

== Cast ==
- Naresh Kanodia as Meru
- Snehalata as Malan
- Firoz Irani
- Hitu Kanodia as a child actor

== Soundtrack ==
The film's songs like Tu Maro Meru Tu Mari Malan, Jaag Re Malan Jaag, Ke Odhni Odhu Odhu Ne Udi Jaye were chartbuster and are evergreen hits till the date. The song Ke Odhni Odhu Odhu, sung by Alka Yagnik and Praful Dave, was a megahit and has been widely cited as one of the popular songs in Gujarati film. It inspired the 2019 Hindi films song Odhani from the movie Made in China.

Meru Malan

Soundtrack album
- Released: 31 December 1985
- Genre: Feature film soundtrack
- Length: 25:00
- Label: Saregama

Track list
No.	Title	Lyrics	Singer(s)	Length
1.	"Ke Odhni Odhu Odhu Ne Udi Jaye"	Kanti Ashok	Alka Yagnik, Praful Dave	5:58
2.	"Jaag Re Maalan Jaag"	Kanti Ashok	Praful Dave	3:34
3.	"O Roop Raseela Chora"	Kanti Ashok	Alka Yagnik, Praful Dave	6:43
4.	"Tu Maro Meru Tu Mari Malan"	Kanti Ashok	Usha Mangeshkar, Viraj Upadhyay	3:04
5.	"Naach Re Gori Naach"	Kanti Ashok	Alka Yagnik, Manzoor Hussain	5:41
Total length:				25:00
