= Zamane Se Kya Darna =

- Directed by: Bobby Raj
- Written by: Shyam Goel
- Story by: Rajeev Kaul
- Starring: Sanjay Dutt; Raveena Tandon; Shakti Kapoor; Raza Murad; Johnny Lever
- Music by: Anand–Milind
- Release date: 14 January 1994
- Running time: 175 mins
- Country: India
- Language: Hindi
- Budget: ₹2.40 crore
- Box office: ₹7.67 crore

Zamane Se Kya Darna is a 1994 Bollywood film directed by actress Anita Raj's brother Bobby Raj, starring Sanjay Dutt, Raveena Tandon, Alok Nath, Shakti Kapoor, Gulshan Grover, Johny Lever and Raza Murad.

== Cast ==
- Sanjay Dutt as Vikram Singh "Vicky"
- Raveena Tandon as Anju
- Aloknath as Veerendra Singh / Sardar Rajpal
- Reema Lagoo as Shalini Singh "Shalu"
- Gulshan Grover as Bhairav
- Shakti Kapoor as Shakti Singh
- Raza Murad as Gajendra Singh
- Johnny Lever as Pickpocket
- Dinesh Hingoo as Chelaramani
- Roma Manek as Gauri
- Guddi Maruti as Guddi
- Shiva Rindani as Gypsy
- Ghanshyam Rohera as Dhania
- Ram Sethi as Pyarelal
- Sudhir as Gambler

== Music ==
Song	Singer
"Aaja Baahon Mein"	Udit Narayan
"Yaara Yaara Yaara"	Udit Narayan, Asha Bhosle
"Maine Tujhe"	Udit Narayan, Sadhana Sargam
"Tauba Jawani"	Amit Kumar, Sadhana Sargam
"Tanak Tun Tun"	Amit Kumar, Sadhana Sargam
"Aaja Re Aaja Re"	Sadhana Sargam
"Aankhon Se Hum"	Kumar Sanu, Alka Yagnik
