= Vipul K. Rawal =

Indian screenwriter

Vipul K Rawal
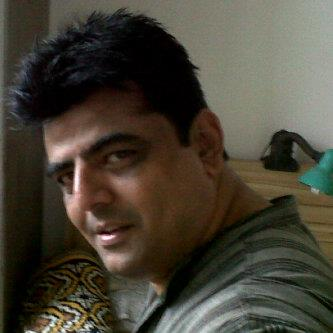
- Occupations: Scriptwriter; author
- Years active: 1997–present
- Spouse: Sindhu V Rawal (1993–present)
- Children: 2

Vipul K Rawal is an Indian scriptwriter, film maker, and author. Rawal's most recent film was Rustom starring Akshay Kumar for which Akshay Kumar won the National Award for the best actor. Rawal also wrote the episodic television series Vicky Ki Taxi, which centered on the life and adventures of a Mumbai taxi driver, and that was funded by Turner Broadcasting Corporation. He wrote another film, A New Love Ishtory. Audi Alteram Parten, a documentary written by him about the miscarriage of justice and the delay in implementation of Srikrishna Commission has been nominated in the Best Documentary and Audience Choice award at the Stuttgart Film Festival, Germany. Rawal regularly contributes articles for various newspapers, magazines and websites. He became a director and producer with a psychological thriller titled Tony that was released on 29 November 2019.

== Forthcoming projects ==
- Ahaan – A coming-of-age story about a boy with Down syndrome who is forced to live with an uncle who has Obsessive Compulsive Disorder. Adil Hussain plays the uncle, and for the first time in Indian cinema, a boy with Down Syndrome plays a lead role.

== Films as a producer/director ==
In 2019, he started a production company with the intent of producing small budget content based films under Rs. 1 Crore. His first film, Tony, was released on 29 November 2019 in 150 theaters across India and worldwide digitally. The film received high praise on IMDb and book my show with a rating of 8.5 on IMDb. The film also garnered decent reviews from the media and critics. The Times of India gave the film 2.5 rating out of 5 and said "All-in-all, 'TONY' tries, but fails to delve deep into the mind-set of a serial killer and turn it into a gripping murder mystery- psychological thriller. If you are a hunter of good content (and good content alone), go... scout for Tony!" Australian film blogger and indie film critic Richard Gary said "The film reminds me more of the crime shows that have been come out on cable from Europe recently, such as 'Ultraviolet' and 'The Valhalla Murders.' The moments of time stretching are definitely there, but overall, this is still a taut thriller, especially once you pass the 45-minute mark. While the ending I thought up was pretty good but not realized, this still passes the biting the fingernail test (figuratively, not literally)." FilmInk, a prominent Australian Film news website too gave a positive review to the film. "a dense tapestry that manages to engage and unsettle from end to end, with nary a dead spot in sight" said the website.

== First book ==
His first book titled फ़िल्म की कहानी कैसे लिखें published by Rajkamal Prakashan. The book teaches the fundamentals of script writing.

== Filmography ==
- A New Love Ishtory (2013) – Story
- Rustom (2016) – Story, screenplay, dialogues
- Mumbai Varanasi Express (Short Film) (2016) – Story and screenplay
- Batti Gul Meter Chalu (2018) – Original story concept
- Tony (2019) – Writer, Director
- Mission Raniganj (2023) – Screenplay

== TV show ==
- Vicky Ki Taxi (6 March 2009 – 19 June 2009) – Story, Screenplay, Dialogues

== Other activities ==
Rawal is an entrepreneur with interests in e-commerce and recruitment consultancy. He is the proprietor of eBiz India, a recruitment consultancy specializing in foreign language jobs.
