= Polam Pol =

- Official poster
- Directed by: Tejas Padiaa
- Written by: Tejas Padiaa
- Produced by: Gopal Dave, Sangeeta Milan Shah, Jatin Doshi, Nimesh Shah
- Starring: Jimit Trivedi; Ojas Rawal; Jinal Belani; Jayesh More; Prem Gadhavil; Sunil Vishrani
- Edited by: Rohit Makwana
- Music by: Paresh; Bhavesh
- Release date: 12 February 2016
- Country: India
- Language: Gujarati

Polam Pol (Gujarati: પોલમ પોલ) is a 2016 Gujarati comedy film directed by Tejas Padiaa. Presented by Lemon Grass Productions and produced by Gopal Dave, Sangeeta Milan Shah, Jatin Doshi and Nimesh Shah. The film is a comedy drama. The film stars Jimit Trivedi, Ojas Rawal, Jinal Belanil, Prem Gadhavi, Jayesh More, Sunil Vishrani & Sanat Vyas. The film releases on 12 February 2016.

== Cast ==
- Jimit Trivedi as Darshan (Duggi)
- Ojas Rawal as Manish (Montu)
- Jinal Belani as Anjali
- Jayesh More as Mangilal
- Prem Gadhavi as Bhikulal
- Sunil Vishrani
- Sanat Vyas

== Soundtrack ==
Polam Pol features songs sung by Farhad Bhiwandiwala, Nakash Aziz, Palak Muchhal, Shree Dayal, Ash King. Music and Background Score for the film is composed by Paresh-Bhavesh. The soundtrack was launched on 19 January.

No.	Title	Singer(s)	Length
1.	"Polam Pol - Title song"	Farhad Bhiwandiwala, Nakash Aziz
2.	"Sapnaao Sacha Thashe Sapnaao Sacha Thashe"	Farhad Bhiwandiwala, Palak Muchhal
3.	"Dil Jo Maaru Dil Jo Maaru"	Ash King, Farhad Bhiwandiwala

== Release ==
The official poster for the film was released on 4 January 2016. The first trailer was released online on 11 January 2016 and was received positively by the audience.
