= Hardik Abhinandan =

2016 film by Dev Keshwala

Hardik AbhiNandan
- Official poster
- Directed by: Dev Keshwala
- Written by: Dev Keshwala
- Produced by: Rati Kadegiya; Kapil Vyas
- Starring: Ragini Shah; Devarshi Shah; Gopal Parmar; Navjot Singh Chauhan; Vimmy Bhatt
- Cinematography: Prashant Gohel
- Edited by: Manish Mistry
- Music by: Sameer Phaterpekar
- Production companies: Kamdhenu Entertainments LLP (In Association with) DN Entertainment
- Release date: 11 November 2016
- Running time: 170 minutes
- Country: India
- Language: Gujarati

Hardik AbhiNandan (Gujarati: હાર્દિક અભિનંદન) is a 2016 Gujarati comedy starring veteran Gujarati actress Ragini Shah and debutant actors Devarshi Shah, Gopal Parmar and Navjot Singh Chauhan in the lead roles as the characters Hardik, Abhi and Nandan, respectively. The film is directed by Dev Keshwala and produced by Kamdhenu Entertainments LLP in association with DN Entertainment. The film's music is composed by Jigardan Gadhavi, and the background score is produced by Sameer Phaterpekar.

== Plot ==
Hardik, Abhi and Nandan are three small town boys who come to the metropolis Ahmedabad to pursue their graduate studies. The trio ends up living together as paying guests in the home of Mukta Masi (Ragini Shah). Owing to their individual quirks and unhinged new-found freedom, the three end up living extravagant and reckless lives. In the process, they go through a series of misadventures and find themselves at the center of an unfolding mystery. This coming-of-age tale with an important message is centered around the theme where culture shock plays a major role in leading youth astray and how close relationships can help us cope with the realities of life.

== Cast ==
- Ragini Shah as Mukta Masi
- Devarshi Shah as Hardik Mochi
- Gopal Parmar as Abhimanyusingh Zala
- Navjot Singh Chauhan as Nandan Patel
- Vimmy Bhatt as Aarti
- Akash Zala as Pappu Bhai
- Poojan Trivedi as Mohit
- Mitesh Moga as Dhaval
