= Divaswapna =

- Theatrical release poster
- Directed by: Satish Davara
- Written by: Naresh Prajapati
- Screenplay by: Jayesh K. Patel; Satish Davara; Sanjay Prajapati (Dialogues)
- Based on: Divaswapna - An Educator’s Reverie by Gijubhai Badheka
- Produced by: Naresh Prajapati
- Starring: Chetan Daiya; Pravin Gundecha; Garima Bhardwaj; Rittesh Mobh; Bimal Trivedi
- Cinematography: Prashant Gohel
- Edited by: Kanu Prajapati
- Music by: Parth Pithadiya
- Production company: K. D. Films
- Distributed by: Panorama Studios
- Release date: 10 December 2021
- Running time: 130 minutes
- Country: India
- Language: Gujarati

Divaswapna (Gujarati: દિવાસ્વપ્ન, transl. Divaswapna) is a 2021 Indian Gujarati drama film directed by Satish Davara. produced by Naresh Prajapati under the banner K. D. Films. The story is based on Divaswapna - An Educator's Reverie by Gijubhai Badheka. Starring Chetan Daiya, Pravin Gundecha, Garima Bhardwaj, Rittesh Mobh and Bimal Trivedi.

== Cast ==
- Chetan Daiya as Kachra
- Pravin Gundecha as Kanji
- Garima Bhardwaj as Anuas
- Rittesh Mobh as Narendra Sir
- Bimal Trivedi as Kalubha
- Kalpana Gagdekar as Nathi
- Devang Bhatt as Principal
- Richard Bhakti Klein as Professor of Israeli University

=== Filming ===
The film is set and shot in Padharia Village, Mehsana.

== Soundtrack ==
Divaswapna (Original Motion Picture Soundtrack)

Soundtrack album by Parth Pithadiya
- Released: 6 December 2021
- Genre: Feature film soundtrack
- Length: 14:03
- Language: Gujrati
- Label: K D Music Platform

Parth Pithadiya gave the Music of the film and the lyrics were penned by Naresh Prajapati . The Music of the film was released by K D Music Platform.

Track list
No.	Title	Lyrics	Singer(s)	Length
1.	"Radha Kare Yaad"	Naresh Prajapati	Parth Oza, Aparajita Singh	3:22
2.	"Taru Man Chhe Mangamatu"	Naresh Prajapati	Jigardan Gadhavi, Aparajita Singh	3:30
3.	"Tu Jagat No Tat Che"	Naresh Prajapati	Parth Oza	7:11
Total length:				14:03

== Release ==
The film was released on 10 December 2021 in India.

=== Home media ===
The film was premiered on YouTube from 19 October 2024.

== Accolades ==
Divaswapan is the first-ever Gujarati film that received 53 awards and 35 nominations worldwide. In 2022, Divaswapna won multiple GIFA Awards across various categories. At the prestigious Gujarat State Awards 2024, the blockbuster film 'Divaswapna' swept a remarkable five awards, marking a triumphant victory.

Award	Category	Recipient(s) and nominee(s)	Result
GIFA – Gujarati Iconic Film Awards 2022	Dialogue writer of the year	Naresh Prajapati, Sanjay Prajapati, Anshu Joshi	Won
GIFA – Gujarati Iconic Film Awards 2022	Playback singer of the year	Parth Oza	Won
GIFA – Gujarati Iconic Film Awards 2022	Actor of the year in supporting role	Chetan Daiya	Won
GIFA – Gujarati Iconic Film Awards 2022	Actor of the year in negative role	Bimal Trivedi	Won
Gujarat State Awards 2024	Best Popular Film of the Year	Producer: Naresh Prajapati (K.D. Films) Director: Satish Davara	Won
Gujarat State Awards 2024	Second Best Feature Film	Producer: Naresh Prajapati (K.D. Films) Director: Satish Davara	Won
Gujarat State Awards 2024	Best Supporting Actor	Chetan Daiya	Won
Gujarat State Awards 2024	Best Song of the Year	Parth Oza	Won
Gujarat State Awards 2024	Best Sound Mixing	Mr. Alok De	Won
