= Naresh Kanodia =

Indian actor (1943–2020)

- Born: Naresh Kanodia; 20 August 1943; Patan, British India
- Died: 27 October 2020 (aged 77); Ahmedabad, Gujarat, India
- Occupations: Actor, singer, musician, politician
- Spouse: Ratan Kanodia
- Children: 2, including Hitu Kanodia
- Relatives: Mahesh Kanodia (brother)
- Awards: Padma Shri (posthumously, 2021)

Naresh Kanodia (20 August 1943 – 27 October 2020) was an Indian Gujarati film actor, singer, musician, and politician from Gujarat.

== Early life ==
Naresh Kanodia was born on 20 August 1943 at the village of Kanoda (now in Patan district, Gujarat, India) in poor mill worker's family of Mithabhai Kanodia.

== Career ==
He started to perform as a stage singer and dancer along with his elder brother Mahesh Kanodia. They are one of the successful musical pairs in the Gujarati film industry, known as Mahesh-Naresh. During the 1980s he and his brother were the first Gujarati pair to travel overseas and perform as stage artists in locations including Africa, America and some other Asian countries. Kanodia started his career with the film Veli Ne Avya Phool (1970). The same year he also played a minor role in the film Jigar and Ami. He has acted more than 100 Gujarati films.

Some of his popular films are Jog Sanjog, Kanku Ni Kimat, Laju Lakhan, Unchi Medina Uncha Mol, Raj Rajvan, Man Saibani Medie, Dhola Maru, Meru Malan, Maa Baap Ne Bhulsho Nahi, Rajveer. The career of Naresh Kanodia spans four decades and he has worked with many leading actresses including Snehlata, Aruna Irani, Roma Manek. Naresh Kanodia, along with Upendra Trivedi, Asrani, Kiran Kumar represent the older generation of Gujarati cinema who went on to perform in many successful movies in the 1980s and 1990s.

He had served as a member of Gujarat Legislative Assembly representing Karjan constituency from 2002 to 2007.

Sauna Hridayma Hammesh: Mahesh-Naresh, an autobiographical Gujarati book on duo was published in 2011.

== Personal life ==
He married Ratan Kanodia and they had two sons, Hitu Kanodia and Suraj Kanodia. Hitu Kanodia is also an actor and politician. His brother Mahesh Kanodia was a Gujarati musician, singer and politician.

He died on 27 October 2020, at U. N. Mehta Institute of Cardiology and Research Centre in Ahmedabad of COVID-19 during the COVID-19 pandemic in India, two days after his elder brother Mahesh.

== Recognition ==
Kanodia was posthumously awarded Padma Shri in 2021.

== Selected filmography ==
- Abil Gullal
- Akhand Chudalo (1980)
- Aankhaladi Tarse Piyuni Vatma
- Angne Vage Ruda Dhol
- Aanganiya Sajavo Raj
- Bap Dhamal Dikara Kamal
- Bhathiji Maharaj
- Beni Huto Barbar varse aaviyo
- Dada ne Aangan Tulasi
- Dharamo
- Dhola Maru (1983)
- Daladu Lagyu Sayba Na Desh Ma (2002)
- Didhela Kol Raj Nahi re Bhulay
- Daladu Didhu Kartakna Melama
- Daldan Lidha Chori Raj
- Dholi (1982)
- Dholi Taro Dhol Waage
- Dewana Dushman (2014)
- Dodh Dahya (1983)
- Dukhada Khame E Dikari
- Govaliyo
- Garavo Gujarati
- Hal Bheru America
- Halo Aapna Malak Man
- Hiran ne Kanthe
- Hiral Hameer
- Jay Kuber Bhandari
- Jode Rejo Raj
- Jog Sanjog
- Jugal Jodi (1982)
- Jagya Tyathi Sawaar (1981)
- Kadla Ni Jod
- Kalajano Katako
- Khodiyar Chhe Jogmaya
- Kanku Ni Kimat (1983)
- Kanto Vagyo Kadje
- Kesar Chandan
- Ladi Lakhni Saybo Sava Lakhno
- Laju Lakhan
- Lakhtar Ni Ladi Vilayat No Var
- Lohi bhini Chundadi
- Maa Baap Ne Bhulsho Nahi
- Mane Vhalo Dikro, Dikrane Vhali Ma
- Man Saibani Medie
- Mane Rudiye Vala Bapa Sitaram
- Manigar Mara Malakno
- Marad No Mandvo (1983)
- Mara Man chhogala Dhola
- Mara Rudiye Rangana Tame Sajana
- Mare Todle Betho Mor
- Mari Laj Rakhje Vira
- Mari Mahendi Tare Haath
- Mendi Rang Lagyo
- Meru Malan
- Meru Mulande
- Moti Verana Chokma (Moti Veerana Chawk Ma)
- Narmadane Kanthe
- Odhu To Odhu Tari Chundadi
- Palavade Bandhi Preet
- Pankhida O Pankhida
- Parka Padarni Gorande
- Parbhav Ni Preet
- Paras Padamani
- Pardeshi Maniyaro
- Prem Gori Taro Kem Bhulay
- Preetna Sogandh
- Preet Gheli Radha
- Preet Pangre chori chori
- Preet Sayaba Na Bhulay
- Prem Gori Taro Kem Kari Bhulay
- Patel Ni Patelai Ane Thakor Ni Khandani (2016)
- Radhiyali Rat
- Radhani Badha
- Raj Kunvar
- Raj Rajvan
- Raj Ratna
- Rajveer
- Rudo Rabari
- Saubhagya Sindoor
- Sharadpoonamni Rat
- Sherne Mathe Savasher
- Sathiya Puravo Raj
- Sajan Haiye Sambhare
- Sajan Tara Sambharna
- Sant Savaiyanath
- Savariya Lai De Ho Rangni Chudi
- Samp Tya Jamp
- Sayba mora
- Sorathno Savaj
- Sonal Sundari
- Shree Nagdev Krupa
- Tahuke Sajan Sambhre
- Tana Riri
- Tane Parki Manu Ke Manu Potani
- Tamere Champo ne ame kel
- Tame Jitya ne Ame Harya
- Tejal Garasani
- Tu To Sajan Mara Kalje Korani
- Unchi Medina Uncha Mol
- Uncha Khoradani Khandani
- Ujali meraman
- Vanjari Vav
- Vagya Preetyuna Dhol
- Vagi Kalaje Katari Tara Premni (Guest Artist)
- Vat Vachan Ne Ver (1981)
- Vatno Katko
- Veli Ne Avya Phool
- Veer Bavavalo
- Tamere Champo ne ame ked
- Veer Bhathiji Maharaj
- Kaydo
- Taro Sur Mara Geet: Ek Sangeetmay Prem Katha (2015)
- Dhantya Open (2017)
- Zoolan Morali

Hindi

- Chhota Aadami (Hindi)

Rajasthani

- Dharambhai (Rajasthani, Producer-Ramraj Nahta, Director -Shantilal Soni, Music-J.P. Kaushik)
- Dhola Maru (Rajasthani, Dubbing Of Dholamaru)
- Biro Hove To Aiso (Rajasthani, Dubbing Of Unchi Medina Uncha Mol)

Bhojpuri

- Kasam Durga maiya ke (Dubbing Of Hitu Kanodia's Gujarati film Radhani Badha)
