= Ragini Shah =

Indian actress

- Occupation: Actress
- Years active: 1970–present
- Spouse: Deepak Gheewala

Ragini Shah is an Indian film, stage and television actress, and a veteran of Gujarati theatre. She had numerous supporting roles on Indian television, with her portrayal of Dugba in the daily Hindi soap Saraswatichandra being one of the most remembered.

== Career ==
Shah has appeared in more than 50 Gujarati films. She is also a director. Due to repetitive roles and financial limitations in the Gujarati industry, she moved to Mumbai, where she took part in some Hindi television serials and live performances. There she appeared in the lead role in the Gujarati-language TV drama, Moti Baa which was aired on ETV Gujarati.

Ragini also has numerous Hindi TV dramas to her credit. She made her debut with a supporting role in Chanakya in the early 1990s on Doordarshan. She appeared as Rashmi Shekhar Nanavati in the Hindi serial Ek Mahal Ho Sapno Ka on Sony TV in 1999, which remains to date one of the most popular comedy-dramas on Indian television. In 2001, she bagged a role in Chandan Ka Palna Resham Ki Dori, which was followed by a series of supporting and motherly roles in various Hindi soap operas. Shah is widely remembered for her role of Dugba in the romantic drama Saraswatichandra (2013–14), which was based on a novel of the same name; as well her portrayal of Maasa in Diya Aur Baati Hum (2011–16), which remains one of the highet-rated shows on Indian television.

She had a role in Harun Arun (2009), under the direction of Vinod Ganatra. Shah has also performed live all across India, as well in the UK and the USA.

From May 2017 to May 2018, Shah portrayed a parallel lead role of Dayavanti Mehta in Naamkarann on Star Plus. Producer Mahesh Bhatt approached Shah for the role, after the sudden demise of veteran actress Reema Lagoo, who was previously playing the same role.

Since February 2021, she is playing the role of Jaya Rao in Star Plus's Mehndi Hai Rachne Waali.

== Personal life ==
Ragini is married to actor-director Deepak Gheewala, with whom she worked with in the drama Gulaal. Gheewala has directed Gujarati shows like Jo Jo Moda Na Padta and Grahan, among others.

== Filmography ==
=== Television ===
- 1991 Chanakya as Chanakya's mother
- 2001 Chandan Ka Palna Resham Ki Dori as Mrs. Janki Bhimani
- 2009 Moti Baa (Gujarati Serial)
- 2011-2016 Diya Aur Baati Hum as Maa Saa
- 2013-2014 Saraswatichandra as Dubga Shahastrar
- 2017 Naamkarann as Dayawanti Mehta
- 2021 Mehndi Hai Rachne Waali as Jaya Rao
- 2024 United State Of Gujarat as Suryakanta Vaishnav (Gujarati Serial)

=== Selected films ===
- Daku Rani Ganga (1976, debut Gujarati film)
- Harun Arun (2009, Gujarati)
- Hardik Abhinandan (2016, Gujarati film)
- Dada Ho Dikari - Gujarati film
- Sasan - Gujarati film
