= Devarshi Shah =

Indian actor (born 1996)

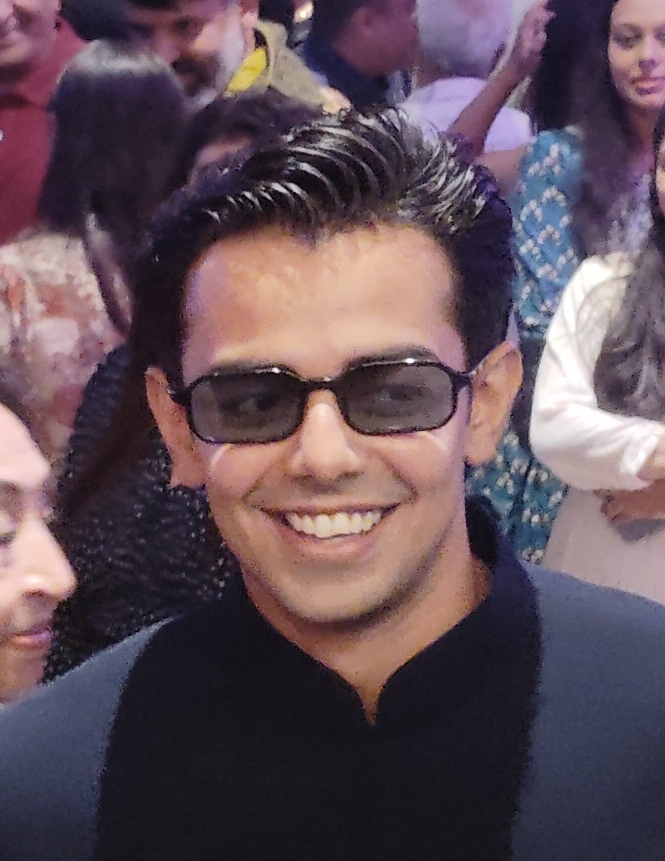
- in 2025
- Born: 7 August 1993 (age 32); Ahmedabad, Gujarat, India
- Occupation: Actor
- Years active: 2016–present

Devarshi Shah (born 07 August 1993) is an Indian actor from Gujarat, India. He is known for his role in Gujarati film Hardik Abhinandan (2016). He later starred in films like Bau Na Vichar (2019) and Raado (2022). He also appeared in TV serials Yeh Un Dinon Ki Baat Hai and Rishton Ka Chakravyuh.

== Career ==
Devarshi debuted in Gujarati cinema in 2016 with Hardik Abhinandan directed by Dev Keshwala. Later, he acted in Bau Na Vichar (2019) and Raado (2022).

== Filmography ==
Year	Film	Role	Language
2016	Hardik Abhinandan	Hardik Mochi	Gujarati
2019	Bau Na Vichar	Arun	Gujarati
2022	Raado	Neel	Gujarati
2023	Jaishree Krishh	TBA	Gujarati
2023	Kho Gaye Hum Kahan	Ashish	Hindi
2024	The Great Gujarati Matrimony	Ved	Gujarati
2025	Bachu Ni Benpani	Vicky	Gujarati
