= Vimmy Bhatt =

Indian actress

- Born: January 3
- Occupation: Actress
- Known for: SPEECHLESS, BLINK, THE TATTOO MURDERS, KAMATHIPURA, AASHA, BETI
- Notable work: SPEECHLESS, BLINK
- Spouse: Sachin Hejmadi

Vimmy Bhatt is an Indian actress and a trained Bharatanatyam dancer. She is known for her work in the Award-winning short film SPEECHLESS and Short film BLINK which earned accolades in several International Film Festivals . Vimmy Bhatt is also known as finest actress in Gujarati Film Industry followed by films Hardikabhinandan, Beti and Aasha. She has films and webseries currently streaming on several ott platforms and is set to make her debut in Hindi film Industry.

== Life and career ==
Vimmy was a Semi Finalist in the Femina Miss India Beauty Contest, 2002. She made her Television Debut by landing the role of 'Jwala' in the TV Series Dharti Ka Veer Yodha Prithviraj Chauhan in 2006, broadcast on Star Plus In 2013, Bhatt starred as a disabled character (Shikha) in the short film "SPEECHLESS" by team postmasters, following the success of which, in 2016, she made her feature film debut with the Gujarati film Hardik Abhinandan, she followed it up with a starring role in the 2018 short film "BLINK" which was nominated for "Best International Short Film" & "Best Science Fiction Short" at the Philip K. Dick Science Fiction Film Festival (2019).

Vimmy's upcoming Gujarati feature films are AASHA and BETI which were scheduled for a 2021 release.

Aside from Films and TV Series, Bhatt has appeared in video ad campaigns for Chevrolet(2013), Indian Tea Brands & print ad campaigns for Shoppers Stop, besides penning editorials and conceptual articles for New Woman (magazine).

== Television ==
Year	Show	Character	Language
2006	Prithviraj Chauhan for Star Plus	Jwala	Hindi
2007	Kayamath for Star Plus	Purvi	Hindi
2009	Bandhan Saat Janamo Ka for Colors	Dolly	Hindi
2010	Shorr for Sahara One	Sarita	Hindi
2014	Tari Ankh No Afini for Colors Gujarati	Sucharita	Gujarati
2015	AA Family Comedy Che for Colors Gujarati	Disha	Gujarati
2013	Savdhan India for Star Bharat	Sarita	Hindi

== Filmography ==
Year	Film	Character	Language
2013	SPEECHLESS	Shikha Sharma	Hindi/English
2016	Hardik Abhinandan	Aarti Patel	Gujarati
2018	Blink	Smriti	Hindi/English
2022	Aasha	Aasha	Gujarati
2021	Beti	Purvi	Gujarati

== Projects streaming on OTT ==
YEAR	FILM/WEBSERIES	OTT
2013	Speechless	YOUTUBE
2020	Blink	DISNEY PLUS HOTSTAR
2021	The Tattoo Murders	MX PLAYER
2023	AASHA	YOUTUBE
2024	Beti	SHEMAROOME
2024	Kamathipura	JIO CINEMA
2024	Blink	MX PLAYER

== Awards ==
Year	Award	Category	Role	Film/Television	Result
2013	48Hour Film Project	Best Actor (Female)	Shikha Sharma	Speechless	Won
2014	14th Annual Gujarati Screen & Stage Award	Best Actor (Female Lead)	Disha Shashtri	Aa Family Comedy Che	Won

- Vimmi was nominated by viewers as 'Favorite Bahu' for her role of Sucharita in "Tari Ankh No Afini" and 'Favorite Beti' for Disha Shashtri in "Aa Family Comedy Che" on Times of India.

== Books Published ==
- THE REVERSAL THOUGHT PROCESS-Mind your Mind.
- THE UNKNOWN LOVE-Complicated.
