= Tony (2019 film) =

2019 Hindi film directed by Vipul K Rawal

- Directed by: Vipul K Rawal
- Written by: Vipul K Rawal
- Produced by: Vipul K Rawal
- Starring: Yashodhan Rana, Akshay Varma
- Cinematography: Mohit Kakodkar
- Edited by: muhammed shahid
- Music by: Jyoti Prasad Das
- Release date: 15 November 2019
- Running time: 124 min
- Country: India
- Language: Hindi

Tony is a Hindi language psychological thriller film written and directed by Vipul K Rawal. The film was selected as an official selection at the Jagran Film Festival, Mumbai and Diorama International Film Festival, New Delhi. The film saw a limited theatrical release in 150 theaters in India on 29 November 2019. Digitally, the film has released on various digital platforms in Europe and Australia. Unlike most Hindi language films, Tony is a film without any songs.

== Plot ==
In order to do a class project differently and impress their teacher, four psychology students plant a camera in a Catholic church's confession box and come across a serial killer confessing to murders to the priest. In the same conversation, they find out that the killer is priest's brother. The upstart students then blackmail the priest to facilitate a meeting with Tony so that they can conduct his psychological analysis. All hell breaks loose when Tony meets them, befriends them, and the students get a taste of blood and want to experience how it feels to kill someone.

== Cast ==
- Yashodhan Rana As Tony
- Akshay Verma... As Inspector Sameer Dighe
- Manoj Chandila ...As Sub Inspector Vilas Mote
- Mahesh Jilowa...As Ashish
- Dhruv Souran... As Martin
- Jinal Belani... As Kamya
- Kabir Chilwal.

== Controversies ==
Though cleared by the censor board, the film invited controversy when a group filed a suit in high court against the film maker alleging the movie poster and trailer hurt the sentiments of Christians. The matter is sub judice in the Honorable Mumbai High Court.

== Receptions and reviews ==
The Times of India gave the film 2.5 rating out of 5 and said "All-in-all, 'TONY' tries, but fails to delve deep into the mind-set of a serial killer and turn it into a gripping murder mystery- psychological thriller. If you are a hunter of good content (and good content alone), go… scout for Tony!"

Australian film blogger and Indie Film critic Richard Gary said "The film reminds me more of the crime shows that have been come out on cable from Europe recently, such as "Ultraviolet" and "The Valhalla Murders". The moments of time stretching are definitely there, but overall, this is still a taut thriller, especially once you pass the 45-minute mark. While the ending I thought up was pretty good but not realized, this still passes the biting the fingernail test (figuratively, not literally)" Filmink, a prominent Australian Film news website too gave a positive review to the film. "a dense tapestry that manages to engage and unsettle from end to end, with nary a dead spot in sight" said the website.
