= Maiyar Ma Mandu Nathi Lagtu =

- Official Poster
- Directed by: Jashwant Gangani
- Written by: Jashwant Gangani
- Produced by: Jashwant Gangani
- Starring: Hiten Kumar; Arvind Trivedi; Firoz Irani; Dinesh Lamba
- Cinematography: Rafiq Latif Shaikh
- Edited by: Yusuf Sheikh
- Music by: Gaurang Vyas
- Production company: Gangani Film Production
- Distributed by: Galaxy Picture ( Rajkot )
- Release date: 27 June 2001
- Running time: 163 Minutes
- Country: India
- Language: Gujarati
- Budget: ₹1.4 crore (US$170,000)

Maiyar Ma Mandu Nathi Lagtu is a 2001 Indian Gujarati rom-com family drama film directed and produced by Jashwant Gangani, starring Hiten Kumar and Aanandee Tripathi in lead roles. The film won 9 Gujarat State Film Awards and 2 other festival awards, totaling 11 awards that year.

== Plot ==
Ram's brother and Ratan's sister are engaged. During their marriage, Ram and Ratan fall in love with each other. Both the family come closer with the hospitality of joint family and the game of Antakshari and as a result, Ram and Ratan also come closer. Subsequently, Ram and Ratan's wedding is decided. When Ram falls down during the marriage ritual in wedding-chapel, his father, because of Ram's playful nature, comments: "don't play here" and ignores the incident. When Ram's mother goes close to him, she understands the situation after seeing blood in his mouth. A doctor's report indicates that he has cancer. Due to this discovery, the wedding remains unfinished and both the lovers are lost in separation. Out of true love, Ratan proceeds to marry Ram, but everyone is sad on this happy occasion. Due to Ratan's faith in God and unbounded love, Ram has a successful operation and the story ends happily.

== Cast ==
- Hiten Kumar as Ram
- Aanandee Tripathi as Ratan
- Arvind Trivedi
- Firoz Irani
- Dinesh Lamba
- Devendra Pandit
- Mahesh Joshi
- Chandni Chopra
- Heena Rajput
- Zakir Khan
- Jayendra Mehta
- Tusharika Rajyaguru

== Production ==
The film was shot in Lucky Studios in Halol, and Rajpipla in Gujarat. The film set cost ₹30 lakh (US$35,000). Executive producer Raj Gangani, Associate Director Jitu Rathod, Assistant Director Ashvin Borad, Production Manage by Hemraj Baraiya, Ganesh Vaghani. The film was made on budget of ₹1.4 crore (US$170,000). It was filmed in Dolby Digital Sound.

== Release ==
The film was released on 27 June 2001.

The remastered version was re-released on 12 September 2025, on the occasion of 25th anniversary. It was 25 minutes shorter than the original.

== Reception ==
The film was screened in theatres for 52 weeks. It was declared superhit and later become a cult classic.

The film won Nine Gujarat State Film Awards, including Best Film, Best Director, Best Actor, Best Actress, Best Story, Best Music Director, Best Lyrics, Best Editor and Best Comedian (Male).

== Remakes and sequel ==
Sooraj R.Barjatya (Rajshree Productions) bought the "remake rights" from Jashwant Gangani to make the film in Bengali (Shubhodrishti). and Oriya (Sasu Ghara Chalijibi) languages and subsequently made the film in both languages and was released in regional cinema.

Its sequel Maiyar Ma Mandu Nathi Lagtu Part-II was released in 2008.

== See also ==
- List of Gujarati films
- Gujarati cinema
