= Satish Davara =

Indian filmmaker (born 1980)

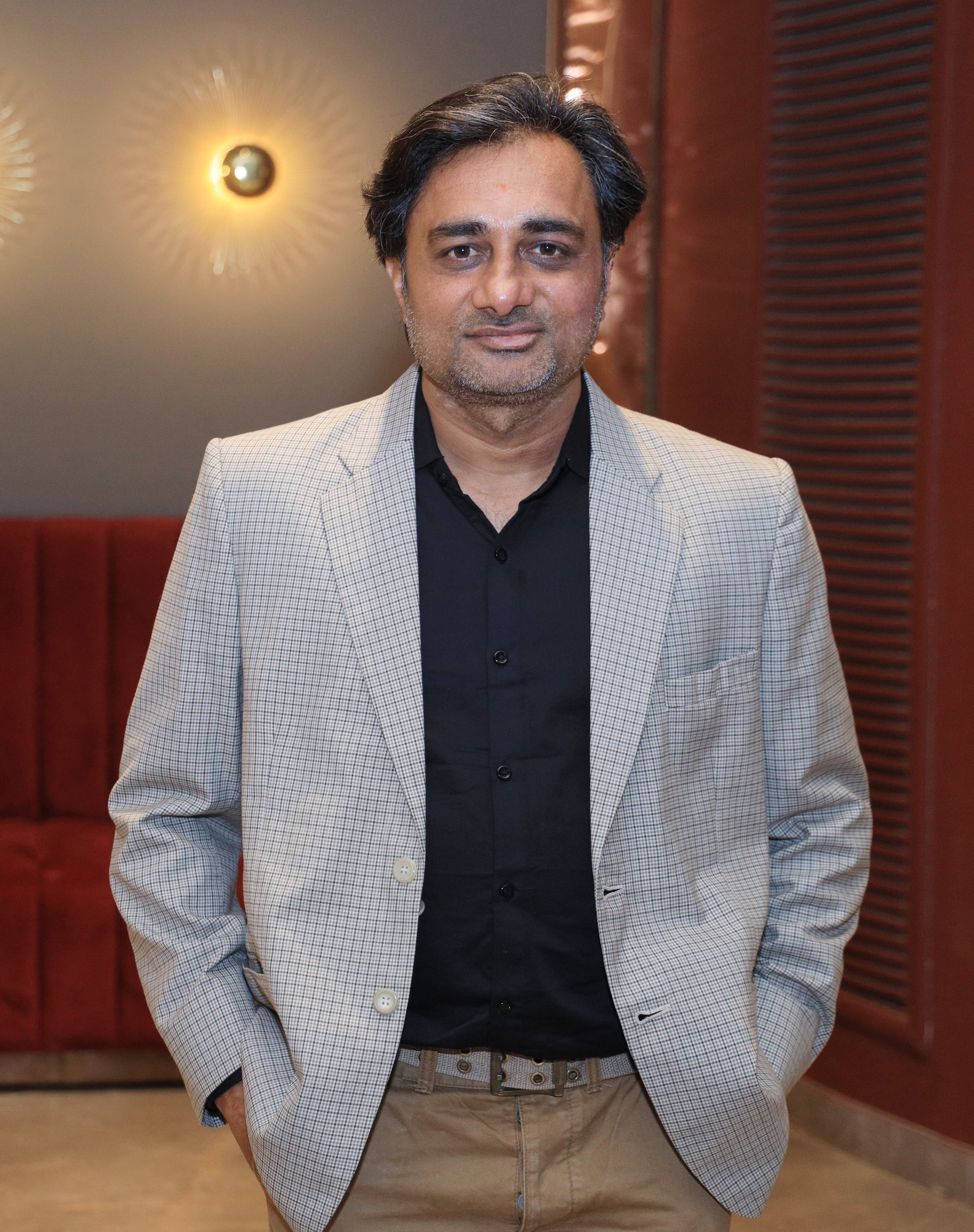
- Occupations: Film director; screenwriter; film producer
- Years active: 2005–present

Satish Davara is an Indian filmmaker and writer.

== Early life ==
Davara was born on 5 May 1980 in Surat, Gujarat. He earned a Bachelor of Commerce degree from Gujarat University. While studying at Shree Swaminarayan Gurukul Vishwavidya Pratishthanam (SGVP), he took part in school stage productions as a writer, actor, and director.

== Career ==
In 2021 Davara directed the feature film Divaswapna. The film garnered 53 awards and 35 nominations worldwide. His second feature, Bham, was released in 2023. He is also the author of the dark fantasy science fiction novel The Mosquito Man.

== Filmography ==
List of Satish Davara film credits
Year	Title	Director	Writer	Producer	Notes	Producers
2021	Divaswapna	Yes	Yes	No	Co-written screenplay with Naresh D Prajapati, Jayesh K. Patel, Sanjay Prajapati	K.D. Films
2023	Bham	Yes	No	No		Maruti Enterprise

== Bibliography ==
List of Satish Davara Novels and Book credits
Year	Title	Series	Credit	Publisher	Notes	Ref(s)
2025	The Swarm Rises	The Mosquito Man (Trilogy)	Created by And; Written by	Phantastic Publishing		
2025	Blood Future	The Mosquito Man (Trilogy)	Created by And; Written by	Phantastic Publishing		
2026	Blood Apocalypse	The Mosquito Man (Trilogy)	Created by And; Written by	Phantastic Publishing		
2026	Survive Like A Cockroach		Created by And; Written by	Phantastic Publishing		

== Accolades ==
Davara was nominated in the Best Director category at the Anatolia International Film Festival, Istanbul, Turkey, for Divaswapna in 2021. Davara also won the State Film Awards for the Best Popular Film of the Year and secured the 2nd rank in the Best Feature Film category in the State Film Awards by the Gujarat Government.

=== Gujarat State Awards 2024 ===
Year	Films	Category	Result
2024	Divaswapna (As director)	Best Popular Film of the Year	Won
2024	Divaswapna (As director)	Second Best Feature Film	Won
