= Dhuandhaar =

- Directed by: Rehan Chaudhary
- Written by: Rehan Chaudhary
- Produced by: Jeegar Chauhan; Rajesh Thakkar
- Starring: Malhar Thakar; Netri Trivedi; Alisha Prajapati; Dimple Biscuitwala; Hiten Kumar
- Cinematography: Jaymin Modi; Het Rahul Patel
- Edited by: Jaymin Modi
- Music by: Kedar - Bhargav
- Production company: Rehan Chaudhary Films
- Distributed by: Rupam Entertainment Pvt Ltd
- Release date: 17 September 2021
- Running time: 120 mins
- Country: India
- Language: Gujarati

Dhuandhaar (Gujarati: ધુઆંધાર) is a 2021 Gujarati thriller film starring Malhar Thakar, Netri Trivedi, Alisha Prajapati, Dimple Biscuitwala and Hiten Kumar. The film is written and directed by Rehan Chaudhary. and produced by Jeegar Chauhan and Rajesh Thakkar.

== Cast ==
- Malhar Thakar
- Netri Trivedi
- Alisha Prajapati
- Dimple Biscuitwala
- Hiten Kumar

== Soundtrack ==
Dhuandhaar

Studio album by Kedar - Bhargav
- Released: 17 September 2021
- Genre: Feature film soundtrack
- Label: Jeegar Chauhan Productions

The songs of the film are composed by Kedar - Bhargav. Lyrics are penned by Bhargav Purohit.

Tracklist
No.	Title	Lyrics	Singer(s)	Length
1.	"Dhuandhaar"	Bhargav Purohit	Anand Bhaskar	04:25
2.	"Paane Paane"	Bhargav Purohit	Jigardan Gadhavi	03:53

== Release ==
The film was released on 17 September 2021.

== Reception ==
Yesha Bhatt, writing for Times of India, praised the film for its "deviation from the usual romcoms" that the industry has been making. She noted that the film "get slightly slow" after interval "but it delivers an absolute punch in the gut at the climax". She praised the cinematography, but criticized the screenplay and characterization. Mantavya News rated it 3 out of 5 stars and praised the film screenplay and music, in particular.
