= Rasiya Tari Radha Rokani Rann Ma =

2014 Gujarati film

- Directed by: Hussian Bloch
- Produced by: Mitesh Patel
- Starring: Vikram Thakor; Mamata Soni; Yamini Joshi; Vasim Bloch; Marjina Diwan
- Release date: 20 June 2014
- Country: India
- Language: Gujarati

Rasiya Tari Radha Rokani Rann Ma is a 2014 Gujarati film, starring Vikram Thakor and Mamta Soni, directed by Hussian Bloch and produced by Mitesh Patel. Vasim Bloch played the antagonist in the film, while Marjina Diwan acted in supporting role.

== Plot ==
The story revolves around a young man who grew up in the deserts of Kutch and a young girl from a foreign land and how their love story further develops.

== Cast ==
- Vikram Thakor
- Mamata Soni
- Yamini Joshi
- Vasim Bloch
- Marjina Diwan

== Production and release ==
The film was initially titled Rann but it was later changed to Rasiya Tari Radha Rokani Rann Ma. The film was shot at the different location in Kutch including at the Great Rann of Kutch. It was released on 20 June 2014, and became successful.

== Music ==
The film features six songs composed by Manoj-Vimal duos including "Mara Manada Ni Meet", "Preet Kare Pukar", "Rasiya Tari Radha", "Maya Te Lagadi Sajan" and "Bhale Re Padharya".

== Reception ==
Mamta Soni was nominated for the Transmedia Awards in the Best Actress category.
