= Roma Manek =

Gujarati actress

- Born: Roma; 10 March; Gujarat, India

Roma Manek is a Gujarati actress. She has worked in many Gujarati films as lead actress and as Madri (Pandu's second wife) in the television serial Mahabharat.

== Selected filmography ==
=== Hindi movies ===
- 7 Saal Baad (1987)
- Peecha Karro (1986)
- Chambal ka Badshah (1986) Leading role(heroine) with Danny
- Dil Hai Ke Manta Nahin (1991) ... Fisherwomen in Song "Galayat Sakli Sonyachi" (Special Appearance)
- Zindagi Ek Juaa (1992) .... Dancer in Shakti Dancing Group (Special Appearance)
- Junoon (1992) .... Dance partner in Song "O Mere Dilruba" (Special Appearance)
- Zamane Se Kya Darna (1994) .... Gauri, Tribal Woman
- Jeena Marna Tere Sang (1992)
- Henna (1990) ... Der na ho jaaye song.

=== Gujrati movies ===
- Desh Re Joya Dada Pardesh Joya
- Karvani Jod
- Unchi Medina Uncha Mol
- Man Saybani Mediye
- Daldu lagyu, Sayba na desh ma
- Kanto Bagyo Kale
- Sathiya Puravo Ho Raj
- Aatmane Vage Ruda Dhol
- Aanganiya Sajavo Raj
- Moti na chowk re Sapna ma ditha
- Pardesi Maniyaro
- Sheni Vijanand
- Raj-Ratan
- Chundi Odhado Ho Raj
- Baba Ramdev

=== Television series ===
- Mahabharat 1988 as Madri
- Jai Hanuman 1997 as Kaushalya
