= Vikram Thakor =

Indian actor, Singer and musician

- Born: Vikram Melaji Thakor; 1 April 1984 (age 42); Fatehpura,Gujarat, India
- Occupations: Actor, singer, musician
- Years active: 2006 - present
- Spouse: Taraben Thakor

Vikram Thakor is an Indian actor. He has acted in more than 40 Gujarati films chiefly focused on rural audience, including several commercially successful films.

== Personals ==
Vikram Thakor is a native of Fatehpura village near Gandhinagar in Gujarat. Thakor started singing and playing flute on stage aged ten with his father Melaji Thakor, a folk and kirtan singer. Initially reluctant to enter the film industry, he debuted in Ek Var Piyu Ne Malva Aavje (2006) which was a commercial hit. He starred in several Gujarati films chiefly targeted to rural audience. All eight of his initial films were successful at the box office.

Thakor's other successful films include Radha Tara Vina Gamtu Nathi (2007), Vaagi Kalje Katari Tara Premni (2010), Premi Zukya Nathi ne Zukshe Nahi (2011) and Rasiya Tari Radha Rokani Rann Ma (2014). His six films earned ₹3 crore (US$320,000) and in 2015 he was considered a superstar of Gujarati cinema in various media. He lives in Gandhinagar.

== Controversy ==
Thakor was accused of duping Gujarati film director, Paresh Patel, of ₹35 lakh (US$37,000) in 2011. Following a police investigation, no charges were brought and the matter was dismissed.

== Filmography ==
- Ek Var Piyu Ne Malva Aavje (2006)
- Amdavad Palanpur Vaya Kadi Kalol
- Prem Gori Taro Kem Kari Bhulay
- Main To Odhi Chundaldi Tara Namni
- Preet Janamo Janam Ni Bhulase Nahin
- Radha Tara Vina Mane Gamtu Nathi (2007)
- Bewafa Pardeshi (2007)
- Tane Parki Manu Ke Manu Potani
- Radha Chudlo Perje Mara Nam No
- Chundadi Odhi Tara Naam Ni
- Vaagi Kalje Katari Tara Prem Ni (2010)
- Piyu Tara Vina Mane Eklu Lage (2010)
- Premi Zukya Nathi ne Zukshe Nahi (2011)
- Aakha Jag Thi Niraali Mari Saajna
- Shakti - The Power
- Sukh Ma Dashama Dukh Ma Dashama
- Maa Baap Na Aashirvad (2014)
- Patan Thi Pakistan
- Ek Prem no Divano Ek Prem ni Divani (2014)
- Haiye Dashama Honthe Dashama
- Odhani (2014)
- Rasiya Tari Radha Rokani Rann Ma (2014)
- Kon Halave Limdi Ne Kon Zulave Pipli (2014)
- Deshni Koi Pan Sarhad Prem Ne Roki Shakti Nathi (2015)
- Avtar Dharine Aavu Chhu (2015)
- Sogand Chhe Ma Baap Na (2016)
- Duniya Jale To Jale (2016)
- Radha Rahishu Sadaye Sangathe (2016)
- Patel ni Patelai Ane Thakor Ni Khandani (2016)
- Rajwadi Chhaiye Ame Manbher Rahiye (2017)
- Jag Jite Nahi Ne Haiyu Hare Nahi (2017)
- Kem Re Bhulay Thakor No. 1 (2018)
- Prem Karine Ver Valyu (2018)
- Ek Radha Ek Meera (2018)
- Akha Jagthi Nirali Mari Sajna (2019)
- Kutumb (2019)
- Rakhewal (2019)
- Amar Prem (2021)
- Tari Yaadoma Jindagi Jawani (2021)
- Tu Adhuri Vartano Chhedo (2022)
- Kon Parka Kon Potana (2022)
- Khedut Ek Rakshak (2022)
- Popaat (2023)
- Jindagi Jivi Le (2023)
- Hal Bheru Gamde (2024)
- Sorry Sajna (2024)
- Bhai Ni Beni Ladki (2024)
- Bhola No Bhagwan (2025)
- Bhai Beej (2026)
