= Hiten Kumar =

Indian film actor of Gujarati cinema

Hiten Kumar, born Hiten Mehta, is an Indian actor in Gujarati cinema.

== Career ==
He started in the Gujarati film industry with a role in Unchi Medina Uncha Mol (1998). His 1998 film Desh Re Joya Dada Pardesh Joya was a commercial superhit. He acted in several Gujarati films in his long career. The film won 11 of the Gujarat State Film Awards of the year, Film Maiyar Ma Mandu Nathi Lagtu Lagtu in 2001

He hosted a crime show, Crime Time... Fight Against Crime, on VTV Gujarati in 2014–2015.

== Personal life ==
He lives in Mumbai and married Sonal in 1989.

== Filmography ==
- Desh Re Joya Dada Pardesh Joya (1998)
- Daldu Chorayu Dhire Dhire (2000), directed by Jiten Purohit
- Maiyar Ma Mandu Nathi Lagtu (2001)
- Me to Palavde Bandhi Preet (2005)
- Preet Jhuke Nahi Saath Chhute Nahi (2006)
- Ek Var Piyu Ne Malva Aavje (2006)
- Mota Ghar Ni Vahu (2007), written by Jiten Purohit
- Unchi Medina Uncha Mol
- Halo Manvyune Mele (2007)
- Mandavda Ropavo Manaraj
- Chundadi Odhado Ho Raj
- Panddu Leelu ne Rang Raato
- Dikro Maro Ladakvayo
- Chaar (2011)
- Preet Jhuke Nahi Saath Chhute Nahi (2011)
- Premi Zukya Nathi ne Zukshe Nahi (2011)
- Kon Halave Limdi Ne Kon Zulave Pipli (2014)
- Lohi No Nahi E Koi No Nahi (2014)
- Padkar.. The Challenge (2014)
- Dikri Ne Na Desho Koi Pardesh (2015)
- Taro Sur Mara Geet: Ek Sangeetmay Prem Katha (2015)
- Prem Rang (2016)
- Simran (2017)
- Hameer (2017)
- Chitkar (2018)
- Dhuandhaar (2021)
- Raado (2022)
- Vash (2023)
- Aagantuk (2023)
- Welcome Purnima (2023)
- Chupp (2024)
- Trisha On The Rocks (2024)
- The Great Gujarati Matrimony (2024)
- Taaro Thayo (2025)
- Mithada Maheman (2025)
- Vash Level 2 (2025)
- Ruff and Tuff Kanya (2026)
