= List of Gujarati films of 2019 =

This is a list of Gujarati language films that were released in 2019. Chaal Jeevi Laiye! became the highest-grossing Gujarati film of all time, earning ₹52.14 crore (US$5.4 million), before it was surpassed in 2026. The Gujarati films collectively grossed ₹62 crore (US$6.4 million) in 2019, according to Ormax Box Office Report.

== Box-office collection ==
Rank	Film	Director	Studio(s)	Gross	Source
1	Chaal Jeevi Laiye!	Vipul Mehta	Coconut Motion Pictures	₹52.14 crore (US$5.4 million)	
2	Hellaro	Abhishek Shah	Harfanmaula Films	₹16 crore (US$1.7 million)	
3	Chasani	Abhinn - Manthan	Shukul Showbiz, Sagar Productions	₹5 crore (US$520,000)	

== January–March ==
Opening	Name	Director	Cast	Source
11 January	Short Circuit	Faisal Hashmi	RJ Dhvanit, Kinjal Rajpriya, Smit Pandya	
18 January	Baap Re Baap	Sagar Kalaria	Rajeev Mehta, Tej Joshi, Pratik Rathod, Tilana Desai, Bhargav Thaker	
18 January	Have Thase Baap Re	Nirav Barot	Kiran Kumar, Raunaq Kamdar, Mamta Chaudhari	
18 January	Yaar Aavu To Thayaj Kare	Akash Nayak	Sanjay Singh Chauhan, Karan Rajveer	
25 January	Daddy I Love You	Darshan Joshi	Ronak Bhalodi, Shreyanshi Barot, Riya Gor	
1 February	Chaal Jeevi Laiye!	Vipul Mehta	Siddharth Randeria, Yash Soni, Aarohi Patel, Bhavik Bhojak	
1 February	Order Order Out of Order	Dhwani Gautam	Raunaq Kamdar, Jinal Belani, Gaurav Paswala, Anang Desai, Hemang Dave, Prem Gadhavi, Ojas Rawal, Manan Desai	
8 February	I v/s Me	Prit Goswami	Prit Goswami, Mausami Shailesh, Nimesh Patel	
8 February	Saheb	Shailesh Prajapati	Malhar Thakar, Kinjal Rajpriya, Nisarg Trivedi, Archan Trivedi	
15 February	Lapet	Nishith Brahmbhatt	Bhakti Kubavat, Ketan Kumar Sagar, Vikee Shah & Nayan Shukla	
22 February	My Dear Babuchak	Dushyant Patel	Ravi Omprakash Rao, Arti Bhavsar, Jitu Pandya	
22 February	Nakkama	Avinash Gaurav	Prapti Ajwalia, Swati Dave, Tushar Dave, Akhil Kotak, Rohan Sinha, Ramakanth Ingale	
1 March	Tu Chhe Ne	Rehan Chaudhary	Shyam Nair, Dimple Biscuitwala, Kartik Rastrapal	
8 March	Fakebook Dhamaal	Manoj Patel	Soham Shah, Rutwa Patel, Kartik Rastrapal, Nishit Brahmbhatt	

== April–June ==
Opening	Name	Director	Cast	Source
12 April	Kachindo	Urvish Parikh, Abdul Wahid Siddique	Raj Jatania, Bhawini Gandhi, Krupa Mishra, Mohsin Shaikh, Greeva Kansara	
03 May	Bau Na Vichar	Hrutul	Janki Bodiwala, Bhavya Gandhi, Devarshi Shah, Ragi Jani, Sanjay Galsar, Bhushan Bhatt, Navjot Chauhan	
10 May	Jalsaghar	Atul Patel	Hiten Kumar, Jeetendra Thakkar, Yamini Joshi, Nikhil Parmar	

== July–September ==
Opening	Name	Director	Cast	Source
4 July	Saahil - Zindagi Ni Shodh Ma	Saurabh Bhatt	Prem Chopra, Rajan Rathod, Viveka Patel	
5 July	Babukaka Ni Cha	Karan Rajput	Kalpesh Rajgor, Harshik Rajput, Kartik Rashtrapal, Dinesh Lamba	
12 July	Jigar Jaan	Bapodra	Naresh Kanodia, Rakesh Barot, Yesha Gandhi, Aarti Soni	
19 July	Chasani	Abhinn - Manthan	Manoj Joshi, Divyang Thakkar, Sejal Shah, Maira Doshi, Ojas Rawal	
26 July	47 Dhansukh Bhawan	Naiteek Raval	Gaurav Paswala, Rishi Vyas, Shyam Nair, Jay Bhatt, Hemang Vyas	
26 July	Dhunki	Anish Shah	Pratik Gandhi, Deeksha Joshi, Vishal Shah, Kaushambi Bhatt	
2 August	Vijay Path	Jayesh Trivedi	Pratish Vora, Dilip Darbar, Haresh Dagiya, Chetan Daiya	
16 August	Kutumb	Bapodra	Vikram Thakor, Akash Shah, Prinal Oberoi	
23 August	Montu Ni Bittu	Vijaygiri Bava	Aarohi Patel, Maulik Nayak, Hemang Shah, Mehul Solanki, Kaushambi Bhatt	
6 September	Cheel Zadap	Dharmessh Mehta	Darshan Jariwala, Soniya Shah, Jimit Trivedi, Sushant Singh	
13 September	Bajaaba - The Daughter	Ramesh Karolkar	Neelam Patel, Dhara Janak, Chetan Daiya, Neel Soni	
13 September	Hungama House	Hanif Chhipa	Chetan Daiya, Chini Raval, Hemant Jha, Jignesh Modi	
13 September	Teacher of the Year	Vikram Panchal & Shounak Vyas	Shounak Vyas, Alisha Prajapati, Ragi Jani, Nisarg Trivedi, Jash Thakkar, Yuvraj Gadhvi, Ankit Gajera, Archan Trivedi & Mehul Buch	

== October–December ==
Opening	Name	Director	Cast	Source
11 October	Bijjo Divas	Lucky Anand	Yesh Dravid, Nirmit Bhatt, Rutesh Patel, Piyush Patel, Om Bhatt, Payal Nayak, Shachi Joshi, Ayushi Raghuvanshi, Zeenat Shaikh	
11 October	I Love My India	Rohitraj Singh Rathod	Mahesh Singh, Mithun Trivedi, Rohitraj Singh Rathod	
18 October	Raghu CNG	Vishal Vada Vala	Ethan Wade, Jagjeetsinh Vadher, Sharvary Joshi, Chetan Daiya, Kapil Sahetya, Siddharth Gosai, Ruby Salunke	
25 October	Rakhewal	Harsukh Patel	Vikram Thakor, Mamta Soni and Jitu Pandya	
8 November	Hellaro	Abhishek Shah	Jayesh More, Shraddha Dangar, Brinda Trivedi Nayak, Shachi Joshi, Niilam Paanchal, Tejal Panchasara, Kaushambi Bhatt	
15 November	Mister Kalaakar	Firoz Irani	Akshat Irani, Pooja Jhaveri, Manoj Joshi, Adi Irani, Manali Sevak, Firoz Irani, Ragi Jani, Bhavini Jani,	
22 November	Tari Muskurahat	Hiren Jadvani	Suraj Kumar, Toral Sharma	
22 November	Vishuddhi	Arpan Patel	Deepak suthar, Hetvi Parmar	
29 November	Diya – The Wonder Girl	Suresh Premvati Bishnoi	Diya Patel, Diveyaa Dwivedi	
29 November	Gujarat 11	Jayant Gilatar	Pratik Gandhi, Daisy Shah, Kavin Dave	
6 December	24 Carat Pittal	Yogesh Patel	Bhakti Kubavat, Vikee Shah, Jolly Rathod, Vipul Vithlani, Rishi Panchal and Hitesh Raval, Kamini Patel, Dr Luvv Mehta, Jay Pandya, Neel Soni and Khushboo Shah	
13 December	Veer Mangdavalo	Yash Shreedatt Vyas	Komal Thakkar, Saurabh Rajyaguru, Bharat Thakkar, Jayendra Mehta, Morli Patel	

== See also ==
- List of Gujarati films
- List of highest-grossing Gujarati films
