= List of Gujarati films of 2023 =

List of Gujarati language films released in 2023

This is a list of Gujarati language films that were released in 2023. The Gujarati films collectively grossed ₹50 crore (US$5.2 million) in 2023, according to Ormax Box Office Report.

== Box-office collection ==
Rank	Film	Director	Studio(s)	Gross	Source
1	3 Ekka	Rajesh Sharma	Anand Pandit Motion Pictures	est. ₹26.11 crore (US$2.7 million)	
2	Bushirt T-shirt	Ishaan Randeria	Coconut Motion Pictures	est. ₹8.72 crore (US$910,000)	

== January–March ==
Opening	Name	Genre	Director	Cast	Ref.
6 January	Kutch Express	Drama	Viral Shah	Ratna Pathak Shah, Manasi Parekh, Darsheel Safary	
6 January	Lakiro	Romance	Darshan Ashwin Trivedi	Raunaq Kamdar, Deeksha Joshi, Netri Trivedi, Deepak Antani	
13 January	My Best Friend Daadu	Drama	Jashwant Gangani	Prashant Barot, Vishal Thakkar, Jitendra Thakkar, Aditi Desai, Umang Acharya	
13 January	Mari Hambhad Lenari Jati Rahi	Action	Hitesh Poonam Beldar	Jignesh Barot, Neha Suthar	
20 January	Hu - Atra Tatra Sarvatra	Drama	Irshad Dalal	Hitu Kanodia, Jitendra Thakkar, Jignesh Modi, Mandeep Singh Basran, Rohan Patel, Shriya Tiwari	
3 February	Congratulations	Drama	Rehan Chaudhary	Sharman Joshi, Manasi Parekh	
3 February	Hun Iqbal	Suspense Thriller	Pallav Parikh	Mitra Gadhavi, Devaki, Sonali Lele Desai, Nirav Vaidya, Ravi Ranjan	
10 February	Karma	Thriller	Subbu Iyer	Chetan Dhanani, Brinda Trivedi, Anshul Trivedi	
10 February	Saptrang	Drama	K K Makwana	Jayesh More, Jahnvi Chauhan, Prem Gadhvi	
10 February	Vash	Thriller	Krishnadev Yagnik	Janki Bodiwala, Hitu Kanodia, Niilam Paanchal, Hiten Kumar	
17 February	Aagantuk	Thriller	Naitik Raval	Hiten Kumar, Netri Trivedi, Utsav Naik	
24 February	Chal Man Jeetva Jaiye 2	Family drama	Dipesh Shah	Harsh Khurana, Rajeev Mehta, Hemen Chauhan, Sheetal Pandya, Dharmendra Gohil	
24 February	Jyoti	Drama	Raj Irani	Neha Joshi	
3 March	Hello	Thriller	Neeraj Joshi	Darshan Pandya, Jayesh More, Mazel Vyas, Neel Gagdani, Rishabh Joshi, Aayushi Dholakia, Nidhi Seth	
3 March	Gujarat Thi Goa	Action drama	Rajdeep	Akshatt Irani, Shekhar Shukla, Shakti Kapoor	
10 March	Land Grabbing	Drama	Harish Baria	Chetan Daiya, Zeel Joshi, Bimal Trivedi	
17 March	Sachu Kahu Tu Mane Bahu Game Che	Action, Romance	Keshav Rathod	Kamlesh Chattraliya, Krishna Zala	
24 March	Nava Pappa	Comedy	Ashok Patel Samrat	Manoj Joshi, Vandana Pathak, Kinjal Rajpriya, Muni Jha, Parth Oza, Sunil Vishrani	
31 March	Watan Maru Kathiawad	Drama	Kanti Prajapati	Moni Patel, Pooja Prajapati, Jayendra Mehta, Paresh Bhatt	

== April–June ==
Opening	Name	Genre	Director	Cast	Ref.
7 April	21 Divas	Drama	Kush Banker	Maulik Nayak, Aarjav Trivedi, Pooja Jhaveri, Prem Gadhavi	
14 April	Prem Anubandh	Romantic drama	Urvish Parikh	Krutika Desai, Kalpesh Rajgor, Prakash Gadhvi, Jayendra Mehta, Morli Patel	
14 April	Bham	Comedy, Drama	Satish Davara	Sanjay Prajapati, Priyal Bhatt, Akash Maheriya, Chaitanya Chaudhary, Vivek Ghamande, Grancy Kaneria, Jignesh Modi	
28 April	Shubh Yatra	Comedy	Manish Saini	Malhar Thakar, Monal Gajjar, Darshan Jariwala, Hitu Kanodia, Archan Trivedi, Hemin Trivedi, Magan Luhar, Sunil Visrani, Jay Bhatt, Chetan Daiya	
28 April	Anokhee	Romance drama	Rakesh Shah	Arjav Trivedi, Bhumika Barot, Nakshraj	
5 May	Bushirt T-shirt	Comedy drama	Ishaan Randeria	Siddharth Randeria, Kamlesh Ozza, Vandana Pathak, Reeva Rachh	
12 May	Rudan	Suspense	Akhil Kotak	Akhil Kotak, Chetan Daiya, Bhavini Jani, Jitendra Thakkar	
12 May	Welcome Purnima	Horror Comedy	Rishil Joshi	Hiten Kumar, Manasi Rachh, Binda Rawal, Hem Sevak, Janvi Gurnami	
19 May	Welcome Zindagi	Family Drama	Bhavesh Gorasiya, Irshad Dalal	Anang Desai, Umang Acharya, Prashant Barot, Sunil Vishrani	
26 May	Jaishree Krishh	Drama	Hardeik Rathor	Devarshi Shah, Simran Natekar, Rajan Thakar, Prashant Barot, Chetan Daiya, Ragi Jani, Morli Patel	
26 May	Ulta Pulta	Comedy	Viral Patel	Hitu Kanodia, Shekhar Shukla	
2 June	I Wish	Drama	Amit Vikas Patel	Teeshay Shah, Monal Gajjar, Aarjav Trivedi	
9 June	Char Fera Nu Chakdol	Comedy	Nishithkumar Brahmbhatt	Sanjay Goradia, Smit Pandya, Disha Savla Upadhyay, Bhavwini Gandhi, Jitendra Thakkar, Vishal Thakkar	
9 June	Fuleku	Comedy drama	Irshad Dalal	Anang Desai, Jignesh Modi, Manjari Mishra, Amit Das	
9 June	Love Chumbak	Drama	Dhruv Bhatiya	Archan Trivedi, Chetan Daiya, Ragi Jani	
11 June	Gulaam Chor	Comedy Suspense	Viral Shah	Malhar Thakar, Dharmesh Vyas, Vandana Pathak	

== July–September ==
Opening	Name	Genre	Director	Cast	Ref.
7 July	Var Padharavo Saavdhan	Drama	Vipul Sharma	Tushar Sadhu, Kinjal Rajpriya	
7 July	Mastini Pathshala	Comedy drama	Sunil Vaghela	Shreya Dave, Jay Pandya, Dipika Raval, Anshuman Joshi	
14 July	Terrace	Drama	Prashant Kumar Singh	Vijay Kabra, Nidhi Dave, Vishvam Shukla	
21 July	Bachubhai	Comedy - Drama	Rahul Bhole and Vinit Kanojia	Siddharth Randeria, Apara Mehta, Amit Singh Thakur, Naman Gor	
22 July	Chandlo	Drama	Hardik Gajjar	Manav Gohil, Shraddha Dangar, Kaajal Oza Vaidya, Jayesh More	
28 July	Mast Naukri Sarkari	Comedy drama	Milan Devmani	Anand Devmani, Jakir Khan, Dipika Raval, Bhavesh Shrimali	
28 July	Laya Baki	Comedy	Hirav Trivedi	Danesh Gandhi, Madhavi Patel, Feroz Bhagat, Anurag Prapann, Ragi Jani, Anshu Joshi, Kalpesh Patel, Jay Pandya	
4 August	Sasu Maa	Family drama	Manav Sakariya	Sonali Lele Desai, Kailash Shahadadpuri, Muni Jha, Niti Sakariya	
25 August	3 Ekka	Comedy	Rajesh Sharma	Malhar Thakar, Yash Soni, Mitra Gadhavi, Kinjal Rajpriya, Esha Kansara, Tarjanee Bhadla	
25 August	Prityu Na Mul	Family Drama	Panjakj Nimavat	Mehul Bhojak. Arzu Limbachiya, Sunny Khatri, Mitesh Varma, Jignesh Modi	
15 September	Hu ane Tu	Comedy drama	Manan Sagar	Siddharth Randeria, Sonaalee Lele Desai, Puja Joshi, Parikshit Tamaliya	
22 September	Kahi De Ne Prem Chhe	Drama	Rajesh Thakkar	Vishal Solanki, Smit Pandya, Kalpesh Patel, Mukesh Rao	
29 September	Nikki	Sports drama	Roopang Acharya	Samvedna Suwalka, Aahana Thakur, Khushi Thakkar, Navjot Singh Chauhan, Sonali Lele Desai, Kamal Joshi, Munjal Vyas, Sunil Vaghela, Shivam Markanday	
29 September	Hu Chhu Mr. Shankar	Drama	Rafik Talukdar	Dharmesh Vyas, Prashant Barot, Mehul Bhojak, Jasmin Patel, Komal Thacker	

== October–December ==
Opening	Name	Genre	Director	Cast	Ref.
13 October	Bakhad Jantar	Comedy	Jayesh Trivedi	Kaushal Shah, Kartik Rastrapal, Nitya Makadiya, Sharad Sharma	
27 October	Meera	Drama	Dilip Dixit	Heena Varde, Sanjay Parmar, Maulik Chauhan, Chetan Daiya, Reeva Rachh	
27 October	Gandhi & Co.	Children drama	Manish Saini	Reyaan Shah, Hiranya Zinzuwadia, Darshan Jariwala, Jayesh More, Dhruma Mehta, Dhyani Jani	
2 November	Popaat	Drama	Bhavin Trivedi	Ragi Jani, Bhumika Barot, Prenal Oberoi, Gopi Desai, Vivek Ghamande, Smit Pandya, Aakash Zala	
3 November	Rocky in Risk 2	Romantic comedy action	Alok Thaker, Nivedita Shah	Alok Thaker, Nivedita Shah, Feanisha Vankar	
12 November	Jindagi Jivi Le	Romance	Harsukh Patel	Vikram Thakor, Sweta Sen, Sunny Khatri, Jitu Pandya, Jayendra Mehta	
24 November	Sarpanch	Action thriller	Apurv Bajpai	Karan Rajveer, Nirali Oza, Ragi Jani, Chetan Daiya, Aakash Zala, Smit Joshi, Kapil Goswami	
8 December	Hurry Om Hurry	Comedy drama	Nisarg Vaidya	Siddharth Randeria, Raunaq Kamdar, Vyoma Nandi	
8 December	Patkatha	Suspence drama	Akhil Kotak	Akhil Kotak, Bhavini Jani, Nishith Brahmbhatt, Arvind Vegda	
15 December	Kanubhai The Great	Drama	Irshad Dalal	Nikunj Modi, Rajiv Panchal, Ojas Rawal, Vanraj Sisodiya	

== See also ==
- Gujarati cinema
- List of Gujarati films
- List of Gujarati films of 2024
- List of highest-grossing Gujarati films
