= Bhagirath Bhatt =

Indian musician

- Born: Bhagirtahkumar Pankajbhai Bhatt; 31 May 1991 (age 35); Jamnagar, Gujarat, India
- Genres: Classical, Folk, Fusion, Film music, Ghazal
- Occupations: Sitarist, composer, musician
- Instrument: Sitar
- Years active: 2010–present
- Labels: Saregama, T-Series, Sony Music India Bhansali Music

Bhagirath Bhatt (Gujarati pronunciation: [ભગીરથ ભટ્ટ]; born Bhagirtahkumar Pankajbhai Bhatt, 31 May 1991) is an Indian sitar player, classical musician, and composer. Active in the music industry for over a decade, he has contributed to numerous projects across Bollywood, South Indian cinema, Marathi cinema, and Gujarati cinema.

== Early life and education ==
Bhagirath Bhatt was born in Jamnagar, Gujarat, India. He completed his schooling at Shree Satya Sai Vidyalay, Jamnagar, and pursued his higher education at Maharaja Sayajirao University of Baroda. He is gold medalist from Maharaja Sayajirao University of Baroda, specialisation in Sitar. Bhatt trained under renowned gurus, including Shree Chetan Shastri, Ustad Abdul Halim Jaffer Khan, Ustad Shahid Parvez, and Ustad Asad Khan. His musical journey was deeply influenced by his father, Pankajkumar Dineshchandra Bhatt, who has been serving as a singer and tabla player in Ramkatha events led by Pujya Morari Bapu for over 45 years.

== Career ==
Bhagirath Bhatt gained recognition in the Bollywood industry with his contribution to the film Padmaavat. He has since worked on projects such as Indian Idol, the ghazal album Sukoon by Sanjay Leela Bhansali, period drama television series Heeramandi, the musical web series Bandish Bandits and Kartik Aaryan's Bhool Bhulaiyaa 3 and many others. Bhatt has collaborated with several eminent music directors and artists, including Pandit Birju Maharaj, A.R. Rahman, Shankar-Ehsaan-Loy, Arijit Singh, Sonu Nigam, Ajay-Atul. Bhatt has also contributed to the development of platforms for aspiring sitar players, enabling them to earn through fusion and contemporary performances. He is known for his spiritual music contributions, having performed sitar for Ram Katha, Bhagvat Katha, and Shiv Mahapuran for over a decade.

== Filmography ==
=== Hollywood ===
Title	Year	Notes
Avatar: The Last Airbender	2024	Starring James Patrick Stuart
The American Gandhi	2014	Created by Michael Dante DiMartino

=== Bollywood ===
Title	Year	Notes
Padmavat	2018	Directed by Sanjay Leela Bhansali
Malaal	2019	Directed by Mangesh Hadawale
Hum Do Humare Do	2021	Starring Rajkumar Rao
Ek Villain Returns	2022	Starring Arjun Kapoor and Tara Sutaria
Mission Raniganj	2023	Starring Akshay Kumar
Hasal	Not Known	Starring Raghav Juyal
Safed	2023	Starring Abhay Verma
Sameer	2017	Starring Mohammed Zeeshan Ayyub
Tera Kya Hoga Lovely	2022	Starring Randeep Hooda
Nishanchi	2025	Monika Panwar, Aaishvary Thackeray, Vedika Pinto
Bhagwat	2025	Arshad Warsi, Jitendra Kumar, Ayesha Kaduskar
Gustakh Ishq	2022	Banasri Ghoshal
Border 2	2026	Sunny Deol, Varun Dhawan, Diljit Dosanjh
Loveyapa	2025	Starring Khushi Kapoor
Qala	2022	Starring Babil Khan and Triptii Dimri
Bhool Bhulaiyaa 3	2024	Starring Kartik Aaryan and Triptii Dimri

=== Famous album songs ===
- Bhoomi 2025 (Pehale Kyun Naa Mile & Tum Jo Kaho)
- Coke Studio Bharat (Meetha Khaara)
- Ganesh Utsav on Zee5

==== Web Series ====
Title	Year	Notes	OTT Platform
Heera Mandi	2024	Directed by Sanjay Leela Bhansali	Netflix
Kota Factory 2	2019	Starring Jitendra Kumar	Netflix
Gullak	2019	Starring Vaibhav Raj Gupta	Sony Liv
Bandish Bandits	2020	Music by Shankar–Ehsaan–Loy	Amazon Prime
Cubicle	2019	Directed by Chaitanya Kumbhakonum	Sony Liv
Anupama	2020	Starring Rupali Ganguly	Disney+ Hotstar
Jubilee	2023	Starring Aparshakti Khurana	Amazon Prime

=== TV Shows ===
==== Daily Soap ====
Title	Year	TV Channel
Anupama	2020	Star Plus
Yeh Rishta Kya Kehlata Hai	Not Known	Star Plus
Pavitra Rishta	Not Known	Zee TV

==== Reality Shows ====
Title	Year	Notes	TV Channel
Indian Idol	2019	More than 50 episodes after session 11	Sony TV
Saregamapa	Not Known	–	Zee TV
Superstar Singer	2019	Hosted by Himesh Reshamiya	Sony TV
Kaun Banega Crorepati	–	Hosted by Amitabh Bachchan	Sony TV
MTV Unplugged	Not Known	–	MTV
Naam Reh Jayega	2022	With Arijit Singh Tribute to Lata Mangeshkar Ji on Hotstar	MTV

=== Gujarati films ===
Title	Year	Notes
Hellaro	2019	Directed by Abhishek Shah
Kasoombo	2024	Directed by Vijaygiri Bava
Naadi Dosh	2022	Directed by Krishnadev Yagnik
Kehvatlal Parivar	2022	Directed by Vipul Mehta
Vanilla Ice Cream	2024	Starring Malhar Thakar
Fakt Purusho Maate	2024	Starring Amitabh Bachchan and Darshan Jariwala
Saiyar Mori Re	2022	Directed by Vishal Vada Vala
Udan Chhoo	2024	Starring Aarohi Patel & Deven Bhojani
Luv Ni Love Storys	2020	Starring Pratik Gandhi
Bachu Ni Benpani	2025	Shah Devarshi, Siddharth Randeria, Yukti Randeria
Laalo	2025	Karan Joshi, Reeva Rachh, Shruhad Goswami
Aavaa De	2025	Parikshit Tamaliya, Kumpal Patel, Hemant Kher
Umbarro	2025	Starring Deeksha Joshi

=== Marathi films ===
Title	Year	Notes
Gadad Andhar	2023	Starring Neha Mahajan & Jay Dudhane
Maharashtra Shahir	2023	Directed by Kedar Shinde
Sangeet Manapmaan	2025	Directed by Subodh Bhave

=== South films ===
Title	Year	Notes
Paris Paris	2017	Starring Kajal Aggarwal

== See also ==
- Indian Classical Music
- Sitar
- Bollywood Music
