= Coconut Motion Pictures =

Indian film company

- Industry: film production, distribution and marketing
- Founder: Rashmin Majithia
- Headquarters: Mumbai, India
- Parent: Coconut Media Box LLP
- Website: cmp.coconutmediabox.com

Coconut Motion Pictures is an Indian film production, distribution and marketing company established by Rashmin Majithia.

The company has ventures in the exhibition sector, having eight cinema properties in Gujarat.

== History ==
The company has produced a regional full length feature film: Hameer, a bilingual starring Ravi Kishan, Yashpal Sharma, Komal Thacker and Hiten Kumar in lead roles, which was released on 13 January 2017. The company has also co-produced a romantic, thriller, comedy film Ranchi Diaries Directed by Sattwik Mohanty starring Anupam Kher, Jimmy Shergill, Satish Kaushik, Himansh Kohli, Soundarya Sharma, Taaha Shah, Hariharsudhan Balasubramani and Pradeep Singh, which was released 13 October 2017. The company has produced a Gujarati feature film Best Of Luck Laalu directed by Vipul Mehta starring Supriya Pathak, Muni Jha, Smit Ganatra, Simran Natekar, Rishabh Joshi & Kurush Deboo.

Coconut Motion Pictures has significantly impacted regional cinema with its diverse film offerings. The Gujarati comedy film Midnights with Menka, directed by Viral Shah, stars Malhar Thakar, Esha Kansara, Hardik Sangani, Vinita Mahesh, Parth Oza, and Ragi Jani. Their highest-grossing Gujarati film, Chaal Jeevi Laiye, was released on 1 February 2019, directed by Vipul Mehta, and features Siddharth Randeria, Yash Soni, and Aarohi Patel, with a remarkable run of over 2000 days in theaters. Another notable film, Kehvatlal Parivar, also written and directed by Vipul Mehta, stars Siddharth Randeria, Supriya Pathak Kapur, Vandana Pathak, Sanjay Goradia, Bhavya Gandhi, and Shraddha Dangar. Nava Pappa, a Gujarati comedy directed by Ashok Patel, was released on March 24, 2023, featuring Manoj Joshi, Vandana Pathak, Kinjal Rajpriya, Parth Oza, Sunil Vishrani, Muni Jha, and Dilip Darbar. Bushirt T-shirt, written and directed by Ishaan Randeria, stars Siddharth Randeria, Kamlesh Oza, Vandana Pathak, Reeva Rachh, Hardik Sangani, Kuldeep Gor, Manan Desai, Bhakti Kubavat, Dilip Rawal, Muni Jha, and Sunil Vishrani.

Additionally, Ole Aale, a Marathi-language comedy-drama and remake of Chaal Jeevi Laiye, was released on January 5, 2024, directed by Vipul Mehta and produced under the banner of Coconut Motion Pictures. It features Nana Patekar, Siddharth Chandekar, Sayali Sanjeev, Makarand Anaspure, and Tanvi Azmi, with a soundtrack composed by Sachin-Jigar. The film completed 25 weeks in cinemas.

Their 2025 release, Bachu Ni Benpani, is a super-hit Gujarati film featuring the legendary Siddharth Randeria, acclaimed actress Ratna Pathak Shah, young Devarshi Shah and stunning Yutki Randeria. The film, written and directed by [Vipul Mehta (director)|Vipul Mehta], was released on 27 August 2025 and had a blockbuster theatrical for over 50 days.

The 2026 release, Lagan Laagii Re featured Malhar Thakar, Aarohi Patel, Tatsat Munshi and an ensemble cast. Written and directed by Saandeep Patel, the film was released worldwide on February 6, 2026.

Coconut Movies acquired four titles from the T-series for overseas theatrical exploitation. These included: Raabta, starring Sushant Singh Rajput and Kriti Sanon, which was released on June 9, 2017. Baadshaho, starring Ajay Devgn, Emraan Hashmi, Ileana D'Cruz, Esha Gupta, Vidyut Jammwal, and Aishwarya Rai Bachchan, which was released on September 1, 2017. Simran, starring Kangana Ranaut, was released on September 15, 2017. Tumhari Sulu, starring Vidya Balan, was released on December 1, 2017.

Building on their presence in the Gujarati film industry, Coconut Movies released several titles in 2018, including 'Joothanu' directed by Chandradhar Rao Putta, 'Ek Radha Ek Meera' directed by Nilesh Indu Maruti Mohit featuring Vikram Thakor, and Midnights with Menka directed by Viral Shah. The company continued its Gujarati releases in 2019 with 'Baap Re Baap' directed by Sagar Kalaria, Chaal Jeevi Laiye directed by Vipul Mehta, 'Majja Ni Life' directed by Dinesh Patel & Vasant Goswami, 'Sakhi Maari Southi Waali' directed by Aakil Golawala, and 'Mister Kalakar' directed by Feroze Irani. They further expanded their portfolio with 'Kehvatlal Parivar' directed by Vipul Mehta in 2022, followed by Kutch Express directed by Viral Shah in 2023, and Bushirt T-shirt directed by Ishaan Randeria in 2023, showcasing their continued commitment to promoting regional cinema. After Gujarati, they entered the Marathi industry with the release of Ole Aale, a Marathi-language comedy-drama featuring the legendary Nana Patekar in the lead which is the remake of Chaal Jeevi Laiye.

== Films produced ==
Year	Film	Director	Producer(s)	Cast	Language	Notes
2017	Hameer	Ashok Patel	Rashmin Majithia	Ravi Kishan and Hiten Kumar	Gujarati	
2017	Ranchi Diaries	Sattwik Mohanty	Rashmin Majithia and Anupam Kher	Anupam Kher, Jimmy Shergill, Satish Kaushik, Himansh Kohli, Soundarya Sharma, Taaha Shah Badusha, Hariharsudhan Balasubramani & Pradeep Singh.	Hindi	Co-produced along with Anupam Kher's Actor Prepares
2017	Best Of Luck Laalu	Vipul Mehta	Rashmin Majithia	Supriya Pathak Kapur, Muni Dilip Jha, Smit Ganatra, Simran Natekar, Rishabh Joshi & Kurush Deboo	Gujarati	
2018	Midnights with Menka	Viral Shah (director)	Rashmin Majithia	Malhar Thakar, Esha Kansara, Hardik Sangani, Vinita Mahesh, Parth Oza and Ragi Jani	Gujarati	
2019	Chaal Jeevi Laiye!	Vipul Mehta	Rashmin Majithia	Siddharth Randeria, Yash Soni and Aarohi Patel	Gujarati	
2022	Kehvatlal Parivar	Vipul Mehta	Rashmin Majithia	Siddharth Randeria, Supriya Pathak Kapur, Vandana Pathak, Sanjay Goradia, Bhavya Gandhi and Shraddha Dangar	Gujarati	
2023	Nava Pappa	Ashok Patel	Rashmin Majithia	Manoj Joshi, Vandana Pathak, Parth Oza, Kinjal Rajpriya, Sunil Vishrani, Muni Jha and Dilip Darbar	Gujarati	
2023	Bushirt T-shirt	Ishaan Randeria	Rashmin Majithia	Siddharth Randeria, Kamlesh Oza, Vandana Pathak, Reeva Racch, Hardik Sangani, Kuldeep Gor, Manan Desai, Bhakti Kubavat, Dilip Rawal, Muni Jha and Sunil Vishrani	Gujarati	
2024	Ole Aale	Vipul Mehta	Rashmin Majithia	Nana Patekar, Siddharth Chandekar, Sayali Sanjeev, Makarand Anaspure and Tanvi Azmi	Marathi	
2025	Bachu Ni Benpani	Vipul Mehta	Rashmin Majithia	Siddharth Randeria, Ratna Pathak Shah, Devarshi Shah & Yutki Randeria	Gujarati	
2026	Lagan Laagii Re	Saandeep Patel	Rashmin Majithia	Malhar Thakar, Aarohi Patel, & Tatsat Munshi	Gujarati	
2026	Firki	Dharmessh Mehta	Rashmin Majithia	Johny Lever, Vatsal Sheth, Vrajesh Hirjee & Esha Kansara	Gujarati	

== Films distributed ==
Year	Film	Director	Language
2016	Passport	Rajesh Sharma	Gujarati
2017	Hameer	Ashok Patel	Gujarati
2017	Made For Each Other	Ashish Vyas, Jignesh Soni	Gujarati
2017	Devang	Dr. Irsan Trivedi	Gujarati
2017	Half Girlfriend	Mohit Suri	Hindi
2017	Raabta	Dinesh Vijan	Hindi
2017	Baadshaho	Milan Luthria	Hindi
2017	Simran	Hansal Mehta	Hindi
2017	Ranchi Diaries	Sattwik Mohanty	Hindi
2017	Best of Luck Laalu	Vipul Mehta	Gujarati
2017	Tumhari Sulu	Suresh Triveni	Hindi
2018	Joothanu	Chandradhar Rao Putta	Gujarati
2018	Ek Radha Ek Meera	Nilesh Indu Maruti Mohite	Gujarati
2018	Midnights with Menka	Viral Shah	Gujarati
2019	Baap Re Baap	Sagar Kalaria	Gujarati
2019	Chaal Jeevi Laiye	Vipul Mehta	Gujarati
2019	Majja Ni Life	Dinesh Patel & Vasant Goswami	Gujarati
2019	Sakhi Maari Southi Waali	Aakil Golawala	Gujarati
2019	Mister Kalakar	Feroze Irani	Gujarati
2022	Kehvatlal Parivar	Vipul Mehta	Gujarati
2023	Kutch Express	Viral Shah	Gujarati
2023	Nava Pappa	Ashok Patel	Gujarati
2023	Bushirt T-shirt	Ishaan Randeria	Gujarati
2024	Ole Aale	Vipul Mehta	Marathi
2025	Bachu Ni Benpani	Vipul Mehta	Gujarati
2026	Lagan Laagii Re	Saandeep Patel	Gujarati
