= List of Gujarati films of 2017 =

This is a list of Gujarati language films that were released in 2017. The Gujarati films collectively grossed ₹32 crore (US$3.4 million) in 2017, according to Ormax Box Office Report.

== January–March ==
Opening	Name	Genre	Director	Cast	Source
6 January	Tu Maro Dostar	Drama	Vikram Chauhan	Arjun Chauhan, Mihir Trivedi	
13 January	Hameer	Action	Ashok Patel	Ravi Kishan, Hiten Kumar, Chandni Chopra, Heena Rajput	
13 January	Grand Hali	Comedy	Devang Patel	Devang Patel, Hasmuk Bhavsar, Siddhi Idnani, Khevna Rajyaguru	
13 January	Janu Mari Lakhoma Ek	Romance	Bhagwan Waghela	Neha Soni, Jignesh Kaviraj, Hitu Kanodiya, Naresh Kanodia	
13 January	Shubh Aarambh	Drama	Amit Barot	Harsh Chhaya, Prachee Shah Paandya, Bharat Chawda, Deeksha Joshi, Aarjav Trivedi	
3 February	Gujju Rocks	Comedy	Patel Brothers	Vipul Vithlani, Priyanka Panchal, Sneha Salvi, Jaydeep Shah, Sajeed Patel	
3 February	Saathi	Action	Sajid Khan	Jeet Upendra, Jitu Pandya, Jayendra Mehta	
3 February	Superstar	Thriller	Bhavin Wadia	Dhruvin Shah, Rashami Desai	
10 February	Armaan: Story of a Storyteller	Drama	Rehan Chaudhary	Poojan Trivedi, Alisha Prajapati, Netri Trivedi, Prashant Barot	
10 February	Dhantya Open	Drama	Ajay Phansekar	Kiran Kumar, Naresh Kanodia, Anuradha Patel, Manav Gohil	
10 February	Love Virus	Comedy	Harshad Gadhavi	Ravi Sharma, Sunny Khatri, Kunal Pandya, Marjina Diwan	
10 February	Thun Thun Gopal	Comedy	Jaykar Bhojak	Dimple Upadhyay, Jitendra Thakkar, Jignesh Modi, Ritika Jilka	
10 February	Trupti	Mystery	Sabir Shaikh	Tiku Talsania, Sanjay Maurya, Zeel Joshi, Ayush Jadeja	
17 February	Carry On Kesar	Comedy	Vipul Mehta	Supriya Pathak, Darshan Jariwala, Avani Modi	
17 February	Duniyadari	Comedy	Shital Shah	Malhar Thakar, Arjav Trivedi, Esha Kansara	
24 February	Fodi Laishu Yaar	Comedy	Satyen Verma	Vishal Solanki, Alisha Prajapati, Chintan Dave, Koyal Shewale, Krishna Joshi, Naitik Desai and Vivek Pathak	
24 February	Last Chance	Drama	Vijay Limbachiya	Sanjay Maurya, Chintan Panchal, Shalini Pande, Nisarg Shah, Pratik Rathod	
3 March	Mad For Each Other	Drama	Ashish Vyas, Jignesh Soni	Abhijeet Sametriya, Neelam Gandhi	
3 March	O! Taareee	Thriller	Tapan Vyas	Janki Bodiwala, Jayesh More, Pratik Rathod, Revanta Sarabhai	
10 March	Love Story Ma Locho Padyo	Comedy	Manoj Nathvani	Hemant Jha, Dhavan Mevada, Megha Joshi, Grishma Mehta, Dilavar Bloch	
17 March	Devang	Thriller	Irsan Trivedi	Priyankk, Anita Purswani, Mihit Raval	
24 March	Pela Adhi Akshar	Romance	Kunal Shah	Aanshul Trivedi, Bhakti Kubavat, Parth Oza, Kaushal Shah	

== April–June ==
Opening	Name	Genre	Director	Cast	Source
14 April	Love Lagan Ne Locha	Comedy	Sabbir Qureshi	Jasmin Patel, Bhavik Bhojak, Mahi Sharma, Nisha Saha	
21 April	Love Lafru Lagan	Comedy	Himanshu Patel	Charuben Patel, Shivani Purohit, Jeet Upendra, Chini Rawal	
21 April	Monalisa	Drama	Iqbal Munshi	Linesh Fanse, Ragi Jani, Bharat Thakkar, Hasmukh Bhavsar	
19 May	Karsandas Pay & Use	Comedy	KrushnaDev Yagnik	Mayur Chauhan, Deeksha Joshi, Hemang Shah, Jay Bhatt, Chetan Daiya	
26 May	Samay Chakra	Romance	Amar Kumar Jadeja	Akash Shah, Apeksha Patel, Chandan Rathod, Dharmesh Vyas	
2 June	Aav Taru Kari Nakhu	Drama	Rahul Mevawala	Tiku Talsania, Monal Gajjar, Amar Upadhyay, Aditya Kapadiya, Tanvi Thakkar	
9 June	Band Baaja Babuchak	Comedy	Raahul Tewari	Bhavesh Visawadia, Mohsin Shaikh, Parth Rawal, Dhaval Nakhua, Palak Singh	
30 June	Reunion – Chalo Pachha Maliye	Drama	Mangal Gadhvi	Vanraj Sisodhiya, Foram Mehta, Ravi Sharma, Dipali Thacker	

== July–September ==
Opening	Name	Genre	Director	Cast	Source
7 July	Rok Tok	Drama	Bharat Sant	Nikkesha Rangwala, Mehul Bhojak	
14 July	Cash on Delivery	Thriller	Neeraj Joshi	Malhar Thakar, Vyoma Nandi, Darshan Jariwala, Anang Desai	
14 July	Gandhi ni Golmaal	Comedy	Ghanshyam Patel	Kavin Dave, Raj Jatania, Yatin Parmar, Shekhar Shukla	
21 July	Chor Bani Thangaat Kare	Comedy	Rahul Bhole	Amit Mistry, Prem Gadhvi, Bijal Joshi, Nirmit Vaishnav	
28 July	Tu Mari Aspaas Chhe	Thriller	Nilesh Patel	Yatin Parmar, Raj Jatania, Shriya Tiwari, Hardika Joshi	
28 July	Vitamin She	Romance	Faisal Hashmi	Dhvanit Thaker, Bhakti Kubavat, Kurush Deboo	
4 August	Roll No. 56	Drama	Bhavin Trivedi	Het Dave, Shruti Gholap, Ashok Kumar Beniwal, Akhilendra Mishra	
4 August	Wass...up! Zindagi	Comedy	Manoj Lalwani	Ravish Desai, Sonu Chandrapal, Prem Gadhavi, Jinal Belani	
11 August	Dikra Rakhje Vardini Laj	Action	D. Mewal	Rakesh Pande, Manisha Trivedi, Ravi Kale	
11 August	Jiv Thi Vali Mari Janudi	Drama	Pravin Chaudhary	Jignesh Kaviraj, Chini Raval	
18 August	Tamburo	Comedy	Shailesh Shankar	Manoj Joshi, Pratik Gandhi, Priiya Nair, Bharat Chawda	
25 August	Come On Baka	Comedy	Bharg K Shah	Raj Sampat Shah, Atul Lakahni, Hardik Anand	
25 August	Pappa Tamne Nahi Samjaay	Comedy	Dharmesh Mehta	Bhavya Gandhi, Manoj Joshi, Johnny Lever, Ketki Dave	
1 September	Colorbaaj	Comedy	Zanane Rajsingh	Deeksha Joshi, Dev Mehta, Kuntesh Bhatt, Harsh Thakkar	
1 September	Yashoda	Drama	Devdas Menon	Falguni Rajani, Shekhar Shukla	
8 September	Chimmanbhai Ni Chaal	Comedy	Rafiq Khan	Mobin Khan, Firoz Irani, Bimal Trivedi, Himani Agrawal	
8 September	Had Thai Gai	Drama	Hridesh K. Kamble	Gokul Baraiyaa, Zalakkumar Patel, Yamini Joshi, Riya Gor	
8 September	Rachna No Dabbo	Comedy	Rajan Joyner	Freddy Daruwala, Shalini Pandey, Nisarg Trivedi, Sharad Vyas	
15 September	Baap Vechvano Chhe	Comedy	Subhash J. Shah	Deepak Gheewala, Sagar Panchal, Umang Acharya, Hiral Patel	
15 September	Boss Have to Dhamaal	Comedy	Yuvraj Jadeja	Khevna Rajyaguru, Shaunak Vyas	

== October–December ==
Opening	Name	Genre	Director	Cast	Source
8 October	The End	Horror	Yogesh Joshi	Pranjal Bhatt, Ronak Pandya, Rohan Patel, Chintan Dave	
20 October	Lohi ni Sagai	Drama	Mayur Mehta	Jignesh Kaviraj, Yamini Joshi	
27 October	Best of Luck Laalu	Comedy	Vipul Mehta	Supriya Pathak, Muni Jha, Kurush Deboo, Smit Ganatra, Simran Natekar	
27 October	Gujarat to Mumbai	Drama	Kkalindi Dave	Aaditya Soni, Nilesh Amlani, Vansh Shah, Shachi Joshi, Preyasi Kothari	
3 November	Beep Beep Beep Lagi Gaya	Comedy	Avinash Khatri	Aakash Sippy, Ronak Pandya, Twishaa Bhatt, Jay Pandya	
3 November	Hu Tara Ishq Maa	Romance	Raj Boricha, Chanda Patel	Suraj Kumar, Priya Soni, Kaushal Shah, Sahil Shaikh	
3 November	Jyare Bolavu Tyare Dodine Aavje	Drama	Jagdish Chandra Bariya	Atul Lohar	
10 November	Bhanwar	Drama	Aditi Thakor	Neil Bhatt, Aditya Lakhia, Tarika Tripathi, Prashant Barot	
10 November	Love You Yaar	Drama	Hiralal Khatri	Rajpal Yadav, Akansha Solanki, Akash Shah, Bimal Trivedi	
17 November	Love Ni Bhavai	Romance	Saandeep Patel	Malhar Thakar, Pratik Gandhi, Aarohi Patel	
29 December	Chal Man Jeetva Jaiye	Drama	Dipesh Shah	Krishna Bharadwaj, Dharmendra Gohil, Hemen Chauhan, Rajeev Mehta	

== See also ==
- List of Gujarati films
- List of highest-grossing Gujarati films
