= Kanjoos Makhichoos =

2023 film by Vipul Mehta

- Official release poster
- Directed by: Vipul Mehta
- Written by: Vipul Mehta
- Based on: Sajan Re Jhooth Mat Bolo (Gujarati Play)
- Produced by: Deepak Mukut; Srishti Sharma; Kushagra Sharma
- Starring: Kunal Khemu; Shweta Tripathi; Piyush Mishra; Alka Amin; Rajiv Gupta; Raju Srivastava
- Cinematography: Pratik Parmar
- Music by: Songs: Sachin–Jigar; Guest Composition: Shabbir Ahmed; Background Score: Rachita Arora
- Production companies: Soham Rockstar Entertainment; ThunderSky Entertainment
- Distributed by: ZEE5
- Release date: 24 March 2023
- Running time: 116 minutes
- Country: India
- Language: Hindi

Kanjoos Makhichoos is an Indian Hindi-language comedy film directed by Vipul Mehta and produced by Soham Rockstar Entertainment along with ThunderSky Entertainment. The film is based on the famous Gujarati play Sajan Re Jhooth Mat Bolo. The film stars Kunal Khemu, Shweta Tripathi, Piyush Mishra, Alka Amin, Rajeev Gupta and Raju Srivastava. The film was released on 24 March 2023, on ZEE5. Kanjoos Makhichoos is comedian Raju Srivastav’s last film appearance.

== Plot ==
Set in Lucknow, Kanjoos Makhichoos is a black comedy about a miserly person named Jamnaprasad Pandey who saves money to send his parents on a pilgrimage. However, fate has other plans when he loses his parents in a flood. Jamuna Prasad Pandey is left distraught when he realises that he would be receiving only half the compensation amount announced by the government due to middlemen and rampant corruption. The rest of the story follows several hilarious twists including the twist that his parents actually survived and returned and turns as he fights against the corrupt system to get the rightful compensation.

== Cast ==
- Kunal Khemu as Jamuna Prasad Pandey
- Shweta Tripathi as Madhuri Pandey, Jamuna's wife
- Alish Nathani as Krish Pandey, Jamuna's son
- Piyush Mishra as Ganga Prasad Pandey, Jamuna's father
- Alka Amin as Saraswati Pandey, Jamuna's mother
- Hema Singh as Jhumri Pandey, Ganga's sister
- Raju Srivastava as Yadav
- Rajiv Gupta as Alok Chaturvedi
- Abhishek Giri as Harish
- Sachin Singh as Birju
- Avinash Shukla as Bansi
- Prashant Tiwari as Chhotu
- Yogesh Pandya as Agent Gupta

== Production ==
The shoots of the film started soon on 10 September 2021, on the occasion of Ganesh Chaturthi. The shoots were wrapped on Dusshera, 15 October 2021. The film was shot across Rishikesh and Lucknow.

== Music ==
The Background Score was composed by Rachita Arora and the songs were composed by Sachin–Jigar except one, which was guest composed by Shabbir Ahmed, while the lyrics were written by Shabbir Ahmed, Vayu and Priya Saraiya.
