= Falguni Pathak =

Indian singer

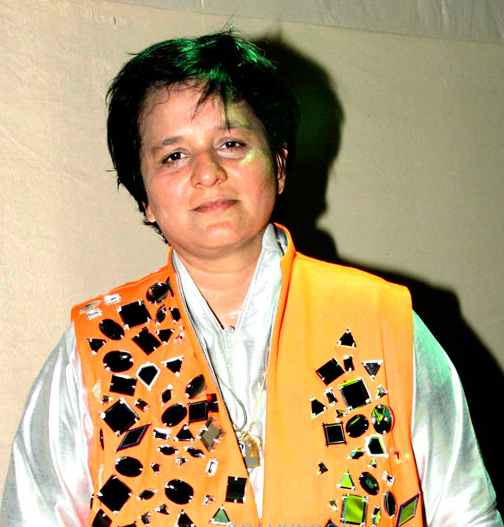
- Falguni Pathak at her dandiya show in Goregaon Sports
- Born: 12 March 1969 (age 57); Mumbai, Maharashtra, India
- Other name: Dandiya Queen
- Occupations: Pop singer, folk singer, playback singer, composer
- Years active: 1987–Present

Falguni Pathak (born 12 March 1969) is an Indian singer, performing artist and composer based in Mumbai. Her music is based on traditional musical forms from the Indian state of Gujarat. Since her professional debut in 1987, she has developed into an artist with a large fan base across India. Once asked how she decided to take up singing as a career, she replied that it happened by default.

Her debut album was released in 1998, and she has also recorded numerous songs for Bollywood movies. The theme of most of her songs is love. She has performed in many shows in India and other countries, backed by a band called Tha Thaiyaa. She has made appearances in television shows like Taarak Mehta Ka Ooltah Chashmah, Kaun Banega Crorepati, Star Dandiya Dhoom, Comedy Nights With Kapil, Baa Bahoo Aur Baby and Pandya Store.

She has some very popular Indian pop singles to her credit, still heard all over India. Her albums are not only famous for the music, but also for the love stories depicted within them. She is well-known amongst the Gujarati community, where she is called to perform for festivals like Navaratri.

Some of her popular songs are Chudi Jo Khanki Haathon Mein, Maine Payal Hai Chhankai, Meri Chunar Udd Udd Jaye, Ayi Pardesh Se Pariyon Ki Rani and Sawaan Mein.

In August 2013, it was reported that she would make ₹2 crores during the year's Navratri festivities. The singer was reportedly offered ₹70 lakh for each day she sings and performs for an event management company. The organisers were planning to utilize her popularity by wooing sponsors.

== Discography ==
Year	Album	Record label	Music Video(s)
2022	Vasaldi (Gujarati)	Hitz Music	"Vasaldi" featuring Falguni Pathak, Jigar Soni and Suhrad Soni
2017	Jode Rejo Raaj (Gujarati)	Himonshu Parikh Music	"Jode Rejo Raaj" featuring Altamash Faraz, and Hetvi Mehta
2012	Rut Ne Jo Bansi Bajayi	Universal Music India	"Rut Ne Jo Bansi Bajayi Huya re" featuring Anchal Singh, and Ankit Gupta
2004	Jhoom Jhoom	Universal Music India	"Dil Jhoom Jhoom Nache" featuring Parizaad Kolah
2002	Hawa Mein Udati Jaaye	Universal Music India	"Tera Mera Pyaar Sanam" featuring "Falguni Pathak" and "Bombay Vikings"
2002	Yeh Kisne Jadoo Kiya	Fontana Distribution/Universal Music India	"Yeh Kisne Jadoo Kiya" featuring Aamna Sharif, Mehul Bhojak, and Lalit Tehlan "Yeh Mera Kaajal" featuring Barkha Bisht Sengupta, and Niketan Madhok
2001	Saawariya Teri Yaad Mein	Fontana Distribution / Universal Music India	"Saawan Mein Morni" featuring Shweta Agarwal and Anirudh Pratap "Doli Doli Neend Mein Tere" featuring Shahid Kapoor, and "O Piya..O Piya Leke Doli Aa" featuring Sriti Jha
2001	Akou Mon	Regional Music Centre	"Dehati Fagune Nasuai" featuring Tina Barla
2000	Meri Chunar Udd Udd Jaye	Universal Music India	"Meri Chunar Udd Udd Jaye" featuring Trisha Krishnan, Ayesha Takia, and Santino Morea "Haire Meri Hui Gulabi Gaal" featuring Gurdeep Kohli "Aiyo Rama Haath Sey" featuring Divya Khosla Kumar and Anuj Khanna
1999	Maine Payal Hai Chhankai	Universal Music India	"Maine Payal Hai Chhankai" featuring Vivan Bhatena, Anita Pradhan Kharkar, and Avni Vasa "Pal Pal Teri Yaad" featuring Indraneil Sengupta and Sandali Sinha
1998	Yaad Piya Ki Aane Lagi	Fontana Distribution/Universal Music India	"Yaad Piya Ki Aane Lagi" featuring Riya Sen, Richa Pallod, and Kiran Janjani "Indhana Winva" featuring Mohammed Iqbal Khan and Sneha Chhabra Khan

== Unofficial albums ==
Year	Album	Record label
2019	Odhini Odhu	Tips Music
2008	Odhani	Tips Music
2008	Jhanjhariya	T-Series
2006	Now & Then (The Greatest Remix Album)	Universal Music India
2004	Rang Raseele Chhori	Vision Channel Limited

== Soundtracks ==
Year	Song	Film	Music director	Lyricist	Music label
2025	London Ke Limbdi	Umbarro (Gujarati)	Mehul Surti	Bhargav Purohit	Everest Entertainment
2022	Vahurani	Kehvatlal Parivar (Gujarati)	Sachin-Jigar	Bhargav Purohit	Zen Music Gujarati
2002	Kanha Teri Basuri	Leela	Shantanu Moitra	Abbas Tyrewala	Saregama
2002	Aha Aha	Na Tum Jaano Na Hum	Rajesh Roshan	Anand Bakshi	Saregama
2001	Nach Nach Nach	Deewaanapan	Aadesh Shrivastava	Sameer Anjaan	Saregama
2000	Baba Yeh Meri Jawani	Ghaath	Anu Malik	Sameer Anjaan	Sony Music India
1999	Yaad Piya Ki	Pyaar Koi Khel Nahin	Jatin-Lalit	Majrooh Sultanpuri	Universal Music India

== Religious music ==
Year	Album	Record label
2013	Best of Dhuns & Bhajans	Universal Music India
2003	Malaun No 1	Universal Music India
2002	Vandan: Aavo Shrivallabh	Universal Music India
2001	Arpan (Vallabh Ke Charnarvind)	Universal Music India
