= Lagan Laagii Re =

2026 film directed by Sandeep Patel

- Official Poster
- Directed by: Saandeep Patel
- Written by: Mitai Shukla; Nehal Bakshi
- Produced by: Rashmin Majithia; Aarti Patel (Co-Producer)
- Starring: Malhar Thakar; Aarohi Patel; Tatsat Munshi
- Cinematography: Tapan Vyas
- Production companies: Coconut Motion Pictures; Akshar Communications
- Distributed by: Coconut Movies Release
- Release date: 6 February 2026
- Country: India
- Language: Gujarati

Lagan Laagii Re is a 2026 Gujarati family drama, directed by Sandeep Patel. Starring Malhar Thakar, Aarohi Patel, Tatsat Munshi and others. The film is produced under the banner of Coconut Motion Pictures by Rashmin Majithia in association with Akshar Communications by Aarti Patel as a Co-Producer.

== Cast ==
- Malhar Thakar
- Aarohi Patel
- Tatsat Munshi
- Vedika Kaul Vyas
- Aarti Patel
- Ragi Jani
- Hemang Dave
- Nisarg Trivedi
- Manisha Trivedi

== Production ==
The film was shot at various locations in Ahmedabad. Niren Bhatt has penned the lyrics of the film. The music has been acquired by Zen Music Gujarati.

== Soundtrack ==
Niren Bhatt has given the lyrics for all the songs.

Lagan Laagii Re

Soundtrack album
- Released: 2026
- Genre: Feature film soundtrack
- Length: 18:46
- Language: Gujarati
- Label: Zen Music Gujarati
External audio
- [https://www.youtube.com/watch?v=BQH9aEVsY0Y on YouTube

=== Tracklist ===
All lyrics are written by Niren Bhatt; all music is composed by Zen Music Gujarati.

Track listing
No.	Title	Lyrics	Music	Singer(s)	Length
1.	"Baby Bewafa"	Niren Bhatt	Zen Music Gujarati	Jignesh Barot	03:03
2.	"Ame To Karishu Prem"	Niren Bhatt	Zen Music Gujarati	Jigardan Gadhavi	02:40
3.	"Tame Vaato Karjo Prem Ni"	Niren Bhatt	Zen Music Gujarati	Aishwarya Majmudar	02:00
4.	"Lagan Laagii Re (Title Track)"	Niren Bhatt	Zen Music Gujarati	Aishwarya Majmudar; Jigardan Gadhavi	04:35
5.	"Lagan Laagii Re (Climax Version)"	Niren Bhatt	Zen Music Gujarati	Aishwarya Majmudar	01:04
6.	"Nindardi"	Niren Bhatt	Zen Music Gujarati	Aishwarya Majmudar	03:28
7.	"Booma Boom"	Niren Bhatt	Kedar - Bhargav	Umesh Barot	03:10
Total length:					18:46

== Marketing and Releases ==
The release announcement of the film made on December 31st 2025 on social media. The teaser of the film released on January 3rd 2026 on social media. The song Baby Bewafa which sung by Jignesh Barot released on January 7th 2026 on social media. Ame to Karishu Prem song which sung by Jigardan Gadhavi released on January 18th 2026. The Trailer of film released on January 24th 2026 on social media.

== See also ==
- List of Gujarati films of 2026
