= Midnights with Menka =

2018 Gujarati comedy drama film

Midnights With Menka
- Directed by: Viral Shah
- Written by: Amatya Goradia; Viral Shah
- Produced by: Rashmin Majithia
- Starring: Malhar Thakar; Esha Kansara; Hardik Sangani; Vinita Mahesh; Parth Oza
- Cinematography: Vikas Joshi
- Edited by: Cheragh Todiwala
- Music by: Ambresh Shroff
- Production company: Coconut Motion Pictures
- Distributed by: Coconut Movies Release
- Release date: 7 December 2018
- Country: India
- Language: Gujarati

Midnights With Menka is a 2018 Gujarati comedy drama film produced by Rashmin Majithia under the banner Coconut Motion Pictures, and written and directed by Viral Shah. The film is about a fake biopic of Gujarati movie star Malhar Thakar, who finds a quick hack to his way to stardom followed by the consequences he has to face.

== Plot ==
Midnights With Menka revolves around Malhar Thakar, the superstar of the world of Gujarati cinema and his rich best friend Hardik, his biggest fangirl Esha, and his suboptimal sister Riya.

Hunger for success and fame leads them to indulge in some undesirable scenarios and obstacles, making their troubled lives even harder. Seeking a way to save their doomed worlds, they take a bouncy ride through friendship, fame, humour, love and a plethora of emotions.

== Cast ==
- Naresh Kanodia (Special Appearance)

 Malhar Thakar as Malhar

- Esha Kansara as Esha
- Hardik Sangani as Hardik
- Vinita Mahesh as Riya
- Parth Oza as Rahul
- Ragi Jani as Police Inspector (Special Appearance)

== Soundtrack ==
Midnights With Menka

Soundtrack album by Ambresh Shroff, Ash King & Shruti Pathak
- Language: Gujarati
- Label: Zen Music Gujarati

Music Director Ambresh Shroff has composed the film’s music along with a song "I am the Superstar" sung by Ambresh Shroff and lyrics by Dilip Rawal. Kya Jawaa Gaya sung by Ash King and Shruti Pathak. Songs Mixed And mastered by Aftab khan at Headroom Studio and Assisted by Vatsal Chevli.

#	Title	Lyrics	Music	Singer	Length
1	I Am the Superstar	Dilip Rawal	Ambresh Shroff	Ambresh Shroff	2:13
2	Kya Jawaa Gaya	Sneha Desai	Ambresh Shroff	Ash King, Shruti Pathak	4:51

== Reception ==
The Times of India rated it 3/5 and said, "Overall, it's an average watch with a constant dose of humour."
