= Bushirt T-shirt =

2023 Gujarati film

- Official poster
- Gujarati: બુશર્ટ ટી-શર્ટ
- Directed by: Ishaan Randeria
- Written by: Ishaan Randeria
- Produced by: Rashmin Majithia
- Starring: Siddharth Randeria; Kamlesh Ozza; Vandana Pathak; Reeva Rachh
- Cinematography: Pratik Parmar
- Edited by: Tushar Parekh
- Music by: Sachin-Jigar
- Production company: Coconut Motion Pictures
- Distributed by: Coconut Movies Release
- Release date: 5 May 2023
- Running time: 144 minutes
- Country: India
- Language: Gujarati
- Box office: ₹8.72 cr

Bushirt T-shirt is a 2023 Indian Gujarati comedy drama film written and directed by Ishaan Randeria and produced by Rashmin Majithia under the banner Coconut Motion Pictures. It stars Siddharth Randeria, Kamlesh Ozza, Vandana Pathak and Reeva Rachh in the lead roles. It was released on 5 May 2023 and received positively by critics.

== Cast ==
The cast is as follows:

- Siddharth Randeria as Bhupat Pandya
- Kamlesh Ozza as Harsh Pandya
- Vandana Pathak as Manju Pandya
- Reeva Rachh as Payal
- Hardik Sangani as Divyang
- Kuldeep Gor as Jamnadas
- Muni Jha as Ajay
- Sunil Vishrani as Kotak
- Bhakti Kubavat as Mansi
- Rajesh Khatri as Navjee
- Dilip Rawal as Jitu
- Manan Desai as Hemang Shah
- Maulik Chauhan as Kunal
- Pavneet Bagga as Kuldeep Singh

== Production ==
The film is written and directed by Ishaan Randeria. It is produced by Rashmin Majithia under the banner of Coconut Motion Pictures. It stars Siddharth Randeria, Kamlesh Ozza, Vandana Pathak and Reeva Rachh in lead roles. The film focuses on the issue of generation gap between father and son.

The film was shot in Ahmedabad and the shooting was completed in 32 days.

== Soundtrack ==
Bushirt T-shirt

Soundtrack album by Sachin–Jigar
- Released: 22 April 2023
- Genre: Feature film soundtrack
- Length: 6:33
- Language: Gujarati
- Label: Zen Music Gujarati
- Producer: Rashmin Majithia

All lyrics are written by Niren Bhatt; all music is composed by Sachin–Jigar.

Track listing
No.	Title	Singer(s)	Length
1.	"Dahyo Babo"	Sachin-Jigar, Sachin Sanghvi, Aghori Muzik	1:49
2.	"Kaka Kamarna Halaav"	Divya Kumar, Bhoomi Trivedi, Aghori Muzik	2:54
3.	"Bushirt T-shirt"	Ishaan Randeria, Mansheel Gujral, Advait Nemlekar	1:50
4.	"Mara Dariya No Tu Che Kinaro"	Sachin-Jigar, Akshat Shah	4:32
Total length:			10:25

== Marketing and release ==
The motion poster was released on 11 April 2023. The trailer was shared by Randeria on social media on 17 April 2023. The film was released on 5 May 2023.

== Reception ==
The film grossed est. ₹3.27 crore (US$340,000) in the first 10 days, according to FilmyFenil.

Shruti Jambhekar of The Times of India rated it 3.5 out of 5. She praised production, direction, screenplay and performances. Neeraj Solanki of The Heart News rated in 4 out of 5. He praised the story, theme, comedy and performances but criticised music and some scenes in the second half of the film. Fenil Seta rated it 3.5 out of 5 and he found direction, screenplay and story praiseworthy while criticised some characters' development.
