= Hurry Om Hurry =

2023 film directed by Nisarg Vaidya

Hari Om Hurry
- Movie poster
- Directed by: Nisarg Vaidya
- Written by: Vinod K Sarvaiya; Nisarg Vaidya; Viral Shah; Hardik Sangani
- Produced by: Sanjay Chhabria
- Starring: Siddharth Randeria; Raunaq Kamdar; Vyoma Nandi; Malhaar Rathod
- Cinematography: Milind Jog
- Music by: Parth Bharat Thakkar
- Production company: Everest Entertainment LLP
- Distributed by: PVR Inox Pictures
- Release date: 8 December 2023
- Running time: 147 minutes
- Country: India
- Language: Gujarati

Hari Om Hurry is a 2023 Gujarati comedy film directed and written by Nisarg Vaidya, with co-writing by Vinod K Sarvaiya, Viral Shah and Hardik Sangani. It stars Siddharth Randeria, Raunaq Kamdar, Vyoma Nandi, and Malhaar Rathod. The film is produced by Sanjay Chhabria under the banner of Everest Entertainment LLP, and it has been distributed by PVR Inox Pictures. The film is inspired by Oh My Kadavule (2020) with a slightly altered storyline and a change in some dialogues

== Plot ==
Longtime friends, Om and Vini find their lives taking an unforeseen turn when Vini decides to propose marriage to Om. However, their once-promising union encounters stumbling blocks as Om begins to drift away, leaving Vini with a profound sense of betrayal. Just when all hope seems lost, a strange encounter shakes Om's world, promising to alter the course of everything.

== Cast ==
- Siddharth Randeria as Harihar
- Raunaq Kamdar as Om
- Vyoma Nandi as Vini
- Malhaar Rathod as Myra
- Shivam Parekh as Fenil
- Bhumi Rajgor as Fenil's wife
- Ragi Jani as Om's father
- Kalpesh Patel as Vini's father
- Lopa Shah as Om's mother

== Production ==
The movie has been produced by Sanjay Chhabria under the banner of Everest Entertainment LLP, which has produced more than 25 marathi films and it is directed by Nisarg Vaidya.

The music for the film has been composed by Parth Bharat Thakkar. Armaan Malik, Aditya Gadhvi, Kirtidan Gadhvi, Bhoomi Trivedi, and Salim Merchant contributed their voices, while Priya Saraiya, Niren Bhatt and Dilip Rawal provided the lyrics for the soundtrack.

The entire movie has been shoot at different part of Ahmedabad and Jaisalmer.

== Soundtrack ==
Hari Om Hurry

Studio album by Parth Bharat Thakkar
- Released: 11 October 2023
- Genre: Feature film soundtrack
- Length: 15:11
- Language: Gujarati
- Label: Everest Entertainment LLP

=== Tracklist ===
No.	Title	Lyrics	Music	Singer(s)	Length
1.	"Vahlida"	Dilip Rawal	Parth Bharat Thakkar	Kirtidan Gadhvi & Bhoomi Trivedi	3:11
2.	"Chal Taali Aap"	Priya Saraiya	Parth Bharat Thakkar	Armaan Malik & Aditya Gadhvi	4:00
3.	"Malki Re"	Niren Bhatt	Parth Bharat Thakkar	Salim-Sulaiman - Salim Merchant	3:33
4.	"Kinare"	Priya Saraiya	Parth Bharat Thakkar	Shekhar Ravjiani	4:31
Total length:					07:11

== Release ==
The first look of the film was announced on 31 July 2023. The teaser of the film was released on 29 September 2023. The film was released in theatre on 8 December 2023. It is inspired by Oh My Kadavule (2020), with some minor changes in dialogues and storyline, it has done justice with original movie.

== Accolades ==
The film received 4 nominations at the 21st Transmedia Gujarati Awards.

== See also ==
- List of Gujarati films of 2023
