= Hu ane Tu =

2023 Gujarati comedy film

- Theatrical poster
- Directed by: Manan Sagar
- Written by: Vinod K Sarvaiya
- Produced by: Kumar Mangat Pathak; Abhishek Pathak; Siddharth Randeria; Ishaan Randeria
- Starring: Siddharth Randeria; Sonali Lele Desai; Parikshit Tamaliya; Puja Joshi
- Cinematography: Vikas Joshi
- Music by: Kedar & Bhargav
- Production companies: Panorama Studios; Siddharth Randeria Production LLP
- Distributed by: Panorama Studios
- Release date: 15 September 2023
- Running time: 120 minutes
- Country: India
- Language: Gujarati

Hu ane Tu is a 2023 Gujarati comedy film directed by Manan Sagar and written by Vinod K Sarvaiya . It stars Siddharth Randeria. Sonali Lele Desai, Puja Joshi and Parikshit Tamaliya. The film is produced by Kumar Mangat Pathak, Abhishek Pathak, Siddharth Randeria and Ishaan Randeria. The film was distributed by Panorama Studios and Music rights has been acquired by Panorama Music.

== Plot ==
The story revolves around Umesh, who rekindles his romance with his long-lost college crush Ketaki, a divorcee. Meanwhile, Umesh's son Tejas meets the girl of his dreams: Reva. As the father and son prepare for a double wedding, they encounter numerous challenges. What ensues is roller-coaster ride entailing misunderstandings, twists and trials as they navigate the crossroads of tradition and modernity.

== Cast ==
- Siddharth Randeria as Umesh
- Sonali Lele Desai as Ketki
- Parikshit Tamaliya as Tejas
- Puja Joshi as Reva
- Pankaj Anand as Ranjit Singh Reva father

== Production ==
It is produced under the banner of Panorama Studios and Siddharth Randeria Productions LLP. The music of the film has been given by Kedar & Bhargav. The movie has been shot across different locations in the state of Gujarat.

== Soundtrack ==
Hu ane Tu

Studio album by Kedar and Bhargav
- Released: 1 August 2023
- Genre: Feature film soundtrack
- Length: 8:19
- Label: Panorama Music

=== Tracklist ===
The soundtrack of the album is composed by Kedar & Bhaargav with lyrics written by Bhargav Purohit, & Milind Gadhvi. The soundtrack album consists of four tracks.

No.	Title	Lyrics	Music	Singer(s)	Length
1.	"Supdasaaf"	Bhargav Purohit	Kedar & Bhargav	Nakash Aziz	2:57
2.	"Re Sanam"	Milind Gadhavi	Kedar & Bhargav	Siddharth Amit Bhavsar	3:25
3.	"Jobaniyu"	Bhargav Purohit	Kedar & Bhargav	Umesh Barot	2:29
Total length:					12:20

== Release ==
The trailer of the film released by Bollywood's superstar Ajay Devgan in Mumbai. The film was released theatrically on 15 September 2023.

== Accolades ==
The film received 9 nominations at the 21st Transmedia Gujarati Awards.

== See also ==
- List of Gujarati films of 2023
