= Gujarat 11 =

2019 Indian film by Jayant Gilatar

- Official Poster
- Directed by: Jayant Gilatar
- Written by: Jayant Gilatar; Shilpa Ganji; Vyas Hemang; Rajesh Latkar; Shubhendra Pal; Dilip Rawal
- Produced by: Jayant Gilatar; M.S. Jolly; Haresh Patel; Yash Shah
- Starring: Daisy Shah; Pratik Gandhi; Kavin Dave; Chetan Daiya
- Cinematography: Raja Phadtare; Vishal Sangwai
- Edited by: Pankaj Sapkale
- Music by: Roopkumar Rathod
- Production companies: H G Pictures; J.J. Creatiions
- Release date: 29 November 2019
- Running time: 140 minutes
- Country: India
- Language: Gujarati

Gujarat 11 is a 2019 first-ever Gujarati sports drama film directed by Jayant Gilatar. It stars Daisy Shah, Pratik Gandhi, Kavin Dave, and Chetan Daiya in a lead role.

== Plot ==
Gujarat 11 is the story of an ex-football player, Divya, who takes up the challenge of training juvenile home boys for a state-level football tournament.

== Cast ==
- Daisy Shah
- Pratik Gandhi
- Kavin Dave
- Chetan Daiya
- Ayush Doshi

== Production ==
The film was produced under the banner of H G Pictures and J.J. Creatiions. The music of the film has been given by Roopkumar Rathod, and music rights is acquired by Zee Music Company.

== Soundtrack ==
Gujarat 11

Studio album by Roopkumar Rathod
- Released: 29 November 2019
- Genre: Feature film soundtrack
- Length: 8:23
- Language: Gujarati

=== Tracklist ===
All lyrics are written by Dilip Raval; all music is composed by Roopkumar Rathod.

No.	Title	Lyrics	Music	Singer(s)	Length
1.	"Dholida"	Dilip Raval	Roopkumar Rathod	Roopkumar Rathod and Chorus	5:17
2.	"Josh Che"	Dilip Raval	Roopkumar Rathod	Roopkumar Rathod, Saurabh Mehta, Shlok Chaudhry, Madan Shukla, Kapil Kumar & Chorus	3:06
Total length:					8:23

== Marketing and release ==
Gujarat 11 is the first Gujarati Sport Drama movie. Salman Khan praised the teaser of the film and wished luck to Daisy Shah for her Debut in Gujarati Film. The trailer of the film was released on 15 November 2019. The film was theatrically released on 29 November 2019.

== Reception ==
Shreya Iyer from The Times of India rated 3 stars out of 5 and praised the direction, performances and music of the film.

== See also ==
- List of Gujarati films of 2019
