= Ole Aale =

2024 Indian comedy drama film

- Theatrical release poster
- Directed by: Vipul Mehta
- Written by: Vipul Mehta and Jainesh Ejardar
- Produced by: Rashmin Majithia
- Starring: Nana Patekar; Siddharth Chandekar; Sayali Sanjeev; Makarand Anaspure; Tanvi Azmi
- Cinematography: Gulam N.S.
- Music by: Sachin–Jigar
- Production company: Coconut Motion Pictures
- Distributed by: Coconut Movies Release
- Release date: 5 January 2024
- Running time: 146 minutes
- Country: India
- Language: Marathi
- Box office: ₹8.33 crore (US$870,000)

Ole Aale is a 2024 Indian Marathi-language comedy drama road film written and directed by Vipul Mehta, and produced by Rashmin Majithia under the banner Coconut Motion Pictures. The film stars Nana Patekar, Siddharth Chandekar, Sayali Sanjeev and Makarand Anaspure. The film is a remake of the 2019 Gujarati superhit film Chaal Jeevi Laiye. The soundtrack was composed by Sachin–Jigar. It is about a father-son relationship. Ole Aale received critical acclaim with 8 nominations at the Filmfare Awards Marathi 2025, recognising both its artistic and technical excellence.

It is ace actor Nana Patekar's last Marathi film.

== Plot ==
Workaholic Aditya (Siddharth Chandekar) ignores his father Omkar's (Nana Patekar) advice regarding health. The next day, Aditya faints and is brought to the hospital, where he recovers. On Dr. Pallavi's (Tanvi Azmi) advice, Omkar takes a health checkup and is diagnosed with Pontine Glioma, a terminal brain tumour. Omkar wishes to visit Kedarnath and the holy Ganga river with him before his death so Aditya reluctantly agrees. After visiting the river, they continued their journey to Chopta via jeep. They meet Kyra (Sayali Sanjeev) on the road and Aditya develops romantic interest in her. They were robbed by goons but eventually regained their possessions. Along the way, the father-son bond grows and Aditya's romance develops further. Eventually, they reach Kedarnath and complete the wish.

== Cast ==
- Nana Patekar as Omkar Lele
- Siddharth Chandekar as Aditya Lele
- Sayali Sanjeev as Kyra Hirve
- Makarand Anaspure as Baburao
- Tanvi Azmi as Dr. Pallavi Pradhan
- Badrish Chhabra as Negi tea shop owner
- Deepankaj Poonia as Guest
- Sanjeev Dhuri as Kadam
- Avinash Kulkarni as Aditya's friend

== Production ==
The film was shot in Uttarakhand at the locations of Haridwar, Chopta and Kedarnath.

== Soundtrack ==
Ole Aale

Soundtrack album by Sachin–Jigar
- Released: 9 December 2019
- Genre: Feature film soundtrack
- Length: 14:16
- Language: Marathi
- Label: Zen Music Marathi

All lyrics are written by Mandar Cholkar; all music is composed by Sachin–Jigar.

Track listing
No.	Title	Singer(s)	Length
1.	"Zagamaga "	Avdhoot Gupte, Shalmali Kholgade	3:26
2.	"Phulpakharu"	Rohit Raut	5:15
3.	"Angai"	Shankar Mahadevan	3:50
Total length:			12:31

== Release and box office collection ==
The film was theatrically released on 5 January 2024 clashed with Satyashodhak and Panchak. Ole Aale movie collected 0.30 Crore net box office collection on its first day. The film saw significant growth on the second day and collected 0.60 Crore nett. the film managed to earn well at the box office on its 1st Weekend and collected 1.80 Crore nett. Ole Aale has collected ₹8.33 crores till present.

== Reception ==
=== Critical reception ===
Reshma Raikwar from Loksatta praised the story, screenplay and direction as well as the performances, especially of Patekar. Devendra Jadhav from Sakal rated it 3 out of 5 and praised performances and theme but criticised the long story especially in second half. Jaydeep Pathakji from The Times of India rated it 3.5 out of 5 and praised story, screenplay, direction and performances. Harshada Bhirvandekar from Hindustan Times wrote "Sometimes laughing, sometimes bringing tears to the eyes, this 'Ole Aale' journey entertains the audience till the end".
