= Ajab Raat Ni Gajab Vaat =

Gujarati comedy movie

Ajab Gajab Raat Ni Gajab Vaat
- Official Poster
- Directed by: Prem Gadhvi; Killol Parmar
- Written by: Prem Gadhavi; Aditi Varma; Nikita Shah
- Produced by: Dr Jayesh Pavra
- Starring: Bhavya Gandhi; Aarohi Patel; Deep Vaidya; Radhika Barot; RJ Harsh
- Cinematography: Jaymin
- Edited by: Harsh Shah
- Music by: Kushal Choksi
- Production company: Pavra Entertainment
- Distributed by: Rupam Entertainment Pvt Ltd
- Release date: 15 November 2024
- Running time: 122.00 minutes
- Country: India
- Language: Gujarati

Ajab Raat Ni Gajab Vaat is a 2024 Gujarati comedy drama, directed by Prem Gadhavi & Killol Parmar and written by Prem Gadhavi, Aditi Varma & Nikita Shah. It stars Bhavya Gandhi Aarohi Patel, Deep Vaidya, Radhika Barot & RJ Harsh. The film is produced by Dr. Jayesh Pavra The film will be distributed by Rupam Entertainment Pvt Ltd

== Plot ==
Kartik, a young YouTuber, is known for conducting loyalty tests on females. His friend Nilay urges him to devise an elopement plan for his girlfriend. Things take a complicated turn when they reach the wrong address and a different girl runs away with them.

== Cast ==
- Bhavya Gandhi as Kartik
- Aarohi Patel as Pranali
- Deep Vaidya as Tanmay
- Radhika Barot as Kinjal
- RJ Harsh as Nilay

== Production ==
The film was shot at various locations in Ahmedabad Gujarat. In 22 days the shoot of the film gets completed.

== Soundtrack ==
Ajab Raat Ni Gajab Vaat

Soundtrack album by Kushal Chokshi
- Released: 2024
- Genre: Feature film soundtrack
- Length: 7:31
- Language: Gujarati
- Label: Pavra Entertainment

All lyrics are written by Munaf Luhar &Janki Gadhavi; all music is composed by Kushal Chokshi.

Track listing
No.	Title	Lyrics	Music	Singer(s)	Length
1.	"Sawariya"	Munaf Luhar	Kushal Chokshi	Khusal Chokshi & Aamir Mir	3:09
2.	"Ajab Raat Ni Gajab Vaat - Title Track"	Janki Gadhavi	Kushal Chokshi	Kushal Chokshi	2:42
Total length:					5:11

== Marketing and releases ==
The first look announced on August 7, 2024, and official teaser of the film released on August 29, 2024. The film was released on November 15, 2024.

== See also ==
- List of Gujarati films of 2024
