= Chaal Jeevi Laiye! =

2019 Indian drama film

- Chaal Jeevi Laiye Official Poster
- Directed by: Vipul Mehta
- Written by: Vipul Mehta and Jainesh Ejardar
- Produced by: Rashmin Majithia
- Starring: Siddharth Randeria; Yash Soni; Aarohi Patel
- Cinematography: Pratik Parmar
- Edited by: Jitendra K Shah
- Music by: Sachin–Jigar
- Production company: Coconut Motion Pictures
- Distributed by: Coconut Movies Release
- Release date: 1 February 2019
- Running time: 146 minutes
- Country: India
- Language: Gujarati
- Box office: est. ₹50 crore (US$5.2 million)

Chaal Jeevi Laiye! (Gujarati: ચાલ જીવી લઈયે! transl. Come, Let's Live!) is a 2019 Indian Gujarati-language comedy drama road film written and directed by Vipul Mehta, and produced by Rashmin Majithia under the banner Coconut Motion Pictures. The film stars Siddharth Randeria, Yash Soni, and Aarohi Patel. The soundtrack was composed by Sachin–Jigar.

The film was released in India on 1 February 2019. and entered its 8th year in cinemas on 1 February 2026. It became one of the highest-grossing film of Gujarati cinema, grossing over est. ₹50 crore (US$5.2 million) and the first film released in this century to enter its 8th year in cinemas. It is remade in Marathi as Ole Aale (2024), starring Nana Patekar, Siddharth Chandekar, Sayali Sanjeev and the ace actor Makarand Anaspure in the lead.

== Plot ==
Workaholic Aditya ignores his father Bipin's advice regarding his health. Next day, Aditya faints and is brought to a hospital, where he recovers. On Dr. Vadia's advice, Bipin takes a health checkup and is diagnosed with Pontine Glioma, a terminal brain tumour. Bipin wishes to visit Kedarnath and the holy Ganga river with Aditya before his death and he reluctantly agrees. After visiting the river, they continued their journey to Chopta via jeep. They meet Ketki on road and Aditya develops romantic interest in her. They were robbed by goons but eventually regain their possessions. Along the way, the father-son bond grows and Aditya's romance develops further. Eventually, they reach Kedarnath and complete the wish.

== Cast ==
- Siddharth Randeria as Bipin Chandra Parikh
- Yash Soni as Aditya Parikh
- Aarohi Patel as Ketki Mehta
- Jagesh Mukati as Bhala Kaka
- Aruna Irani as Dr. Vadia (guest appearance)

== Production ==
The film is shot in Uttarakhand at various locations in Haridwar, Chopta and Kedarnath.

== Soundtrack ==
Chaal Jeevi Laiye

Soundtrack album by Sachin–Jigar
- Released: 21 January 2019
- Genre: Feature film soundtrack
- Length: 17:21
- Language: Gujarati
- Label: Zen Music Gujarati
External audio
- 'Chaal Jeevi Laiye' songs Album on JioSaavn

All lyrics are written by Niren Bhatt; all music is composed by Sachin–Jigar.

Track listing
No.	Title	Singer(s)	Length
1.	"Chaand Ne Kaho"	Jigardan Gadhavi, Sachin Sanghvi & Tanishkaa Sanghvi	5:19
2.	"Pa Pa Pagli"	Sonu Nigam	4:36
3.	"Ghanu Jeevo"	Keerthi Sagathia & Bhoomi Trivedi	3:05
4.	"Ghanu Jeevo (Reprise Version)"	Keerthi Sagathia, Bhoomi Trivedi	1:13
5.	"Unplugged-Chaand Ne Kaho"	Sachin Sanghvi	3:48
Total length:			17:21

The songs were leaked online before their official release.

== Release ==
The film was released in India on 1 February 2019. Following the success, it was released in Australia on 14 March 2019 and in New Zealand, and United Kingdom on 15 March 2019. The film was also released in Germany, Singapore, Canada and in some countries of Africa. The film completed 50 weeks in cinemas on 17 January 2020. It was re-released on 31 January 2020 with subtitles and some additional shots.

== Reception ==
=== Box Office ===
According to Bookmyshow, an online ticket booking website, the film earned around ₹44 lakh (US$46,000) on its first day and almost ₹7 crore (US$730,000) in first week. According to trade analyst Komal Nahta, the film became the highest-grossing film of Gujarati cinema. It had collected a gross amount of approximately ₹50 crore (US$5.2 million) and the netted approximately ₹40−42 crore in India. In overseas market, according to Rentrak, the film earned $130,000 in US, $53,031 in United Kingdom, $81,814 in Australia, $13,159 in New Zealand and $25,000 elsewhere. The film grossed over approximately about $3,03,004 (₹2.14 crore) in total in overseas market.

=== Critical response ===
The film received mostly positive reviews by the critics. Shruti Jambhekar of The Times of India rated it 4 out of 5 and praised the director for screenplay, editing, cinematography, music and performances. Saurabh Shah rated it 4 out of 5 and praised direction, music and performances but criticised the length of the climax. Mid-day Gujarati noted the trend of films based on the father-son relationships and gave a positive review. Tushar Dave, writing for Sarjak.org, praised the film for its message, cinematography, music and performances of lead actors but criticised some of the dialogue, melodrama, performance of Aruna Irani and length of the climax.

== See also ==
- List of Gujarati films of 2019
- List of highest-grossing Indian films
