= Bachu Ni Benpani =

2025 Indian film by Vipul Mehta

- Official poster
- Directed by: Vipul Mehta
- Written by: Vipul Mehta
- Produced by: Rashmin Majithia
- Starring: Siddharth Randeria; Ratna Pathak Shah; Devarshi Shah; Yukti Randeria; Prince Limbadiya; Jahnvi Chauhan; Gopi Desai
- Cinematography: Pratik Parmar
- Edited by: Jitendra Shah
- Music by: Siddharth Amit Bhavsar
- Production company: Coconut Motion Pictures
- Distributed by: Coconut Movies Release
- Release date: 27 August 2025
- Running time: 129 minutes
- Country: India
- Language: Gujarati

Bachu Ni Benpani is a 2025 Indian Gujarati comedy drama film written and directed by Vipul Mehta. It stars Siddharth Randeria, Ratna Pathak Shah, Devarshi Shah, and Yukti Randeria in lead roles. Produced by Rashmin Majithia under banner of Coconut Motion Pictures, it was released on 27 August 2025.

== Cast ==
The cast is as follows:

- Siddharth Randeria as Bachu Bapodra
- Ratna Pathak Shah as Suman Gauri Nagar
- Devarshi Shah as Vicky, Bachu's younger son
- Yukti Randeria as Jassi, the Punjabi girl, Vicky's love interest
- Prince Limbadiya as Aagam, Bachu's elder son
- Jahnvi Chauhan as Preeti, Aagam's wife
- Gopi Desai as Chandrika (Chandu), Bachu's sister

== Plot ==
Bachu Bapodra has a fear of an illness and death. So to save money, he exploits every opportunity for freebies and to avoid spending. His elder son is married and expecting a child. His younger son Vicky loves Jassi and desires to marry her which is opposed by Bachu. His unmarried sister, Chandrika, who resides separately due to his parsimonious nature.

Despite his initial reluctance, particularly concerning travel to Bangkok owing to prevalent Gujarati societal perceptions, Bachu is persuaded go Bengkok himself, ostensibly for a pilgrimage to Char Dham.

== Production ==
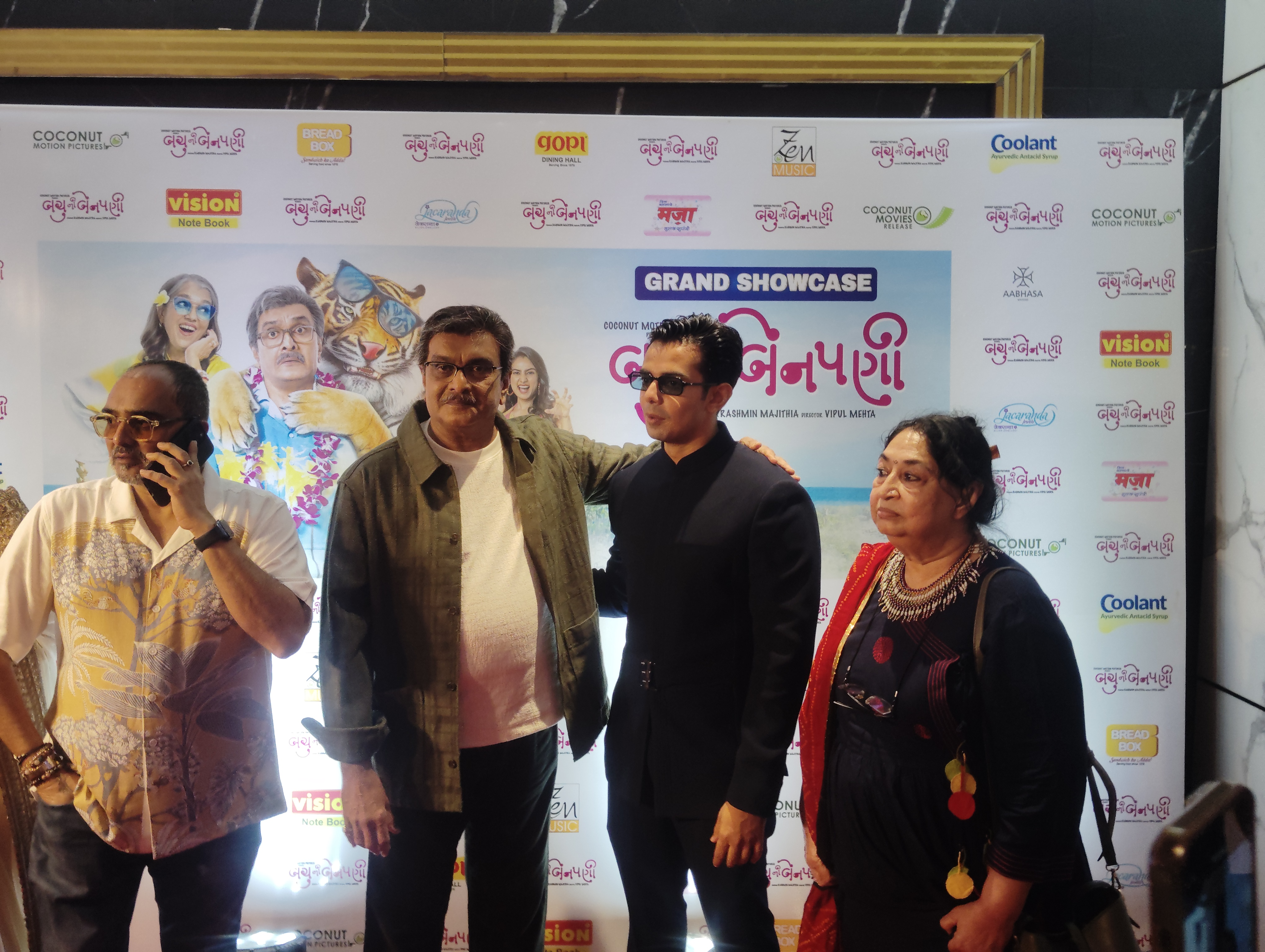
Director Vipul Mehta, Siddharth Randeria, Devarshi Shah and Gopi Desai

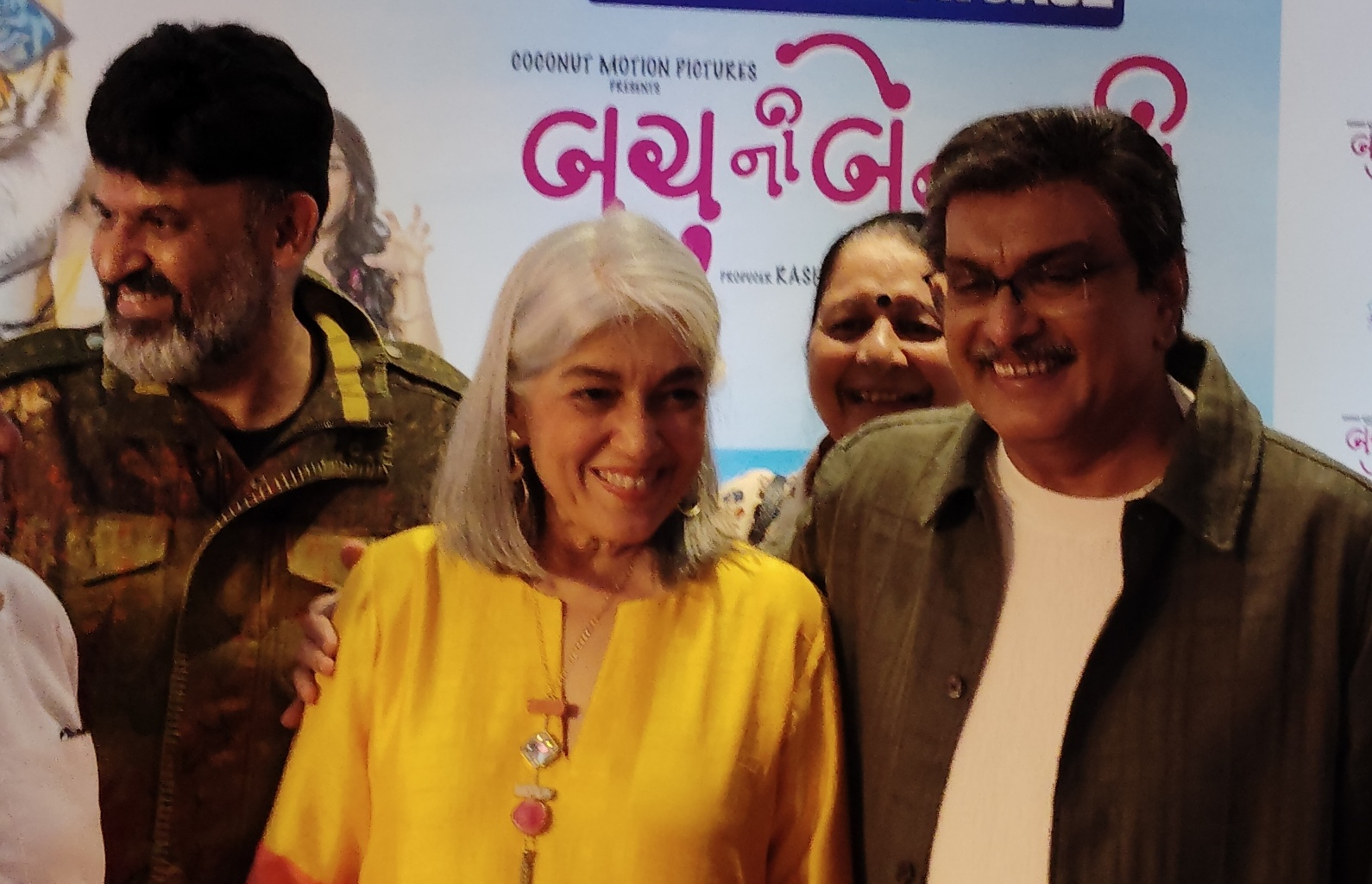
Producer Rashmin Majithia, Ratna Pathak and Siddharth Randeria

The film was written and directed by Vipul Mehta. Rashmin Majithia served as the producer. The music was composed by Siddharth Amit Bhavsar, with lyrics penned by Bhargav Purohit. Pratik Parmar was the cinematographer.

== Soundtrack ==
Bachu Ni Benpani

Soundtrack album by Siddharth Amit Bhavsar
- Released: 24 August 2025
- Genre: Feature film soundtrack
- Length: 8:28
- Language: Gujarati
- Label: Zen Music Gujarati
External audio
- 'Bachu Ni Benpani' songs Album on JioSaavn

All lyrics are written by Bhargav Purohit; all music is composed by Siddharth Amit Bhavsar.

Track listing
No.	Title	Singer(s)	Length
1.	"Havan Karaavo"	Amit Trivedi	2:37
2.	"Jaatra E Jaay"	Divya Kumar (singer) & Vrattini Purohit	3:05
3.	"Kharach Kharach"	Siddharth Amit Bhavsar & Prateeksha Srivastava	2:36

== Release ==
The trailer was released in early August 2025. It was released on 27 August 2025.

== Reception ==
Shilpa Bhanushali of Mid-Day Gujarati rated it 3.5 out of 5. She praised the performances, cinematography and direction.
