= Lapet =

2019 Gujarati family comedy drama film

- Official poster
- Directed by: Nishith Brambhatt
- Written by: Nishith Brambhatt
- Screenplay by: Manish Vaghela; Chirag Vyas
- Produced by: Apurva Joshi
- Starring: Nayan Shukla; Ketan Kumar Sagar; Vikee Shah; Bhakti Kubavat; Prashant Barot; Sharad Sharma; Kalyani Thakar; Jignesh Modi; Anand Devmani; Manish Vaghela; Mehul Maurya
- Cinematography: Dhruwal Patel
- Edited by: Nomen Pictures Pvt Ltd
- Music by: Akash Shah
- Production company: Apurva Joshi Entertainment
- Distributed by: Rupam Entertainment
- Release date: 15 February 2019
- Running time: 132 minutes
- Country: India
- Language: Gujarati

Lapet is a 2019 Gujarati family comedy-drama film directed by Nishith Brambhatt and produced by Apurva Joshi under the banner of Apurva Joshi Entertainment. The film has an ensemble of Nayan Shukla, Ketan Kumar Sagar, Vikee Shah, Bhakti Kubavat, Prashant Barot, Sharad Sharma, Kalyani Thakar, Jignesh Modi, Anand Devmani, Manish Vaghela and Mehul Maurya. The film was released by Rupam Entertainment Pvt Ltd on 15 February 2019.

== Cast ==
- Nayan Shukla as Chandrakant
- Ketan Kumar Sagar as ChandanSinh
- Vikee Shah as Chandu The Real Don
- Bhakti Kubavat as Mausam
- Prashant Barot as Bhanu Pratap
- Sharad Sharma as RudraPratap
- Kalyani Thakar as Madhu
- Jignesh Modi as Boss

== Production ==
The film was produced by Apurva Joshi from Apurva Joshi Entertainment. The Direction and story were by Nishith Brahmbhatt. Jigardan Gadhavi is music director of the film, Arvind Vegda has sung the title track of the film. The film was shot in Ahmedabad under the production of Apurva Joshi Entertainment.

== Release ==
The trailer and music of the film were released in public event on 12 January 2019 and on digital platform on 21 January 2019 on Shemaroo Entertainment. The film was released on 15 February 2019.
