= Best of Luck Laalu =

Best Of Luck Laalu
- Best Of Luck Laalu Official Poster
- Directed by: Vipul Mehta
- Written by: Amatya Goradia
- Produced by: Rashmin Majithia
- Starring: Smit Ganatra; Supriya Pathak; Muni Dilip Jha; Simran Natekar; Devarshi Trivedi; Rishabh Joshi
- Music by: Sachin–Jigar
- Production company: Coconut Motion Pictures
- Distributed by: Coconut Movies Release
- Release date: 27 October 2017
- Country: India
- Language: Gujarati

Best Of Luck Laalu, is a 2017 Gujarati drama film produced by Rashmin Majithia under the banner Coconut Motion Pictures and written and directed by Vipul Mehta. In the film, Smit Ganatra plays the role of a SSC student and Supriya Pathak Kapur (Daksha Modi) as his Mother. Music Director duo Sachin–Jigar has composed the film's score and songs.

The film was released in India on 27 October and was immediately declared a box office hit.

== Plot ==
The film travels around the life of Laalu, a SSC student. Amatya Modi (Laalu) is from a middle-class family and Amatya's mom wishes that Laalu, who is a grade ‘A’ student further pushes himself to secure a merit rank in the upcoming SSC board exams. The entire family— Laalu, Daksha and even Laalu's happy-go-lucky grandfather Haresh Bhai— rally around the clock the entire school year to fulfill his goal with all the conventional teenage distractions and pressures.

== Cast ==
- Smit Ganatra as Amatya Modi a.k.a. Laalu
- Supriya Pathak as Daksha Modi, Laalu's Mother.
- Muni Dilip Jha as Haresh Bhai, Laalu's Dadaji.
- Simran Natekar as Forum Shah
- Devarshi Trivedi as Sushil Sampat, Laalu's best friend
- Rishabh Joshi as Vicky Ganatra

== Soundtrack ==
Music Director duo Sachin–Jigar has composed the film's music with songs like ‘Nayan Ne Bandh Rakhi Ne’ sung by Sachin Sanghvi and lyrics by Niren Bhatt, ‘Luv U Luv U’ sung by Kirtidan Gadhvi, Shirley Setia & Sachin–Jigar.

Best Of Luck Laalu

Soundtrack album by Sachin–Jigar, Kirtidan Gadhvi & Shirley Setia
- Language: Gujarati
- Label: Zen Music Gujarati
External audio
- Album on JioSaavn

Track Listing
No.	Title	Lyrics	Music	Singer	Length
1.	"Luv U Luv U"	Vipul Mehta & Sachin Sanghvi	Sachin–Jigar	Kirtidan Gadhvi, Shirley Setia & Sachin–Jigar	4:20
2.	"Nayan Ne Bandh Rakhi Ne"	Niren Bhatt	Sachin–Jigar	Sachin Sanghvi	3:43
3.	"Dhasmas"	Niren Bhatt	Sachin–Jigar	Keerthi Sagathia, Sadhana Sargam & Sachin Sanghvi	3:55
4.	"Preet"	Niren Bhatt	Sachin–Jigar	Priya Saraiya, Divya Kumar & Sachin Sanghvi	3:46
Total length:					15:02
