= Kehvatlal Parivar =

2022 Indian film by Vipul Mehta

- Official US release poster
- Directed by: Vipul Mehta
- Written by: Vipul Mehta
- Produced by: Rashmin Majithia
- Starring: Siddharth Randeria; Supriya Pathak; Vandana Pathak; Sanjay Goradia; Bhavya Gandhi; Shraddha Dangar
- Cinematography: Rahul Negi
- Edited by: Jitendra K Shah
- Music by: Sachin–Jigar
- Production company: Coconut Motion Pictures
- Distributed by: Coconut Movies Release
- Release date: 6 May 2022
- Running time: 135 minutes
- Country: India
- Language: Gujarati

Kehvatlal Parivar (transl. Kehvatlal Family) is a 2022 Indian Gujarati comedy drama film written and directed by Vipul Mehta and produced by Rashmin Majithia under the banner Coconut Motion Pictures. It stars Siddharth Randeria, Supriya Pathak, Vandana Pathak, Sanjay Goradia, Bhavya Gandhi and Shraddha Dangar. The film was released on 6 May 2022 and was reviewed positively by critics and it became one of the highest-grossing film of Gujarati cinema.

== Cast ==
- Siddharth Randeria as Raju Bhai Thakar
- Supriya Pathak as Kalindi Thakar
- Vandana Pathak as Bhadra
- Sanjay Goradia as Shamu Thakar
- Bhavya Gandhi as Himesh Thakar
- Shraddha Dangar as Heta Thakar
- Neel Gagdani as Sam Thakar
- Aakash Zala as Natu
- Meghana Solanki as Falguni

Pratik Gandhi, Esha Kansara, Vyoma Nandi and Parth Oza performed cameos in "Holi Aavi Aavi" song.

== Plot ==
Kehvatlal Parivar is a fun-packed story of Raju Bhai Thakar (Siddharth Randeria) and his family. Raju Bhai is glued to his family values and is quite steady about following his old-fashioned/traditional ideas. He has Kehvats for every moment and situation. His son (Bhavya Gandhi) shares his modern and relevant business ideas and the daughter (Shraddha Dangar) has some interesting cooking recipes but Raju Bhai never allows them to experiment. His sister (Vandana Pathak) who is lazy, lives with Raju Bhai. She spends her time playing games and on social media. His cousin (Sanjay Goradia) adopts modern ideas and hence always challenges Rajubhai in business. Their life takes interesting turn when Raju Bhai's wife Kalindi (Supriya Pathak) returns in their house. Infused with laughter, Kehvatlal Parivar is a story of an extraordinarily crazy family who despite the difficulties and differences they always stick together.

== Production ==
The film is written and directed by Vipul Mehta. It is produced by Rashmin Majithia under the banner of Coconut Motion Pictures. It stars Siddharth Randeria, Supriya Pathak, Vandana Pathak, Sanjay Goradia, Bhavya Gandhi and Shraddha Dangar in lead roles.

== Soundtrack ==
Kehvatlal Parivar

Soundtrack album by Sachin–Jigar
- Released: 2 April 2022
- Genre: Feature film soundtrack
- Length: 16:41
- Language: Gujarati
- Label: Zen Music Gujarati
External audio
- Album on JioSaavn

All lyrics are written by Bhargav Purohit; all music is composed by Sachin–Jigar

Track listing
No.	Title	Singer(s)	Length
1.	"Utho Utho"	Aditya Gadhavi	3:15
2.	"Vahurani"	Falguni Pathak	3:35
3.	"Holi Aavi Aavi"	Divya Kumar, Bhoomi Trivedi, Madhubanti Bagchi, Tanishka Sanghvi, Hariom Gadhvi	4:02
4.	"Jode Tame Rahejo Raaj (Male Version)"	Sachet Tandon	3:05
5.	"Jode Tame Rahejo Raaj (Female Version)"	Priya Saraiya	2:44
Total length:			16:41

The songs were well received by the audience.

== Release ==
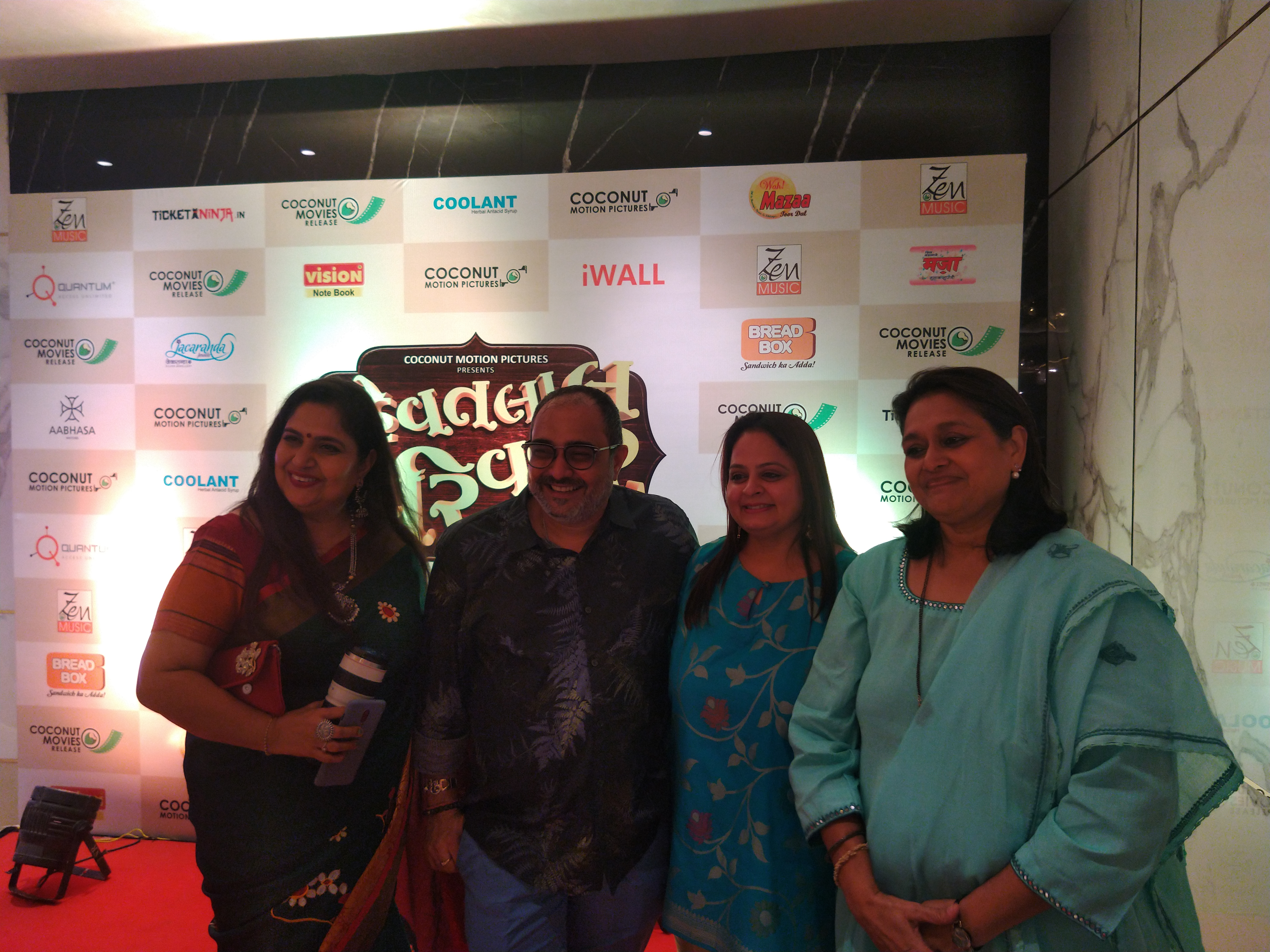
Vandana Pathak, Vipul Mehta, Supriya Pathak at premier of the film

The film was initially slated for release in January 2022. However, it was released on the 6 May 2022.

== Reception ==
Kehvatlal Parivar grossed ₹17.25 crore (US$1.8 million) on the box office. According to Box Office Mojo, the film earned $52,842 (₹4,500,000) in international markets. It was well received by the audience. It completed silver jubilee (50 weeks) in cinema and became one of the highest grossing Gujarati films.

Komal Nahta reviewed the film positively for its direction and performances. Keyur Seta writing for Cinestaan rated the film 3 out of 4. He praised the performances, direction, story, music and climax but criticised the reaction of the family when a dead member reappears. Parakh Bhatt of Sanj Samachar rated it 3.5 out of 5. He praised the performances of Randeria and Gandhi, music, comedy and choreography in songs. Gujarati Bhasha portal rated it 4 out of 5 but criticised the stuttering character of Goradia calling it cliché for evoking laughter. Carla Hay of Culture Mix praised performance, visuals and direction while criticising "mushy" sentimental moments and characters of Shamu and Natu "close to being shrieking caricatures".
