= Simran Natekar =

Indian television actress (born 1997)

- Born: 11 December 2002 (age 23); Mumbai, Maharashtra, India
- Known for: Longest running ad on smoking awareness
- Height: 5 ft 7 in (1.70 m)

Simran Natekar is an Indian television actress. She works in the Bollywood film and TV industry. Her career began with advertisements and she has over 150 Advertisements to her credit. Her first TV serial was Bandhan Saat Janamon Ka on Colors TV and her first major feature film was in Yash Raj Films's Daawat-e-Ishq. She starred in Best of Luck Laalu. She played supporting roles in Balika Vadhu and Laado 2.

== Early life ==
She was born in Surat on 11 December 2002.

== Career ==
She started acting at age 6 as a young girl in a No Smoking Ad awareness campaign, which made her popular in many countries. She then continued doing television ads and print shoots.

Her picture appears on Complan box. She is known for public awareness posters for the Mumbai Metro construction that appeared in Mumbai for almost 3 years while the Metro was laid out.

In 2011 she got a role in a serial for Star Plus named Ek Hazaaron Mein Meri Behna Hai in which she played the role of young Jeevika on Colors. She also did a cameo in The Suite Life of Karan & Kabir on Disney Channel as Shahana

In 2012, she appeared in the serial Tota Weds Maina.In 2013, she did the role of young Seeta in Devon ke Dev Mahadev and as Ruhi in Khauff on Life Ok.

Her movie Daawat-e-ishq was produced by Yash Raj films where she played Fareeda as Aditya Roy Kapoor's sister.

She has cameo's in Hatim, Krish3 and Dishkiyaoon and serials like Oye jassie ( as Minnie) and Palak Pe Jhalak for Disney .

In 2015, she played Pooja in Balika Vadhu and in 2016 she was selected for the role of Tanu In Ek Rishta Saajhedari Ka for Sony.

In 2017, Simran did Qaidi Band, Chakki and a lead role in Best of Luck Laalu (Gujarati film).

She also played Shivani in Pehredar Piya Ki during the same year.

She did a Kannada movie in 2018-2019 Berklee yet to be released as Female lead

She did Jaishree krishh gujarati movie as Jaishree in 2019 which released in 2023 as female lead.

She has played a bubbly character as Mili in Girls Hostel by TVF in season 1,2 and 3 on Sony Liv.

== Filmography ==
=== Television ===
Year	Serial	Role
2009	Bandhan Saat Janmo Ka	
2011–2012	Love U Zindagi	
2011–2012	Tota Weds Maina	
2011–2012	Ek Hazaaron Mein Meri Behna Hai	Young Jeevika
2011–2012	The Suite Life of Karan & Kabir	Shahana
2013	Devon Ke Dev...Mahadev	Young seeta
2013	Khauff	Ruhi
2013	Oye Jassie	Vinnie Roy
2014	Hatim	
2015	Balika Vadhu	Pooja
2016	Palak Pe Jhalak	
2016	Gumrah: End of Innocence	
2016	Ek Rishta Saajhedari Ka	Tanu
2017	Pehredaar Piya Ki	Shivani
2017	Laado 2	Chunki
2018	Internet Wala Love	Diya Varma
2018–2022	Girls Hostel	Mili
2021	Firsts (Dice Media) season 5	Avni
2025	Yaar Log	Ayesha

=== Films ===
Year	Film	Role
2010	Jaane Kahan Se Aayi Hai	Young Tara
2014	Krrish 3	Cameo
2014	Daawat-e-Ishq	Fareeda
2014	Dishkiyaoon	Young Meera
2017	Best of Luck Laalu	Forum Shah
2017	Qaidi Band	Minister's Daughter
2022	Chakki	Kiran
2023	Jaishree Krishh	Jaishree
TBA	Berklee	Kajal
