= Vipul Mehta (director) =

Indian film director and producer

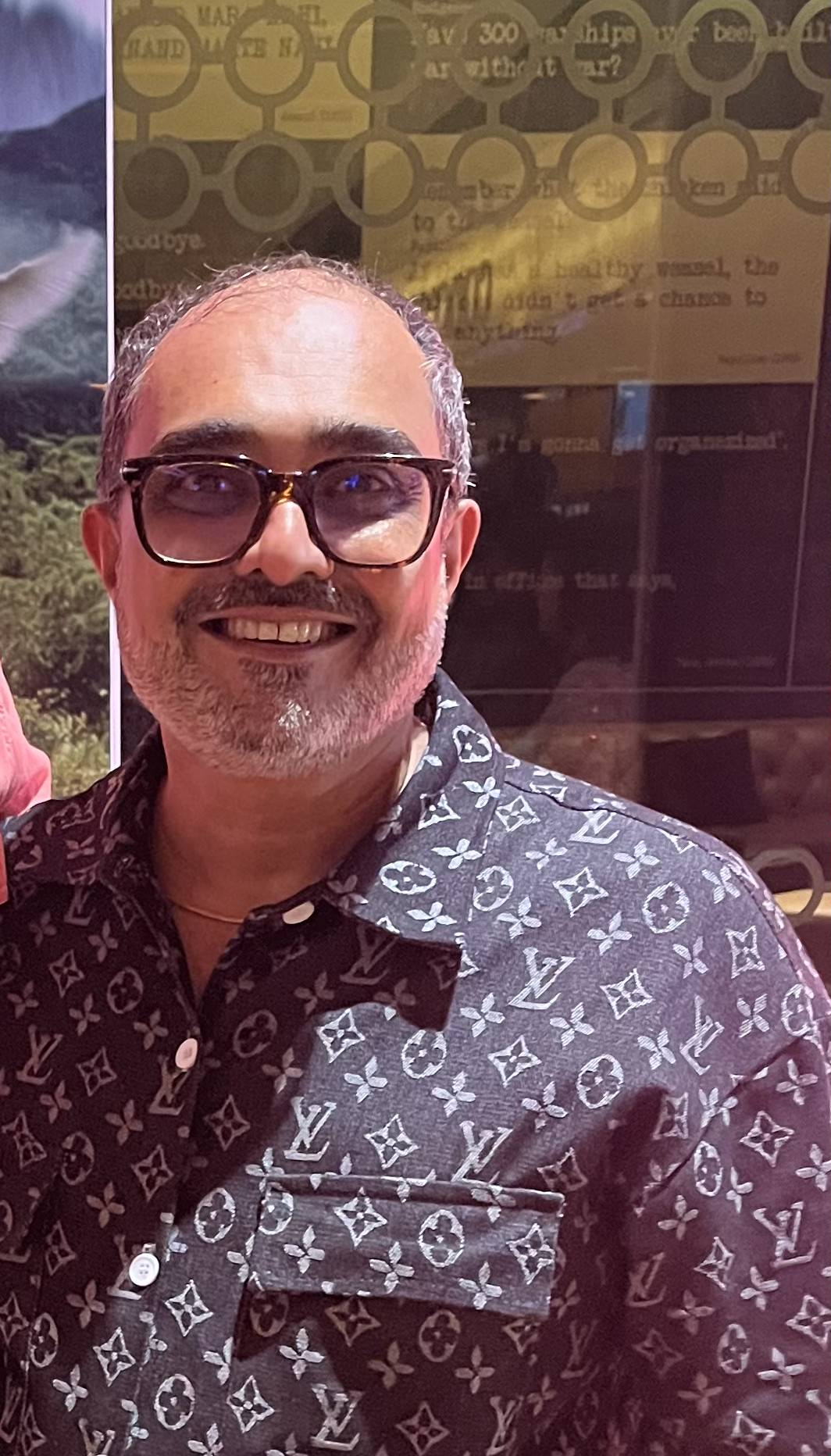
- Born: Mumbai, Maharashtra, India
- Occupations: Director; Screenwriter; Producer
- Years active: 2000-present
- Spouse: Tejal Mehta
- Children: Hitaarth Mehta

Vipul Mehta is an Indian screenwriter and film director who works in Hindi, Gujarati and Marathi-language films.

== Career ==
Mehta began his career in the Gujarati film industry. He has debuted as director with Carry On Kesar in 2017 directed notable Gujarati films such as Best of Luck Lalu and Chal Jeevi Laiye.

Mehta directed the Marathi film Ole Aale.

In 2023, Vipul Mehta made his Hindi debut with the film Kanjoos Makhichoos. In 2024, he co-wrote the film Maharaj.

== Personal life ==
Mehta is married and has a son.

== Filmography ==
=== Film ===
List of film credits
Year	Title	Director	Writer	Producer	Language
2014	Super Nani	No	Yes	No	Hindi
2017	Carry on Kesar	Yes	Yes	No	Gujarati
2017	Best of Luck Laalu	Yes	No	No	Gujarati
2019	Chaal Jeevi Laiye	Yes	Yes	No	Gujarati
2022	Kehvatlal Parivar	Yes	Yes	No	Gujarati
2023	Kanjoos Makhichoos	Yes	Yes	No	Hindi
2024	Ole Aale	Yes	Yes	No	Marathi
2024	Maharaj	No	Yes	No	Hindi
2025	Bachu Ni Benpani	Yes	Yes	No	Gujarati

=== Television ===
List of Television credits
Year	Title	Credited as	Original release	Production company	Produced by
2014	Itna Karo Na Mujhe Pyaar	Writer	Sony Entertainment Television	Balaji Telefilms	Ekta Kapoor; Shobha Kapoor
2011	Mukti Bandhan	Writer	Colors TV	Shobhna Desai Productions	Shobhana Desai
2009	Bayttaab Dil Kee Tamanna Hai	Writer	Sony Entertainment Television	Balaji Telefilms	Ekta Kapoor; Shobha Kapoor
2009	Meera	Writer	Imagine TV	Sagar Pictures	Sagar Pictures
2007	Kasturi	Writer	StarPlus	Balaji Telefilms	Ekta Kapoor; Shobha Kapoor
2007	Kuchh Is Tara	Writer	Sony Entertainment Television	Balaji Telefilms	Ekta Kapoor; Shobha Kapoor
2006	Kyaa Hoga Nimmo Kaa	Writer	Star Bharat	Balaji Telefilms	Ekta Kapoor; Shobha Kapoor
2005	Kkavyanjali	Writer	StarPlus	Balaji Telefilms	Ekta Kapoor; Shobha Kapoor
2002	Sanjivani	Writer	StarPlus	Cinevistaas Limited	Siddharth P. Malhotra
2000	Kyunki Saas Bhi Kabhi Bahu Thi	Writer	StarPlus	Balaji Telefilms	Ekta Kapoor; Shobha Kapoor
2000	Koshish – Ek Aashaa	Writer	Zee TV	Balaji Telefilms	Ekta Kapoor; Shobha Kapoor
