= Siddharth Randeria =

Indian actor

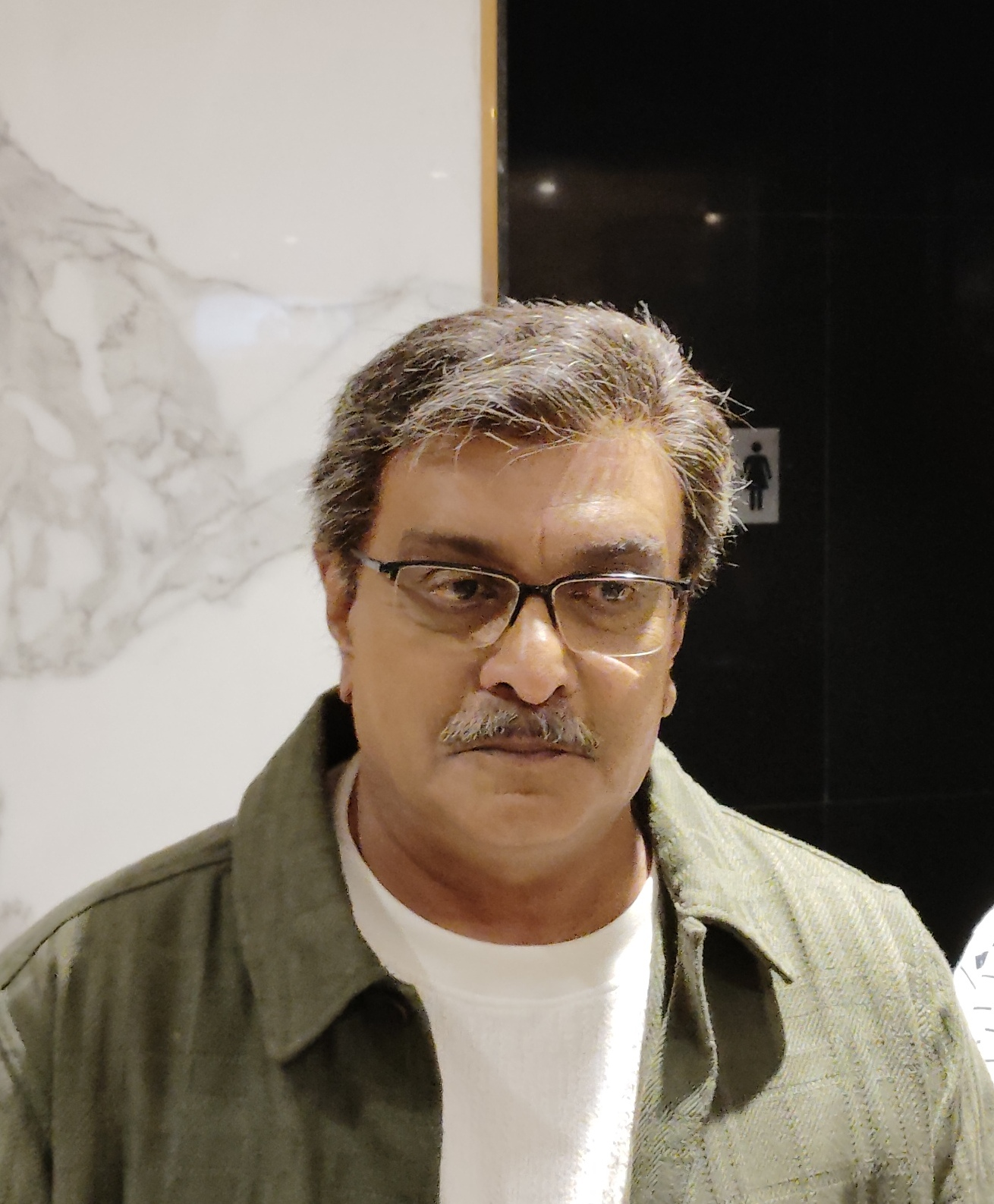
- Siddharth Randeria, 2025
- Born: 17 December 1955 (age 70); Mumbai, Maharashtra, India
- Occupations: Theatre and film actor
- Spouse: Shefali Randeria
- Children: 2

Siddharth Randeria is an Indian actor in Gujarati theatre and film.

== Biography ==
Siddharth Randeria was born on 17 December 1955 in Mumbai, lived in Surat, India to Gujarati writer and stage actor Madhukar Randeria. His son Ishaan Randeria is also associated with stage and cinema.

Siddharth is known for his Gujarati comedy plays for which he has won multiple awards as a writer, director and actor. He is involved in theatre since 1970 and performed as lead actor in many plays and over th last 50 years holds the record for the most live performances by an actor, crossing over 12,000 live performances till date. His Gujjubhai series started with Gujjubhai E Gaam Gajaavyu in 2002. Lage Raho Gujjubhai (2007) completed 800 shows in three years across the world, creating a new record on the Gujarati Stage. Other Gujjubhai plays; Gujjubhai E Gaam Gajavyu, Lo Gujjubhai Ghode Chadya, Gujjubhai ni Golmaal (2012) completed 350 shows across the world. His Gujjubhai Banya Dabangg has completed 505 shows in 18 months.

He debuted in Gujarati cinema in 2015 with his successful film Gujjubhai The Great. He also appeared its sequel, GujjuBhai - Most Wanted (2018). He played a cameo in Wrong Side Raju (2016). He played the lead role in Natsamrat (2018) which was a remake of 2016 Marathi film of the same name. His Chaal Jeevi Laiye! (2019) became the highest grossing Gujarati film of all time, breaking all previous records, running in theatres for over a year.

== Plays and films ==
=== Plays ===
- Gujjubhai series:
  - Gujjubhai E Gaam Gajavyu (2003)
  - Lage Raho Gujjubhai (2007)
  - Lo Gujjubhai Ghode Chadya (2010)
  - Gujjubhai ni Golmaal (2012)
  - Gujjubhai Banya Dabangg (2015)
  - Rang Rangila Gujjubhai (2017)
  - Bluffmaster Gujjubhai (2019)
- Aa Sansar Che Rang Rangilo
- Ajab Karamat
- Amari Duniya Tamari Duniya
- Amme Lai Gaya Tamme Rahi Gaya
- Bas Kar Bakula 2005
- Best of Luck
- Bhai
- Carry On Lalu
- Ek Soneri Sawar
- Gurubrahma
- Jaadu Teri Nazar
- Janma Daata
- Khandan
- Mantra Mugdh
- Mission East Pakistan
- Parnela Chaiye Kone Kahiye
- Pati Naame Patangiyu
- Prem No Public Issue
- Ramat Shooniya Chaukadini
- Rang Che Rajja
- Saatmi Dikri nu Saatmu Santan
- Sacha Bola Joothalal
- Shrimaan Virudh Shrimati
- Tu j Mari Mausam
- Vaat Bahaar Jay Nahi
- Chako Mako (This is theatre debut, where he played the lead role by INT)

=== Filmography ===
- Gujjubhai The Great (2015)
- Wrong Side Raju (2016, cameo)
- GujjuBhai - Most Wanted (2018)
- Natsamrat (2018)
- Chaal Jeevi Laiye! (2019)
- Kehvatlal Parivar (2022)
- Bushirt T-shirt (2023)
- Bachubhai (2023)
- Hu ane Tu (2023)
- Hurry Om Hurry (2023)
- Bachu Ni Benpani (2025)
- Jai Kanhaiyalall Ki (2026)

He has also appeared in some Bollywood films including Khalnayak, Kya Kehna, Shortkut and Satyaprem Ki Katha as well as in a number of TV serials such as Waqt Ki Raftar and Kudkudiya House No. 43.
