= Aarohi Patel =

Gujarati actress

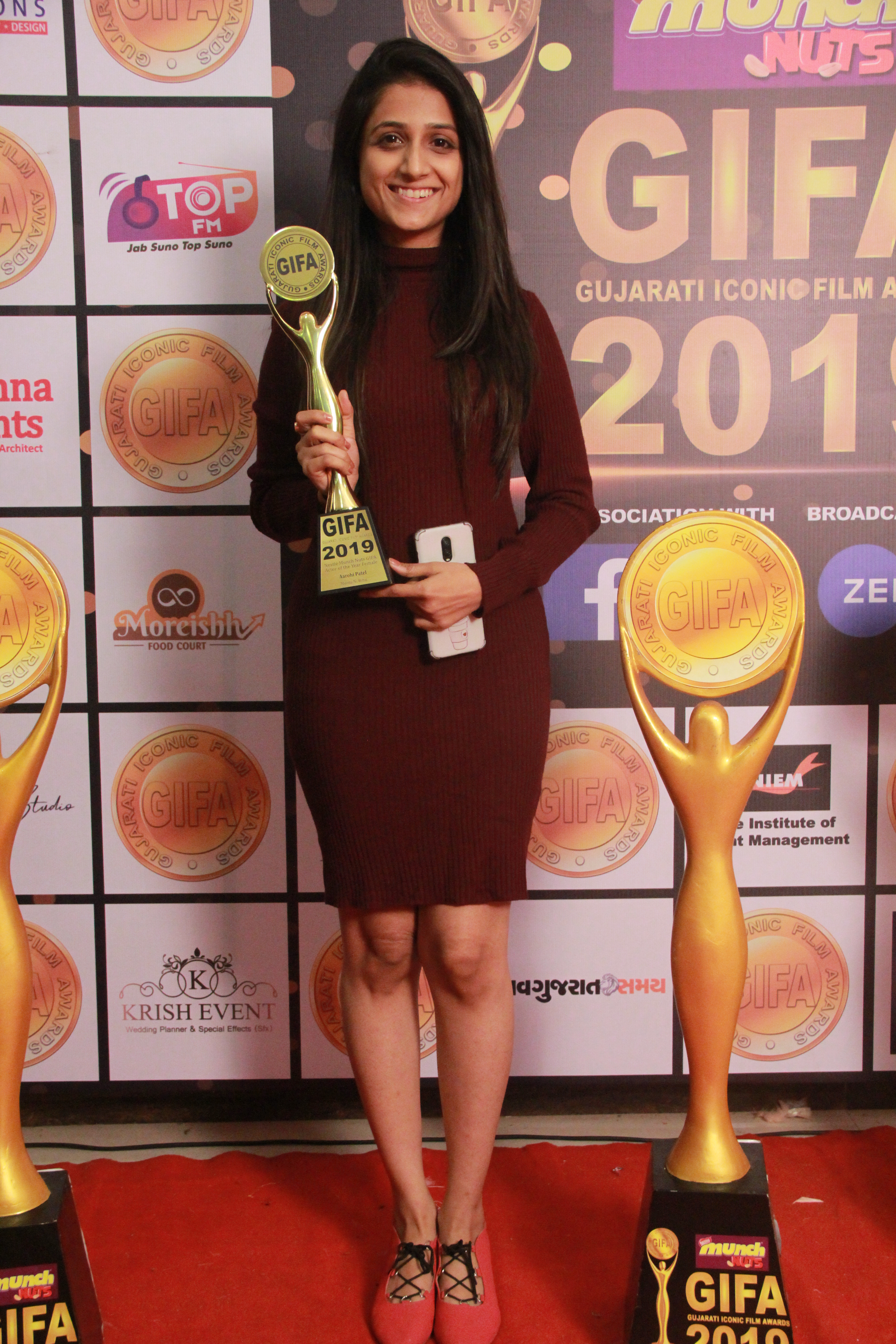
- Aarohi at GIFA award ceremony in 2019
- Born: Ahmedabad, Gujarat, India
- Education: Bachelor of Commerce from H.L. Institute of Commerce - Ahmedabad University , Master's in Development Communication from Gujarat University
- Occupation: Actress
- Years active: 2015–present
- Spouse: Tatsat Munshi

Aarohi Patel is an Indian actress known for her work in Gujarati films. She made her acting debut as a child artist in Saandeep Patel's Moti Na Chowk Re Sapna Ma Ditha. Her first leading role was in Vijaygiri Bava's drama film Premji: Rise of a Warrior, which won 10 prominent Gujarat State Awards, including Best Film. She is recognized for her performances in films such as Love Ni Bhavai, Chaal Jeevi Laiye, Aum Mangalam Singlem.

== Personal life ==
Aarohi was born into a Gujarati Hindu Family in Ahmedabad, Gujarat, India. Her mother Aarti Vyas Patel is also an actress. She completed her Bachelor's in Commerce, with specialization in Accounts from H.L. Institute of Commerce, Maharaja Sayajirao University of Baroda, also known as MSU, located in Vadodara, Gujarat, India.. Along with her bachelor studies, she did an internship at one of the Ahmedabad's popular radio stations 94.3 My FM from April 2012 till January 2014. She also did a two-month internship at TV9 Gujarati from April 2014 to June 2014. She got her first lead role in Premji: Rise of a Warrior while she was still in college. She did her post graduation in Development Communication from Gujarat University.

== Television ==
Year	Show	Role	Channel	Notes
2001	Sati Savitri	Young Savitri	SAB TV	4 episodes as a child artist

=== Web series ===
Year	Title	Role	Language
2019	Non-Alcoholic Breakup	Shaily	Gujarati
2021-22	Kadak Mitthi (Season 1-4)	Shivangi	Gujarati
2021	OK Boss	Megha	Gujarati

== Filmography ==
Year	Film	Role	Language	Notes
1999	Moti Na Chowk Re Sapna Ma Ditha	Pooja	Gujarati	Child Artist
2015	Premji: Rise of a Warrior	Pavan	Gujarati	
2017	Love Ni Bhavai	Antara	Gujarati	Award - Best Actress (2017) - Transmedia State Award for the Best Actress (2017)
2019	Chaal Jeevi Laiye!	Ketki	Gujarati	State Award for the Best Actress (2019)
2019	Montu Ni Bittu	Bittu	Gujarati	Award - Best Actress (2019) - GIFA
2022	Aum Mangalam Singlem	Vaani	Gujarati	State Award for the Best Actress (2022)
2024	Udan Chhoo	Kreena	Gujarati	
2024	Ajab Raat Ni Gajab Vaat	Pranali	Gujarati	
2025	Mithada Maheman	Komal	Gujarati	
2026	Lagan Laagii Re	Kavya	Gujarati	

== See also ==
- List of Gujarati film actresses
