= Sachin–Jigar =

Indian music composer duo

- Sachin Sanghvi (left) and Jigar Saraiya (right)

Background information
- Origin: Mumbai, Maharashtra, India
- Genres: Indian pop; electronic; folk; rock; hip-hop; jazz
- Occupations: Music composers; music producers; playback singers; music arrangers
- Years active: 2009–present
- Labels: YRF Music; Tips Music; Sony Music India; Eros Music; T-Series; Zee Music Company
- Members: Sachin Sanghvi; Jigar Saraiya

Sachin–Jigar are an Indian musician duo consisting of Sachin Sanghvi and Jigar Saraiya. They are known for their work in Hindi and Gujarati films. They have composed music for films such as F.A.L.T.U (2011), OMG – Oh My God! (2012), Shuddh Desi Romance (2013), ABCD: Any Body Can Dance (2013), Go Goa Gone (2013), Humpty Sharma Ki Dulhania (2014), Badlapur (2015), ABCD 2 (2015), Meri Pyaar Bindu (2017), Hindi Medium (2017), A Gentleman (2017), Stree (2018), Gold (2018), Arjun Patiala (2019), Made in China (2019), Angrezi Medium (2019), Chandigarh Kare Aashiqui (2021), Bhoot Police (2021), Bhediya (2022), Govinda Naam Mera (2022), Zara Hatke Zara Bachke (2023), Stree 2 (2024), Munjya (2024), Vicky Vidya Ka Woh Wala Video (2024), Param Sundari (2025), Maalik (2025), and Thamma (2025).

== Personal life ==
Sachin Sanghvi and Jigar Saraiya hail from Gujarat, India. They are currently both based in Mumbai, Maharashtra, India. Jigar Saraiya is married to singer and lyricist Priya Saraiya. Sachin's daughter, Taniskha Sanghvi, is also a singer.

In October 2025, Sachin was arrested by the Mumbai Police following allegations of sexual assault made by a woman in her late 20s. The complainant stated that Sanghvi had contacted her through social media in 2024 and promised her work on a music album and marriage. A first information report was filed, and he was subsequently arrested later that month. Sanghvi was released on bail shortly thereafter.

== Career ==
Prior to working with each other, they both were long-time assistants to Rajesh Roshan and Pritam and programmed and arranged music for several composers, including A. R. Rahman, Vishal–Shekhar, Nadeem–Shravan, Sandesh Shandilya, and Anu Malik.

Jigar had met Sachin through Amit Trivedi while serving as an assistant to Pritam, who suggested that they work together. In 2009, they composed a song for the film Life Partner as guest composers. They were recommended by Pritam to compose the soundtrack for F.A.L.T.U (2011), directed by Remo D'Souza.

In the following years, they composed music for films such as OMG – Oh My God! (2012), Tere Naal Love Ho Gaya (2012), Kyaa Super Kool Hain Hum (2012), Ajab Gazabb Love (2012), ABCD: Any Body Can Dance (2013), Shuddh Desi Romance (2013), Jayantabhai Ki Luv Story (2013), Himmatwala (2013), I, Me Aur Main (2013), Go Goa Gone (2013) and Ramaiya Vastavaiya (2013).

In 2018, they founded White Noise Studios, a music production company which aims to launch new talent and offer them opportunities in the music industry.

== Discography ==
=== As composers ===
==== Hindi films ====
Year	Film	Lyricist(s)	Notes
2009	Life Partner	Javed Akhtar	One song
2009	Teree Sang	Sameer	Five songs
2011	Shor in the City	Sameer	Three songs
2011	Hum Tum Shabana	Sameer, Priya Saraiya	
2011	F.A.L.T.U	Sameer	
2012	Tere Naal Love Ho Gaya	Priya Saraiya, Mayur Puri	
2012	Kyaa Super Kool Hain Hum	Mayur Puri	One song
2012	OMG – Oh My God!	Swanand Kirkire	One song
2012	Ajab Gazabb Love	Priya Saraiya	One song
2013	ABCD: Any Body Can Dance	Mayur Puri, Priya Saraiya	
2013	Jayantabhai Ki Luv Story	Mayur Puri, Priya Saraiya	
2013	I, Me Aur Main	Kausar Munir, Neelesh Misra, Mayur Puri	Three songs
2013	Himmatwala	Mayur Puri	One song
2013	Go Goa Gone	Priya Saraiya, Amitabh Bhattacharya	
2013	Ramaiya Vastavaiya	Priya Saraiya	
2013	Issaq	Mayur Puri	Three songs
2013	Shuddh Desi Romance	Jaideep Sahni	
2014	Humpty Sharma Ki Dulhania	Irshad Kamil, Shashank Khaitan	Three songs
2014	Entertainment	Mayur Puri, Priya Saraiya, Ashish Pandit	
2014	Happy Ending	Amitabh Bhattacharya, Priya Saraiya, Ashish Pandit	
2014	Ungli	Amitabh Bhattacharya	One song
2015	Badlapur	Priya Saraiya, Dinesh Vijan	
2015	ABCD 2	Mayur Puri, Priya Saraiya, Rimi Nique, Badshah	
2015	Hero	Niranjan Iyengar	Two songs
2016	A Flying Jatt	Vayu Shrivastav, Priya Saraiya, Mayur Puri	
2017	Meri Pyaari Bindu	Kausar Munir, Priya Saraiya	
2017	Hindi Medium	Priya Saraiya, Kumaar	Two songs
2017	Raabta	–	Background score only
2017	A Gentleman	Vayu Shrivastav, Priya Saraiya	
2017	Simran	Vayu Shrivastav, Priya Saraiya	
2017	Bhoomi	Priya Saraiya, Anvita Dutt, Vayu Shrivastav, Utkarsh Naithani	Seven songs
2017	Haseena Parkar	Priya Saraiya, Vayu Shrivastav	
2018	Parmanu	Vayu Shrivastav, Sachin Sanghvi, Kumar Vishwas	Five songs
2018	Gold	Vayu Shrivastav, Javed Akhtar	Five songs
2018	Stree	Vayu Shrivastav, Badshah, Jigar Saraiya	
2019	Arjun Patiala	Guru Randhawa, Priya Saraiya	Four songs (Two with Guru Randhawa)
2019	Made in China	Vayu Shrivastav, Jigar Saraiya, Priya Saraiya, Niren Bhatt	
2019	Bala	Mellow D, Badshah, Priya Saraiya, Jigar Saraiya, Bhargav Purohit	Four songs
2020	Street Dancer 3D	Priya Saraiya, Guru Randhawa, Jigar Saraiya, Millind Gaba, Asil Gold, Bhargav Purohit, Vayu Shrivastav, IP Singh	Six songs (One with Guru Randhawa)
2020	Angrezi Medium	Jigar Saraiya, Priya Saraiya	Three songs
2020	Shakuntala Devi	Vayu Shrivastav, Priya Saraiya	
2021	Roohi	Amitabh Bhattacharya, IP Singh, Priya Saraiya	
2021	Bhoot Police	Kumaar, Priya Saraiya	
2021	Shiddat	Kausar Munir, Priya Saraiya	Two songs
2021	Hum Do Hamare Do	Shellee	
2021	Chandigarh Kare Aashiqui	IP Singh, Priya Saraiya, Vayu Shrivastav	Seven songs
2022	Dasvi	Amitabh Bhattacharya, Ashish Pandit	
2022	Bhediya	Amitabh Bhattacharya	
2022	Govinda Naam Mera	Vayu Shrivastav	One song
2023	Zara Hatke Zara Bachke	Amitabh Bhattacharya	
2023	Jaane Jaan	Rajendra Krishan, Priya Saraiya	
2023	Farrey	Jigar Saraiya, Mellow D, Abhishek Dubey, MC Stan	
2023	Aankh Micholi	Jigar Saraiya, Priya Saraiya, Vayu Shrivastav, IP Singh	
2023	Kho Gaye Hum Kahan	Ankur Tewari	One song
2024	Teri Baaton Mein Aisa Uljha Jiya	Indraneel	One song
2024	Munjya	Amitabh Bhattacharya	
2024	Murder Mubarak	Priya Saraiya	
2024	Stree 2	Amitabh Bhattacharya	
2024	Kahan Shuru Kahan Khatam	Kausar Munir	Two songs
2024	Vicky Vidya Ka Woh Wala Video	Priya Saraiya, Irshad Kamil, Vayu Shrivastav	All songs (Three with White Noise Collectives)
2025	Nadaaniyan	Amitabh Bhattacharya	
2025	Jewel Thief	Kumaar	One song
2025	Maalik	Amitabh Bhattacharya	
2025	Param Sundari	Amitabh Bhattacharya	
2025	Thamma	Amitabh Bhattacharya	
2026	Chand Mera Dil	Amitabh Bhattacharya	
2026	Udta Teer	Amitabh Bhattacharya	
2026	King †	Kumaar, Ed Sheeran	

==== Other language films ====
Year	Film	Language	Notes
2006	Golmaal	Marathi	Background score only
2013	D for Dopidi	Telugu	
2014	Bey Yaar	Gujarati	
2016	Wrong Side Raju	Gujarati	
2017	Chor Bani Thangaat Kare	Gujarati	
2017	Best of Luck Laalu	Gujarati	
2017	Love Ni Bhavai	Gujarati	
2019	Chaal Jeevi Laiye!	Gujarati	
2022	Kehvatlal Parivar	Gujarati	
2022	Aum Mangalam Singlem	Gujarati	
2023	Kutch Express	Gujarati	
2024	Ole Aale	Marathi	
2025	Mom Tane Nai Samjay	Gujarati	

=== Television ===
Year	Film	Notes
2004	Main Banoongi Miss India	Composed by Sachin Sanghvi; Television series
2019-2021	The Family Man	Web series
2023	Farzi	Web series; 2 Songs

=== Short film ===
Year	Film	Notes
2003	Right Here, Right Now	Composed by Sachin Sangvhi; Short film

== Songs sung by Jigar Saraiya ==
Year	Song	Film	Notes
2009	Morey Saiyan	Teree Sang	
2009	Rab Milaya	Teree Sang	
2009	Mere Naal	Do Knot Disturb	
2010	Lau Jali	Krantiveer: The Revolution	
2011	Awaaz	F.A.L.T.U	
2011	Nayee Subah	F.A.L.T.U	
2011	O Teri	F.A.L.T.U	
2011	Beh Chala	F.A.L.T.U	
2011	Bhoot Aaya	F.A.L.T.U	
2011	Piya Kesariyo	Hum Tum Shabana	
2013	Chandu Ki Girl Friend	ABCD: Any Body Can Dance	
2013	Sorry Sorry	ABCD: Any Body Can Dance	
2013	Slowly Slowly	Go Goa Gone	
2013	Babaji Ki Booti	Go Goa Gone	
2013	I Keel Ded Peepul (Boris Mix)	Go Goa Gone	
2013	Gulabi	Shuddh Desi Romance	
2014	Johnny Johnny	Entertainment	
2014	Paaji Tussi Such A Pussy Cat	Happy Ending	
2015	Happy B'day	ABCD 2	
2021	Chandigarh Kare Aashiqui	Chandigarh Kare Aashiqui	
2022	Baaki Sab Theek	Bhediya	
2023	Paisa Hai Toh	Farzi	Also lyricist

== Songs sung by Sachin Sanghvi ==
Year	Song	Film	Comments
2013	Thoda Thoda	Jayantabhai Ki Luv Story	
2015	Happy B’Day	ABCD 2	
2016	Beat Pe Booty	A Flying Jatt	
2017	Bhuli Javu Che	Chor Bani Thangaat Kare	Gujarati film
2017	Yaad Chhe	Chor Bani Thangaat Kare	Gujarati film
2017	Kho Diya	Bhoomi	
2019	Chaand Ne Kaho	Chaal Jeevi Laiye	Gujarati song
2019	Dhuni Re Dhakhavi	–	
2019	Radha Ne Shyam Mali Jashe	–	Gujarati song; sung alongside Shruti Pathak
2021	Chandigarh Kare Aashiqui	Chandigarh Kare Aashiqui	
2022	Baaki Sab Theek	Bhediya	
2023	Paisa Hai Toh	Farzi	Web series

== Awards and nominations ==
Year	Category	Nominated Song	Film	Result	Ref(s)
Mirchi Music Awards
2015	Music Composer of The Year	"Chunar"	ABCD 2	Nominated	
2015	Best Background Score	-	ABCD 2	Nominated	
2015	Album of The Year	-	ABCD 2	Nominated	
2015	Album of The Year	-	Badlapur	Nominated	
2015	Best Song Producer (Programming & Arranging)	"Jee Karda"	Badlapur	Nominated	
2017	Best Song Producer (Programming & Arranging)	"Haareya"	Meri Pyaari Bindu	Nominated	
2017	Music Composer of The Year	"Maana Ke Hum Yaar Nahin (Duet)"	Meri Pyaari Bindu	Nominated	
2017	Music Composer of The Year	"Hoor"	Hindi Medium	Nominated	
