= Madhavaram =

Madhavaram may refer to:

== Places in South India ==
=== Andhra Pradesh ===
- Madhavaram (East), a village in A. Konduru mandal, NTR district
- Madhavaram (West), a village in A. Konduru mandal, NTR district
- Madhavaram, Annamayya, a village in Rayachoti Taluk, Annamayya district
- Madhavaram, Eluru, a village in Kukkunoor Taluk, Eluru district
- Madhavaram, Kadapa, a village in Vontimitta Taluk, Kadapa district
- Madhavaram, Kurnool, a village in Mantralayam Taluk, Kurnool district
- Madhavaram, Mudinepalle, a village in Mudinepalli Taluk, Krishna district
- Madhavaram, Nandyal, a village in Peapally Taluk, Nandyal district
- Madhavaram, Prakasam, a village in Thallur Taluk, Prakasam district
- Madhavaram, Thavanampalle, a village in Thavanampalle Taluk, Chittoor district
- Madhavaram, Yadamari, a village in Yadamarri Taluk, Chittoor district
- Madhavaram, West Godavari, a village in Tadepalligudem mandal, West Godavari district
- Cheruvu Madhavaram, a village in G. Konduru mandal, Krishna district

=== Tamil Nadu ===
- Madhavaram, Chennai, is a part of north of Chennai, Tamil Nadu, India.
  - Madhavaram taluk, a subdistrict of Chennai
  - Madhavaram Botanical Garden
  - Madhavaram Milk Colony
  - Madhavaram Inter-city Bus Terminus
  - Madhavaram Depot metro station
  - Madhavaram Junction, bridge
  - Madhavaram Lake
  - Madhavaram (state assembly constituency)
- Madhavaram, Gummidipoondi, a village in Gummidipoondi Taluk, Thiruvallur district
- Madhavaram, Ponneri, a village in Ponneri Taluk, Thiruvallur district

=== Telangana ===
- Madhavaram, Telangana, a village in Munagala Taluk, Suryapeta district

== People ==
- Madhavaram Krishna Rao, Indian politician

== See also ==
- Madhava (disambiguation)
- Ram (disambiguation)
