= Madhava =

Mādhava means Krishna. It may also refer to:

- a Sanskrit patronymic, "descendant of Madhu (a man of the Yadu tribe)".
  - especially of Krishna, see Madhava (Vishnu)
    - an icon of Krishna
  - Madhava of Sangamagrama, fourteenth-century Indian mathematician
  - Madhvacharya, philosopher in the Vaishnavism tradition
  - Madhava Vidyaranya, Advaita saint and brother of Sayana
  - Venkata Madhava, 10th to 12th century commentator of the Rigveda
  - Madhavdeva, 16th-century proponent of Ekasarana dharma, neo-Vaishnavism of Assam
- relating to springtime; the first month of spring, see Chaitra
- Madhava or Madhava-kara, an Indian physician of the 7th or early 8th century
- Madhava Vagata Srinivas, a staunch srivaishnava preacher and philosper
- Madhava, titular protagonist of the ancient Indian drama Mālatīmādhava by Bhavabhuti
- Madhava, a character in the 11th-century Indian story collection Shringara-manjari-katha

== See also ==
- Madhavan (disambiguation)
- Madhavi (disambiguation)
- Madhab (disambiguation)
- Madhavaram (disambiguation)
- Madhav (film), 2022 Indian film
- Magha (month) (ruled by Madhava)
