= Madhavan =

Madhavan may refer to:

== People ==
- James Madhavan (died 1973), Fijian politician
- Kavya Madhavan (born 1985), Indian actress
- Mahesh Madhavan (born 1963/64), Indian businessman, CEO of Bacardi
- N. S. Madhavan (born 1948), Indian writer
- O. Madhavan (1922–2005), Indian actor and director
- R. Madhavan (born 1970), Indian Tamil and Hindi actor
- Rakesh Madhavan (born 1977), Malaysian cricketer
- S. Madhavan (1933-2018), Indian politician and Member of the Legislative Assembly of Tamil Nadu
- Santosh Madhavan (1960-2024), Indian Godman under the name of Amritha Chaithanya
- Vijay Madhavan, Indian classical dancer

== Other uses ==
- Madhavan, Iran, a village

== See also ==
- Meesa Madhavan, a 2002 Malayalam film by Lal Jose
- Middle Class Madhavan, a 2001 Tamil film by T. P. Gajendran
- Madhava (disambiguation)
