= Madhavi =

Madhavi may refer to:

- Goddess Radha, consort of Krishna/Madhava
- Goddess Lakshmi, consort of Vishnu/Madhava
- Madhavi (princess), daughter of King Yayati in Hindu mythology
- Madhavi (Silappatikaram), a character in the ancient Tamil epic Cilappatikaram
- Madhavi Deva, a character in the Indian film series Saheb, Biwi Aur Gangster, played by Mahie Gill
- Maadhavi (actress), Indian film actress
- Madhavi Krishnan (chemist), British-Indian chemist
- Madhavi Mudgal, Indian classical dancer (Odissi)
- Madhavi Sardesai, Indian academical
- Madhavi (play), a 1982 Indian play by Bhisham Sahni
- Madhavi (TV series), an Indian Tamil-language soap opera that aired on Sun TV from 2009 to 2011
- Madhavi Aatmaram Bhide, a fictional character in Taarak Mehta Ka Ooltah Chashmah

== See also ==
- Madhava (disambiguation)
