= Madhavaram, West Godavari =

Madhavaram
- Village
- Interactive map of Madhavaram
- Location in Andhra Pradesh, India
- Coordinates: 16.891°N 81.590°E
- Country: India
- State: Andhra Pradesh
- District: West Godavari

Population (2011)
  - Total: 6,509

Languages
  - Official: Telugu
- Time zone: UTC+5:30 (IST)

Other uses, see Madhavaram (disambiguation)

Madhavaram is a village in West Godavari District of Andhra Pradesh, India. It is located approximately 12 km from Tadepalligudem, its mandal town. People from surrounding villages call this village as Military Madhavaram because, at least one person from every family in this village has worked or is working in military. Around 1200 members from this village participated in first and second world wars. Around 91 soldiers died in these wars. Joining the military is an ambition for every youth in this village. Most of the soldiers from the village belong to the Kapu community.

== Etymology ==
It has been noted that the Zamindar of Nuzvid gifted the village to one of his fierce soldiers, Vempalli Madhav Rao. From then on, the village came to be called Madhavaram. And, with many men from the village joining the military, it is also known by the sobriquet 'Military Madhavaram'.

== Demographics ==
As of the 2011 Census of India, Madhavaram had a population of 6509. The total population constitute, 3212 males and 3297 females with a sex ratio of 1026 females per 1000 males. 653 children are in the age group of 0–6 years, with sex ratio of 1093. The average literacy rate stands at 70.70%.

== Economy ==
Agriculture is another important employment in this village. Paddy and Sugarcane,maize are important crops.

== Culture ==
All South Indian festivals are celebrated in Madhavaram. Particularly Polleramma Jathara is celebrated with much religious fervour. People come to Poleramma Jathara from surrounding villages and also from neighbouring state of Karnataka.

Temples

A temple for Poleramma, Sri Shiva temple, Sri Venkateswara temple, Sri Kumaraswamy temple, a Vaishanava temple and Sri Kothula Gunta Hanuman temple exist in Madhavaram. Poleramma temple of Madhavaram is famous among the near by villages.

== Education ==
Madhavaram has a Government primary school, a ZP High school, a Government Junior college. There is a private school in Madhavaram.

== Transport ==
APSRTC runs buses from Tadepalligudem to Madhavaram. Nearest railway station is also in Tadepalligudem and Nidadavole.
