= Madhavaram, Eluru =

Madhavaram
- village
- Interactive map of Madhavaram
- Location in Andhra Pradesh, India
- Coordinates: 17.601965611093554°N 81.08993001955078°E
- Country: India
- State: Andhra Pradesh
- District: Eluru

Government
  - Body: Village Panchayat

Population
  - Total: 1,064

Languages
  - Official: Telugu
- Time zone: UTC+5:30 (IST)
- ISO 3166 code: IN-AP
- Vehicle registration: AP
- Nearest city: Eluru
- Website: ap.gov.in

Other uses, see Madhavaram (disambiguation)

Madhavaram, is a village in Kukkunoor Taluk of Eluru district of the Indian state of Andhra Pradesh. It was in Khammam district, until the formation of Telangana state on 2 June 2014.

== Demographics ==
Total Number of Household : 274
Population	Persons	Males	Females
Total	1,064	633	431
In the age group 0–6 years	103	49	54
Scheduled Castes (SC)	152	69	83
Scheduled Tribes (ST)	521	371	150
Literates	635	456	179
Illiterate	429	177	252
Total Worker	574	291	283
Main Worker	534	276	258
Main Worker - Cultivator	98	57	41
Main Worker - Agricultural Labourers	402	194	208
Main Worker - Household Industries	4	4	0
Main Worker - Other	30	21	9
Marginal Worker	40	15	25
Marginal Worker - Cultivator	1	0	1
Marginal Worker - Agriculture Labourers	21	12	9
Marginal Worker - Household Industries	1	0	1
Marginal Workers - Other	17	3	14
Marginal Worker (3-6 Months)	34	13	21
Marginal Worker - Cultivator (3-6 Months)	1	0	1
Marginal Worker - Agriculture Labourers (3-6 Months)	20	11	9
Marginal Worker - Household Industries (3-6 Months)	0	0	0
Marginal Worker - Other (3-6 Months)	13	2	11
Marginal Worker (0-3 Months)	6	2	4
Marginal Worker - Cultivator (0-3 Months)	0	0	0
Marginal Worker - Agriculture Labourers (0-3 Months)	1	1	0
Marginal Worker - Household Industries (0-3 Months)	1	0	1
Marginal Worker - Other Workers (0-3 Months)	4	1	3
Non Worker	490	342	148
