= Sonu Tane Mara Par Bharoso Nai Ke =

2022 film directed by Henil Gandhi

- Directed by: Henil Gandhi
- Written by: Suraj Baraliya
- Produced by: Jeegar Chauhan; Sunny Desai
- Starring: Malhar Thakar; Nijal Modi; Kalpana Gargekar; Ragi Jani
- Cinematography: Himanshu Dubey
- Music by: Rahul Munjariya
- Production company: Jeegar Chauhan Productions
- Distributed by: Rupam Entertainment Pvt Ltd
- Release date: 19 May 2022
- Running time: 125 minutes
- Country: India
- Language: Gujarati

Sonu Tane Mara Par Bharoso Nai Ke is a 2022 Gujarati comedy, film directed by Henil Gandhi and written by Suraj Baraliya. It stars Malhar Thakar, Nijal Modi, Ragi Jani, Kalpana Gargekar, and others. It was produced by Jeegar Chauhan. & Sunny Desai. The film was distributed by Rupam Entertainment Pvt Ltd. The music of the film was arranged by Rahul Munjariya

== Plot ==
Kartik who belongs to a middle-class family buys a television from Chor Bazar which turns out to be defective. In his attempt to repair the television, Kartik finds gold coins in it. He hands over the gold to the Police and earns 10% commission for his honesty. Things take a hilarious turn, when the smuggler of the gold coins reaches Kartik's house. How would Kartik handle this situation? Would the smuggler get his gold coins back?

== Cast ==
- Malhar Thakar
- Nijal Modi
- Ragi Jani
- Kalpana Gagdekar
- Jayesh More
- Meghna Solanki
- RJ Hiren Barot
- Rajpal Vaghela
- Dolly Trivedi
- Bansi Rajput

== Production ==
The movie was produced by Jeegar Chauhan, Malhar Thakar & Sunny Desai under the banner of Jeegar Chauhan Productions The music of the film was arranged by Rahul Munjariya. Daler Mehndi had his Gujarati film debut in the movie. Altaf Raja also made his Gujarati film debut in the movie.

== Reception ==
OTTplay praised the film direction but not the acting.

== Release ==
The film was released in cinemas on May 19, 2022.

== See also ==
- List of Gujarati films of 2022
