= Madhava (Vishnu) =

Epithet of Hindu god Vishnu and Krishna

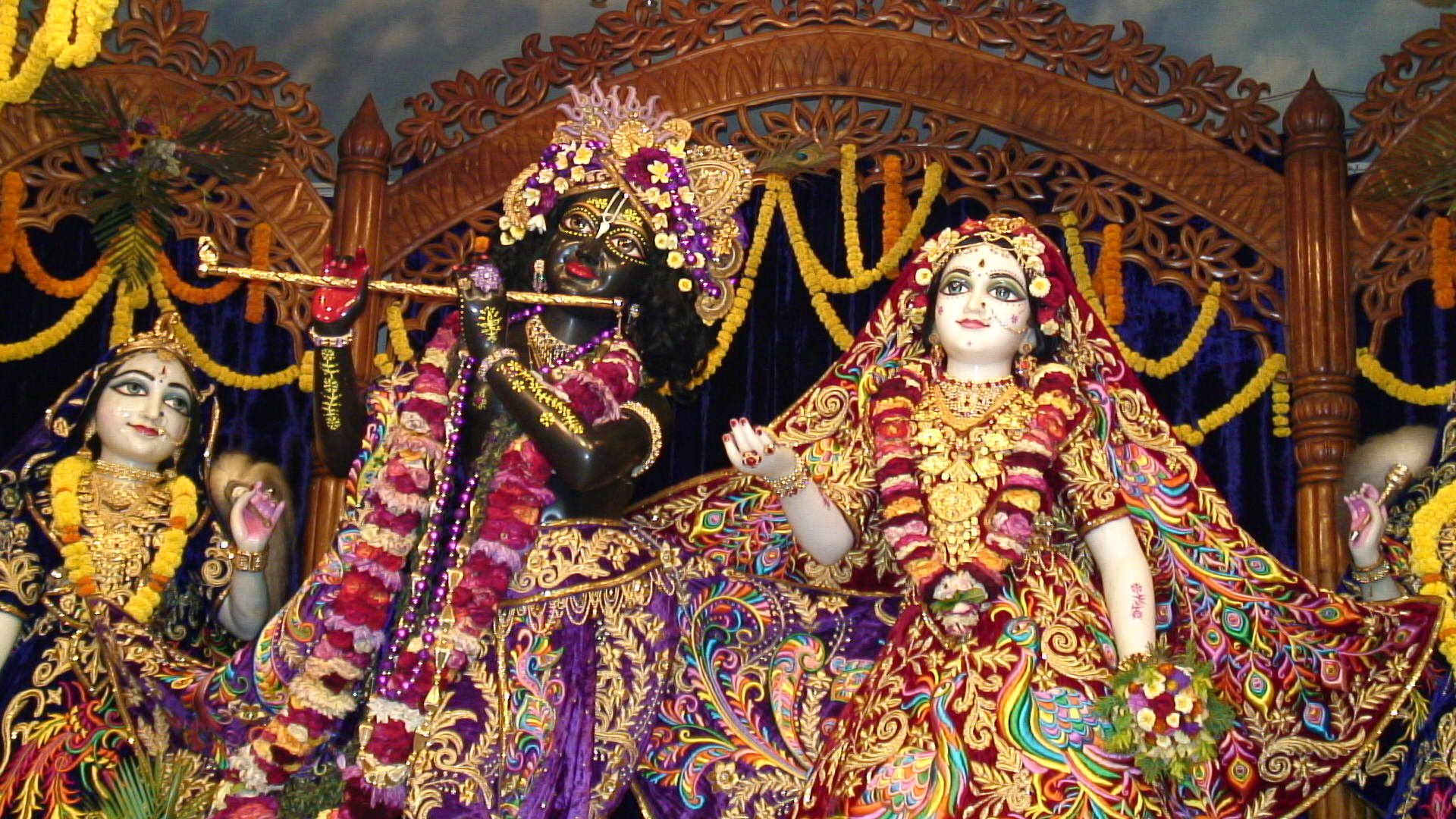
Krishna worshiped as Madhava with his chief consort, Radha, at ISKCON Mayapur

Madhava (Sanskrit: माधव, IAST: Mādhava) is one of the primary epithets of Vishnu or Krishna. The word Mādhava in Sanskrit is a vṛddhi derivation of the word Madhu (Sanskrit: मधु), which means honey. It is a title of Krishna, referring to his lineage as 'he who appeared the Madhu dynasty'.

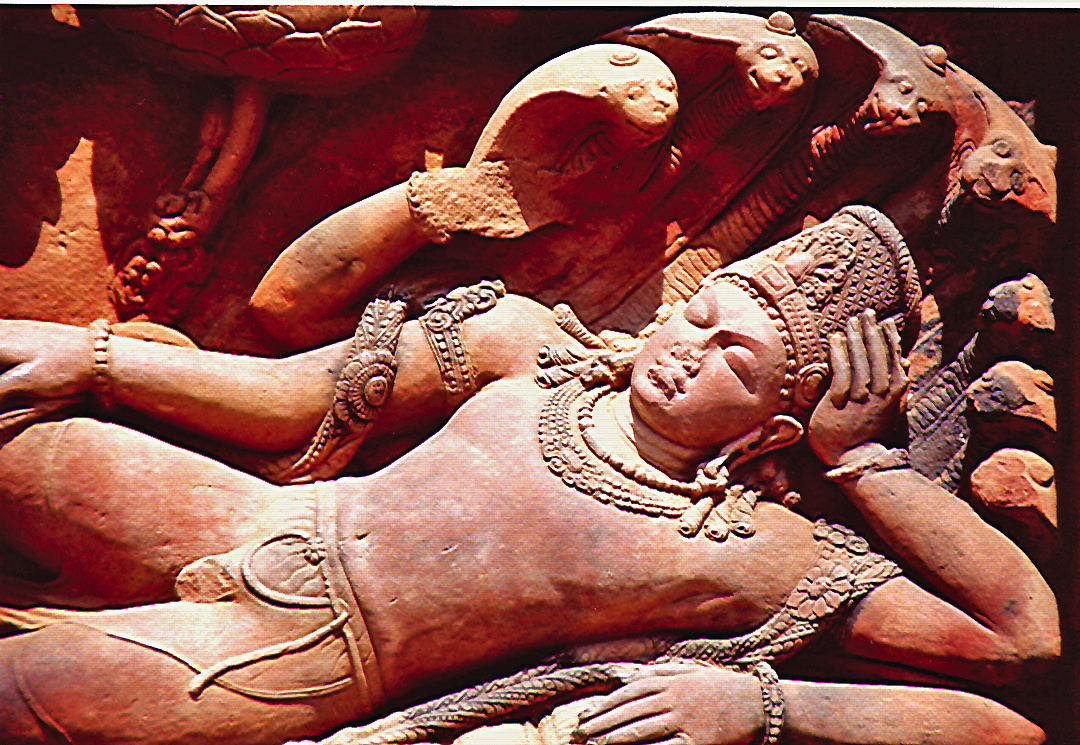
Vishnu, the bearer of the epithet

In the Bhagavad Gita, Arjuna addresses Krishna as Madhava (meaning "lord of fortune"; not to confused with a secondary name, Madhusudana, which means "slayer of the demon Madhu").

According to Adi Shankara's commentary on the Vishnu Sahasranama and the Narada Pancharatra, Madhava means the consort (dhava) of the mother (ma), referring to Lakshmi, the goddess called the 'mother of the universe'. Alternatively, it means the 'one who is fit to be known through Madhu-vidya', or can mean the 'one who is the lord of ma, or knowledge.

== Literature ==
In the Harivamsa Purana, during the episode of Krishna's elopement with Princess Rukmini, the epithet is mentioned during his battle against Rukmi:

Although Rukshmi was very careful the highly powerful and valiant Madhava cut off the standard of his car and the head of his charioteer from his body.

— Harivamsa Purana, Chapter 61

== See also ==
- Achyuta
- Gopala
- Gopinath
- Govinda
- Hari
- Keshava
- Narayana
- Radha Ramana
- Vāsudeva
