= Dahara-vidya =

Dahara-vidya or 'the knowledge of Brahman within', is a classical Hindu meditative practice mentioned in the Chandogya Upanishad and the Taittiriya Upanishad. In this practice, one concentrates on Brahman (the Universal Self) in the cave of the heart. It is one of the thirty-two vidyas of the Upanishads taught in Vedanta, in which Brahman is the imperceptible ether within the heart. This vidya explains the identity of the external and the internal, the objective and the subjective, the macrocosmic and the microcosmic, the universal and the individual, Brahman and the Atman.

== Significance ==
In the Dahara-vidya, Brahman is to be conceived as dwelling in the cavity of the heart, and yet as big as the whole universe. Dahara-vidya entails realization of the Atman in the space (daharā, दहरा), the subtle inner sky within one's heart. In this vidya, one desires the auspicious qualities of Brahman; the man who knows Brahman obtains, together with Brahman, all qualities of Brahman.

== Exposition ==
Dahara-vidya is described in six brief passages in the eighth chapter of the Chandogya Upanishad. These passages explain that the abode of Brahman is the small lotus that is here in this city of Brahman, what is there in the small space within the lotus is to be searched out.

Advaita philosopher Sankara explains that for persons who have realized the unity of the Self, there is absence of the idea of 'traveler', 'travel' and 'destination', and on the cessation of the causes for continuance of the traces of ignorance etc. they merge in their own self; Brahman who is devoid of direction, location, qualities, movement, and differences of results, appears to people of dull intellect as non-existing, Dahara-vidya is taught to make them come to the right path. Therefore, the sage of Chandogya Upanishad insists that he (Brahman) who resides in the small space existing within the small lotus-like dwelling that is within the city of Brahman has to be enquired into (with the help of a teacher and other valid means). The space referred to within the heart is as vast as the space outside, within it are included both heaven and earth; whatever one has and whatever one does not have, all that is included in that space as also all beings and all desires. For those who have not realized Brahman the results acquired through actions get exhausted in this world and those acquired through virtues in the next. For those who have realized the Self there is freedom of movement in all the worlds. Then, whatever province he becomes attracted to, whatever objects he desires, that appears by his very desire, and being associated with that he becomes glorified. The sage tells us –

स वा एष आत्मा हृदि तस्यैतदेव निरुक्तं हृदयमिति तस्मादह्रिदयमहरहर्वा एवंवित्स्वर्गं लोकमेति |

"This self which is such surely exists in the heart. Of that this is verily the deprivation: It is in the heart; therefore that is called the heart. A man of such knowledge daily reaches the heavenly world."
