= Vidya (philosophy) =

Conceptions of knowledge and understanding in Indian religions

Vidya (Sanskrit: विद्या, IAST: vidyā) figures prominently in all texts pertaining to Indian philosophy – meaning science, learning, knowledge, and scholarship. Most importantly, it refers to valid knowledge, which cannot be contradicted, and true knowledge, which is the intuitively-gained knowledge of the self. Vidya is not mere intellectual knowledge, for the Vedas demand understanding.

== Meaning ==
Vidya primarily means "correct knowledge" in any field of science, learning, philosophy, or any factual knowledge that cannot be disputed or refuted.

Its root is vid (Sanskrit: विद्), which means "to reason upon", knower, finding, knowing, acquiring or understanding.

== Hinduism ==
In Hindu philosophy, vidyā refers to the knowledge of the soul or spiritual knowledge; it refers to the study of the six schools of Hindu philosophy: Nyaya, Yoga, Vaisheshika, Samkhya, Purvamimamsa and Uttaramimamsa. The process of gaining the knowledge of the Atman cannot commence unless one has explored the Prānavidya or Agnividya to the full in all its numerous phase; through vidyā or upasana to jnana was always the eternal order indicated by the Upanishads. Jnāna dawns after the completion and perfection of the being through the vidyās; then, one crosses over beyond birth and death having already destroyed the bonds of death.

=== Vedas ===
During the Vedic period, vidyādāna or the gift for the sake of education was considered to be the best of gifts, possessing a higher religious efficacy than even the gift of land. Vidyā comes from the root vid ("to know"); it therefore means knowledge, science, learning, lore, scholarship and philosophy. There are basically four Vidyas:

1. Trayi (triple) which is the study of the Vedas and their auxiliary texts;
2. Anviksiki which is logic and metaphysics;
3. Dandaniti which is the science of governance;
4. Varum, the practical arts such as agriculture, commerce, medicine etc.

Vidyā gives insight, in the spiritual sphere it leads to salvation, in the mundane sphere it leads to progress and prosperity. Vidyā illuminates the mind and shatters illusions, increases intelligence, power and efficiency; develops the intellect and makes it more re-fined; it effects a complete transformation as the root of all happiness and as the source of illumination and power. The word, Vidyā, does not occur in the Rig Veda, it occurs in the Atharvaveda and in the Brahmana portions of the Yajurveda and in the Upanishads.

=== Agni Vidyā ===
Agni Vidyā or the science of fire is said to be the greatest discovery of the ancient Indians who gained direct experience of divine fire through continuous research, contemplation, observation and experimentation; their experience led them to discover ways of using this knowledge to heal and nurture the outer and the inner worlds. To them fire is sacred, and because of the pervasive nature of fire all things are sacred. Body and mind which are extensions of the fire that the soul spontaneously emits are also sacred. Within the body the most significant centres of fire are more subtle than those of the sense organs. They are called the chakras which are seven fields of sacred fire. The understanding of the role of fire without and within gives proper self-understanding which understanding is gained through yogic practices. The performance of yajnas is the karma-kānda aspect of agni vidyā. All rituals follow set rules and conditions. The main function of the fire ritual is to make an offering to nature's finest forces and divinities that fill the space of inner consciousness; fire carries oblations to these forces and divinities. The fire has seven tongues all having unique qualities. The gods, goddesses, divinities and nature's forces are grouped in seven main categories which match with the qualities of the seven tongues of fire.

=== In Vedanta and the Upanishads ===
==== Atmaikatva ====
Atmaikatva or the absolute oneness of the self is the theme of entire Advaita Vedanta which distinguishes six pramanas or means of valid knowledge, but this vidyā or knowledge of Brahman is guhahita, gahavareshta i.e. set in the secret place and hidden in its depth, unattainable except through adhyātma-yoga, the meditation centering upon the nature of the self. Vedanta literature is only preparatory to it, it dispels ignorance and makes the mind receptive but does not reveal the truth therefore it is an indirect means of knowledge. The oneness of the self, which is self-established and self-shining, is called vidyā in cosmic reference which reveals the true nature of Brahman, the self-shining pure consciousness which is not a visaya ('object matter or content') but the one subject, transcendent of all conventional subjects and objects. The Self or the Atman is to be sought, the Self is to be enquired into, known and understood.

==== Hierarchy of knowledge ====
The sage of the Mundaka Upanishad (Verse I.1.4), more in the context of the ritualistic than of epistemological concerns, states that there are two kinds of knowledge (vidyā) to be attained, the higher (para) and the lower (apara). Para vidyā, the higher knowledge, is knowledge of the Absolute (Brahman, Atman); Apara, the lower knowledge, is knowledge of the world – of objects, events, means, ends, virtues and vices. Para vidyā has Reality as its content; Apara vidyā, the phenomenal world. According to Advaita Vedanta, Para vidyā, by the nature of its content, possesses a unique quality of ultimacy that annuls any supposed ultimacy that might be attached to any other or form of knowledge, and is intuitively gained as self-certifying. Once Brahman is realized all other modes of knowledge are seen to be touched by avidyā, the root of ignorance. In this context, Vidyā means true knowledge. However, it is argued that the Advaita Vedanta interpretation does not answer the final question: what is the reality or truth-value of avidyā or what is the substratum that is the basis or cause of avidyā?

==== Valid knowledge ====
The Upanishads teach that the knowledge of difference is avidyā or ignorance, and the knowledge of identity is true knowledge or vidyā or valid knowledge, which leads to life eternal. For the Cārvākas, perception is the only means of valid knowledge (pramana). Vadi Deva Suri of the Jaina school defines valid knowledge as determinate cognition which apprehends itself and an object and which is capable of prompting activity which attains a desirable object or rejects an undesirable object; the result of valid knowledge is cessation of ignorance. Vaisheshikas recognized four kinds of valid knowledge – Perception, Inference, Recollection and Intuition. The Mimamsa schools introduced the concept of intrinsic validity of knowledge (svatahpramanya) and extrinsic validity of knowledge (parastah-apramana) but agreed that the validity of knowledge cannot be determined by the knowledge of any special excellence in its cause or the knowledge of its harmony with the real nature of its object or the knowledge of a fruitful action. Sankara accepted perception, inference, scriptural testimony, comparison, presumption and non-apprehension as the six sources of knowledge and concluded that the knowledge which corresponds with the real nature of its object is valid. The Atman is the reality in the empirical self as the ever-present foundational subject-objectless universal consciousness which sustains the empirical self.

==== Significance ====
In upāsanā the movement starts from the outer extremities and gradually penetrates into the inmost recesses of the soul, and the whole investigation is conducted in two spheres, in the subject as well as in the object, in the individual as well as in the world, in the aham as also in the idam, in the adhyātma and also in adhidaiva spheres and conducted synthetically as well as analytically, through apti as well as samrddhi, which the Bhagavad Gita calls yoga and vibhooti. The vidyās do not rest content in knowing the reality simply as a whole but proceed further to comprehend it in all its infinite details too. The higher includes the lower grades and adds something more to it and never rejects it; the lower has its fulfilment in the higher and finds its consummation there but never faces extinction. All forms of contemplation have only one aim: to lead to the Supreme Knowledge and hence they are termed as vidyās; through vidyā, which is amrta, one attains immortality (Shvetashvatara Upanishad Verse V.1). Dahara Vidyā, Udgitha Vidyā and Madhu Vidyā are the synthetic way whereas the analytic way is signified by the Sleeping man of the Garga-Ajātsatru episode and by the Five Sheaths, which ways show that the world and the individual spring from the same eternal source.

=== In Hindu Tantra ===
In Hinduism, goddesses are personifications of the deepest level of power and energy. The concept of Shakti, in its most abstract terms, relates to the energetic principle of ultimate reality, the dynamic aspect of the divine. This concept surfaces in the Kena Upanishad as Goddess Umā bestowing Brahma-vidya on Indra; when linked with shakti and maya, she embodies the power of illusion (maya), encompassing ignorance (avidya) and knowledge (vidyā) and thereby presented with a dual personality. According to the Saktas, Māyā is basically a positive, creative, magical energy of the Goddess that brings forth the universe. The ten Mahāvidyās are bestowers or personifications of transcendent and liberating religious knowledge; the term Vidyā in this context refers to power, essence of reality and the mantras. The gentle and motherly forms of Goddess Sri Vidyā are 'right-handed'. When the awareness of the 'exterior' (Shiva) combined with the "I" encompasses the entire space as "I" it is called sada-siva-tattva. When later, discarding the abstraction of the Self and the exterior, clear identification with the insentient space takes place, it is called isvara-tattva; the investigation of these two last steps is pure vidyā (knowledge). Māyā, which has been identified with Prakrti in the Shvetashvatara Upanishad represents its three gunas; also identified with avidyā, which term primarily means the dark abyss of non-being and secondarily the mysterious darkness of the unmanifest state, Māyā binds through avidyā and releases through vidyā .

== Buddhism ==
In Tibetan Buddhism, the word, rigpa, meaning vidyā, similarly refers to non-dualistic awareness or intrinsic awareness.

=== Vidyā mantras ===
In Vajrayana texts, mantras exist in three forms: guhyā (secret), vidyā (knowledge) dhāraṇī (mnemonic). Male Buddhist tantric deities are represented by the grammatically masculine vidyā, while female Buddhist tantric deities are represented by the grammatically feminine dhāraṇī. The vidyā mantras constitute the knowledge and the mind of all the Buddhas and that which possesses the dharma-dhātu (essence of dharma), and it is this knowledge, according to Cabezon, which "pacifies the suffering experienced in the existential world (saṃsāra) and the heaps of faults such as desire".

=== Pañcavidyā ===
In Buddhism, the pañcavidyā (Sanskrit; Chinese: 五明; pinyin: wǔ-míng) or "five sciences" are the five major classes of knowledge (vidyā) which bodhisattvas are said to have mastered. A recognised master of all five sciences is afforded the title paṇḍita. The five sciences are:

1. the "science of language" (śabda vidyā; shēng-míng, 聲明);
2. the "science of logic" (hetu vidyā; yīn-míng, 因明);
3. the "science of medicine" (cikitsā vidyā; yào-míng, 藥明);
4. the "science of fine arts and crafts" (śilpa-karma-sthāna vidyā; gōngqiǎo-míng, 工巧明);
5. the "inner science" of spirituality (adhyātma vidyā; nèi-míng, 內明) which relates to the study of the Tripiṭaka.

== See also ==
- Jñāna
- Mahavidya
- Prajñā (Buddhism)
- Prajñā (Hinduism)
