= Madhab (disambiguation) =

Madhab is a school of thought within Islamic jurisprudence.

Madhab may also refer to:

== People ==
- Madhab Basnet, Nepalese journalist
- Madhab Chandra Dash (born 1939), Indian ecologist and environmental biologist
- Madhab Rajbangshi (born 1954), Indian politician
- Madhab Sardar, Indian politician
- Beni Madhab Das (1866–1952), Bengali scholar and teacher
- Nila Madhab Panda (born 1973), Indian film producer
- Rudra Madhab Ray (1937–2016), Indian politician
- Dvija Madhab (c. 16th century), Bengali poet

== Places ==
- Madhab, Fujairah
- Madhab Palace
- Madhab Spring Park

== See also ==
- Madhava (disambiguation)
