= Madhavaram, Thavanampalle =

Madhavaram
- village
- Location in Andhra Pradesh, India
- Coordinates: 13.267520744292177°N 78.9760258280524°E
- Country: India
- State: Andhra Pradesh
- District: Chittoor

Government
  - Body: Village Panchayat

Population
  - Total: 1,716

Languages
  - Official: Telugu
- Time zone: UTC+5:30 (IST)
- ISO 3166 code: IN-AP
- Vehicle registration: AP
- Nearest city: Thavanampalle
- Website: ap.gov.in

Madhavaram, is a village in Thavanampalle Taluk, Chittoor district in the state of Andhra Pradesh in India.

== Demographics ==
Total Number of Household : 449
Population	Persons	Males	Females
Total	1,716	854	862
In the age group 0–6 years	180	92	88
Scheduled Castes (SC)	287	148	139
Scheduled Tribes (ST)	350	173	177
Literates	946	537	409
Illiterate	770	317	453
Total Worker	849	531	318
Main Worker	835	527	308
Main Worker - Cultivator	308	204	104
Main Worker - Agricultural Labourers	498	303	195
Main Worker - Household Industries	4	2	2
Main Worker - Other	25	18	7
Marginal Worker	14	4	10
Marginal Worker - Cultivator	1	0	1
Marginal Worker - Agriculture Labourers	6	3	3
Marginal Worker - Household Industries	0	0	0
Marginal Workers - Other	7	1	6
Marginal Worker (3-6 Months)	9	2	7
Marginal Worker - Cultivator (3-6 Months)	1	0	1
Marginal Worker - Agriculture Labourers (3-6 Months)	4	2	2
Marginal Worker - Household Industries (3-6 Months)	0	0	0
Marginal Worker - Other (3-6 Months)	4	0	4
Marginal Worker (0-3 Months)	5	2	3
Marginal Worker - Cultivator (0-3 Months)	0	0	0
Marginal Worker - Agriculture Labourers (0-3 Months)	2	1	1
Marginal Worker - Household Industries (0-3 Months)	0	0	0
Marginal Worker - Other Workers (0-3 Months)	3	1	2
Non Worker	867	323	544
