= Madhavaram, Kadapa =

Madhavaram
- village
- Location in Andhra Pradesh, India
- Coordinates: 14.412579234394057°N 78.98043389745025°E
- Country: India
- State: Andhra Pradesh
- District: Kadapa

Government
  - Body: Village Panchayat

Population
  - Total: Uninhabited

Languages
  - Official: Telugu
- Time zone: UTC+5:30 (IST)
- ISO 3166 code: IN-AP
- Vehicle registration: AP
- Nearest city: Kadapa
- Website: ap.gov.in

Madhavaram, is an uninhabited village in Vontimitta Taluk, Kadapa district in the state of Andhra Pradesh in India.

== Demographics ==
Total Number of Household : 0
Population	Persons	Males	Females
Total	0	0	0
In the age group 0–6 years	0	0	0
Scheduled Castes (SC)	0	0	0
Scheduled Tribes (ST)	0	0	0
Literates	0	0	0
Illiterate	0	0	0
Total Worker	0	0	0
Main Worker	0	0	0
Main Worker - Cultivator	0	0	0
Main Worker - Agricultural Labourers	0	0	0
Main Worker - Household Industries	0	0	0
Main Worker - Other	0	0	0
Marginal Worker	0	0	0
Marginal Worker - Cultivator	0	0	0
Marginal Worker - Agriculture Labourers	0	0	0
Marginal Worker - Household Industries	0	0	0
Marginal Workers - Other	0	0	0
Marginal Worker (3-6 Months)	0	0	0
Marginal Worker - Cultivator (3-6 Months)	0	0	0
Marginal Worker - Agriculture Labourers (3-6 Months)	0	0	0
Marginal Worker - Household Industries (3-6 Months)	0	0	0
Marginal Worker - Other (3-6 Months)	0	0	0
Marginal Worker (0-3 Months)	0	0	0
Marginal Worker - Cultivator (0-3 Months)	0	0	0
Marginal Worker - Agriculture Labourers (0-3 Months)	0	0	0
Marginal Worker - Household Industries (0-3 Months)	0	0	0
Marginal Worker - Other Workers (0-3 Months)	0	0	0
Non Worker	0	0	0
