= Madhu =

Word in Indo-Aryan languages

Madhu (Sanskrit: madhu) is a word used in several Indo-Aryan languages meaning honey or sweet. It is ultimately derived from Proto-Indo-European *médʰu, whence English mead.

== Metaphorical use ==
Madhu has been used for millennia since the Rigveda (1500–1000 BCE) in a similar metaphorical sense as wine is in English, e.g. "the wine of truth", and employed in that manner in Hindu religious literature. For example, the Brihadaranyaka Upanishad, believed to have been composed in the first millennium BCE, contains a chapter called the Madhu Brahmana, and "the secret essence of the Vedas themselves, was called the Madhu-vidya or 'honey doctrine'".

== Various opinions ==
There are different opinions surrounding the word Madhu. Some scholars date metaphorical usage of madhu to a time very close to the initial composition of the Vedas. Soma, the shared sacred drink of the Indo-Iranians (known as haoma in Avestan), is often metaphorically referred to as madhu in the Vedas. However, "the Avesta, which is quite close to the Veda with regard to the terminology of Soma, does not know the equation 'Soma' = 'madhu'."

In Rigveda 8.48.1 and Rigveda 8.48.3, in the book of soma, soma is clearly addressed and explained as madhu.

== Usage in names ==
The derivative form Madhur is used as a Hindu first-name for males and Madhu is a first-name common among males, although both names can occur for either gender. Madhuri is a common feminine variant of Madhur. The word madhur is a combination of madhu (honey/sweet) and -r/-ra (like or similar). Several other names are based on the root madhu, such as Madhukar, Madhusudhan, Madhulika and Madhubala.

== See also ==
- Kvasir, a wise being in Norse mythology born from the spit of the gods and from whose blood the Mead of Poetry is crafted
