= Brihadaranyaka Upanishad =

One of the ancient Sanskrit scriptures of Hinduism

Brihadaranyaka
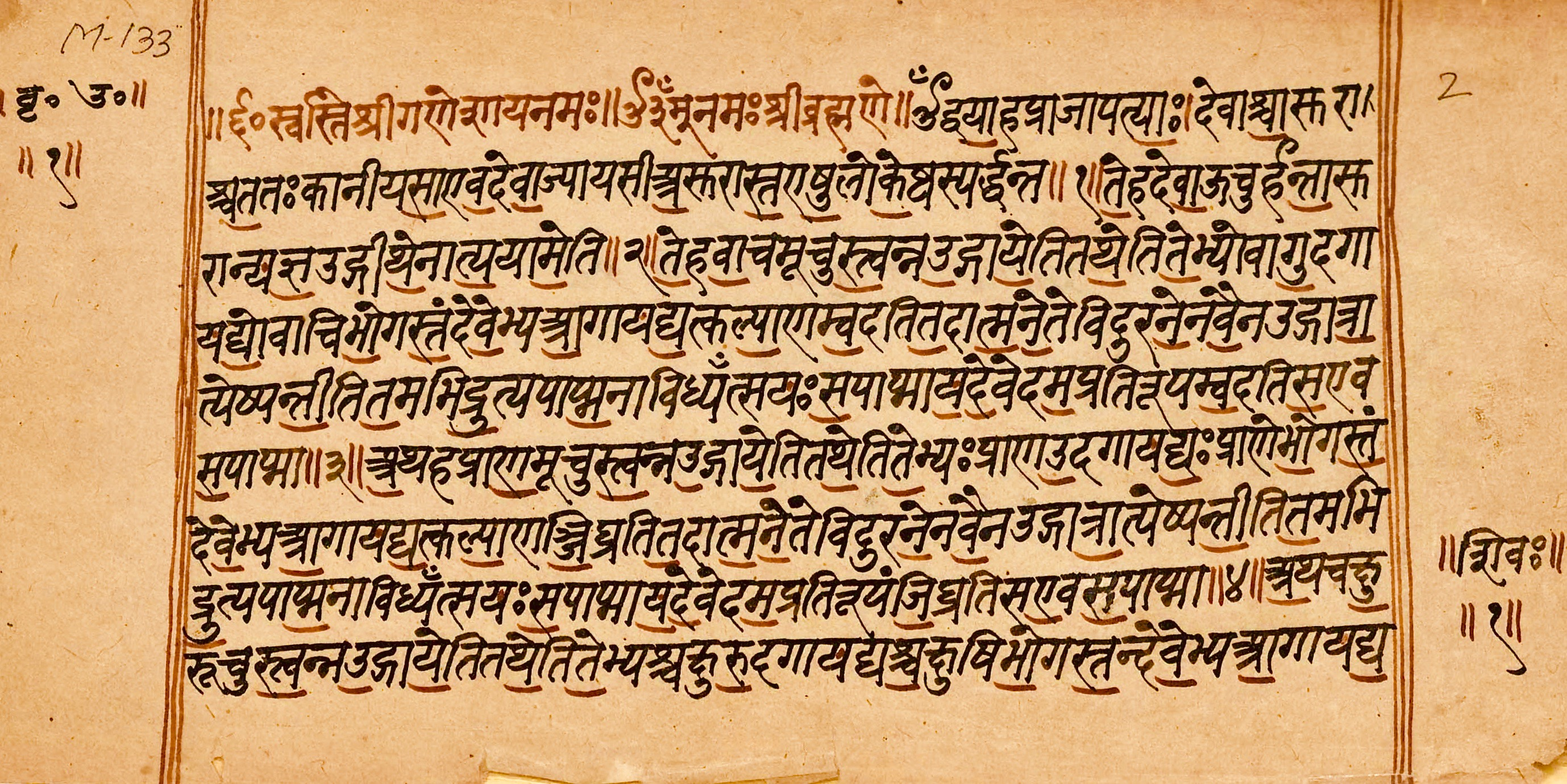
- Brihadaranyaka Upanishad, verses 1.3.1 to 1.3.4 (Sanskrit, Devanagari script)
- Devanagari: बृहदारण्यक
- IAST: Bṛhadāraṇyaka
- Date: 7th-6th century BCE
- Author(s): Yajnavalkya
- Type: Mukhya Upanishads
- Linked Veda: Shukla Yajurveda
- Linked Brahmana: Shatapatha Brahmana
- Linked Aranyaka: Brihad Aranyaka
- Chapters: 6
- Philosophy: Ātman, Brahman
- Commented by: Adi Shankara, Madhvacharya, Ramanujacharya
- Popular verse: "Aham Brahmasmi"

The Brihadaranyaka Upanishad (Sanskrit: बृहदारण्यकोपनिषद्, IAST: Bṛhadāraṇyaka Upaniṣad) is one of the Principal Upanishads, associated with the Shukla Yajurveda, and is one of the first Upanishadic scriptures of Hinduism. A key scripture to various schools of Hinduism, the Brihadaranyaka Upanishad is tenth in the Muktikā or "canon of 108 Upanishads".

The Brihadaranyaka Upanishad is estimated to have been composed about 7th–6th century BCE. The Sanskrit text is preserved in two recensions, Mādhyandina and Kāṇva, and survives in medieval palm‑leaf manuscripts, the oldest of which date to the 12th century CE. Extant manuscripts are held in the National Archives of Nepal (via the Nepal–German Manuscript Preservation Project), the Sarasvati Bhavana Granthalaya in Varanasi, and later paper manuscripts in the Bhandarkar Oriental Research Institute in Pune. The Sanskrit language text is contained within the Shatapatha Brahmana, which is itself a part of the Shukla Yajurveda. The Brihadaranyaka Upanishad is a treatise on Ātman (Self), and includes passages on metaphysics, ethics, and a yearning for knowledge that influenced various Indian religions, ancient and medieval scholars, and attracted secondary works such as those by Adi Shankara and Madhvacharya.

== Chronology ==
The chronology of Brihadaranyaka Upanishad, like other Upanishads, is uncertain and contested. The chronology is difficult to resolve because all opinions rest on scanty evidence, an analysis of archaism, style, and repetitions across texts, driven by assumptions about the likely evolution of ideas, and on presumptions about which philosophy might have influenced which other Indian philosophies. Patrick Olivelle states, "in spite of claims made by some, in reality, any dating of these documents (early Upanishads) that attempts a precision closer than a few centuries is as stable as a house of cards".

The chronology and authorship of the Brihadaranyaka Upanishad, alongside the Chandogya and Kaushitaki Upanishads, is further complicated because they are compiled anthologies of literature that must have existed as independent texts before they became part of these Upanishads.

The exact year and even the century of the Upanishad's composition is unknown. Scholars have offered different estimates ranging from 900 BCE to 600 BCE, all preceding Buddhism. The Brihadaranyaka is one of the first Upanishads, alongside the Jaiminiya and Chandogya Upanishads. The Brihadaranyaka Upanishad was in all likelihood composed in the earlier part of 1st millennium BCE, in the 7th–6th century BCE, give or take a century or so, according to Patrick Olivelle. The text was likely a living document and some verses were edited over some time before the 6th century BCE.

== Etymology and structure ==
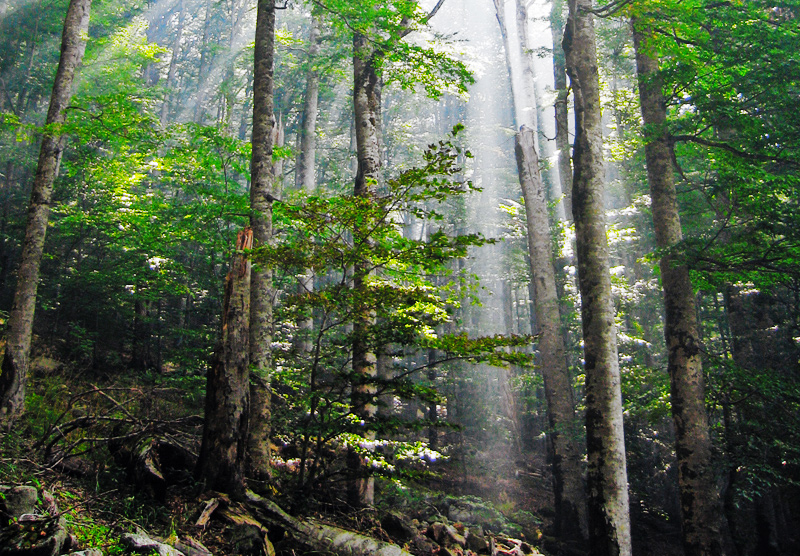
Brihadaranyaka Upanishad literally means the "Upanishad of the great forests".

Brihadaranyaka literally means "great wilderness or forest", but also suggests a link to the Aranyaka texts ("forest books"). The Brihadaranyaka Upanishad is credited to ancient sage Yajnavalkya, but was likely refined by a number of ancient Vedic scholars.

The Upanishad forms the last part, that is the fourteenth kānda, of the Śatapatha Brāhmana of the Śhukla Yajurveda. The Brihadaranyaka Upanishad is preserved in two major recensions – the Madhyandina and the Kanva recensions. The text consists of six adhyayas (chapters), which are further split into three sections (kandas) of two chapters each. This includes: the Madhu kānda (the 4th and 5th chapter of the fourteenth kānda of Satapatha Brahmana), Muni kānda (or Yajnavalkya Kanda, the 6th and 7th chapter of 14th kānda of Satapatha Brahmana) and Khila kānda (the 8th and 9th chapter of the fourteenth kānda of Satapatha Brahmana).

The first and second chapters of the Upanishad's Madhu kānda consists of six brahmanas each, with varying number of hymns per brahmana. The first chapter of the Upanishad's Yajnavalkya kānda consists of nine brahmanams, while the second has six brahmanas. The Khila kānda of the Upanishad has fifteen brahmanas in its first chapter, and five brahmanas in the second chapter.

== Content ==
=== First chapter ===
The Brihadaranyaka Upanishad starts by stating one of the many Vedic theories of creation of the universe. It asserts that there was nothing before the universe began. Then, Prajapati created the universe from this nothingness as a sacrifice to themself, imbuing it with Prana (life force) to preserve it in the form of cosmic inert matter and individual psychic energy. The Brihadaranyaka Upanishad asserts that the world is more than just matter and energy; it is also constituted by Atman or Brahman (Self, Consciousness, Invisible Principles, and Reality) as well as Knowledge.

The Brahmana 4 in the first chapter announces the non-dual monistic metaphysical premise that Atman and Brahman are identical Oneness. It asserts that because the universe came out of nothingness when the only principle existent was "I am He", the universe, after coming into existence, continues as Aham brahma asmi (I am Brahman). In the last brahmana of the first chapter, the Upanishad explains that the Atman (Self) inspires by being self-evident (name identity), through empowering forms, and through action (work of a living being). The Self, states Brihadaranyaka, is the imperishable one that is invisible and concealed pervading all of reality.

=== Second chapter ===
The Brihadaranyaka Upanishad starts the second chapter as a conversation between Ajatashatru and Balaki Gargya on theory of dreams, positing that human beings see dreams entirely unto themselves because mind draws, in itself, the powers of sensory organs, which it releases in the waking state. Brihadaranyaka in brahmana 3 asserts that the human mind can perceive and construct its own reality. Mind is a means, prone to flaws. It emphasizes the struggle to realize the true, unknowable nature of Atman-Brahman, described as "neti, neti" (not this, not this), beyond qualities or characteristics.

In the fourth brahmana of the Brihadaranyaka Upanishad, Yajnavalkya and his wife Maitreyi engage in a dialogue about love and spirituality. Yajnavalkya states that one doesn't connect with and love forms, nor does one connect or love mind, rather one connects with the Self, the Self of one's own and one's beloved. All love is for the sake of one's Self, and the Oneness one realizes in the Self of the beloved. He then asserts that this knowledge of the Self, the Self, and Brahman is what makes one immortal, and the connection is also immortal. All longing is the longing for the Self, as the Self represents the true, the immortal, the real, and infinite bliss. Thus one must listen, reflect and internalize this truth.

The fifth brahmana introduces the Madhu theory, giving this section the name Madhu Khanda. The Madhu theory is one of the foundational principles of Vedanta schools of Hinduism, as well as other āstika schools of Indian philosophies. Madhu literally means "honey", or the composite fruit of numerous actions on the field of flowers. In this theory, notes Paul Deussen, the Brihadaranyaka Upanishad asserts that "Atman exists" (Self exists), that all organic beings (plants, animals, human beings and gods) are all beings are interconnected with each other and Brahman (Cosmic Self); it further asserts that inorganic nature (fire, air, earth, water, space) is the field where the beings act, and where their numerous actions create fruits that they separately and together experience. The Upanishad then states that everything is connected, beings affect each other, organic beings affect the inorganic nature, inorganic nature affects the organic beings, one is the "honey" (result, fruit, food) of the other, everyone and everything is mutually dependent, nourishing and nurturing each other, all stemming from one Brahman, resulting in blissful oneness. This theory appears in various early and middle Upanishads, and parallels Immanuel Kant's doctrine of "the affinity of phenomena" built on "the synthetic unity of apperception".

The last brahmanam of the Upanishad's first section is a Vamsa (generational line of teachers) with the names of 57 Vedic scholars who are credited to have taught the Madhu Khanda from one generation to the next.

=== Third chapter ===
The third chapter is a metaphysical dialogue between ten ancient sages, on the nature of Reality (Brahman), Atman (individual self), and Mukti (liberation). This metaphysical dialogue was held at the court of the King Janaka in Mithila during the occasion of the Bahudakshina Yajna organised by the king at his court. The Bahudakshina Yajna was organised by the King Kriti Janaka to find out the greatest scholar of Vedas called as Brahmistha among the participating Brahmin scholars at the court. Paul Deussen calls the presentation of ancient scholar Yajnavalkya in this chapter "not dissimilar to that of Socrates in the dialogues of Plato". Among other things, the chapter presents the theory of perceived empirical knowledge using the concepts of graha (sensory action) and atigraha (sense). It lists 8 combinations of graha and atigraha: breath and smell, speech and name (ideas), tongue and taste, eye and form, ear and sound, skin and touch, mind and desire, arms and work respectively. The sages debate the nature of death and whether any graha and atigraha prevails after one dies. After ruling out six of the sensory actions, they assert that one's ideas (name) and one's actions and work (karma) continue to have an impact on the universe even after one's physical death.

The fourth brahmana of the third chapter asserts, "it is your Self which is inside all", all Selfs are one, immanent and transcendent. The fifth brahmana states that profound knowledge requires one to give up showing off one's erudition, then to adopt childlike curiosity and simplicity, followed by becoming silent, meditating, and being observant (muni). This marks the beginning of the journey toward profound knowledge and understanding the Self of all things, where freedom from frustration and sorrow is found.

In the sixth and eighth brahmana, focus is on the concept of the imperishable (akshara). In these brahmanas, Gargi Vachaknavi and Yajñavalka engage in philosophical inquiries and debates, exploring the ultimate truth and the imperishable nature of reality. The discussions explore deep philosophical ideas, highlighting the importance of seeking spiritual wisdom and the quest to understand the timeless, unchanging reality that transcends the material world.

The seventh brahmana explores the interconnectedness of the Self with all of existence, emphasizing its role as the inner controller, often without the knowledge of beings. It asserts that the Self is the true essence. The ninth brahmana, the longest in the third chapter, introduces the "neti, neti" principle, which is later discussed along with the analogical equivalence between the physical features of a man and those of a tree. It highlights that the root of a man is his Self. The last hymns of chapter 3 in Brihadaranyaka Upanishad also attest to the prevalent practice of the renouncing ascetic life by the time Brihadaranyaka Upanishad was composed in Vedic age of India, and it is these ascetic circles that are credited for major movements such as Yoga as well as the śramaṇa traditions later to be called Buddhism, Jainism and heterodox Hinduism.

When one tears out the tree from its roots,
the tree can grow no more,
out of which root the man grows forth,
when he is struck down by death?
He, who is born, is not born,
Who is supposed to beget him anew? (...)
Brahman is bliss, Brahman is knowledge,
It is the highest good of one who gives charity,
and also of one who stands away (renounces) and knows it.

— Brihadaranyaka Upanishad, 3:9

=== Fourth chapter ===
The fourth chapter of Brihadaranyaka Upanishad begins with a dialogue between King Janaka and Yajnavalka. It explores various aspects of the "Self exists" theory, its phenomenal manifestations, and its philosophical implications on soteriology. In the first brahmanam of the fourth chapter, the Upanishad states that the Self manifests in human life in six forms: Prajna (consciousness), Priyam (love and the will to live), Satyam (reverence for truth, reality), Ananta (endlessness, curiosity for the eternal), Ananda (bliss, contentness), and Sthiti (the state of enduring steadfastness, calm perseverance).

In the second brahmanam, the Upanishad explores the question, "what happens to Self after one dies?", and provides the root of two themes that play a central role in later schools of Hinduism: first, the concept of Self as individual Selves (dualism), and second, the concept of Self being One and Eternal, neither coming nor going anywhere, because it is everywhere and in everyone in Oneness (non-dualism). This chapter discusses the widely cited "neti, neti" (नेति नेति, "not this, not this") principle on one's journey to understanding Self. The second brahmanam concludes that Self exists is self-evident, Self is blissfully free, Self is eternally invulnerable, and Self is indescribable knowledge.

The hymn 4.2.4 of Brihadaranyaka Upanishad is one of many instances in the ancient Sanskrit text where the characters involved in philosophical debate greet each other with Namaste (नमस्ते), a practice in the culture of India.

The third brahmanam of the fourth chapter discusses the premises of moksha (liberation, freedom, emancipation, self-realization), and provides some of the most studied hymns of Brihadaranyaka. Paul Deussen calls it, "unique in its richness and warmth of presentation", with profoundness that retains its full worth in modern times. It translates as follows,

But when he appearing to be a god or a king, thinks 'I alone am this world! I am all!' — that is his highest world.
Now, this is the aspect of his that is beyond what appears to be good, freed from what is bad, and without fear.

"It is like this. As a man embraced by a woman he loves is oblivious to everything within or without, so this person embraced by the prajna (conscious, aware, self) consisting of knowledge is oblivious to everything within or without. Clearly, this is the aspect of his where all desires are fulfilled, where the self is the only desire, and which is free from desires and far from sorrows.

Here a father is not a father, a mother is not a mother, worlds are not worlds, gods are not gods, and Vedas are not Vedas.
Here a thief is not a thief, a murderer is not a murderer, an outsider is not an outsider, a pariah is not a pariah, a recluse is not a recluse, and an ascetic is not an ascetic.
Neither the good nor the bad follows him, for he has now passed beyond all sorrows of the heart.
(...)
So did Yajnavalkya instruct him.
"This is his highest goal!
This is his highest attainment!
This is his highest world!
This is his highest bliss!
On just a fraction of this bliss do other creatures live.

— Brihadaranyaka Upanishad, Chapter 4, Brahmanam 3, Hymns 20–32, Translated by Patrick Olivelle

The fourth brahmanam continues to build the thematic description of Atman-Brahman (Self) and the state of self-realization as achieved. Yajnavalkya declares that knowledge is Self, knowledge is freedom, knowledge powers inner peace. In hymn 4.4.22, the Upanishad states:

स वा एष महानज आत्मा योऽयं विज्ञानमयः प्राणेषु य एषोऽन्तर्हृदय आकाशस्तस्मिञ्छेते सर्वस्य वशी सर्वस्येशानः सर्वस्याधिपतिः स न साधुना कर्मणा भूयान्नो एवासाधुना कनीयानेष सर्वेश्वर एष भूताधिपतिरेष भूतपाल एष सेतुर्विधरण एषां लोकानामसंभेदाय तमेतं वेदानुवचनेन ब्राह्मणा विविदिषन्ति यज्ञेन दानेन तपसाऽनाशकेनैतमेव विदित्वा मुनिर्भवति। एतमेव प्रव्राजिनो लोकमिच्छन्तः प्रव्रजन्ति।

He is that great unborn Self, who consists of Knowledge, is surrounded by the Prânas (life-force), the ether within the heart. In it [Self] there reposes the ruler of all, the lord of all, the king of all. He does not become greater by good works, nor smaller by evil works. He is the lord of all, the king of all things, the protector of all things. He is a bank and a boundary, so that these worlds may not be confounded. He who knows him [Self], becomes a Muni. Wishing for that world, mendicants leave their homes.

— Brihadaranyaka Upanishad, Chapter 4, Brahmanam 4, Hymn 22,

Max Müller and Paul Deussen, in their respective translations, describe the Upanishad's view of "Self" and "free, liberated state of existence" as, "[Self] is imperishable, for he cannot perish; he is unattached, for he does not attach himself; unfettered, he does not suffer, he does not fail. He is beyond good and evil, and neither what he has done, nor what he has omitted to do, affects him. (...) He therefore who knows it [reached self-realization], becomes quiet, subdued, satisfied, patient, and collected. He sees self in Self, sees all as Self. Evil does not overcome him, he overcomes all evil. Evil does not burn him, he burns all evil. Free from evil, free from spots, free from doubt, he became Atman-Brâhmana; this is the Brahma-world, O King, thus spoke Yagnavalkya."

The last brahmanam of the Upanishad's second section is another Vamsa (generational line of teachers) with the names of 59 Vedic scholars who are credited to have taught the hymns of Muni Khanda from one generation to the next, before it became part of Brihadaranyaka.

=== Fifth and sixth chapters ===
The fifth and sixth chapters of Brihadaranyaka Upanishad are known as Khila Khanda, which literally means "supplementary section, or appendix". Each brahmanam in the supplement is small except the fourteenth. This section, suggests Paul Deussen, was likely written later to clarify and add ideas considered important in that later age.

Some brahmanams in the last section of Brihadaranyaka Upanishad, such as the second and third brahmanam in fifth chapter, append ethical theories, while fourth brahmanam in the fifth chapter asserts that "empirical reality and truth is Brahman". In the fourth brahmanam of sixth chapter, sexual rituals between a husband and wife are described to conceive and celebrate the birth of a child.

== Teachings ==
The Brihadaranyaka Upanishad has been an important work in Vedanta and it discusses many early concepts and theories foundational to Hinduism such as karma, Atman-Brahman, the afterlife, etc.

=== Creation ===
The Brihadaranyaka contains various passages which discuss the beginning of the universe and its creation. A key figure in this process is the deity Prajapati, who creates the world through liturgical recitation, priestly sacrifice, dividing up his own body, copulation, giving birth to various devas and demons.

The verse 1.4.1 on the creation states: "in the beginning this world was just a single body (atman) shaped like a man. He looked around and saw nothing but himself." The Brihadaranyaka goes on to state that this single body became afraid and wanted to have a companion, so he split his body into two, made a wife and copulated with her to create all living beings.

=== Atman ===
The Brihadaranyaka Upanishad teaches the theory of atman (the Self), which is the eternal inner reality in a person. It is described by the Brihadaranyaka as follows:

This innermost thing, this self (atman)—it is dearer than a son, it is dearer than wealth, it is dearer than everything else...a man should regard only his self as dear to him. When a man regards only his self as dear to him, what he holds dear will never perish.

This self is also the source of all vital functions:

As a spider sends forth its thread, and as tiny sparks spring forth from a fire, so indeed do all the vital functions (prana), all the worlds, all the gods, and all beings spring from this self (atman). Its hidden name (Upanishad) is 'The real behind the real,' for the real consists of the vital functions, and the self is the real behind the vital functions.

According to the Brihadaranyaka, this self travels through various worlds and takes up a body:

It is this person—the one that consists of perception among the vital functions (prana), the one that is the inner light within the heart. He travels across both worlds, being common to both. Sometimes he reflects, sometimes he flutters, for when he falls asleep he transcends this world, these visible forms of death. When at birth this person takes on a body, he becomes united with bad things, and when at death he leaves it behind, he gets rid of those bad things.

However, this self is not just something individual, since the Brihadaranyaka states:

When a chunk of salt is thrown in water, it dissolves into that very water, and it cannot be picked up in any way. Yet, from whichever place one may take a sip, the salt is there! In the same way this Immense Being has no limit or boundary and is a single mass of perception.

Furthermore, this self which is an imperishable reality and the "radiant and immortal person" in all things, cannot be grasped:

About this self (atman), one can only say 'not—, not—' (neti neti). He is ungraspable, for he cannot be grasped. He is undecaying, for he is not subject to decay. He has nothing sticking to him, for he does not stick to anything. He is not bound; yet he neither trembles in fear nor suffers injury.

And yet, it is only by reflecting on one's atman that one can gain knowledge:

You see, Maitreyi—it is one's self (atman) which one should see and hear, and on which one should reflect and concentrate. For by seeing and hearing one's self, and by reflecting and concentrating on one's self, one gains the knowledge of this whole world.

=== Brahman and Atman ===
Another term found in the Brihadaranyaka is Brahman, and this is closely associated with the term atman. According to the Brihadaranyaka, "in the beginning this world was only brahman, only one." Then Brahman, which was "not fully developed", created the "ruling power" among the gods and then it also created all the castes (brahmin, ksatriya, vaisya and shudra) as well Dharma.

According to the Brihadaranyaka there are "two visible appearances (rupa) of brahman":

- One form has a fixed shape, is mortal, stationary, this refers to the body as well as things in the external world
- the form other is without a fixed shape, is immortal and in motion. It also refers to "the person within the sun's orb" as well as to "breath and the space within the body". Furthermore, "the visible appearance of this person is like a golden cloth, or white wool, or a red bug, or a flame, or a white lotus, or a sudden flash of lightning."

The Brihadaranyaka also equates the world and Brahman with fullness and space (akasha):

The world there is full; the world here is full; fullness from fullness proceeds. After taking full from the full, it still remains completely full. Brahman is space. The primeval one is space. Space is windy.

According to the Brihadaranyaka, the atman is none other than Brahman itself, the ultimate truth and creative principle of the universe:

This self (atman) is the honey of all beings, and all beings are the honey of this self. The radiant and immortal person in the self and the radiant and immortal person connected with the body (atman)—they are both one's self. It is the immortal; it is brahman; it is the Whole. This very self (atman) is the lord and king of all beings. As all the spokes are fastened to the hub and the rim of a wheel, so to one's self (atman) are fastened all beings, all the gods, all the worlds, all the breaths, and all these bodies (atman).

Yajñavalkya also explains the Brahman with the phrase "the self within all is this self of yours," and this is said to be "the one who is beyond hunger and thirst, sorrow and delusion, old age and death." He also calls the Brahman-Atman the "inner controller, the immortal" which is present in earth, water (and other elements) but is different from them and controls them from within. This self "sees, but he can't be seen; he hears, but he can't be heard; he thinks, but he can't be thought of; he perceives, but he can't be perceived."

The Brihadaranyaka also describes "the highest Brahman" as "the heart," which is "the abode of all beings" and "the foundation of all beings." This brahman in the space of the heart is said to be "the controller of all, the lord of all, the ruler of all," and is not affected or changed by karma (action).

This brahman in the heart, also called Prajapati, is also described in the Brihadaranyaka as follows:

This person here is made of mind and consists of light. Lodged here deep within the heart, he is like a grain of rice or barley; he is the lord of all, the ruler of all! Over this whole world, over all there is, he rules.

Those who know the truth of brahman-atman become "calm, composed, cool, patient, and collected" and are not affected by evil or doubt. The text also states that those who are without desire will go to Brahman after death:

Now, a man who does not desire—who is without desires, who is freed from desires, whose desires are fulfilled, whose only desire is his self—-his vital functions (prana) do not depart. Brahman he is, and to brahman he goes.

=== Enumeration of the gods (3.9) ===
In the dialogue between Yājñavalkya and Vidagdha Śākalya (3.9.1), the Upanishad enumerates the gods as "three hundred and three, and three thousand and three", before progressively reducing them to thirty‑three, six, three, two, one‑and‑a‑half, and finally one.

=== Karma ===
One of the earliest formulation of the Karma doctrine occurs in the Brihadaranyaka which states:

'He's made of this. He's made of that.' What a man turns out to be depends on how he acts and on how he conducts himself. If his actions are good, he will turn into something good. If his actions are bad, he will turn into something bad. A man turns into something good by good action and into something bad by bad action. And so people say: 'A person here consists simply of desire.' A man resolves in accordance with his desire, acts in accordance with his resolve, and turns out to be in accordance with his action.

— Brihadaranyaka Upanishad, Hymns 4.4.5–4.4.6

=== Afterlife ===
The text also contains some speculations about the afterlife. In one passage, Yajñavalkya is asked what happens to a man who has died and he states that after death "a man turns into something good by good action (karma) and into something bad by bad action."

The Brihadaranyaka also describes how the atman leaves the body at death and takes up a new life. The text describes the process as follows:

As a caterpillar, when it comes to the tip of a blade of grass, reaches out to a new foothold and draws itself onto it, so the self (atman), after it has knocked down this body and rendered it unconscious, reaches out to a new foothold and draws itself onto it.

=== Ethics ===
The Brihadaranyaka includes hymns on virtues and ethics. In verse 5.2.3 it recommends three virtues: self-restraint (दमः, damah), charity (दानं, daanam), and compassion for all life (दया, daya).

तदेतत्त्रयँ शिक्षेद् दमं दानं दयामिति
Learn three cardinal virtues – temperance, charity and compassion for all life.

— Brihadaranyaka Upanishad, V.ii.3,

These basic Vedic ethical principles found in the Brihadaranyaka later developed into the more complex yamas (ethical rules) found in various schools of Hinduism.

=== Psychology ===
The verses in the Brihadaranyaka contain theories pertaining to psychology and human motivations. Verse 1.4.17 describes the desire for progeny as the desire to be born again. The Brihadaranyaka Upanishad states a behavioral theory that links action to one's nature, suggesting that behavioral habits shape a person:

According as one acts, so does he become.
One becomes virtuous by virtuous action,
bad by bad action.
— Brihadaranyaka Upanishad 4.4.5

Ancient and medieval Indian scholars have referred to the Brihadaranyaka Upanishad as a foundation for discussing psychological theories, the nature of psyche, and the interactions between body, mind, and Self. For example, Adi Shankara in his commentary on the Brihadaranyaka explains the relation between consciousness, the mind and the body.

Brihadaranyaka Upanishad asserts that the mind creates desire, with its basis rooted in pleasure. It states that the eye is the cause of material wealth, as wealth is created through sight, whereas the ears represent spiritual wealth, as knowledge is shared through listening. In the dialogue between Yajnavalkya and Maitreyi, husband and wife, the Upanishad suggests that one does not love an object for the sake of the object but for the sake of the subject, which is the Self (the Self of the other person).

=== Metaphysics ===
Verse 1.3.28 acknowledges that metaphysical statements in the Upanishads are meant to guide the reader from unreality to reality. The metaphysics of Brihadaranyaka Upanishad often presents a kind of non-dualism or monism. For instance, in verse 2.4.13 Yajñavalkya asserts that everything in the universe is the Self. Some passages state that Brahman is the whole:

Clearly, this self is brahman—this self that is made of perception, made of mind, made of sight, made of breath, made of hearing, made of earth, made of water, made of wind, made of space, made of light and the lightless, made of desire and the desireless, made of anger and the angerless, made of the righteous and the unrighteous; this self that is made of everything.

Upanishadic metaphysics is further elucidated in the Madhu-vidya (honey doctrine), where the essence of every object is described to be same to the essence of every other object. The Brihadaranyaka Upanishad looks at reality as being indescribable and its nature to be infinite and consciousness-bliss. The cosmic energy is thought to integrate in the microcosm and in the macrocosm as well as the individual and the universe.

=== Different interpretations ===
The Brihadaranyaka Upanishad has attracted secondary literature and commentaries (bhasya) from many scholars. In these secondary texts, the same passages have been interpreted in differently by various sub-schools of Vedanta, including Advaita (monism), Dvaita, and Vishistadvaita.

The phrase "neti, neti" (not this, not this) is a profound concept found in the Brihadaranyaka Upanishad, and it has been interpreted differently by Shankara and Ramanuja. Shankara interprets it as a negation of all empirical attributes and forms. According to Shankara, Brahman (ultimate reality) is beyond all distinctions and is the only true reality, and everything else is an illusion (maya). Ramanuja interprets "neti, neti" not as a complete negation but as an acknowledgment of limitations of human language and conceptualization when describing Brahman. This perspective emphasizes the infinite and glorious nature of the Divine, suggesting that the negation is more about the limitation of our understanding than about Brahman itself.

== Popular mantras ==
=== Pavamāna Mantra ===
This is from the Brihadaranyaka Upanishad (1.3.28)

असतो मा सद्गमय । Asatō mā sadgamaya
तमसो मा ज्योतिर्गमय । tamasō mā jyōtirgamaya
मृत्योर्मा अमृतं गमय । mr̥tyōrmā amr̥taṁ gamaya
ॐ शान्तिः शान्तिः शान्तिः ॥ Om śāntiḥ śāntiḥ śāntiḥ
– Br̥hadāraṇyakopaniṣat 1.3.28

Translation:

From untruth lead me to Truth.
From darkness lead me to Light.
From death lead me to Immortality.
Om Peace, Peace, Peace.

== Editions ==
- Albrecht Weber, The Çatapatha-Brāhmaṇa in the Mādhyandina-Çākhā, with extracts from the commentaries of Sāyaṇa, Harisvāmin and Dvivedānga, Berlin 1849, reprint Chowkhamba Sanskrit Ser., 96, Varanasi 1964.
- Willem Caland, The Śatapatha Brāhmaṇa in the Kāṇvīya Recension, rev. ed. by Raghu Vira, Lahore 1926, repr. Delhi (1983)
- Émile Senart, Brihad-Aranyaka Upanishad, Belles Lettres (1967) ISBN 2-251-35301-1
- TITUS online edition (based on both Weber and Caland)
- Sivananda Saraswati, The Brihadaranyaka Upanishad: Sanskrit text, English translation, and commentary. Published by Divine Life Society, 1985.

== Translations ==
- Robert Hume, Brihadaranyaka Upanishad, Oxford University Press
- Max Müller, The Upanishads – includes Brihadaranyaka, The Sacred Books of the East – Volume 15, Oxford University Press
- Radhakrishnan, Sarvepalli (1994) [1953]. The Principal Upanishads. New Delhi: HarperCollins Publishers India. ISBN 81-7223-124-5.
- Swami Madhavananda, Brihadaranyaka Upanishad
- Brihadaranyaka Upanishad, Translations by Johnston, Nikhilānanda, Madhavananda
- The Brihadaranyaka Upanishad (with the Commentary of Śaṅkarācārya) original Sanskrit and English translation

== In literature ==
Poet T. S. Eliot makes use of the story "The Voice of the Thunder" and for the source of "datta, dayadhvam, and damyata" found in the Brihadaranyaka Upanishad. Sections of the story appear in his poem The Waste Land under part V "What the Thunder Said".

== Sources ==
- Deussen, Paul (1980a). Sixty Upanishads of the Veda. Vol. 1. Motilal Banarsidass Publishing House. ISBN 978-81-208-1468-4.
- Deussen, Paul (1980b). Sixty Upanishads of the Veda. Vol. 2. Motilal Banarsidass Publishing House. ISBN 978-81-208-1469-1.
- Muller, F. Max (1884). The Sacred Books of the East: The Upanishads Part. 2. Vol. XV. Oxford University Press.
- Olivelle, Patrick (1998). The Early Upanishads: Annotated Text and Translation. Oxford University Press, USA. ISBN 978-0-19-512435-4.
