= Vijay Madhavan =

Indian dancer

Vijay Madhavan is an Indian classical dancer.

== Early years and education ==
A disciple of Chitra Visweswaran, Madhavan showed an acumen for classical dance from a young age. He received a degree in Zoology and obtained full-time work as a software product analyst prior to leaving the business world to concentrate fully on Bharatanatyam.

== Bharatanatyam ==
In addition to owning his own dance school, he is also face of Jaya TV where he performs to the Bharathiyar song senthamizh nadenum pothinilae each morning. He is a regular performer in the Bhagavata Mela Natakams and in August 2002 he won the Vasanthalakshmi - Narasimhachari Endowment Award for Talent Promotion.

== Personal life ==
Madhavan is married to carnatic vocalist Sumitra Vasudev, a disciple of Vidushi Vedavalli
