= Madhavaram (East) =

- village
- Interactive map of Madhavaram
- Location in Andhra Pradesh, India
- Coordinates: 16.88870866421126°N 80.71079963077118°E
- Country: India
- State: Andhra Pradesh
- District: NTR

Government
  - Body: Village Panchayat

Population
  - Total: 1,204

Languages
  - Official: Telugu
- Time zone: UTC+5:30 (IST)
- ISO 3166 code: IN-AP
- Vehicle registration: AP
- Nearest city: Vijayawada
- Website: ap.gov.in

Madhavaram, is a village in NTR district in the state of Andhra Pradesh in India. This village's demographic has significant contributions to the Indian armed forces. Referred to as Military Madhavaram for its strong military tradition, the village has a legacy of service dating back to the colonial era, with many residents serving in both World Wars. Today, it remains a hub for recruitment into the Indian military, with around 250 soldiers currently serving. Madhavaram is also home to a war memorial, a tribute to its servicemen and their sacrifices.

== Culture ==
The local culture highly values military service, with many families across generations taking pride in enlisting. This tradition has led the Indian Defense Ministry to recognize Madhavaram's unique status and plan the establishment of an Army Training Center in the village. Additionally, the local Poleramma temple holds a special place in the community, as residents believe its blessings protect the servicemen on the battlefield.

== Demographics ==
Total Number of Household : 320
Population	Persons	Males	Females
Total	1,204	602	602
In the age group 0–6 years	113	54	59
Scheduled Castes (SC)	551	276	275
Scheduled Tribes (ST)	98	50	48
Literates	649	362	287
Illiterate	555	240	315
Total Worker	684	402	282
Main Worker	682	400	282
Main Worker - Cultivator	47	43	4
Main Worker - Agricultural Labourers	549	293	256
Main Worker - Household Industries	2	2	0
Main Worker - Other	84	62	22
Marginal Worker	2	2	0
Marginal Worker - Cultivator	0	0	0
Marginal Worker - Agriculture Labourers	1	1	0
Marginal Worker - Household Industries	0	0	0
Marginal Workers - Other	1	1	0
Marginal Worker (3-6 Months)	2	2	0
Marginal Worker - Cultivator (3-6 Months)	0	0	0
Marginal Worker - Agriculture Labourers (3-6 Months)	1	1	0
Marginal Worker - Household Industries (3-6 Months)	0	0	0
Marginal Worker - Other (3-6 Months)	1	1	0
Marginal Worker (0-3 Months)	0	0	0
Marginal Worker - Cultivator (0-3 Months)	0	0	0
Marginal Worker - Agriculture Labourers (0-3 Months)	0	0	0
Marginal Worker - Household Industries (0-3 Months)	0	0	0
Marginal Worker - Other Workers (0-3 Months)	0	0	0
Non Worker	520	200	320
