= Madhav (film) =

2022 Indian film

- Directed by: Hetal Thakkar
- Written by: Jigar Rana
- Produced by: Vivek Thakkar
- Starring: Hitu Kanodia
- Cinematography: Subrat K Khatoi
- Edited by: Vivek Thakkar; Parth Y Bhatt
- Music by: Mehul Surti; Parth Bharat Thakkar
- Release date: 14 October 2022
- Country: India
- Language: Gujarati

Madhav is an Indian Gujarati-language action film produced by Vivek Thakkar and directed by Hetal Thakkar, starring Hitu Kanodia in the lead with an ensemble supporting cast. Mehul Surti and Parth Bharat Thakkar composed the film's songs and background score.

== Premise ==
A high-profile advocate is infamous for his malpractices. A police officer churns out a strategy to expose the advocate. What follow next are a series of events that lead to an interesting climax.

== Cast ==
- Hitu Kanodia as Madhav Sinh Jadeja
- Mehul Buch as Vishwas Desai
- Chetan Dahiya
- Vishal Shah
- Saloni Shah
- Lajja Desai as News Anchor
- Tushar Dave as journalist rahul
