= Madhu-vidya =

- Samkhya: Kapila
- Yoga: Patanjali
- Vaisheshika: Kaṇāda, Prashastapada
- Secular: Valluvar

Madhu-vidya is described in the Brihadaranyaka Upanishad II.v.1-19, and in the Chandogya Upanishad III 1-5. Madhu-vidya or 'Honey-knowledge' is that of the supreme Bliss of the Self; it is an important Vedic teaching. This knowledge is meant to be communicated by the teacher to the disciple, by father to the son – who is worthy and inwardly ready. Indra taught Madhu-vidya to Rishi Dadhichi with a warning that it should not be communicated to anyone else.

== Vedic background ==
In the Rig Veda, Soma, the Vedic symbol for deep spiritual truth, is addressed as Madhu, the nectar or ambrosia, the drink of Immortality sought by both gods and men. Rishi Vamadeva has described how the saving of the knowledge of Madhu or Soma Doctrine came to him through a hawk in a sudden flash in his darkest hour.

It is believed that Rishi Dadhichi had his ashrama in Dudheshwara on the banks of Sabarmati River near present-day Ahmedabad. His name appears in the Rig Veda. Dadhichi was a sage of Vedic repute (Rig Veda I.84.13: इन्द्रो दधीचो अस्थ भिर्वृत्राण्यप्रतिष्कुतः| जघान नवतीर्नव ||). He was the son of Rishi Atharvan of the Atharvaveda, and the father of Pippalada of the Prasna Upanishad. His name is seen to occur in the first Mandala of the Rig Veda, and in the Bhagavata Purana. Rishi Kakshivana, the sage of the Rig Veda Sukta 119 which is addressed to the Ashvins, in Mantra 9 tells us :

उत स्या वां मधुमन्मक्षिकारपन्मदे सोमरयौशिजा हुवन्यति |
युवं दधीचो मन आ विवास्थोऽथा शिरः प्रति वामश्व्यं वदत् ||

"The bee desirous of honey sang praise-song for you. Aushij in delight of Soma tells how Dadhichi, told you the secret of his mind after the head of his horse was cured."

== Dadhichi's exposition ==
Dadhichi knew the secret of the Madhu-vidya; he held the doctrine of the mutual interdependence of things, because all things are indissolubly connected in and through the Self. As all the spokes are contained between the axle and felly of a wheel, all things and all selves are connected in and through the Supreme Self. Nothing exists that is not covered by the Supreme Self. Thus, he taught the doctrine of the supreme existence of the one, and the apparent existence of the many. Dadhichi states that the sun is surely the honey of the gods. Of it, heaven is surely the bent bamboo. The intermediate-space is the hive. The rays are the off-springs. Of that sun, those which are the eastern rays, they themselves are its eastern cells. The Rk-mantras are verily the bees. The Rig Veda is indeed the flower. Those waters are the nectars. They, which are verily these Rk-mantras – heated up this Rig Veda. From that which was heated up issued the juice in the form of fame, lustre, vigours of organs, strength, and eatable food. It flowed profusely and settled on a side of the sun. That verily is this, which is the red appearance (aspect) of the sun. Thus, he begins narrating the scheme of colours – red, white and black which are the different colours of the sun, and concludes that the Vedas indeed are the nectars.`

== Significance ==
Madhu-vidya occupies a unique place in the Upanishadic scheme of upasana, due to its supremely hidden significance and peculiarly mystic presentation. Chandogya Upanishad takes the Sun as the main symbol and works out the vidya thereon; Brihadaranyaka Upanishad depicts a long series of cause and effect, showing their mutual interdependence and finally leads to the Atman which is shown to be the supreme source of everything else. Sankara takes madhu to mean effect, and he also accepts the primary sense of delight. The effects that flow are not mere imaginary things but are actualities that become visualised; every effect takes shape in a particular form or colour which signifies its concretisation and completion but the essence or the honey has no particular form or colour because it happens to be beyond all manifestations; it is recognized by the heaving at the centre of the Sun. Chandogya Upanishad concludes by saying that, to him, who gains this knowledge, there dawns the eternal day. In the case of Brihadaranyaka Upanishad, the search for the essence begins with the earth, the essence of all bhutas or creatures, the effects of the earth and essence are identical. All physical, moral and psychical principles make up man who in turn produces these principles, beyond man is the composite self of body, mind etc., the producer of all this – this Brahman is the Atman, the very self of the seeker; nothing exists apart from it, everything is of the nature of everything.

== Implication ==
Madhu-vidya establishes the following five truths:-

1) The correspondence and interrelationships between the elements of the external world and the individual beings are analogous to those existing between the honey and the bees.
2) There is only one supreme god and that is Brahman. All the divine powers witnessed in the macrocosm (the external world) and the microcosm (the individual being), are but his manifestations. Brahman behind the cosmic universe is same as the Atman underlying the individual self.
3) Brahman exists within each and every element of the external universe and also within the individual beings as their essence (Dharma or law). He is immanent through and through. The idea of transcendent God separate from the external universe and the individual is rejected.
4) The eternal laws governing the union of the two fundamental principles – Annam ('matter') and the prana ('life-breath') – and the interaction between the elements of the macrocosm and the microcosm and the evolutions from these interactions and unions are also Brahman.
5) Brahman is an integral whole and unity like a wheel; in Brahman are held together all the elements of the external universe, all worlds, all divinities and all breathing creatures.

Chandogya Upanishad (III.i.1) begins teaching Madhu Vidya by stating – The Sun is verily honey to the Devas (Vasus, Rudras, Adityas, Maruts and Sadhyas), the Heaven is like the cross-beam, the intermediate region is the beehive; and the rays are the sons. But, this vidya does not teach meditation on Devas but on Brahman who is also known by the names Devas are known; it is a Brahma-vidya.

The bondage that is experienced as individuals is due to the emphasis on individuality rather than the task, and independently on the cause which is organically connected by the same Atman that is present in both; the essence of the Madhu-vidya is the cosmic contemplation of the reality of Prana within and Vayu outside, and the correlation with the Universal Consciousness.

== Tantra sadhana ==
Transformation of Jiva into Shiva is the goal of Tantra sadhana; Jiva is Shiva in the state of bondage due to samskaras whose increase must be halted for attaining release. When a sadhaka takes initiation he learns the art of stopping further increase of samskaras. This art is known as Madhu-vidya whose practice burns the seed of samskaras and paves the path for liberation.
