= Madhavaram (West) =

- village
- Interactive map of Madhavaram
- Location in Andhra Pradesh, India
- Coordinates: 16.908356375845223°N 80.69473987368173°E
- Country: India
- State: Andhra Pradesh
- District: NTR

Government
  - Body: Village Panchayat

Population
  - Total: 1,502

Languages
  - Official: Telugu
- Time zone: UTC+5:30 (IST)
- ISO 3166 code: IN-AP
- Vehicle registration: AP
- Nearest city: Vijayawada
- Website: ap.gov.in

Madhavaram, is a village in NTR district in the state of Andhra Pradesh in India.

== Demographics ==
Total Number of Household : 408
Population	Persons	Males	Females
Total	1,502	775	727
In the age group 0–6 years	177	93	84
Scheduled Castes (SC)	5	3	2
Scheduled Tribes (ST)	423	212	211
Literates	654	378	276
Illiterate	848	397	451
Total Worker	933	470	463
Main Worker	901	460	441
Main Worker - Cultivator	50	47	3
Main Worker - Agricultural Labourers	833	397	436
Main Worker - Household Industries	0	0	0
Main Worker - Other	18	16	2
Marginal Worker	32	10	22
Marginal Worker - Cultivator	2	2	0
Marginal Worker - Agriculture Labourers	25	3	22
Marginal Worker - Household Industries	0	0	0
Marginal Workers - Other	5	5	0
Marginal Worker (3-6 Months)	28	7	21
Marginal Worker - Cultivator (3-6 Months)	1	1	0
Marginal Worker - Agriculture Labourers (3-6 Months)	24	3	21
Marginal Worker - Household Industries (3-6 Months)	0	0	0
Marginal Worker - Other (3-6 Months)	3	3	0
Marginal Worker (0-3 Months)	4	3	1
Marginal Worker - Cultivator (0-3 Months)	1	1	0
Marginal Worker - Agriculture Labourers (0-3 Months)	1	0	1
Marginal Worker - Household Industries (0-3 Months)	0	0	0
Marginal Worker - Other Workers (0-3 Months)	2	2	0
Non Worker	569	305	264
