= Madhavaram, Mudinepalle =

Madhavaram
- village
- Location in Andhra Pradesh, India
- Coordinates: 16.4134697°N 81.103207°E
- Country: India
- State: Andhra Pradesh
- District: Eluru

Government
  - Body: Village Panchayat

Population
  - Total: Uninhabited

Languages
  - Official: Telugu
- Time zone: UTC+5:30 (IST)
- ISO 3166 code: IN-AP
- Vehicle registration: AP
- Nearest city: Vijayawada
- Website: ap.gov.in

Madhavaram, is an uninhabited village in Eluru district in the state of Andhra Pradesh in India.
