= Venkatamadhava =

Venkata Madhava (11th century) was an Indian commentator (bhashyakar) on the Rigveda.

== Biography ==
Venkata Madhava provided biographical details about himself at the end of the first chapter of his first commentary. According to his account, his father was Venkatarya and his mother was Sundari. He belonged to the Kaushika gotra and resided in the Chola region. He had two sons, Venkata and Govinda.

== Works and views ==
Some scholars hypothesize that Venkata Madhava wrote two commentaries on the Rigveda. His commentary is titled Rigarthadipika (Ṛgarthadīpikā), which is relatively short and primarily defines individual words within the mantras.

Throughout his work, Venkata Madhava made frequent references to Brahmana texts, asserting that these works are essential for comprehending the deeper or hidden meanings of the Vedas. He composed a notable verse regarding the degree to which different scholars understand the Rigveda:

According to this verse, scholars who limit their studies strictly to Nirukta (etymology) and Vyakarana (grammar) grasp only a quarter (one-fourth) of the meaning of the Rigveda Samhita. In contrast, scholars who take the effort to analyze the Brahmana texts and understand linguistic nuances are able to comprehend and explain the complete meaning of the Vedas.

Venkata Madhava advocated for giving due importance to Brahmana texts in order to interpret Vedic literature accurately. Experts view his commentaries as highly useful for understanding the meaning of Vedic mantras.
