= Madhavaram, Ponneri =

Madhavaram
- village
- Location in Tamil Nadu, India
- Coordinates: 13.341311321797152°N 80.08837502205954°E
- Country: India
- State: Tamil Nadu
- District: Thiruvallur

Government
  - Body: Village Panchayat

Population
  - Total: 788

Languages
  - Official: Tamil
- Time zone: UTC+5:30 (IST)
- ISO 3166 code: IN-TN
- Vehicle registration: TN
- Nearest city: Chennai
- Website: tn.gov.in

Madhavaram is a village in Ponneri Taluk, Thiruvallur district in the state of Tamil Nadu in India.

== Demographics ==
Total Number of Household : 205
Population	Persons	Males	Females
Total	788	394	394
In the age group 0–6 years	114	55	59
Scheduled Castes (SC)	217	107	110
Scheduled Tribes (ST)	23	9	14
Literates	560	295	265
Illiterate	228	99	129
Total Worker	331	234	97
Main Worker	305	231	74
Main Worker - Cultivator	20	12	8
Main Worker - Agricultural Labourers	59	37	22
Main Worker - Household Industries	0	0	0
Main Worker - Other	226	182	44
Marginal Worker	26	3	23
Marginal Worker - Cultivator	0	0	0
Marginal Worker - Agriculture Labourers	1	0	1
Marginal Worker - Household Industries	0	0	0
Marginal Workers - Other	25	3	22
Marginal Worker (3-6 Months)	2	2	0
Marginal Worker - Cultivator (3-6 Months)	0	0	0
Marginal Worker - Agriculture Labourers (3-6 Months)	0	0	0
Marginal Worker - Household Industries (3-6 Months)	0	0	0
Marginal Worker - Other (3-6 Months)	2	2	0
Marginal Worker (0-3 Months)	24	1	23
Marginal Worker - Cultivator (0-3 Months)	0	0	0
Marginal Worker - Agriculture Labourers (0-3 Months)	1	0	1
Marginal Worker - Household Industries (0-3 Months)	0	0	0
Marginal Worker - Other Workers (0-3 Months)	23	1	22
Non Worker	457	160	297
