= Madhavaram, Nandyal =

Madhavaram
- village
- Location in Andhra Pradesh, India
- Coordinates: 15.32170112453193°N 77.94827751612524°E
- Country: India
- State: Andhra Pradesh
- District: Nandyal
- Mandal: Peapully

Government
  - Body: Village Panchayat

Population
  - Total: 2,825

Languages
  - Official: Telugu
- Time zone: UTC+5:30 (IST)
- ISO 3166 code: IN-AP
- Vehicle registration: AP
- Nearest city: Dhone
- Website: ap.gov.in

Madhavaram, is a village in Peapally mandal, Nandyal district in the state of Andhra Pradesh in India.

== Demographics ==
Total Number of Household : 631
Population	Persons	Males	Females
Total	2,825	1,381	1,444
In the age group 0–6 years	351	180	171
Scheduled Castes (SC)	541	259	282
Scheduled Tribes (ST)	2	1	1
Literates	1,106	663	443
Illiterate	1,719	718	1,001
Total Worker	1,655	851	804
Main Worker	1,522	804	718
Main Worker - Cultivator	293	166	127
Main Worker - Agricultural Labourers	1,024	482	542
Main Worker - Household Industries	11	4	7
Main Worker - Other	194	152	42
Marginal Worker	133	47	86
Marginal Worker - Cultivator	8	4	4
Marginal Worker - Agriculture Labourers	84	31	53
Marginal Worker - Household Industries	4	0	4
Marginal Workers - Other	37	12	25
Marginal Worker (3-6 Months)	131	45	86
Marginal Worker - Cultivator (3-6 Months)	7	3	4
Marginal Worker - Agriculture Labourers (3-6 Months)	83	30	53
Marginal Worker - Household Industries (3-6 Months)	4	0	4
Marginal Worker - Other (3-6 Months)	37	12	25
Marginal Worker (0-3 Months)	2	2	0
Marginal Worker - Cultivator (0-3 Months)	1	1	0
Marginal Worker - Agriculture Labourers (0-3 Months)	1	1	0
Marginal Worker - Household Industries (0-3 Months)	0	0	0
Marginal Worker - Other Workers (0-3 Months)	0	0	0
Non Worker	1,170	530	640
