= Madhavaram, Gummidipoondi =

Madhavaram
- village
- Location in Tamil Nadu, India
- Coordinates: 13.360788018730675°N 80.00126293342048°E
- Country: India
- State: Tamil Nadu
- District: Thiruvallur

Government
  - Body: Village Panchayat

Population
  - Total: Uninhabited

Languages
  - Official: Tamil
- Time zone: UTC+5:30 (IST)
- ISO 3166 code: IN-TN
- Vehicle registration: TN
- Nearest city: Chennai
- Website: tn.gov.in

Madhavaram, is a village in Gummidipoondi Taluk, Thiruvallur district in the state of Tamil Nadu in India.

== Demographics ==
Total Number of Household : 0
Population	Persons	Males	Females
Total	0	0	0
In the age group 0–6 years	0	0	0
Scheduled Castes (SC)	0	0	0
Scheduled Tribes (ST)	0	0	0
Literates	0	0	0
Illiterate	0	0	0
Total Worker	0	0	0
Main Worker	0	0	0
Main Worker - Cultivator	0	0	0
Main Worker - Agricultural Labourers	0	0	0
Main Worker - Household Industries	0	0	0
Main Worker - Other	0	0	0
Marginal Worker	0	0	0
Marginal Worker - Cultivator	0	0	0
Marginal Worker - Agriculture Labourers	0	0	0
Marginal Worker - Household Industries	0	0	0
Marginal Workers - Other	0	0	0
Marginal Worker (3-6 Months)	0	0	0
Marginal Worker - Cultivator (3-6 Months)	0	0	0
Marginal Worker - Agriculture Labourers (3-6 Months)	0	0	0
Marginal Worker - Household Industries (3-6 Months)	0	0	0
Marginal Worker - Other (3-6 Months)	0	0	0
Marginal Worker (0-3 Months)	0	0	0
Marginal Worker - Cultivator (0-3 Months)	0	0	0
Marginal Worker - Agriculture Labourers (0-3 Months)	0	0	0
Marginal Worker - Household Industries (0-3 Months)	0	0	0
Marginal Worker - Other Workers (0-3 Months)	0	0	0
Non Worker	0	0	0
