= Madhavaram, Prakasam =

Madhavaram
- village
- Location in Andhra Pradesh, India
- Coordinates: 15.727700555695257°N 79.85000478099192°E
- Country: India
- State: Andhra Pradesh
- District: Prakasam

Government
  - Body: Village Panchayat

Population
  - Total: 2,439

Languages
  - Official: Telugu
- Time zone: UTC+5:30 (IST)
- ISO 3166 code: IN-AP
- Vehicle registration: AP
- Nearest city: Vijayawada
- Website: ap.gov.in

Madhavaram, is a village in Prakasam district in the state of Andhra Pradesh in India.

== Demographics ==
Total Number of Household : 635
Population	Persons	Males	Females
Total	2,439	1,226	1,213
In the age group 0–6 years	327	171	156
Scheduled Castes (SC)	805	402	403
Scheduled Tribes (ST)	69	38	31
Literates	1,142	710	432
Illiterate	1,297	516	781
Total Worker	1,322	720	602
Main Worker	1,124	680	444
Main Worker - Cultivator	291	204	87
Main Worker - Agricultural Labourers	669	329	340
Main Worker - Household Industries	2	0	2
Main Worker - Other	162	147	15
Marginal Worker	198	40	158
Marginal Worker - Cultivator	10	4	6
Marginal Worker - Agriculture Labourers	98	16	82
Marginal Worker - Household Industries	0	0	0
Marginal Workers - Other	90	20	70
Marginal Worker (3-6 Months)	183	36	147
Marginal Worker - Cultivator (3-6 Months)	8	4	4
Marginal Worker - Agriculture Labourers (3-6 Months)	90	15	75
Marginal Worker - Household Industries (3-6 Months)	0	0	0
Marginal Worker - Other (3-6 Months)	85	17	68
Marginal Worker (0-3 Months)	15	4	11
Marginal Worker - Cultivator (0-3 Months)	2	0	2
Marginal Worker - Agriculture Labourers (0-3 Months)	8	1	7
Marginal Worker - Household Industries (0-3 Months)	0	0	0
Marginal Worker - Other Workers (0-3 Months)	5	3	2
Non Worker	1,117	506	611
