= Madhavaram, Yadamari =

Madhavaram
- village
- Location in Andhra Pradesh, India
- Coordinates: 13.162501946674187°N 79.06773523815049°E
- Country: India
- State: Andhra Pradesh
- District: Chittoor

Government
  - Body: Village Panchayat

Population
  - Total: 2,443

Languages
  - Official: Telugu
- Time zone: UTC+5:30 (IST)
- ISO 3166 code: IN-AP
- Vehicle registration: AP
- Nearest city: Yadamari
- Website: ap.gov.in

Madhavaram, is a village in Yadamari Taluk, Chittoor district in the state of Andhra Pradesh in India.

== Demographics ==
Total Number of Household : 661
Population	Persons	Males	Females
Total	2,443	1,262	1,181
In the age group 0–6 years	221	107	114
Scheduled Castes (SC)	1,395	719	676
Scheduled Tribes (ST)	2	0	2
Literates	1,745	1,001	744
Illiterate	698	261	437
Total Worker	899	664	235
Main Worker	654	578	76
Main Worker - Cultivator	143	132	11
Main Worker - Agricultural Labourers	342	307	35
Main Worker - Household Industries	11	9	2
Main Worker - Other	158	130	28
Marginal Worker	245	86	159
Marginal Worker - Cultivator	115	6	109
Marginal Worker - Agriculture Labourers	51	32	19
Marginal Worker - Household Industries	21	12	9
Marginal Workers - Other	58	36	22
Marginal Worker (3-6 Months)	212	64	148
Marginal Worker - Cultivator (3-6 Months)	115	6	109
Marginal Worker - Agriculture Labourers (3-6 Months)	32	22	10
Marginal Worker - Household Industries (3-6 Months)	16	7	9
Marginal Worker - Other (3-6 Months)	49	29	20
Marginal Worker (0-3 Months)	33	22	11
Marginal Worker - Cultivator (0-3 Months)	0	0	0
Marginal Worker - Agriculture Labourers (0-3 Months)	19	10	9
Marginal Worker - Household Industries (0-3 Months)	5	5	0
Marginal Worker - Other Workers (0-3 Months)	9	7	2
Non Worker	1,544	598	946
