= Madhavaram, Annamayya =

Madhavaram
- village
- Location in Andhra Pradesh, India
- Coordinates: 14.057445674708523°N 78.6389588335446°E
- Country: India
- State: Andhra Pradesh
- District: Annamayya

Government
  - Body: Village Panchayat

Population
  - Total: 5,585

Languages
  - Official: Telugu
- Time zone: UTC+5:30 (IST)
- ISO 3166 code: IN-AP
- Vehicle registration: AP
- Nearest city: Kadapa
- Website: ap.gov.in

Madhavaram, is a village in Rayachoti mandal, Annamayya district in the state of Andhra Pradesh in India.

== Demographics ==
Total Number of Household : 1415
Population	Persons	Males	Females
Total	5,585	2,814	2,771
In the age group 0–6 years	745	394	351
Scheduled Castes (SC)	333	179	154
Scheduled Tribes (ST)	0	0	0
Literates	2,628	1,635	993
Illiterate	2,957	1,179	1,778
Total Worker	2,716	1,672	1,044
Main Worker	2,539	1,606	933
Main Worker - Cultivator	1,241	874	367
Main Worker - Agricultural Labourers	1,055	543	512
Main Worker - Household Industries	6	3	3
Main Worker - Other	237	186	51
Marginal Worker	177	66	111
Marginal Worker - Cultivator	20	8	12
Marginal Worker - Agriculture Labourers	118	28	90
Marginal Worker - Household Industries	0	0	0
Marginal Workers - Other	39	30	9
Marginal Worker (3-6 Months)	166	61	105
Marginal Worker - Cultivator (3-6 Months)	20	8	12
Marginal Worker - Agriculture Labourers (3-6 Months)	109	24	85
Marginal Worker - Household Industries (3-6 Months)	0	0	0
Marginal Worker - Other (3-6 Months)	37	29	8
Marginal Worker (0-3 Months)	11	5	6
Marginal Worker - Cultivator (0-3 Months)	0	0	0
Marginal Worker - Agriculture Labourers (0-3 Months)	9	4	5
Marginal Worker - Household Industries (0-3 Months)	0	0	0
Marginal Worker - Other Workers (0-3 Months)	2	1	1
Non Worker	2,869	1,142	1,727
