= Hoon Tari Heer =

2022 Indian Gujarati film

- Directed by: Dhwani Gautam
- Written by: Dhwani Gautam; Rajat Bhatia; Prem Gadhavi; Aditi Varma
- Produced by: Sameer Upadhyay; Disha Upadhyay; Dr. Jayesh Pavra
- Starring: Puja Joshi; Bharat Chawda; Ojas Rawal
- Cinematography: Suraj C Kurade
- Music by: Rahul Munjariya
- Production companies: Destination Yours; Pavra Entertainment; Dhwani Gautam Films
- Distributed by: Rupam Entertainment Pvt Ltd
- Release date: 7 October 2022
- Running time: 145 minutes
- Country: India
- Language: Gujarati

Hoon Tari Heer is a 2022 Gujarati-language film, directed by Dhwani Gautam starring Puja Joshi, Bharat Chawda, Ojas Rawal and others produced by Sameer Upadhyay, Disha Upadhyay and Dr Jayesh Pavra and distributed by Rupam Entertainment Pvt Ltd.

== Plot ==
Heer, a small town girl faces taboos in her community to meet her man of dreams. she faces all odds to live a life of her choice and why can't a girl live with her parents like boys do and still be considered as a stranger in her own home.

== Cast ==
- Puja Joshi
- Bharat Chawda
- Ojas Rawal
- Dharmesh Vyas
- Surabhi Zaveri Vyas
- Nisarg Trivedi
- Sonali Lele Desai
- Mansi Bhadiyadra

== Development ==
The film has been shot in Gondal, India, Vilnius, Lithuania, and Barcelona, Spain. This is the first film in Gujarati which got shot in Eastern Europe. Director Dhwani Gautam reveals the first look of the poster in December 2021. and announce the project and begun the India shot. The second schedule of the movie begun in the month of February 2022 in Europe. Legendary singer Sairam Dave, Kirtidan Gadhvi, Geeta Rabari, Aishwarya Majmudar Meet Jain, Bhoomi Trivedi, Nakash Aziz, Jigardan Gadhavi has given the voices. The music has been composed by Rahul Munjariya. The teaser of the film released in August 2022 starting and has been appreciated by the audience. The trailer got released on end of August 2022 and crossed more than a million views. The poster released on starting of September, along with the Dhol Vage song. The film was released on 7 October 2022.

== Soundtrack ==
Hoon Tari Heer

Studio album by Rahul Munjariya, Sairam Dave, Kirtidan Gadhvi, Geeta Rabari, Jigardan Gadhavi, Aishwarya Majmudar, Nakash Aziz, Meet Jain, Bhoomi Trivedi, Geeta Zala
- Released: 30 August 2022
- Genre: Feature film soundtrack
- Label: Pavra Entertainment

=== Tracklist ===
The soundtrack of the album is composed by Rahul Munjariya with lyrics written by Bhargav Purohit, Milind Gadhvi, Nandan Purohit, Jigardan Gadhavi, Devraj and Bharat. The soundtrack album consists of nine tracks.

No.	Title	Lyrics	Music	Singer(s)	Length
1.	"Yaad Satave"	Devraj and Bharat	Rahul Munjariya	Geeta Rabari	3:55
2.	"Oo Mari Heer"	Nandan Purohit	Rahul Munjariya	Jigardan Gadhavi	3:14
3.	"Dhol Vage"	Milind Gadhvi	Rahul Munjariya	Kirtidan Gadhvi & Aishwarya Majmudar	4:23
4.	"Dhol Vage - 2"	Milind Gadhvi	Rahul Munjariya	Kirtidan Gadhvi & Geeta Zala	3:09
5.	"Meharban"	Bhargav Purohit	Rahul Munjariya	Meet Jain	4:21
6.	"Heer Ranjha"	Nandan Purohit	Rahul Munjariya	Nakash Aziz	1:18
7.	"Lai Ja Re"	Jigardan Gadhavi	Rahul Munjariya	Jigardan Gadhavi	3:34
8.	"Sathi Male Na Male"	Nandan Purohit	Rahul Munjariya	Sairam Dave & Bhoomi Trivedi	3:34
9.	"Yaad Satave - Sad"	Devraj and Bharat	Rahul Munjariya	Rahul Munjariya	2:15
