= The Voice (Indian TV series) =

Indian singing talent show

- Also known as: The Voice India
- Genre: Reality television
- Created by: John de Mol Jr.
- Based on: The Voice franchise
- Presented by: Karan Tacker; Gunjan Utreja; Sugandha Mishra; Divyanka Tripathi
- Judges: Shaan; Himesh Reshammiya; Sunidhi Chauhan; Mika Singh; Salim Merchant; Neeti Mohan; Benny Dayal; A. R. Rahman; Armaan Malik; Harshdeep Kaur; Kanika Kapoor; Adnan Sami
- Country of origin: India
- Original language: Hindi
- No. of seasons: 3
- No. of episodes: 80

Production
- Producer: Deepak Dhar
- Production location: Mumbai
- Editor: Kumar Priyadarshi
- Camera setup: Multi-camera
- Running time: 40–45 minutes
- Production companies: Talpa; Endemol Shine India; Urban Brew Studios

Original release
- Network: &TV (1–2); StarPlus (3)
- Release: 6 June 2015 – 4 May 2019

Related
- The Voice Kids

The Voice is an Indian Hindi-language singing reality talent show, based on the original Dutch programme created by John de Mol Jr. and is part of a wider international franchise. The series employs a panel of four coaches who critique the artists' performances. Each coach guides their team of selected artists through the remainder of the season. They also compete to ensure that their act wins the competition, thus making them the winning coach.

The show first aired on 6 June 2015 on &TV and has aired for three seasons; it has produced three winners: Pawandeep Rajan, Farhan Sabir and Sumit Saini.

The first season of the series received positive reviews; one critic called the show "delightful", while another said that some of the participants on the show displayed fantastic singing. Due to the show's huge success, the channel announced a junior version which premiered on 23 July 2016.

== Format ==
The show is part of the television franchise The Voice and is structured as three phases: blind auditions, battle rounds and live performance shows.

=== The Blind Auditions ===
The first stage is the blind auditions, in which the four coaches, all noteworthy recording artists, listen to the contestants on chairs facing away from the stage so as to avoid seeing them. If a coach likes what they hear from that contestant, they press the "I WANT YOU" button to rotate their chairs to signify that they are interested in working with that contestant. If more than one coach presses their button, the contestant chooses the coach he/she wants to work with. In the 3rd season, a new twist called "Block" is featured, which allows one coach to block another coach from getting a contestant. The artist's journey on the show comes to an end if no coach selects him/her. The blind auditions end when each coach has a set number of contestants to work with. Coaches dedicate themselves to developing their singers mentally, musically and in some cases physically, giving them advice, and sharing the secrets of their success.

=== The Battle rounds ===
The contestants who successfully pass the blind auditions proceed to the battle rounds, where the coaches put two of their own team members against each other to sing the same song together in front of a studio audience. After the vocal face-off, the coach chooses only one to advance into the next knockout phase, the Super Battle round. A new element was added in season three; coaches were given one "steal", allowing each coach to select one individual who was eliminated during a battle round by another coach.

In the Super Battle round, each of the remaining 28 artists performs a solo on stage to compete with three/four others for a place in the Grand Gala round. The coach can choose only two from each of these performances to progress to the top sixteen and the Grand Gala round.

In the Grand Gala round, there is no elimination and contestants sing individually.

=== The Live Shows ===
In the final performance phase of the competition, the top contestants from each team compete against each other during a live broadcast. The television audience vote to save one contestant on each team, leaving the coach to decide on live television who they want to save and who will not move on. In the next round, the public chooses between the two artists left on each team, and the coach also has a vote that weighs equally with the public vote.

Finally, each coach has his/her best contestant left standing to compete in the finals, singing an original song. From these four, one is named "The Voice"—and receives a grand prize money.

== Production ==
The Voice India was created by John de Mol Jr. in the Netherlands and is based on the original Dutch series. de Mol then began to grow and expand The Voice competition franchise and on 6 June 2015, the Indian version of the show was launched on &TV. In April 2015, The Hollywood Reporter reported that &TV would broadcast The Voice in June 2015. Zee Entertainment Enterprises had bought the rights of the original version of the series from Talpa and John de Mol to telecast the Indian version of the show on &TV. The channel announced the series' premiere month as June 2015. &TV business head Rajesh Iyer said in a statement: "We are excited to present viewers with The Voice, a show which is already a global sensation, as one of our biggest non-fiction offerings." Talpa Media global managing director Maarten Meijs stated: "We are very pleased to be collaborating with &TV to bring The Voice to India." The show had been seen in 60 local productions in over 180 countries reach 500 million viewers worldwide.

In April 2015, &TV and show producer Endemol India and producer of South Africa's Urban Brew Studios announced leading Bollywood singers Himesh Reshammiya, Mika Singh, Shaan and Sunidhi Chauhan as the coaches for the first season and Karan Tacker as the host. In an interview with Mid-Day, Shaan said: "It's the most sought after show for any singer-musician. If you want to be on television and on a music show it has to be The Voice India." Endemol India and Urban Brew Studios SA announced that Terence Lewis would be choreographing the opening act for the premiere of the show.

On 30 July 2016, India Today reported that The Voice India would return with the second season. Shaan was again selected as the coach for the second season. Himesh Reshammiya, Mika Singh and Sunidhi Chauhan were replaced by Neeti Mohan, Salim Merchant and Benny Dayal.

In July 2018, the series was renewed for a third season and it was announced that the series is to be shifted from &TV to StarPlus as the channel sell its broadcasting rights to broadcast its onward seasons to StarPlus. In January 2019, Adnan Sami, Armaan Malik, Harshdeep Kaur and Kanika Kapoor were announced as the new mentors, with A. R. Rahman being the super judge. Asha Bhosle was introduced as the super judge for the final episode replacing A. R. Rahman.

== Coaches ==
Coaches of the third season of The Voice

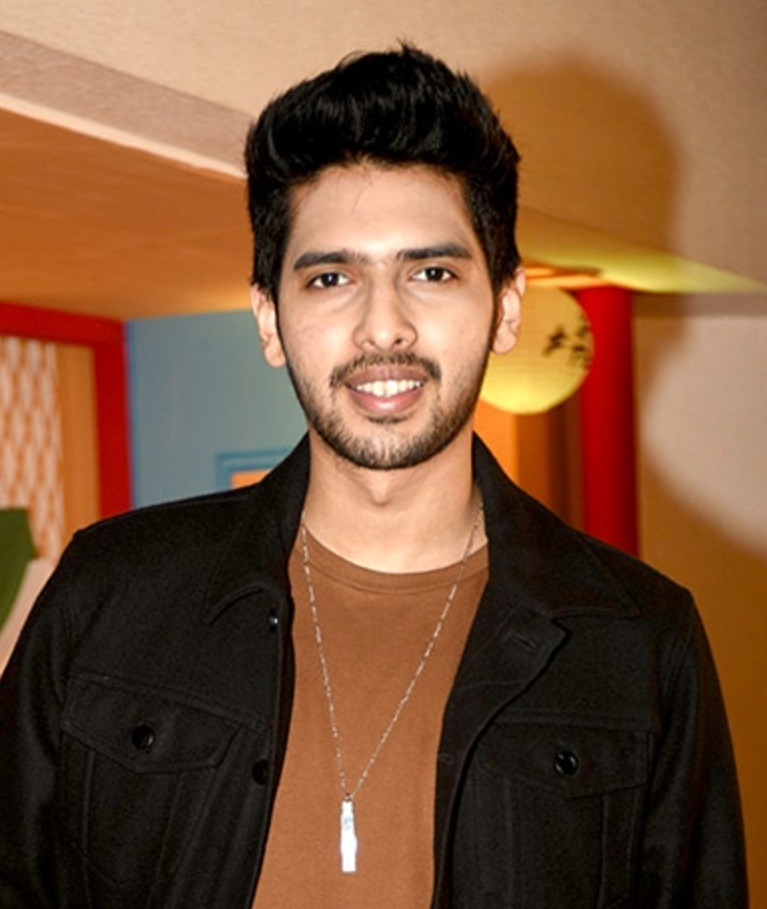
Armaan Malik

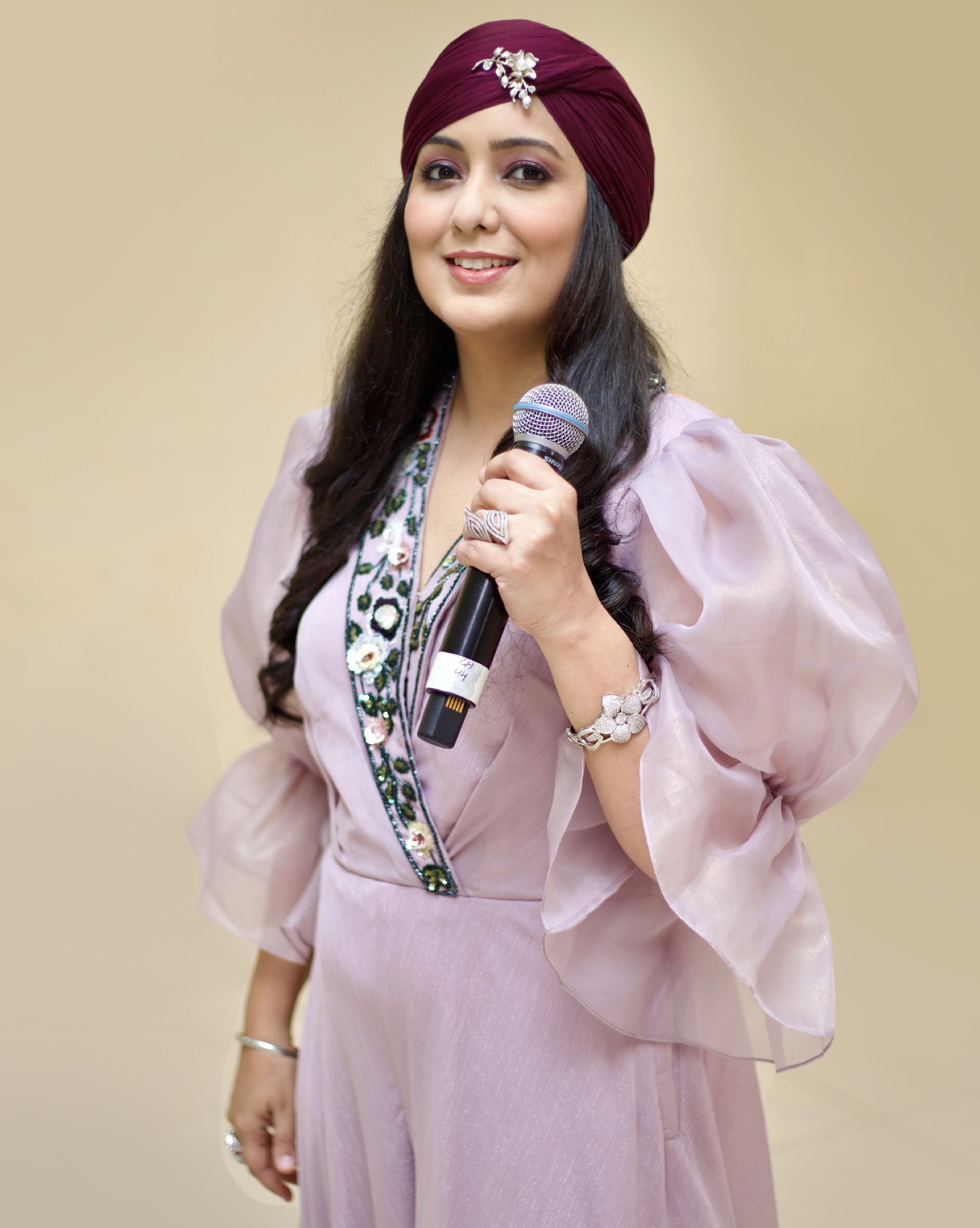
Harshdeep Kaur

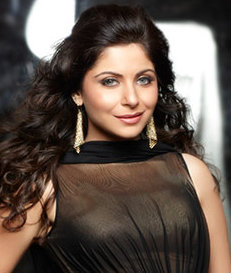
Kanika Kapoor

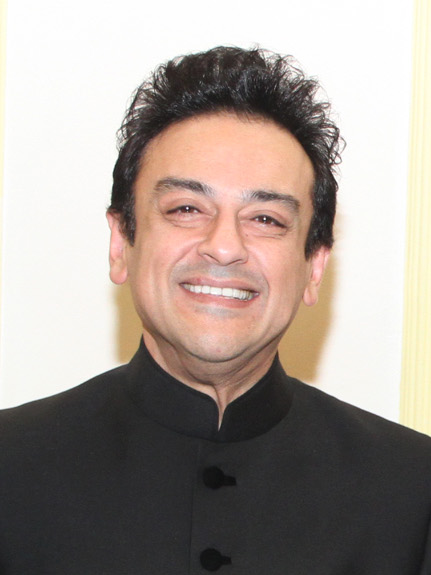
Adnan Sami

=== Coaches' teams ===
Winning coach; winners are denoted by boldface; finalists are italicised, and eliminated contestants are in small font

Season	Coaches and their finalists			
1	Himesh Reshammiya	Shaan	Sunidhi Chauhan	Mika Singh
1	Deepesh Rahi; Sachet Tandon; Piyush Ambhore; Sanjana Bhola; Anish Matthew; Sakshi Chauhan; Mona Bhatt	**Pawandeep Rajan**; Snigdhajit Bhowmik; Akash Ojha; Ritu Agarwal; Varsha Krishnan; Arpita Khan; Sana Aziz	Rishabh Chaturvedi; Vishva Shah; Parth Doshi; Shristi Bhandari; Oishwaryaa Chattui; Pragya Patra; Gopal Dass	Parampara Thakur; Sahil Solanki; Tanvir Singh; Passang Doma Lama; Jyotica Tangri; Harjot Kaur; Akshay Ghanekar
2	Salim Merchant	Neeti Mohan	Benny Dayal	Shaan
2	Paras Maan; Yashodhan Rao; Sharayu Date	Niyam Kanungo; Mohammad Danish; Neha Bhanushali	Rasika Borkar; Sona Vakil; Divyansh Verma	**Farhan Sabir**; Parakhjeet Singh; Neha Khankriyal
3	Armaan Malik	Harshdeep Kaur	Kanika Kapoor	Adnan Sami
3	Bandana Dutta; Rajat Hegde; Preetika Bhasin; Mayur Sukale	**Sumit Saini**; Hargun Kaur; Anikait; Mamta Raut	Nidhi Kohli; Tanisha Datta; Deepak Rana; Kaushik Kar	Adnan Ahmad; Simran Chaudhary; Arghyadeep Ghosh; Deepak Bharti

== Series overview ==
Colour key

Team Sunidhi
Team Himesh
Team Shaan
Team Mika

Team Salim
Team Neeti
Team Benny

Team Armaan
Team Harshdeep
Team Kanika
Team Adnan

Season	First aired	Last aired	Winner	Runner-up	3rd Place	4th Place	Winning coach	Presenters		Coaches (chairs' order)			
Season	First aired	Last aired	Winner	Runner-up	3rd Place	4th Place	Winning coach	Presenters		1	2	3	4
1	6 June 2015	30 Aug 2015	Pawandeep Rajan	Deepesh Rahi	Parampara Thakur	Rishabh Chaturvedi	Shaan	Karan Tacker		Himesh	Shaan	Sunidhi	Mika
2	10 Dec 2016	12 Mar 2017	Farhan Sabir	Niyam Kanungo	Parakhjeet Singh	Rasika Borkar	Shaan	Gunjan Utreja	Sugandha Mishra	Salim	Neeti	Benny	Shaan
3	3 Feb 2019	4 May 2019	Sumit Saini	Adnan Ahmad	Simran Chaudhary	Hargun Kaur	Harshdeep Kaur	Divyanka Tripathi		Armaan	Harshdeep	Kanika	Adnan

=== Season 1 (2015) ===
The coaches of the first season were Himesh Reshammiya, Shaan, Sunidhi Chauhan and Mika Singh, while Karan Tacker was the host. The season premiered on 6 June 2015 and concluded on 30 August 2015 (with 26 episodes), with Pawandeep Rajan being crowned as the winner. Deepesh Rahi was runner-up, followed by Parampara Thakur in third place and Rishabh Chaturvedi in fourth place.

Pawandeep received the grand prize money of ₹5 million (US$52,000) from &TV, a Maruti Alto K10 and a deal to record his first single with music label Universal Music Group. Thanking his coach Shaan, he said: "I would like to thank coach Shaan, who thought I was good enough to make the cut and mentored me wholeheartedly."

=== Season 2 (2016-2017) ===
In July 2016, it was reported that &TV would launch the second season of The Voice. Shaan was announced as returning coach; Neeti Mohan, Salim Merchant and Benny Dayal joined Shaan. Karan Tacker was replaced by Gunjan Utreja as the host of the season. Sugandha Mishra joined Utreja as the co-host. The season started airing on 10 December 2016 and concluded on 12 March 2017 (28 episodes), with Farhan Sabir being crowned as the winner. Rasika Borkar was runner-up, followed by Parakhjeet Singh in third place and Niyam Kanungo in fourth place.

Sabir received the grand prize money of ₹2.5 million (US$26,000) from &TV and a Maruti Alto K10 with Automatic Gear Shift. The top 4 finalists received a gift hamper from Alto and handsets from Vivo Camera and Music as well.

=== Season 3 (2019) ===
The new coaches of the third season were Adnan Sami, Armaan Malik, Harshdeep Kaur and Kanika Kapoor, with A. R. Rahman being the super judge, while Divyanka Tripathi was the new host. The season began airing on 3 February 2019 and concluded on 4 May 2019 (26 episodes), with Sumit Saini being crowned as the winner. Adnan Ahmad was the runner-up. Simran Chaudhary and Hargun Kaur were other finalists. Saini received the grand prize money of ₹2.5 million (US$26,000).

== Kids edition ==
Due to the huge success of The Voice India, in June 2016, &TV announced plans for a junior version of the show which would feature contestants between the ages of six and fourteen. It was announced that Sugandha Mishra and Jay Bhanushali will host the series, while Neeti Mohan, Shaan and Shekhar Ravjiani were declared as the coaches. The children's has the same format as the original show and began airing in July 2016.

== Reception ==
=== Season 1 ===
The Voice India received a positive reception from critics. Tulika Dubey of The Times of India, said that the judges on the show had brought variety to the panel, in terms of profile and expertise and called the show "delightful". She concluded by saying, "the winner of the finale stands to have a great career ahead." An India Today reviewer enjoyed the premiere episode, saying it had "drama, glitz and glamour", and concluded that "some of the participants on the show displayed fantastic singing." Rajyasree Sen of Firstpost, called it a "'wowtastic' show" and encouraged its readers to watch the show. Appreciating the show, she said that the focus of the show was actually on the talent.

The show earned high ratings for &TV and has become the most watched show on the channel. Raj Baddhan of website Biz Asia said, "The Voice India seems to be working a treat in UK ratings on &TV." The show pulled in 39,000 viewers – peaking at 59,800 viewers on the channel between 9 PM IST – 10 PM.

=== Season 2 ===
Anvita Singh of India Today liked the premiere episode and said that "the chemistry between the judges is fresh, young, and peppy." She concluded by saying that she can't wait for more to happen in the season. Karthika Raveendran of Bollywood Life gave the season a 3.5 rating out of 5 stars. Liking the new judging panel and contestants, she said that "the show is a must watch".

=== Season 3 ===
Divyanka Tripathi got rave reviews for her hosting skills and glam transformation on social media. An India Today reviewer liked the premiere episode, saying that "the show returned in a better avatar as the previous installments of The Voice India aired on &TV", and concluded that "the presence of Rahman added another dimension to the show".

== Awards ==
Award	Ceremony Date	Category	Nominees	Result	Ref(s)
Indian Telly Awards	28 November 2015	Best Judge	Himesh Reshammiya, Shaan, Mika Singh and Sunidhi Chauhan	Won	

== See also ==
- The Voice (franchise)
- List of programmes broadcast by &TV
- List of programmes broadcast by StarPlus
