= The Voice India Kids =

- Genre: Singing Reality competition
- Created by: John de Mol Jr.
- Presented by: Sugandha Mishra; Jay Bhanushali
- Judges: Papon (2); Shaan (1–); Palak Muchhal (2); Himesh Reshammiya (2–); Shekhar Ravjiani (1); Neeti Mohan (1, 3); Armaan Malik (3–); Harshdeep Kaur (3–)
- Opening theme: This is the Voice, The Voice Kids
- Country of origin: India
- Original languages: English; Hindi
- No. of seasons: 2
- No. of episodes: 64

Production
- Producer: Deepak Dhar
- Production locations: Mumbai, India
- Editor: Kumar Priyadarshi
- Camera setup: Multi-camera
- Running time: 45 minutes approx.
- Production company: Endemol India

Original release
- Network: &TV; StarPlus
- Release: 23 July 2016 – 11 March 2018

Related
- Superstar Singer; Indian Idol Junior

The Voice India Kids is an Indian singing reality competition television series that airs on &TV or StarPlus. The series is produced by Endemol India.

== Format ==
This show based on The Voice India. The show will allow young singers between the age group of 6–14 years to showcase their talent in front of a national audience. The show is part of The Voice franchise and is structured in three phases: Blind auditions, Battle rounds, and Live performance shows.

=== Blind auditions ===
The first stage is the blind auditions, where artists sing in front of the judges/coaches. In this round, each coach selects 15 singers for their team. Four coaches, all noteworthy recording artists, choose teams of contestants through a blind audition process. Each coach has the length of the auditioner's performance (about 90 seconds) to decide if they want the singer on their team. If one of the coaches is satisfied with the voice of an artist, and wants to mentor them for the next stage, they press the "I WANT YOU" button by their chair. This turns the chair around to face the stage, and allows the coach to see the artist for the first time after they have sung. This avoids any bias on the part of the judge/coach because of an artist's characteristics or personality. If two or more coaches want the same singer, the singer chooses their coach. The artist's journey on the show comes to an end if no coach selects them.

=== Battle rounds ===
Each team of singers is then mentored and developed by their coach in the second stage, called the Battle Round. The team coaches help to develop their artists by giving them advice, and sharing the secrets of their success in the music industry. The coaches have two of their own team members battle each other by singing the same song. The coach chooses which team member will advance to the next stage. The judges then have to choose from the individual "battles" which artists to take to the Live Round.[3]

=== Live shows ===
The third stage, Live Shows, is where the remaining seven members of each team perform solo and try to entertain the audience and to impress the judges. After Round 1, each of the coaches can save three contestants to progress. After Rounds 2 and 3, each coach can save two contestants to progress. After Round 4, each coach can save one contestant to progress to the semi-final round. The remaining contestants progress, or not, based on a public vote conducted after each round.

In the semi-finals, the final two contestants from each team face off against each other. The judges then split 100 points between the two performers of their team. The winner is decided by the combination of public votes received and points given by their respective judges.

== Coaches ==
- Neeti Mohan (Season 1)
- Shaan (Season 1–2)
- Shekhar Ravjiani (Season 1)
- Palak Muchhal (Season 2)
- Papon (Season 2)
- Himesh Reshammiya (Season 2)
- Samantha Jones (Season 3)

== Season summary ==
Colour key

Team Shaan
Team Neeti
Team Shekhar

Team Himesh
Team Palak
Team Papon

The Voice India Kids series overview
Season	First aired	Last aired	Winner	Runner-up	Third place	Fourth place	Winning coach	Hosts	Co-Hosts	Coaches (order)			
Season	First aired	Last aired	Winner	Runner-up	Third place	Fourth place	Winning coach	Hosts	Co-Hosts	1	2	3	4
1	July 23, 2016	Oct 23, 2016	Nishtha Sharma	Kavya Limaye	Pooja Insa	No fourth finalist	Neeti Mohan	Jay Bhanushali	Sugandha Mishra	Shaan	Neeti	Shekhar	No fourth coach
2	Nov 11, 2017	Mar 11, 2018	Manashi Saharia	Neelanjana Ray	Shruti Gosawmi	Mohammad Faazil	Palak Muchhal	Jay Bhanushali	No Co-Host	Shaan	Papon	Palak	Himesh

== Season 1 (2016) ==
Nishtha Sharma of Uttar Pradesh won the first edition of The Voice India Kids. She was the contestant from Team Neeti Mohan. She received a cheque of Rs 2,500,000, along with a recording contract from Universal Music. Kavya Limaye (Team Neeti) was the 1st runner up and Pooja Insa (Team Shaan) was the 2nd runner up of the season.

== Season 2 (2017–18) ==
Manashi Sahariah of Udmari, Assam won the second edition of The Voice India Kids. She was the contestant from Team Palak . She received a cheque of Rs. 2,500,000, along with a recording contract from Universal Music. The 1st runner up was Neelanjana Ray (Team Shaan) followed by Shruti Goswami (Team Papon). Both got a prize amount of Rs. 1,000,000 each.

=== Battles (Season 2) ===
The battles are the 2nd round of the show, where 3 singers from the same team sing the same song. Then the coach decides the winner, taking the singer to the 3rd round.

Contestants	Team	Winner
Shiba Prasad VS Sayyad Habibur VS Subhransh Mishra	Papon	Shiba Prasad
Shruti Goswami VS Pihu Srivastava VS Laxmi Srivastava	Papon	Shruti Goswami
Dhanni Saikiya VS Shekinah Mukhiya VS Gayatri Shinde	Himesh	Shekinah Mukhiya
Deblina Nath VS Anvita TS VS Manashi Sahariah	Palak	Manashi Sahariah
Asmi Mukherjee VS Sanjana Ganesh VS Niharika Nath	Papon	Niharika Nath
Tannishtha Puri VS Sonal Srivastava VS Anupama Mamgain	Papon	Tannishtha Puri
Supriyo Sinha VS Abhinav Dhiman VS Shaurya Negi	Shaan	Supriyo Sinha
Tanishka Sarkar VS Arya Nanda VS Ishaan Tangirala	Shaan	Ishaan Tangirala
Aashi Singh VS Aarohi Roy VS Priyadarshan Deka	Palak	Aarohi Roy
Rubab Choudhary VS Madhav Arora VS Satyajeet Debroy	Papon	Madhav Arora
Abhraman Kashyap VS Mansi Sisodia VS Neelanjana Ray	Shaan	Neelanjana Ray
Mohammad Faazil VS Tanish Kinalkar VS Sumeet Kumar VS Rajeev Das	Himesh	Mohammad Faazil
Bunty VS Siddhant Aggarwal VS Bhanu Pratap Singh	Palak	Bhanu Pratap Singh
Ayush Kotwal VS Moksh Gulati VS Ayush Kalam	Himesh	Moksh Gulati

=== Top 20 (Season 2) ===
Himesh's team	From
Mohammad Faazil	Jaipur, Rajasthan
Shekinah Mukhiya	Dehradun, Uttarakhand
Sneha Shankar	Mumbai, Maharashtra
Moksh Gulati	New Delhi
Anshika Chonkar	Mumbai, Maharashtra
Shaan's team	From
Neelanjana Ray	Alipurduar, West Bengal
Supriyo Sinha	Kolkata, West Bengal
Ishaan Tangirala	New Jersey, USA
Guntaas	Kanpur, Uttar Pradesh
Ankona Mukherjee	Kolkata, West Bengal
Palak's team	From
Manashi Sahariah	Udmari, Assam
Aarohi Roy	Kolkata, West Bengal
Shivansh Rana	New Delhi
Bhanu Pratap Singh	Gwalior, Madhya Pradesh
Shreemoyi Mondal	West Bengal
Papon's team	From
Shiba Prasad	Odisha
Tannishtha Puri	Lucknow, Uttar Pradesh
Madhav Arora	Zirakpur, Punjab
Niharika Nath	Agartala, Tripura
Shruti Gosawmi	Guwhati, Assam

=== Top 12 (Season 2) ===
Himesh's Team	From
Sneha Shankar	Maharashtra
Shekinah Mukhiya	Dehradun, Uttarkhand
Mohammad Faazil	Jaipur, Rajasthan
Shaan's Team	From
Neelanjana Ray	Alipurduar, West Bengal
Guntaas	Kanpur, Uttar Pradesh
Ishaan Tangirala	New Jersey, USA
Papon's Team	From
Niharika Nath	Agartala, Tripura
Tannishtha Puri	Lucknow, Uttar Pradesh
Shruti Goswami	Guwahati, Assam
Palak's Team	From
Manashi Sahariah	Udmari, Assam
Bhanu Pratap Singh	Gwalior, Madhya Pradesh
Shreemoyi Mondal	West Bengal

=== Top 6 (Season 2) ===
Contestant	Team
Mohammad Faazil	Himesh
Shekinah Mukhiya	Himesh
Guntaas	Shaan
Neelanjana Ray	Shaan
Manashi Sahariah	Palak
Shruti Goswami	Papon
