= Neeti Mohan =

Indian singer (born 1979)

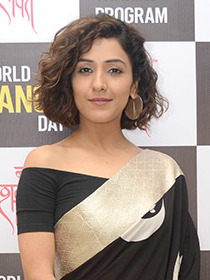
- Mohan in 2018
- Born: 18 November 1979 (age 46); Delhi, India
- Occupations: Singer; songwriter; composer
- Years active: 2003–present
- Spouse: Nihar Pandya (m. 2019)
- Children: 1
- Relatives: Shakti Mohan (sister); Mukti Mohan (sister)
- Musical career
- Genres: Pop; filmi; classical
- Instrument: Vocals

Neeti Mohan Sharma (born 18 November 1979) is an Indian singer. She sings mainly in Hindi films, but has also sung in Marathi, Telugu, Tamil, Kannada, Bengali, Punjabi and English. Born in Delhi, she was one of the winners of the Channel V's reality show Popstars, subsequently being chosen for Aasma, with other winners of the show. She rose to prominence after recording "Ishq Wala Love" for Student of the Year (2012), ultimately winning the Filmfare R. D. Burman Award for New Music Talent and was nominated for the Best Female Playback Singer for "Jiya Re" from Jab Tak Hai Jaan (2012).

Her rendition of six jazz tracks in the soundtrack album of Amit Trivedi's Bombay Velvet (2015) received positive review from music critics. The following year, she received her second nomination for the Filmfare Award for Best Female Playback Singer for the song "Sau Aasmaan" from Baar Baar Dekho (2016). In that year, Mohan appeared as a coach in the 1st season of The Voice India Kids and the second season of The Voice India. Besides her career in music, she has also been involved in various charities and social causes.

== Early life and background ==
Neeti Mohan was born on 18 November 1979 in Delhi. Her father, Brij Mohan Sharma, is a government officer and her mother, Kusum, is a homemaker. Neeti Mohan is the eldest of four sisters; Shakti Mohan, Mukti Mohan and Kriti Mohan. Mohan began learning music at the Gandharva Mahavidyalaya. During the time, she was involved in dramatics and dancing; considering singing as a "serious hobby".

During her school days, Mohan was part of the school band, and participated in Delhi Republic Day parade for five years in a row. Convinced by her father, Mohan participated in many extra-curricular activities during her school: singing, dancing, performing in the band and theatre. She was adjudged best cadet in the National Cadet Corps of India and represented India as Youth Exchange Programme cadet. Later, she learnt music formally at the Bhatkhande Music Institute and continued training in Mumbai with Rajashree Pathak for five years. Apart from training in singing, Mohan studied dancing with her two sisters. She trained in Bharata Natyam and Kathak under the supervision of Ashley Lobo. Besides training kids to dance, Mohan worked as an instructor there. Mohan graduated in philosophy from Miranda House, University of Delhi.

In 2003, Mohan was one of the winners of Channel V's reality television show Popstars, subsequently being chosen for Aasma—a pop group formed with the other winners of the show—where she got the chance to perform with Bryan Adams, insisted by Deepak Gattani, who manages A. R. Rahman's concert tours. While she was assisting Lobo, he suggested Mohan to Imtiaz Ali for a supporting role in his film, Socha Na Tha (2005), while Lobo was working as the choreographer in the film. In 2009, Mohan participated in the Star Plus show Music Ka Maha Muqqabla, where she was part of the winning team "Shankar's Rockstars" led by Shankar Mahadevan. She married actor Nihaar Pandya on 15 February 2019. The couple announced their first pregnancy on 15 February 2021 on their second wedding anniversary, and she later gave birth to a boy.

In an interview with TV host Amin Dhillon that had over 400K views, Mohan shared the untold story on how A. R. Rahman discovered her. Mohan's sister Shakti was performing as a dancer at a A. R. Rahman show for New Year's Eve in 2006. Shakti had called Mohan right before the show and Mohan had wished to speak to Rahman but didn't get a chance. Instead she told her sister that one day she would be performing with Rahman and six months later, Mohan was singing with him. Mohan had previously met Rahman's manager when she was part of the group Aasma and in 2007, Mohan bumped into him again when he was coming out of the cinema. It was at this chance meeting Mohan learned Rahman and his team were auditioning new voices for his US tour. She recorded a vocal audition, singing "Maya Maya" from the film Guru among other songs. After 3 weeks, Mohan got a call from Rahman's manager informing her that Rahman liked her voice and she was picked for the tour.

== Career ==
=== 2012–14: Breakthrough with Student of the Year and Jab Tak Hai Jaan ===
Mohan made her Bollywood debut with the Vishal–Shekhar-composed Student of the Year (2012), where she performed the soft-ballad "Ishq Wala Love", along with Salim Merchant and Shekhar Ravjiani. She was next heard in the peppy track "Jiya Re" from Jab Tak Hai Jaan which was composed by A. R. Rahman. Mohan believed that Rahman called her for recording the song, since she has shown "a lot of spirit" in the shows she did with him, and the song features a girl—played by Anushka Sharma—enacting the song "very spunky". Koimoi's Shivi mentioned that Mohan's "refreshing voice delivers the track with lot of enthusiasm and variations". Though "Ishq Wala Love" was released earlier, Mohan's first recorded Hindi song was "Jiya Re". both songs were declared chartbusters upon release. For her work in both the songs, Mohan won the Filmfare R. D. Burman Award for New Music Talent, in addition to her first nomination for the Best Female Playback Singer for the song "Jiya Re". Besides, Mohan provided the chorus along with Natalie Di Luccio in Raghav Sachar-composed "Bittoo Sab Ki Lega" from Bittoo Boss, released the same year. During the year, she released her first single, titled "Ja Ja"; composed and written by Mohan, assisted by her father.

The following year, Mohan lent her voice for Ayushmann Khurrana's Punjabi track, "Saadi Galli Aaja", co-composed, co-written and co-sung by Khurana. Since Mohan does not speak Punjabi, she had to learn to pronounce the words before recording the song. Koimoi stated that Mohan "mesmerizes" the listeners in the unplugged version of the song, with her "husky voice". Mohan performed the track "Kashmir Main Tu Kanyakumari" for the Vishal–Shekhar composed Chennai Express, along with Sunidhi Chauhan and Arijit Singh. Besides, she worked with Vishal–Shekhar for two other projects; Gippi and Gori Tere Pyaar Mein, where she recorded "Dil Kaagzi" for the former and "Naina" for the latter. While Mohan and Rashid Ali were performing in a Rahman's concert show, he came up with the idea to bring a duet between the two, since "both shares similar vocal texture". Hence, she did playback for Sonam Kapoor in Raanjhanaa (2013) in the song "Nazar Laaye". Mohan had to bring the "softness" in her voice to match the "definite attitude" in Kapoor's persona for her character.

Mohan's first release of 2014 was the Sohail Sen-composed "Tune Maari Entriyaan" in Gunday. Sung along with Bappi Lahiri, Vishal Dadlani and KK, the song was a critical and commercial success, being placed at position 8 in "The Times of India Radio Mirchi Top 10 songs" of the year. Moreover, Mohan along with Aditi Singh Sharma performed an electronic dance music styled "Pinacolada" from Darr @ The Mall, marketed as the first Gothic Bollywood song. Mohan collaborated again with Khurrana in Raghu Dixit's "Khamakhaan" from Bewakoofiyaan, where The Indian Express affirmed that the song is "owned by Mohan from the moment she breathes into it in the beginning without any instruments". Apart from rendering Sajid–Wajid's "Galat Baat Hai" from Main Tera Hero, for which Rajiv Vijayakar of Bollywood Hungama considered Mohan's vocals "spirited", she lent to voice for "Kambal Ke Neeche" from the Ismail Darbar-composed Kaanchi. Mohan described the latter as a "family song" since it features two of her sisters; Shakti Mohan and Mukti Mohan in the video.

During the year, Mohan worked with Himesh Reshammiya for four films; The Xposé, Humshakals, Kick and Action Jackson. Aishwarya from Koimoi felt that Mohan's talent was "misused" in the songs "Catch Me If You Can" and "Dard Dilo Ke" from The Xposé. Similar sentiments were echoed for the songs "Caller Tune" and "Look Into My Eyes" from Humshakals, where Aishwarya stated, "Mohan did not show any variation that fans know she is capable of, as far as this album is concerned". However, "Tu Hi Tu" from Kick was critically acclaimed; Devesh Sharma from Filmfare wrote: "Mohan brings a young girl's yearning in her breezy rendition and makes her version a winner too". Besides, Mohan collaborated with Jeet Gannguli for the first time with the song "Darbadar" from CityLights. Producer of the film, Mukesh Bhatt wanted a "young Asha Bhosle", hence she had to "fix" her "tone and projection" for the song. Likewise, Mohan was roped in by Vishal–Shekhar for Bang Bang! and Happy New Year, where the title track for the former and "India Waale" for the latter were commercially successful. Besides, Mohan provided backing vocals for the track "Makhna", featuring Sukhwinder Singh in the Rahman-composed American film Million Dollar Arm.

=== 2015–present: Bombay Velvet, Baar Baar Dekho and beyond ===
Mohan's biggest release of 2015 came with Amit Trivedi's Bombay Velvet, where she performed six jazzy tracks for the album. Trivedi was in search of a voice with an "Asha Bhosle meets Nina Simone" tonal quality for Anushka Sharma's jazz singer character Rosie in the film, when he considered Mohan as the choice. According to The Indian Express, "what has worked" in the song "Mohabbat Buri Bimari" is Mohan's extemporisation in the middle of the track—with all the hiccups, laughs and squeals in place. The film marks the first time she read a script before recording a track to the respective film. "I was asked to sing just like how I would perform live". She recorded the songs at the studio dressed like a jazz singer, with people around her to cheer her. For another track "Dhadaam Dhadaam", Mohan was locked up in a room and was asked to "feel the pain of someone who's going through a break-up". Describing her time recording the song, she said; "I ran a fever after that song and you can almost hear the tear in my voice towards the end". Additionally, Mohan recorded a track titled "Naak Pe Gussa" for the film, which was inspired by K. M. Nanavati v. State of Maharashtra case. Mohan again collaborated with Trivedi in Shaandaar where she performed both "Nazdeekiyaan" and "Senti Wali Mental" for the film.

During the year, she teamed up with Ankit Tiwari for "Aalif Se" in Mr. X and worked with Shankar–Ehsaan–Loy for "Sarfira" in Katti Batti, where R. M. Vijayakar from India West stated that "Mohan stand out as the best thing in the film's soundtrack". She collaborated with Rahman for the Tamil song "Mersalaayitten" included in the soundtrack of I, performed along with Anirudh Ravichander. According to International Business Times, Mohan "chips in" by rendering the title word in a "porsche" way. Later the year, Mohan was roped in to perform the song "Neeyum Nannum" from Naanum Rowdy Dhaan which was composed and co-sung by Ravichander. She earned her first nomination for the Filmfare Award for Best Female Playback Singer – Tamil for the song. Besides she performed a low-pitch song "Kohila" from Ko 2, co-sung and composed by Leon James. She was then heard in a Himesh Reshammiya's composition; "Tod Tadaiyya" from Prem Ratan Dhan Payo. The last release of the year featured Mohan in an Amaal Mallik composition; a recreation of the song "Tumhe Apna Banane Ka" from Sadak (1991). Included in the album Hate Story 3, she performed the song along with Armaan Malik. Applauding Mohan's rendition of the song, composer Mallik noted; "I made her sing completely baritone [with this song]. I made her sing like a sensuous goddess. She evoked a voice she never knew she had". On International Women's Day, she released her single "Udne De" which was composed, sung and co-written by herself, as a dedication to all women in the wake of the Nirbhaya incident.

The following year, Mohan collaborated with Reshammiya in two other films; Sanam Teri Kasam and Teraa Surroor. "Haal-E-Dil" from the former received acclaim from critics. India West praised Mohan in their review of the music album; "Her resonant timber moves to soothing and back to haunting in an instant with enviable skill". She garnered her second Filmfare nomination for Best Female Playback Singer for the song "Sau Aasmaan" from Baar Baar Dekho. Composed by Mallik, the song was critically appreciated while Suanshu Khurana in her review wrote: "Mohan sing it in a voice we haven’t heard before—slightly operatic and falsetto singing". Apart from singing songs for films, Mohan performed alongside Mohit Chauhan in a music video of the TV show Yeh Hai Aashiqui and the duo was featured in some of the episodes in the series as musical narrators. She was also part of the music reality show The Voice India Kids as one of the mentors, along with Shaan and Shekhar Ravjiani. In the year end, she served as a coach in the second season of the Indian reality talent show The Voice.

In 2017, Mohan recorded "Khoobsurat Star Parivaar" alongside Jubin Nautiyal. She also performed two songs for the web series titled "Mixtape" produced by music label T-Series. The fusion of "Dua" from Shangai and "Saware" from Phantom, performed along with Salim Merchant was received positively among critics. In spite of featuring in the single "Man Marziyan" she was heard in several tracks recorded for films. She was heard in an upbeat composition by Rahman, along with Arjun Chandy and Savithri R Prithvi for the soundtrack album Ok Jaanu. Titled "Jee Lein", it received mixed reviews from critics. She was next heard in the Chirantan Bhatt's composed romantic track "Bawra Mann" performed with Nautiyal. The song was originally recorded for Singh Is Bliing (2015), but used in the soundtrack album Jolly LLB 2 (2017), since it did not match with the theme of the former. Mohan collaborated with Pritam and Rochak Kohli for two albums; Jab Harry Met Sejal and Lucknow Central respectively, where she performed the song "Raula" with Diljit Dosanjh for the former. Additionally, she contributed to the music album of Baadshaho by performing a retro-contemporary fused item song "Piya More" with Mika Singh for an Ankit Tiwari-composition and also by recording the recreated version of "Keh Doon Tumhe" from Deewaar (1975). Titled "Socha Hai", it was removed from the film due to problems with music rights while "Piya More" was also altered slightly due to the legalities, since it does sounds "similar to what Tiwari has palmed off to another producer". In 2017 December, she voiced both speaking and singing parts of Rapunzel in the Hindi dub of Tangled: Before Ever After. In January 2019, she sang for the series T-series Electrofolk where she was seen alongside Payal Dev performing the track "Aaoge Jab". January 2019, Mohan released her single "Kithe reh gaya", which was shot in Amritsar and was her first video in which she herself danced. April 2019 saw her with two releases- "Aithey Aa" from the film Bharat and "First Class" from the film Kalank. She also recorded two T-series mixtapes one with Shekhar Ravjiani and one with Vishal Dadlani. In February 2020, she (along with Aparshakti Khurana & Shekhar Ravjiani) hosted the 12th edition of Mirchi Music Awards Ceremony . In November 2020, she voiced the character of ‘Queen Poppy’ from Hindi dubbed version of popular animated musical comedy ‘Trolls World Tour’. Neeti has sung three songs for the character of Poppy that have been sung by Anna Kendrick in the English version - Koi Geet Gao (romantic track), Iss Pal Ko Jio (peppy rock track) & Trolls Toh Karenge Fun (peppy title track).

== Artistry ==
=== Voice and musical style ===
Regarding Mohan's voice type, The Indian Express wrote that she has a "high-pitched", "raw" vocal structure. According to Amitabh Bhattacharya, Mohan's voice has the "right kind of jazz sensibilities with a certain Hindustaniyat". Mohan mentioned that her classical training taught her how to approach a song in "different octaves". She explored more about texture of voice and harmony through her time at Aasma. Complimenting her Jazz vocals in Bombay Velvet, The Indian Express stated "If "Ka Kha Gha" shows Mohan's range, "Dhadam Dhadam" gets melancholy a voice". During her career, she performed various genres of songs, though she loves "singing melodies the most". In an interview, Mohan expressed her keen to explore bhajans.

=== Influence ===
Mohan has said that from childhood she has been influenced by Lata Mangeshkar, Asha Bhosle and Kishore Kumar. She considered Mangeshkar as her "greatest teacher for playback", while she credited A. R. Rahman for making her sustain her standard; "He is a task master but he gets the best out of you. His standards are very high, be it a recording or live performance". Mohan has also been influenced by many artists outside the country. She considered herself as a fan of John Mayer for his inspiring style of writing lyrics. Mohan credits the 1971 released song "Imagine" by John Lennon for inspiring on achieving her dreams with the "right kind of dedication".

== Philanthropy ==
Besides her career in music, Mohan has also contributed to various charities. In October 2014, she performed at the "Hum Hain Umeed E Kashmir" concert in Ballia, in an appeal for donation to support rehabilitation of those who suffered during the Kashmir flood. The same month, Mohan took part in the musical concert held in New Delhi for raising funds for the flood affected people of Assam. In June 2016, she performed at Smile Foundation's charity gala dinner, to support the cause of empowerment of underprivileged children and youth. In January 2017, she collaborated with United Nations on a project aimed at empowering women, ending human trafficking and promoting gender equality. Her single "Udne De" was selected for the United Nations Voluntary Trust Fund Project titled "Music to Inspire-Artists united against Human Trafficking".

== Discography ==
- "Ishq Wala Love" – Student of the Year (2012)
- "Jiya Re" – Jab Tak Hai Jaan (2012)
- "Nazar Laaye" – Raanjhanaa (2013)
- "Darbadar" – CityLights (2014)
- "Tu Hi Tu" – Kick (2014)
- "Mohabbat Buri Bimari" – Bombay Velvet (2015)
- "Sapna Jahan" – Brothers (2015)
- "Haal–E–Dil" – Sanam Teri Kasam (2016)
- "Nainowale Ne" – Padmaavat (2018)
- "First Class" – Kalank (2019)
- "Dil Udd Ja Re" – Pagglait (2021)
- "Meri Zindagi Hai Tu" – Satyameva Jayate 2 (2021)
- "Meri Jaan" – Gangubai Kathiawadi (2022)
- "Fitoor" + "Kaale Naina" – Shamshera (2022)
- "Hadd Kar De" – Samrat Prithviraj (2022)
- "Pari" – Dobaaraa (2022)
- "Chal Tere Ishq Me" - Gadar 2 (2024)

== Filmography ==
=== Film ===
Year	Title	Role	Notes	Ref(s)
2005	Socha Na Tha	—N/a	Cameo appearance	
2015	Bombay Velvet	Bombay Velvet customer	Cameo appearance	

=== Television ===
Year	Title	Role	Notes	Ref.
2003	Coke V Popstar 2	Contestant	1st Place	
2010	Music Ka Maha Muqqabla	Contestant	Winner Team	
2016	Yeh Hai Aashiqui (Season 4)	Herself	Musical narrator	
2016	The Voice India Kids	Herself	Judge/Coach	
2016	The Voice India (Season 2)	Herself	Judge/Coach	
2016	The Voice India Kids	Herself	Judge/Coach	
2019	The Kapil Sharma Show (Season 2)	Herself	Guest	
2019	Rising Star (Season 3)	Herself	Judge	
2019	Khatra Khatra Khatra	Herself	Guest	
2022	Sa Re Ga Ma Pa Li'l Champs 2022	Judge		
2023	Sa Re Ga Ma Pa Hindi 2023	Judge		

== Awards and achievements ==
Year	Category	Nominated work	Nominated For	Result	Ref(s)
Filmfare Awards
2013	R. D. Burman Award	"Ishq Wala Love"	Student of the Year	Won	
2013	R. D. Burman Award	"Jiya Re"	Jab Tak Hai Jaan	Won	
2013	Best Female Playback Singer	"Jiya Re"	Jab Tak Hai Jaan	Nominated	
2016	Best Female Playback Singer	"Sau Aasman"	Baar Baar Dekho	Nominated	
Screen Awards
2013	Best Female Playback Singer	"Jiya Re"	Jab Tak Hai Jaan	Nominated	
Stardust Awards
2016	Best Playback – Female	"Sau Aasman"	Baar Baar Dekho	Nominated	
GiMA Awards
2015	Best Duet	"Bang Bang" (along with Benny Dayal)	Bang Bang!	Nominated	
2016	Best Duet	"Tumhe Apna Banane Ka" (along with Armaan Malik)	Hate Story 3	Nominated	
Mirchi Music Awards
2013	Upcoming Female Vocalist of The Year	"Jiya Re"	Jab Tak Hai Jaan	Won	
2018	Indie Pop Song of the Year	"Man Marziyan"	–	Won	
2019	Female Vocalist Of The Year	"Nainowale Ne"	Padmaavat	Nominated	
Filmfare Awards South
2016	Best Female Playback Singer – Tamil	"Neeyum Naanum"	Naanum Rowdy Dhaan	Nominated	
2017	Best Female Playback Singer – Tamil	"Chella Kutti"	Theri	Nominated	
2018	Best Female Playback Singer – Tamil	"Idhayame"	Velaikkaran	Nominated	
SIIMA
2016	Best Female Playback Singer	"Neeyum Naanum"	Naanum Rowdy Dhaan	Nominated	
2017	Best Female Playback Singer	"Idhayame"	Velaikkaran	Nominated	
IIFA Utsavam
2017	Best Female Playback Singer – Tamil	"Neeyam Naanum"	Naanum Rowdy Dhaan		
Nick KCA
2017	Dabur Best Smile		The Voice India Kids	Won	
2018	Best Female Singer	"Naino Wale Ne"	Padmaavat	Won	
2023	Best Female Singer	"Meri Jaan"	Gangubai Kathiawadi	Won	

== See also ==
- List of Indian playback singers
