= Veer-Isha Nu Seemant =

2022 Indian Gujarati film

- Veer-Isha Nu Seemant official poster
- Directed by: Neeraj Joshi
- Written by: Prakash Gowda
- Produced by: Dhruvin Dakshesh Shah
- Starring: Malhar Thakar; Puja Joshi
- Cinematography: Himanshu Dubey
- Music by: Kedar-Bhargav
- Production company: Navkar Productions
- Distributed by: Rupam Entertainment Pvt Ltd
- Release date: 9 September 2022
- Running time: 125 minutes
- Country: India
- Language: Gujarati

Veer-Isha Nu Seemant is a 2022 Gujarati-language film, directed by Neeraj Joshi starring Malhar Thakar and Puja Joshi. It was produced by Dhruvin Dakshesh Shah and distributed by Rupam Entertainment. It was released on 9 September 2022.

== Plot ==
A couple decides not to have kids after their marriage but their families and society have expectations that make it difficult for the newlyweds. Will they stick to their plan?

== Cast ==
- Malhar Thakar
- Puja Joshi
- Anurag Prappana
- Chhaya Vora
- Feroz Bhagat
- Sonali Lele Desai
- Krunal Pandit
- Deepali Bhuta
- Rahul Rawal
- Vaibhav Biniwale
- Hem Sevak

== Soundtrack ==
Veer-Isha Nu Seemant

Studio album by Kedar-Bhargav
- Released: 21 August 2022
- Genre: Feature film soundtrack
- Label: Navkar Music

The soundtrack of the album is composed by Kedar - Bhargav with lyrics written by Bhargav Purohit. The soundtrack album consists of Two tracks. Three songs are released by Navkar Music.

No.	Title	Lyrics	Music	Singer(s)	Length
1.	"Maja Ma"	Bhargav Purohit	Kedar - Bhargav	Siddharth Amit Bhavsar & Vrattini Ghadge	2:14
2.	"Family Che"	Bhargav Purohit	Kedar - Bhargav	Meet Jain, Nayana Sarma, Shruti Modi, Pankaj Pathak	3.04

== Marketing and release ==
The official trailer was released on YouTube on 29 August 2022. The film was released on 9 September 2022.

== Reception ==
Rachana Joshi of Mid-day reviewed 2.5 out of 5. She praised the subject, social message and comic timings but criticised the story.
