= Puja Joshi =

Indian actress (born 1992)

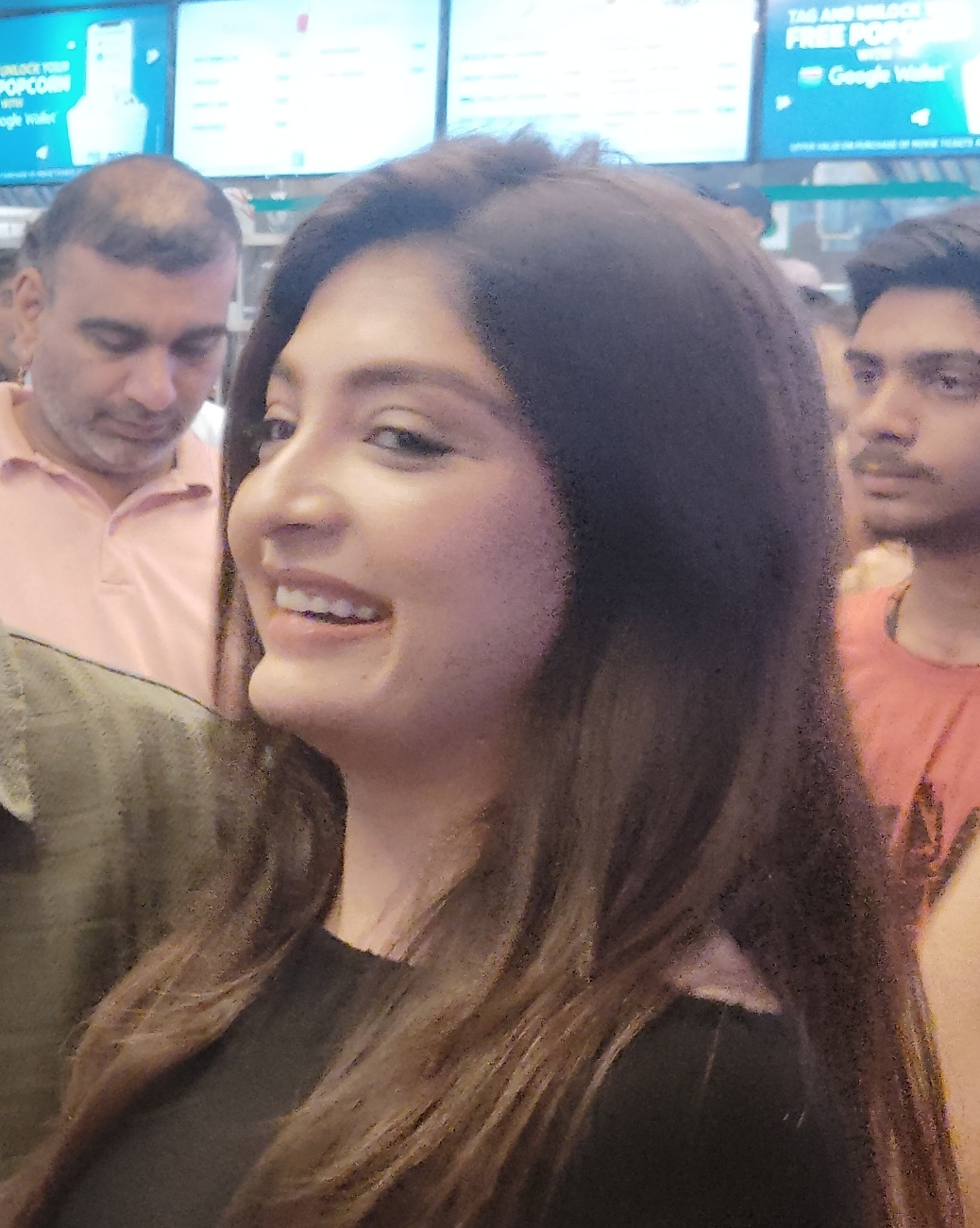
- Joshi in 2025
- Born: 28 June 1992 (age 34); Bombay, Maharashtra, India
- Occupation: Actress
- Known for: Kaal Bhairav Rahasya; Internet Wala Love; Hoon Tari Heer, Hu ane Tu
- Spouse: Malhar Thakar (m. 2024)

Puja Joshi (born 28 June 1992) is an Indian television actress.. She has done television shows like Kaal Bhairav Rahasya, which was based on his Tamil novel A Secret (Ragasiyamaga Oru Ragasiyam) which was aired on Star Bharat. She appeared as Gargi Patel on Channel V's The Buddy Project along with TV stars like Manav Gohil, and Internet Wala Love, which was aired on Colors TV. She is best known for her role of Charu Shashtri in Gujarati sitcom Aa Family Comedy Che which aired on Colors Gujarati and for her role as Kumkum in Colors Gujarati show Kumkum Na Pagla Padya.

She has also featured in Gujarati Films like Hoon Tari Heer, Hu ane Tu starring Siddharth Randeria, Lagan Special, Shastra & Jalso among many.

She also has featured in the promotional advertise of Sony Pal and Star Movies India. Puja tied knot with actor, Malhar Thakar on 26 November 2024.

== Early life and education ==
Puja Joshi was born and brought up in Mumbai to a Gujarati family. She comes from the family of a defence background and her father served in Indian Air Force. Puja has done her graduation from Mithibai College, Mumbai in Biotechnology.

== Television ==
Year	Show	Character	Channel	Language
2012-2014	The Buddy Project	Riya	Channel V India	Hindi
2014-2015	Aa Family Comedy Che	Charu Shashtri	ETV Gujarati	Gujarati
2015-2016	Kumkum Na Pagla Padya	Kumkum	Colors Gujarati	Gujarati
2017	Chutta Chedda Season 2	Anjali	Colors Gujarati	Gujarati (Release date : 27 February 2017)
2017-2018	Kaal Bhairav Rahasya	Preeti Prakash	Star Bharat	Hindi
2018-2019	Internet Wala Love	Aishwarya	Colors TV	Hindi

== Filmography ==
Year	Title	Character	Director	Language	Notes
2018	Aavu j Rehshe	-	Nitin Jani	Gujarati	Main Lead
2022	Jaysuk Zdpayo	Jigna	Dharmessh Mehta	Gujarati	Main Lead
2022	Veer-Isha Nu Seemant	Isha	Neeraj Joshi	Gujarati	Main Lead
2022	Hoon Tari Heer	Heer	Dhwani Gautam	Gujarati	Main Lead
2023	Hu ane Tu	Reva	Manan Sagar	Gujarati	Main Lead
2024	Lagan Special	Suman	Rahul Bhole & Vinit Kanojia	Gujarati	Main Lead
2024	Kale Lagan Che!?!	Ishika	Humayun Makrani	Gujarati	Main Lead
2025	Shastra	Vaidehi	Kartavya Shah	Gujarati	Main Lead
2025	Jalso - A Family Invitation	Astha	Rajiv S. Ruia	Gujarati	Main Lead
2025	Misri	Pooja	Kushal Naik	Gujarati	Cameo
2026	Vaanki Chuki Love Story	Tithi	Dhwani Gautam	Gujarati	Main Lead

=== Web series ===
Year	Title	Role	Language	Platform
2021	Vaat Vaat Ma	Pahel	Gujarati	ShemarooMe
2021	Benaqaab	Anushka Sheshadri	Gujarati, Hindi dubbed	ShemarooMe
2022	Vaat Vaat Ma Returns	Pahel	Gujarati	ShemarooMe
2024	Yuddh	Anahita	Gujarati	ShemarooMe
2024	Vaat Vaat Ma Adla Badli	Khushi	Gujarati	ShemarooMe

== Music videos ==
Year	Title	Music label	Co-Starring
2020	Unko Apne Kareeb Dekha Tha	Zee Music Company	Hiroo Thadani (Singer as well)
2021	Valamiya 2.0	Sur sagar music	Geeta Rabari (singer) and Anshul Trivedi
2021	Megha	Soul Beats Official	Kirtidan Gadhvi (Singer) and Bhavin Bhanushali

== Awards and nominations ==
Awards and nominations include:

Year	Award	Category	Work	Result
2014	14th Annual Transmedia Gujarati Stage and Screen Awards	Best Debut Actress	Aa Family Comedy Che	Nominated
2015	15th Annual Transmedia Gujarati Stage and Screen Awards	Best Actress Award	Kumkum Na Pagla Padya	Won
2018	Gujarati Iconic Film Awards (GIFA)	Best Debut Actress	Aavuj Rehshe	Nominated
2023	Gujarati Iconic Film Awards (GIFA)	Best Actress Jury Critics	Hoon Tari Heer	Won
2025	Gujarati Iconic Film Awards (GIFA)	Special Mention Actress of the year	Lagan Special	Won
