= Jaysuk Zdpayo =

2022 Indian Gujarati film

- Directed by: Dharmessh Mehta
- Written by: Amit Aaryan
- Produced by: Dharmessh Mehta
- Starring: Johnny Lever; Jimit Trivedi; Puja Joshi; Anang Desai
- Cinematography: Ashok Salian
- Music by: Kashyap Sompura
- Production company: Namanraj Productions Pvt Ltd
- Release date: 3 June 2022
- Running time: 134 minutes
- Country: India
- Language: Gujarati

Jaysuk Zdpayo is a 2022 Indian Gujarati-language comedy film that revolves around the main character Jaysuk, played by Jimit Trivedi. Jaysuk is burdened by his father's debt and works for Mansukh, played by Johnny Lever. The film is directed and produced by Dharmessh Mehta, known for his work on the popular television show Taarak Mehta Ka Ooltah Chashmah.

== Plot ==
Jaysuk's father has placed him in substantial financial debt. He only has one income, and is struggling to pay off the debt. Jaysuk comes to Ahmedabad and gets a job in a company, and falls in love with his co-worker Jigna. Meanwhile, his boss's sister (Kiran), comes back to India after completing her studies in London and falls in love with Jaysuk. When he learns of this, Jaysuk's boss Mansukh tries to force Jaysuk to marry Kiran, but Jaysuk denies that the two are in love. Jaysuk asks his friends for help, Sushil (Jaysuk's friend) lies to Mansukh, but is not convincing. Mansukh fires Jaysuk, and so Jaysuk must figure out a way to solve his many problems.

== Cast ==
- Jimit Trivedi as Jaysuk
- Johnny Lever as Mansukh
- Puja Joshi as Jigna
- Hardik Sangani as Susheel
- Anang Desai as Pratap Rai
- Sangeeta Khanayat as Kiran
- Monaz Mevawalla as Sweety
- Sanchi Peswani as Kunjbala
- Purvi Vyas as Shobha
- Hemang Dave as Dhilesh Kumar

== Production ==
Jaysuk Zdpayo was directed and produced by Dharmessh Mehta under the banner of Namanraj Productions Pvt Ltd. The script was written by Amit Aaryan, and dialogue was written by Sanjay Chhel.

=== Development ===
The first poster for the film was released on 16th April 2022, followed by the official trailer of the movie on 12 May 2022, published on Dharmessh's official YouTube Channel. The renowned film critic, Taran Adarsh, made the announcement of the trailer on his social media. The trailer launch and music launch event took place in Mumbai on 11 May 2022. The complete soundtrack of the film was also released on 12th May 2022. The music rights were acquired by Zee Music Company, and for marketing and promotion Shemaroo Entertainment and Colors Gujarati have collaborated on the project. The music for the film was composed by Kashyap Sompura. The title track of the film sung by Sukhwinder Singh, the love Aankhone Aaresong by Palak Muchhal and Javed Ali and Naughty Naughty song, were sung by Bhoomi Trivedi. The film was released in cinemas on 3 June 2022.

== Soundtrack ==
Jaysuk Zdpayo

Studio album by Kashyap Sompura, Sukhwinder Singh, Javed Ali, Palak Muchhal, Bhoomi Trivedi
- Released: 12 May 2022
- Genre: Feature film soundtrack
- Label: Zee Music Company

=== Tracklist ===
The soundtrack of the album was composed by Kashyap Sompura with lyrics written by Medha Antani. The soundtrack album consists of three tracks. All three were released by Zee Music Company.

No.	Title	Lyrics	Music	Singer(s)	Length
1.	"Jaysuk Zdpayo Title Track"	Medha Antani	Kashyap Sompura	Sukhwinder Singh	3:23
2.	"Ankho Ni Aare"	Medha Antani	Kashyap Sompura	Javed Ali & Palak Muchhal	4.26
3.	"Naughty Naughty"	Medha Antani	Kashyap Sompura	Bhoomi Trivedi	4.13
