= The Voice (Indian TV series) season 3 =

The Voice
- Season 3
- Hosted by: Divyanka Tripathi Dahiya
- Judges: AR Rahman (Guest); Armaan Malik; Harshdeep Kaur; Kanika Kapoor; Adnan Sami
- Winner: Sumit Saini (बछीङनाथ)
- Winning coach: Harshdeep Kaur
- Runner-up: Adnan Ahmad
- Finals venue: Mumbai

Release
- Original network: StarPlus
- Original release: 3 February – 4 May 2019

Season chronology
- ← Previous; Season 2

The third season of The Voice, the Indian reality talent show, premiered on 3 February 2019 on StarPlus and concluded on 4 May 2019, with Sumit Saini being crowned as the winner.

A new twist called "Block" was featured, which allows a coach to block another coach from getting a contestant.

Like season 2, the Steal button was featured in The Battles but its number was decreased from two to one steal per coach.

== Coaches and hosts ==
Season 3 coaches

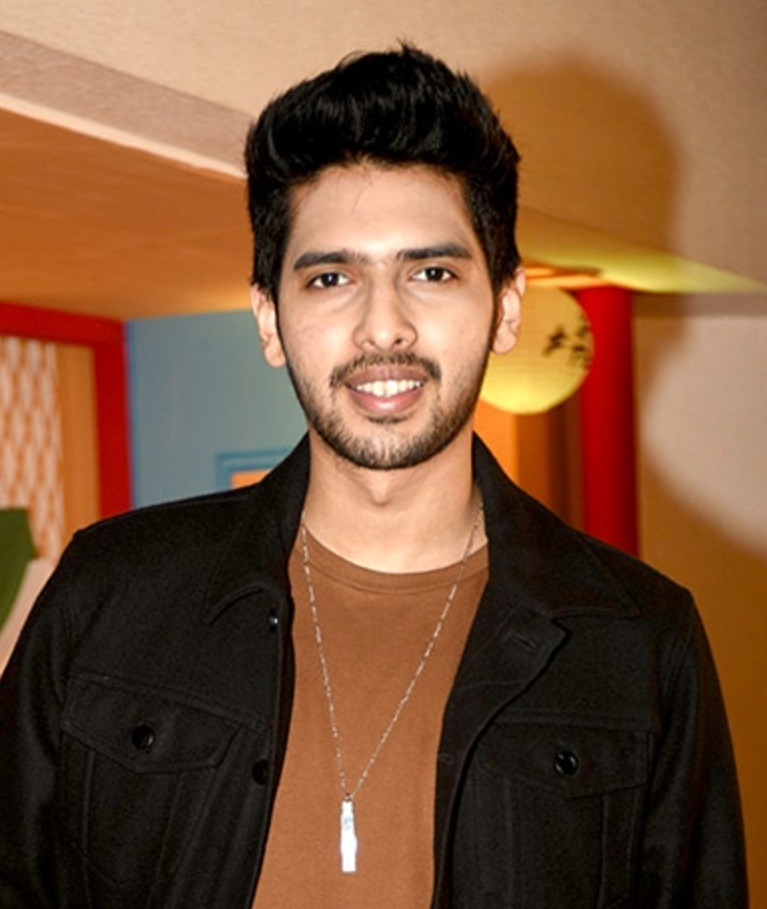
Armaan Malik

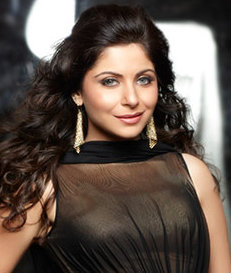
Kanika Kapoor

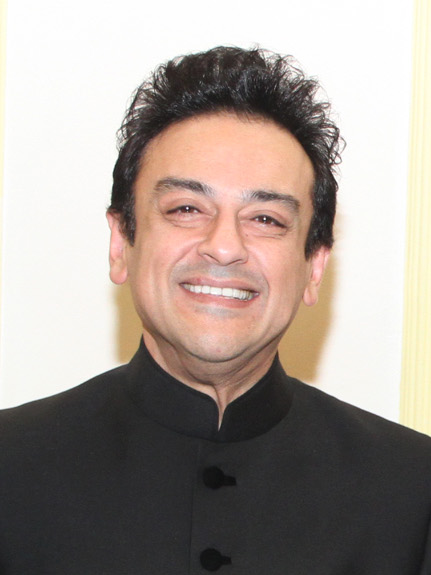
Adnan Sami

In July 2018, the series was renewed for a third season and it was announced that the series is to be shifted from &TV to StarPlus as the channel sell its broadcasting rights to broadcast its onward seasons to StarPlus. In January 2019, Adnan Sami, Armaan Malik, Harshdeep Kaur and Kanika Kapoor were announced as the new mentors, with A. R. Rahman being the super judge, while Divyanka Tripathi Dahiya was announced as the new host.

== Overview ==
Winner

Runner-up

Third place

Fourth place

Each coach was allowed to advance four top to the live shows:

| Team Armaan | Team Harshdeep | Team Kanika | Team Adnan |
| Bandana Dutta | Sumit Saini | Nidhi Kohli | Adnan Ahmad |
| Rajat Hegde | Hargun Kaur | Tanisha Datta | Simran Chaudhary |
| Preetika Bhasin | Anikait | Deepak Rana | Arghyadeep Ghosh |
| Mayur Sukale | Mamta Raut | Kaushik Kar | Deepak Bharti |

== Teams ==
Color key

- Winner
- Runner-up
- Third place
- Fourth place
- Eliminated in the Semifinals
- Eliminated in the Live shows
- Eliminated in the Super Battle rounds
- Stolen in the Battle rounds
- Eliminated in the Battle rounds

| Coach | Top 48 | | | | | |
|---|---|---|---|---|---|---|
| Armaan Malik | | | | | | |
| Armaan Malik | Bandana Dutta | Preetika Bhasin | Rajat Hegde | Mayur Sukale | Tanvir Hussain | Rohan Pathak |
| Armaan Malik | Sudhir Yaduvanshi | ~~Mamta Raut~~ | Prateeksha Srivastava | Mandar Shevde | Nimisha Deb | Paakhi Saikia |
| Armaan Malik | Harshit Singh Baid | | | | | |
| Harshdeep Kaur | | | | | | |
| Harshdeep Kaur | Sumit Saini | Hargun Kaur | Anikait | Mamta Raut | Bhanvari Devi | Simran Bhardwaj |
| Harshdeep Kaur | Shahzad Ali | ~~Sai Shastri Mohan~~ | ~~Deepak Rana~~ | Purusharth Jain | Bhavani Kumar Pandey | Papri Mahajan |
| Harshdeep Kaur | Munawwar Ali | | | | | |
| Kanika Kapoor | | | | | | |
| Kanika Kapoor | Nidhi Kohli | Tanisha Datta | Deepak Rana | Kaushik Kar | Sakhi Hamid Hussain | Hassrat |
| Kanika Kapoor | Pawan Kumar Hans | Jasim Jamal | Mad Skull | Dipsikha Bhuyan | Mukesh Chawaria | Pramod Tripathi |
| Kanika Kapoor | Shraddha Shree | | | | | |
| Adnan Sami | | | | | | |
| Adnan Sami | Adnan Ahmad | Simran Chaudhary | Arghyadeep Ghosh | Deepak Bharti | Sai Shastri Mohan | Suprit Chakraborty |
| Adnan Sami | Lakshya Bhatnagar | ~~Bandana Dutta~~ | Surinder Khan | Jay & Bharat | Varinder Singh | Shubham Pradhan |
| Adnan Sami | Kanishka Negi | | | | | |
Note: Italicized names are stolen artists (names struck through within former teams).

== Blind auditions ==
Colour key

| ✔ | Coach hit the "I WANT YOU" button |
| | Artist defaulted to this team |
| | Artist elected to join this team |
| | Artist eliminated with no coach pressing "I WANT YOU" button |
| | Artist received an 'All Turn'. |
| ✘ | Coach hit the "I WANT YOU" button, but was blocked by Armaan from getting the artist |
| ✘ | Coach hit the "I WANT YOU" button, but was blocked by Harshdeep from getting the artist |
| ✘ | Coach hit the "I WANT YOU" button, but was blocked by Kanika from getting the artist |
| ✘ | Coach hit the "I WANT YOU" button, but was blocked by Adnan from getting the artist |

=== Episode 1 (3 February) ===
| Order | Artist | Song | Coaches and artists choices | | | |
| Order | Artist | Song | Armaan | Harsh | Kanika | Adnan |
|---|---|---|---|---|---|---|
| 1 | Sumit Saini | "Kinna Sohna Tenu Rab Ne Banaya" | — | ✔ | ✔ | ✔ |
| 2 | Adnan Ahmad | "Tu Hi Meri Shab Hai" | ✔ | ✔ | ✔ | ✔ |
| 3 | Bhanvari Devi | "Kattey" | — | ✔ | ✔ | — |
| 4 | Dipsikha Bhuyan | "Humma Humma" | — | ✔ | ✔ | ✔ |
| 5 | Mayur Sukale | "Shree Ganeshay Dheemahi" | ✔ | ✔ | ✔ | ✔ |
| 6 | Shubham Pradhan | "Zindagi Kaisi Hai Paheli" | — | — | — | ✔ |
| 7 | Kaushik Kar | "Shaan Se" | ✔ | ✔ | ✔ | ✔ |

=== Episode 2 (9 February) ===
| Order | Artist | Song | Coaches and artists choices | | | |
| Order | Artist | Song | Armaan | Harshdeep | Kanika | Adnan |
|---|---|---|---|---|---|---|
| 1 | Simran Chaudhary | "Namak Ishq Ka" | ✔ | ✔ | ✔ | ✔ |
| 2 | Deepak Rana | "Upar Khuda" | ✔ | ✔ | ✔ | ✔ |
| 3 | Bandana Dutta | "Dil Mera Muft Ka" | ✔ | ✔ | ✔ | ✔ |
| 4 | Mukesh Chawaria | "Maula Maula" | ✔ | ✔ | ✔ | ✔ |
| 5 | Nidhi Kohli | "Lambi Judai" | — | — | ✔ | ✔ |
| 6 | Rajat Hegde | "Main Kya Karoon" | ✔ | — | — | — |
| 7 | Mamta Raut | "Sajanji Vaari Vaari" | ✔ | ✔ | — | — |
| 8 | Sreejaa Upadhyay | "Dil Hai Chota Sa" | — | — | — | — |

=== Episode 3 (10 February) ===
| Order | Artist | Song | Coaches and artists choices | | | |
| Order | Artist | Song | Armaan | Harshdeep | Kanika | Adnan |
|---|---|---|---|---|---|---|
| 1 | Suprit Chakraborty | "Aaj Ibaadat" | ✔ | ✔ | ✔ | ✔ |
| 2 | Hargun Kaur | "Bulleya" | ✔ | ✔ | ✔ | — |
| 3 | Sakhi Hamid Hussain | "Piya Haji Ali" | — | ✔ | ✔ | ✘ |
| 4 | Preetika Bhasin | "Mayya Mayya" | ✔ | ✔ | ✔ | — |
| 5 | Rushik Thakkar | "Bas Itna Sa Khwab Hai" | — | — | — | — |
| 6 | Hassrat | "Ikk Kudi" | — | — | ✔ | — |
| 7 | Surinder Khan | "Chupke Chupke Raat Din" | — | ✔ | — | ✔ |

=== Episode 4 (16 February) ===
| Order | Artist | Song | Coaches and artists choices | | | |
| Order | Artist | Song | Armaan | Harshdeep | Kanika | Adnan |
|---|---|---|---|---|---|---|
| 1 | Anikait | "Laal Ishq" | — | ✔ | — | — |
| 2 | Nimisha Deb | "Kamli Kamli" | ✔ | — | ✔ | ✔ |
| 3 | Aman Athwal | "Ishq Sufiyana" | — | — | — | — |
| 4 | Tanisha Datta | "Chhil Gaye Naina" | ✔ | — | ✔ | ✔ |
| 5 | Jay & Bharat | "Vashmalle" | ✔ | ✔ | ✔ | ✔ |
| 6 | Simran Bhardwaj | "Dilbaro" | — | ✔ | — | — |
| 7 | Munawwar Ali | "Sun Zara" | ✔ | ✔ | — | — |
| 8 | Harshit Singh Baid | "Sun Le Zara" | ✔ | — | — | — |
| 9 | Shahzad Ali | "Phir Le Aaya Dil" | ✔ | ✔ | — | — |

=== Episode 5 (17 February) ===
| Order | Artist | Song | Coaches and artists choices | | | |
| Order | Artist | Song | Armaan | Harshdeep | Kanika | Adnan |
|---|---|---|---|---|---|---|
| 1 | Kanishka Negi | "Haaye Rama" | — | — | ✔ | ✔ |
| 2 | Pramod Tripathi | "Humka Peeni Hai" | ✔ | ✔ | ✔ | ✔ |
| 3 | Papri Mahajan | "Taare Hai Baarati" | ✔ | ✔ | — | ✔ |
| 4 | Tanvir Hussain | "Bhar Do Jholi" | ✔ | ✔ | ✔ | ✘ |
| 5 | Shraddha Shree | "Bhare Naina" | ✔ | ✔ | ✔ | ✔ |
| 6 | Debasnan Himadribas | "Maa" | — | — | — | — |
| 7 | Jasim Jamal | "Tu Hi Re" | ✔ | — | ✔ | — |
| 8 | Shivika Rajesh | "Gulabi Aankhein" | — | — | — | — |
| 9 | Priyam Srivastava | "Khatouba" | — | — | — | — |

=== Episode 6 (23 February) ===
| Order | Artist | Song | Coaches and artists choices | | | |
| Order | Artist | Song | Armaan | Harshdeep | Kanika | Adnan |
|---|---|---|---|---|---|---|
| 1 | Arghyadeep Ghosh | "Samne Ye Kaun Aaya" | ✔ | — | ✔ | ✔ |
| 2 | Rohan Pathak | "Janam Janam" | ✔ | ✔ | — | — |
| 3 | Debolina Halder | "Jiya Re" | — | — | — | — |
| 4 | Deepak Bharti | "Dil Haara" | ✔ | ✔ | ✔ | ✔ |
| 5 | Sudhir Yaduvanshi | "Omkara" | ✔ | ✔ | ✔ | ✔ |
| 6 | Lakshya Bhatnagar | "Humdum Soniyo" | ✔ | ✔ | ✔ | ✔ |
| 7 | Purusharth Jain | "Ek Ladki Bheegi Bhaagi Si" | — | ✔ | — | — |
| 8 | Prateeksha Srivastava | "Pyar Hua Chupke Se" | ✔ | — | — | — |
| 9 | Mad Skull | "Beat Boxing" | — | — | ✔ | — |

=== Episode 7 (24 February) ===
| Order | Artist | Song | Coaches and artists choices | | | |
| Order | Artist | Song | Armaan | Harshdeep | Kanika | Adnan |
|---|---|---|---|---|---|---|
| 1 | Junetra Das | "Pyar Do Pyar Lo" | — | — | — | — |
| 2 | Mandar Shevde | "O Saiyyan" | ✔ | ✘ | — | ✔ |
| 3 | Paakhi Saikia | "Hungama Ho Gaya" | ✔ | — | — | — |
| 4 | Bhavani Kumar Pandey | "Issaqbaazi" | Team full | ✔ | — | — |
| 5 | Pawan Kumar Hans | "Maula Mere Le Le Meri Jaan" | Team full | ✔ | ✔ | ✔ |
| 6 | Krishnakali Saha | "Aao Huzoor" | Team full | — | Team full | — |
| 7 | Tuhin Kumar Mondal | "Mera Dil Bhi Kitna Pagal Hai" | Team full | — | Team full | — |
| 8 | Sai Shastri Mohan | "Ramta Jogi" | Team full | ✔ | Team full | ✔ |
| 9 | Shubham Bhatt | "Rapper" | Team full | Team full | Team full | — |
| 10 | Akash Sharma | "Kal Ho Naa Ho" | Team full | Team full | Team full | — |
| 11 | Khushi Shubh | "Heer" | Team full | Team full | Team full | — |
| 12 | Raj Shekhar | "Naina" | Team full | Team full | Team full | — |
| 13 | Ananya Ashabary | "Hum Dil De Chuke Sanam" | Team full | Team full | Team full | — |
| 14 | Rabjot Singh | "Dil Diyan Gallan" | Team full | Team full | Team full | — |
| 15 | Varinder Singh | "Challa" | Team full | Team full | Team full | ✔ |

== The Battles ==
The Battle Rounds started on 2 March. The coaches can steal one losing artist from other coaches. Contestants who win their battle or are stolen by another coach will advance to the Super Battle rounds.

Color key:

| Artist won the Battle and advanced to the Super Battle round |
| Artist lost the Battle but was stolen by another coach and advanced to the Super Battle round |
| Artist lost the Battle and was eliminated |

=== Episode 8 (2 March) ===
| Order | Coach | Winner | Song | Loser | 'Steal' result | | | |
| Order | Coach | Winner | Song | Loser | Armaan | Harshdeep | Kanika | Adnan |
|---|---|---|---|---|---|---|---|---|
| 1 | Harshdeep Kaur | Anikait | "Dil Hai Ki Manta Nahi" | Papri Mahajan | — | —N/a | — | — |
| 2 | Armaan Malik | Preetika Bhasin | "Duniya Mein Logon Ko" | Paakhi Saikia | —N/a | — | — | — |
| 3 | Kanika Kapoor | Sakhi Hamid Hussain | "Pardah Hai Pardah" | Mukesh Chawaria | — | — | —N/a | — |
| 4 | Adnan Sami | Arghyadeep Ghosh | "Ye Jawani Hai Deewani" | Shubham Pradhan | — | — | — | —N/a |
| 5 | Harshdeep Kaur | Bhanvari Devi | "Holiya Me Ude Re Gulal" | Bhavani Kumar Pandey | — | —N/a | — | — |
| 6 | Adnan Sami | Deepak Bharti | "Mast Kalandar" | Varinder Singh | — | — | — | —N/a |
| 7 | Harshdeep Kaur | Simran Bhardwaj | "Pehla Nasha" | Purusharth Jain | — | —N/a | — | — |
| 8 | Armaan Malik | Rajat Hegde | "Chala Jata Hoon" | Nimisha Deb | —N/a | — | — | — |

=== Episode 9 (3 March) ===
| Order | Coach | Winner | Song | Loser | 'Steal' result | | | |
| Order | Coach | Winner | Song | Loser | Armaan | Harshdeep | Kanika | Adnan |
|---|---|---|---|---|---|---|---|---|
| 1 | Adnan Sami | Adnan Ahmad | "Khuda Jaane" | Kanishka Negi | — | — | — | —N/a |
| 2 | Adnan Sami | Simran Chaudhary | "Beedi" & "Aaja Nachle" | Bandana Dutta | ✔ | — | — | —N/a |
| 3 | Armaan Malik | Sudhir Yaduvanshi | "Dard-e-Disco" | Harshit Singh Baid | Team full | — | — | — |
| 4 | Harshdeep Kaur | Sumit Saini | "Piya Re" | Deepak Rana | Team full | —N/a | ✔ | — |
| 5 | Kanika Kapoor | Nidhi Kohli | "Leke Pahla Pahla Pyar" & "Kajra Mohabbat Wala" | Shraddha Shree | Team full | — | Team full | — |
| 6 | Armaan Malik | Mayur Sukale | "Mitwa" | Mandar Shevde | Team full | — | Team full | — |
| 7 | Harshdeep Kaur | Shahzad Ali | "Abhi Mujh Mein Kahin" | Munawwar Ali | Team full | —N/a | Team full | — |
| 8 | Kanika Kapoor | Pawan Kumar Hans | "In Dino" | Pramod Tripathi | Team full | — | Team full | — |

=== Episode 10 (9 March) ===
| Order | Coach | Winner | Song | Loser | 'Steal' result | | | |
| Order | Coach | Winner | Song | Loser | Armaan | Harshdeep | Kanika | Adnan |
|---|---|---|---|---|---|---|---|---|
| 1 | Kanika Kapoor | Kaushik Kar | "Yaad Aa Raha Hai" | Dipsikha Bhuyan | Team full | — | Team full | — |
| 2 | Adnan Sami | Lakshya Bhatnagar | "Chand Mera Dil", "Aa Dil Kya Mehfil Hai" & "Tum Kya Jano Mohabbat Kya Hai" | Jay & Bharat | Team full | — | Team full | —N/a |
| 3 | Harshdeep Kaur | Hargun Kaur | "Naina Thag Lenge" | Sai Shastri Mohan | Team full | —N/a | Team full | ✔ |
| 4 | Armaan Malik | Rohan Pathak | "Waada Raha Sanam" | Prateeksha Srivastava | Team full | — | Team full | Team full |
| 5 | Armaan Malik | Tanvir Hussain | "Hai Agar Dushman" | Mamta Raut | Team full | ✔ | Team full | Team full |
| 6 | Adnan Sami | Suprit Chakraborty | "Tum Itna Jo Muskura Rahe Ho" | Surinder Khan | Team full | Team full | Team full | Team full |
| 7 | Kanika Kapoor | Tanisha Datta | "Lat Lag Gayee" & "High Heels" | Mad Skull | Team full | Team full | Team full | Team full |
| 8 | Kanika Kapoor | Hassrat | "O Rangrez" | Jasim Jamal | Team full | Team full | Team full | Team full |

== The Super Battles ==
The Super Battle episode aired on 10 March. The coaches put three/four of their own team members against each other, with only two artists making a place in the top sixteen and the Grand Gala round.

Color key:

| Contestant wins Super Battle round |
| Contestant loses Super Battle round and is eliminated |

=== Episode 11 (10 March) ===
| Order | Coach | Winners | | Losers | |
| Order | Coach | Artists | Song | Artists | Song |
|---|---|---|---|---|---|
| 1 | Harshdeep Kaur | Mamta Raut | "Paan Khaye Saiyan Hamaro" | Bhanvari Devi | "Chadh Chadh Jana" |
| 1 | Harshdeep Kaur | Anikait | "Moh Moh Ke Dhaage" | Bhanvari Devi | "Chadh Chadh Jana" |
| 2 | Adnan Sami | Adnan Ahmad | "Tu Aashiqui Hai" | Lakshya Bhatnagar | "Mehbooba Mehbooba" |
| 2 | Adnan Sami | Simran Chaudhary | "Choli Ke Peeche Kya Hai" | Lakshya Bhatnagar | "Mehbooba Mehbooba" |
| 3 | Kanika Kapoor | Deepak Rana | "Jiya Dhadak Dhadak Jaye" | Sakhi Hamid Hussain | "Khwaja Mere Khwaja" |
| 3 | Kanika Kapoor | Kaushik Kar | "Auva Auva Koi Yahan Nache" | Hassrat | "Tu Jaane Na" |
| 4 | Armaan Malik | Preetika Bhasin | "Jawani Janeman" | Tanvir Hussain | "Mera Piya Ghar Aaya" |
| 4 | Armaan Malik | Rajat Hegde | "Deewana Hua Badal" | Sudhir Yaduvanshi | "Rang De Basanti" |
| 5 | Harshdeep Kaur | Sumit Saini | "Saanu Ik Pal Chain Na Aave" | Simran Bhardwaj | "Lag Jaa Gale" |
| 5 | Harshdeep Kaur | Hargun Kaur | "Mahi Ve" | Shahzad Ali | "Mere Rashke Qamar" |
| 6 | Armaan Malik | Mayur Sukale | "Maurya Maurya" | Rohan Pathak | "Dil Bar Mere" |
| 6 | Armaan Malik | Bandana Dutta | "Ghani Bawri" | Rohan Pathak | "Dil Bar Mere" |
| 7 | Adnan Sami | Deepak Bharti | "Lagan Lagi" | Suprit Chakraborty | "Aaoge Jab Tum" |
| 7 | Adnan Sami | Arghyadeep Ghosh | "Chahe Koi Mujhe Junglee Kahe" | Sai Shastri Mohan | "Lagi Tumse Mann Ki Lagan" |
| 8 | Kanika Kapoor | Tanisha Datta | "Khoya Khoya Chand" | Pawan Kumar Hans | "Dagabaaz Re" |
| 8 | Kanika Kapoor | Nidhi Kohli | "Saiyan Dil Mein Aana Re" | Pawan Kumar Hans | "Dagabaaz Re" |

== The Grand Gala ==
The Grand Gala started on 16 March. In this round, contestants sing individually and there is no elimination.

=== Episode 12 (16 March) ===
| Order | Coach | Artist | Song |
|---|---|---|---|
| 1 | Harshdeep Kaur | Anikait | "Sandese Aate Hain" |
| 2 | Armaan Malik | Preetika Bhasin | "Jane Jaan O Meri Jane Jaan" |
| 3 | Kanika Kapoor | Kaushik Kar | "Hari Om Hari" |
| 4 | Harshdeep Kaur | Sumit Saini | "Jag Ghoomeya" |
| 5 | Adnan Sami | Arghyadeep Ghosh | "Bachna Ae Haseeno" |
| 6 | Kanika Kapoor | Deepak Rana | "Ab Tumhare Hawale Watan" |
| 7 | Armaan Malik | Bandana Dutta | "Dholi Taro Dhol Baaje" |
| 8 | Armaan Malik | Rajat Hegde | "Yeh Sham Mastani" |

=== Episode 13 (17 March) ===
| Order | Coach | Artist | Song |
|---|---|---|---|
| 1 | Kanika Kapoor | Tanisha Datta | "Pyar Mein Dil Pe Maar De Goli" |
| 2 | Adnan Sami | Simran Chaudhary | "Kate Nahin Kat Te" |
| 3 | Adnan Sami | Deepak Bharti | "Chak De India" |
| 4 | Kanika Kapoor | Nidhi Kohli | "Babuji Dheere Chalna" |
| 5 | Adnan Sami | Adnan Ahmad | "Mere Rang Mein Rangne Wali & Pehla Pehla Pyar" |
| 6 | Harshdeep Kaur | Mamta Raut | "Jhumka Gira Re" |
| 7 | Harshdeep Kaur | Hargun Kaur | "Ek Haseena Thi" |
| 8 | Armaan Malik | Mayur Sukale | "Ae Zindagi Gale Laga Le" |

== The Live Shows ==
The Live Shows started on 23 March.

Color key:

| Artist was saved by the Public's votes |
| Artist was saved by his/her coach or was placed in the bottom four |
| Artist was eliminated |

=== Episode 14 (23 March) ===
| Order | Coach | Artist | Song | Result |
|---|---|---|---|---|
| 1 | Armaan Malik | Preetika Bhasin | "Zara Sa Jhoom Loon Main" | Saved |
| 2 | Harshdeep Kaur | Mamta Raut | "Chudiyan Khanak Gayeen" | Eliminated |
| 3 | Harshdeep Kaur | Anikait | "Pal Pal Dil Ke Paas" | Bottom four |
| 4 | Harshdeep Kaur | Sumit Saini | "O Re Piya" | Saved |
| 5 | Armaan Malik | Mayur Sukale | "Yad Lagla & Pehli Baar" | Eliminated |
| 6 | Harshdeep Kaur | Hargun Kaur | "Zindagi Mein Koi Kabhi Aaye Na Rabba" | Saved |
| 7 | Armaan Malik | Rajat Hegde | "Aaj Kal Tere Mere Pyar Ke Charche" | Bottom four |
| 8 | Armaan Malik | Bandana Dutta | "Bhor Bhaye Panghat Pe" | Saved |

=== Episode 15 (24 March) ===
| Order | Coach | Artist | Song | Result |
|---|---|---|---|---|
| 1 | Adnan Sami | Simran Chaudhary | "Tum Dil Ki Dhadkan Mein" | Saved |
| 2 | Kanika Kapoor | Kaushik Kar | "Darling" | Eliminated |
| 3 | Adnan Sami | Arghyadeep Ghosh | "Zindagi Ek Safar Hai Suhana" | Saved |
| 4 | Adnan Sami | Adnan Ahmad | "Chand Sifarish" | Bottom four |
| 5 | Kanika Kapoor | Deepak Rana | "Dulhe Ka Sehra" | Saved |
| 6 | Kanika Kapoor | Nidhi Kohli | "Akhiyon Se Goli Maare" | Saved |
| 7 | Adnan Sami | Deepak Bharti | "Ruth Aa Gayee Re" | Eliminated |
| 8 | Kanika Kapoor | Tanisha Datta | "Om Shanti Om" | Bottom four |

=== Episode 16 (30 March) ===
| Order | Coach | Artist | Song | Result |
|---|---|---|---|---|
| 1 | Harshdeep Kaur | Sumit Saini | "Kahan Raja Bhoj Kahan Gangu Teli" | Saved |
| 2 | Adnan Sami | Arghyadeep Ghosh | "Hum The Woh Thi & Badtameez Dil" | Saved |
| 3 | Armaan Malik | Rajat Hegde | "Paanch Rupaiya Baara Aana" | Public's votes |
| 4 | Adnan Sami | Adnan Ahmad | "Lift Kara De & Kabhi Naee" | Public's votes |
| 5 | Armaan Malik | Preetika Bhasin | "Daiya Yeh Main Kahaa Aa Phasi" | Bottom four |
| 6 | Kanika Kapoor | Deepak Rana | "Switty Tera Pyaar Chaida" | Bottom four |

=== Episode 17 (31 March) ===
| Order | Coach | Artist | Song | Result |
|---|---|---|---|---|
| 1 | Kanika Kapoor | Tanisha Datta | "Sar Jo Tera Chakraye" | Public's votes |
| 2 | Adnan Sami | Simran Chaudhary | "The Breakup Song" | Bottom four |
| 3 | Harshdeep Kaur | Anikait | "Tu Mere Agal Bagal Hai" | Eliminated |
| 4 | Armaan Malik | Bandana Dutta | "Hum Kaale Hai To Kya Hua" | Saved |
| 5 | Harshdeep Kaur | Hargun Kaur | "Aake Seedhi Lage Dil Pe Jaise" | Bottom four |
| 6 | Kanika Kapoor | Nidhi Kohli | "Aage Peeche" | Saved |

=== Episode 18 (6 April) ===
| Order | Coach | Artist | Song | Result |
|---|---|---|---|---|
| 1 | Harshdeep Kaur | Sumit Saini | "Woh Kisna Hai" | Saved |
| 2 | Adnan Sami | Arghyadeep Ghosh | "Ae Ajnabi" | Saved |
| 3 | Armaan Malik | Bandana Dutta | "Parde Mein Rehne Do" | Saved |
| 4 | Adnan Sami | Simran Chaudhary | "Chamma Chamma & Resham Ka Rumaal" | Public's votes |
| 5 | Armaan Malik | Rajat Hegde | "Kabhi Jo Baadal Barse" | Saved |

=== Episode 19 (7 April) ===
| Order | Coach | Artist | Song | Result |
|---|---|---|---|---|
| 1 | Kanika Kapoor | Nidhi Kohli | "Mehboob Mere" | Saved |
| 2 | Armaan Malik | Preetika Bhasin | "Tu Tu Hai Wahi" | Public's votes |
| 3 | Kanika Kapoor | Tanisha Datta | "Main Albeli" | Saved |
| 4 | Harshdeep Kaur | Hargun Kaur | "Kabira" | Public's votes |
| 5 | Adnan Sami | Adnan Ahmad | "Yeh Jo Mohabbat Hai" | Saved |
| 6 | Kanika Kapoor | Deepak Rana | "Tere Naam" | Eliminated |

=== Episode 25 - Semifinal (28 April) ===
Color key:

| Artist was saved by the Public's votes and placed as first, second, third or fourth finalist |
| Artist was eliminated and placed as top five or six |

| Coach | Artist | Song | Result |
|---|---|---|---|
| Harshdeep Kaur | Sumit Saini | | First finalist |
| Harshdeep Kaur | Hargun Kaur | | Second finalist |
| Adnan Sami | Simran Choudhary | | Third finalist |
| Adnan Sami | Adnan Ahmad | | Fourth finalist |
| Armaan Malik | Preetika Bhasin | | Top five |
| Adnan Sami | Arghyadeep Ghosh | | Top six |
| Armaan Malik | Bandana Dutta | | Eliminated |
| Kanika Kapoor | Nidhi Kohli | | Eliminated |
| Kanika Kapoor | Tanisha Datta | | Eliminated |

=== Episode 26 - Final (4 May) ===
Result details

- Winner
- Runner-up
- Third place
- Fourth Place

| Order | Coach | Artist | Song | Result |
|---|---|---|---|---|
| 1 | Harshdeep Kaur | Sumit Saini | "Aahun Aahun" | Winner |
| 2 | Harshdeep Kaur | Hargun Kaur | "Mere Naam Tu" | Fourth place |
| 3 | Adnan Sami | Simran Chaudhary | "Sheila Ki Jawani" | Third place |
| 4 | Adnan Sami | Adnan Ahmad | "Hawayein" | Runner-up |
