= The Voice (Indian TV series) season 1 =

The Voice
- Season 1
- Hosted by: Karan Tacker; Meet Jain (backstage)
- Judges: Himesh Reshammiya; Mika Singh; Shaan; Sunidhi Chauhan
- Winner: Pawandeep Rajan
- Winning coach: Shaan
- Runner-up: Deepesh Rahi

Release
- Original network: &TV
- Original release: 6 June – 30 August 2015

Season chronology
- Next → Season 2

The first season of The Voice, the Indian reality talent show, premiered on 6 June 2015 and concluded on 30 August 2015, with Pawandeep Rajan being crowned as the winner.

== Coaches and hosts ==
In April 2015, &TV and show producer Endemol India announced leading Bollywood singers Himesh Reshammiya, Mika Singh, Shaan and Sunidhi Chauhan as the coaches for the first season and Karan Tacker as the host. Endemol India announced that Terence Lewis would be choreographing the opening act for the premiere of the show.

Sunidhi Chauhan during the premiere of the show on 6 June 2015, flaunted a dress worth ₹0.3 million (US$3,100). The dress was especially created for her by internationally acclaimed Indian fashion designers Falguni and Shane Peacock. Chauhan wore the dress for a two minute-performance. Chauhan in a statement said, "Everything about the evening was just so grand - right from the spectacular production, the choreography, and my look."

== Season overview ==
Key

Winner

Runner-up

Third place

Fourth place

Each coach was allowed to advance seven top to the live shows:

Team Himesh	Team Shaan	Team Sunidhi	Team Mika
Deepesh Rahi	Pawandeep Rajan	Rishabh Chaturvedi	Parampara Thakur
Sachet Tandon	Snigdhajit Bhowmik	Vishva Shah	Sahil Solanki
Piyush Ambhore	Akash Ojha	Parth Doshi	Tanvir Singh
Sanjana Bhola	Ritu Agarwal	Shristi Bhandari	Passang Doma
Anish Matthew	Varsha Krishnan	Oishwaryaa Chattui	Jyotica Tangri
Sakshi Chauhan	Arpita Khan	Pragya Patra	Harjot Kaur
Mona Bhatt	Sana Aziz	Gopal Dass	Akshay Ghanekar

== Teams ==
Color key

- Winner
- Runner-up
- Third place
- Fourth place
- Eliminated in Live shows
- Eliminated in Battle rounds

Coach	Artists						
Himesh Reshammiya							
Himesh Reshammiya	Deepesh Rahi	Sachet Tandon	Piyush Ambhore	Sanjana Bhola	Anish Matthew	Sakshi Chauhan	Mona Bhatt
Himesh Reshammiya	Kushal Chokshi	Nalini Krishnan	Sayan Chaudhary	Rohan Pathak	Jaysinh Gadhavi	Varsha Singh	Shuchi Arora
Shaan							
Shaan	Pawandeep Rajan	Snigdhajit Bhowmik	Akash Ojha	Ritu Agarwal	Varsha Krishnan	Arpita Khan	Sana Aziz
Shaan	Amrapali	Saurav Sharma	Sai Bisoi	Meet Jain	Aishwarya Anand	Mohit Pathak	Deepmala Halder
Sunidhi Chauhan							
Sunidhi Chauhan	Rishabh Chaturvedi	Vishwa Shah	Parth Doshi	Shristi Bhandari	Oishwaryaa Chattui	Pragya Patra	Gopal Dass
Sunidhi Chauhan	Sargam	Anshuman Paul	Premnath Kotwal	Garima Khiste	Shrinidhi Ghatate	Atit Kumar Pandey	Niyam Kanungo
Mika Singh							
Mika Singh	Parampara Thakur	Sahil Solanki	Tanvir Singh	Passang Doma Lama	Jyotica Tangri	Harjot Kaur Arora	Akshay Ghanekar
Mika Singh	Tanu Srivastava	Manisha Chakraborty	Abhik Ghosh	Deepa Vishwakarma	Dushyant Rupolia	Deepak Malik	Vinti Singh

== The Blind Auditions ==
Key	Coach hit his or her "I WANT YOU" button	Contestant eliminated with no coach pressing his/her "I WANT YOU" button	Contestant defaulted to this coach's team	Contestant elected to join this coach's team

=== Week 1 ===
==== Episode 1: 6 June 2015 ====
Order	Contestant	Song	Coaches' and Contestants' Choices			
Order	Contestant	Song	Himesh Reshammiya	Shaan	Sunidhi Chauhan	Mika Singh
1	Sargam	"Tere Bina"		—		
2	Sahil Solanki	"Tashan Main"	—			
3	Kushal Chokshi	"Mere Naina"			—	
4	Shaheen Khan	"Lambi Judaai"	—	—	—	—
5	Amrapali	"Aage Bhi Jaane Na Tu"	—			
6	Rishabh Chatruvedi	"Saanwre"				

==== Episode 2: 7 June 2015 ====
Order	Contestant	Song	Coaches' and Contestants' Choices			
Order	Contestant	Song	Himesh Reshammiya	Shaan	Sunidhi Chauhan	Mika Singh
1	Sanjana Bhola	Chaap Tilak - Folk song		—		
2	Anshuman Paul	"Sajda"	—			—
3	Piyush Ambhore	"Khalbhali"		—	—	—
4	Shristi Bhandari	"Jiya Lage Naa"				
5	Varsha Krishnan	Saathi Re Bhool Na Jaana Mera Pyar	—		—	
6	Kabul Bukhari	"Haal E Dil"	—	—	—	—
7	Tanu Srivastava	"Aan Milo Sajana"	—	—		

=== Week 2 ===
==== Episode 3: 13 June 2015 ====
Order	Contestant	Song	Coaches' and Contestants' Choices			
Order	Contestant	Song	Himesh Reshammiya	Shaan	Sunidhi Chauhan	Mika Singh
1	Nalini Krishnan	"Jallah Wallah"			—	
2	Sayan Chaudhary	"Har Kisi Ko Nahin Milta"		—	—	—
3	Tanvir Singh	"Sawan Main Lag Gayi Aag"	—		—	
4	Manisha Chakraborty	"Darling"	—		—	
5	Ritu Agarwal	"Main Kahan Phassi"	—		—	
6	Atul Kumar Dwivedi	"Saanson Ki Zaroorat" & "Dard Karara"	—	—	—	—
7	Parth Doshi	"Kaun Mera"				

==== Episode 4: 14 June 2015 ====
Order	Contestant	Song	Coaches' and Contestants' Choices			
Order	Contestant	Song	Himesh Reshammiya	Shaan	Sunidhi Chauhan	Mika Singh
1	Parampara Thakur	"Jhoom Jhoom Jhoom Baba"	—		—	
2	Rohan Pathak	"Dil Haara Re"		—	—	—
3	Pawandeep Rajan	"Ye Tune Kya Kiya"	—		—	
4	Premnath Kotwal	"Mast Magan"	—	—		—
5	Jyotica Tangri	"Jugni"				
6	Sam Chandel	"Itni Si Hassi"	—	—	—	—
7	Sakshi Chauhan	"Phir Le Aaya Dil"				

=== Week 3 ===
==== Episode 5: 20 June 2015 ====
Order	Contestant	Song	Coaches' and Contestants' Choices			
Order	Contestant	Song	Himesh Reshammiya	Shaan	Sunidhi Chauhan	Mika Singh
1	Snigdhajit Bhowmik	"Dhan Te Nan"				
2	Garima Khiste	"Ek Tara"	—	—		—
3	Saurav Sharma	"Kyun Kisi Ko"	—		—	—
4	Akash Ojha	"Bang Bang"	—		—	—
5	Aamir Khan	"Ab Jaoon Kahan"	—	—	—	—
6	Shrinidhi Ghatate	"Raat Akeli Hain"				
7	Sanjeet Thomas	"Kesariya Balam"	—	—	—	—
8	Anish Matthew	"Sakoon Mila"		—	—	

==== Episode 6: 21 June 2015 ====
Order	Contestant	Song	Coaches' and Contestants' Choices			
Order	Contestant	Song	Himesh Reshammiya	Shaan	Sunidhi Chauhan	Mika Singh
1	Abhik Ghosh	"Mujhe Raat Din"	—	—	—	
2	Jaysinh Gadhavi	"Ishq Sufiana"		—	—	—
3	Mona Bhatt	"Sun Raha Hai"			—	
4	Sai Bisoi	"Lagan Lagi"	—		—	
5	Shyam Ghediya	"Aaoge Jab Tum"	—	—	—	—
6	Meet Jain	"O Re Piya"				
7	Oishwaryaa Chatui	"Kahe Ched Mohe"	—	—		—

=== Week 4 ===
==== Episode 7: 27 June 2015 ====
Order	Contestant	Song	Coaches' and Contestants' Choices			
Order	Contestant	Song	Himesh Reshammiya	Shaan	Sunidhi Chauhan	Mika Singh
1	Passang Doma Lama	Gana Nayakaya - Bhajan song		—	—	
2	Vishva Shah	"Tu Hi Re"	—			
3	Deepak Gupta	"Chand Sifarish"	—	—	—	—
4	Bharti Gupta	"Aa Zara"	—	—	—	—
5	Varsha Singh	"Kamli"		—	—	—
6	Arpita Khan	"Niyaat Kharab Hai"				
7	Deepa Vishwakarma	"Tum Hi Ho"	—	—	—	

==== Episode 8: 28 June 2015 ====
Order	Contestant	Song	Coaches' and Contestants' Choices			
Order	Contestant	Song	Himesh Reshammiya	Shaan	Sunidhi Chauhan	Mika Singh
1	Harjot Kaur Arora	Jo Bheji Thi Dua	—			
2	Dushyant Rupolia	"Mitwa"	—		—	
3	Mou Chatterjee	"Piya Bavari"	—	—	—	—
4	Aishwarya Anand	"Dil Mera Muft Ka"	—		—	—
5	Shuchi Arora	"Challa"		—	—	
6	Atit Kumar Pandey	"Sajde"				
7	Akshay Ghanekar	"Muskurane ki Wajah"		—	—	

=== Week 5 ===
==== Episode 9: 4 July 2015 ====
Order	Contestant	Song	Coaches' and Contestants' Choices			
Order	Contestant	Song	Himesh Reshammiya	Shaan	Sunidhi Chauhan	Mika Singh
1	Deepak Malik	Allah Waariyan			—	
2	Mohit Pathak	"Aye Khuda"	—		—	—
3	Joanne Fernandes	"Khoya Khoya Chand"	—	—	—	—
4	Sanchet Tandon	"Kabira"				
5	Deepmala Halder	"Bahara"	—		—	—
6	Niyam Kanungo	"Khamoshiyaan"	—	—		

==== Episode 10: 5 July 2015 ====
Order	Contestant	Song	Coaches' and Contestants' Choices			
Order	Contestant	Song	Himesh Reshammiya	Shaan	Sunidhi Chauhan	Mika Singh
1	Pragya Patra	"Samjhawan"	—	—		
2	Deepesh Rahi	"Hum Jo Chalne Lage"				
3	Chandra Subramanium	"Haal Kaisa Hai Janab Ka"	—	—	—	—
4	Gopal Dass	"Teri Jhuki Nazar"	—	—		
5	Sana Aziz	NA	—		—	
6	Vinti Singh	Moh Moh Ke Dhaage - Female	—	—	—	

== The Battle Rounds ==
=== Week 6 ===
==== Episode 11: 11 July 2015 ====
Key
Battle Winner
Eliminated Artist

Coach	Artists		Song
Shaan	Snighdajit	Meet	"Sree Ganesha Deva"
Sunidhi Chauhan	Srishti	Sargam	"Swing"
Mika Singh	Passam	Tanu	"Bayan Na Dharo O Balma"
Himesh Reshammiya	Sachet	Sayan	"Jeena Jeena"

==== Episode 12: 12 July 2015 ====
Coach	Artists		Song
Shaan	Pawandeep Rajan	Sai Shastri	"Aaj Din Chadiya"
Himesh Reshammiya	Mona Bhatt	Shuchi Arora	"Soniye Je Tere Naal"
Sunidhi Chauhan	Rishabh Chaturvedi	Atit Kumar Pandey	"Haule Haule"
Mika Singh	Harjot Kaur Arora	Vinti Singh	"Hungama Ho Gaya"
Shaan	Arpita Khan	Saurav Sharma	"Woh Hai Zara Khafa Khafa"

=== Week 7 ===
==== Episode 13: 18 July 2015 ====
Coach	Artists		Song
Mika Singh	Jyotica Tangri	Deepa Vishwakarma	"Duniya Main Logon Ko"
Sunidhi Chauhan	Pragya Patra	Garima Khiste	"Mohe Pangat Pe"
Himesh Reshammiya	Piyush Ambhore	Kushal Chokshi	"Tu Hi Meri Shab Hai"
Shaan	Sana Aziz	Amrapali	"Humma"
Sunidhi Chauhan	Gopal Dass	Premnath Kotwal	"Tere Naina"

==== Episode 14: 19 July 2015 ====
Coach	Artists		Song
Himesh Reshammiya	Sanjana Bhola	Varsha Singh	"Ram Chahe Leela"
Mika Singh	Sahil Solanki	Dushyant Rupolia	"Titli Dabochli"
Sunidhi Chauhan	Vishwa Shah	Anshuman Paul	"Arziyan"
Mika Singh	Akshay Ghanekar	Abhik Ghosh	"Jab Se Tere Naina"
Shaan	Ritu Agarwal	Aishwarya Anand	"Kyun"

=== Week 8 ===
==== Episode 15: 25 July 2015 ====
Coach	Artists		Song
Sunidhi Chauhan	Parth Doshi	Niyam Kannungo	"Wallah Re Wallah"
Himesh Reshammiya	Anish Matthew	Rohan Pathak	"O Hum Dum Suniyo Re"
Mika Singh	Parampara Thakur	Manisha Chakraborty	"Pataka Guddi"
Shaan	Varsha Krishnan	Deepmala Halder	"Bhare Naina"
Himesh Reshammiya	Sakshi Chauhan	Nalini Krishnan	"Malang"

==== Episode 16: 26 July 2015 ====
Coach	Artists		Song
Mika Singh	Tanvir Singh	Deepak Malik	"Humko Peeni Hai"
Himesh Reshammiya	Deepesh Rahi	Jaysinh Gadhavi	"Bichdann"
Sunidhi Chauhan	Oishwarya Chatui	Shrinidhi Ghatate	"Pyar Ki Ye Ek Kahani Suno"
Shaan	Akash Ojha	Mohit Pathak	"Surili Ankhiyon Wale"

== The Live Shows ==
=== Week 9 ===
==== Episode 17: 1 August 2015 ====
– Contestant saved by the public vote
– Contestant saved by coach
– Contestant eliminated

Order	Coach	Contestant	Song	Result
1	Mika Singh	Tanvir Singh	"Tarki Chokro"	Advanced
2	Mika Singh	Jyotica Tangri	"Chittiyaan Kalaiyaan"	Saved
3	Mika Singh	Sahil Solanki	"London Thumakda"	Saved
4	Mika Singh	Akshay Ghanekar	"Bin Tere"	Eliminated
5	Mika Singh	Parampara Thakur	"Paani Da"	Saved
6	Mika Singh	Passang Doma Lama	"Ajeeb Dastaan Hai Ye"	Advanced
7	Mika Singh	Harjot Kaur Arora	"Pareshaan"	Eliminated
8	Himesh Reshammiya	Mona Bhatt	"Albela Sajan Aiyoni"	Eliminated
9	Himesh Reshammiya	Sanjana Bhola	"Jugni Ji"	Saved
10	Himesh Reshammiya	Piyush Ambhore	"Raabta"	Saved
11	Himesh Reshammiya	Anish Matthew	"Ilahi"	Saved
12	Himesh Reshammiya	Sakshi Chauhan	"Main Jahan Rahoon"	Eliminated
13	Himesh Reshammiya	Sachet Tandon	"Milne Hai Mujhse Aayi"	Advanced
14	Himesh Reshammiya	Deepesh Rahi	"Dagabaaz Re"	Advanced

==== Episode 18: 2 August 2015 ====
Order	Coach	Contestant	Song	Result
1	Sunidhi Chauhan	Rishabh Chaturvedi	"Bachna Ae Haseeno"	Saved
2	Sunidhi Chauhan	Oishwarya Chatui	"Mohabbat Buri Bimari"	Saved
3	Sunidhi Chauhan	Shristi Bhandari	"Halla Machchaye Re"	Advanced
4	Sunidhi Chauhan	Pragya Patra	"Baby Doll"	Eliminated
5	Sunidhi Chauhan	Vishwa Shah	"Saree Ka Fall Sa"	Advanced
6	Sunidhi Chauhan	Gopal Dass	"Pehli Baar"	Eliminated
7	Sunidhi Chauhan	Parth Doshi	"Tune Maari Entriyaan"	Saved
8	Shaan	Arpita Khan	"O Meri Jaan"	Eliminated
9	Shaan	Pawandeep Rajan	"Phir Se Udd"	Saved
10	Shaan	Snigdhajit Bhowmik	"Jhoom Barabaar"	Saved
11	Shaan	Varsha Krishnan	"Banarasiya"	Saved
12	Shaan	Akash Ojha	"Locha E Ulfat"	Advanced
13	Shaan	Sana Aziz	"Noor E Khuda"	Eliminated
14	Shaan	Ritu Agarwal	"Rang Lagade"	Advanced

=== Week 10 ===
==== Episode 19: 8 August 2015 ====
Order	Coach	Contestant	Song	Result
1	Shaan	Snigdhajit Bhowmik	"Jabse Mere Dil Ko Uff"	Saved
2	Mika Singh	Sahil Solanki	"Hud Hud Dabangg"	Saved
3	Shaan	Varsha Krishnan	"Tere Naina"	Eliminated
4	Shaan	Akash Ojha	Title tack of Kill Dil	Advanced
5	Shaan	Pawandeep Rajan	"Ye Laal Ishq"	Saved
6	Mika Singh	Parampara Thakur	"Munni Badnaam Hui"	Saved
7	Mika Singh	Tanvir Singh	"Rabba Main Toh Mar Gaya"	Advanced
8	Mika Singh	Jyotica Tangri	"Joganiya"	Eliminated
9	Shaan	Ritu Agarwal	"Jiya Re"	Advanced
10	Mika Singh	Passang Doma Lama	"Tere Mast Mast Do Nain"	Advanced

==== Episode 20: 9 August 2015 ====
Order	Coach	Contestant	Song	Result
1	Himesh Reshammiya	Piyush Ambhore	"Sadda Haq"	Saved
2	Himesh Reshammiya	Sanjana Bhola	"Mann Ki Lagan"	Saved
3	Sunidhi Chauhan	Rishabh Chaturvedi	"Pichle Saath Dino Main"	Saved
4	Himesh Reshammiya	Sachet Tandon	"Tera Naam Japdi Firan"	Advanced
5	Sunidhi Chauhan	Parth Doshi	"Ishaaqzade"	Saved
6	Himesh Reshammiya	Deepesh Rahi	"Ainvayi Ainvayi"	Advanced
7	Sunidhi Chauhan	Shristi Bhandari	"Ambarsariya"	Advanced
8	Sunidhi Chauhan	Vishwa Shah	"Maahi Ve"	Advanced
9	Sunidhi Chauhan	Oishwarya Chatui	"Balam Pichkari"	Eliminated
10	Himesh Reshammiya	Anish Matthew	"Kabhi Jo Baadal Barse"	Eliminated

=== Week 11 ===
==== Episode 21: 15 August 2015 ====
Order	Coach	Contestant	Song	Result
1	Shaan	Pawandeep Rajan	"Maula Mere Lele Meri Jaan"	Saved
2	Himesh Reshammiya	Sachet Tandon	"Rubaroo"	Saved
3	Himesh Reshammiya	Sanjana Bhola	"Zor Ka Jhatka"	Eliminated
4	Himesh Reshammiya	Piyush Ambhore	"Chunar"	Saved
5	Himesh Reshammiya	Deepesh Rahi	"‘Jee Karda"	Advanced
6	Shaan	Ritu Agarwal	"Beedi Jalaeile"	Eliminated
7	Shaan	Snigdhajit Bhowmik	"Ab Tumhare Hawaale Watan Saathiyo"	Advanced
8	Shaan	Akash Ojha	"Teri Meri Kahani"	Saved

==== Episode 22: 16 August 2015 ====
Order	Coach	Contestant	Song	Result
1	Sunidhi Chauhan	Rishabh Chaturvedi	?	Saved
2	Mika Singh	Tanvir Singh	"Mast Kalandar"	Advanced
3	Mika Singh	Parampara Thakur	"Ye Tumhari Meri Baatein"	Saved
4	Sunidhi Chauhan	Vishwa Shah	"Shayarana"	Advanced
5	Mika Singh	Sahil Solanki	"Awara"	Saved
6	Sunidhi Chauhan	Parth Doshi	"Tadap Tadap Ke"	Saved
7	Sunidhi Chauhan	Shristi Bhandari	"Main Tumko Nahin Chodungi"	Eliminated
8	Mika Singh	Passang Doma Lama	"Chalo Tumko Lekar Chale"	Eliminated

=== Week 12 ===
==== Episode 23: 22 August 2015 ====
Order	Coach	Contestant	Song	Result
1	Mika Singh	Sahil Solanki	"Aahun Aahun"	Saved
2	Shaan	Pawandeep Rajan	"Tujhe Bhula Diya"	Saved
3	Shaan	Akash Ojha	"Meri Adhuri Kahani"	Eliminated
4	Mika Singh	Parampara Thakur	"Koi Yahan Naache Naache"	Advanced
5	Shaan	Snigdhajit Bhowmik	"Slow Motion Angreza"	Advanced
6	Mika Singh	Tanvir Singh	"Laung Da Lashkara"	Eliminated

==== Episode 24: 23 August 2015 ====
Order	Coach	Contestant	Song	Result
1	Sunidhi Chauhan	Rishabh Chaturvedi	"Aaja Aaja Main Hoon Pyar Tera"	Saved
2	Himesh Reshammiya	Sachet Tandon	"Pehla Nasha"	Advanced
3	Himesh Reshammiya	Piyush Ambhore	"Ek Haseena Thi"	Eliminated
4	Himesh Reshammiya	Deepesh Rahi	"Mast Kalandar"	Saved
5	Sunidhi Chauhan	Parth Doshi	?	Eliminated
6	Sunidhi Chauhan	Vishwa Shah	"Kun Faya Kun"	Advanced

== Live Semi-Final and Finale ==
=== Week 13 ===
==== Episode 25: 29 August 2015 ====
The coaches were not allowed to save anyone anymore now-onwards.

Order	Coach	Contestant	Song	Result
1	Mika Singh	Parampara Thakur	"Mera Naam Chin Chin Chu" & "Badtameez Dil"	Advanced
2	Mika Singh	Sahil Solanki	"Jalwa" & "Marjaani"	Eliminated
3	Shaan	Snigdhajit Bhowmik	"Gallan Goodiyan"	Eliminated
4	Shaan	Pawandeep Rajan	"Jai Ho"	Advanced
5	Sunidhi Chauhan	Vishwa Shah	"Saiyaan"	Eliminated
6	Sunidhi Chauhan	Rishabh Chaturvedi	NA	Advanced
7	Himesh Reshammiya	Deepesh Rahi	"Piya Re"	Advanced
8	Himesh Reshammiya	Sachet Tandon	"Tera Hero Idhar Hai"	Eliminated

==== Episode 26: 30 August 2015 ====
The last episode was started an hour before and aired for 2 hours.

Key
Winner
Runner-up
Third place
Fourth place

Competition performances

Artist	Coach	Order	Song	Result
Pawandeep Rajan	Shaan	1	"Selfie Le Le Re"	Winner
Parampara Thakur	Mika Singh	2	Title song from Dil Dhadakne Do	Third place
Rishabh Chaturvedi	Sunidhi Chauhan	3	"Sooraj Dooba Hai"	Fourth place
Deepesh Rahi	Himesh Reshammiya	4	"Mauja Hi Mauja"	Runner-up
