= The Voice (Indian TV series) season 2 =

The Voice
- Season 2
- Hosted by: Gunjan Utreja; Sugandha Mishra
- Judges: Salim Merchant; Neeti Mohan; Benny Dayal; Shaan
- Winner: Farhan Sabir
- Winning coach: Shaan
- Runner-up: Rasika Borkar
- Finals venue: Urban Brew Studios, Johannesburg

Release
- Original network: &TV
- Original release: 10 December 2016 – 12 March 2017

Season chronology
- ← Previous; Season 1 Next → Season 3

The second season of The Voice, the Indian reality talent show, premiered on 10 December 2016 and concluded on 12 March 2017, with Farhan Sabir being crowned as the winner. The reality series is produced by Urban Brew Studios for &TV.

== Coaches and hosts ==
Shaan was announced as returning coach; Neeti Mohan, Salim Merchant and Benny Dayal joined Shaan. Karan Tacker was replaced by Gunjan Utreja as the host of the season. Sugandha Mishra joined Utreja as the co-host.

== Series overview ==
Winner

Runner-up

Third place

Fourth place

Each coach was allowed to advance three top to the live shows:

Team Salim	Team Neeti	Team Benny	Team Shaan
Paras Maan	Niyam Kanungo	Rasika Borkar	Farhan Sabir
Yashodhan Rao	Neha Bhanushali	Sona Vakil	Parakhjeet Singh
Sharayu Date	Mohd. Danish	Divyansh Verma	Neha Khankriyal

== Teams ==
Color key

- Winner
- Runner-up
- Third place
- Fourth place
- Eliminated

Coach	Top 49						
Salim Merchant							
Salim Merchant	Parakhjeet Singh	Paras Maan	Yashodhan Rao Kadam	Archit Patadia	Rachit Agarwal	Sharayu Date	Oshin Bhatia
Salim Merchant	Yogandha Vashishth	Purnima Tripathi	Smita Shradha Das	Sona Vakil	Madhur Dhir		
Neeti Mohan							
Neeti Mohan	Niyam Kanungo	Mohd. Danish	Sameer Hussain	Neha Bhanushali	Shruti Ravichandran	Kuldeep Pattanayak	Shwetha Devanahally
Neeti Mohan	Harsha Ranjini	Vivek Prasad	Jahanvi Sangha	Nirvesh Dave	Aditi Khandegal		
Benny Dayal							
Benny Dayal	Rasika Borkar	Krunal Thakur	Shilpa Surroch	Veda Nerurkar	Paras Jetly	Krutika Borkar	Divyansh Verma
Benny Dayal	Baishali Lama	Abhishek Mukherjee	Molyshree Garg	Kamaldeep Kaur	Jaskaran Singh		
Shaan							
Shaan	Farhan Sabir	Neha Khankriyal	Meghana Bhat	Suchandra Mondal	Isha Singh	Abhimanyu Ganguly	Sumit Bhardwaj
Shaan	Deepa Dhami	Rithika Vadaddi	Arfin Rana	Aviinash Singh Parihar	Sneha Kumari	Pratik Raj	

== Episode 28: 12 March 2017 (Grand Finale) ==
Key
Winner
Runner-up
Third place
Fourth place

Competition performances

Artist	Coach	Order	Song	Result
Parakhjeet Singh	Shaan	1	"Gal Bang Gayi" & "Kala Chashma"	Third place
Niyam Kanungo	Neeti Mohan	2	"Alvida"	Fourth place
Farhan Sabir	Shaan	3	"Jugni"	Winner
Rasika Borkar	Benny Dayal	4	"Parda Hai Parda" and "Hungama Ho Gaya"	Runner-up
