= Meet Jain =

Indian singer

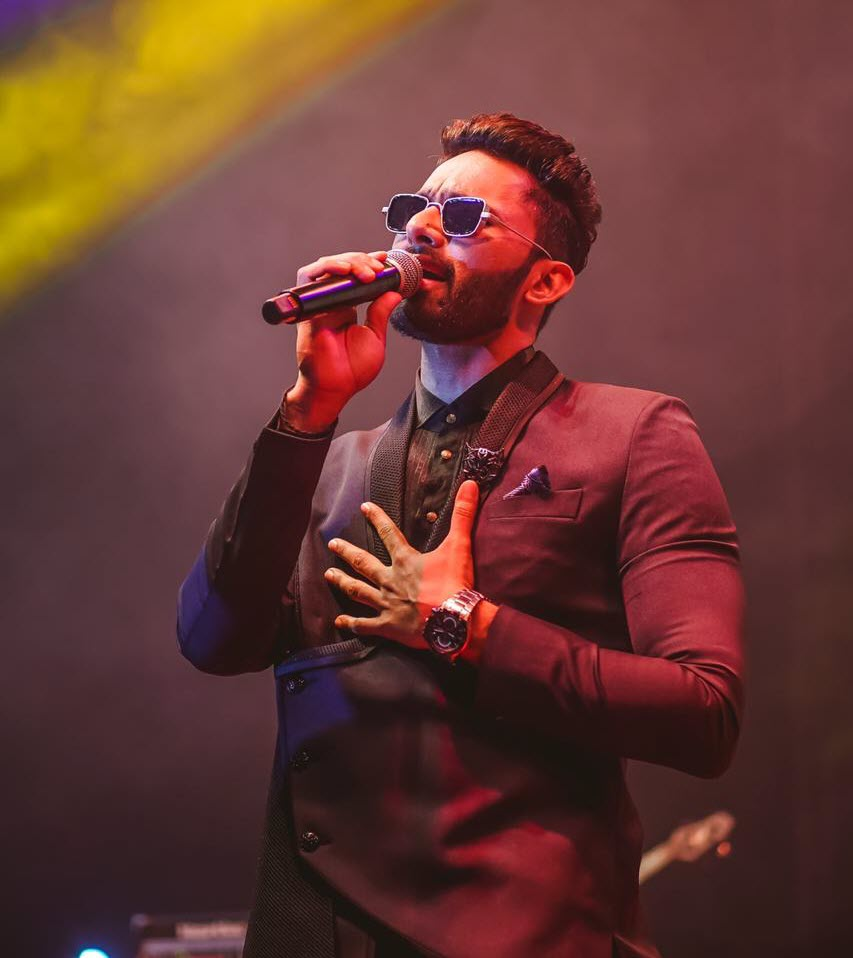
- Jain in 2019
- Education: Sardar Patel University
- Occupations: Singer, composer, lyricist
- Years active: 2013–present
- Website: meetjain.co.in

Meet Jain is an Indian playback singer, composer, and lyricist in the Hindi and Gujarati film industry who became a part of the first season of the Indian reality singing show The Voice in 2015, mentored by singer Shaan.

== Personal life ==
Jain was born and brought up in Ahmedabad, Gujarat in a family of professors. He went to Aroma High School and holds a master's degree in Industrial Biotechnology, from Sardar Patel University in Vallabh Vidyanagar. He is a well-trained vocalist, pianist, and guitarist. He has done stage performances since the age of 12.

== Music career ==
Jain sings for both the Gujarati and Hindi industry. His career took off when in 2013 he was the winner of Idea Rocks India, Ahmedabad, where he shared the stage with Mika Singh.

He has sung for big business banner advertisements of TATA and ADANI in Gujarati language.

Jain was a contestant in the 5th edition of Sony TV Entertainment Ke Liye Kuch Bhi Karega, judged by Farah Khan and Anu Malik. In 2015 his band made it to the reality show MTV Never Hide Sound with Rahul Ram (Indian Ocean Band) as their mentor.

In June 2015, he participated in the first season of The Voice. He was chosen to be a part of Shaan's team and was eliminated during the battle rounds. Due to his popularity in the show, he hosted The Voice India as well, with Karan Tacker.

He played his friend, the actor and host Arjun Bijlani, on a special episode of Dance Deewane 2. There, he sang for Bijlani and shared the stage with Madhuri Dixit, Tushar Kalia, and Shashank Khaitan.

He has performed in more than 1100 shows worldwide and has given his voice to several Gujarati songs. His most popular one is "Radha Khovai", in which he featured alongside Shraddha Dangar.

He has also composed several Gujarati songs such as "Radha Khovai", "Nach Mari Saathe" (title song) and "E Memo".

In 2019, Jain spoke at a TEDx event held at Great Lakes Institute of Management, Chennai.

He has done playback singing for more than 25 Gujarati albums and movies including Ghar Ek Mandir, Kalyug No Kanho, Armaan, Superstar, Bau Na Vichar, and Ambe Maat Ni.

== Albums / singles ==
S. no	Year	Album(s)/single(s)	Song	Singer(s)/co-singer(s)	Lyrics	Music	Length
1	2019	Radha Khovaai	Radha Khovaai	Meet Jain	Bhargav Purohit	Arpan Mahida	3:27
2	2016	Armaan	Nazariya	Meet Jain	D - Kay	Samir Mana	4:54
3	2019	Bau na vichar	Bau na vichar title	Meet Jain, Kirtidan Gadhvi, Jigardan Gadhavi, Siddharth Amit Bhavsar, Aishwarya Majmudar, Parth Oza & Aditya Gadhavi	Hrutul, Hardik Jagani	Hrutul	2:27
4	2017	Superstar	Aayo Maro Superstar	Arvind Vegda & Meet Jain (Rap)	Niren Bhatt	Parth Bharat Thakkar	3:03
5	2018	Nach Mari Sathe	Nach Mari Sathe	Meet Jain	Bhargav Purohit	Kunal Shah	0:30
6	2015	Prem Ji	Prem Ji Title	Balraj Shahtri, Meet Jain, Rutvij Pandya & Vrattini Ghadge	Bhargav Purohit	Kedar- Bhargav	2:29
7	2015	Red Raas - 6	Bhavnao Ko Samjho	Meet Jain	Bhargav Purohit	Kedar & Bhargav	3:14
8	2015	Red Raas - 6		Vratini & Meet Jain	RJ Devaki	Kedar & Bhargav	3:17
9	2019	Red Raas season 9	Let's Havmore	Meet Jain & Dimple Biscuitwala	Bhargav Purohit	Kedar & Bhargav	4:57
10	2019	Red Raas season 10	Helmetdhari no garbo	Meet Jain	Tushar Shukla	Kedar & Bhargav	3:48
11	2019	Red Raas season 10	E Memo	Meet Jain	Bhavesh Bhatt	Arpan Mahida	3:50
