= Armaan Malik =

Indian playback singer (born 1995)

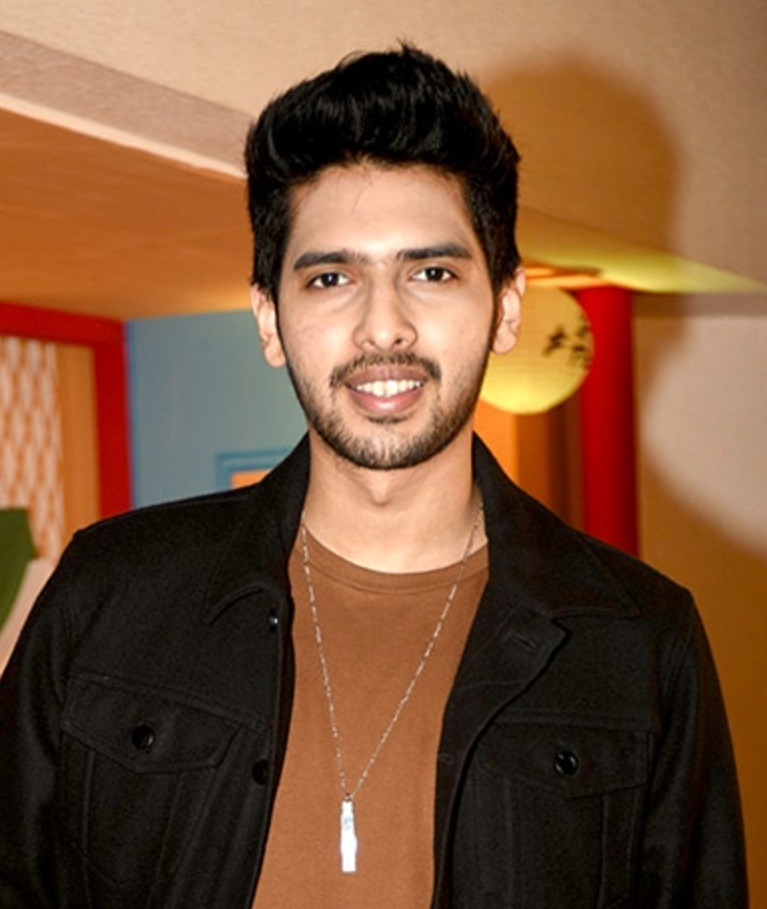
- Armaan Malik in 2016
- Born: Mumbai, Maharashtra, India
- Occupations: Playback Singer; Songwriter; Voice-over
- Spouse: Aashna Shroff (m. 2024)
- Parent(s): Daboo Malik, Jyoti Malik
- Musical career
- Genres: Filmi; Indian classical music; Indian pop
- Instrument: Vocals; Guitar
- Years active: 2007–present
- Label: Always Music Global
- Website: http://armaanmalik.com/

Armaan Malik is an Indian playback singer, songwriter, voice actor, and actor. He started his career in 2007 as a child vocalist in Bollywood, making his debut with the song "Bum Bum Bole" from the film Taare Zameen Par. Malik made his first on-screen appearance in the film Kaccha Limboo in 2011. He has been associated with Universal Music India and T-Series.

== Early life ==
He has an older brother, Amaal Malik, who is also a musician. Malik attended Jamnabai Narsee School in Mumbai, India.

== Career ==
=== Career beginnings (2006–2010) ===
Armaan Malik began his career in 2006 after appearing in the TV Singing Competition, Sa Re Ga Ma Pa L’il Champs, where he finished eighth. Under the musical directions of the musical trio Shankar-Ehsaan-Loy, he made his debut as a child singer in 2007 with the song Bum Bum Bole from the film Taare Zameen Par. In 2010, he provided the voice for an English boy in My Name Is Khan and voiced the character Salim in the radio adaptation of Slumdog Millionaire for BBC Radio 1.

=== Playback singing and first album (2014–2019) ===
In 2014, Malik made his playback singing debut with "Tumko Toh Aana Hi Tha" in Jai Ho. He also contributed to the film’s title track and "Love You Till the End", appearing along side his brother Amaal Malik, who composed the music.

In the same year, he sang the song "Naina" for the drama film Khoobsurat, and he also sang the song "Auliya" for the film Ungli, and released his debut album Armaan.

In 2015, he recorded songs for films including Hero, Calendar Girls, and Hate Story 3. His work that year included "Tumhe Apna Banane Ka" and "Wajah Tum Ho". He also released the single "Main Rahoon Ya Na Rahoon" and sang "Yaar Indha Muyalkutti". That year, he received the Filmfare R. D. Burman Award for New Music Talent.

Between 2016 and 2018, Malik recorded songs for films including Sanam Re, Kapoor & Sons, Azhar, Do Lafzon Ki Kahani, and Baaghi, the latter featuring the duet Sab Tera with Shraddha Kapoor. He collaborated with artists such as Shreya Ghoshal and Jeet Gannguli, and sang his first Bengali song, Dhitang Dhitang, for Love Express. He was the lead singer for the soundtrack of M.S. Dhoni: The Untold Story. He also sang Sau Asmaan with Neeti Mohan for Baar Baar Dekho and Ishaara for Force 2.

He sang "Tum Jo Mille" for Saansein, "Pal Pal Dil Ke Paas (Reprise)", and "Dil Mein Chupa Lunga (Remake)" for Wajah Tum Ho. He released the single "Pyaar Manga Hain", a remake of the original with Neeti Mohan and performed the title track of the Star Paarivar Awards 2016 with Palak Muchhal and Meet Bros.

In 2019, Malik sang Jab Se Mera Dil for Amavas, Dil Me Ho Tum for Why Cheat India, and Kyun Rabba for Badla. He also sang Chale Aana for De De Pyaar De. That year, he voiced the lead character in the Hindi dubbed version of Disney’s live action film Aladdin.

=== Continued work (2020–present) ===
Malik has signed with Arista Records on 12 March 2020 and released his first English language single, Control, on 20 March 2020. The song won the Best Indian Act award at the 2020 MTV Europe Music Awards.

In 2020, Malik became the first Indian artist to reach number one on the Triller Global Billboard charts twice. He later released his second English single, "How Many".

In 2021, he recorded songs for films including Darbar, Gunjan Saxena: The Kargil Girl, Khuda Haafiz, Saina, Koi Jaane Na, 99 Songs, Bell Bottom, Thalaivii, Bhoot Police, and Velle.

He was featured on the A. R. Rahman single Meri Pukaar Suno, released in June 2021, alongside K.S. Chithra, Sadhana Sargam, Shreya Ghoshal, Asees Kaur, Shashaa Tirupati, and Alka Yagnik. In September 2021, Malik collaborated with Daboo Malik, Amaal Mallik, and Kunaal Vermaa on the single Barsaat.

In 2022, Malik released the English single "You", which earned him the Best India Act award a second time at the MTV Europe Music Awards. He also provided vocals for the films Bhool Bhulaiyaa 2, Major, and Ardh, released the Hindi singles "Nakhrey Nakhrey" and "Rehna Tere Paas", and collaborated on a remix of Ed Sheeran’s song "2step".

== Personal life ==
On 28 August 2023, Malik announced his engagement to Aashna Shroff. The couple got married on 28 December 2024 in Mahabaleshwar.

== Television ==
| Year | Show | Episode | Role |
|---|---|---|---|
| 2006 | Sa Re Ga Ma Pa L'il Champs | - | Contestant |
| 2012 | The Suite Life of Karan & Kabir | Season 1, episode 22 | Zafir Ali |
| 2015 | Indian Idol Junior 2 | - | Guest |
| 2016 | The Kapil Sharma Show | Season 1, episode 15 | Guest |
| 2016 | Sa Re Ga Ma Pa | - | Guest |
| 2017 | The Drama Company | Episode 23 | Guest |
| 2019 | No. 1 Yaari Jam | Episode 2 | Guest |
| 2019 | The Voice | Season 3 | Judge |
| 2019 | By Invite Only | Episode 42 | Guest |
| 2019 | The Kapil Sharma Show | Season 2, episode 56 | Guest |
| 2020 | Jammin' | Season 3 | Guest |
| 2020 | The Love Laugh Live Show | Season 2 | Guest |
| 2021 | Unacademy Unwind with MTV | - | Guest |

== Awards and nominations ==
Armaan Malik awards and nominations
Awards and nominations
| Award | Wins | Nominations |

Totals (Note: Certain award groups do not simply award one winner. They acknowledge several different recipients, have runners-up, and have third place. Since this is a specific recognition and is different from losing an award, runner-up mentions are considered wins in this award tally. For simplification and to avoid errors, each award in this list has been presumed to have had a prior nomination.)
- Wins: 19
- Nominations: 23

| Year | Award | Song/Album | Category | Result |
|---|---|---|---|---|
| 2015 | Mirchi Music Awards | "Naina" – Khoobsurat | Upcoming Male Vocalist of The Year | Nominated |
| 2015 | Mirchi Music Awards | "Bas Is Pal Mein" | Indie Pop Song of the Year | Nominated |
| 2015 | Global Indian Music Academy Awards | Auliya – Ungli | Best Debutant Award – Film | Won |
| 2015 | Global Indian Music Academy Awards | Armaan – Album | Jagjit Singh Award – Best Music Debut | Won |
| 2015 | Big Star Entertainment | Tumhe Apna Banane Ka – Hate Story 3 | Most Entertaining Singer – Male | Won |
| 2015 | Stardust Awards | Main Hoon Hero Tera – Hero | Best Playback Singer – Male | Won |
| 2016 | Filmfare R. D. Burman Award | New Music Talent | RD Burman Award | Won |
| 2016 | Global Indian Music Academy Awards | Main Rahoon Ya Na Rahoon | Best Music Video | Won |
| 2016 | Mirchi Music Awards | "Main Rahoon Ya Na Rahoon" | Indie Pop Song of the Year | Won |
| 2017 | South Indian International Movie Awards | "Sariyagi Nenapide" – Mungaru Male 2 | Best Male Playback Singer Kannada | Won |
| 2017 | 15th Santosham Film Awards | "Emo Emo" - Katamarayudu | Best Male Playback Singer | Won |
| 2018 | Filmfare Awards South | "Ondu Malebillu" – Chakravarthy | Best Male Playback Singer – Kannada | Won |
| 2018 | Filmfare Awards South | "Hello" – Hello | Best Male Playback Singer – Telugu | Nominated |
| 2018 | Filmfare Award South | "Ninnila Ninnila" – Tholi Prema | Best Male Playback Singer – Telugu | Nominated |
| 2020 | Mirchi Music Awards | "Pehla Pyaar" | Listener's Choice - Album of the Year | Won |
| 2020 | MTV Europe Music Awards | "Control" | Best Indian Act | Won |
| 2021 | Mirchi Music Awards | Not Mentioned | Smule's Most Jammed Artist | Won |
| 2021 | Mirchi Music Awards South | "Butta Bomma" | Viral Song Of The Decade (Telugu) | Won |
| 2021 | South Indian International Movie Awards | Ninna Raja Naanu | Best Playback Singer (Male) (Kannada) | Nominated |
| 2021 | South Indian International Movie Awards | "Butta Bomma" | Best Playback Singer (Male) (Telugu) | Won |
| 2021 | Cinegoers Association Awards | "Butta Bomma" | Best Playback Singer (Male) (Telugu) | Won |
| 2021 | Lokmat Most Stylish Awards | Special Award | Lokmat Most Stylish Singer Award (Male) | Won |
| 2022 | Indian Television Academy Awards | Mujhe Pyaar Pyaar Hai | Best Singer | Won |
| 2022 | Indian Independent Music Awards | Control | Best Pop Song (Consumer Category) | Won |
| 2022 | Beautiful Indians | Special Award | The Voice Of A Generation | Won |
| 2022 | Star Maa Parivaar Award | Special Award | Iconic Singer Of The Decade | Won |
| 2022 | South Indian International Movie Awards | Neenade Naa | Best Playback Singer (Male) | Won |
| 2022 | The Clef Music Award | Nakhrey Nakhrey | Best Artist (Pop) | Won |
| 2022 | MTV Europe Music Awards | You | Best Indian Act | Won |

== Discography ==
Studio Albums

- Armaan (2014)
- MTV Unplugged Season 7 (2018)
- Only Just Begun (2023)

== Filmography ==
- The Suite Life of Karan & Kabir (2012) as Zafar Ali
- Kaccha Limboo (2011) as Armaan
- Aladdin (2019) as Aladdin (voice)
- A Minecraft Movie (2025) as Henry (voice in Hindi)
