= Kamthaan =

2024 Indian Gujarati comedy film

- Official Poster
- Directed by: Dhrunad Kamle
- Written by: Dhrunad Kamle, Abhishek Shah, Jaswant Parmar; Biren Kothari, Urvish Kothari (additional screenplay)
- Based on: Kamthaan by Ashwini Bhatt
- Produced by: Abhishek Shah, Prateek Gupta, Mit Jani, Aayush Patel, Pinal Patel, Amit Patel
- Starring: Hitu Kanodia; Sanjay Goradia; Arvind Vaidya; Darshan Jariwala
- Cinematography: Ankit Trivedi
- Edited by: Prateek Gupta
- Music by: Mehul Surti
- Production companies: Harfanmaula Films, Pam Studio
- Distributed by: Rupam Entertainment Pvt Ltd
- Release date: 2 February 2024
- Running time: 124 minute
- Country: India
- Language: Gujarati

Kamthaan (lit. 'Chaos') is an Indian Gujarati crime comedy film directed by Dhrunad Kamle and produced by Abhishek Shah and others. It is written by Kamle, Shah and Jaswant Parmar with additional screenplay by Biren Kothari and Urvish Kothari. It stars Hitu Kanodia, Sanjay Goradia, Arvind Vaidya, Darshan Jariwala in lead roles as well as a large number of actors in supporting roles. It was released on 2 February 2024.

== Plot summary ==
In 2000, Anjanipur, a thief does a robbery in a house of recently promoted police officer. The thief and his head tries to hide the stolen item while the police which tries to recover the item and arrest them. The chase results in a chaos.

== Cast ==
The film features large ensemble of cast of around 50 actors.

The lead cast include:

- Hitu Kanodia as Police Inspector Satrunjaysinh R. Rathod
- Darshan Jariwala as Head Constable Prabhusinh
- Sanjay Goradia as Raghabhai Dahyabhai, thief
- Arvind Vaidya as Chhanalal Koyo, leader of the thief community
- Deep Viadya as Tribhuvan Pandya, a Police Constable
- Krunal Pandit as Jayanti Jagrut, a journalist of Sinh Garjana
- Tejal Panchasara as Champa Champaneri, a social activist
- Shilpa Thaker as Panni Foi, a bootlegger

Supporting cast include:

- Kamlesh Parmar
- Jassi Gadhvi as mother of Panna Foi
- Kamal Parmar as a tea seller
- Hemin Trivedi as Kenio, a banana seller
- Jay Vithlani as Dr. M. D. Desai, a doctor
- Kiran Joshi as Bhogilal Patel, a police officer
- Tushar Dave as MLA Makuji, a politician
- Pankaj Soni as Pappu
- Pralay Raval as Uko Chitabhai
- Mehul Barot as Dhulo
- Prashant Makwana as Dhamo Ricksawwalo
- Ansu Joshi as Gala Bechar, a thief community member

== Production ==
The film was adapted from a novella by Gujarati writer Ashwini Bhatt published in 2001. It is directed by debut director Dhrunad Kamle and produced by Abhishek Shah who previously produced Hellaro (2019). The screenplay was written by Dhrunad, Abhishek Shah and Jaswant Parmar. The film is based in Charotar region of Gujarat and depicts its culture, clothing and dialect. It was shot in Vaso near Nadiad. The film is based in the time period when the novella was written.

== Soundtrack ==
Mehul Surti said that he researched small-town music as it was 23 years ago when the novella was written. He used local "band baaja" instruments and Indian banjo in songs and background music. "Parsang" is played during an engagement scene in the film while two other songs are used as background score. Actor Maulik Nayak debuted as a playback singer.

Kamthaan

Soundtrack album by Mehul Surti
- Released: 2024
- Genre: Feature film soundtrack
- Language: Gujarati

All music is composed by Mehul Surti.

Track listing
No.	Title	Lyrics	Singer(s)	Length
1.	"Kamthaan (Title Song)"	Abhishek Shah	Maulik Nayak	1:33
2.	"The Chor Song"	Saumya Joshi	Aditya Gadhvi	2:51
3.	"Parsang"	Abhishek Shah	Ghanshyam Zula, Hetal Mody	5:36

== Marketing and release ==
The film title was announced on 6 November 2023. On 18 December 2023, the first poster of the film was released. The teaser was released on 4 January 2024. The trailer was released on 19 January 2024. The film was released on 2 February 2024.

== Reception ==
Kanksha Vasavada writing for The Times of India rated it 4 out of 5. She praised the direction, script, music, screenplay and performances. Nirali Kalani of Mid-Day Gujarati rated it 4 out of 5. She praised the performances of lead as well as supporting cast, direction, cinematography, soundtrack and dialogues but criticised the slow first half. She also noted it as a political and social satire.
