= List of Gujarati films of 2015 =

This is a list of Gujarati language films that were released in 2015. After the slowdown in previous years, Gujarati films earned total est. ₹55 crore (US$6.5 million) in 2015. The Gujarati films collectively grossed ₹46 crore (US$5.4 million) in 2015, according to Ormax Box Office Report.

== Box-office collection ==
Rank	Film	Director	Studio(s)	Gross	Source
1	Chhello Divas	Krishnadev Yagnik	Belvedere Films	est. ₹18 crore (US$2.1 million)	
2	Gujjubhai the Great	Ishaan Randeria	Nakshatra Entertainment, Siddharth Randeria Productions	est. ₹15 crore (US$1.8 million)	

== Releases ==
=== January – March ===
Opening	Name	Genre	Director	Cast	Source
9 January	Aa Te Kevi Dunniya	Comedy	Tejas Padia	Raj Jatania, Yatin Parmar, Kinjal Pandya, Rajkumar Kanojia	
13 February	Sachi Preet Karnara Duniyathi Darta Nathi	Romance action	Haresh Patel	Umesh Barot, Trishla Shaha	
27 February	Chaki Kahe Chaka Jo Baka	Romantic comedy	Utpal Modi	Preyshi Nayak, Nishith Brahmbhatt, Khyati Madhoo, Mukesh Rai	
27 February	Canvas: Rang Jindagi Na	Drama	Vijay K Patel	Chirag Modi, Pooja Nayak, Umang Acharya, Chini Musadiya	
6 March	Thakor No. 1	Drama	Bhagwan Vaghela	Jagdish Thakor, Prinal Oberoi, Marjina Diwan	
13 March	Dikri Ne Na Desho Koi Pardesh	Drama	Subhash J. Shah	Kiran Kumar, Hiten Kumar, Ishwar Thakor, Pinal Oberoi	
20 March	Agni Pariksha	Drama	Nilesh Indu, Maruti Mohite	Prinal Oberoi, Krupa Shah, Ravi Sharma, Jagdish Thakor	

=== April – June ===
Opening	Name	Genre	Director	Cast	Source
3 April	Hu Pujaran Sajan Tara Premni	Drama	Mahesh Raval	Ishwar Smikar, Chandan Rathod, Jannat Chauhan, Nishant Pandya, Riya Panchal	
15 May	Kaydo	Drama	Atul Makwana	Kiran Kumar, Naresh Kanodia, Hitu Kanodia, Mina Kanwar	
22 May	Sajan Tara Vina Suni Jindagi	Drama action romance	Manoj Dobariya	Kiran Acharya, Marjina Diwan, Shrikant Soni, Jeet Upendra	
27 May	Radha Chudlo Perje Mara Naam No	Drama-Romance	Ranjeet Herma	Vikram Thakor, Mamta Soni, and Abhay Harpal	

=== July – September ===
Opening	Name	Genre	Director	Cast	Source
3 July	Saibo Maro Saat Janam No	Action	Ramesh Solanki	Jayant Kadiwar, Guddu Rana, Jetsi Muliyasiya, Kiran Acharya	
10 July	Premji: Rise of a Warrior	Drama	Vijaygiri Bava	Abhimanyu Singh, Happy Bhavsar, Mehul Solanki, Aarohi Patel	
10 July	Dikro Maro Vahal No Varasdar	Drama, Romance	Vasant Narkar	Jeet Upendra, Chini Raval, Mehul Bhuj, Mitesh Darji, Priya Dhariya, Jitu Pandya	
17 August	Bewafa Sajan	Drama	Bhagwan Vaghela	Mamata Soni, Jagdish Thakor	
21 August	Mavtar Pehla Male Mane Maut	Drama	Firoz Khan	Ishwar Thakur, Tina Patel and Dinkar Upadhyay	
28 August	Desh Ni Koi Sarahad Prem Ne Roki Shakti Nathi	Drama	Govindbhai Patel	Vikram Thakor, Tanushri, Hina Rajput, Ratan Rangwani, Chandan Rathod	
18 September	Gujjubhai the Great	Comedy	Ishaan Randeria	Siddharth Randeria, Swati Shah, Dipna Patel, Jimit Trivedi	
18 September	Taro Sur Mara Geet: Ek Sangeetmay Prem Katha	Drama	Manish Chaudhari	Kiran Acharya, Naresh Kanodia, Hiten Kumar, Jitu Pandya	
24 September	Amdavad Ma Famous	Documentary	Hardik Mehta	Zaid	
25 September	Bas Ek Chance	Drama	Kirtan Patel	Parth Oza, Raunaq Kamdar, Shital Shah, Shaina Shah	

=== October – December ===
Opening	Name	Genre	Director	Cast	Source
2 October	The Lady Dabang	Action	Vasant Narkar	Altaf, Hemangini, Firoz Irani, Hemangini Kach	
9 October	Night Out	Drama	Aamir Jasdanwala	Meet Sudani, Siddhi Jain, Aamir Jasdanwala, Jayati Doshi	
12 November	Avtar Dharine Aavu Chu	Drama	Atmaram Thakor	Vikram Thakor, Komal Thacker, Prashant Barot, Pooja Soni	
20 November	Chhello Divas	Comedy	Krishnadev Yagnik	Malhar Thakar, Mitra Gadhvi, Jay Reddy, Yash Soni, Janki Bodiwala	

== See also ==
- List of Gujarati films
- List of highest-grossing Gujarati films
