= Gunaah =

Gunaah (lit. 'sin') may refer to:

- Gunaah (1993 film), an Indian Hindi-language film directed by Mahesh Bhatt
- Gunaah (2002 film), an Indian Hindi-language thriller directed by Amol Shetge
- Gunaah (TV series), an Indian television series directed by Anil Senior

== See also ==
- Gunah (disambiguation)
