= Have Thase Baap Re =

2019 Gujarati family drama film

- Official Poster
- Directed by: Nirav Barot
- Written by: Nirav Barot
- Produced by: Jignesh Patel
- Starring: Kiran Kumar; Raunaq Kamdar; Kumkum Das; Creena Shah; Mamta Chaudhari; Sunil Vishrani; Shekhar Shukla; Haresh Dagia; Vaibhavi Bhatt; Jai Krishan Rathod; Anshu Joshi; Rajoo Barot; Sonali Nanavati; Kiran Joshi; Umang Acharya; Raj Dudhwala; Manin Trivedi
- Production companies: Amdavaad Pictures & Ancora Films LLP in association with DFM Production
- Release date: 18 January 2019
- Running time: 130 minutes
- Country: India
- Language: Gujarati

Have Thase Baap Re is a Gujarati family drama featuring Kiran Kumar and Raunaq Kamdar, Creena Shah, Mamta Chaudhari, Kumkum Das in the lead roles and Shekhar Shukla, Sunil Vishrani, Haresh Dagia, Vaibhavi Bhatt, Jai Krishan Rathod, Anshu Joshi, Rajoo Barot, Sonal Nanavati, Kiran Joshi, Umang Acharya, Raj Dhudhwala, and Manin Trivedi in supporting roles. The film is directed by Nirav Barot and its come back after Thai Jashe and produced by Jignesh Patel from Amdavaad Pictures and co produced by Raj Patel from Ancora Films LLP. The film was released by Rupam Entertainment Pvt Ltd on 18 January 2019.

== Cast ==
- Kiran Kumar as KK
- Kumkum Das as Kaveri
- Raunaq Kamdar as Aadarsh
- Creena Shah as Aarti
- Mamta Chaudhari as Apoorva
- Shekhar Shukla as Khimji Surati
- Haresh Dagia as Chimanbhai
- Vaibhavi Bhatt as Premilaben
- Jai Krishan Rathod as Bipinbhai
- Anshu Joshi as Laljibhai
- Rajoo Barot as Javaharbhai
- Sonal Nanavati as Kailashben
- Kiran Joshi as Karimbhai
- Umang Acharya as Aayan
- Raj Dudhwala as Ritesh
- Manin Trivedi as Ishan

== Production ==
=== Development ===
The film was shot in Ahmedabad and Mount Abu under the production of Amdavaad Pictures and Anocra Films LLP in association with DFM Production .

=== Casting ===
The theatre artist and Bollywood actor Kiran Kumar was hired for the role of father. The role of money minded son is played by Raunaq Kamdar.

== Release ==
The trailer of the film was released on 24 December 2018.

The film was released on 18 January 2019 in India.
