= Family Circus (2018 film) =

- Official Poster
- Directed by: Viral Rao
- Written by: Girish Parmar
- Produced by: Viral Rao; Alpesh Patel; Digesh Patel
- Starring: Raunaq Kamdar; Monal Gajjar; Mitra Gadhavi; Smit Pandya; Bharat Chawda; Mehul Buch
- Cinematography: Shreedhar Bhatt; Suraj C Kurade
- Edited by: Sanjay Sankla
- Music by: Hemang Dholakia
- Production company: Eva Entertainment LLP
- Distributed by: Rupan Entertainment
- Release date: 18 October 2018
- Running time: 138 minutes
- Country: India
- Language: Gujarati

Family Circus is a 2018 Gujarati musical comedy drama starring veteran Gujarati actor Monal Gajjar, Raunaq Kamdar, Mitra Gadhavi. The film is directed by Viral Rao and set to release for 19 October 2018, and produced by Alpesh Patel & Digesh Patel from Eva Entertainment LLP. Nationwide Release by Rupam Entertainment.

== Plot ==
Two best friends Ronak and JJ lead a middle-class lifestyle and dream of becoming rich. Things go south when they decide to take the help of an underworld don Altaf Anna to end their money troubles and to win the heart of a girl Riya.

== Cast ==
- Monal Gajjar as Riya
- Raunaq Kamdar as Ronak
- Mitra Gadhavi as JJ
- Smit Pandya as Altaf Anna
- Bharat Chawda as Aarav
- Mehul Buch as Riya's father

== Production ==
=== Development ===
The film is produced Viral Rao Alpesh Patel & Digesh Patel from Eva EntertainmentLLP and set to release for this Dussehra

== Soundtrack ==
Hemang Dholakia composed the songs of the film and the lyrics are penned by Krupesh Thacker & Milind Gadhavi.

All music is composed by Hemang Dholakia.

Tracklist
No.	Title	Lyrics	Singer(s)	Length
1.	"Prem Rang"	Krupesh Thacker	Shaan, Jhanvi Shrimankar, Parthiv Gohil	03:40
2.	"Jhoomo Re"	Milind Gadhavi	Parthiv Gohil, Hemang Dholakia	03:12
3.	"Tuti Tuti Re Sargam"	Milind Gadhavi	Javed Ali	03:16
4.	"Todi Didhi Chhe Mein"	Milind Gadhavi	Sunidhi Chauhan	02:57
5.	"Jay Ambe"	Bhavesh Upadhyay	Parthiv Gohil	03:34
