= Dhwani Gautam =

Indian film director and producer (born 1985)

Dhwanii M Gautam
- Born: 22 July 1985 (age 41); Gujarat, India
- Education: The Asian School; Marwah Studios Noida
- Occupations: Producer, Director and Writer
- Years active: 2007–present
- Organization: Dhwani Gautam Films
- Notable work: Heroes; Romance Complicated; Order Order Out of Order

Dhwanii M Gautam aka Dhwani Gautam (born 22 July 1985) is a filmmaker, director and writer known for Romance Complicated and Hoon Tari Heer. He predominantly works in the Gujarati Film Industry and Bollywood.

== Early life ==
Dhwanii M Gautam was born in Gujarat, received his schooling from The Asian School, and a degree in film-making from Marwah studios Noida. It all started when he was 13 years old when he watched Yash Chopra's Dilwale Dulhania Le Jayenge. Since then he decided to become a Film Director. Coming from a middle-class family it was quite tough to pursue the career into entertainment industry. He has worked as Radio Jockey in initial days in New Delhi. His struggle started when he shifted to Mumbai to pursue his career.

== Career ==
Hailing from a middle-class family based in Delhi, Gautam worked small jobs until he became an RJ for a while. Later, he moved to Mumbai. He was hired as an assistant director for the family drama, Baa Bahoo Aur Baby. Later he went on to work for three more serials. He later worked in the Sunny Deol starrer Heroes and the Bobby Deol starrer Nanhe Jaisalmer. After garnering experience in direction and writing, he went on to work for the Punjabi Film Industry.

In 2015, he started work on his own films Romance Complicated which was the first film of his as directorial debut, which was his dream project and it was the first film of Gujarati cinema which has been shot overseas. from that film he has also acted in negative character. Dhwani Gautam put his trust on India's raw star winner Darshan Raval as music director for Romance Complicated.

He made his television comeback with cooking show in 2018 named Great Gujarati Cooking Competition.

In 2019 he again come up with the Mr D Show - Get Funny with Dhwani, where 60+ artists such as Malhar Thakar, Parthiv Gohil, Manasi Parekh, Pooja Jhaveri, Raunaq Kamdar and many more came on the show. The show got telecast on Shemaroo Entertainment's OTT platform ShemarooMe.

In 2020 before the starting of pandemic he has started his one of the dream project named Kesariya with Malhar Thakar, Anshul Trivedi and Ritu Bhagwani. The rumor came that movie has stopped due to the lack of fund and Dhwani Gautam has denied it.

Post lock down he has shot the independent Gujarati music song with Geeta Rabari for the song name Pardesiya. and Valamiya 2.0. He has also directed the independent song named Hawa Karda Punjabi song featuring Shama Sikander.

End of 2021 he started his dream project named "Hoon Tari Heer" with Bharat Chawda, Puja Joshi, and Ojas Rawal.

His upcoming project named "Love Atrangi", starring Puja Joshi, Anshul Trivedi and Pooja Jhaveri very soon on the floor.

== Filmography ==
=== Assistant director ===
Year	Film
2007	Hats Off Productions
2008	Sagar Arts Vadodara
2008	Heroes

=== Films ===
Year	Film	Director	Actor	Associate Producer	Screenplay Writer	Language
2014	The Last Don		Yes			Gujarati
2016	Romance Complicated	Yes	Yes	Yes	Yes	Gujarati
2016	Tuu To Gayo	Yes	Yes	Yes	Yes	Gujarati
2018	Midnights with Menka		Yes			Gujarati
2019	Order Order Out Of Order	Yes	Yes	Yes	Yes	Gujarati
2020	Golkeri		Yes			Gujarati
2022	Hoon Tari Heer	Yes	Yes	Yes	Yes	Gujarati
2025	Bhai Bhai	Yes			Yes	Hindi
2026	Vaanki Chuki Love Story	Yes	Yes	Yes		Gujarati
2026	Dayro	Yes	Yes	Yes	Yes	Gujarati
2026	Shubh Saanj	Yes	Yes	Yes	Yes	Gujarati
2026	The Story of Patel Vs. Patrick	Yes	Yes	Yes	Yes	Gujarati
2026	Kesariya	Yes	Yes	Yes	Yes	Gujarati
2026	Love Atrangi	Yes	Yes	Yes	Yes	Gujarati

=== Television ===
Year	Series	Season	Director	Producer	Language	Network/Platform	Notes
2013	Jeevti Vaarta	1	Yes	Yes	Gujarati	VTV-Gujarati	serial
2017	Mr D Show	1	Yes	Yes	Gujarati	GTPL	Chat Show & Host
2018	Great Gujarat Cooking	1			Gujarati	GTPL	Coocking Show & Host
2019	Mr D Show - Get Funny With Dhwani.	2	Yes	Yes	Gujarati	Shemaroo Entertainment	Chat Show & Host
2019	Great Gujarat Cooking	2			Gujarati	News18 Gujarati	Coocking Show & Host

=== Music videos ===
Year	Song name	Director	Producer	Screenplay Writer	Language
2021	Valmiya 2.0	Yes	Yes	Yes	Gujarati
2021	Pardesiya	Yes	Yes	Yes	Gujarati
2021	Hawa Karda	Yes			Punjabi
