= Mit Jani =

Indian filmmaker

- Occupations: Film director; producer
- Years active: 2014–present
- Known for: Goonga Pehelwan, Hellaro
- Awards: National Film Award for Best Debut Film of a Director (2015)

Mit Jani is an Indian film director and producer who works in Gujarati cinema. He co-directed the documentary Goonga Pehelwan (2014), which won the National Film Award for Best Debut Film of a Director at the 62nd National Film Awards., and was a co-producer of Hellaro (2019), the first Gujarati film to win the National Film Award for Best Feature Film

== Early life and education ==
Mit Jani graduated with a BCom (Hons) in accounting from the Amrut Mody School of Management at Ahmedabad University in 2010, and qualified as a chartered accountant in 2012 before entering filmmaking.

== Career ==
Mit Jani co-directed Goonga Pehelwan with Prateek Gupta and Vivek Chaudhary, a documentary on the deaf wrestler Virender Singh Yadav. It highlighted the disparity in official recognition and financial support afforded to athletes with disabilities. The film's directors also campaigned for better conditions for deaf wrestlers. The Wrestling Federation of India later agreed to use visual signals for deaf competitors.; the Wrestling Federation of India subsequently agreed to provide referees using visual and tactile cues for deaf competitors.

Goonga Pehelwan won the Rajat Kamal (Silver Lotus) for Best Debut Film of a Director in the non-feature category at the 62nd National Film Awards, announced in March 2015. The directors attended the 46th International Film Festival of India in Panaji in November 2015, where the film was screened.

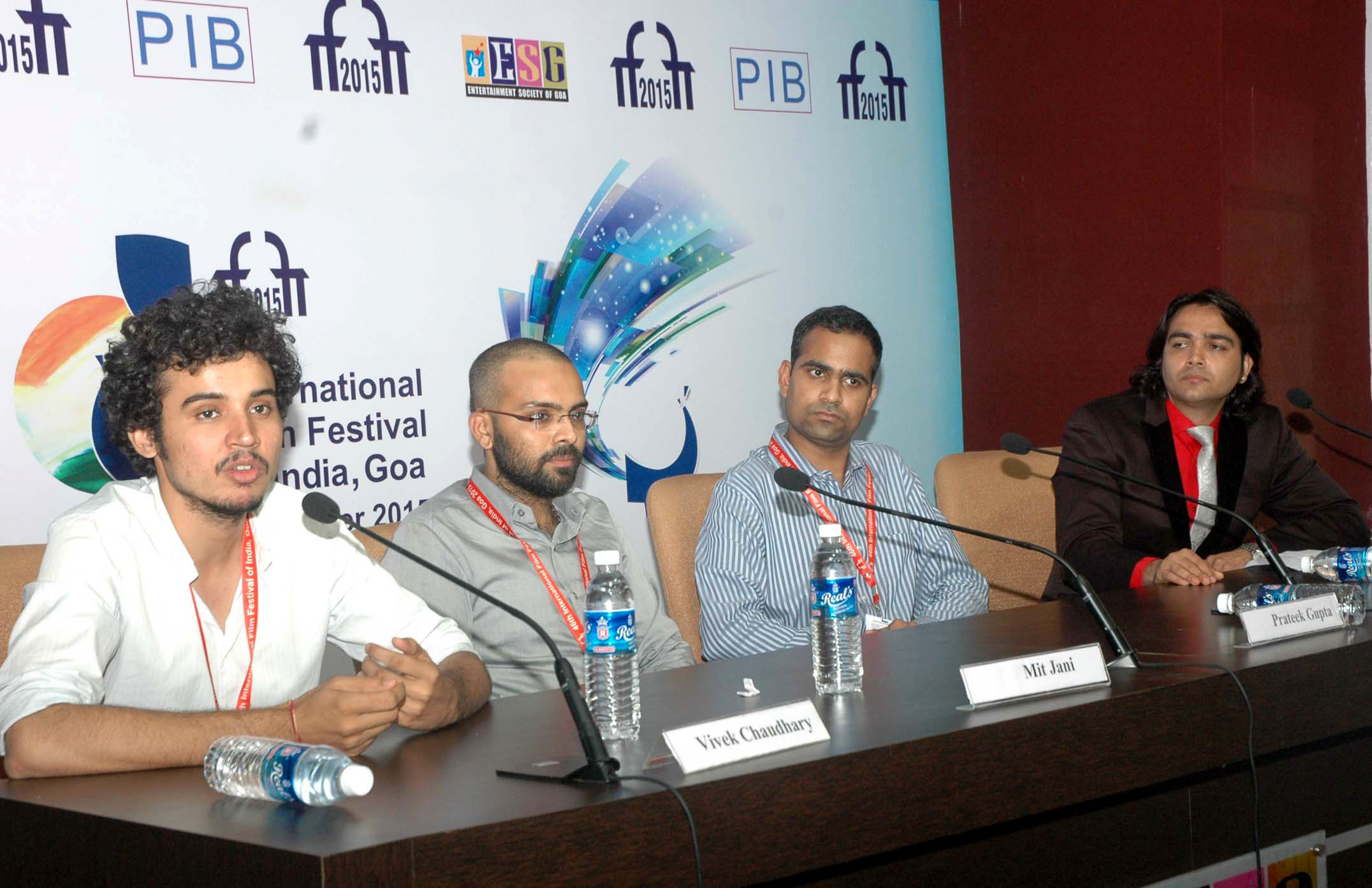
The Directors of the Non-Feature film – “Goonga Pehalwan”, Vivek Chaudhary, Prateek Gupta and Mit Jani at a press conference, at the 46th International Film Festival of India (IFFI-2015), in Panaji, Goa on November 21, 2015

He was a co-producer of Hellaro (2019), directed by Abhishek Shah. The film won the National Film Award for Best Feature Film at the 66th National Film Awards, the first Gujarati film to do so, and its thirteen lead actresses jointly received a Special Jury Award.

He went on to produce Kamthaan (2024), adapted from a novel by the Gujarati writer Ashwini Bhatt and directed by Dhrunad, and Dhabkaaro (2026), written and directed by Shah and co-produced with Nadiadwala Grandson Entertainment.

== Filmography ==
Year	Title	Role	Notes
2014	Goonga Pehelwan	Director	Documentary; co-directed with Prateek Gupta and Vivek Chaudhary
2019	Hellaro	Co-producer	
2024	Kamthaan	Producer	
2026	Dhabkaaro	Producer	

== Awards ==
Year	Award	Ceremony	Film	Result
2015	National Film Award for Best Debut Film of a Director (Non-Feature)	62nd National Film Awards	Goonga Pehelwan	Won
