= Kaushambi Bhatt =

Indian actress

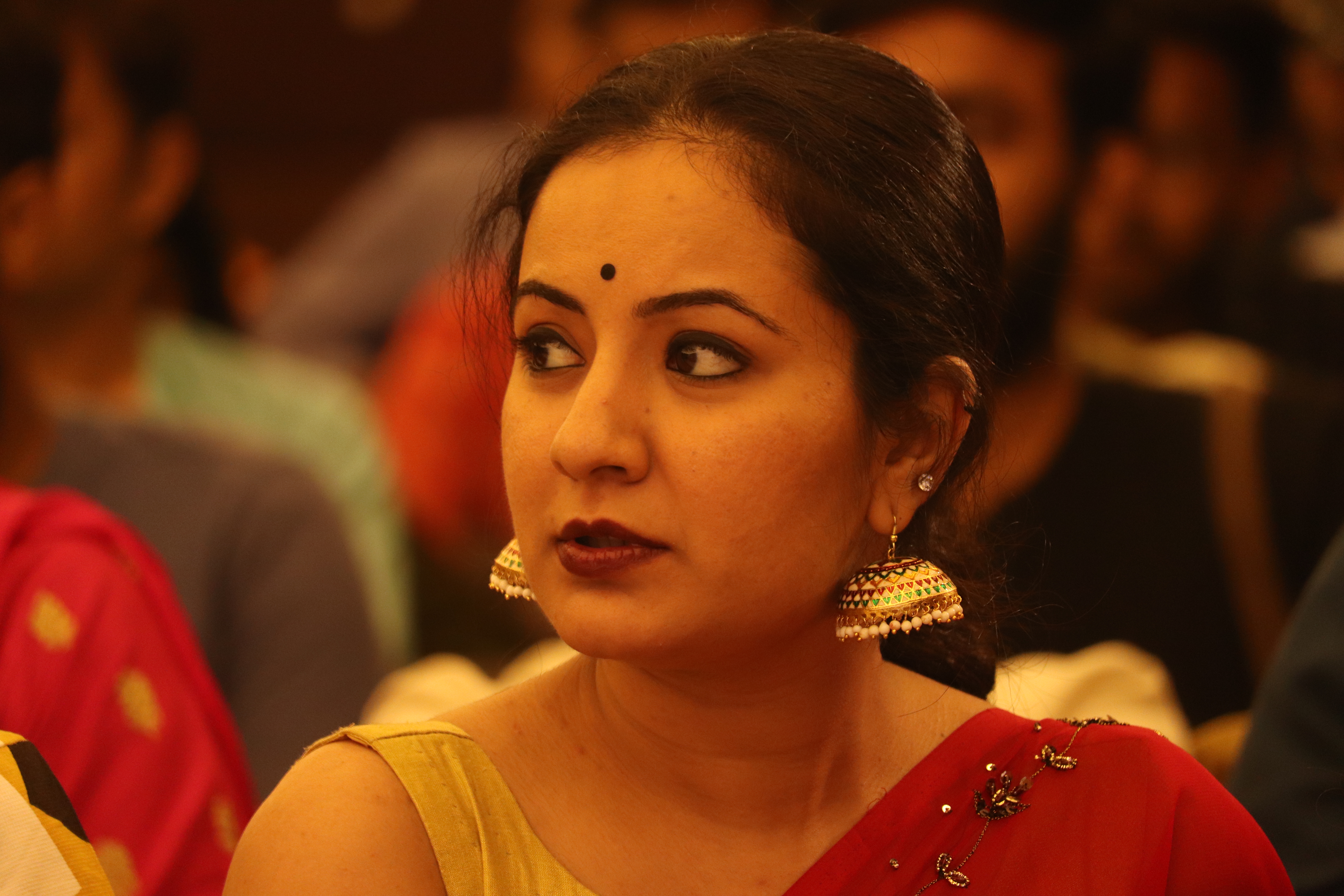
- Kaushambi Bhatt at trailer launch of Montu Ni Bittu on 27 July 2019 at Ahmedabad
- Born: 1 October 1991 (age 34); Rajkot, Gujarat, India
- Occupation: Actress

Kaushambi Bhatt (born 1 October 1991) is an Indian actress from Gujarat, India. She is known for her role in Gujarati films Hellaro (2019), Dhunki (2019) and Montu Ni Bittu (2019).

== Biography ==
Kaushambi Bhatt was born on 1 October 1991 in Rajkot, Gujarat. She received her school education in Rajkot and her college education at GLS College, Ahmedabad. She completed her master's degree in development communication from Gujarat University, Ahmedabad.

She debuted in the 2019 Gujarati period drama film Hellaro, which won the National Film Award for Best Feature Film at the 66th National Film Awards and she earned Special Jury Award for her performance. The film has been theatrically released in India on 8 November 2019 to positive reviews and her acting is appreciated by the audiences. She later acted in Vijaygiri Bava's romantic comedy Montu Ni Bittu, and in Anish Shah's Dhunki.

She is also known for her role in the Gujarati play Kaalu Etle Andhaaru.

== Awards and accolades ==
Year	Award	Category	Nominated work	Result	Ref.
2019	National Film Awards	Special Jury Award	Hellaro	Won	
2019	GIFA -Gujarati Iconic Film Award	Best Supporting Actress	Dhunki	Won	

== Filmography ==
Year	Film	Role
2019	Hellaro	Champa
2019	Dhunki	Ankita
2019	Montu Ni Bittu	Saubhagyalaxmi
2022	Nayika Devi: The Warrior Queen	
2023	Kutch Express	Diwali
2024	Bhalle Padharya	Sarita
2025	Faati Ne?	Leelavati
2025	Jalebi Rocks	Neelu
2025	Maharani	Kajal
2025	Misri	Pinky
2025	Auntypreneur	
