= Malhar Pandya =

Indian actor

Malhar Pandya is an Indian actor.

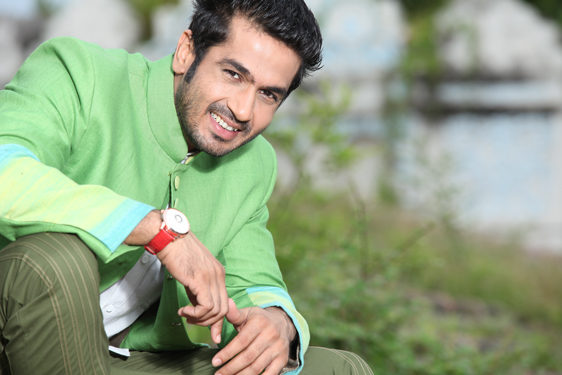

== Early life ==
Pandya was born 9 November to a Gujarati family in Ahmedabad, Gujarat. He won the title of Mr. Gujarat by winning a body-building competition.

== Career ==
Pandya acted in Hindi television shows, Ramayan (2012) and Hamari Saas Leela (2011). He also acted in Life OK’s mythological drama, Devon Ke Dev...Mahadev (2011–2014).

In 2015, Pandya appeared in two Gujarati films, Romance Complicated directed by Dhwani Gautam and Premji Rise of A Warrior. In 2016, he appeared in Balaji Telefilms fiction show Kasam Tere Pyaar Ki on Colors TV as Pawan Malhotra, the main male antagonist. Later, in the same year he appeared in Balaji Telefilms weekend horror/thriller show Kavach... Kaali Shaktiyon Se on Colors TV as a psychiatrist and Balaji Telefilms weekend fantasy show Naagin 2 on Colors TV as well, as an 'ichchhadhaari naag' as a cameo

== Personal life ==
Pandya’s father Laxmikant Pandya is a director, writer, actor and lyricist of television industry. His mother Bharti Pandya is also a Gujarati theatre actress. In 2014, he married Priya Patidar, a Bollywood singer.

== Films ==
Year	Title	Role	Language	Notes
2015	Premji: Rise of a Warrior	Roy	Gujarati	
2016	Romance Complicated	Dev Patel	Gujarati	

== Television ==
Year	Serial	Role
2011	Hamari Saas Leela	Harsh Parekh
2011–2014	Devon Ke Dev...Mahadev	Aniruddha / Lakhsmichandra
2012–2013	Ramayan	Hanuman
2015–2016	Suryaputra Karn	Balarama
2016	Kasam Tere Pyaar Ki	Pawan Malhotra
2016	Kavach... Kaali Shaktiyon Se	Dr. Akaash Mehra
2016	Naagin 2	Nishank
2018	Ishqbaaaz	Jai Kothari
2019	Laal Ishq	Bharat
2019	Aghori	Aghori Indra
2019	Nazar	Angad
2020	RadhaKrishn	Karna
2024–2025	Shrimad Ramayan	Vali / Sugriva
2025	Veer Hanuman - Bolo Bajrang Bali Ki Jai	Surya
