= Montu Ni Bittu =

2019 Indian Gujarati comedy film

- Official poster
- Directed by: Vijaygiri Bava
- Written by: Prarthi Dholakia; Raam Mori
- Produced by: Twinkle Vijaygiri
- Starring: Maulik Nayak; Aarohi Patel
- Cinematography: Subrat Khatoi
- Edited by: Prateek Gupta
- Music by: Mehul Surti
- Production company: Vijaygiri Filmos
- Release date: 23 August 2019
- Running time: 133 minutes
- Country: India
- Language: Gujarati

Montu Ni Bittu is a 2019 Indian Gujarati-language comedy film directed by Vijaygiri Bava and produced by Twinkle Vijaygiri under the banner of Vijaygiri Filmos. The story was written by Prarthi Dholakia and Raam Mori. The film starring Maulik Nayak and Aarohi Patel is a story of childhood friends Montu and Bittu. It was released on 23 August 2019.

== Plot ==
Montu and Bittu were childhood friends. Montu was in love with Bittu since back then. When the family talked about Bittu's marriage, he was still considered a friend. This was not a problem, but when people considered him as the probable groom for Bittu, things become complicated. This story will drive them through an emotional journey.

== Cast ==
The cast are as follows:

- Maulik Nayak as Montu
- Aarohi Patel as Bittu
- Mehul Solanki as Abhinav
- Hemang Shah as Dadi
- Happy Bhavasar as Mohini
- Kaushambi Bhatt as Saubhagyalakshmi

== Production ==
The story and dialogues were written by Raam Mori. and the screenplay was written by Raam Mori, prarthi dholakia and Vijaygiri Bava The film was directed by Vijaygiri Bava and produced by Twinkle Vijaygiri under the banner of Vijaygiri Filmos. "Rangdariyo" song was shot in Diu.

== Marketing and release ==
The trailer was released on 27 July 2019. "Jay Ma Bhadrakali" was released first for the promotion of the film. The film was released on 23 August 2019. The film was later released on the streaming platform ShemarooMe in April 2020.

== Soundtrack ==
Montu Ni Bittu

Soundtrack album by Mehul Surti
- Released: 2019
- Recorded: 2019
- Studio: Songbird Digital
- Genre: Feature film soundtrack
- Length: 20:28
- Language: Gujarati
- Label: Jazz Music
- Producer: Twinkle Vijaygiri
External audio
- Official Audio Jukebox on YouTube

All music is composed by Mehul Surti.

Track listing
No.	Title	Lyrics	Singer(s)	Length
1.	"Rangdariyo"	Parth Tarpara	Aishwarya Majmudar, Mehul Surti (Backing vocals)	4:23
2.	"Jay Maa Bhadrakali"	Chirag Tripathi	Parthiv Gohil	3:37
3.	"Pakki Amdavadi"	Dilip Dave	Siddharth Bhavsar	4:02
4.	"Pardeshi Mena"	Milind Gadhavi	Aditya Gadhvi	2:28
5.	"Gholu Gholu – Lagnageet"	Milind Gadhavi	Nutan Surti	3:09
6.	"Bittu Ha Bol"	Parth Tarpara	Dhvanit Thaker	1:34
Total length:				20:28

== Reception ==
Bhavin Raval of Gujarati Mid-day rated it 3.5 out of 5. He praised the direction, music, acting, production and cinematography but criticised the slow opening and performance of Solanki. Tushar Dave and Niraj Solanki have praised the film in their reviews and gave a special mention for Aarohi Patel's role and acting.

== Accolades ==
Vijaygiri Bava was awarded the Best Director Award at the 19th Transmedia Gujarati Screen and Stage Awards for the film.
