= Builder Boys =

2024 film directed by Chanakya Patel

- Official Poster
- Directed by: Chanakya Patel
- Written by: Chanakya Patel
- Produced by: Neha Rajora; Setu Kushal Patel
- Starring: Raunaq Kamdar; Shivam Parekh; Esha Kansara
- Cinematography: Aditya Sharma
- Production companies: Nine Muses Creations LLP; White Elephant Films
- Distributed by: Rupam Entertainment Pvt Ltd
- Release date: 5 July 2024
- Running time: 122 minutes
- Country: India
- Language: Gujarati

Builder Boys is a 2024 Gujarati comedy drama, directed and written by Chanakya Patel. It stars Raunaq Kamdar Shivam Parekh, Esha Kansara, and others. The film is produced by Neha Rajora, and Setu Kushal Patel. The film will be distributed by Rupam Entertainment Pvt Ltd.

== Plot ==
Two friends, a broker and a civil engineer, dream of becoming builders but lack funds and land. They seize an opportunity in an old residential building for redevelopment and try to win over the residents for the project. However, a superstitious real estate tycoon sees it as his lucky charm, complicating their plans.

== Cast ==
- Raunaq Kamdar
- Shivam Parekh
- Esha Kansara
- Shekhar Shukla
- Kalpana Gagdekar
- Sunil Vaghela
- Bhavini Jani
- Kuldip Shukla
- Premal Yagnik
- Hemin Trivedi
- Anshu Joshi
- Mamta Bhavsar
- Rudraksh nisiddh panchal

== Production ==
The film was shot at various locations in Ahmedabad Gujarat. Siddharth Amit Bhavsar has given the music in the film. The casting of the film has been done by Ekta Shah. The production has been designed by Chintan Rajnikant. The film has been edited by Neha Rajora.

== Soundtrack ==
Builder Boys

Studio album by Siddharth Amit Bhavsar
- Released: 18 June 2024
- Genre: Feature film soundtrack
- Label: Nine Muse Creations LLP

=== Tracklist ===
All lyrics are written by Niren Bhatt, Siddharth Amit Bhavsar; all music is composed by Siddharth Amit Bhavsar.

No.	Title	Lyrics	Music	Singer(s)	Length
1.	"Sapna Sapna"	Niren Bhatt	Siddharth Amit Bhavsar	Raghav Kaushik & Siddharth Amit Bhavsar	2:52
2.	"Amasti Re"	Siddharth Amit Bhavsar	Siddharth Amit Bhavsar	Siddharth Amit Bhavsar, Divya Kumar (singer), Madhubanti Bagchi	3:00
Total length:					05:52

== Reception ==
Kanksha Vasavada of The Times of India rated it 3.5 out of 5. She praised the "fresh concept", story and performances. Rachna Joshi of Mid-Day Gujarati rated it 3 out of 5. She praised performances, story, direction and music but she criticised slow first half and montage.

== See also ==
- List of Gujarati films of 2024
