= Dhunki =

2019 Gujarati-language drama film

- Official poster
- Directed by: Anish Shah
- Written by: Anish Shah; Kuldip Patel
- Produced by: Kuldip Patel; Jay Shah; Anish Shah
- Starring: Pratik Gandhi; Deeksha Joshi; Vishal Shah; Kaushambi Bhatt
- Cinematography: Sreekumar Nair
- Edited by: Sreekumar Nair
- Music by: Siddharth Bhavsar
- Production company: November Films
- Release date: 26 July 2019
- Running time: 135 minutes
- Country: India
- Language: Gujarati

Dhunki (transl. Trance) is a 2019 Indian Gujarati drama film directed by Anish Shah and produced by Kuldip Patel, Jay Shah, and Anish Shah himself under the banner of November Films. The film starring Pratik Gandhi, Deeksha Joshi, Vishal Shah, Kaushambi Bhatt, revolves around two partners (played by Gandhi and Joshi), who face challenges to establish their startup company. It was released on 26 July 2019.

== Plot ==
Nikunj (Pratik Gandhi) and Shreya (Deeksha Joshi) work for a software company where they are QA lead and an app developer respectively. Nikunj's career takes a turn for worse when during one of the presentations of a new app to client Mr. Shroff (Jaimini Pathak) it crashes. The entire blame is transferred to Nikunj but already being overworked he decides to quit the job. He tries to get a job at different companies in Ahmedabad but since they can't match the package he finds himself jobless. During one such interview visits, he has food outside and realizes he can do a better job of cooking. Since he likes cooking and finds it relaxing too, he decides to pursue his passion as a career.

As Nikunj progresses through his business he soon realizes he can't manage the orders through traditional methods. That’s when Shreya proposes he should build an app and Nikunj decides to have Shreya onboard to handle the technology and marketing side of things. As the startup grows, work hours become unmanageable causing trouble in maintaining the work-life balance for both the partners, especially for Shreya as she is about to marry a doctor who is skeptical about the startup idea. Nikunj and Shreya deal with challenges in finding the right investor, keeping the business afloat and while doing so also managing their personal life challenges. As they fail to find the investor, their startup has burnt through all the money and all of their staff has either left or has been relieved due to finances. The duo go to deliver an order who is a regular customer who turns out to be Mr. Shroff. He listens to their challenges and asks them to pitch their startup to him for venture capital.

== Cast ==
- Pratik Gandhi as Nikunj
- Deeksha Joshi as Shreya
- Vishal Shah as Hardik
- Kaushambi Bhatt as Ankita
- Jaimini Pathak as Mr. Shroff
- Dipak Shekhar as Delivery boy

== Production ==
The title of the film was suggested by lyricist, Niren Bhatt.

== Soundtrack ==
Dhunki

Soundtrack album by Siddharth Amit Bhavsar
- Released: 17 July 2019
- Genre: Feature film soundtrack
- Length: 14:34
- Label: November Films

Music for the film is composed by Siddharth Amit Bhavsar and lyrics are written by Niren Bhatt.

Track list
| No. | Title | Lyrics | Singer(s) | Length |
|---|---|---|---|---|
| 1. | "Dhunki" | Niren Bhatt | Siddharth Amit Bhavsar, Yashika Sikka | 3:10 |
| 2. | "Nazam Navi" | Niren Bhatt | Jigardan Gadhavi | 3:45 |
| 3. | "Rasta Khovaaya" | Niren Bhatt | Siddharth Amit Bhavsar | 3:37 |
| 4. | "Navu Aa Sapnu" | Niren Bhatt | Soham Naik, Yashita Sharma | 4:02 |
| Total length: | | | | 14:34 |

== Release ==
The film was released on 26 July 2019. It released on streaming platform Amazon Prime Video on 25 August 2019.

== Reception ==
The film received positive reviews. Abhimanyu Mishra writing for The Times of India reviewed it positively saying, "Overall, the film is pleasing to watch. Brilliant performances, amazing direction and great music surely come together for an effort that’s praiseworthy. If you are a dreamer and want to follow what you desire, Dhunki is what you need." He rated it 3.5 out of 5 stars. Mid-Day reviewed positively, praised it for acting and details and rated it 3 out of 5 stars.

== Accolades ==
Deeksha Joshi won Best Actress-Gujarati award at Critics Choice Film Awards 2020.

Kaushambi Bhatt won GIFA -Gujarati Iconic Film Award in Best Supporting Actress category.
