= Darshan Pandya =

Indian actor

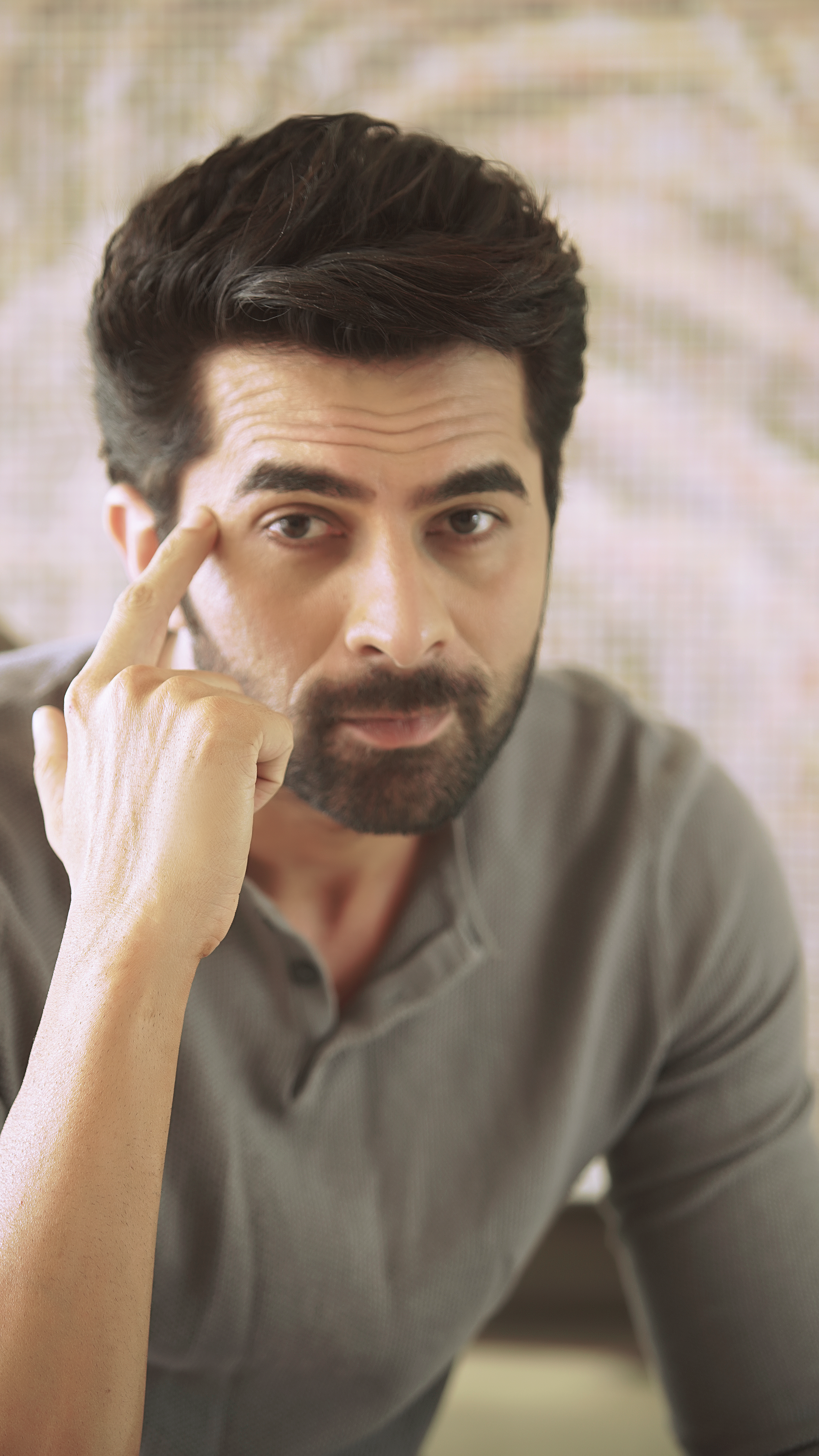
- Pandya in 2019
- Born: 18 March
- Occupations: Actor, Businessman
- Years active: 10

Darshan Pandya is an Indian actor, known for his portrayals as Aditya Verma in Aapki Antara, Vineet Raizaada in Kya Huaa Tera Vaada and Dr. Aman Malhotra in Itna Karo Na Mujhe Pyaar. He acted as a spy in the movie, Parmanu: The Story of Pokhran. Recently he did a web series "RAAZI" for voot.

== Acting career ==
Darshan has worked on several theatrical shows with renowned theatre personality, Manoj Shah, through his theatre company, Ideas Unlimited. He has also done several voice-overs and Gujarati TV shows. Darshan's first appearance on Indian television as a main lead was with Aapki Antara on Zee TV in 2009 where he played Aditya Verma. Later in 2011, he played the antagonist Devashish Mukherji a.k.a. Ashmit Kapoor in Yahaaan Main Ghar Ghar Kheli. He then went on to play Vineet Raizada in the 2012 show, Kya Huaa Tera Vaada on Sony Entertainment Television. Then He went on and played very humorous character Dr. Aman Malhotra in Balaji Telefilms show, Itna Karo Na Mujhe Pyaar along with Ronit Roy and Pallavi Kulkarni among others on Sony Entertainment. He did a film in 2018 Parmanu for JA entertainment, he played a character of Pakistani agent Sajjan. In 2023, Darshan debuted in gujarti with film named hello Recently he did a web series "RAAZI" for Voot. In 2024 Dharshan played role of Alloudin Khilji in gujarati film named kasoombo, which later dubbed in hindi and released pan india as well. In 2025 he played RK Dhawan in Emeregency which produced and directed by Kangana Ranaut

== Television ==
Year	Show	Role	Notes
2009-2010	Aapki Antara	Aditya Verma / Abhishek Verma	Main Lead
2011-2012	Yahaaan Main Ghar Ghar Kheli	Devashish Mukherji a.k.a. Ashmit Kapoor	Antagonist
2012	Kya Hua Tera Vaada	Vineet Raizaada	Parallel Lead
2014–2015	Itna Karo Na Mujhe Pyaar	Dr. Aman Malhotra	Parallel Lead
2015-2016	Yeh Hai Mohabbatein	Prateek Sharma	Supporting Role (Cameo)
2017	Queens Hain Hum	Pushkar Katial	Cameo
2020	Dil Yeh Ziddi Hai	Manu Bhargav	Supporting Role

== Filmography ==
Year	Film	Role
2018	Parmanu: The Story of Pokhran	Pakistani spy - Sajjan
2022	Ram Setu	Pakistani Archaeologist
2023	Hello	ACP Kanishq Bharadwaj
2024	Kasoombo	Allauddin Khilji
2025	Emergency (2025 film)	R. K. Dhawan

=== Web series ===
Year	Title	Role	Ref.
2023	Class	Inspector Bindya	
2024	Gunaah	Joki Karve(JK)	
