= Gunah =

Gunah may refer to:

- Gunah, a Persian word referring to sin, specifically Islamic views on sin
- Gunah (TV series), a 2023 Pakistani miniseries
- "Gunah" (United States of Al), a 2022 TV episode

== See also ==
- Gunaah (disambiguation)
