= Order Order Out of Order =

2019 Gujarati courtroom film by Dhwani Gautam

Order Order Out Of Order
- Theatrical release poster
- Directed by: Dhwani Gautam
- Written by: Vipul Sharma; Dhwani Gautam; Shyam Khandhedia
- Produced by: Shyam Khandhedia; Rahul Savani
- Starring: Raunaq Kamdar; Gaurav Paswala; Jinal Belani; Dharmesh Vyas; Mansi Patel; Anang Desai; Prem Gadhavi; Ojas Rawal; Manan Desai; Shekhar Shukla; Hemang Dave; Neha Reddy; Nikhil Harsh; Prashant Barot; Yagnesh Dave
- Cinematography: Prashant Gohel
- Edited by: Harkirat Singh Lal
- Music by: Rahul Munjariya
- Production companies: Spark Films & Company; Gemini Engi-Fab Limited
- Distributed by: Pen India Limited
- Release date: 1 February 2019
- Running time: 134 minutes
- Country: India
- Language: Gujarati

Order Order Out of Order (Gujarati: ઓર્ડર ઓર્ડર આઉટ ઓફ ઓર્ડર) is a 2019 Gujarati courtroom drama starring Jinal Belani, Raunaq Kamdar and Gaurav Paswala. On a concept created by Shyam Khandhedia, the film was directed by Dhwani Gautam and produced by Shyam Khandhedia and Rahul Savani under banner of Spark Films & Company. The film was released in India by Pen India Limited on 1 February 2019.

== Plot ==
The film focuses on the story of two brothers Yash Thakkar and Raj Thakkar, who are fighting their inner demons. After training as lawyers, they decide to follow the path of truth and honesty. While doing so, they establish their own firm. One such case changes their lives and leaves them in turmoil.

== Cast ==
- Raunaq Kamdar
- Jinal Belani
- Gaurav Paswala
- Dharmesh Vyas
- Minal Patel
- Anang Desai
- Prem Gadhavi
- Shekhar Shukla
- Hemang Dave
- Neha Reddy
- Nikhil Harsh
- Ojas Rawal
- Manan Desai
- Prashant Barot
- Yagnesh Dave

== Production ==
The film was produced by Shyam Khandhedia and Rahul Savani for Spark Films and Company. The story and concept was created by Shyam Khandhedia. Rahul Munjariya is music director of the film. KK made his debut in Gujarati Film industry in the film.

Shooting started in mid-September 2018 in some parts of Ahmedabad,

The soundtrack of the album is composed by Rahul Munjaria with lyrics written by Bhargav Purohit. The soundtrack album consists of two tracks released by Zee Music Company

== Marketing and release ==
The official trailer of the film was released by Spark Films on 28 December 2018. The film was released on 1 February 2019.

== Reception ==
Abhimanyu Mishra of The Times of India rated 3 stars out of 5. He praised editing and strong performances of actors.
