= Mehul Surti =

Music composer and singer

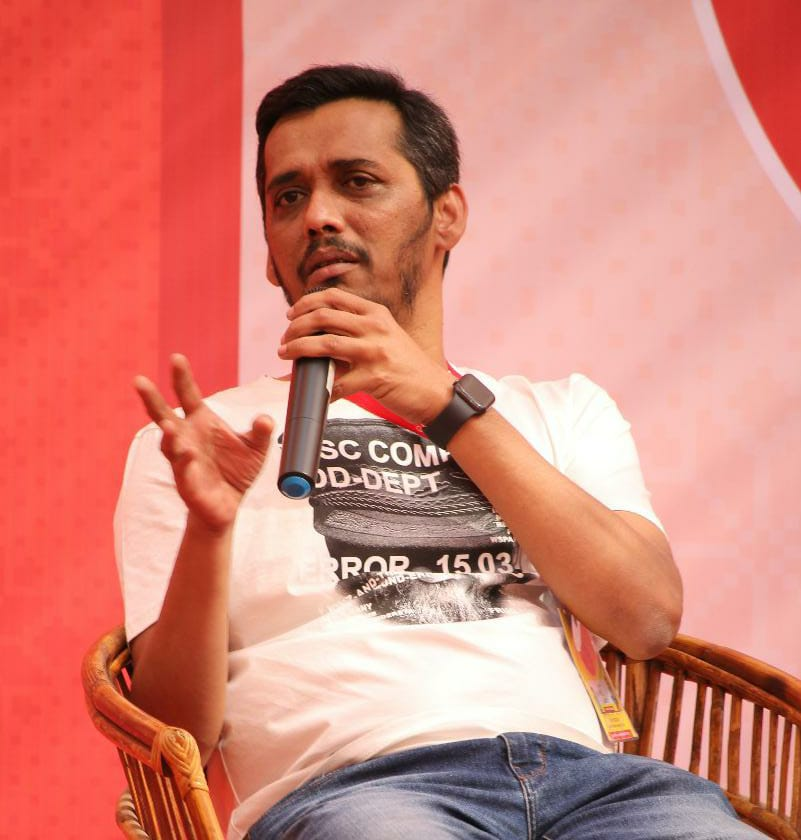
- Mehul Surti at Gujarat Literature Festival, Ahmedabad in 2019
- Born: 16 November 1977 (age 48); Surat, Gujarat, India
- Occupations: Music composer, Singer
- Years active: 1999-present

Mehul Surti (born 16 November 1977) in an Indian music composer and singer from Surat, Gujarat, India, known for his work in Gujarati cinema and Gujarati theatre. He has composed music for several successful Gujarati films including Kevi Rite Jaish (2012), Vitamin She (2017), Montu Ni Bittu (2019), Short Circuit (2019), Hellaro (2019), 21mu Tiffin (2021), Kamthaan (2024), and Kasoombo (2024).

== Early life ==
He was born on 16 November 1977 to Dhansukhlal Surti, a doctor, and Manjulaben Surti, a teacher. After his school education, he tried getting a diploma in Mechanical Engineering, which he did not complete. He is trained in the musical traditions of Kirana gharana and Mewati gharana.

== Career ==
He started his career as a music director at the age of 22 by composing songs for the 1999 Gujarati film Narmada Tara Vahi Jata Pani, directed by Kirit Panwalla. He later composed music for several Gujarati films including Kevi Rite Jaish (2012), Aapne to Dhirubhai (2014), Je Pan Kahish E Sachuj Kahish (2016), Passport (2016), Kookh (2016), Vitamin She (2017), Montu Ni Bittu (2019), Short Circuit (2019), and National Film Award winning film Hellaro (2019). For Hellaro, he won GIFA -Gujarati Iconic Film Award in two categories: Best Music Director and Best Background Score.

He has composed background score for several plays which include Priya Pappa have To, Aakhar Ni Aatmakatha, Khelando, Koi Pan Ek Phoolnu Naam Bolo To, Samudramanthan and Dhaad. He has composed over 200 poems of various Gujarati poets including Narmad, Umashankar Joshi, Ardeshar Khabardar, Mareez, Jayant Pathak, Mukul Choksi, and Saumya Joshi.

== Filmography ==
As music director:

- Narmada Tara Vahi Jata Pani (2002)
- Kevi Rite Jaish (2012)
- Aapne to Dhirubhai (2014)
- Je Pan Kahish E Sachuj Kahish (2016)
- Passport (2016)
- Kookh (2016)
- Vitamin She (2017)
- Montu Ni Bittu (2019)
- Hellaro (2019)
- Short Circuit (2019)
- 21mu Tiffin (2021)
- Kamthaan (2024)
- Kasoombo (2024)
- Umbarro (2025)
- Shastra (2025)

== Albums ==
The albums he has released include:

- Narmad dhara (poetry of Narmad)
- Prem Shaurya Gujarat
- Saaraansh
- Saatatya
- Hasta Ramta
- Adadhi Ramat Thi

== Accolades ==
Awards	Category	Film	Year	Ref.
12th Transmedia Gujarati Screen & Stage Awards	Best Music Director	Kevi Rite Jaish	2012	
GIFA -Gujarati Iconic Film Award	Best Background Music	Je Pan Kahish E Sachuj Kahish	2016	
19th Transmedia Gujarati Screen and Stage Awards	Best Music Director	Montu Ni Bittu	2019	
GIFA -Gujarati Iconic Film Award	Best Music Director	Montu Ni Bittu	2019	
Gujarat State Film Awards	Best Music Director	Hellaro	2019	
