= Goonga Pehelwan =

- Directed by: Mit Jani; Prateek Gupta; Vivek Chaudhary
- Written by: Mit Jani; Prateek Gupta; Vivek Chaudhary
- Edited by: Prateek Gupta; Jimmy Desai
- Release date: 31 October 2014 (Seattle South Asian Film Festival)
- Country: India

Goonga Pehelwan (from Hindi गूंगा पहलवान, meaning Mute wrestler) is a documentary film on the life and struggles of Virender Singh Yadav who is regarded as one of India's most accomplished deaf athletes. The documentary, which released in 2014, is an attempt to bring to light the unequal treatment and opportunities that disabled athletes have been on the receiving end of from the government and society. Another aim of the film is to enforce a change on the policy level which will benefit disabled athletes through inclusion and cash awards. The documentary was directed by Mit Jani, Prateek Gupta and Vivek Chaudhary, and produced by Drishti media. Both parties are based in Ahmedabad, Gujarat.

== Synopsis ==
The inspiration for the documentary came from a news article that one of the directors, Vivek Chaudhary, had come across. The article discussed Virender Sing, a deaf and mute wrestler who, at the time, despite being a World Champion and Deaflympics Gold Medalist, was fairly unknown to the country. The biopic follows Singh's journey in his attempts to represent India at the Rio Olympics 2016. One aim of the film is to bring to light as well as rectify the inequality in treatment and opportunities that disabled athletes receive.The filmmakers have filed a number of Right to Information (RTI) appeals and a Public Interest Litigation (PIL) in the making of the film.

== Accolades ==
The film was the winner of the 62nd National Film Award for 2014 in the Best Debut Film of a Director (Non-Feature) Category. It was selected as the opening film of the Indian Panorama at the International Film Festival of India, Goa. Goonga Pehelwan received a special mention at the International Documentary and Short Film Festival, Kerala, 2014, and was screened at the VIBGYOR International Film Festival. The film also won Best Film awards at the International Film Festival for Persons with Disabilities, 2015 (organized by NFDC) and the We Care Film Festival, 2015.

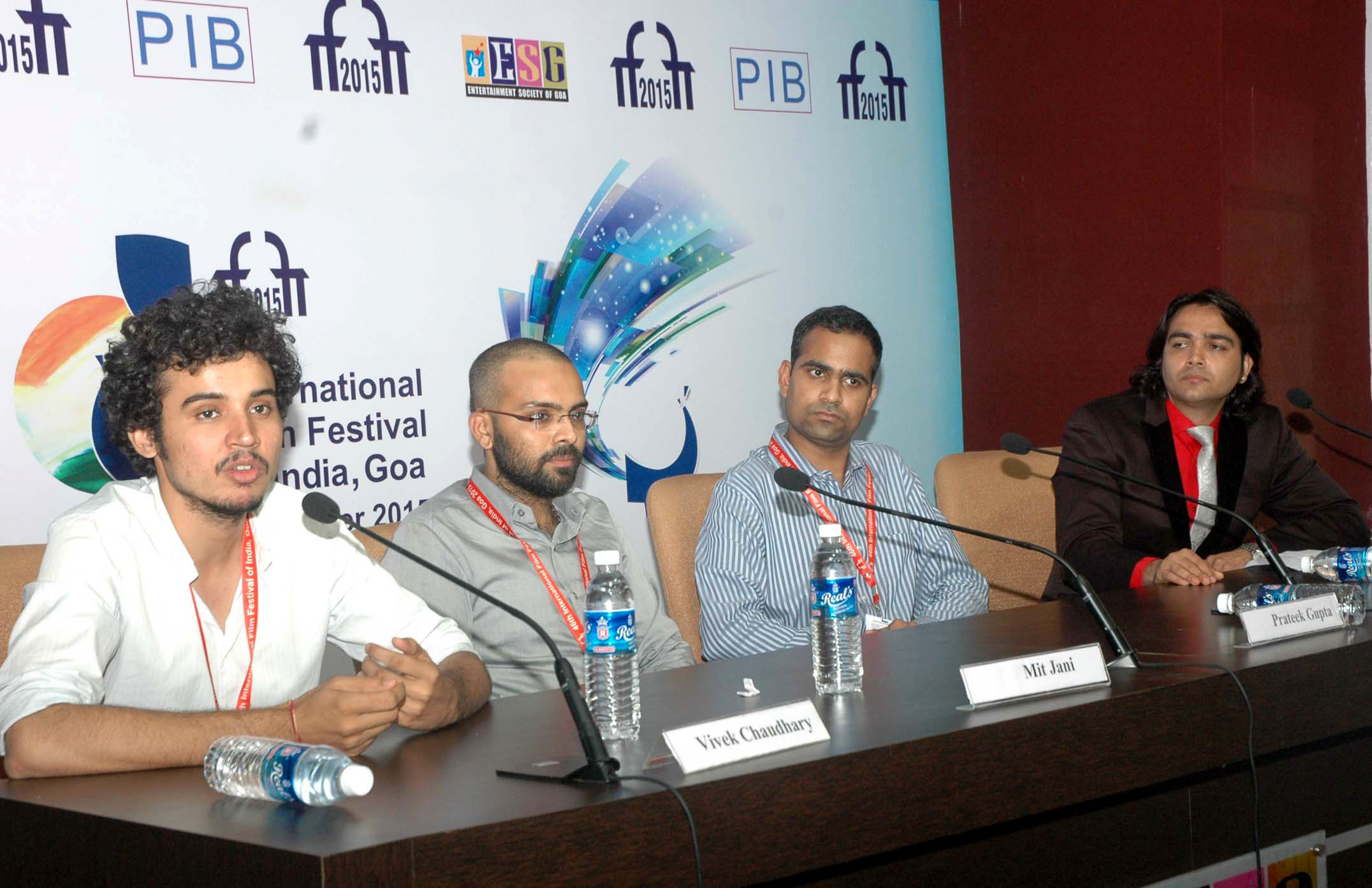
Film crew at IFFI (2015)

Goonga Pehelwan the film was also showcased at the following film festivals:

- 62nd National Film Awards, 2015
- International Film Festival of India, Goa
- International Film Festival for Persons with Disabilities (NFDC)
- International Documentary and Short Film Festival of Kerala, 2014
- Input Film Festival, Netherlands, 2014
- 4th All Sports Los Angeles Film Festival, 2014
- River to River Florence Indian Film Festival, 2014
- 9th Seattle South Asian Film Festival, 2014
- VIBGYOR International Film Festival, 2014
- Delhi International Film Festival, 2014
- International Documentary and Short Film Awards Jakarta, 2014
- 5th Mongolia International Film Festival, 2014
- International Film Festival of Prayag, 2014
- We Care Film Festival, 2015
