= 21mu Tiffin =

2021 Indian Gujarati film

- Directed by: Vijaygiri Bava
- Screenplay by: Vijaygiri Bava; Raam Mori
- Story by: Raam Mori
- Based on: 21mu Tiffin by Raam Mori
- Produced by: Twinkle Vijaygiri, H & H Movies
- Starring: Niilam Paanchal; Raunaq Kamdar; Netri Trivedi
- Cinematography: Parth Chauhan
- Edited by: Alok Mehta; Vijaygiri Bava
- Music by: Mehul Surti
- Production company: Vijaygiri Filmos
- Release date: 10 December 2021
- Running time: 128 minutes
- Country: India
- Language: Gujarati

21mu Tiffin (Gujarati: ૨૧મું ટિફિન, transl. 21st Tiffin) is a 2021 Indian Gujarati-language drama film directed by Vijaygiri Bava, produced by Twinkle Vijaygiri under the banner Vijaygiri FilmOS. It is based on 21mu Tiffin, a short story by Raam Mori. The film is about a woman running a tiffin service business. It was released on 10 December 2021.

== Plot ==
A woman running a tiffin service business meets her 21st tiffin customer and how it changes everything. She overcomes her obstacles despite her struggles.

== Cast ==
- Niilam Paanchal as Neetu ni Mummy
- Raunaq Kamdar as Dhruv
- Netri Trivedi as Neetal

== Production ==
The film is directed and scripted by Vijaygiri Bava. It is produced by Twinkle Vijaygiri under the banner Vijaygiri FilmOs and Hiren Gosai under the banner of H & H Movies. It is an adaptation of 21mu Tiffin, a story from the Sahitya Akademi award winning short story collection Mahotu by Raam Mori.

== Soundtrack ==
"Raah Jue Shangar Adhuro", sung by Mahalakshmi Iyer and composed by Mehul Surti, was released on 12 November 2021 on YouTube and was received positively by the audience.

21mu Tiffin

Soundtrack album by Mehul Surti
- Released: 2021
- Recorded: 2021
- Genre: Feature film soundtrack
- Length: 3:26
- Language: Gujarati
- Label: Vijaygiri Filmos
- Producer: Twinkle Vijaygiri
External audio
- Official Song on YouTube

All lyrics are written by Parth Tarapara; all music is composed by Mehul Surti.

Track listing
No.	Title	Lyrics	Singer(s)	Length
1.	"Raah Jue Shangar Adhuro"	Parth Tarpara	Mahalakshmi Iyer	3:26
Total length:				3:26

== Release ==
The trailer was released on 1 December 2021 on YouTube. The film was released on 10 December 2021.

== Reception ==
Sonal Pandya of Cinestaan rated it 3 out of 5. She praised the themes of gender bias and patriarchy, comparing it to 2021 Malayalam film The Great Indian Kitchen. She also praised story, direction, performances and music. Nirali Kalani writing for Mid-Day praised the script, acting, dialogue and message of the film. Niraj Solanki, a social media reviewer, has said this film a Magnum Opus and praised it in all cinematic aspects.

== Accolades ==
The film was selected for the Toronto International Women Film Festival 2021. It was declared a winner at the WRPN Women's International Film Festival 2021. It was selected and screened at the 16th Tasveer South Asian Film Festival in September 2021. It was also selected and screened at the 52nd International Film Festival of India under the Indian Panorama Selections in November 2021. It also competed for the ICFT UNESCO Gandhi Medal there.
