= Kasoombo =

2024 Indian Gujarati historical drama film

- Official Poster
- Directed by: Vijaygiri Bava
- Written by: Raam Mori, Vijaygiri Bava
- Based on: Amar Balidan by Vimalkumar Dhami
- Produced by: Vijaygiri Bava; Twinkle Bava; Nilay Chotai; Dipen Patel; Krishnadev Yagnik; Jayesh Pavra; Pravin Patel; Tushar Shah
- Starring: Raunaq Kamdar; Dharmendra Gohil; Darshan Pandya; Chetan Dhanani; Shraddha Dangar; Monal Gajjar; Firoz Irani
- Cinematography: Gargey Trivedi
- Edited by: Vijaygiri Bava, Ashish Oza, Kanu Prajapati
- Production companies: Vijaygiri FilmOs; Ananta Businesscorp; Patel Processing; Big Box Series
- Distributed by: Rupam Entertainment Pvt Ltd
- Release dates: 16 February 2024 (Gujarati); 3 May 2024 (Hindi)
- Running time: 156 minute
- Country: India
- Languages: Gujarati; Hindi
- Budget: ₹15 crore (US$1.6 million)

Kasoombo is an Indian Gujarati historical drama film directed by Vijaygiri Bava. It stars Raunaq Kamdar, Dharmendra Gohil, Darshan Pandya, Chetan Dhanani, Shraddha Dangar, Monal Gajjar and Firoz Irani in principal roles. It was released on 16 February 2024. and The film was officially released in Hindi language across India on 3 May 2024.

== Plot summary ==
Set during Alauddin Khilji's invasion of Gujarat, Dadu Barot, a local chief of Adipur village at foothill, leads a small band of warriors to protect the Palitana Jain temples on Shatrunjaya hill from pillage and destruction.

== Cast ==
Principal cast include:

- Raunaq Kamdar as Amar Barot
- Dharmendra Gohil as Dadu Barot
- Darshan Pandya as Alauddin Khilji
- Chetan Dhanani as Arjun
- Shraddha Dangar as Sujan
- Monal Gajjar as Roshan
- Firoz Irani as Visabha

== Production ==
The film is adapted from Vimalkumar Dhami's novel Amar Balidan. It is produced at the cost of approximately ₹15 crore (US$1.6 million). A set spread over an area of 16 acres (6.5 ha) was created for the shooting.

== Soundtrack ==
All music is composed by Mehul Surti.

== Marketing and release ==
The teaser was released on 23 December 2023. The film was released on 16 February 2024.

The Hindi dubbed version of the film was released on 3 May 2024.

== Reception ==
Kanksha Vasavada writing for The Times of India rated it 4.5 out of 5. She praised the direction, music, screenplay and performances. Rachana Joshi of Mid-Day Gujarati rated it 4 out of 5. She praised the performances, casting, VFX, cinematography, soundtrack and dialogues but criticised the slow start and the length of the film. Meena Kansagara of TV9 Gujarati rated it 4.5 out of 5. She praised the direction, dialogues, script, action and music. Chtansingh Chauhan of Newzdaddy rated it 4 out of 5. He praised story, direction, performances, cinematography and score but criticised length, some long scenes and "lack of energy" in title song.
