= Chabutro (film) =

2022 Indian Gujarati film

- Official poster
- Directed by: Chanakya Patel
- Written by: Chanakya Patel
- Produced by: Neha Rajora
- Starring: Raunaq Kamdar; Anjali Barot
- Cinematography: Dhirendra Shukla
- Music by: Siddharth Amit Bhavsar
- Production company: White Elephant Films
- Distributed by: Panorama Studios
- Release date: 4 November 2022
- Running time: 119 minutes
- Country: India
- Language: Gujarati

Chabutro (transl. Dovecote) is a 2022 Gujarati-language film, directed by Chanakya Patel starring Raunaq Kamdar, Anjali Barot, and others produced by Neha Rajora and distributed by Panorama Studios.

== Plot ==
Viraj is living his dream life in the US but is forced to move back to Ahmedabad due to visa issues. During this time, he meets Nivedita, an architecture student, who is completely opposite to him. Now, Viraj must make a choice. Will he choose to go back or stay here?

== Cast ==
- Raunaq Kamdar
- Anjali Barot
- Dharmesh Vyas
- Chhaya Vora
- Annapurna Shukla
- Bhumika Barot
- Shivam Parekh
- Akash Pandya

== Development ==
The film has been shot in Ahmedabad, India, along with the city of Chicago, incidentally making it the first Gujarati film shot in Chicago. The first look of the poster revels on 15 September 2022. and announce the project and begun the promotion of the film. The teaser of the film was released on 19 September 2022. And before the festival of Navratri the most iconic Garba (dance) song Moti Veraana released. Raunaq Kamdar and Anjali Barot started the ground promotion of the film during the Navratri season. The trailer was released on 11 October 2022, and crossed more than a millions views receiving tremendous response from the audience. The music has been acquired by Shemaroo Entertainment.

== Soundtrack ==
Chabutro

Studio album by Siddharth Amit Bhavsar, Aditya Gadhvi, Madhubanti Bagchi, Raghav Kaushik, Aariz Saiyed
- Released: 23 September 2022
- Genre: Feature film soundtrack
- Label: Shemaroo Entertainment

=== Tracklist ===
The soundtrack of the album is composed by Siddharth Amit Bhavsar with lyrics written by Niren Bhatt. The soundtrack album consists of four tracks.

No.	Title	Lyrics	Music	Singer(s)	Length
1.	"Vairagi Re"	Niren Bhatt	Siddharth Amit Bhavsar	Madhubanti Bagchi & Siddharth Amit Bhavsar	4:01
2.	"Pardesi Malak"	Niren Bhatt	Siddharth Amit Bhavsar	Aditya Gadhvi & Siddharth Amit Bhavsar	4:06
3.	"Chabutro"	Niren Bhatt	Siddharth Amit Bhavsar	Aariz Saiyed & Siddharth Amit Bhavsar	4:02
4.	"He Ji Re"	Niren Bhatt	Siddharth Amit Bhavsar	Raghav Kaushik	2:15
