= Je Pan Kahish E Sachuj Kahish =

- Directed by: Naitik Raval
- Written by: Naitik Raval
- Starring: Gaurav Paswala; Sneha Devganiya; Shriya Tiwari; Chirag Trivedi
- Music by: Mehul Surti
- Release date: 14 October 2016
- Running time: 104 mins
- Country: India
- Language: Gujarati

Je Pan Kahish E Sachuj Kahish is a 2016 Gujarati thriller film starring Gaurav Paswala and Sneha Devganiya. The film is directed by Naitik Raval. It is the debut film of lead actor Gaurav Paswala as well as the writer-director Naitik Raval.

== Cast ==
- Gaurav Paswala as Dhaval
- Sneha Devganiya as Leeza
- Shriya Tiwari as Maaya
- Chirag Trivedi as Hawaldar

== Soundtrack ==
Je Pan Kahish E Sachuj Kahish

Soundtrack album by Mehul Surti
- Released: October 5, 2016
- Length: 6:04
- Language: Gujarati
- Label: Krup Music

The songs of the film are composed by Mehul Surti. Lyrics are penned by Raeesh Maniar.

Tracklist
No.	Title	Lyrics	Singer(s)	Length
1.	"Je Pan Kahish E Sachuj Kahish"	Raeesh Maniar	Siddharth Bhavsar	02:20
2.	"Tare Aaje Marvaa Nu Chhe"	Raeesh Maniar	Aishwarya Majmudar	03:44

== Release ==
The film was released on 14 October 2016.

== Reception ==
Je Pan Kahish E Sachuj Kahish received positive reviews from the audience; The Times of India user ratings gave 3.1/5 stars. On IMDB, the movie got 8.3/10 based on 46 user ratings. It received a user rating of 6.1/10 on the BookMyShow site. The movie was included in the best 5 recommended thriller suspense films by the Times of India.

== Awards ==
=== 2016 Gujarati Iconic Film Awards ===
The film won six awards.

- Best Background Music – Mehul Surti
- Best Screenplay- Naitik Raval, Akshay Paniker
- Best Actress – Sneha Devganiya
- Best Editor – Naitik Raval
- Best Remarkable Film of the Year – Jury Award – Rohan Shah
- Critics' Choice for the best film
