= Ittaa Kittaa =

2024 Indian Gujarati film by Abhinn Sharma and Manthan Purohit

- Theatrical release poster
- Directed by: Abhinn Sharma; Manthan Purohit
- Written by: Antima Pawar; Azhar Saiyed
- Produced by: Pankaj Keshruwala; Chandni Soni; Vikas Agrawal
- Starring: Manasi Parekh; Raunaq Kamdar; Alpana Buch
- Cinematography: Tapan Vyas
- Music by: Kedar-Bhargav
- Production companies: Janvi Productions; Gayatri Productions
- Distributed by: Rupam Entertainment Pvt Ltd
- Release date: 19 January 2024
- Running time: 123 minutes
- Country: India
- Language: Gujarati

Ittaa Kittaa is a 2024 Gujarati family drama film, directed by Abhinn Sharma and Manthan Purohit and written by Antima Pawar and Azhar Saiyed. It stars Manasi Parekh and Raunaq Kamdar. The film was produced by Pankaj Keshruwala, Chandni Soni, and Vikas Agarwal.

== Cast ==
- Manasi Parekh
- Raunaq Kamdar
- Alpana Buch
- Jia Vaidya
- Princy Prajapati
- Prashant Barot

== Production ==
The film was shot across various parts of Gujarat. The film's music of the film was composed and arranged by Kedar-Bhargav with lyrics by Bhargav Purohit and Kirtidan Gadhvi. Aishwarya Majumdar and Jigardan Gadhavi have given their voices to the film.

== Reception ==
Kanksha Vasavada of The Times of India rated it 4 out of 5. She praised the concept, story, direction, music and performances. Chetansingh Chauhan of NewzDaddy rated it 3.5 out of 5. He praised the performances and direction but criticised a predictable story, the pace and a lack of "comic punches". Virat Verma of FlickOnClick rated it 3.5 out of 5 and liked script, direction and performances. Rachna Joshi of Mid-Day Gujarati praised the concept and reviewed it positively.

== See also ==
- List of Gujarati films of 2024
