= Romance Complicated =

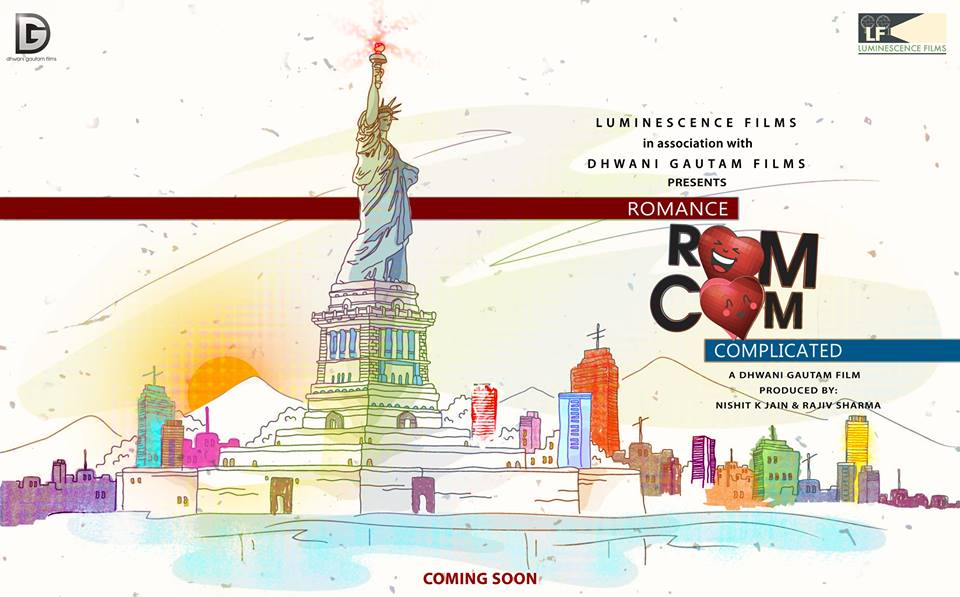
- Official Poster
- Directed by: Dhwani Gautam
- Written by: Dhwani Gautam; Vipul Sharma
- Produced by: Kirti Premraaj Jain; Rajiv Sharma
- Starring: Malhar Pandya; Divya Misra; Dharmesh Vyas; Shekhar Shukla; Darshan Jariwala; Nisha Kalamdani; Umang Acharya; Yulia Yanina; Dhwani Gautam
- Cinematography: Prashant Gohel
- Edited by: Harkirat Singh Lal
- Music by: Jatin-Pratik & Darshan Raval (Playback Singer)
- Production companies: Luminescence Films (In Association with); Dhwani Gautam Films
- Release date: 15 January 2016
- Country: India
- Language: Gujarati

Romance Complicated is a 2016 Indian Gujarati language romantic comedy film directed by Dhwani Gautam and produced by Kirti Premraaj Jain, Nishit Jain & Rajiv Sharma. It stars Malhar Pandya and Divya Misra make their debut as leads in this Gujarati film.

== Cast ==
- Malhar Pandya as Dev Patel
- Divya Misra as Maahi Patel
- Dharmesh Vyas as Dhiraj Patel
- Shekhar Shukla as Karsan Patel
- Darshan Jariwala as Tiku Mamaji
- Nisha Kalamdani as Aashima
- Umang Acharya as Aaditya
- Nirmit Vaishnav as Sandeep Patel
- Riddhi Raval Parikh as Aarti Patel
- Shweta Dhasmana as Shweta Patel
- Harish Daghiya as Paresh
- Maulik Nayak as Pappu
- Aishwaria Dussane as Anushka Joshi
- Nilofer Khalid as Preeti Patel
- Yulia Yanina as Elvira
- Dhwani Gautam as Aarsh Malhotra
- Avani Modi as Pooja Sharma

== Production ==
=== Development ===
The film is produced by Luminescence Films. Written by Dhwani Gautam. Jatin- Pratik and Darshan Raval (Playback Singer) are the music directors for this film. Romance Complicated ropes in big Bollywood singers such as Sonu Nigam, Shreya Ghoshal, Neeraj Shridhar, Javed Ali, Aishwarya Majmudar, Darshan Raval and Priya Patidar have sung songs for this movie. Neeti Mohan and Rashid Ali have rendered their voices to the title track of the movie.

=== Filming ===
Shooting of the film started in post September 2014. The shooting is said to set in some parts of Ahmedabad and Gandhinagar in India, and New York City and Jacksonville, Florida in the United States.

=== Casting ===
Debutants Malhar Pandya and Divya Misra have signed this movie playing the role of Dev Patel and Maahi Patel. Dharmesh Vyas, Darshan Jariwala and Shekhar Shukla are in a supporting role.

=== Music ===
The soundtrack of the album is composed by Jatin-Pratik & Darshan Raval with lyrics written by Chandresh Kanadia, Darshan Raval, Dashrath Mewal, Dhwani Gautam, Isha Gautam, Jigar Dave, Nilay Patel and Shailabh Sharma. The soundtrack album consists of seven tracks.

== Release ==
The film released on 15 January 2016 in 163 theatres and 591 shows.

== Soundtrack ==
Romance Complicated

Soundtrack album by Jatin Pratik & Darshan Raval
- Released: 2015
- Genre: Feature film soundtrack
- Language: Gujarati

Jatin-Pratik has composed the music of this film and Darshan Raval as Additional Composer. Lyrics of the tracks are written by Dashrath Mewal, Darshan Raval, Jigar Dave, Isha Gautam, Chandresh Kanadia, Nilay Patel and Dhwani Gautam.

Tracklist
No.	Title	Lyrics	Artist(s)	Length
1.	"RomCom Title Track"	Dashrath Mewal, Jigar Dave, Chandresh Kanadia, Dhwani Gautam	Rashid Ali & Neeti Mohan	3:47
2.	"Ishq Rang"	Dashrath Mewal	Sonu Nigam & Aishwarya Majmudar	5.36
3.	"Maahi"	Dashrath Mewal	Shreya Ghoshal	3.57
4.	"All in One Gujarati"	Isha Gautam & Dasharath Mewal	Niraj Shridhar & Priya Patidar	3:33
5.	"Pehla Varsad"	Darshan Raval	Darshan Raval	3:40
6.	"Tu ne Hoon"	Darshan Raval	Darshan Raval	3:11
7.	"Thumko Dilli No"	Dashrath Mewal	Javed Ali & Aishwarya Majmudar	3:15
Total length:				25:39
