= The Asian School =

Independent boarding school in Uttarakhand, India

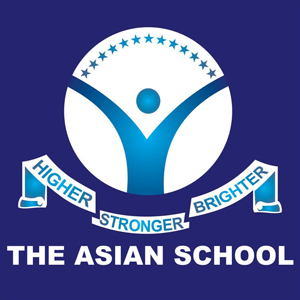

Location
- Asian Acres, Vasant Vihar, Indira Nagar; Dehradun- 248006, Uttarakhand; India; 30.3225598°N 78.0064419°E

Information
- Type: Independent, Boarding School
- Established: 2000
- Founder: Amarjeet Juneja
- Status: Open
- School board: Central Board of Secondary Education
- Grades: Nursery to 12th
- Classes: English, Hindi, Mathematics, Computers
- Language: English
- Schedule: 9 am - 3 pm
- Campus size: 15 acres
- Sports: Swimming, Cricket, Badminton, Hockey, Volleyball, Football, Tennis, Gymnastics
- Alumni: asianites
- Website: www.theasianschool.net

The Asian School, is a co-ed Boarding School in Dehradun with both Day Boarding and Full Boarding Facilities. The school was established in the year 2000 by Mr. Madanjeet Singh Juneja under the umbrella of the Asian Educational Charitable Trust.

== Affiliation ==
The School is affiliated with Central Board of Secondary Education (CBSE) and since 2000.

== Academics ==
The Asian School offers English medium, co-ed education from classes Nursery to XII Class.

== Sports ==
The School has sport facilities like two large playing fields, basketball, tennis, badminton courts, a 25-meter swimming pool and a gymnasium. Sports include Athletics, Badminton, Basketball, Baseball, Boxing, Cricket, Cross Country, Gymnastics, Hockey, Horse Riding, Karate, Soccer, Swimming, Table Tennis, Skating and Shooting.

== Notable alumni ==
- Rohan Trivedi B Tech Computer Engineering Data Science
