= Milind Gadhavi =

Gujarati poet (born 1985)

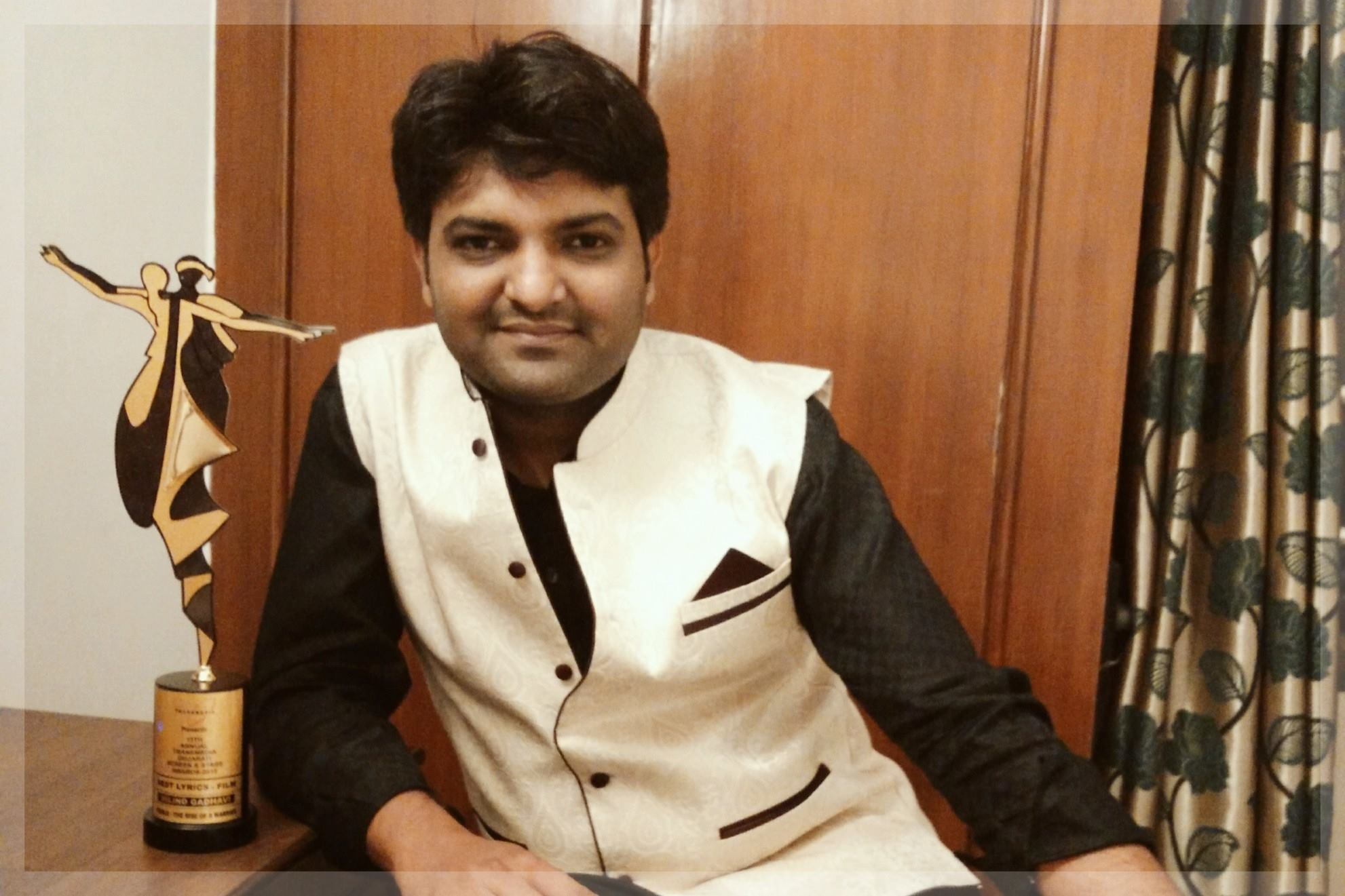
- Milind Gadhavi At 15th Transmedia award, Mumbai on 27 February 2016
- Born: Milind Bharatkumar Gadhavi; 1 May 1985 (age 41); Datrana, Mendarda, Junagadh
- Education: Saurashtra University (B.C.); M.S. University (M.B.A.)
- Occupations: poet, lyricist
- Writing career
- Language: Gujarati
- Years active: 2005 - present
- Genres: ghazal, geet, free verse, triolet, villanelle
- Notable awards: 15th Transmedia Award

Signature
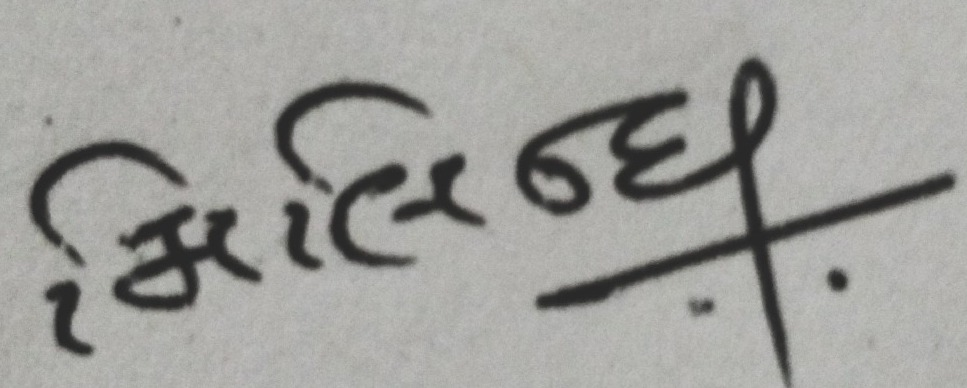

Milind Gadhavi (b. 1 May 1985) is a Gujarati language poet and lyricist from Gujarat, India. He has penned songs for several Gujarati movies. He is a recipient of the 15th Transmedia award for best lyrics for Gujarati film, Premji: Rise of a Warrior.

== Early life ==
Gadhavi was born in Datrana, a village in Mendarda taluka of Junagadh district to Bharatkumar Gadhavi and Chandanbahen Gadhavi. He was educated in schools and institutions including Roopayatan, Good Samaritan English Medium High School (Amreli), Gurukul (Savarkundla), Carmel Convent High School (Junagadh), St. Xavier's High School (Jamnagar), St. Mary's School (Porbandar), Swami Vivekanand Vinay Mandir (Junagadh). He completed his Bachelor of Commerce in 2009 from Saurashtra University and M.B.A. in 2011 from the Faculty of Management Studies, M.S. University, Vadodara.

He wrote his first poem in 6th standard at the age of 11, and wrote his first ghazal in 8th standard. In 12th standard, he learned the metres of ghazal and ventured in metrical form.

== Career ==
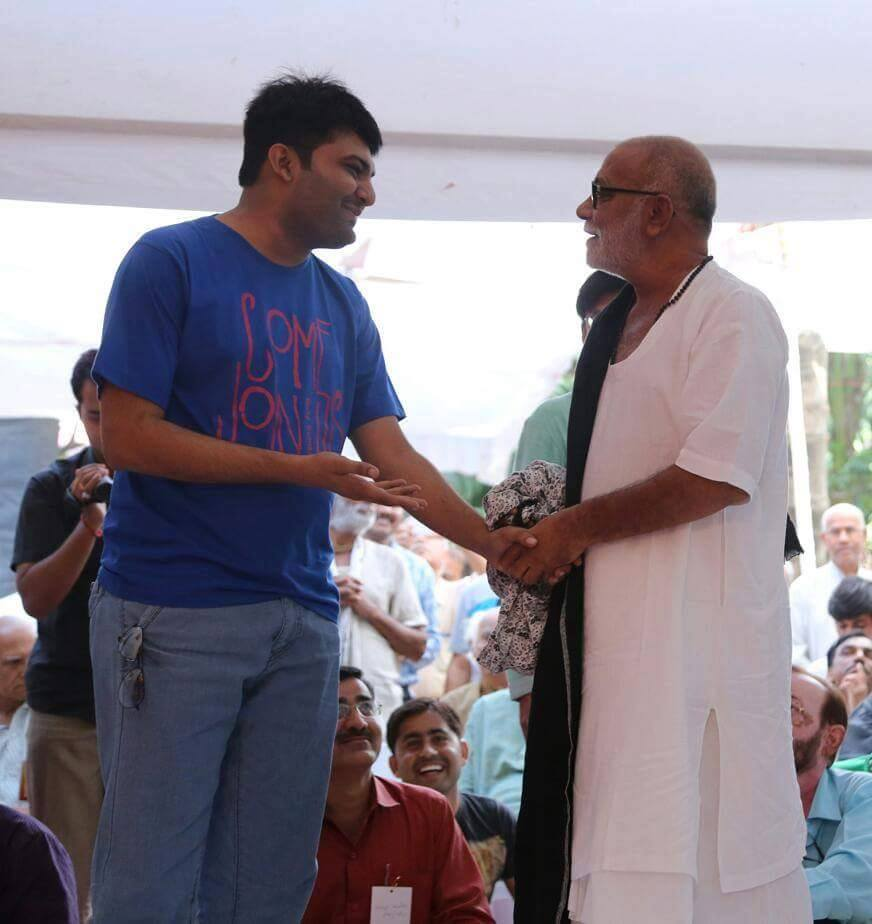
Milind Gadhavi with Morari Bapu at Asmita Parva, Mahuva in April 2015

Gadhavi is an Assistant Manager at Saurashtra Gramin Bank, Junagadh since 2013. His poems have been published in many eminent Gujarati literary magazines including Shabdasrishti, Gazalvishwa, Dhabak, Kumar, Kavita, Navneet Samarpan, Uddesh, Akhand Anand, Shabdalay and Tamanna. He has recited his poems at Doordarshan, Akashvani, Asmitaparva and other places of Gujarat. In July 2015, he recited his poems in Maanas Dharmrath Mushayra at Nyeri, Kenya.

== Works ==
Although Gadhavi has written in many different genres of poetry including ghazal, nazm, geet, sonnet, free verse, muktak, tripadi, anjani, triolet and villanelle, his main contribution is ghazal. The tender feelings of a young lover's heart and the disappointment from a lover's absence are the two sides of his ghazals. He penned 1 song, "Me to sooraj ne ropyo chhe aangne", for the Gujarati movie Premji: Rise of a Warrior and started his career as a lyricist. He has penned two songs for the film Thai Jashe! (both sung by Parthiv Gohil) and two songs for the film "I Wish". He has also written songs for the films Commitment and O! Taareee.

== Filmography ==
Movie	Release date	Songs
Premji: Rise of a Warrior	10 July 2015	Me to sooraj ne
Thai Jashe!	3 June 2016	Aasmani, Thai Jashe Title
Commitment	4 November 2016	Parioni Varta
O! Taareee	11 November 2016	Gulabi, Dosti
I Wish	2016	Tu jo rahe, Ajnabee savaar

== Awards ==
Gadhavi won the 15th Transmedia award for best lyrics in film Premji: Rise of a Warrior.

== See also ==
- List of Gujarati-language writers
