= Thai Jashe! =

- Official Poster
- Directed by: Nirav Barot
- Written by: Nirav Barot; Jay Bhatt; Prayag Dave
- Screenplay by: Nirav Barot; Jay Bhatt
- Produced by: Ajay Patel
- Starring: Manoj Joshi; Malhar Thakar; Monal Gajjar
- Cinematography: Tapan Vyas
- Edited by: Nirav Panchal
- Music by: Mihir Bhatt
- Release date: 3 June 2016
- Running time: 155 minutes
- Country: India
- Language: Gujarati
- Budget: ₹2.25 crore (US$230,000)
- Box office: ₹4 crore (US$420,000)

Thai Jashe! (English: Will Be Done!) is a 2016 Indian Gujarati film written and directed by Nirav Barot. It is about the struggles of a middle class man to achieve his goals in the metrocity Ahmedabad. The film stars Manoj Joshi, Malhar Thakar, and Monal Gajjar. The film was released on 3 June 2016.

== Plot ==
Pranav Joshi (Malhar Thakar) works as an industrial designer in Ahmedabad. When his father's dyeing factory in Jetpur goes bankrupt, his parents are forced to move with him in Ahmedabad. When they are insulted by his land lady, Pranav decides he has had enough and decides to buy his own house in the city.

Pranav and his fiancée Kajal (Monal Gajjar) finalize a house, but the house owner backs out after the deal is finalized. Pranav resumes his search and finds a house, which is above his budget, but decides to buy it nonetheless. Pranav and Kajal decide to get married so they can avail higher loan as the joint applicants. Pranav manages rest of the amount from friends and his boss, but the bank refuses to approve the loan at the last moment because he works for a proprietary firm. Pranav delivers an impassioned speech and walks out of the bank. In the fortunate turn of events, because of a client work he had done, his firm secures an international client and now it's a private limited firm and Pranav is eligible for the loan again.

The film ends with Pranav, Kajal, and his parents moving into the new house.

== Cast ==
- Malhar Thakar as Pranav Joshi
- Monal Gajjar as Kajal Bhatt
- Manoj Joshi as Chandrakantbhai Joshi
- Kumkum Das as Sarojben Joshi
- Hemang Dave as Deepak Dua
- Maulik Chauhan as Ram
- Sharad Vyas as Boss
- Bhavini Jani as Shanti Aunty
- Jay Bhatt as Pravinbhai
- Parth Raval as Himanshu Shah
- Viral Rachh as Govindbhai
- Atul Patel as Mr. Trivedi
- Subhash Brahmbhatt as Harkantbhai
- Dipti Brahmbhatt as Leelaben

== Production ==
=== Development ===
The film was shot in Ahmedabad and Jetpur under the production of Kore Films LLP.

=== Casting ===
The theatre artist and Bollywood actor Manoj Joshi was roped in for the role of protagonist’s father. The role of protagonist is played by Malhar Thakar who last appeared in acclaimed film, Chhello Divas. The lead female role is played by Monal Gajjar.

== Soundtrack ==
Thai Jashe!

Soundtrack album by Hemang Dholakia
- Released: 10 May 2016
- Genre: Feature film soundtrack
- Length: 22:15
- Language: Gujarati
- Label: Krup Music
- Producer: Kore Films

On the event of a music and poster launch of this movie, which was held in Cambey Hotel, Ahmedabad on 10 May 2016, the following soundtrack launched.

All music is composed by Hemang Dholakia.

Track list
No.	Title	Lyrics	Singer(s)	Length
1.	"Aasmani"	Milind Gadhavi	Parthiv Gohil	04:17
2.	"Doudo Doudo"	Jay Bhatt	RJ Dhvanit	03:24
3.	"Thai Jashe"	Milind Gadhavi	Parthiv Gohil	05:57
4.	"Thai Jashe" (Version 2)	Milind Gadhavi	Hemang Dholakia	05:57
5.	"Thai Jashe" (Reprise)	Jay Bhatt	Hemang Dholakia	02:40
Total length:				22:15

== Release ==
The trailer of the film was released on 15 May 2016. The film released on 3 June 2016 in 150 theatres and 350 screens across Gujarat and Maharashtra. The film's copy submitted for certification was leaked online and the makers filed a case with the cyber crime cell.

== Reception ==
=== Box office ===
The film grossed ₹4 crore (US$420,000) in the first four weeks.

=== Critical reception ===
Abhishek Jain praised the all facets of the film and recommended it. DeshGujarat praised the performances, but criticized the story line. BuddyBits rated it with 4/5 stars and said Thai Jashe is a must take ride into the life of a middle-class family.

== Awards ==
=== 16th Annual Transmedia Gujarati Screen & Stage awards ===
The film received nine nominations, including best film, best story and best director and won four awards.

- Best film
- Best Writer – Nirav Barot & Jay Bhatt
- Best actor – Malhar Thakar
- Best actress in supporting role – KumKum Das

=== 2016 Gujarati Iconic Film Awards ===
The film received eleven nominations, including best film, best story and best director and won three awards.

- Story of the Year- Nirav Barot & Jay Bhatt
- Best Supporting Actor – Manoj Joshi
- Best Supporting Actress – Bhavini Jani
