= Hellaro =

2019 Indian Gujarati period film

- Official poster
- Directed by: Abhishek Shah
- Screenplay by: Abhishek Shah; Prateek Gupta; Saumya Joshi (Dialogues and lyrics)
- Story by: Abhishek Shah
- Produced by: Ashish Patel; Nirav Patel; Aayush Patel; Abhishek Shah; Mit Jani; Prateek Gupta
- Starring: Jayesh More; Shraddha Dangar; Kaushambi Bhatt; Brinda Trivedi; Shachi Joshi; Niilam Paanchal; Tejal Panchasara; Kishan Gadhavi
- Cinematography: Tribhuvan Babu Sadineni
- Edited by: Prateek Gupta
- Music by: Mehul Surti
- Production company: Harfanmaula Films
- Release date: 8 November 2019
- Running time: 121 minutes
- Country: India
- Language: Gujarati
- Box office: ₹16 crore

Hellaro (transl. The Outburst) is a 2019 Indian Gujarati period drama film co-written and directed by Abhishek Shah and produced by Ashish Patel, Nirav Patel, Aayush Patel, Prateek Gupta, Mit Jani and Abhishek Shah under the banner of Saarthi Productions and Harfanmaula films. The film having ensemble cast of Jayesh More, Shraddha Dangar, Brinda Trivedi Nayak, Shachi Joshi, Niilam Paanchal, Tejal Panchasara and Kausambi Bhatt, marks the directorial debut of Abhishek Shah. The film revolves around a group of women living in the Rann of Kutch in the 1970s.

Hellaro won the National Film Award for Best Feature Film at the 66th National Film Awards. It was officially selected as the opening film at Indian Panorama, at 50th International Film Festival of India (IFFI). It was also nominated for the best debut feature film of a director at the film festival. The film was released in theatres in India on 8 November 2019 to positive reviews.

== Synopsis ==
In 1975, a young girl named Manjhri is married off to a small village in the middle of nowhere in the Rann of Kutch. There has been no rain in the village for many years. The villagers believe it is a curse of the goddess because of a widow rup who was an embroider and tried to earn money and escaped with another villager. As an apology the men present a Gujarati folkdance garba to impress the goddess, but the women are not allowed to play garba. Every morning the women of the village go to a distant lake to fetch water, this is the only time when they are not suppressed but free. One day they come across an unconscious drummer and help him. In return, he plays his dhol and the women play garba for the first time. Since then, every day they fetch water and play garba. After some time the women convince him to ask the mukhya of their village for shelter and play dhol for navrati. Every day he plays garba for the women at the day and for the men at night. One day the women are caught playing garba and are beaten as a punishment. On the same night the women play garba in the village and it rains.

== Cast ==
- Shraddha Dangar as Manjhri
- Jayesh More as Mulji, a drummer
- Tejal Panchasara as Gomti
- Shailesh Prajapati as Mukhi
- Maulik Nayak as Bhaglo
- Aarjav Trivedi as Arjan
- Brinda Trivedi as Kesar
- Tarjanee Bhadla as Gauri
- Niilam Paanchal as Leela
- Kaushambi Bhatt as Champa
- Swati Dave
- Denisha Ghumra as Radha
- Aakash Zala as Joraavar
- Rajan Thakar
- Kishan Gadhvi
- Kamlesh Parmar
- Sachi Joshi
- Riddhi Yadav as Kanchan
- Jagruti Thakore
- Dhriti Patel as Reva
- Kamini Panchal
- Ekta Bachwani
- Parva Bhatt

== Production ==
The debut director and co-writer Abhishek Shah stated that the story was inspired from folklore of the Vrajvani village in Kutch and real-life instances of patriarchy. Prateek Gupta co-wrote screenplay, edited, and co-produced the film while also serving as the Associate Director. Playwright and poet Saumya Joshi wrote lyrics, additional screenplay, and dialogues. Mehul Surti composed the music. Ashish Patel, Nirav Patel, Aayush Patel, Abhishek Shah, Mit Jani, and Prateek Gupta produced the film under the banner of Saarthi Productions and Harfanmaula films. Aayush Patel and Mit Jani helmed as creative and executive producers.

A set of village with fifteen Bhunga (traditional houses), a town square and a temple was created in Rann of Kutch near Kuran village where the film was shot.

== Soundtrack ==
Hellaro

Soundtrack album by Mehul Surti
- Released: 18 October 2019
- Recorded: 2018
- Genre: Feature film soundtrack
- Length: 18:44
- Language: Gujarati
- Label: Saarthi Productions LLP
External audio
- Official Audio Jukebox on YouTube

All lyrics are written by Saumya Joshi; all music is composed by Mehul Surti.

Track listing
No.	Title	Singer(s)	Length
1.	"Asvaar"	Aishwarya Majmudar, Mooralala Marwada	4:03
2.	"Haiyaa"	Shruti Pathak, Aditya Gadhvi (Backing vocals)	5:01
3.	"Sapna Vinani Raat"	Aditya Gadhvi	5:30
4.	"Vaagyo Re Dhol"	Bhoomi Trivedi	4:10
Total length:			18:44

== Release ==
It was released in theatres on 8 November 2019.

Hellaro was selected as the opening film at the Indian Panorama during the 50th International Film Festival of India (IFFI), held in November 2019 in Goa, where it won a special mention from jury for its "incredible music, colour and choreography." It is also nominated for the best debut feature film of a director at the film festival.

The film was released on MX Player on 4 April 2020.

== Reception ==
=== Critical response ===
The film received universal acclaim from critics. Abhimanyu Joshi of The Times of India rated it 4 out of 5. He praised the film's direction, story, screenplay, acting, cinematography, music, and choreography, further stating that the film justly deserves the National Award it received and fulfills expectations. Namrata Joshi writing for The Hindu praised the story, direction, production, and cinematography. She further added that the film "questions patriarchy while celebrating the colours and culture of Gujarat". Jigar Ganatra of Mumbai Live called it "masterpiece" and rated 4.5 out of 5. Parsi Times rated it 3.5 out of 5. Delnaz Divecha writing for BookMyShow noted that the film's presentation of the subjects of patriarchy, casteism, and superstition connects the audience, and further praised the film's performances and choreography. She also pointed that "some customs may seem outdated but still happen to be the reality of many rural women". Jinal Bhatt of Mashable India rated it 4.5 out of 5.

Ramesh Tanna of Kutchmitra praised the film for its direction, acting, and cinematography, calling it a "must-watch" but criticised the false subject of opposition to garba and embroidery work, some characterisations, and the lack of Kutchi language in a film set in Kutch. He also questioned the relevance of the film's subject in contemporary times and pointed to the inaccurate representation of Kutch's local culture and the 1970s.

=== Box office ===
The film had grossed over ₹15 crore (US$1.6 million) in the box office. The film had grossed over $1,41,304 (₹1 crore) in overseas market.

=== Controversy ===
A police complaint under Atrocities Act was filed against the film's producer, director, and writer for use of term Harijan in the film's dialogue. According to the complaint Jamnaben Vegda, the term is considered derogatory by the Scheduled Caste people.

== Accolades ==
Hellaro won the National Film Award for Best Feature Film at the 66th National Film Awards. The thirteen female actresses also won the Special Jury Award for their performances. It was the first Gujarati film to win the National Film Award for Best Feature Film.

Award	Category	Recipient(s) and nominee(s)	Result
66th National Film Awards	Best Feature Film	Producer: Saarthi Productions LLP Director: Abhishek Shah	Won
66th National Film Awards	Special Jury Award	Shraddha Dangar, Shachi Joshi, Denisha Ghumra, Neelam Paanchal, Tarjanee Bhadla, Brinda Nayak, Tejal Panchasara, Kaushambi Bhatt, Ekta Bachwani, Kamini Panchal, Jagruti Thakore, Riddhi Yadav, and Prapti Mehta	Won
50th International Film Festival of India	Special Mention	Hellaro	Won

== See also ==
- List of Gujarati films of 2019
- List of highest-grossing Gujarati films
