= Raunaq Kamdar =

Indian actor

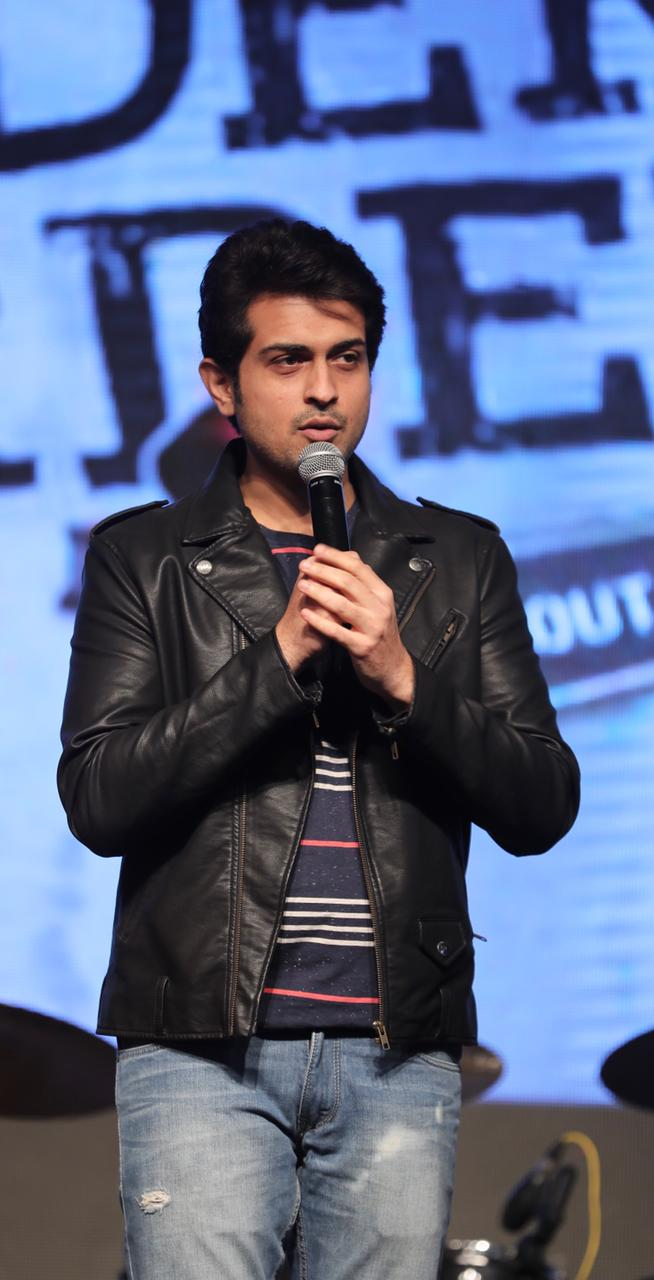
- Kamdar at the trailer launch of Order Order Out of Order in 2019 at Ahmedabad
- Born: 1986 (age 39–40); Mumbai, India
- Education: CEPT University, Ahmedabad
- Occupation: Actor
- Years active: 2001 - present

Raunaq Kamdar (born 1986) is an Indian actor known for his work in Gujarati cinema and Gujarati theatre.

== Early life ==
Born in 1986 at Mumbai, Kamdar completed his schooling at St. Xavier’s High School, Ahmedabad, and studied architecture at CEPT University, Ahmedabad.

== Career ==
He started his acting career in theatre in 2001 and directed several plays including Frigyes Karinthy's The Refund. The plays which he produced include Ismat Apa ke Naam, Katha Collage, Pune Highway, Class of 64, and The Interview. He started his film career with the 2016 Gujarati film Hu Tu Tu Tu – Aavi Ramat Ni Rutu (2016), and later played lead role in Tuu to Gayo (2016), Family Circus (2018), Have Thase Baap Re (2019), Order Order Out of Order (2019). He appeared in Ekvismu Tiffin (2021) directed by Vijaygiri Bava. He was praised for his role in Naadi Dosh (2022). He acted in Chabutro (2022).

== Filmography ==
Key
†	Denotes films that have not yet been released

Year	Film	Role	Ref.
2016	Hutututu: Aavi Ramat Ni Rutu	Guru Valjibhai	
2016	Tuu to Gayo	Sumit	
2018	Family Circus	Ronak	
2019	Have Thase Baap Re	Aadarsh	
2019	Order Order Out of Order	Yash Thaker	
2019	Teacher Of The Year	Anchor	
2021	21mu Tiffin	Dhruv	
2022	Naadi Dosh	Kunal	
2022	Chabutro	Viraj	
2023	Lakiro	Hrishi	
2023	Hurry Om Hurry	Om	
2024	Ittaa Kittaa	Nirav	
2024	Kasoombo	Amar	
2024	Builder Boys	Viraj	
2025	Misri	Arjun	
2026	Asambhauuu	Chintan	

=== Web ===
- Chaskela (on OHO Gujarati)
- Happy Family: Conditions Apply as Sanjuoy Dholakia

== Theatre ==
He has played major role in several plays:

Year	Play	Role
2001	The Verdict	Sir William Rollander
2002	The Apollo of Bellac	The secretary
2003	Just One More Time	Raymond
2004	Grey	Grey
2005	2B	God
2005	Waiting for Godot	Vladimir
2009	The Perspectives on the Cross	The Centurion
2011	Dakhla Tarike	Raunaq
2012	Shukdaan	Indrajeet

== Recognition ==
Kamdar was featured on The Times 50 Most Desirable Men of India 2019. He was named as Gujarat's "Most Desirable Man of 2019" by Ahmedabad Times.
