= Raam Mori =

Indian author and screenwriter (born 1993)

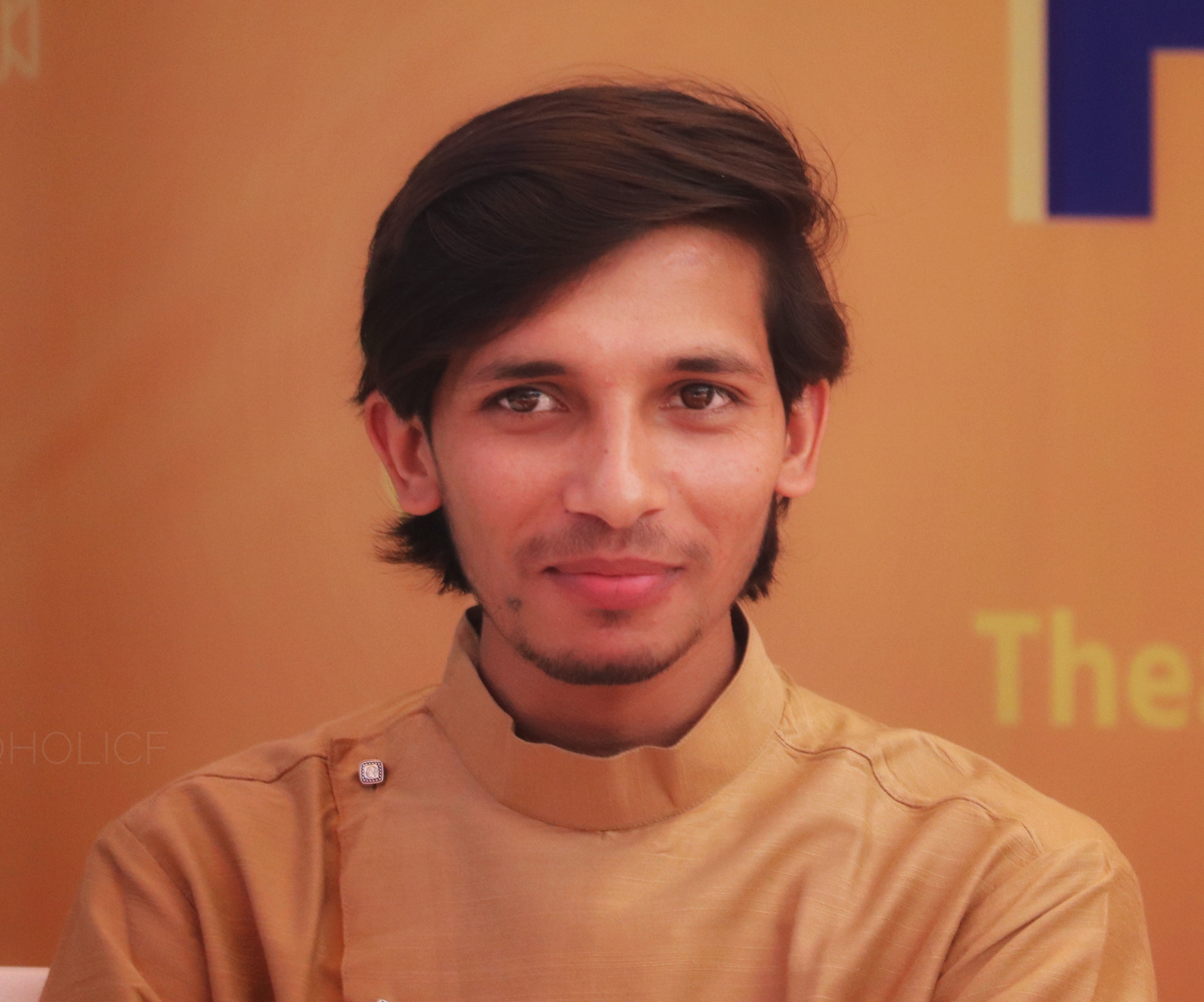
- at Gujarat Literature Festival Vadodara; January 2019
- Born: Raam Bhavsangbhai Mori; 2 February 1993 (age 33); Mota Surka, Sihor, Bhavnagar district, Gujarat, India
- Education: Fabrication Engineering
- Occupations: Short story writer, Novelist, Screenwriter, Columnist
- Writing career
- Language: Gujarati
- Genres: Short story, Novel, Screenplay
- Notable works: Mahotu, Satyabhama, Kasoombo, 21mu Tiffin
- Notable awards: Yuva Puraskar (2017)
- Website: raammori.com

Raam Mori (born 2 February 1993) is a Gujarati language short story writer, novelist, screenwriter, and columnist from Gujarat, India. He is known for his stories depicting the rural life of Saurashtra, particularly focusing on female protagonists. His debut short story collection, Mahotu, earned him the Sahitya Akademi's Yuva Puraskar in 2017. He has also gained significant recognition as a screenwriter in Gujarati cinema.

== Early life ==
Raam Mori was born on 2 February 1993 in Mota Surka, a village in Sihor taluka of Bhavnagar district, Gujarat, to Tejalba and Bhavsangbhai Mori. His family is originally from Lakhavad village near Palitana. He completed his studies in fabrication engineering.

He began writing short stories at the age of 17. His work has since been published in prominent Gujarati literary magazines, including Shabdasrishti, Navneet Samarpan, Etad, and Tathapi. He currently resides in Ahmedabad.

== Career ==
=== Literary Works ===
In 2016, Mori published his debut short story collection, Mahotu, which was critically acclaimed by writers like Raghuveer Chaudhary and Kirit Doodhat. The collection focuses on the lives of women in rural Saurashtra. This was followed by Coffee Stories (2018), a collection of micro-fiction, and Confession Box (2020), a collection of letter stories.

In 2025, he published his debut novel, Satyabhama, a mythological narrative centered on the character of Satyabhama, one of Krishna's queens. His second novel, Barima Aakhu Aakash, which explores the relationship between a lesbian daughter and her father, was published in 2026.

=== Journalism and Academia ===
Mori has worked with media outlets such as TV9 (Gujarati) and Colors Gujarati. He has authored several popular columns, including "Mukam Varta" in Divya Bhaskar, "The Confession Box" in Mumbai Samachar, "Love You Zindagi" for Cocktail Zindagi magazine, and "#We" in Phulchhab.

He serves as a visiting faculty member at institutions like the National Institute of Mass Communication and Journalism (NIMCJ), St. Xavier's College in Ahmedabad, Gujarat University, and Navjivan Journalism College. He is also a Professor of Practice at Gujarat Vidyapith.

=== Screenwriting ===
Mori made his debut in Gujarati cinema as the writer for Montu Ni Bittu (2019). He went on to write the screenplay and dialogues for several critically and commercially successful films, including 21mu Tiffin (2021), which received the National Film Award for Best Gujarati Film, Kutch Express (2023), and the historical drama Kasoombo (2024).

== Works ==
=== Books ===
- Mahotu (મહોતું) (2016) - Short Story Collection
- Coffee Stories (કૉફી સ્ટોરીઝ) (2018) - Micro-fiction Collection
- Confession Box (કન્ફેશન બોક્સ) (2020) - Letter Story Collection
- Satyabhama (સત્યભામા) (2025) - Novel
- Barima Aakhu Aakash (બારીમાં આખ્ખું આકાશ) (2026) - Novel

=== Filmography ===
Year	Film	Story	Screenplay	Dialogue	Notes
2019	Montu Ni Bittu	Yes	Yes	Yes	Debut film
2021	21mu Tiffin	Yes	Yes	Yes	National Award Winner
2021	Mara Pappa Superhero	Yes	Yes	Yes	
2023	Kutch Express	No	No	Yes	
2024	Kasoombo	Yes	Yes	Yes	
2025	Maharani	Yes	Yes	Yes	

== Recognition ==
- Yuva Puraskar (2017) – Awarded by Sahitya Akademi for Mahotu.
- Yuva Puraskar (2018) – Awarded by Bharatiya Bhasha Parishad.
- Nanabhai Jebalia Smriti Sahitya Puraskar (2017).
- Third Prize (2016) – Awarded by Gujarat Sahitya Akademi for Mahotu.
