= Premji: Rise of a Warrior =

- Official poster
- Directed by: Vijaygiri Bava
- Written by: Vijaygiri; Gireesh Parmar
- Screenplay by: Vijaygiri
- Produced by: Twinkle Vijaygiri
- Starring: Abhimanyu Singh; Happy Bhavsar; Mehul Solanki; Aarohi Patel; Malhar Pandya; Namrata Pathak; Maulik Nayak; Vishal umar
- Cinematography: Pruthvish Mistry; Nilesh Goswami; Pratik Raj
- Edited by: Chirag Vaishnav (Associate Editor : Parth Desai)
- Music by: Kedar Upadhyay–Bhargav Purohit
- Production company: Vijaygiri Films
- Release date: 10 July 2015
- Country: India
- Language: Gujarati

Premji: Rise of a Warrior is a new era Gujarati film directed by Vijaygiri Bava & produced by Twinkle Vijaygiri. It also stars the Hindi cinema actor, Abhimanyu Singh.

The film is about a boy named Premji (played by Mehul Solanki) who hails from a Kutchi village. He comes to Ahmedabad with a tragic past and he constantly struggles to know who he really is. In this journey, his soul mate, Pavan (played by Aarohi Patel), his mother (Happy Bhavsar) and his best friends Mukesh (Maulik Nayak), Chitra (Namrata Pathak) and Roy (Malhar Pandya) support him and join his fight against evil.

The film was released on 10 July 2015 in Gujarat and received much critical acclaim, especially due to its bold storyline, direction and performances. On 31 March 2017, the re-edited version of the film got released for the first time in Mumbai and re-released in Gujarat.

Premji : Rise of a Warrior received ten Gujarat State Awards for 2015, including Best Film, Best Director- Vijaygiri Bava, Best Actor- Mehul Solanki, Best Story-Screenplay.

== Cast ==
- Abhimanyu Singh as Meghji (Premji's father)
- Happy Bhavsar as Kuwar (Premji's mother)
- Mehul Solanki as Premji
- Aarohi Patel as Pavan
- Malhar Pandya as Roy
- Namrata Pathak as Chitra
- Maulik Nayak as Mukesh
- Vishal Vaishya as Raghnath Malan
- Thasvi Venkat as Dancer in Haay haay history song

== Production ==
=== Development ===
After directing various short films including the short film Amdavadi Mijaj, Director Vijaygiri is now debuting with Premji – Rise of A Warrior. The concept of a boy who is struggling with himself for his own identity clicked in the director's mind a long time ago and he gradually developed the story. Dialogues of the film are written by Gireesh Parmar and Vijaygiri. The cast includes veteran Gujarati theater artists like Happy Bhavsar, Maulik Nayak, Mehul Solanki, Namrata Pathak and Vishal Vaishya along with Hindi cinema actor Abhimanyu Singh.

=== Filming ===
The film is shot in Ahmedabad, Diu & Kutch. It was shot at more than 20 locations in 25 days. Talking about filming the locations, Vijaygiri said, "We have tried to cover the college life of Ahmedabad but the emphasis was given more to the Kutch locations as per the script's requirement. Also, we have tried to capture Diu the way you might have never seen before."

Music for the film is composed by Kedar Upadhyay–Bhargav Purohit. The duo is well known for composing music in various stage plays. Director Vijaygiri says, "Premji's music is completely theme based music. As the story will progress, you will be able to find lots of variation in music like Kutch folk song, ritual song etc."

== See also ==
- List of Gujarati films of 2015
