= Gunaah (TV series) =

- Promotional release poster
- Genre: Action; Drama; Thriller
- Created by: Anirudh Pathak
- Based on: Ezel
- Written by: Sweta Mishra
- Directed by: Anil Senior
- Starring: Gashmeer Mahajani; Surbhi Jyoti; Zayn Ibad Khan
- Country of origin: India
- Original language: Hindi
- No. of seasons: 2
- No. of episodes: 33

Production
- Producers: Sukesh Dev Motwani; Mautik Tolia; Persis Siganporia
- Cinematography: Pawan Gupta
- Camera setup: Multi-camera
- Running time: 23-32 minutes
- Production company: Bodhi Tree Multimedia Ltd

Original release
- Network: Disney+ Hotstar
- Release: 3 June 2024 – present

Gunaah (transl. Crime) is an Indian Hindi-language action drama television series directed by Anil Senior and written by Sweta Mishra. Produced under Bodhi Tree Multimedia Ltd, the series stars Gashmeer Mahajani, Surbhi Jyoti, Zayn Ibad Khan and Darshan Pandya. Season 1 aired from 3 June 2024 to 5 July 2024 on Disney+ Hotstar.

== Cast ==
- Gashmeer Mahajani as Abhimanyu.
- Surbhi Jyoti as Tara.
- Zayn Ibad Khan as Shiva.
- Darshan Pandya as Joki Karve (JK).
- Shailesh Datar as Fernandes Bhau.
- Shashank Ketkar as Micheal Mendonza.
- Shezray H. Mirza as Divya.
- Purva Parag as Gargi.
- Deepak Qazir as Eknath.
- Tanmay Nagar as Mert.

== Production ==
The series was announced on Disney+ Hotstar. It is an adaptation of Turkish series Ezel. The filming of the series concluded in 2024. The teaser of the series was released on 24 May 2024. Subsequently, the official trailer was released on 31 May 2024.

== Reception ==
Archika Khurana of The Times of India rated the series two-and-a-half out of five stars. Bhawna Arya for Times Now gave the series 3/5 stars.
