= Vijaygiri Bava =

Indian film maker and screenwriter

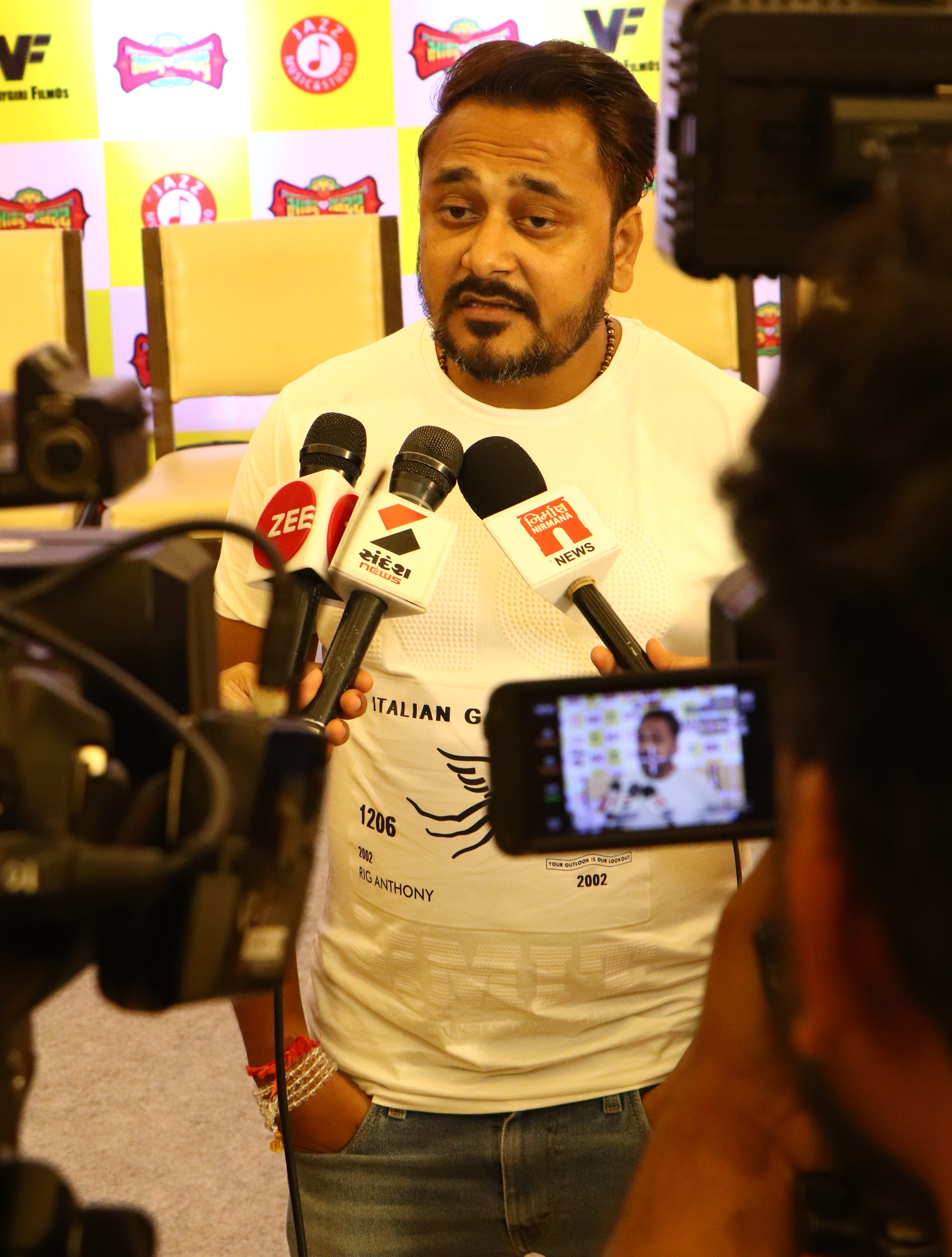
- Bava at the trailer launch of Montu Ni Bittu, July 2019
- Born: 24 March 1987 (age 39); Chansol, Kheralu, Gujarat, India
- Occupations: Film director, screenwriter
- Known for: Premji: Rise of a Warrior (2015); Montu Ni Bittu (2019)
- Spouse: Twinkle Bava (m. 2011)
- Website: Official website

Vijaygiri Bava (born 24 March 1987) is an Indian filmmaker and screenwriter who primarily works in Gujarati cinema.

== Career ==
He made his debut as a director in the film Premji: Rise of a Warrior (2015), for which he received the State Film Award in the best film category.

His second film Montu Ni Bittu (transl. Montu's Bittu), starring Maulik Nayak and Aarohi Patel and written by Raam Mori, was released in 2019. Its story follows a love triangle between the two title characters Montu and Bittu. His next film, 21mu Tiffin, starring Netri Trivedi, Niilam Paanchal and Raunaq Kamdar, was released in 2021. He produces films under his banner Vijaygiri Filmos.

Bava has directed a short film Mahotu (transl. a filthy rag) written by Raam Mori.

== Personal life ==
Bava completed his schooling at his native place Kheralu. He received his Bachelor of Arts in 2007 degree from L. D. Arts College, Ahmedabad. He married Twinkle Bava in 2011, and they have a daughter.

== Filmography ==
Films
Year	Title	Director	Writer	Notes
2015	Premji: Rise of a Warrior	Yes	Yes	
2018	Mahotu	Yes	Yes	Short film
2019	Montu Ni Bittu	Yes	No	
2024	Kasoombo	Yes	Yes	

Television
Year	Title	Director	Writer	Notes
2021	Riverfront Stories	Yes	No	Episode: "Madhyahana na Zhanzhva"; Also producer

== Accolades ==
Bava's Premji: Rise of a Warrior won the State Film Award for best film category. Premji received 10 State Award for Films from the Gujarat government, and the Transmedia Screen and Stage Award. Bava received the Transmedia Screen and Stage Award for best dialogue category. He was awarded the Best Director Award at the 19th Transmedia Gujarati Screen and Stage Awards for Montu Ni Bittu. He also won the 2019 GIFA award for Best Director for Montu Ni Bittu.

=== GIFA -Gujarati Iconic Film Award ===
Year	Films	Category	Result
2019	Montu Ni Bittu (As director)	Best Director	Won
