= Ashwini Bhatt =

Gujarati writer

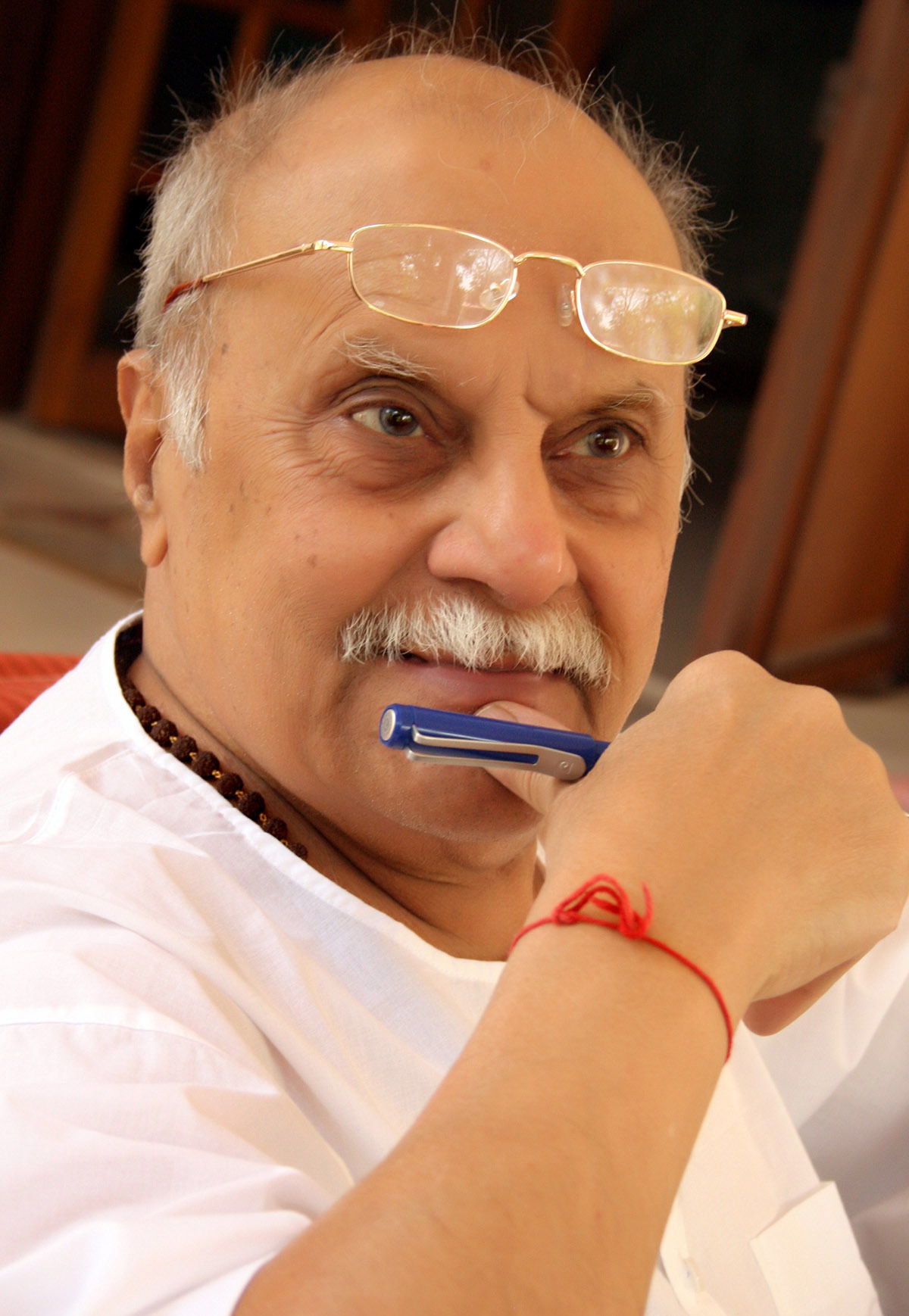
- Ashwini Bhatt at Ahmedabad, 2012
- Born: 12 July 1936; Ahmedabad, India
- Died: 10 December 2012 (aged 76); Dallas, Texas, United States
- Occupations: Novelist, actor and activist
- Spouse: Neeti Bhatt
- Children: Neel Bhatt
- Writing career
- Language: Gujarati
- Genre: Thriller
- Notable works: Othaar; Faanslo; Aashka Maandal; Katibandh; Nirja Bhargav; Angaar; Aakhet

Ashwini Bhatt (1936 – 2012) was a Gujarati language novelist.

== Life ==
He was born to educationist Harprasad Bhatt and Sharadaben Bhatt on 12 July 1936 in Ahmedabad. He graduated in psychology. He was interested in theatre and he worked as a child artist in Gujarati adoption of Bengali drama Bindur Chhele (Bindu No Kiko). He had failed in several business ventures like poultry farm to a vegetable vendor before starting career as a writer. He moved to United States in 2002. He died on 10 December 2012 at Dallas, Texas, US.

== Works ==
Bhatt wrote twelve novels and three novellas.

His serialized novels include Othaar, Faanslo, Aashka Maandal, Katibandh, Nirja Bhargav, Lajja Sanyal, Shailja Sagar, Aayno, Angaar, Jalkapat and Aakhet. Besides writing novels, he was also involved in theatre. His Katibandh was made into TV series. His novellas include Kasab, Karamat and Kamthan.

He translated several works in Gujarati including Alistair MacLean and James Hadley Chase. He also translated Freedom at Midnight by Collins and Lapierre in Gujarati as Ardhi Rate Azadi which was critically acclaimed.

Akrosh Ane Akanksha is his essay collection.

He was also involved in Narmada Bachao Andolan.
