= Dhvanit Thaker =

Indian radio personality

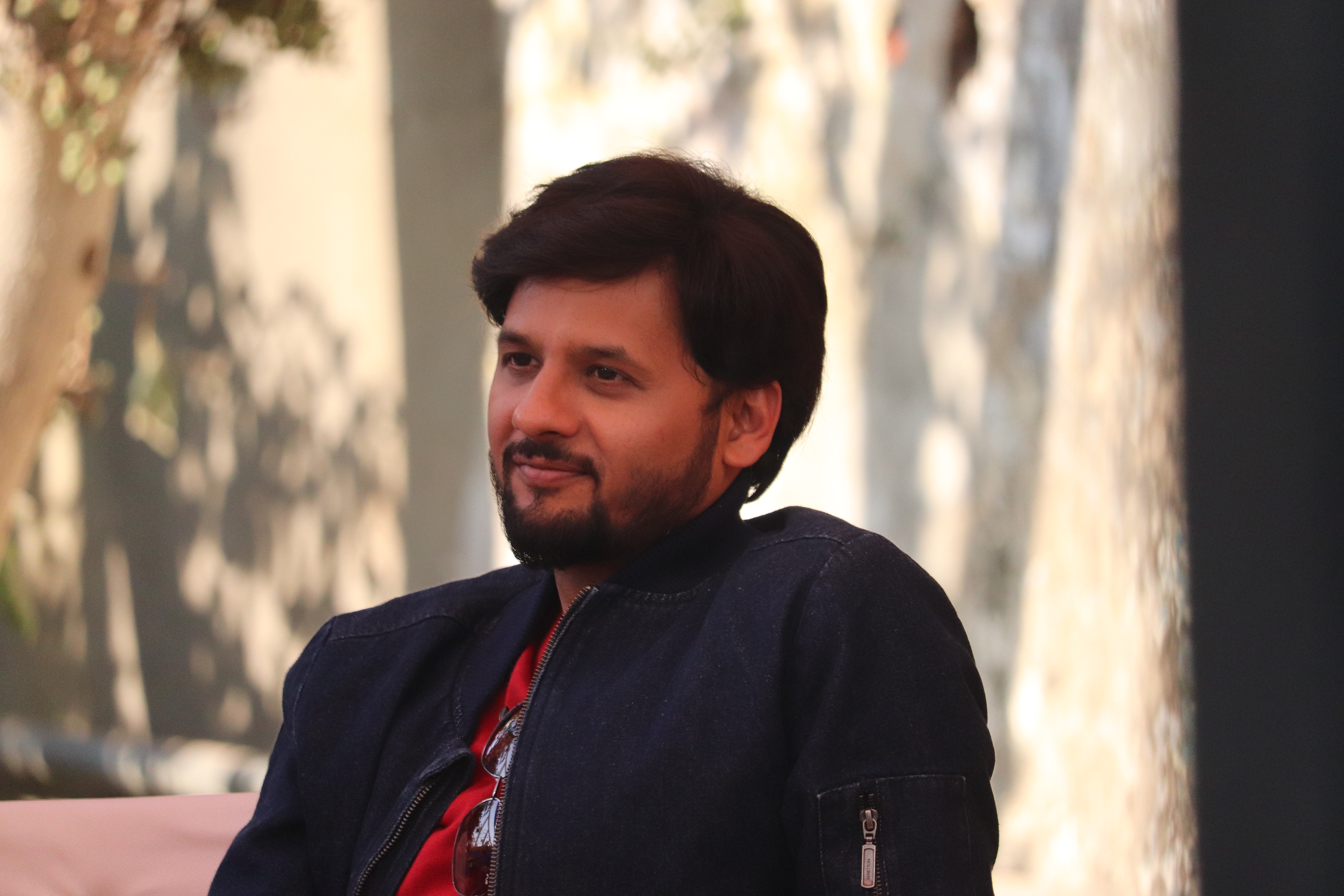
- Dhvanit At Gujarat Literature Festival Vadodara In 2019
- Born: April 8 Ahmedabad, Gujarat, India
- Education: Sheth Chimanlal Nagindas Vidyalaya; M. G. Science College
- Occupations: Actor, singer, radio personality
- Years active: 2003-Present
- Spouse: Aesha
- RJ Dhvanit's voice in Gujarati Dhvanit telling a story in an interview which changed his life
- Website: Official website

Dhvanit Thaker is Gujarati actor and singer from Ahmedabad, Gujarat, India. He formerly worked as a radio personality from 2003 to 2021.

== Early life ==
Dhvanit was born in Ahmedabad to Neeta and Harishkumar Thaker. He completed his schooling from Sheth Chimanlal Nagindas Vidyalaya in Ahmedabad. He completed B. Sc. in Chemistry from M. G. Science College, Ahmedabad. He joined M. Sc. but dropped out as his father died and he took over his job in Life Insurance Corporation of India where he worked for three years. He participated in the first ever talent hunt by Radio Mirchi in 2003. He won the hunt against 1500 participants and joined as the radio presenter even though he did not have any formal training in it.

== Career ==
Dhvanit Thaker hosted the morning and evening shows on Radio Mirchi Ahmedabad. He had produced radio jingles. He released his first music album, Majja ni Life, in 2009, which was successful. He also performed single for 2013 Gujarati album, Click Kar!. He has also sung for several Gujarati films like Kevi Rite Jaish, Better Half, Mohan Na Monkiz, Passport and Montu ni Bittu (2019). He wrote a column Dhvanit Sab Janta Hai in Ahmedabad Mirror and Just Dhvanit in NavGujarat Samay. He also made documentaries for the Government of Gujarat. He published a book of quotes in Gujarati, Morning Mantra in 2017.

Dhvanit debuted as an actor in 2017 Gujarati film Vitamin She, directed by Faisal Hashmi which was well received and was commercially successful. Before that, he performed a cameo as a teacher in Gujarati film Mission Mummy (2016). Dhvanit again collaborated with Faisal Hashmi for the first Gujarati science fiction film Short Circuit, which was released in January 2019.

After working for 18 years with Radio Mirchi, he left his career as a radio host on 5 November 2021. His Gujarati comedy drama film Petipack released in April 2022.

== Awards ==
He has won the Best Radio Jockey (Gujarati) and the Best Show (Guruwar Gurjari and Hello Amdavad) in the India Radio Forum Awards for 2009, 2010 and 2015.

== Personal life ==
Dhvanit Thaker has married Aesha and has two daughters, Krishnavi and Jayasvi.

== Filmography ==
Year	Movie	Role	Director	Notes
2016	Mission Mummy	Himself	Ashish Kakkad	Cameo
2017	Vitamin She	Jigar	Faisal Hashmi	
2019	Short Circuit	Samay	Faisal Hashmi	
2022	Petipack	Abhimanyu	K. R. Devmani	
2022	Gajab Thai Gayo!			Voice
2025	Malik Ni Varta		K. R. Devmani	
