= Amit Shah (disambiguation) =

Amit Shah (born 1964) is an Indian politician and cabinet minister in the Government of India.

Amit Shah may also refer to:

- Amit Shah (actor) (born 1981), British actor
- Amit Shah (mayor), Indian politician, mayor of Ahmedabad
- Amit Shah and the March of BJP, a biography of Amit Shah
