= Vasavada =

Vasavada is an Indian surname. Notable people with the surname include:

- Abhay R Vasavada (fl. 1984–2010), Indian ophthalmologist
- Arpit Vasavada, (born 1988), Indian cricketer
- Dhairav Vasavada, (born 1995), Indian Neurosurgeon
- Jay Vasavada (born 1973), Indian writer
