= Colour of Life =

Colour of Life or Color of Life may refer to:

- Color of Life, a 2006 single and song by Misia
- The Color of Life, a 2001 Japanese film spin-off of the TV program Vermilion Pleasure Night
- Meghdhanushya: The Colour of Life, a 2013 Indian LGBT film
