= Gujarat Literature Festival =

Literary festival in Gujarat, India

Gujarat Literature Festival ગુજરાતી સાહિત્ય મહોત્સવ
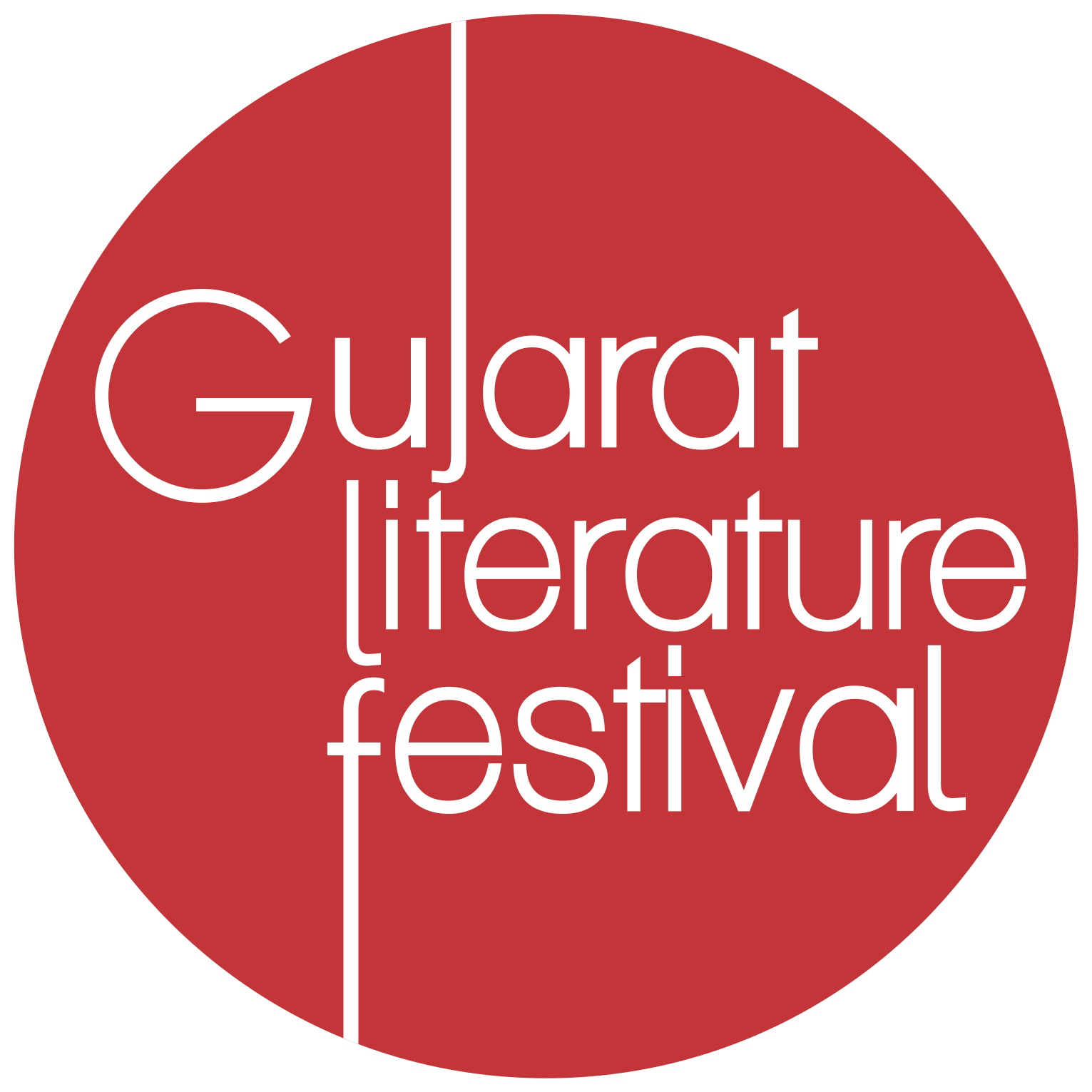
- Status: active
- Genre: Literary festival
- Frequency: Annually
- Locations: Ahmedabad, Vadodara
- Country: India
- Years active: 12
- Inaugurated: January 3, 2014
- Founders: Shyam Parekh; Samkit Shah; Jumana Shah
- Most recent: December 22, 2019
- Participants: 200
- People: Paras Jha; Abhishek Jain; Raam Mori; Rajendra Patel
- Member: Aditi Desai, Niharika Shah, Rj Devaki, RJ Aarti, Bhargav Purohit.
- Sponsors: Tourism Corporation of Gujarat Ltd; Reliance Group; Oil and Natural Gas Corporation; Hindustan Coca Cola Beverages Pvt. Ltd.; Gujarat State Handloom & Handicraft Corporation; Vodafone; Alembic Pharmaceuticals
- Website: gujlitfest.com

The Gujarat Literature Festival (abbreviated as GLF), also known as Gujarati Sahitya Mahotsav, is a literary festival which takes place annually in the Indian city Ahmedabad, Gujarat, generally in December–January.

The main aim of the festival is to promote and popularize Gujarati literature through the method of debates, discussions, and workshops. The festival was founded by Shyam Parekh, Samkit Shah, and Jumana Shah. Other members of the festival include Paras Jha, filmmaker Abhishek Jain, writer Raam Mori, and poet Rajendra Patel. Started with philosophy that literature is not bound between the covers of book, GLF brings together multiple forms of narratives including theatre, screenplay, documentary films, music, journalism, social media, and oral tradition.

== Overview ==
The Gujarat Literature Festival is the first literary festival and one of the largest literary events in Gujarat. It is also known as Gujarati Sahitya Mahotsav. The main aim of the festival is to promote and popularize Gujarati literature through the method of debates, discussions, and workshops. Officially a three-days event, it also includes two days of pre-inauguration events such as workshops and competition. Started with philosophy that literature is not bound between the covers of book, GLF brings together multiple forms of narratives including theatre, screenplay, documentary films, music, journalism, social media, and oral tradition.

Shyam Parekh and Samkit Shah are the directors and producers of the festival, while Paras Jha serves as the programming director. Poet Rajendra Patel and filmmaker Abhishek Jain is the member of the festival. Other team members include Aditi Desai, Niharka Shah, Bhargav Purohit, RJ Aarti And RJ Devaki .

GLF is sponsored by the Tourism Corporation of Gujarat Ltd (TCGL); Oil and Natural Gas Corporation (ONGC); Hindustan Coca Cola Beverages Pvt. Ltd. (HCCB) and Gujarat State Handloom & Handicraft Corporation (GSHHDC). The Gujarat University and the Amdavad Municipal Corporation function as the partner of the festival.

== Timeline ==
=== First edition ===
The first edition of the GLF was held on 3, 4, and 5 January 2014. It was sponsored by Vodafone.

=== Second edition ===
The second edition of GLF was launched in 2015. The festival was held at Kanoria Centre, Ahmedabad from 28 to 31 January and 1 February. A workshop and a debate were arranged on the first two days about film critique. It had about 40 sessions, featuring about 125 speakers.

=== Third edition ===
The third edition of the festival was launched in 2015, from 8 January to 10 January. The main theme of this edition was "films as the new literature". It had about 50 sessions, featuring more than 100 speakers. Some of the notable speakers include economist Lord Meghnad Desai, Malayalam poet K. Satchidanandan, film director Sriram Raghavan, scriptwriter Varun Grover and Anjum Rajabali.

=== Fourth edition ===
The GLF launched its fourth edition in 2016. The festival was inaugurated by Om Prakash Kohli, former governor of Gujarat. The event was held 5 days from 14 to 18 December at Kanoria Centre, Ahmedabad. It had sessions in Gujarati, Hindi, and in Urdu languages. The event had about 10 workshops and 80 sessions. The festival invited around 200 speakers, including Ritesh Shah, Juhi Chaturvedi, Jay Vasavada.

=== Fifth edition ===
The fifth edition of the festival was released in 2018 at Kanoria Centre, Hutheesing Gallery, and Gujarat University for 5 days: 3 to 7 January. It also launched the Children Literature Festival under its umbrella. This edition arranged workshops on subjects ranging from television writing to storytelling, and staged various plays.

GLF Award was launched in the recognition of excellence in writing books, films, digital, editing, translation, designing, proofreading.

=== Sixth edition ===
The sixth edition was released in 2018 for the first time in Vadodara. It was held at Alembic Premises, Vadodara for 3 days: 2 to 4 February, featuring 75 sessions. It was sponsored by the Alembic Pharmaceuticals Ltd.

=== Seventh edition ===
The seventh edition of the festival was held again at Vadodara from 18 to 20, January 2019, which locally came to known as Alembic Gujarat Literature Festival. Along with the regular events, it launched for the first time 'Indian Screenwriting Festival', inviting a number of writers, lyricists, directors from Bollywood. The festival also launched 'Fountainhead' for non-Gujarati languages, featuring sessions in Hindi, English and Marathi languages.

Some of the notable speakers were Bhavani Iyer, Sriram Raghavan, Ishita Moitra, Hardik Mehta, Anjum Rajabali, Pushpesh Pant, Rajdeep Sardesai, Divya Prakash Dubey, Sagarika Ghose, and Kanishk Seth. Some of the Gujarati speakers were Madhu Rye, Saumya Joshi, Jay Vasavada, Kaajal Oza Vaidya, Dhruv Bhatt, and Raam Mori.

=== Eighth edition ===
GLF launched its eight edition in 2019 for five days; 18 December to 22 December. The festival was held at Gujarat University campus, and had six simultaneous events under its umbrella including an Indian Screenwriters' Festival, BizLitFest, ArtFest, Tabariya (for children), Gujarati Sahitya Mahotsav, Fountainhead (non-Gujarati literature sessions), and a food festival, in addition to eight workshops. It featured about 200 speakers with 100 sessions. In this edition, GLF launched Kanti Bhatt Memorial Award in the memory of Gujarati writer and journalist Kanti Bhatt. The festival had a book market in the campus of Gujarat University.

Some of the notable speakers were screenwriters Robin Bhatt, Anjum Rajabali and V. Vijayendra Prasad; filmmaker Vishal Bhardwaj, music duo Sachin–Jigar and Shyamal-Saumil Munshi, architect B. V. Doshi, author Abid Surti, Ashish Vashi, Mahendrasinh Parmar and Sunil Alagh.

=== Ninth Edition ===
After the 2 years break due to COVID-19, GLF Launched its ninth edition a 5-day event at Ahmedabad Management Association on 11 to 15 May 2022. This edition of GLF featured five distinct festivals — Gujarati Sahitya Mahotsav, Indian Screenwriters’ Festival, Tabariya, Business Literature Festival, and Fountainhead.

== See also ==
- List of literary festivals in India
