= Asit Vora =

Indian politician

Mayor of Ahmedabad Municipal Corporation
- In office 31 October 2010 – 30 April 2013
- Preceded by: Kanaji Thakor
- Succeeded by: Meenakshi Patel

Chairman of GSSSB
- In office 29 January 2014 – 8 February 2022
- Succeeded by: A. K. Rakesh (IAS)

Personal details
- Born: 4 August 1959 (age 66) Ahmedabad, India
- Party: Bhartiya Janata Party
- Spouse: Christian Wife
- Children: 1 Daughter Halak
- Profession: Politician

Asit Ravindraprasad Vora (born 4 August 1959) was 31st Mayor of Ahmedabad city in India. He is a Bhartiya Janata Party politician from Maninagar. He was a municipal councillor from Maninagar ward. And standing committee chairman in his previous term before becoming Mayor. He also serves as Senior Manager at Ahmedabad's Arvind Mills.

== Political career ==
He was elected for the first time from Maninagar ward as a Municipal Councilor in 1987. Then Jayendra Pandit became the first BJP Mayor in Gujarat. Since he was elected for the first time, he has held various positions in different terms. He was first elected in 1987 when BJP came to power in AMC first time in history and Brahmin Jayendra Pandit became the first BJP Mayor in Gujarat. Vora is Brahmin and after Jayendra Pandit he is the first male Brahmin Mayor of Ahmedabad. He was also appointed as chairman of Gujarat Subordinate Service Selection Board(GSSSB) on 29 January 2014. He resigned from the post on 8 February 2022.

== See also ==
- Ahmedabad Municipal Corporation
- Bharatiya Janata Party
