= Shyamal-Saumil =

- Origin: Ahmedabad, Gujarat, India.
- Genres: Classical Indian; pop
- Years active: 1980–present
- Label: Wonder Waves
- Members: Saumil Munshi; Shyamal Munshi; Aarti Munshi
- Website: shyamalsaumil.com

Shyamal-Saumil is an Indian classical music duo formed in 1980 in Ahmedabad, Gujarat, India, composed of the Gujarati singers, Shyamal Munshi and Saumil Munshi.

== History ==
Saumil Munshi was born on September 5, 1960, and Shyamal Munshi was born on April 14, 1962, in Ahmedabad, India. Their passion for music and literature started at a young age through their school activities. The two participated in performances and competitions, reciting ghazals and poems. In 1973, they joined the Jagh Mag Mandal, where they performed a variety of music, from film songs to classical poetry.

In 1980, the duo gave their debut a solo performance, titled "Morpichch", a sold-out show. The shows were repeated in Kolkata and Mumbai, and over the course of the first 5 years, they gave 20 shows in 3 cities.

Shyamal-Saumil, in late 2000, launched "Swarsetu", a listeners forum, to promote "Sugam Sangeet" and "Kavya Sangeet".

In 2002, Shyamal-Saumil released a 6-album project called "Hastakshar", with each album containing songs by a different illustrious poet and lyricist. These poets were Tushar Shukla, Raman Patel, Ramesh Parekh, Suresh Dalal, and Umashankar Joshi, and for their songs, Shyamal-Saumil brought together 30 artists to create the project. The title song was sung by Jagjit Singh and other singers, which included Kavita Krishnamurthy, Shankar Mahadevan, Udit Narayan, Sadhana Sargam, Bhupendar Singh, and Shubha Joshi. Shreya Goshal sang her first Gujarati song on the album's track, "Aaj Maaru Mann".

=== 2005–present ===
In 2012, Swarsetu News Digest was launched by Shyamal-Saumil, a monthly magazine.

Aapnu Amdavad Surilu Amdavad was a 2011 project released to celebrate the heritage of the city of Ahmedabad. The music video features the then-Mayor of Ahmedabad, Asit Vora, and Indian cricketer, Parthiv Patel. It featured songs dedicated to the festival of kites, Uttarayan, and to Manekchowk, a city square in Ahmedabad.

In 2014, Shyamal-Saumil organized a 3-day music festival called Anushthaan. The event featured musicians and artists from Gujarat. The Times of India called the event a "spectacle for music-lovers." In 2015 and 2016, the event was repeated. The events also included dance performances. Anushthaan also included several poets, stand-up comedians, and actors. In 2015, the event featured an LED floor, and in 2016, a cappella performance was presented.

== Filmography ==
- Bhale Padharya: Welcome to Gujarat (2011)
- Mission Mummy
- Hun Hunshi Hunshilal

== Discography ==
=== Studio albums ===
Shyamal-Saumil has produced a total of 21 albums. These albums follow distinct themes, and are thus split into 4 categories.

In the "Chanchal" category, the albums are typically for adolescents and young adults. Albums under this section include:

- Rangtaal (2005)
- Aapnun Amdavad Surilun Amdavad (2012)
- Aasneh (2014)

The "Sheetal" category of albums comprises ghazals. Albums under this section include:

- Aabshaar (2016)
- Mara Hissa No Suraj (2016)
- Meh Jharmar (2014)
- Swarsaavan (2014)
- Swarkavan (2013)
- Rajuat (2011)
- Morpichch (2005)
- Hastakshar (2002)

In the "Nirmal" category, it consists of devotional songs and songs of worship. Albums under this section include:

- Shiv Dhoon (2013)
- Shivmahim Stotram (2013)
- Bhavsarita (2006)
- Maha Mantra (2005)
- Dhoon (2002)
- Jin Vandana (2000)
- Jin Mangal (1998)

"Komal" sections are dedicated to children are often sung by children themselves. Albums under this section include:

- Tim Tim Taara (2014)
- Allak Mallak (2005)
- Meghdhanoosh (1999)

== Awards and nominations ==
- Gujarat State Gaurav Puraskar (2006–2007)
- Best Music Director (2011–2012): Bhale Padharya: Welcome to Gujarat
- Girnar Swarshiromani Puraskar (2012)
- Chaalo Gujarat: Award for Excellence (2012): Saumil Munshi
- JSAF Naari Shakti Award (2013): Aarti Munshi
- Arpan Patra for tour to Sydney (2015)
- Transmedia 11th Annual Gujarati Screen and Stage Awards (2011)
- Nishtha Patra for Anushthaan (2014)
- Trend-setter of the Year (2014) by Gujarati Innovation Society
- Power Hundred Eminent Personalities of Gujarat (Divya Bhaskar)
- Women of Substance: Aarti Munshi by Divya Bhaskar
