= Mahila Manch =

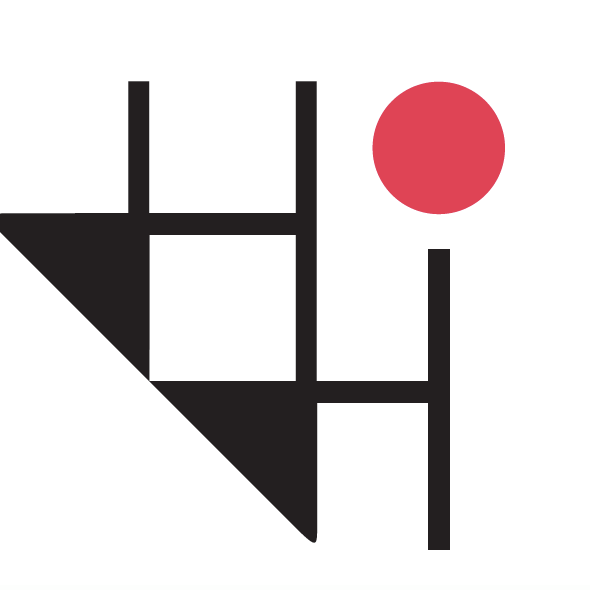
Logo of Mahila Manch

Mahila Manch is a women's stand-up comedy collective based in Ahmedabad, India founded by Shefali Pandy and Preeti Das. The duo and their friend Renu met in Ahmedabad and founded the collective in December 2017. Over the year, Mahila Manch could carve a space for women and other underrepresented groups to be heard and seen. The collective has gained popularity for engaging with contemporary issues in politics, gender, and identity.

== Shows and gigs ==
Mahila Manch has been organizing regular shows and gigs around women, sexual pleasure, body shaming, the question of caste, and the #Me-too story. The primary objective of the collective is to influence people’s ideas about gender, sexuality, identity, caste, and religion. Some of their prominent shows have been the following:

- The Period Show, a monthly show, highlights the LGBTQ, rape, #MeToo, female sexuality, and body shaming.
- Bevda Gujarat show brought the women bootleggers on stage to share their experiences in Gujarat, a dry state in India.
- Maa-Bahein show focused on patriarchy and sexism.
- Tu 13 Dekh show brought the Dalit community members on stage to share the challenges and disgrace of manual scavenging.
- Ek Thi Rani show was about the female protagonists who are often ignored in the popular narrative.
- Other performances and gigs include 'Acche Din, Acche jokes!' and 'Love, Sex and Dhokla.'

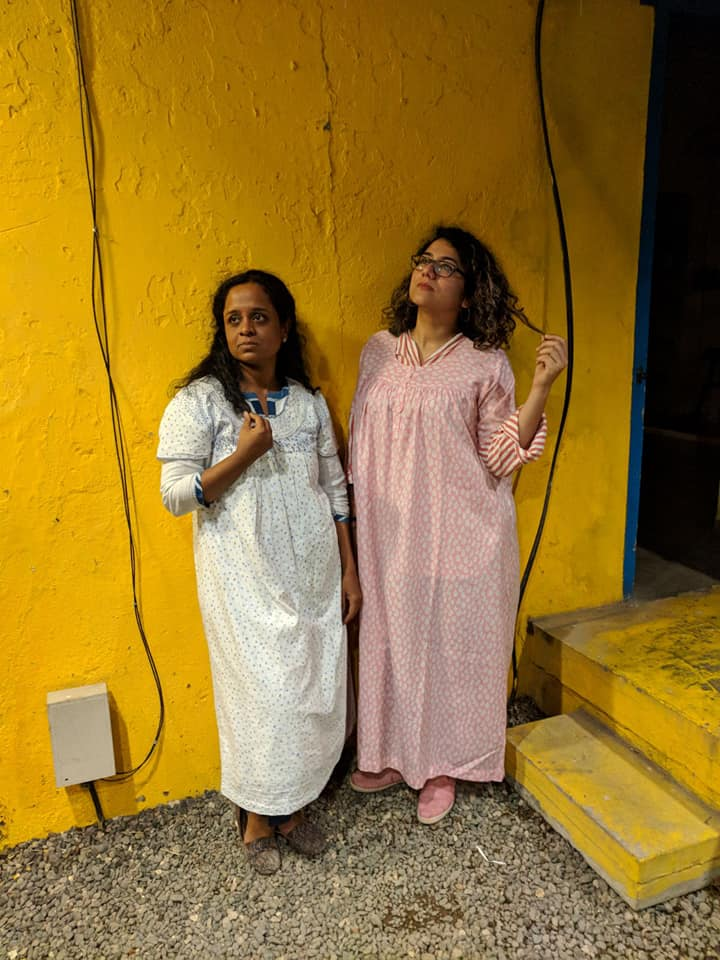
Preeti Das and Shefali Pandey

== Co-founders ==
Shefali Pandey has worked with major media houses in New York and Mumbai before co-founding Mahila Manch. She is also the founder of Flora Fountain, a digital agency based in Ahmedabad. Shefali holds an undergraduate degree in Engineering from Gujarat University and a Masters in Public Communications from Syracuse University. Preeti Das is Gujarat's first woman stand-up comic and is currently a visiting faculty at Ahmedabad University. She has worked as a journalist and researcher for several years before co-founding Mahila Manch.

== Reception ==
Originally started as the living rooms and cafes performances, Mahila Manch shows have gained pan India support since 2017. The collective has also been featured in Indian Women Blog, eShe, Scroll, Provoke, and India Today. They have been invited to perform at the One Billion Rising event in Delhi, the Gujarat Literature Festival, and Matrubhumi International Festival of Letters. Perturbed by the jokes about sexuality, Ahmedabad urban conservatives have been critical of Mahila Mach.
