= Rajendra Patel =

Indian Gujarati-language poet, short story writer and critic (Born: 1958)

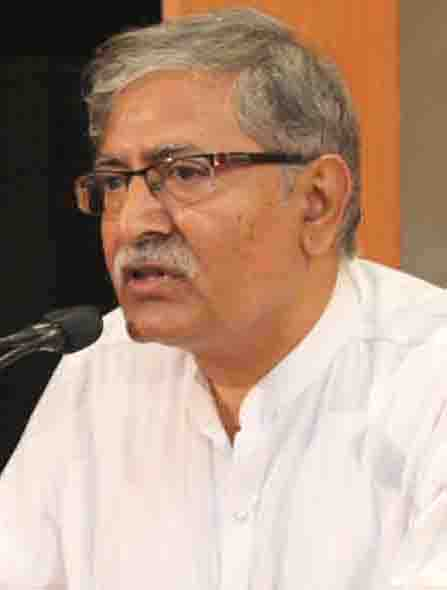
- Patel at Gujarat Vishwakosh Trust
- Born: Rajendra Bhogilal Patel; 20 August 1958 (age 68); Naroda, Ahmedabad, Gujarat
- Education: Master of Science
- Alma mater: Gujarat University
- Occupations: Poet, Short story writer, Critic, Translator
- Writing career
- Language: Gujarati
- Years active: 1974 - present
- Period: Post-modern Gujarati literature
- Genres: Free verse, Sonnet, Short story, Essay
- Notable works: Jueeni Sugandha (2003); Shri Purant Janse (2009)
- Notable awards: Best Book Prize of Gujarat Sahitya Akademi

Rajendra Patel (born 20 August 1958) is a Gujarati language poet, short story writer and critic from Gujarat, India. He has served as Vice President of Gujarati Sahitya Parishad since 2014. His significant works include Jueeni Sugandha (2003; collection of short stories), Shri Purant Janse (2009; collection of poems) and Avagat (2014; collection of criticism). Gujarat Sahitya Akademi awarded him three times for his poems, short stories and criticism. His book Jueeni Sugandh was translated by Navneet Thakkar in Hindi as Juhi Ki Mahak (2007). He also served in the editorial team of Shabdasrishti, a monthly magazine published by Gujarat Sahitya Akademi.

== Early life ==
Patel was born on 20 August 1958 in the Naroda area of Ahmedabad, Gujarat; to Bhogilal and Lakshmibahen. He took his schooling from Diwan Ballubhai School, which is near Kankaria, from 1968 to 1974. He received his Bachelor of Science from Bhavans College, Ahmedabad in 1978 in the Chemistry subject. He received his Master of Science in Organic Chemistry from the School of Science at Gujarat University in 1980.
He married in 1984 and has two daughters.

== Career ==
He started to write in 1974 and was published for first time in Vishwamanav, a Gujarati language magazine. Subsequently, his poems were published in other literary magazines including Parab, Kumar, Kavilok, Kavita, Etad and Navneet Samarpan.

He served as a treasurer of Gujarati Sahitya Parishad, Ahmedabad from 2006 to 2009; as a member of the Advisory Board of Gujarati language at Sahitya Akademi, New Delhi from 2009 to 2012; as a joint secretary of Vanche Gujarat Abhiyan, Gandhinagar from 2010 to 2011; as a secretary of Gujarati Sahitya Parishad from 2010 to 2013; and was serving as a Vice President of Gujarati Sahitya Parishad from 2014 to 2020. At present he is a trustee of Matrubhasha Abhiyan, Director of Anuvad Pratishthan and core team member of the Gujarat Literature Festival in Ahmedabad. He is also running a pharmaceutical company.

== Works ==
=== Poem collections ===
- Koshma Suryodaya (2004)
- Shree Purant Janse (2009)
- Kabutar, Patang ane Darpan (2012)
- Ek Shodhaparva (2013)
- Bapujini Chhatri (2014)
- Vastuparva (2016)
- Chandostav (2021)
- Vasiyatnamu (2021)

=== Short story collections ===
- Jueeni Sugandha (2003)
- Adhuri Shodh (2009)
- Akbandh Aakash (2011)

=== Essay Collection ===
- Baari Pase... (2021)

=== Literary criticism ===
- Avagahan (2010)
- Avagat (2014)
- Morito Chahi Na Ami (2015, Sri Aurobindo and Rabindranath Tagore's poetry).
- Videshi Kavyvishesh (2021)
- Ravindrasahitya Vishesh (2021)
- Pankhi na Jane (2021)
- Fal ane Falshruti (2021)

=== Editing ===
- Bhogilal Gandhi Janmashatabdi Grantha (2011; birth centenary volume on Bhogilal Gandhi)

== Recognition ==
He received prizes from Gujarat Sahitya Akademi for his short story collection Jueeni Sugandh in 2004, for his poetry collection Shree Purant Janse in 2009 and for his criticism book "Avagat" in 2014.

== See also ==
- List of Gujarati-language writers
