= Meghdhanushya — The Colour of Life =

- Directed by: K. R. Devmani
- Written by: Milan Devmani
- Produced by: Mahendrabhai patel
- Release date: 25 April 2013 (Gadhinagar)
- Country: India
- Language: Gujarati

Meghdhanushya — The Colour of Life (2013) is the first movie to positively feature the gay community in Indian Gujarati cinema. It is directed by K. R. Devmani and produced by Mahendra Bhai Patel, with narration by Manvendra Singh Gohil and Sylvester Merchant.

This film portrays how lesbians and gay men have a part in society, and shows their situations and conditions they experience. Gohil notes that even five years ago the film would have been received negatively, but now has received an "A" ("Adults Only") rating from the Censor Board of India.

Because of the subject matter the filmmaker has had to seek legal relief to get the same tax incentives of other films. They also faced censorship issues.

== Plot ==
In the film, three stages of life have been shown: childhood, youth, and adulthood. The protagonist is Tanmay, a gay man who during childhood adopts feminine behaviours, concerning his parents. They consult a doctor, and apply parental and social pressure to modify their son. During his youth, he is pressured to marry, and derided by his fellow college students as "special". Eventually, he is forced to leave his home.

The film then turns to later in his life, when Tanmay and Aniket adopt a child together, naming him "Shlok". The boy grows to become a successful businessman, but his gay parents keep their distance from him to avoid burdening him with social stigma. Shlok meets a woman, Disha, whom he wishes to marry, but his parents' homosexuality becomes an impediment.

The film accordingly shows the social obstacles against gay people in Indian society, in a format divided into three separate vignettes.

== Promotion ==
Mallika Sarabhai and Onir are also supporting this film for awareness.

== Stylistics ==
Instead of songs, Meghdhanushya film uses poetry to depict feelings in movie. Its poems are written by Milan Devmani and voiced-over by RJ Dhvanit (Radio Mirchi) and RJ Devki (Red FM).
