= Kinjal Rajpriya =

Indian actress (born 1989)

- Born: 23 September 1989 (age 37); Ahmedabad, Gujarat, India
- Occupation: Actress
- Years active: 2015–present

Kinjal Rajpriya (born 23 September 1989) is an Indian actress primarily working in the Gujarati film industry. She made her acting debut in the Gujarati film Chhello Divas in 2015. She is known for Kem Chho? (2020), 53 Mu Panu (2022), Nava Pappa (2023), and 3 Ekka (2023).

== Career ==
Rajpriya debuted in Gujarati cinema in 2015 with Chhello Divas directed by Krishnadev Yagnik which was declared hit. In 2016, she debuted in Bollywood with Days of Tafree, the Hindi remake of Gujarati film Chhello Divas. She later appeared in Shu Thayu? (2018), Saheb (2019) opposite Malhar Thakar, and Short Circuit (2019) a first ever Gujarati science fiction film based on the concept of time loop. In 2020, she won Gujarat State Awards 2020 for best actress for film Kem Chho?. In 2023, she appeared in Nava Pappa, Var Padharavo Saavdhan a first ever Gujarati film to dub in Kannada language, and 3 Ekka.

== Filmography ==
Key
†	Denotes films that have not yet been released

Year	Title	Role	Director	Language	Notes
2015	Chhello Divas	Nisha	Krishnadev Yagnik	Gujarati	Debut Film
2016	Days of Tafree	Nisha	Krishnadev Yagnik	Hindi	Debut In Bollywood
2018	Shu Thayu?	Deepali	Krishnadev Yagnik	Gujarati	
2019	Short Circuit	Seema	Faisal Hashmi	Gujarati	
2019	Saheb	Mahek	Shailesh Prajapati	Gujarati	
2020	Kem Chho?	Morani	Vipul Sharma	Gujarati	Best Actress Award at Gujarat States Award
2021	Dhummas	Niyati	Kartavya Shah	Gujarati	
2022	53 Mu Panu	Rutu	Kartavya Shah	Gujarati	
2022	Medal	Anjali	Dhaval Jitesh Shukal	Gujarati	
2023	Nava Pappa	Akshara	Ashok Patel	Gujarati	
2023	Var Padharavo Saavdhan	Aanal	Vipul Sharma	Gujarati	Film also released in Kannada Language
2023	3 Ekka	Mansi	Rajesh Sharma	Gujarati	
2026	Behrupiyo		Raja Sanjay Choksi	Gujarati	

== Awards ==
Rajpriya received Best Actress Award at the 2020 Gujarati State Awards for her outstanding performance in the film "Kem Chho?".
