= K. R. Devmani =

Indian film director

- Born: Kirankumar R Devmani; Ahmedabad, Gujarat, India
- Occupation: Film director
- Years active: 2012–present
- Website: official website

Kirankumar R. Devmani is an Indian film director. He has received acclaim for his social-issue based films.

== Career ==
His 2013 film Meghdhanushya was controversial in India due to its focus on gay relationships in India. His film Tame Keva? also received positive response from audiences around Gujarat.

Petipack starring Dhvanit Thaker and Monal Gajjar was released on 22 April 2022. The films Tu Star chhe released on 29 July 2022 and Tu rajee re starring Divyang Thakkar and Janki Bodiwala was released in theatres in 2022.

== Personal life ==
Devmani’s grandfather wanted him to become a doctor so he left engineering and he took admission in J.S. Ayurved college, nadiad to become an ayurveda doctor. While pursuing the degree and his hostel days, he still used to practice and play the piano and violin. He also completed BA in sociology and MA in psychology along with the medical course in Gujarat University. After doing a job as a doctor, he started a clinic and started practicing ayurveda. His father Rameshbhai Devjibhai Devmani was a famous Gujarati writer who won the award of Gujarat Sahitya Akademi. That's why by hereditary he had this attraction towards arts which was also hereditary.

== Filmography ==
| Year | Film | Credited as | Language | Ref. |
|---|---|---|---|---|
| 2011 | Meghdhanushya | Director | Gujarati | |
| 2018 | Tame Keva? | Writer, editor, director, producer | Gujarati | |
| 2022 | Petipack | Writer, director, Lyricist | Gujarati | |
| 2022 | Tu star chhe | Writer, director, Lyricist | Gujarati | |
| 2022 | Tu rajee re | Writer | Gujarati | |
| 2023 | Camera ka kamaal | Director, writer, Lyricist, Producer | Hindi | |
| 2023 | Mast naukri sarkari | Writer, Lyricist | Gujarati | |
| 2023 | Beech mein mat bol | writer, Lyricist | Hindi | |
| 2024 | Malik Ni Varta | Writer, Lyricist, Director | Gujarati | |
