= Kem Chho? =

2020 Gujarati drama film

- Directed by: Vipul Sharma
- Written by: Vipul Sharma
- Produced by: Shailesh Dhameliya
- Starring: Tushar Sadhu; Kinjal Rajpriya; Dilipsinh Jhala; Haresh Dagia; Moin Kureshi
- Cinematography: Sreekumar Nair
- Music by: Rahul Prajapati
- Release date: January 17, 2020
- Running time: 144 minutes
- Country: India
- Language: Gujarati

Kem Chho? (transl. How Are You?) is a 2020 Indian Gujarati-language family drama film written and directed by Vipul Sharma, with Shailesh Dhameliya as the producer. Featuring Tushar Sadhu and Kinjal Rajpriya in substantial roles, it had its music composed by Rahul Prajapati, while Sreekumar Nair handled the cinematography. The film was released on 17 January 2020.

== Plot ==
Mayur Mehta is a married middle-class man facing various problems in his life. He has failed to meet the expectations of friends, family, and society. The film revolves around his daily struggles and his approach to finding solutions. His life's ups and downs lead us through a humorous journey and suggest an approach to living a social life. Mayur decides to attempt suicide but eventually does not go through with it.

== Cast ==
- Tushar Sadhu
- Kinjal Rajpriya
- Dilipsinh Jhala
- Haresh Dagia
- Chetan Daiya
- Jay Pandya
- Jaimini Trivedi
- Kamini Panchal
- Moin kureshi
- Kaushal Vyas

== Soundtrack ==
The soundtracks are composed by Rahul Prajapati and lyrics are written by Milind Gadhavi and Rahul Prajapati.

== Release ==
The film released on 17 January 2020 in India.
