= Saheb (2019 film) =

- Directed by: Shailesh Prajapati
- Written by: Paresh Vyas
- Starring: Malhar Thakar; Kinjal Rajpriya; Nisarg Trivedi; Prashant Barot
- Music by: Amar Khandha
- Release date: 8 February 2019
- Running time: 142 mins
- Country: India
- Language: Gujarati

Saheb is a 2019 Indian Gujarati-language political drama film directed by Shailesh Prajapati and written by Paresh Vyas. It is based on student politics in India and stars Malhar Thakar and Kinjal Rajpriya in the lead roles. The film was released on 8 February 2019.

== Cast ==
- Malhar Thakar as Malhar Palladia
- Kinjal Rajpriya as Mahek
- Nisarg Trivedi as Saumitra
- Prashant Barot as Jayanti Bhai
- Parikshit Tamaliya as Chintu

== Soundtrack ==
The songs of the film are composed by Amar Khandha.

Tracklist
No.	Title	Singer(s)	Length
1.	"Vero Aayo Re"	Amar Khandha	02:10
2.	"Vaage Re"	Amar Khandha	05:55
3.	"Evo Hu"	Amar Khandha	03:18
4.	"Nostalgia (Saheb)"	Amar Khandha	03:07
5.	"Ek Chokro"	Amar Khandha	02:57
6.	"Candle March"		04:12

== Release ==
The film was released on 8 February 2019.

== Reception ==
Saheb received good reviews from critics; The Times of India gave 3.5/5 stars. The user rating is 3.4 based on 1064 user reviews. It received 7.2/10 user rating in BookMyShow based on 1200+ votes. On IMDb the user rating is 5.7/10. Vaishali Rathor, writing for the Times of India, praised the acting of Malhar in the movie.
