= Dinkar Mehta =

Indian politician

Dinkar Krishnalal Mehta (17 October 1907 – 30 August 1989) was an Indian politician and trade unionist. Mehta headed the communist movement in Gujarat for decades – leading the Gujarat state unit of the Communist Party of India between 1936 and 1964, and then the Communist Party of India (Marxist) between 1964 and 1989. He served as a legislator of Bombay State and Mayor of Ahmedabad. Mehta was a prominent leader of the Mahagujarat movement, which struggled for the creation of a Gujarati linguistic state.

== Early life ==
Mehta was born on 17 October 1907. As a young man, Mehta become involved with the Sabarmati Ashram of Mahatma Gandhi. Mehta took part in the 1928 Bardoli Satyagraha and led the 1930 Dharasana Satyagraha. He was jailed for his role in the civil disobedience movements. He graduated in social sciences from Gujarat Vidyapith in 1929, and would later teach there until 1933. In 1934, he took part in founding the Gujarat unit of the Congress Socialist Party (CSP).

== In the Communist Party ==
In 1935, he became a member of the Communist Party of India. As of 1936, the CPI placed him in charge of leading the party in Gujarat. He served as joint secretary of the Congress Socialist Party between 1936 and 1938. He was suspended from the CSP membership in 1938 for disobeying its general secretary's instructions. He organised trade unions and other mass organizations. He spent the years of 1940–1942 underground.

Mehta was arrested in 1948, but managed to escape from jail the following year. He would remain underground until 1951. Mehta stood as the CPI candidate in the Ahmedabad III constituency in the 1952 Bombay Legislative Assembly election, standing against Congress candidate Indumati Chimanlal. Mehta finished in second place with 4,793 votes (17.76%). A by-election for one of the Ahmedabad City seats in the Bombay Legislative Assembly was held on 4 June 1952. The Indian National Congress fielded the Chief Minister Morarji Desai, CPI fielded Mehta. Desai won the seat with 18,583 votes (61.08%) against 11,841 (38.92%) votes for Mehta.

He was elected to the Central Committee of CPI at its 1953 Madurai Party Congress.

== Mahagujarat movement ==
Mehta was the Vice President of Maha Gujarat Janta Parishad between 1957 and 1960. He contested the unreserved seat of Gomtipur constituency in the 1957 Bombay Legislative Assembly election as an independent candidate, obtaining 37,862 votes (897 less votes than the winning candidate). He was a Member of the Legislative Council of the Bombay State between 1958 and 1960. He stood as the Nutan Maha Gujarat Janta Parishad candidate in the Dariapur Kazipur constituency in the 1962 Gujarat Legislative Assembly election, finishing in second place with 17,237 votes (48.69%).

== CPI(M) leader ==
When the CPI was split in 1964, Mehta would join the Communist Party of India (Marxist). Before the split, Mehta was the CPI Gujarat State Council Secretary and a member of the National Council of the party. He had not joined walk-out protest at the CPI National Council meeting on 11 April 1964, which marked the emergence of the Left CPI (later CPI(M)) as a separate party, but was identified as a leftist within CPI. Mehta attended the Tenali convention of the Left CPI in July 1964, and afterwards organised a special convention at Ahmedabad to present a report from Tenali. On 5 August 1964, the Maha Gujarat Janata Parishad organized a state-wide hartal (general strike). Mehta took part in mobilising mill workers to join the strike. After the hartal, Mehta and other party leaders were arrested.

Mehta was elected to the Central Committee of CPI(M) at the 7th Party Congress, held at Calcutta in October–November 1964. He became the Gujarat State Committee Secretary of CPI(M), a post he would hold until his death. Mehta authored many works on Marxist theory in Gujarati language.

Mehta was elected the Mayor of Ahmedabad in 1966, and served in the role until 1967. He contested the Dariapur Kazipur seat again in the 1967 Gujarat Legislative Assembly election, as an independent, finishing in second place with 19,574 votes (43.68%).

Dinkar Mehta died on 30 August 1989. He had suffered from ill health during the last years in his life.
