= Vitamin She =

- Official Poster
- Gujarati: વિટામીન શી
- Directed by: Faisal Hashmi
- Written by: Faisal Hashmi; Mohsin Chavada
- Produced by: Sanjay Raval
- Starring: Dhvanit Thaker; Bhakti Kubavat; Smit Pandya
- Cinematography: Shreedhar Bhatt
- Edited by: Prabaahar; Harsh Shah
- Music by: Mehul Surti
- Production company: Takshashila Entertainment
- Distributed by: Rupam Enterprise
- Release date: 28 July 2017
- Running time: 137 minutes
- Country: India
- Language: Gujarati
- Budget: ₹ 1.35 crore
- Box office: ₹ 3.9 crore

Vitamin She (Gujarati: વિટામીન શી) is a 2017 Gujarati romantic comedy-drama film directed by Faisal Hashmi and produced by Sanjay Raval. The film stars Dhvanit Thaker, with the story based on a male protagonist and his experience with love. The film also explores psychological differences between men and women. The film was released on 28 July 2017 and received a tremendous response from its audience. Vitamin She had a six-week theatre run and was declared a super hit. According to various theater owners in Gujarat, Vitamin She was one of the best produced Gujarati films in recent years after Bey Yaar, Chhello Divas, Gujjubhai The Great and Karsandas Pay & Use and made theatres crowded once again. It became the 7th highest grossing Gujarati film.

== Plot ==
Jigar (Dhvanit Thaker) is a very happy-go-lucky guy. His friends convince him that he needs a girl (Vitamin She) in his life to make his life worth living. One day Jigar accidentally meets Shruti (Bhakti Kubavat) and falls for her. After an initial misunderstanding, they both fall in love with each other. Everything is glossy and colorful in their life. However, after some months, their illusion breaks. Both start to fight over the smallest things. Jigar realizes that love is not eternal but it comes with an expiry date. As they gradually break up with each other, Jigar starts to hate girls. The rest of the film is the story dealing with how Jigar and Shruti learn to understand the true meaning of love and how they unite.

== Cast ==
- Dhvanit Thaker as Jigar.
- Bhakti Kubavat as Shruti.
- Kurush Deboo as Sudhir.
- Ashish Kakkad as Sanjay.
- Kumkum Das as Jayshree.
- Raj Vazir as Jigar's Brother.
- Kamini Panchal as Jigar's Sister in law.
- Smit Pandya as Vadeel.
- Prem Gadhavi as Admin.
- Maulik Nayak as Maniyo.
- Harita Shah as Geeta.
- Tushar Shukla as Old man in bookstore.

== Production ==
=== Writing ===
Writing of the film was started in September 2014. Co-writer of the film Mohsin Chavada admitted the film was based on a real life experiences of the writer's team.

=== Direction ===
Director Faisal Hashmi has described the film as more of a "Real life incidents" story as opposed to a "rom-com". He stated, "We as a men blame girls for their nagging behaviour. But what we don't understand is; there is a hidden love behind it. I wanted to make a movie which is close to reality. In my mind, I wanted it to be something you could relate to. It's about a year in a young guy's relationship. Hashmi also stated that Bhakti's character, Shruti, is based on a stock character type; "Yes, Shruti is an immature view of a woman. She's Jigar's view of a woman." Most of the movie contains voice over, that's why Faisal Hashmi wanted an actor who has an excellent command on language. Hence by the request of producer Sanjay Raval, Dhvanit Thaker was approached for the lead role and he agreed in the very first meeting.

=== Filming ===
Shooting of the film started on 7 May 2015 in Palanpur and successfully completed its first schedule. The second schedule was delayed due to unavailability of some artists. Gradually the second schedule was completed in August 2015. AFter that the film took long time in post-production and faced major delays in release due to demonetization and major Bollywood releases.

=== Marketing ===
First, the song "Chhokri" was released on YouTube and social media by Zee Music Gujarati on 3 July 2017 on became instant hit with 1 million views in just 2 days. Later another song "Maachhalio Ude" was released on 8 July 2017 and it too became superhit on its release and got 1 million views in just 3 days. After songs became major hit, the trailer was uploaded on YouTube and social media by producer Sanjay Raval on 13 July 2017 and it got tremendous response from audience and became instant hit.

== Soundtrack ==
Vitamin She

Soundtrack album by Mehul Surti
- Released: 19 July 2017
- Genre: Feature film soundtrack
- Length: 18:53
- Label: Zee Music

Music for the film is composed by Mehul Surti. The music received very positive response upon its release and praised.

Track list
| No. | Title | Lyrics | Singer(s) | Length |
|---|---|---|---|---|
| 1. | "Vitamin She" | Dhvanit Thaker | Dhvanit Thaker | 3:21 |
| 2. | "Maachhalio Ude" | Raeesh Maniar | Darshan Raval | 3:10 |
| 3. | "Prem Ni Masti" | Raeesh Maniar | Aishwarya Majmudar, Siddharth Amit Bhavsar | 3:12 |
| 4. | "Chhokri" | Raeesh Maniar | Dhvanit Thaker | 3:47 |
| 5. | "E Deewangi" | Raeesh Maniar | Parthiv Gohil | 3:13 |
| 6. | "O Piya" | Tushar Shukla | Aman Lekhadia, Jhanvi Shrimankar | 2:50 |
| Total length: | | | | 18:53 |

== Release ==
The film was released on 28 July 2017.

== Reception ==
The film opened to mostly positive reviews. Divya Bhaskar rated it 4/5 stating that "It's a movie which will make your weekend enjoyable. As a director Faisal Hashmi should be given full marks for this entertaining film." Buddybits rated it 3.5/5 and praised performances, music, direction and dialogues and noted "it’s surely the vitamin must taking." Shruti Jambekar of The Times of India rated it 3/5 calling it "decent entertainer". She praised it for performances, music and direction. Newsfolo.com gave it 3/5 stating it as one time watch movie with some twists of comedy and romance. Movieboxofficecollection.com gave it 4/5 and praised the movie. Jayesh Adhyaru of DeshGujarat rated it 2.5/5 and praised its music but criticized its pace and writing.

== Awards and nominations ==
Gujarati Iconic Film Awards - GIFA
| Year | Category | Nominee | Result | Ref |
|---|---|---|---|---|
| 2017 | Best Debut Male | Dhvanit Thaker | Nominated | |
| 2017 | Best Actress | Bhakti Kubavat | Nominated | |
| 2017 | Best Actor in Comic Role | Smit Pandya | Won | |
| 2017 | Best Supporting Actress | Kumkum Das | Nominated | |
| 2017 | Best Music Director | Mehul Surti | Nominated | |
| 2017 | Best Choreographer | S V Joy Mathi | Nominated | |

Radio City Cine Awards
| Year | Category | Nominee | Result | Ref |
|---|---|---|---|---|
| 2017 | Best Actor | Dhvanit Thaker | Nominated | |
| 2017 | Best Comedian | Smit Pandya | Nominated | |
