= Kirit Parmar =

Indian politician

35th Mayor of Ahmedabad
- In office 10 March 2021 – 11 September 2023
- Deputy: Gitaben Patel
- Preceded by: Bijal Patel
- Succeeded by: Pratibha Jain

Personal details
- Born: 13 August 1966 (age 59) Ahmedabad, Gujarat, India
- Party: BJP

Kirit Parmar (born on 13 August 1966 in Ahmedabad) is an Indian politician who became Mayor of Ahmedabad on 10 March 2021. He was a city councillor from 2010 to 2020. He is a member of the right-wing Hindu nationalist Rashtriya Swayamsevak Sangh. Mayor Kirit Parmar Road in Ahmedabad is named after him.
