= Tame Keva? =

- Theatrical release poster
- Directed by: Dr K R Devmani
- Written by: Milan Devmani; Dr K R Devmani
- Starring: Jakit Khan; Anand Devmani; Ashish Kakkad; Shraddha Suthar
- Cinematography: Milan Devmani
- Music by: Richardson Macwan
- Production company: Dr K R Films
- Release date: 2018
- Country: India
- Language: Gujarati

Tame Keva? is a 2018 Gujarati social drama film starring Jakir Khan and Anand Devmani produced by Dr K R Films. This film is based on urban casteism.

== Plot ==
Ramji, an old Dalit man, is frustrated and annoyed because of casteism around his personal and professional life. Ramji wants to give up his religion but his wife is against it. In the second story, Vishesh is a boy from rich but lower caste family. He wants to marry his girlfriend Vasundhara but Vasundhara's father is against this marriage because of Vishesh's lower caste.

== Cast ==
- Jakir Khan
- Anand Devmani
- Shraddha Suthar
- Jaikrishna Rathod

== Release ==
The film was released on 27 April 2018 across Gujarat
