= 1952 Ahmedabad City by-election =

Election of the Bombay Legislative Assembly

1952 Ahmedabad City VI, VII by-election
4 June 1952
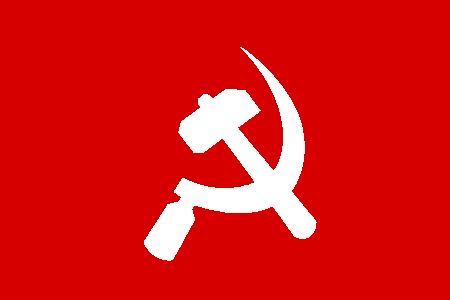
Candidate	Morarji Desai	Dinkar Mehta
Party	INC	CPI
Popular vote	18,583	11,841
Percentage	61.08%	38.92%

On 4 June 1952 a by-election for one of the two seats of the Ahmedabad City nos. VI, VII constituency of the Bombay Legislative Assembly was held. The by-election was called following the resignation of Somnath Prabhashankar Dave.

The Indian National Congress fielded the Chief Minister Morarji Desai whilst the Communist Party of India fielded Dinkar Mehta. Desai won the seat with 18,583 votes (61.08%) against 11,841 (38.92%) votes for Mehta.
