= Amit Shah (mayor) =

Member of Gujarat Legislative Assembly

Amit Popatlal Shah is an Indian politician who served as the mayor of the city of Ahmedabad, in the state of Gujarat, India from 23 October 2005 to 23 April 2008. He also became the member of legislative assembly of Gujarat in the year 2023 from the Ellis Bridge Constituency.

He is affiliated with the BJP. Presently he is president in BJP of Ahmedabad City.

After pursuing his LLB from Gujarat Law Society, Shah joined politics. He is municipal Councillor of Vasna. He always won Corporation's election by a large margin. Shah is famous for not accepting MLA's ticket from area called Vejalpur, Ahmedabad which is BJP's seat..

== Career ==
Shah is an accountant by profession, and worked at the Ahmedabad District Cooperative bank. He is not to be confused with the Gujarat Home Minister, also named Amit Shah , who was chairman of that bank, and who led the successful campaign to have his colleague and namesake chosen as mayor, over the other BJP contenders.

In March 2008, Mayor Shah led a delegation of Ahmedabad leaders to Atlanta, Georgia, to formally apply for his city to be a sister city with the Georgia capital. Shah along with commissioner of Ahmedabad I P Gautam participated in Dubai international transport award function and Ahmedabad municipal corporation won award for administration of BRTS under Shah's leadership. He was succeeded as mayor in April by Kanaji Thakor.

Shah was director of BRTS, Sabarmati Riverfront Project and Chairman of AMTS. Shah was also president BJP Ahmedabad, under his leadership BJP won 152 seats in local election. Shah was leader of BJP, Amdavad Muninicipal Corporation from 2019 to 2021.

=== Political career ===
Amit Popatlal Shah served as the mayor of Ahmedabad prior to his political advancement. He was subsequently appointed as the president of the Ahmedabad unit of the Bharatiya Janata Party (BJP).

== Personal life ==
Shah's elder son Ruchir married the grand daughter of late Ashok Bhatt, former speaker and law minister of Gujarat Vidhansabha. Shah has two children, who are based in Ahmedabad. Sunny Shah, younger son belongs to RSS and BJP and he is president of BJYM, Ahmedabad.
