= Short Circuit (2019 film) =

2019 film by Faisal Hashmi

- Official poster
- Directed by: Faisal Hashmi
- Written by: Faisal Hashmi; Bhargav Purohit; Mohsin Chavada
- Produced by: Twilight Productions
- Starring: Dhvanit Thaker; Kinjal Rajpriya; Smit Pandya
- Cinematography: Jeremy Reagan
- Edited by: Prabaahar
- Music by: Mehul Surti
- Production company: Twilight Productions
- Release date: 11 January 2019
- Running time: 126 minutes
- Country: India
- Language: Gujarati
- Budget: ₹1.5 crore (US$160,000)
- Box office: ₹2.5 crore (US$260,000)

Short Circuit (Gujarati: શોર્ટ સર્કિટ) is a Gujarati science fiction film based on the concept of time loop. It is directed by Faisal Hashmi and was released in 2019. The film is written by Faisal Hashmi, Bhargav Purohit and Mohsin Chavada, produced by Twilight Productions and features Dhvanit Thaker and Kinjal Rajpriya in the lead roles, while Smit Pandya and Utkarsh Mazumdar in supporting roles. Short Circuit received generally positive review from critics upon its release and praised for its direction, plot, VFX and performances. Short Circuit had a successful run at the box office.

== Plot ==
Samay (Dhvanit Thaker) works for an IT company and has a job repairing computers. His mother always nags him to marry soon. Samay falls in love with Seema (Kinjal Rajpriya), who is a news anchor at Zee 24 Kalak. She interviews a scientist, Dr. Parthsarthi (Utkarsh Mazumdar), who is doing some experiments on creating a portable wormhole inside his lab. During the interview, Parthsarthi gets angry and threatens to kill Seema if she gets in his way. Samay is planning to propose to Seema, but, while coming out of the building, a masked man shoots Seema and she dies on the spot. That night, Samay gets drunk with his friend, Bhopa (Smit Pandya) and both of them see Aurora Borealis in the sky. It's a strange event because Aurora never happens in India. Samay goes to bed and sleeps. From the next day, he starts to live the same day again and again. How he saves Seema and how he uncovers the mystery behind the time loop is rest of the film.

== Cast ==
- Dhvanit Thaker as Samay.
- Kinjal Rajpriya as Seema.
- Smit Pandya as Bhopo.
- Utkarsh Mazumdar as Dr. Parthsarthi.
- Vikee Shah as Jacob
- Ragi Jani as Raju Don
- Anshu Joshi as Security Guard

== Production ==
The writing of the film started in August 2017 after director Faisal Hashmi finished his second film Daud Pakad.

Director Faisal Hashmi revealed that the film uses an extensive amount of VFX and it contains around 1,132 VFX shots.

The writers took inspiration from various time loop films.

The script demanded a lab where a secret experiment to create a portable wormhole is taking place. The producers hired NID students to create the lab as per the director's instruction. The set was erected at GMDC ground in Ahmedabad. This was the only set built for the film.

The director hired sound designer Udit Duseja for the sound design. The sound mixing was done at AM Studio, Chennai.

== Marketing and release ==
The teaser was released on 14 December 2018 while the trailer was released on 26 December 2018. Both were well received. Later a promotional song "Samay" was released on 4 January 2019.

== Soundtrack ==
Short Circuit

Soundtrack album by Kedar & Bhargav
- Released: 4 January 2019
- Genre: Feature film soundtrack
- Length: 3:32
- Label: Twilight Productions

Promotional song was composed by Kedar & Bhargav.

Track list
No.	Title	Lyrics	Singer(s)	Length
1.	"Samay"	Milind Gadhvi	Siddharth Bhavsar	3:32
Total length:				3:32

== Release ==
The film was released on 11 January 2019.

== Reception ==
The film received very positive response from audience for its narrative, direction and VFX. Shruti Jambhekar of The Times of India rated the film 3.5 out of 5, praising its direction, VFX, story line, editing and performances. She said; "We have to give it to the production house, director Faisal Hashmi and the entire team for attempting a sci-fi thriller in Gujarati. Considering it’s the first time this genre has been attempted, it’s a pretty decent effort-good VFX, a grand set-up and an interesting (although predictable) story line. Faisal Hashmi deserves a pat on the back for showing considerable improvement as a filmmaker in his second movie." Jayesh Adhyaru rated it 3 out of 5 praising direction, VFX and performances. He noted similarities with 1993 Hollywood film 12:01 and praised for giving credit to it. Divya Bhaskar rated it 3 out of 5 as a decent entertainer praising its direction, storyline, editing and VFX. Badhir Amdavadi rated it 4 out of 5, saying, "It's a complete family entertainer which keeps you hooked till climax."

=== Accolades ===
International Gujarati Film Festival - IGFF
Year	Category	Nominee	Result	Ref
2019	Best Director	Faisal Hashmi	Nominated	
2019	Best Story Writer	Faisal Hashmi, Bhargav Purohit, Mohsin Chavada	Nominated	
2019	Best Screenplay Writer	Faisal Hashmi, Bhargav Purohit, Mohsin Chavada	Nominated	
2019	Best Dialogue Writer	Faisal Hashmi, Bhargav Purohit, Mohsin Chavada	Nominated	
2019	Best Actor	Dhvanit Thaker	Nominated	
2019	Best Actress	Kinjal Rajpriya	Nominated	
2019	Best Actor in Comic Role	Smit Pandya	Nominated	
2019	Best Actor in Negative Role	Vikee Shah	Nominated	
2019	Best Editor	Prabaahar	Won	
2019	Best Cinematography	Jeremy Reagan	Nominated	
2019	Best Background Music	Mehul Surti	Nominated	

Gujarati Iconic Film Awards - GIFA 2019
Year	Category	Nominee	Result	Ref
2019	Best Director	Faisal Hashmi	Nominated	
2019	Best Screenplay Writer	Faisal Hashmi, Bhargav Purohit, Mohsin Chavada	Nominated	
2019	Best Dialogues Writer	Faisal Hashmi, Bhargav Purohit, Mohsin Chavada	Nominated	
2019	Best Film	Short Circuit	Nominated	
2019	Best Editor	Prabaahar	Nominated	
2019	Best Cinematography	Jeremy Reagan	Nominated	
2019	Best Background Music	Mehul Surti	Nominated	
2019	Best Supporting Actor	Smit Pandya	Won	
2019	Best Actor in Negative Role	Vikee Shah	Nominated	
2019	Best Action Director	Haniif Sheikh	Nominated	
