= Faati Ne? =

2025 Indian Gujarati-language film

- Official Poster
- Directed by: Faisal Hashmi
- Written by: Faisal Hashmi; Fenil Dave
- Starring: Hitu Kanodia; Smit Pandya; Hemin Trivedi; Akash Zala
- Cinematography: Jeremy Reagan
- Edited by: Prabaahar
- Production companies: Canus Films, Ahmedabad; Keshwi Production; FullPixel Films, Melbourne
- Distributed by: Rupam Entertainment Pvt. Ltd. SP Cinecorp.
- Release date: 31 January 2025
- Running time: 166 minutes
- Country: India
- Language: Gujarati

Faati Ne? is a 2025 Gujarati language comedy horror film directed by Faisal Hashmi and written by Faisal Hashmi and Fenil Dave. It stars Hitu Kanodia, Smit Pandya, Hemin Trivedi, along with a large ensemble of Australian actors. Released theatrically on 31 January 2025, the film was met with strong positive reception from both critics and audiences. It was widely appreciated for its engaging mix of humor, horror, emotion, drama, and action, as well as for its advanced visual effects and immersive Dolby Atmos sound design.

== Plot ==
Param Laal and Padam Laal, two dimwitted but well-meaning cops in Melbourne, owe their jobs to their legendary uncle Velji. However, their constant blunders get them fired, leaving Param desperate-his daughter's custody hearing is just days away. Their ex-boss (police commissioner), Matthew, offers them a way back: spend a night in a supposedly haunted mansion to prove it's not ghost-infested so it can be sold. Unaware that the mansion is truly cursed and home to a vengeful spirit, the duo must survive a night of terror, uncover the mansion's dark secrets, and fight for their futures, with Param's daughter and Padam's unspoken love both hanging in the balance. Can these two bumbling fools outwit a deadly ghost and turn their luck around?

== Cast ==
- Hitu Kanodia as Param Lal
- Smit Pandya as Padam Lal
- Hemin Trivedi as Baba Bhootmaarina
- Akash Zala as Jhand
- Chetan Daiya as Vikramjeet
- Kaushambi Bhatt as Leelavati
- Michael Igwe as Jack Miller
- Mark Robert Walters as Matthew
- Keira O'Connor as Angelina
- Janine McGrath as Jennifer
- Ryan Thomas Butler as Undercover Agent
- Carlotta Miglolo as Alice
- Daniel Hillman as Mark

== Production ==
On 3 November 2022, the film was announced. The film is produced under the banner of Canus Films in association with Keshwi Production & Fullpixel Films.

=== Filming ===
The film's first shooting schedule commenced on 25 March 2023 in Mumbai and wrapped up in 20 days. The second shooting schedule of the film commenced on 24 April 2023 in Melbourne and wrapped up in 10 days.

== Soundtrack ==
Faati Ne?

Soundtrack album by Soham Naik and Deepak Venugopalan
- Released: 8 January 2025
- Genre: Feature film soundtrack
- Length: 7:53
- Language: Gujarati
- Label: SP Cinecorp

=== Tracklist ===
All lyrics are written by Swaggy The Rapper, Faisal Hashmi and Anil Chavda; all music is composed by Soham Naik and Deepak Venugopalan.

Track listing
No.	Title	Lyrics	Music	Singer(s)	Length
1.	"Aagho Khas"	Swaggy The Rapper	Soham Naik	Umesh Barot	3:33
2.	"Gujarati Waagh"	Faisal Hashmi	Soham Naik	Swaggy The Rapper	1:00
3.	"Pankhida"	Anil Chavda	Deepak Venugopalan	Javed Ali	3:20
Total length:					07:53

== Marketing and releases ==
The film was initially scheduled for release on 19 April 2024, but it was postponed due to 18th Lok Sabha elections and 2024 Indian Premier League. On 20 December 2024, the new release date with a motion poster was announced. The official film poster was revealed on 23 December 2024, followed by the teaser launch on 26 December 2024. The trailer was officially launched on 16 January 2025 in Ahmedabad.

== Reception ==
Kishan Prajapati from Gujarati Jagran rated 4 out of 5, calling it "a thoroughly entertaining blend of horror and comedy." He praised performances of Hitu Kanodia, Smit Pandya and Akash Zala. He noted the setting in Melbourne, engaging story, production, soundtrack and the use of Dolby Atmos sound. Kanksha Vasavada from The Times of India rated 3.5 out of 5. She praised direction, CGI work, music and performance. While the second half felt slightly stretched, she noted that the humor and performances kept the film engaging. VTV Gujarati praised "Faati Ne?" for its dialogues and humor and pointed out some technical flaws. It also praised performance of Smit Pandya. The review noted the film’s effective use of Gujarati cultural humor, Bollywood references, and songs like Padar Ni Omli Hethe.

== See also ==
- List of Gujarati films of 2025
