= List of mayors of Ahmedabad =

The Mayoral office of Ahmedabad has seen various prominent personalities like Sardar Vallabhbhai Patel, who later became first Deputy Prime Minister of India. Aniza Begum Mirza was the first women mayor of a Muslim community in India.

== List of Mayors of Ahmedabad ==
Following is the list of Mayors:

	Mayor Name	From	to	Political Party
37	Hitesh Barot	27 May 2026	Incumbent	Bharatiya Janata Party
36	Pratibha Jain	11 September 2023	27 May 2026	Bharatiya Janata Party
35	Kirit Parmar	10 March 2021	11 September 2023	Bharatiya Janata Party
-	Administrator rule	13 December 2020	10 March 2021	-
34	Bijal Patel	14 June 2018	13 December 2020	Bharatiya Janata Party
33	Gautam Shah	14 December 2015	13 June 2018	Bharatiya Janata Party
32	Meenakshi Patel	30 April 2013	14 December 2015	Bharatiya Janata Party
31	Asit Vora	31 October 2010	30 April 2013	Bharatiya Janata Party
30	Kanaji Thakor	23 April 2008	30 October 2010	Bharatiya Janata Party
29	Amit Shah	23 October 2005	23 April 2008	Bharatiya Janata Party
28	Aneesa Begum Mirza	17 April 2003	22 October 2005	Indian National Congress
27	Himmatsingh Prahladsingh Patel	16 October 2000	16 April 2003	Indian National Congress
26	Maliniben Bharatgiri	20 July 1999	30 June 2002	Bharatiya Janata Party
25	Joitaram Manilal Patel	20 July 1999	30 June 2000	Bharatiya Janata Party
24	Laljibhai Varunbhai Parmar	29 July 1997	30 July 1998	Bharatiya Janata Party
23	Nandlal M Wadhwa	19 July 1996	29 July 1997	Bharatiya Janata Party
22	Bhavnaben Kardamkumar Dave	1 July 1995	19 July 1996	Bharatiya Janata Party
21	Mukulbhai Ishwarbhai Shah	28 February 1992	31 October 1993	Bharatiya Janata Party
20	Prafulbhai Natvarlal Barot	8 February 1991	8 February 1992	Bharatiya Janata Party
19	Gopalbhai Muljibhai Solanki	23 February 1989	8 February 1991	Bharatiya Janata Party
18	Jayendrabhai Trikamlal Pandit	12 February 1987	23 February 1989	Bharatiya Janata Party
17	Jethabhai Doshabhai Parmar	27 April 1984	12 February 1987	Indian National Congress
16	Rafiuddin Abdulrazzak Shaikh	17 July 1980	27 April 1984	
15	Kishanvadan Shankarlal Joshi	10 May 1977	7 July 1980	
14	Vadilal Ratanlal Kamdar	10 April 1976	18 April 1977	
-	Administrator Rule	22 March 1976	10 April 1976	-
13	Kishanvadan Shankarlal Joshi	10 January 1976	22 March 1976	
-	Administrator Rule	25 February 1974	10 January 1976	-
12	Kishanvadan Shankarlal Joshi	11 January 1972	25 February 1974	
11	Narottam Keshavlal Zaveri	7 May 1969	11 January 1972	
10	Somabhai D Desai	6 May 1968	7 May 1969	
9	Vasudev Natvarlal Tripathi	4 May 1967	6 May 1968	
8	Dinkar Kishnlal Mehta	4 May 1966	6 May 1967	
7	Somabhai D Desai	4 May 1965	4 May 1966	
6	Jayakrishnabhai Harivallabhdas Patel	4 May 1961	4 May 1965	
5	Chinubhai Chimanlal Sheth	4 May 1959	4 May 1961	
4	Chinubhai Chimanlal Sheth	4 May 1957	4 May 1959	
3	Chandrakant Chhotalal Gandhi	20 October 1956	4 May 1959	
2	Premchandbhai Vitthaldas Shah	10 September 1956	4 May 1957	
1	Chinubhai Chimanlal Seth	1 July 1950	11 August 1956	
