= Var Padharavo Saavdhan =

2023 Indian Drama Film

- Directed by: Vipul Sharma
- Written by: Vipul Sharma
- Produced by: Shailesh Dhameliya; Anil Sanghvi; Bharat Mistry
- Starring: Tushar Sadhu; Kinjal Rajpriya; Ragi Jani
- Cinematography: Sree Kumar Nair
- Music by: Rahul Prajapati
- Production company: Artmen Films Limited
- Distributed by: Rupam Entertainment Pvt Ltd
- Release date: 7 July 2023
- Running time: 135 minutes
- Country: India
- Language: Gujarati

Var Padharavo Saavdhan is a 2023 Gujarati drama film directed by Vipul Sharma. It stars Tushar Sadhu and Kinjal Rajpriya in lead roles. It is produced by Shailesh Dhameliya, Anil Sanghavi & Bharat Mistry, and distributed by Rupam Entertainment Pvt. Ltd. The music is composed by Rahul Prajapati. Harsh Shah is an Assistant Writer of the film.

== Plot ==
Siddhant is a news anchor who falls in love with Aanal and they decide to get married. On the day of their engagement, Aanal unexpectedly proposes to Siddhant to move into her fathers house after their marriage. What will Siddhant do? Will he adhere to our custom or decide otherwise?

== Cast ==
- Tushar Sadhu
- Kinjal Rajpriya
- Ragi Jani
- Prashant Barot
- Jaimini Trivedi
- Kamini Panchal
- Jay Pandya
- Rhythm Rajyaguru
- Rishabh Thakor

== Production ==
The film is produced under the banner of Artmen Films Limited and Divine Excellence. The music of the film has been given by Rahul Prajapati, and the emerging costume designer Jinkal Shah has designed the costumes for the film. The film has been written by Vipul Sharma.

== Soundtrack ==
Var Padharavo Saavdhan

Studio album by Rahul Prajapati
- Released: 13 June 2023
- Genre: Feature film soundtrack
- Length: 8:38
- Language: Gujarati

=== Tracklist ===
All lyrics are written by Milind Gadhavi; all music is composed by Rahul Prajapati.

No.	Title	Lyrics	Music	Singer(s)	Length
1.	"Ghani Khamma"	Milind Gadhavi	Rahul Prajapati	Aditya Gadhvi	3:59
2.	"Tari Aas Paas"	Milind Gadhavi	Rahul Prajapati	Jigardan Gadhavi & Santvani Trivedi	4:39
Total length:					8:38

== Marketing and release ==
Var Padharavo Saavdhan becomes the first Gujarati movie which is set to release in Kannada as well. The distribution rights for Var Padharavo Saavdhan in the Kannada language have been acquired by Manjunath Gowda's Shalini Artss banner. The trailer of the film got released on 9 June 2023.

== Accolades ==
The film received one nomination at the 21st Transmedia Gujarati Awards.

== See also ==
- List of Gujarati films of 2023
