= Mahendrasinh Parmar =

Gujarati writer

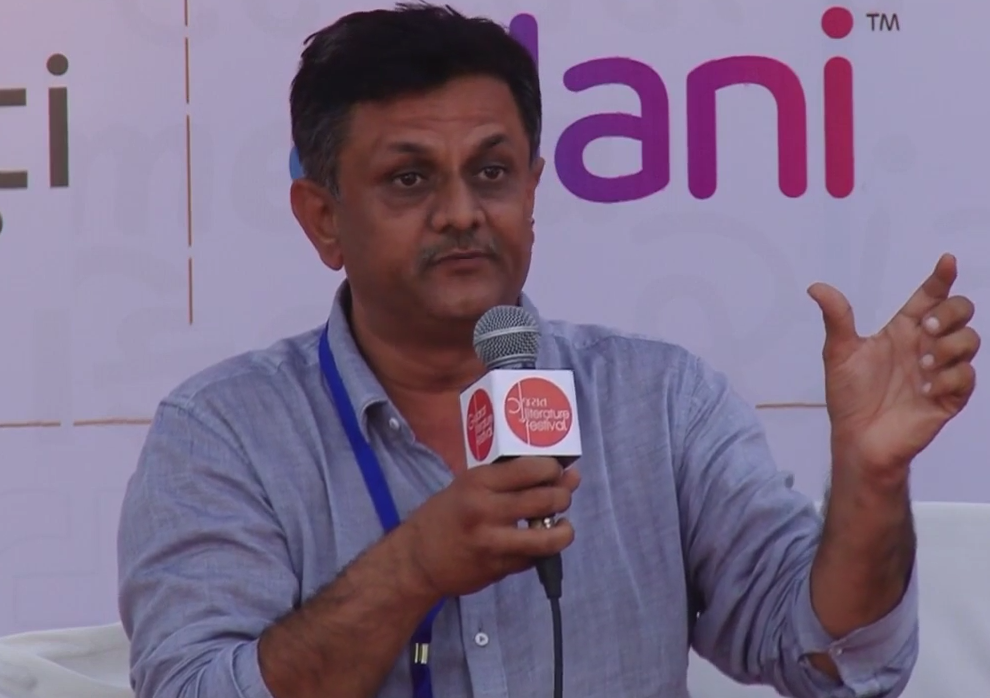
- Mahendrasinh Parmar At Gujarat Literature Festival December 2016
- Born: 2 October 1967 (age 58); Naliya, Kutch district, Gujarat
- Education: Master of Arts; Ph.D.
- Alma mater: Bhavnagar University
- Occupations: writer, playwright
- Writing career
- Language: Gujarati
- Genres: short story, play

Academic background
- Thesis: 'Kishansinh Chavda: A Literary Genious [sic]'
- Doctoral advisor: Vinod Joshi

Mahendrasinh Parmar is a Gujarati writer and professor from Gujarat, India. His works include Polytechnic (2016) and Rakhdu no Kagal (2016). He has also written plays.

== Life ==
He was born on 2 October 1967 in Naliya, a town in Kutch district of Gujarat. He completed his Master of Arts in Gujarati literature from Bhavnagar University and received Ph.D. from same university in 1998. He serves as professor at Bhavnagar University since 1996.

He married in 1996 and has two daughters. He lives in Bhavnagar.

== Works ==
Since 2002, his short stories appeared in various collections of Gujarati short stories. He has done numerous shows of public reading of literary works under the title Vachikam. His critical works were published as Pratham in 2009. Polytechnic (2016) is a short story collection while Rakhdu no Kagal (2016) is a collection of his personal essays. He wrote several plays.

== Awards ==
His book Polytechnic (2016) was shortlisted for the Sahitya Akademi Award (2020).
