= Gautam Shah =

Indian politician

Gautambhai Navalchand Shah is an Indian politician and was Mayor of Ahmedabad, a city in Indian state of Gujarat (2015–2018). He was elected as the 33rd mayor of the city and is affiliated with Bharatiya Janata Party. He is a Councillor from Naranpura ward in Ahmedabad Municipal Corporation and a businessman.

== Career ==
Gautam Shah has business of surgical instruments; also working for insurance for LIC, NIC; got a terminal for the Stock Exchange and has got agency of German company of disposable goods named ‘B/BRAUN’.

From starting he was a volunteer of RSS and had canvassed for Umeshbhai Shukla of Jansangh in counselor selection of Naranpura ward of AMC. At the time of foundation of BJP on 6/4/1980 Gautam Shah went to Delhi then he participated in various programmers at Ahmedabad and from Ratibhai Patel's guidance he started work for BJP. This way he entered in politics.

Then after he joined the student Council by project of Free Classes at Navarang School, which was a part of the project of Free Classes of Student Council in 1981.

- Gautam Shah started work for BJP in Naranpura ward in 1986 and in 1988 became minister of Naranpura ward.
- In 1991 became ‘Mahamantri’ of ‘Yuva Morcha’ of Naranpura ward.
- In 1993 became of ‘Mahamantri’ of ‘Yuva Morcha’ of Sabarmati Vidhansabha.
- In 1994 elected without competition as a Senate Member from M.Com.
