= Abhay R Vasavada =

Indian eye doctor

Dr Abhay R. Vasavada started Raghudeep Eye Clinic (REH) as a cataract speciality center in 1984 Ahmedabad, India. He is the first Indian and the second Asian to be awarded the Binkhorst Medal Lecture by the American Society of Cataract & Refractive Surgeons (ASCRS) in 2011.

Dr. Abhay Vasavada completed his master's degree in ophthalmology (M.S.) from the Maharaja Sayajirao University of Baroda in 1975. He was awarded the degree of a Fellow of the Royal College of Surgeons of England (F.R.C.S.) in 1980. He also completed higher surgical training. He went on to specialize in cataract surgery and intraocular lens implantation.

== Awards ==
- Recipient of best researcher award and Dr. B. C. Roy Award by Honourable President Dr. K.R. Narayanan in 1997.
- In 2002 he was the recipient of 1st Asia Pacific Association of Cataract & Refractive Surgeons (APACRS) Award for Best Educator in Asia Pacific Region.
- He has been a recipient of American Academy of Ophthalmology's Achievement Award, 2005.
- He has also been awarded the Arthur Lim Oration by the Asia-Pacific Association of Cataract and Refractive Surgeons (APACRS) for the year 2010.
