= Amit Shah and the March of BJP =

- Author: Anirban Ganguly and Shiwanand Dwivedi
- Language: English
- Subject: Journey of Amit Shah in BJP
- Genre: Biography
- Published: 2019
- Publisher: Bloomsbury Publishing
- Publication date: 30 April 2019
- Publication place: India
- Pages: 348
- ISBN: 978-9388134132

Amit Shah and the March of BJP is a book written by Anirban Ganguly and Shiwanand Dwivedi. The book focuses on the political journey of Amit Shah. The book also mentions about the evolution of the Bharatiya Janata Party.

== Publication ==
The book written by Anirban Ganguly and Shiwanand Dwivedi, was published first on 30 April 2019, by Bloomsbury Publishing in English. The book was later also published in : Hindi, Bengali, Telugu, Marathi, Tamil, Oriya and Gujarati. Later in 2021 it was also translated in Assamese by Himanta Biswa Sarma. The book has 14 chapters. The published book starts from the chapter titled "From the Lamp to the Lotus" and ends with the chapter "2019 and Challenges".

== Reception ==
Amit Shah and the March of BJP is a book that according to Ganguly narrates the little known story of Amit Shah’s political life, struggles, rise and triumph. A discussion was held in Vivekananda International Foundation on 23 July 2019 by the authors Dr. Anirban Ganguly, and Shiwananda Dwivedi, on the released book.
