= Faisal Hashmi =

Indian film director and screenwriter (born 1985)

- Faisal on the set of his upcoming film in Melbourne (2025).
- Born: 1 August 1985 (age 40); Palanpur, Gujarat
- Education: Mechanical engineering
- Occupations: Film director, screenwriter
- Years active: 2015–present

Faisal Hashmi is an Indian film director and screenwriter best known for pushing the boundaries of Gujarati cinema through innovative storytelling and cutting-edge technology. He made a remarkable debut with Vitamin She, a romantic comedy that turned into a box-office sensation, running housefull for six straight weeks and becoming one of the biggest hits of 2017. Following this, Faisal broke new ground with Short Circuit, Gujarat's first-ever science fiction feature film. The movie not only introduced a new genre to the regional industry but also raised the bar technically, employing a top-tier crew from Bollywood and South India. Short Circuit was both a critical and commercial success, enjoying a successful four-week theatrical run and earning praise for its direction, story, visual effects, and performances. Faisal's third outing, the horror-comedy Faati Ne?, became a runaway hit, running in theaters for over 23 weeks (150+ Days). The film created history as the first Gujarati movie to feature Dolby Atmos sound and to utilize motion capture technology — a bold leap in regional filmmaking.

Faisal is making his Bollywood debut with a high-concept sci-fi thriller titled "Cancer" starring Aahana Kumra and Sharib Hashmi.

== Early life and education ==
Born on August 1, 1985, in Palanpur, Faisal grew up in a modest household — his father a teacher and his mother a homemaker. His passion for cinema was ignited the moment he watched Jurassic Park, and from that point on, he knew he wanted to be a filmmaker. Deeply inspired by Steven Spielberg, Faisal also found creative influence in comic books, especially Amar Chitra Katha, Raj Comics, and other desi superhero stories, which sparked his love for fantastical worlds and imaginative storytelling.

A comic book nerd, Faisal owns a personal collection of over 6,000 comics. He also has a keen interest in astronomy and science, often sharing his enthusiasm for the universe and new scientific discoveries on his social media. Despite graduating in mechanical engineering, he chose not to pursue a stable engineering career, instead following his heart into the world of filmmaking.

== Career ==
Faisal's debut film Vitamin She not only marked his entry into the industry but also earned him critical acclaim and widespread recognition. The film was a commercial blockbuster and won him accolades across the industry. It ran for six housefull weeks in theaters and is considered one of the biggest Gujarati hits in the year 2017. He followed it up with Short Circuit, Gujarat's pioneering science fiction film. The film stood out for its ambitious vision, use of high-end technology, and fresh genre, earning 11 nominations at the Gujarati Iconic Film Awards (GIFA), including Best Director, Best Story, Best Screenplay, and Best Dialogues. It also received multiple nominations at the International Gujarati Film Festival (IGFF), winning Best Editor. Faati Ne?, his third film, reaffirmed his flair for innovation and audience engagement, setting new standards with its technical prowess and mass appeal.

In November 2022, Faisal announced his Bollywood debut titled "Cancer" - a high-concept sci-fi thriller starring Aahana Kumra and Sharib Hashmi.

== Accolades ==
His film Vitamin She got 6 nominations in the Gujarati Iconic Film Awards (GIFA) and won the Best supporting actor category for actor Smit Pandya. His second film Short Circuit got 11 nominations in GIFA including Best Director, Best story, best screenplay, and best dialogues for Faisal Hashmi. Short Circuit was also nominated at IGFF (International Gujarati Film Festival) for several nominations and won Best editor.

== Filmography ==
Year	Title	Director	Writer	Notes
2017	Vitamin She	Yes	Yes	
2019	Short Circuit	Yes	Yes	First Gujarati science fiction film based on "Time Loop"
2025	Faati Ne?	Yes	Yes	First Gujarati film to feature Motion Capture technology and Dolby Atmos sound design. Ran in theaters for over 150 days.
2026	Chikaso	Yes	Yes	
2026	Jyan Jyan Vase Gujarati	Yes	Yes	
2026	Ae Aayu	Yes	Yes	First Gujarati Creature Comedy. First Gujarati movie filmed for IMAX.
