= Meenakshi Patel =

Indian politician

Meenakshi Patel is an Indian politician who served as the 32nd mayor of Ahmedabad city and 4th woman to hold post of Indian state of Gujarat from 30 April 2013 to 14 December 2015. She belongs to Bharatiya Janata Party. She was elected to the post in 2013.

45-year-old Meenaxi Patel created history as the first woman from the Patel community to be elected as mayor. The new Jodhpur ward corporator – Meenaxi or popularly known as 'Meenaben' – was elected as the mayor in a general board meeting of Ahmedabad Municipal Corporation on Tuesday. She is said to have replaced Asit Vora, who completed his term on 30 April.

At the same meeting, Amraiwadi corporator Ramesh Desai was elected deputy mayor. Meenakshi's main challenge and her initial priority consist of traffic management and cleanliness issues plaguing the city majorly.

"The priority will be to solve people's problems and provide them basic amenities like water, road and drainage.", said the 45-year-old mayor.
