= Mission Mummy =

- Directed by: Ashish Kakkad
- Screenplay by: Dipal Soliya; Ashish Kakkad
- Story by: Dhiruben Patel
- Produced by: Nigam Shah; Divyesh Mehta; Sugam Shah
- Starring: Aarti Patel; Raj Vazir; Satyam Sharma; Aashna Mehta; Saumya
- Cinematography: Darshan Dave
- Edited by: Anand Diwan; Deepak Gupta
- Music by: Nishith Mehta
- Production company: Virtual Entertainment
- Distributed by: Rupam Entertainment Pvt. Ltd.
- Release date: 9 December 2016
- Running time: 114:37 Minutes
- Country: India
- Languages: Gujarati; English

Mission Mummy (Gujarati: મિશન મમ્મી), is a 2016 Indian children and family drama film, written and directed by Ashish Kakkad and produced by Nigam Shah, Divyesh Mehta & Sugam Shah. It stars Aarti Patel, Raj Vazir, Satyam Sharma, Aashna Mehta & Saumya Shah in lead roles. This is the second film by Ashish Kakkad, after Better Half. Mission Mummy is produced under the banner of Virtual Entertainment. It is also co-produced by Ashish Kakkad. The story of the film is based on a book by Dhiruben Patel. The screenplay and dialogues are written by Dipak Soliya and Ashish Kakkad. The film celebrates the idea of "being Gujarati" and hence poet and lyricist Tushar Shukla was approached for a song portraying the love for the mother tongue.

== Plot ==
Aparna (Aarti Patel), a working woman, quits her job to become a full-time mother. She raises her three kids Vyom (Satyam Sharma), Saloni (Aashna Mehta) and Vismay (Saumya Shah), with much love and care, and now that the kids are grownups, she is wondering if she should resume her career. Over the years, she has devoted her time and sacrificed her career for her children. But the kids now find her "old fashioned" and start to visualize a new image of her on their own. They demand their mother to be a modern and trendy lady. When Aparna wants to resume her career, the kids gradually intensify their demand to make mummy a modern woman. Their definition of modern is simple: everything has to be "western" and not "Gujarati". Aparna tries to pacify them but peer pressure makes the kids more resolute in their demand for a modern mummy. They call it "mission mummy". The mission is then implemented and everything changes in that family, forever.

The film addresses the gap between mothers and children in Gujarati families, framing it as a division between the culture inside the home and the culture outside, rather than solely a generational difference. The film presents this topic through a lighthearted tone.

== Cast ==
- Aarti Patel, Aparna (Mummy)
- Raj Vazir, Shrikant (Papa), Aparna"s husband
- Satyam, Vyom, eldest son
- Aashna, Saloni, daughter
- Saumya, Vismay, younger son
- Megha Bhojak
- Rohan Mistry
- Ved Choksi
- Himja Bhojak
- Viswa Dalal
- Sakshi Simran
- Hardav Shah
- Maharshi Shah
- Bhagyesh Thakkar
- Deep Joshi
- Khushi Joshi

== Music ==
Mission Mummy

Soundtrack album by Nishith Mehta
- Released: 12 November 2016
- Recorded: 2016
- Genre: Feature film soundtrack
- Length: 37:36
- Label: Virtual Entertainment
- Producer: Nigam Shah

Nishith Mehta chronology
Better Half (2010)	Mission Mummy (2016)	Passport (2016)

Music and background score is composed by Nishith Mehta, with lyrics penned by Narsinh Mehta, Dhiruben Patel, Tushar Shukla and Ashish Kakkad. The music album consists of four "Prabhatiyas" that were written by Narsinh Mehta.

Film"s title track, "Aa Chhe Mission Mummy" is penned by Ashish Kakkad. Another song, "Bhasha Mari Gujarati Chhe" is written by Tushar Shukla. The youngest actor Saumya wrote a song, "Jig Jig Jig Jignesh Bhai" during the shoot of the film, and when the director found it interesting he decided to take it in into the film. Original story writer Dhiruben Patel wrote a song, "Why Do I Have to Miss Her So Much?" for the film that is entirely written in English.

Official music album was released on 12 November 2016 in Ahmedabad, Gujarat. The music is digitally available through Hungama Digital.

Track listing
No.	Title	Lyrics	Singer(s)	Length
1.	"Jaag ne Jadva Krishna Govalia"	Narsinh Mehta	Himali Vyas Nayak	5:16
2.	"Jaagi ne Joun to Jagat Dise Nahi"	Narsinh Mehta	Himali Vyas Nayak	8:45
3.	"Jalkamal Chhandi Jaa ne Bala"	Narsinh Mehta	Himali Vyas Nayak	6:06
4.	"Vaishnav Jan to Tene re kahie"	Narsinh Mehta	Himali Vyas Nayak	5:30
5.	"Morpinchchh Shi Kadi Mulayam"	Tushar Shukla	Himali Vyas Nayak	2:52
6.	"Bhasha Mari Gujarati Chhe"	Tushar Shukla	Gaurang Vyas, Shyamal Munshi, Saumil Munshi, Aarti Munshi, Praful Dave, Sanjay Oza, Himali Vyas Nayak, Rasikraj Barot, Punshi Gadhvi, Urmish Mehta, Vaishali Mehta, Hiral Brahmbhatt, Amip Prajapati, Aashita Prajapati, Bhumik Shah, Riya Shah, Abhita Patel, Prahar Vora, Aashna Mehta, Tathya Solanki, Taksh Shah, Manush Prajapati, Prisha Rachh, Yashvi Vyas, Shreya Lal	4:21
7.	"Aa Chhe Mission Mummy"	Ashish Kakkad	Kushal Choksi, Mousam & Malka Mehta, Aashna Mehta	2:42
8.	"Why do I have to miss her so much?"	Dhiruben Patel	Kushal Choksi	1:42
9.	"Jig Jig Jig Jigneshbhai"	Saumya Shah	Nishith Mehta	0:39
10.	"Tarana"		Himali Vyas Nayak	1:43
Total length:				39:36

== Marketing ==
The film producers started the marketing and promotional campaigns from 13 October 2016. The producers of the film declared the title and release date on their official social media platforms.

== Release ==
Preview screenings for a selected audience were conducted a few days before the actual release. The film was released in Gujarat, Mumbai, and Pune on 9 December 2016.
