= Gujarat State Handloom and Handicrafts Development Corporation =

Gujarat State Handloom and Handicrafts Development Corporation Ltd is an agency of Government of Gujarat established in 1973 with the main objective of identification, revival, development of handicrafts and handlooms of Gujarat. The Corporation markets products of artisans through its Garvi-Gurjari chain of emporiums in India and supply to exporters.

== See also ==
- Khadi
- Khādī Development and Village Industries Commission (Khadi Gramodyog)
