= Ashish Kakkad =

Indian film director

Ashish Kakkad (21 May 1971 – 2 November 2020) was an Indian film director, writer, actor and voice artist from Ahmedabad, Gujarat. He primarily worked in the Gujarati cinema.

== Biography ==
He was interested in theatre and film production since his college days.

He was a pioneer who revived the Gujarati cinema with his 2010 film Better Half which was set in urban backdrop and made with modern filmmaking. The film was critically acclaimed. He had lent his voice in many documentaries and short films. He acted in several Gujarati films and few Hindi films.

He died on 2 November 2020 at 3:45 pm in Kolkata at the age of 49 following a severe heart attack.

== Filmography ==
=== Direction and writing ===
- Better Half (2010)
- Mission Mummy (2016)

=== Acting ===
- Kai Po Che! (Hindi, 2013)
- Bey Yaar (2014)
- Beyond Blue: An Unnerving Tale of a Demented Mind (Hindi, 2015)
- Paghadi
- Vitamin She (2017)
- Tame Keva? (2018)
- Suraynsh (2018)
- Naadi Dosh (2022)
