= Nigam Shah =

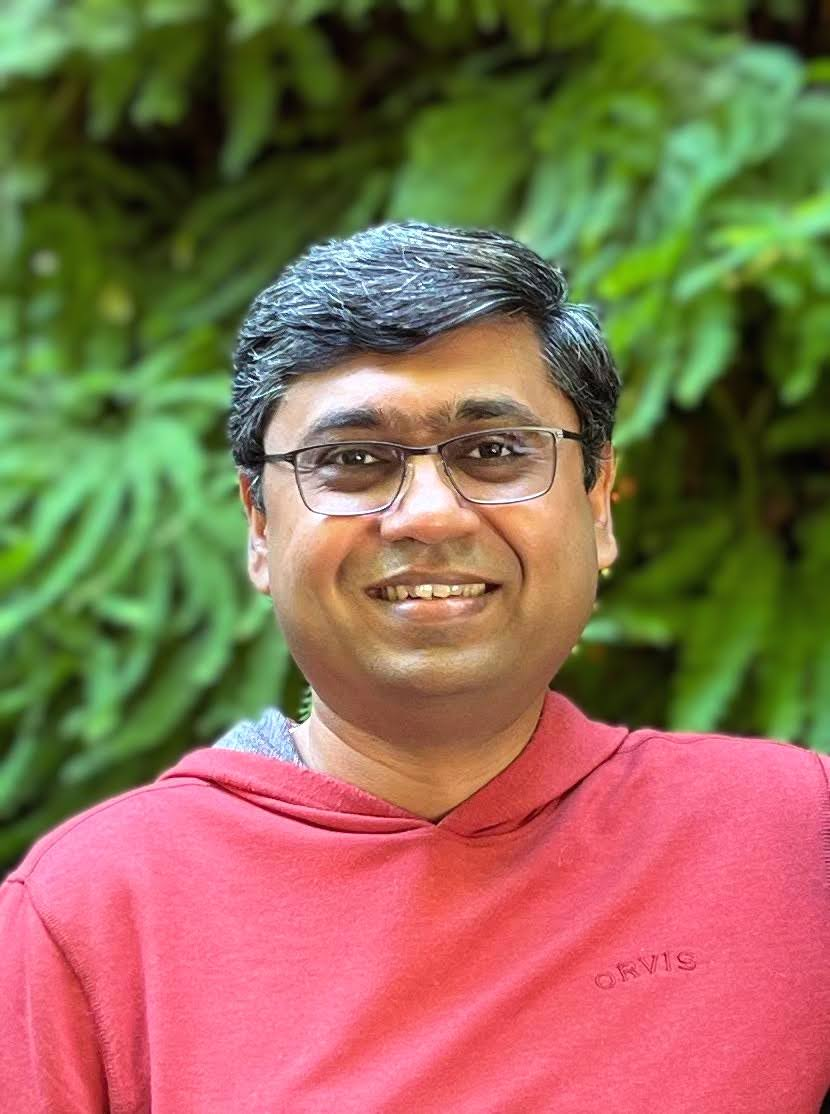
- Born
- Occupations: Scientist, educator and entrepreneur

Academic background
- Education: MBBS; PhD., Integrative Biosciences (Molecular Medicine)
- Alma mater: MS University of Baroda; Pennsylvania State University

Academic work
- Institutions: Stanford University

Nigam Shah is a scientist, educator, and entrepreneur. His research is focused on the application of machine learning, knowledge representation, and artificial intelligence for the analysis of multiple types of health data. He is a professor of Medicine and Biomedical Data Science at Stanford University and the Chief Data Scientist at Stanford Health Care.

Shah has authored over 350 scientific articles. He is the recipient of outstanding and distinguished paper awards, along with the 2012 Stanford School of Medicine Faculty Award for Outstanding Teaching, the 2013 American Medical Informatics Association (AMIA) New Investigator Award, the 2016 Department of Medicine Divisional Teaching Award, and the Stanford Integrated Strategic Plan (ISP) Star Award for heading the Green Button Project in 2019.

Shah was elected as a Fellow of the American College of Medical Informatics (ACMI) in 2015, was inducted into the American Society for Clinical Investigation (ASCI) in 2016, and was selected into the Stanford Medicine Leadership Academy in 2017.

== Education ==
Shah earned an MBBS from Baroda Medical College, MS University of Baroda, India, in 1999, followed by a PhD in Integrative Biosciences from Pennsylvania State University in 2005, and completed his postdoctoral training at Stanford University in 2007.

== Career ==
Shah began his academic career as a Research Scientist at the Stanford University School of Medicine, and joined the faculty in 2011. He teaches in the Biomedical Informatics (BMI) graduate degree program, holding the positions of Professor of Medicine, Associate Dean of Research, and Chief Data Scientist at Stanford Health Care. Since 2021, he has taught in the Master of Science in Clinical Informatics Management (MCiM) and launched the AI in Healthcare Specialization on Coursera.

Shah is the co-founder of three companies, including Kyron, Prealize Health, and Atropos Health, and serves on the boards of the latter two. Later, he co-founded two community groups, namely the Observational Health Data Sciences and Informatics (OHDSI) as well as the Coalition for Health AI (CHAI), which provides guidelines for the responsible use of AI in healthcare. He is a Member of the National Academy of Medicine's Digital Learning Collaborative and serves as an invited expert for the AI/ML Working group.

== Research ==
Shah's research centers on developing safe, ethical, and cost-effective machine learning and AI models for clinical use, leveraging electronic health data across diverse medical disciplines to improve drug safety, practice patterns, predictive models, and quality of care. He holds nine patents and patent applications for his work, and his research, has been covered in the New York Times, Wall Street Journal, Harvard Business Review, and NPR.

=== Foundation models in medicine ===
Shah has focused on shaping the creation and adoption of foundation models in medicine by provisioning relevant training data, specifying the desired benefits, and evaluating the benefits via testing in real-world deployments. His team released the foundation models that are trained using de-identified, longitudinal electronic health records along with a benchmarking dataset with manually verified labels for open comparison of technical advances.

=== Predictive models for healthcare ===
Shah's research towards combining machine learning, text-mining, and prior knowledge has shown that by using data from electronic medical records it is possible to build predictive models for guiding clinical care, such as early treatment of certain wounds, finding undiagnosed genetic diseases, and prioritizing advance care planning. His work has revealed that evaluation needs to look beyond the model and also consider the consequences resulting from the actions triggered or prevented based on the model's output.

=== Learning from collective clinical practice ===
Shah worked on learning from the collective practice of clinicians spanning the care of multiple patients, and has established the feasibility of learning from "patients like mine". A large portion of his research focused on validating the core informatics methods to enable such use of aggregate patient data, leading to the Green Button initiative. He later operated a bedside consultation service in the USA that provides a clinician with an on-demand summary of similar patients in terms of the treatment choices made and observed outcomes.

=== Pharmacovigilance ===
Shah's early analysis of pharmacovigilance using electronic medical records has demonstrated that it is possible to monitor for adverse drug events, learn drug-drug interactions, and identify off-label drug usage using unstructured data. This work has been acknowledged in editorials as "...the cutting edge of drug safety and pharmacovigilance science" and has been highlighted for best practices in the application of common data models to promote the expansion of EHR-based pharmacovigilance.

=== Ontology annotation and recommendation ===
In prior work, Shah developed a Web service at the National Center for Biomedical Ontology, called the Annotator Web service, which enables users to tag datasets with terms from any of the several hundred ontologies in BioPortal. In subsequent work, he created the Ontology Recommender Web service, which suggests ontologies for use in tagging a given dataset. His work demonstrated that using simple term recognition methods results in little or no impact on accuracy for multiple clinical tasks with the advantage of scaling to very large datasets.

== Awards and honors ==
- 2013 – New Investigator Award, American Medical Informatics Association
- 2015 – Fellow, American College of Medical Informatics
- 2016 – Divisional Teaching Award, Stanford University Department of Medicine
- 2016 – Member, American Society for Clinical Investigation
- 2019 – Integrated Strategic Plan (ISP) Star Award, Stanford University

== Selected articles ==
- Noy, N. F., Shah, N. H., Whetzel, P. L., Dai, B., Dorf, M., Griffith, N., ... & Musen, M. A. (2009). BioPortal: ontologies and integrated data resources at the click of a mouse. Nucleic Acids Research, 37(suppl_2), W170-W173.
- Shah, N. H., LePendu, P., Bauer-Mehren, A., Ghebremariam, Y. T., Iyer, S. V., Marcus, J., ... & Leeper, N. J. (2015). Proton pump inhibitor usage and the risk of myocardial infarction in the general population. PloS one, 10(6), e0124653.
- Hripcsak, G., Duke, J. D., Shah, N. H., Reich, C. G., Huser, V., Schuemie, M. J., ... & Ryan, P. B. (2015). Observational Health Data Sciences and Informatics (OHDSI): opportunities for observational researchers. Studies in health technology and informatics, 216, 574.
- Char, D. S., Shah, N. H., & Magnus, D. (2018). Implementing machine learning in health care—addressing ethical challenges. The New England Journal of Medicine, 378(11), 981.
- Rajkomar, A., Oren, E., Chen, K., Dai, A. M., Hajaj, N., Hardt, M., ... & Dean, J. (2018). Scalable and accurate deep learning with electronic health records. NPJ digital medicine, 1(1), 1–10.
- Shah, N. H., Halamka, J. D., Saria, S., Pencina, M., Tazbaz, T., Tripathi, M., ... & Anderson, B. (2024). A nationwide network of health AI assurance laboratories. JAMA, 331(3), 245–249.
