= Kanaji Thakor =

Indian politician

Kanaji Shankarji Thakor was an Indian politician who served as the mayor of the city of Ahmedabad, in the state of Gujarat, India from 23 April 2008 to 30 October 2010. He is affiliated with Bharatiya Janata Party.
