= Jay Vasavada =

Gujarati writer

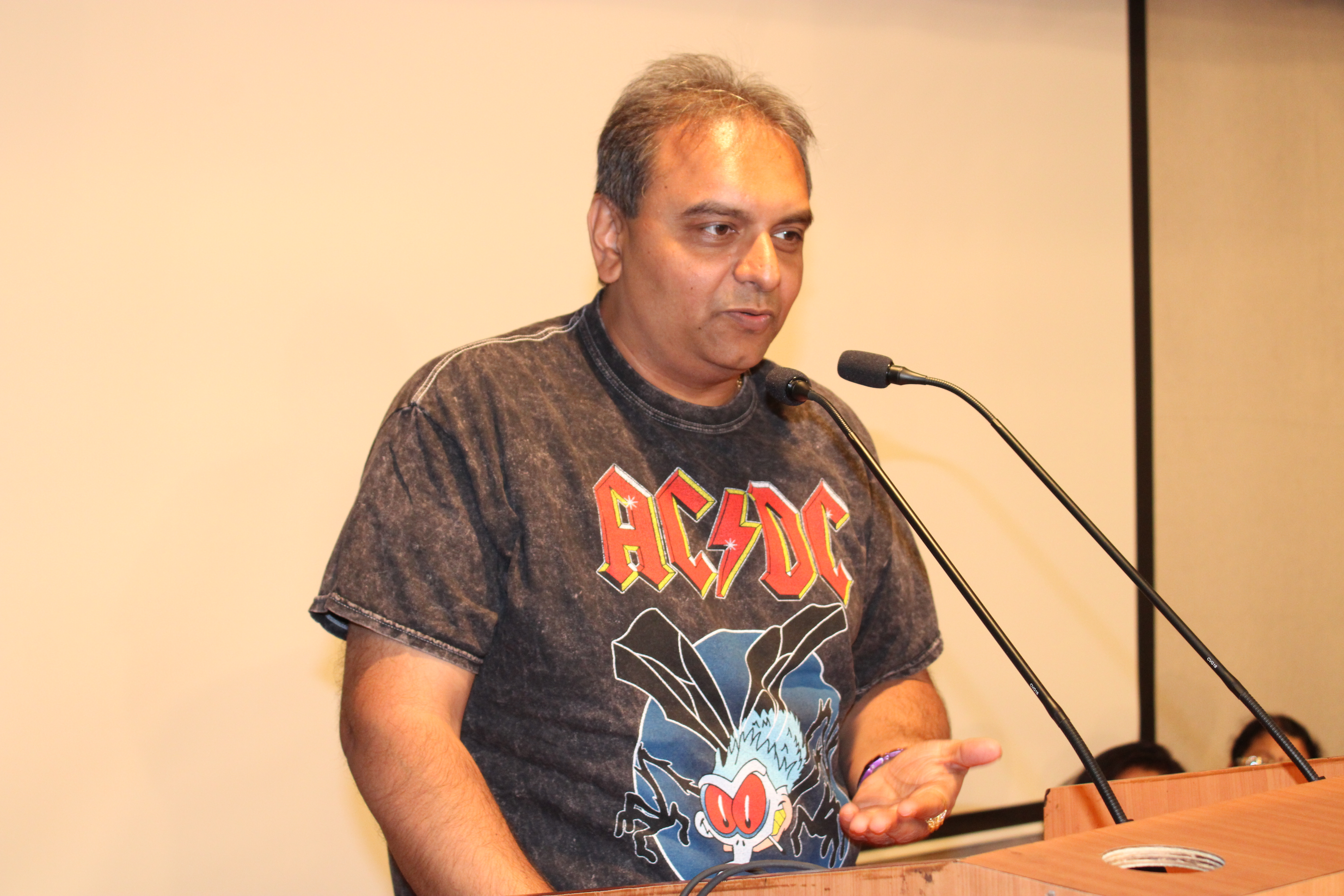
- Vasavada at Gujarat Vishwakosh Trust in 2018
- Born: 6 October 1973 (age 52); Bhavnagar, Gujarat, India
- Occupations: Columnist, orator
- Years active: 1996–present
- Parent(s): Jayshree, Lalit Vasavada

Jay Vasavada is Gujarati language writer, orator and columnist from India. Born in Bhavnagar and brought up in Gondal, Gujarat, he writes columns in various publications since 1996. He has published several books compiling his columns.

== Early life ==
Jay Vasavada was born on 6 October 1973 in Bhavnagar, Gujarat, India. His father Lalit Vasavada was a lecturer of Gujarati language, and his mother Jayshree Vasavada was a matron at Adhyapan Mandir, Junagadh. His mother left job after his birth and become full-time housewife and his teacher. He completed his primary education studying at home. He completed his secondary education from Vidhya Mandir School, Gondal. He joined Swaminarayan Gurukul for higher secondary education in science. He failed in 12th grade board examinations. He later enrolled in commerce education. He passed higher secondary and graduated with specialization in management.

== Career ==
He served as a lecturer of marketing for three years in Commerce College affiliated with Saurashtra University. He later served as principal-in-charge. He frequently lectures at Academic Staff College, Saurashtra University.

His writing career started with articles published in newspaper in Rajkot. He later joined Gujarat Samachar as columnist in 1996 which publishes his two weekly columns, Anavrutta and Spectrometre. He writes column Rangat Sangat in Gujarati weekly Abhiyaan since 2008. He previously wrote daily column in Mumbai edition of Mid-day. He wrote for Anokhee, Aarpaar and Gujarat monthlies. He delivers lectures across Gujarat on different subjects.

He hosted Gujarati celebrity talk show Samvaad on ETV Gujarati for 225 episodes. He served as writer and anchor of cultural TV series Aaswaad on DD Girnar. He frequently delivers speeches on All India Radio. He had scripted and presented weekend radio show Cinema Sizzlers on BIG FM 92.7 Rajkot. He performed a cameo in Gujarati film Bey Yaar (2014).

He was honored with a special award by a World Talent Organization in the World Amazing Talent Category for his dedicated work towards Gujarati Literature.

== Works ==
He published several books compiling his columns in collections; Yuvahava, Mahiti Ane Manoranjan, Sahitya Ane Cinema, Aah Hindustan Oh Hindustan, Spectrometre (2001), Life@Kite, Anavrutta (2008), Science Samandar, Knowledge Nagariya, G.K. Jungle, JSK - Jai Shri Krishna, Preet Kiye Sukh Hoy (2010), Jai Ho (2012), Vacation Station (2015), Mummy Pappa (2016).

== See also ==
- List of Gujarati-language writers
