= Hemang Dave =

Gujarati Actor and singer

- Born: 2 January 1983 (age 43); Ahmedabad, Gujarat, India
- Occupation: Actor
- Years active: 2010–present
- Spouse: Jalpa Dave

Hemang Dave is an Indian actor and singer from Gujarat, India. He works in Gujarati film. He has been a part of movies like Bey Yaar, Bas Ek Chance, Romeo & Radhika and Tamburo. His 2018 releases include Aavuj Reshe and Chhutti Jashe Chhakka. His upcoming movies are BaagadBillaa and Peti Pack.

== Early life and education ==
Hemang Dave was born on 1 January 1983 at Ahmedabad City. Hemang had an inclination towards music since childhood, started learning the tabla from the age of 6.

== Career ==
He started acting in 2010 with theatre and the first play was Lady Lalkuwar in 2010. In 2011 done the first Gujarati film Kevi Rite Jaish, Be Yaar in 2014. He made his acting debut on the silver screen with the Jay Bhatt's Gujarati comedy movie Thai Jashe, also starring Manoj Joshi, Malhar Thakar and Monal Gajjar. He is popularly known for his notable work in movies including Order Order Out of Order, Tari Maate Once More, Chhutti Jashe Chhakka and Thai Jashe.

He has been worked in many Hindi and Gujarati language plays like "Kasturba", "Akupaar", "Shukdaan", "Dakhla Tarike", "Achlayatan", "Kahyaghra Kantilal", "Bollywood Masala", "Jagi Ne Jounto", "Koi Pan Ek Phool nu Naam Bolo To", "Mera Pia Ghar Aaya" and "Mukti Bandhan".

== Filmography ==
=== 2014 ===
- Be Yaar

=== 2015 ===
- Bas Ek Chance

=== 2016 ===
- Thai Jashe as Deepak Dua
- Romeo & Radhika

=== 2017 ===
- Tamburo

=== 2018 ===
- Tari Maate Once More as Harry
- Chhutti Jashe Chhakka
- Aavuj Reshe
- Pagalpanti

=== 2019 ===
- Order Order Out of Order

=== 2022 ===
- Petipack
- Adko Dadko
- Jaysukh Zadpayo
- Kahani Rubberband Ki
- Ghantadi
- Medal (film)
- Bhagwan Bachave

=== 2024 ===
- Jhopadpatti

=== 2025 ===
- Mom Tane Nai Samjay
- Ilu Ilu

=== 2026 ===
- Lagan Laagii Re
- Vaanki Chuki Love Story

== Theatre ==
- Kasturba
- Akupaar
- Shukdaan
- Dakhla Tarike
- Achlayatan
- kahyaghra Kantilal
- Bollywood Masala
- Jagi Ne Jounto
- Koi Pan Ek Phool nu Naam Bolo To
- Mera Pia Ghar Aaya
- Mukti Bandhan
