= Bharat Chawda =

Indian actor

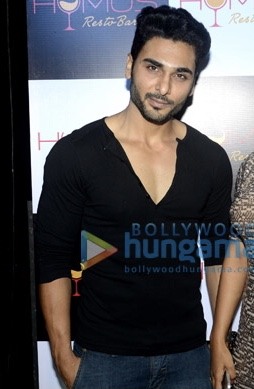
- Occupation: Actor
- Years active: 2007–present

Bharat Chawda is an Indian actor. He is best known for playing the role of Bobby Sood as Shraddha's husband in the television serial Meri Bhabhi.

== Career ==
Bharat started his career as a contestant in season 1 of Zee Cine stars ki Khoj in 2004 and then with Kahaani Ghar Ghar Kii as Ishaan on Star Plus, He also appeared in various shows including: Crime Patrol, Haunted Nights, Savdhaan India @ 11 & Fear Files: Darr Ki Sacchi Tasvirein. He played as Bobby in Meri Bhabhi on STAR Plus.

== Television ==
List of television credits
| Year | Title | Role |
|---|---|---|
| 2007 | Sssshhh Phir Koi Hai | Episodic Role "Choona Mana Hai" Aryamaan |
| 2007 | Sssshhh Phir Koi Hai | Episodic Role "Baat Ek Raat Ki" |
| 2007 | Kahaani Ghar Ghar Kii | Ishaan |
| 2007 | Choona Mana Hai | N/A |
| 2008 | Kasturi | |
| 2009 | Kuch iss Tarah | |
| 2009–11 | Bandini | Shashank Rasik Mehta |
| 2011 | Maayke Se Bandhi Dor | Muksaare |
| 2011 | Crime Patrol | cameo |
| 2012 | Haunted Nights | N/A |
| 2013 | Meri Bhabhi | Bobby Sood |
| 2014 | Aur Pyaar Ho Gaya | Virat |
| 2014 | Uttaran | Yuvaan / Yuvraj Singh Bundela |
| 2015 | Box Cricket League | Delhi Dragons |
| 2015 | Humsafars | ACP Rathore |

== Film ==
List of film credits
| Year | Title | Role | Language |
|---|---|---|---|
| 2013 | Goliyon Ki Raasleela Ram-Leela | Manga | Hindi |
| 2017 | Shubh Aarambh | Shubh | Gujarati |
| 2017 | Tamburo (film) | Hardik | Gujarati |
| 2018 | Chhutti Jashe Chhakka | NaagRaj | Gujarati |
| 2018 | Family Circus | Aarav | Gujarati |
| 2018 | Tari Maate Once More | Mihir | Gujarati |
| 2020 | Affraa Taffri | Rao ji | Gujarati |
| 2022 | Raado | Darshan | Gujarati |
| 2022 | Hoon Tari Heer | Harry | Gujarati |
| 2024 | Dayro | Yuvi | Gujarati |
| 2024 | Maru Mann Taru Thayu | Om | Gujarati |
| 2024 | Bhalle Padharya | Abhishek | Gujarati |
