= Medal (film) =

2022 Indian Gujarati film

- Directed by: Dhaval Jitesh Shukal
- Written by: Vaishakh Ratanben
- Produced by: Dhruvin Dakshesh Shah
- Starring: Jayesh More; Kinjal Rajpriya; Maulik Nayak; Hemang Dave; Chetan Daiya; Archan Trivedi
- Cinematography: Tapan Vyas
- Music by: Kushal Chokshi
- Production company: Navkar Production
- Distributed by: Rupam Entertainment
- Release date: 25 November 2022
- Running time: 166 minutes
- Country: India
- Language: Gujarati

Medal is a 2022 Gujarati film directed by Dhaval Jitesh Shukal. It stars Jayesh More, Kinjal Rajpriya, Maulik Nayak, Hemang Dave, Chetan Daiya, and others.The film was written by Vaishak Ratanben, edited by Rraja Sanjay Chokshi, produced by Dhruvin Dakshesh Shah, and distributed by Rupam Entertainment.

== Plot ==
A young English teacher chooses to teach at a government school by declining a dream job at private school. He fights against social stigmas, cultivate young minds and trains them to win a Medal at Khel Kala Mahakumbh, will they win?

== Cast ==
- Jayesh More as Ajit
- Kinjal Rajpriya as Anjali Mehta
- Maulik Nayak as Raman
- Hemang Dave as Mohan
- Vaishakh Ratanben as Girish
- Chetan Daiya as the sarpanch of Timli
- Bhavya Sirohi as Jashoda ("Jasli")
- Archan Trivedi as the principal of Timli school
- Shounak Vyas
- Aakash Zala
- Nisarg Trivedi
- Jagurti Thakor
- Arvind Vegda
- Haresh Dagia
- Dipen Raval
- Niyati Suthar
- Master Karan Patel
- Kabir Daiya
- Arya Sagar
- Rishabh Thakor
- Rishi Panchal

== Marketing and Release ==
The teaser of the film was released at the end of August by the producer, Dhruvin Shah. The official trailer was released on YouTube on 19 October 2022. The film was released on 25 November 2022.

== Soundtrack ==
Medal

Studio album by Kushal Chokshi
- Released: 2 September 2022
- Genre: Feature film soundtrack
- Label: Navkar Music

=== Tracklist ===
The soundtrack of the album is composed by Kushal Chokshi with lyrics written by Niren Bhatt. The soundtrack album consists of eight tracks.

No.	Title	Lyrics	Music	Singer(s)	Length
1.	"Medal Anthem"	Munaf Luhar	Kushal Chokshi	Kushal Chokshi and Kids	1:03
2.	"Tarla No Desh"	Munaf Luhar	Kushal Chokshi	Aditya Gadhvi	3:26
3.	"Ehsaas Taro"	Munaf Luhar	Kushal Chokshi	Parthiv Gohil	2:55
4.	"Medal Motivation"	Munaf Luhar	Kushal Chokshi	Kushal Chokshi & Kids	2:35
5.	"Ehasaas Taro (Unplugged)"	Munaf Luhar	Kushal Chokshi	Kavya Limaye	3:04
6.	"Aabhla No Desh"	Munaf Luhar	Kushal Chokshi	Aditya Gadhvi	3:04
7.	"Asatyo Mahe Thi"	Nanalal Dalpatram Kavi	Kushal Chokshi	Parthiv Gohil, Kushal Chokshi, and Kids	2:19
8.	"Bhai Bhai 3"	Arvind Vegda	Arvind Vegda	Arvind Vegda	2:14

== Reception ==
Rachana Joshi of Gujarati Mid-Day rated it 4 stars out of 5. She praised the performances, direction and story but criticised the music.
