= Bigg Boss (Hindi TV series) season 9 =

Indian reality show

Bigg Boss
- Season 9
- Presented by: Salman Khan
- No. of days: 104
- No. of housemates: 20
- Winner: Prince Narula
- Runner-up: Rishabh Sinha
- No. of episodes: 105

Release
- Original release: 11 October 2015 – 23 January 2016

Season chronology
- ← Previous; Halla Bol Next → Season 10

Bigg Boss Double Trouble (stylized as Bigg Boss 9) is the ninth season of the Indian reality TV series Bigg Boss that premiered on 11 October 2015 on Colors TV. This season ended on 23 January 2016. Salman Khan returned to host the ninth season. The series was won by Prince Narula, and Rishabh Sinha was the runner-up.

== Production ==
=== House theme ===
The house theme mainly focuses on aesthetics to adapt to the underlying premiere twist for the ninth season which revolves around the housemates entering the house in pairs rather than as individual housemates. The house sections are replicated to depict places in history and around the globe. The exterior of the house is crafted to recreate the Garden of Eden. It features a fortune teller machine and a wide canopy. The kitchen contains most of its sculptural and art pieces from the architecture of Santorini while the bathroom area follows a glitzy Las Vegas theme. The bathroom walls are lined with mirrors and most of the furniture is crimson. The bedroom contains all double bed and the confession room is situated between the kitchen and the living area as with every series since 2011, featuring a royal themed chair. The housemate wall has been installed for the first time in house with the LED screens to keep track of housemates' status.

== Housemates status ==
Sr	Housemate	Day entered	Day exited	Status
1	Prince	Day 1	Day 104	Winner
2	Rishabh	Day 22	Day 104	1st runner-up
3	Mandana	Day 1	Day 104	2nd runner-up
4	Rochelle	Day 1	Day 104	3rd runner-up
5	Keith	Day 1	Day 101	Evicted
6	Priya	Day 43	Day 96	Evicted
7	Kishwer	Day 1	Day 89	Walked
8	Suyyash	Day 1	Day 84	Evicted
9	Nora	Day 58	Day 83	Evicted
10	Gizele	Day 58	Day 77	Evicted by Captain
11	Kawaljit	Day 40	Day 63	Evicted
12	Digangana	Day 1	Day 57	Evicted by Housemates
13	Rimi	Day 1	Day 51	Evicted
14	Aman	Day 1	Day 42	Evicted
15	Puneet	Day 1	Day 35	Evicted by Housemates
16	Yuvika	Day 1	Day 28	Evicted
17	Vikas	Day 1	Day 21	Evicted
18	Arvind	Day 1	Day 20	Evicted
19	Roopal	Day 1	Day 14	Evicted
20	Ankit	Day 1	Day 7	Evicted

== Housemates ==
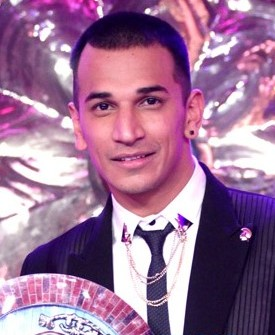
The winner of the season, Prince Narula with the trophy

The participants in the order of appearance and entered in the house are:

=== Original entrants ===
- Digangana Suryavanshi – TV actress. She played Veera in the show Ek Veer Ki Ardaas...Veera.
- Roopal Tyagi – TV Actress. She is best known for a role of Gunjan in the show Sapne Suhane Ladakpan Ke and was last seen in Jhalak Dikhhla Jaa Reloaded
- Kishwer Merchant – TV actress. She is mainly known for her portrayal of negative roles. She appeared in the television series Hip Hip Hooray in 1999.
- Suyyash Rai – TV Actor, singer. Suyyash has been a part of many shows. He met Kishwer on the sets of show Pyaar Kii Ye Ek Kahaani.
- Aman Verma – TV actor. Aman has appeared in Ekta's show Kyunki Saas Bhi Kabhi Bahu Thi
- Rimi Sen – Film actress. She was seen in the film Golmaal.
- Yuvika Chaudhary – Actress. She appeared in the reality show India's Best Cinestars Ki Khoj and film Om Shanti Om
- Vikas Bhalla – Actor, singer. He is known for appearing in the show Uttaran playing Veer. He sung the song 'Po Po' from the film Son Of Sardaar.
- Mandana Karimi – Iranian film actress, model. Mandana appeared in films like Roy and Main Aur Charles.
- Rochelle Rao – Model. She won Miss India in 2012. She appeared in reality shows like Fear Factor: Khatron Ke Khiladi 5 and Jhalak Dikhhla Jaa 6.
- Keith Sequeira – Actor, model. He appeared in TV shows like Dekho Magar Pyaar Se, Diya Aur Baati Hum, Doli Armaano Ki and film Calendar Girls
- Prince Narula – Reality TV actor. Prince was the winner of MTV Roadies 12 and MTV Splitsvilla 8.
- Ankit Gera – TV actor. He appeared in shows like Mann Kee Awaaz Pratigya and Sapne Suhane Ladakpan Ke.
- Arvind Vegda – Singer. He sung the song 'Bhai Bhai' in the film Goliyon Ki Raasleela Ram-Leela.

=== Wild card entries ===
- Rishabh Sinha – TV actor. He appeared in the popular series Qubool Hai and reality show MTV Splitsvilla
- Puneet Vashist – Actor. He was last seen in Colors show Shastri Sisters.
- Kawaljit Singh – Fashion designer.
- Priya Malik – Teacher. She was a contestant on Big Brother Australia
- Nora Fatehi – Dancer, singer, model, actress. She debuted with the film Roar: Tigers of the Sundarbans
- Gizele Thakral – Model, actress. She appeared in reality shows Survivor India and Welcome – Baazi Mehmaan Nawazi Ki.

=== Guest entrants ===
- Sargun Mehta – Actress.

== Guest appearances ==
This season, like the previous one, also featured a 'Special Panel', where a team of past housemates or their acquaintances would share their and public's views and opinions of the current housemates before the eviction. The panel would rotate every week.

Week(s)	Guest(s)	Notes
Grand Premiere	Elli Avram (Bigg Boss 7 contestant) & Daisy Shah	Appeared as guests
1	Shahid Kapoor and Alia Bhatt	Appeared on the Saturday show to promote their film Shaandaar.
1	Sonam Kapoor	Appeared on the Eviction night to promote her film Prem Ratan Dhan Payo.
1	Ayushmann Khurrana and Aakash Soni	
2	Randeep Hooda	To promote their film Main Aur Charles
2	Digangana's mother, Prince's sister, Kishwar's mother, Suyyash's sister	Came to explain how their children and siblings are doing
3	Karan Kundra & Shaleen Malhotra	To support Prince Narula & Suyyash Rai
4	Sargun Mehta, Sana Khan (Season 6), Andy Kumar, (Season 7), & Ali Quli Mirza (Season 8)	To perform as guests for BB Hotel task.
4	Sonam Kapoor, Neil Nitin Mukesh, Armaan Kohli, Aashika Bhatia	To promote their film Prem Ratan Dhan Payo.
5	Gautam Gulati, Kamya Panjabi, Anlyst Karma.	Ex Contestans of (Season 7) & (Season 8) came as panellists
5	Karan Singh Grover, Sharman Joshi, Daisy Shah & Zareen Khan	To promote their film Hate Story 3
6	Deepika Padukone	To promote her film Tamasha
7	Kriti Sanon, Varun Dhawan	To promote their film Dilwale
8	Ranveer Singh	To promote his film Bajirao Mastani
9	Mouni Roy	To promote her show Naagin
10	Malishka Mendonsa	Guest Appearance
10	Kajol & Shahrukh Khan	To promote their film Dilwale
11	Shruti Sinha	To meet brother Rishabh
11	Rizwana Merchant	To meet her daughter Kishwer
11	Paloma Rao	To meet her sister Rochelle
11	Bhushan Malik	To meet his wife Priya
11	Prince's sister	To meet her brother Prince
11	Shruti Rai	To meet her brother Suyyash
12	Adaa Khan, Sidharth Shukla, Sunil Grover (Gutthi)	Special Guests for New Year Special
12	Juhi Chawla	To promote her film Chalk n Duster
12	Sunny Deol	To promote his film Ghayal: Once Again
12	Tanishaa Mukerji	Special Appearance
13	Sonam Kapoor	To promote her film Neerja
13	Kishwer Merchant	Guest Appearance
14	Imam A Siddique	As a guest for a week
14	Akshay Kumar & Nimrat Kaur	To promote their film Airlift
14	Aftab Shivdasani, Tushar Kapoor & Ekta Kapoor	To promote their film Kyaa Kool Hain Hum 3
14	Manish Paul	Guest Appearance
15	Sunny Leone	To promote her film Mastizaade
15	Gizele Thakral, Nora Fatehi & Yuvika Chaudhary	Guest Appearance
15	Mika Singh	Guest Appearance
Finale	Katrina Kaif & Aditya Roy Kapur	To promote their film Fitoor
Finale	Mouni Roy, Jigyasa Singh & Siddharth Nigam	Guest Appearances as Shivanya, Thapki & Ashoka
Finale	Bharti Singh, Krushna Abhishek, Anita Hassanandani, Puja Banerjee	Guests from Comedy Nights Bachao
Finale	Sidharth Shukla, Raghav Juyal, Mahhi Vij & Sana Saeed	To promote Fear Factor: Khatron Ke Khiladi 7

== Weekly summary ==
The main events in the house are summarized in the table below. A typical week begins with nominations, followed by the shopping task, and then the eviction of a Housemate during the Saturday episode. Evictions, tasks, and other events for a particular week are noted in order of sequence.

Week 1	Entrances	On Day 1, Digangana & Roopal, Kishwer & Aman, Rimi & Suyyash, Vikas & Yuvika, Rochelle & Prince, Mandana & Keith, Ankit & Arvind entered the house in pairs and were tied to each other.
Week 1	Nominations	Pairs have to mutually decide which pair they want to nominate. As a result, Ankit & Arvind, Digangana & Roopal, Rimi & Suyyash, Vikas & Yuvika were nominated for this week's eviction.
Week 1	Tasks	Phobia: On Day 2, the housemates were presented their first luxury shopping task. They had to face their phobias for a predetermined amount of time. Each pair had to challenge another pair to face a test.; Prince & Rochelle chose Digangana & Roopal to confront the fear of bellybuttons (Omphalophobia) by holding their face against a big belly until a klaxon sounds. Digangana & Roopal passed the task.; Keith & Mandana chose Ankit & Arvind to face the fear of balloons (Globophobia) where they had to inflate ten balloons until the balloon bursts. Ankit & Arvind passed the task.; Aman & Kishwer chose Vikas & Yuvika to face the fear of gaining weight (Obesophobia) by consuming all the provided food items within fifteen minutes. Vikas & Yuvika failed to complete the task in the given time.; Ankit & Arvind chose Rimi & Suyyash to confront the fear of becoming bald (Phalacrophobia) by removing all the hair from their head. Rimi & Suyyash quit before the task commenced.; Rimi & Suyyash chose Aman & Kishwer to face the fear of music (Melophobia) by playing a mouth organ place fixed in a fish's mouth until a klaxon sounds. Aman & Kishwar passed.; Vikas & Yuvika chose Aman & Kishwer to face the fear of hair (Trichophobia) by applying a facemask with hair as main constituent until a klaxon sounds. Aman & Kishwar passed.; Digangana & Roopal chose Rimi & Suyyash to confront the fear of needles (Trypanophobia) which involved getting a permanent tattoo saying Bigg Boss on their forearm. Rimi & Suyyash quit before the task commenced.
Week 1	Result	Passed
Week 1	Reward	The pair which performed the best in the task was automatically nominated by Bigg Boss for captaincy – Aman & Kishwer. Housemates nominated another pair to join them and chose Vikas & Yuvika. These two pairs competed against each other in a fight for house control.; Vikas as the new captain, alongside Yuvika, was allowed his suitcase.
Week 1	Exit	On Day 7, Ankit was evicted from the house after facing the public vote.
Week 2	Tasks	Lagaan: Kishwer and Aman were landlords and had to be against the other contestants. If they win they will be free from being tied up. Arvind is the umpire willthe rest of the housemates are workers. They had to sell grind flour to the landlords.
Week 2	Result	Passed – Aman & Kishwer
Week 2	Other Tasks	House Captaincy Task After Aman & Kishwer won the 'Laagan' task, they got an opportunity to perform and get a chance to win the captaincy task. All contestants were given a chance to support either Aman or Kishwer. Mandana was the referee. At the end Kishwar won the task and was the next captain of the house.
Week 2	Result	Passed – Kishwer
Week 2	Double Trouble Room	Aman & Kishwer both go to the room. Bigg Boss gave them two options to pick. They will tell their decision by pressing the button. First option is if one of them select it then whole house will be free from partnership. If both of them select it then whole house will be free from partnership but they will become partner again. If none of the two select it then one more pair of their choice will be in partnership, all other will be free. Aman had pressed the button and that all the housemates are free.
Week 2	Punishments	—N/a
Week 2	Exits	On Day 14, Roopal was evicted from the house after facing the public vote.
Week 3	Tasks	Friendspage Prince & Suyyash will be against each other. They have a fan page on the wall in the garden. They will update status and send friend request to inmates, inmates will provide support by becoming their friends and liking their status, if any inmate wanna change support then they will announce in camera and then change their side. Kishwer will supervisor of task and is not allowed to be on either side. The one who has the most friends will win the task and become captain while loser will be nominated directly. If rules are broken then Prince or Suyyash can block friends of the opposite sides, Kishwar can give her input when it comes to blocking, blocked user will wear street jacket and have to sit on chair placed in the garden. Prince's team: Aman, Arvind, Keith, Rochelle, Rimi, Yuvika Suyyash's team: Digangana, Mandana, Vikas
Week 3	Result	Winner – Prince
Week 3	Result	Failed – Suyyash
Week 3	Other Tasks	House Captaincy Task: Prince and Suyyash had to convince the other contestants to vote for them for House Captain. Prince became the winner while Suyyash was nominated for eviction for next week.
Week 3	Result	Winner – Prince
Week 3	Other Tasks	Shh! Kid Will Wake Up: Inmates will bear some hurdles in this task and they have to be silent for a while. If they make noise, then the kid will wake up. For first challenge of the task, one inmate will be chosen to do it. He or she will go in activity area and wear cap by using elastic strap, captain Prince will keep pulling and pushing that strap to hit neck of person till red light doesn't switches off there.; MANDANA: Prince had to hit her neck by moving the elastic band.; DIGANGANA: She had to face an ice bucket over her head.; KEITH: Prince had to hit a shoe on Keith's bottom.; ROCHELLE & VIKAS: Housemates had to throw balls on their face.; SUYYASH: Prince had to wax Suyyash's legs.; They won the luxury budget task.
Week 3	Double Trouble Room	Prince had to nominate three inmates who broke the rules many times. He nominated Mandana, Rochelle & Yuvika. All three went to the room and were given four options: 1) If any 1 of them presses the buzzer, the other 2 will have to face the punishment; 2) If 2 of them press the buzzer, the 3rd person will have to face the punishment; 3) If all 3 press the buzzer, they will have to choose 2 members from the house to face the punishment; 4) If no one presses the buzzer, they will have to choose 1 person in the house to face the punishment; Rochelle had pressed the buzzer hence making Mandana & Yuvika the servants and they got punished.
Week 3	Punishments	—N/a
Week 3	Exits	On Day 20, Arvind was evicted from the house after facing the public vote.; On Day 21, Vikas was evicted from the house after facing the public vote.
Week 4	Entrances	Rishabh Sinha entered as the first wild card entrant.; Puneet Vashist entered as the second wild card entrant.
Week 4	Tasks	Hotel BB9 Task: Mandana & Rishabh will be guests while the other housemates will be staff. Prince is the manager. Guests can ask anything and staff have to fulfill their wishes, Staff will keep trying to make guests happy with their serving while guests will keep showing non-satisfaction, guests can complain about services at complaint desk where one inmate should be present all the time, task will be continuously on at day and night, all bring things from store room for task. Sargun Mehta, VJ Andy, Ali Quli Mirza and Sana Khan came as guests as well for the task.
Week 4	Result	Winner – Mandana & Rishabh
Week 4	Result	Failed – Staff & Manager
Week 4	Other Tasks	House Captaincy Task: Mandana & Rishabh both had to fight and maintain their balance by standing on a plank placed over the pool. They will have to fight with padded poles and see to it that they don't fall into the pool.
Week 4	Result	Winner – Rishabh
Week 4	Result	Failed – Mandana
Week 4	Double Trouble Room	Inmates had to choose three names they thought did worst in the BB9 Hotel task. They chose Rimi, Rishabh, Mandana. Bigg Boss gave four options: 1): if one of you presses the button then other two will sleep without mattress on bed. 2): if two of them presses the button then the one who didn't push button will sleep without mattress. 3}: third option is that if all three presses the button then all inmates will have to sleep without mattress while three of them will sleep on beds 4): fourth option is that if none of them presses the button then all inmates will sleep without mattress, they have 5minutes to decide. They choose option three.
Week 4	Punishments	Prince gets nominated for next week after fighting with Rishabh.
Week 4	Exits	On Day 26, Keith made an emergency exit after hearing about his brother's demise.; On Day 28, Yuvika was evicted from the house after facing the public vote.
Week 5	Tasks	Highway Task Team B will sit on rickshaw and will have to move peddle/wheel all the time while Team A will try to put them down from rickshaw without using violence, Rickshaw will go in 4 different cities, there will sub-tasks in between main highway task, these will be in activity area and will happen time to time. Both teams will fight in sub-tasks, if Team A wins then they can choose one person from team B and he will have to leave rickshaw and task, he will be excluded from task, if team B wins then they can bring their excluded person again on rickshaw. This task will have an effect on captaincy and nominations, the one who is excluded from task, his picture should be put on photoboard placed in garden area. The teams are: TEAM A - Rishabh, Rochelle, Mandana, Aman and Digangana. TEAM B - Suyyash, Kishwer, Prince, Puneet and Rimi.
Week 5	Result	Task cancelled after Mandana kicked Kishwer and contestants damaging their mikes.
Week 5	Other Tasks	Bigg Boss's Got Talent: Both teams have to do dance, play and stand-up comedy. There will dance competition between Rochelle and Rimi. Both teams will show an incident happened in house as their skit. Puneet and Suyyash have to write and compose song which has essence of some incident happened in house. In Team A, Aman and Rishabh will show play where Rishabh will be his puppet. Prince and Mandana will be judges of this task. The teams are: Team A: Rishabh, Aman, Rochelle and Digangana Team B: Suyyash, Puneet, Kishwer and Rimi.
Week 5	Other Tasks	Winner – Both Teams
Week 5	Other Tasks	: Fear Task: One team member will stand and two inmates from other will put powder on his face to make it dirty while the inmate from his or her team will open boxes placed in garden one by one, there will be face wash in one of the box, he or she will have to wash face of inmates whose face has got smeared with powder, the inmate whose face is smeared cannot wash his face by himself nor can help other inmate who will fash his face. The teams are: Black team - Kishwer, Suyyash, Prince, Rimi and Digangana White team - Puneet, Rishabh, Mandana and Rochelle
Week 5	Result	Winner – White Team
Week 5	Result	Failed – Black Team
Week 5	Captaincy Task	Prince, Rochelle and Suyyash are required to protect themselves from getting painted by the other housemates with the help of a shield, they have to remain in circle while protecting themselves While the other housemates paint their t-shirts with a sponge placed on a stick, they have to stay inside a circle. As a rule, crossing the line would lead to disqualification, Rimi will be judge of task
Week 5	Result	Winner – Suyyash
Week 5	Result	Failed – Prince & Rochelle
Week 5	Double Trouble Room	—N/a
Week 5	Punishments	Mandana was nominated by Bigg Boss for next week after she kicked Kishwer during the Highway task.
Week 5	Exits	On Day 35, Puneet was evicted from the house after facing the public vote.
Week 6	Entrances	On Day 40, Kawaljit Singh entered as the third wild card entrant.
Week 6	Captaincy Task	The three chosen candidates: Kishwer, Prince and Rochelle, for the next captain have to hold a bowl of coloured water each, they are also to ensure that they maintain constant hand contact with the bowl and do not spill the water, in end the one whose bowl have more water than others will win the task, they have to hold bowl for 6hours, other inmates will support their favorite candidate and have to irritate candidate whom they don't want as captain, Suyyash will be supervisor of task.
Week 6	Result	Winner – Kishwer
Week 6	Result	Failed – Prince and Rochelle
Week 6	Other Tasks	BB Naughty Kids: Staff will have to handle and teach mischievous kids how to behave while kids will try to irritate staff by doing antics, Rimi will be supervisor of task and have to see who from staff lost their cool while handling kids, this task will affect nominations. Staff will have to make kids eat food, will have to take care of them and can also punish them if they don't listen. The teams are: Sanchalak: Rimi Team A: Rishabh, Kishwer, Prince and Rochelle will be mischievous kids, Team B: Mandana, Aman, Digangana and Suyyash will act as staff of day care centre.
Week 6	Other Tasks	Winner – Team A
Week 6	Other Tasks	Failed – Team B
Week 6	Other Tasks	: Secret Task: Mandana (who Rimi nominated as worst performer) is in the secret room. All housemates have to speak ill about Mandana so she can nominate two people to save.
Week 6	Result	Mandana chose to save Prince and Rochelle
Week 6	Double Trouble Room	—N/a
Week 6	Punishments	—N/a
Week 6	Twists	Rimi chose Mandana as the worst performer from the naughty kids task where after Bigg Boss informed that Mandana is evicted from the house. Later it was revealed that she entered the secret room.
Week 6	Exits	On Day 42, Aman was evicted from the house after facing the public vote.
Week 7	Entrances	On Day 43, Priya Malik entered as the fourth wild card entrant.
Week 7	Tasks	BB Dairy: Contestants are divided in two teams with Prince and Rimi being the team leads. Kishwer is appointed to be the moderator of the task. The two teams are required to milk an electronic cow with the help of three nozzles/pipes and have to make packets for final inspection. The milk packets will then go through a hygiene check by both teams' captains and the team processing maximum packets will be declared as the winner. The first order is of making 25 packets.; Sanchalak: Kishwer Prince's Team: Rochelle, Kawaljit and Rishabh Rimi's Team: Suyyash, Priya and Mandana
Week 7	Result	Winner – Prince's Team
Week 7	Result	Failed – Rimi's team
Week 7	Other Tasks	Money Money: The housemates will be given a bag connected with rope. Inmates have to hold the rope of their respective gunny bag, which they will have to hold on for 24 hours. Each of the bag had a different amount of sum in it. If at all the contestants drop the bag, that amount of money will be lost. The inmates who will keep holding bag till end, his bag's amount will be added to winner's prize which is right now 39 lacs. There are different amounts in each bag and that is written in envelope. Inmates will open that envelope after task only. Till then they do not know about amount in their bag. There is ‘X2’ in one bag. If the one whose bag have X2 holds the bag till end of task then the summed amount after task will be doubled (multiplied by 2 or x2). They do not know whose bag have it. Priya is moderator of task. Digangana will not be part of task as she is unwell.; Inmates come in garden and take their places and holds rope of bags. There is big LCD screen screen placed in garden too on which different things will be shown to inmates.
Week 7	Captaincy Task	All housemates need to secure pace inside a car and be stationed there. The one who survives till the end will be declared as the winner. Rimi, Digangana and Mandana will not be part of task, neither they can help other inmates in task, Mandana will be moderator of task. Priya won the task and got two weeks immunity and house captaincy.
Week 7	Double Trouble Room	—N/a
Week 7	Punishments	—N/a
Week 7	Twists	—N/a
Week 7	Exits	On Day 51, Rimi was evicted from the house after facing the public vote.
Week 8	Tasks	Paanch Dosh Ego: Housemates are required to battle their 5 fundamental emotions – Ego, Greed, Lust, Anger and Laziness. The first task is based on Ego, where the contestants are divided into two teams.; First team: Prince, Rochelle, Mandana, Keith Second team: Kishwer, Rishabh, Suyyash, Kawaljit Digangana will not take part in task due to illness. In ego task, Two individuals from each team are selected whose 3 personal belongings will be selected by other team, they will give it Priya who is moderator of task, Priya will destroy that belongings, three items are necessary to give, the selected inmate can deny to give 4th item, the winner will get the belongings back which devil took in money money task. Lust 5 vices” task second round, it is about lust. in this task, one inmate from both teams will be chosen, they have to control their heartbeat, they will be sent to activity room and whatever happens in front of them, their heartbeat will be measured according to that, in end of task, Priya will announce who controlled heartbeat more. Greed 3rd vice or sin that is “greed”, in this task, both teams will choose one inmate from their teams whom they think are most greedy. You and the chosen inmates will go to activity area, they will be given some option and their greed will be tested through it, the one who chooses option first will lose the task as he couldn't control his greed while the other one will win Anger the fourth sin’vices of task is “Anger”. Mandana and Rishab are sent to separate cages, opposite team have to irritate them, their anger will be tested, they should not get irritated with inmates antics against them, Priya will supervise task and will decide who controlled anger more nicely at end of task. Laziness The last and the fifth sin is “laziness or Sloth” for which Rochelle and Kanwaljit are elected. The swimming pool is turned into a swamp, there is filth in and its contaminated to make it marsh or swamp, these two contestants have to walk from one end to the other and cover maximum rounds of pool, the one who takes more rounds will win the task.
Week 8	Result	Winner – Ego: Kawaljit; Lust: Prince; Greed: Rochelle; Anger: Rishabh; Laziness: Rochelle
Week 8	Result	Overal Winner – Mandana's team
Week 8	Result	Failed – Ego: Mandana; Lust: Rishabh; Greed: Kawaljit; Anger: Mandana; Laziness: Kawaljit
Week 8	Result	Failed – Kishwer's Team
Week 8	Captaincy Task	—N/a
Week 8	Result	—N/a
Week 8	Double Trouble Room	—N/a
Week 8	Punishments	—N/a
Week 8	Twists	—N/a
Week 8	Exits	On Day 57, Digangana was evicted from the house after facing the housemates vote.
Week 9
Week 9	Entrances	On Day 58, Gizele Thakral and Nora Fatehi entered as the fifth and sixth wild card entrants.
Week 9	Tasks	BB Ghost House: There will be two teams in it one of ghosts and other of humans.; Sanchalak: Keith Ghosts: Priya, Kishwer, Kawaljit, Gizelle, Suyyash Humans: Prince, Rishabh, Mandana, Nora, Rochelle Keith will be moderator of task. Ghosts work is to divert attention of humans towards them while human's work will be to ignore them, this task will affect nominations and captaincy along with luxury budget.
Week 9	Result	Winner – Ghost Team
Week 9	Result	Failed – Human Team
Week 9	Other Tasks	Policy Bazaar: Keith and Rishabh will have to sell policy of other inmates, inmates will come to them one by one as customer and have to buy either policy of inmate offered by Arjun, Keith or by Rishabh.
Week 9	Result	Winner – Keith
Week 9	Result	Failed – Rishabh
Week 9	Captaincy Task	Keith and Suyyash will be tied by elastic rope and they have to run in opposite stretching rope, at other end there is buzzer placed, both have to touch the buzzer by running in opposite direction of rope tied to their bellies, there will be 3rounds in it, the one who will press buzzer for two times be winner and will become captain.
Week 9	Result	Winner – Keith
Week 9	Result	Failed – Suyyash
Week 9	Double Trouble Room	—N/a
Week 9	Punishments	—N/a
Week 9	Twists	—N/a
Week 9	Exits	On Day 63, Kawaljit was evicted from the house after facing the public vote.
Week 10	Entrances	—N/a
Week 10	Tasks	Murder Mystery: Next task is “murder mystery”, there will be detectives, killer and common people, the detective in task, if killer or detective are successful then there will be effect on captaincy while the people who will get killed will have effect on their nominations, they will decide as killer, detective or common man in confession, we will call you there, and you will have to open one box from many boxes and if you get: white pearl then common man blue pearl then detective red pearl then killer.: 1. To put 3 T-shirts of an inmate in complaint box.; 2. To instigate an inmates by putting toothpaste and garbage on his/her bed.; 3. To make one inmate kiss his cheek.; 4. To destroy food of someone and irritate him/her; 5. To make someone angry so much that he gives up and volunteers to get killed.
Week 10	Result	Winner – Prince & Rishabh
Week 10	Result	Failed – Rest of Housemates
Week 10	Other Tasks	Smart Fit Body: Inmates will have to pose in different positions of yoga. There will be three rounds.; in first round Sanchalak: Gizele & Kishwer Team 1: Nora, Rishabh, Mandana and Suyyash. Team 2: Prince, Keith, Rochelle and Priya
Week 10	Result	Winner – Team 2
Week 10	Result	Failed – Team 1
Week 10	Captaincy Task	They will have to form a team of girls. The girls will have to hold balloons in their hands via a thread and they may not bend their hand. Prince chooses Priya, Nora and Rochelle. Rishabh chooses Kishwer, Gizele and Mandana. The team which keeps holding the balloon until the end will become captain. Keith will be moderator.
Week 10	Result	Winner – Prince
Week 10	Result	Failed – Rishabh
Week 10	Double Trouble Room	Priya, Kishwer and Rishabh will each press or not press a button.; If one of them presses the button, then he or she will get stuff back while other two will not get it.; If two of them press the button, then the one who didn't press the button will get things.; If three of them press the button, then they will not get their things back, and each of them will have to give one more thing.; If none of them presses the button, then they will not get anything and one more inmate will have to give all his/her stuff to the big boss too.; Rishabh didn't press the button, so he got his protein shake whilst Kishwer and Priya didn't get their belongings back as they pressed a lot of buttons.
Week 10	Punishments	Bigg Boss takes away the housemates personal belongings as a punishment for not following the rules. To get it back, Prince, who is the captain, had to say who deserves to have it back and who is not. He chose Priya, Kishwer and Rishabh.
Week 10	Twists	—N/a
Week 10	Exits	On Day 70, there was no eviction as Shahrukh Khan and Kajol announced this. Salman Khan said that the nominated contestants remain the same from this week.
Week 11		
Week 11	Entrances	—N/a
Week 11	Tasks	Baazi: Bigg boss is giving them chance to increase prize money which they lost in luggage task, it will affect luxury budget and nominations too, Bigg boss will give them tasks time to time and they will have to play in pairs, pairs are: Rochelle-Rishabh Keith-Nora Mandana-Kishwer Suyyash-Priya Sanchalak - Gizele 1st Task: Bigg boss gives first task to pairs, they have to stand on poles. Prince will be in confession room and have to bet/guess which pair will remain standing on till end, if he guesses it right then prize money will be increased to 3lacs.; First task won by - Rochelle & Rishabh 2nd Task: Bigg boss gives them task in which each pair will have to fight with wrestler in ring, they don't have to fall out of ring to win game; Second task won by - Kishwer & Mandana 3rd Task: In this task, both pairs will have to give challenges to other team and other team have to perform them, if they are able to perform challenge then they will one point and if they are not able to perform then challenger team will get one point.; Third task won by - Suyyash & Priya
Week 11	Result	Winner – Rochelle-Rishabh, Kishwer-Mandana, Suyyash-Priya
Week 11	Result	Failed – Keith-Nora
Week 11	Other Tasks	Romote Control: In this task inmates will be controlled by remote control. Pause, play, rewind, fast forward will be said to them and they have to act like that only, Bigg boss will give them orders time to time and they have to stop everything they are working upon and have to follow Bigg boss's rules of remote control.
Week 11	Captaincy Task	In this task both contenders have to hold ring and the one who will keep holding ring till end will become captain, Prince will be moderator of task.
Week 11	Result	Winner – Suyyash
Week 11	Result	Failed – Mandana
Week 11	Double Trouble Room	—N/a
Week 11	Punishments	—N/a
Week 11	Twists	—N/a
Week 11	Exits	On Day 77, Gizele was evicted from the house after facing the public vote.
Week 12	Tasks	Jewel Thief: The housemates are divided into two teams –; the thieves team (Keith, Mandana, Nora and Rishabh) the police team (Rochelle, Prince, Kishwer and Priya) Suyyash is the supervisor of the task. There are diamonds laid out across the living area and the bedroom which the thieves team is required to steal them. The thieves team is given a secret room which the police team cannot enter. Here, the thieves team is given an order in which they need to steal the eight diamonds laid out in the house. If the police catch the thieves with diamonds and if they get suspicious about someone, they can arrest the thieves and put them in the jail. In this task, thieves have to steal diamonds as per list given to them, they have to steal diamonds in right order as per list.
Week 12	Result	Winner – Police team
Week 12	Result	Failed – Thief team
Week 12	Other Tasks	Season Nomination Task: Bigg Boss announces a Season Nomination task where the housemates have to pass a ‘Season Nomination’ trophy at the sound of a gong. Once the gong rings, they have to pass it on to any other contestant they believe is either their competition or not a part of the league. They will have only two minutes to do so and will also have to state a reason. When Bigg Boss will end of the task, at this point, whoever is holding the trophy, will be nominated for the rest of the season, task will go on for 6 hours.
Week 12	Other Tasks	Winner – Keith (nominated for whole season)
Week 12	Other Tasks	Joyful Selfie Task: Joyful Selfie task is launched and all housemates have to give Keith name of a family member or friend they would like to talk to outside the house and have convince him with the strongest reason. They then will take a selfie with Keith. Keith is required to judge them on fair grounds and announce the name of the contestant who deserves it to talk to their loved ones.
Week 12	Other Tasks	Winner – Mandana
Week 12	Captaincy Task	Inmates of house will tie themselves using belt to the contender whom they want to support, the one who will get more support will become captain.
Week 12	Result	Winner – Prince
Week 12	Result	Failed – Rochelle
Week 12	Double Trouble Room	Bigg boss says Kishwer, Priya and Rochelle will be given four options, they have to choose one, they are?; 1): If one inmate presses button then she will be saved from nominations and other two will be nominated and the one who has pressed button will nominate one inmate from house.; 2): If two inmates press button then the third one will be nominated and the one who pressed button will nominate one each.; 3): If three of them press button then they will be saved and all other inmates will be nominated.; 4): If none of them presses the button then whole house will nominated along with them.; The four inmates choose to save themselves while the whole house is nominated.
Week 12	Twists	—N/a
Week 12	Exits	On Day 83, Nora was evicted from the house after facing the public vote.; On Day 84, Suyyash was evicted from the house after facing the public vote.
Week 13	Tasks	Road To Finale Task: Bigg Boss announces the first task of the Road to Finale’ week, all inmates are provided with containers full of 400 kg of sand each, they have to prevent sand from falling off the container and save till the end of the task. The housemates are allowed to attack others and take out sand with the help of a lever placed at the bottom of the container or by other means. The three housemates who will have most number of sand left in their containers by the end of the task will move to the next level of the game, there is red mark near end of container, if sand gets less than the red mark in container then that inmate will be disqualified from task. Keith is nominated to for whole season so he won't be taking part in task and he will be supervisor of task, if someone breaks rules then he can take out as much as much he wants out from container.; In: Kishwer, Mandana, Priya, Prince, Rochelle and Rishabh: In the next stage of the game, the contestants are now required to leave their levers open from bottom and allow the sand to leave the container but at the same time, keep filling the container from the top. The three contestants with the most sand in their container after one hour will get the access to the next stage of the task, they can take out sand from other containers too in the process.; Winner: Prince, Kishwer and Mandana Out: Rochelle, Priya & Rishabh: Bigg Boss announces the next stage of the Road to Finale’ week, Priya reads it. This task is held in the garden area and Prince, Mandana and Kishwer have to enter designated fenced boxes where each one of them have assigned buzzer, they can't get anything to eat or drink, Rochelle is supervisor of task, task will start after buzzer plays. they will be given three options, depending on what they chose, they will win or lose the game, options are: a) The first one (out of the three) to press the buzzer will be out of the game and he/she will continue to stay in the house as a normal contestant. b) Whoever presses the buzzer second, will be out of the house, however he/she will receive a total sum of Rs.6,33,333 (six lacs thirty three thousand three hundred thirty three rupees). Priya claps at this, Rochelle is shocked listening this option. c) If the person presses the buzzer third i.e last then he/she will directly get the ‘ticket to the finale’.
Week 13	Result	Winner – Prince (he also became captain for next 2 weeks)
Week 13	Result	Failed – Mandana (quit the task) & Kishwer (forced to quit the show with money)
Week 13	Other Tasks	—N/a
Week 13	Captaincy Task	—N/a
Week 13	Double Trouble Room	—N/a
Week 13	Punishments	—N/a
Week 13	Twists	During the Finale Ka Week task, Bigg Boss announced that one from Kishwer and Prince will have to leave and forced to walk out of the house with the money while the other win or the prize money with decrease. After a day of thinking Kishwer decided to take the money.
Week 13	Exits	On Day 89, Kishwer walked out of the house with money and sacrificed the game for Prince during the ticket to finale task.; On Day 91 Salman Khan announced that there is no eviction due to Kishwer's exit.
Week 14	Entrances	On Day 92, Imam Siddiqui (BB6 contestant) entered as a guest for a week.
Week 14	Tasks	Make Imam Happy: Bigg boss gives task to inmates, “make Imam happy”, in this task, inmates have to make imam happy by doing things that he wants, he can ask anything he wants from you and you have to fulfil it, if you are not able to fulfill any task given by him then you can give genuine suggestion and leave task, if Imam is not happy then he can punish inmates too.; Ignore Imam: Task is given to people, task name is ‘ignore imam’, Imam will do things to irritate inmates and get reaction out of them, he can do anything to get their attention but if inmates give him reaction then they will be out of game.; Commander Imam: Bigg Boss introduces a new task, Commander Imam’. Through this task Imam has to command the house and get the housemates to follow discipline and order. All contestants have to abide by Imam's instructions and follow his rules. The entire house is converted into a boot camp and inmates are enthusiastic cadets of commander Imam, all the contestants have to perform the physical activities and push their limits to give their best in the task. Inmates will eat and drink after Imam's order, inmates to follow challenges given by Imam, Imam will give tasks and will make them workout as cadet.; Imam Ki Adalat: Bigg Boss introduces a task, Imam Ki AdalatI(imam's court), this task is the last chance for the housemates to prove their point as to why he or she deserves to become the first finalist. Imam Siddique is the judge and one by one the contestants have to face reality as Imam cross questions them and the other contestants toss allegations over them, Imam will decide in end who deserves to be finalist, the one who is nominated this week and becomes finalist, will still be nominated. Keith is nominated for the rest of the season and hence he won't be a part of this task.; Winner - Priya (she becomes first finalist) Excitement Reborn: There is one car parked in garden. There will be two teams in task.; Team A - Rishab, Priya and Mandana Team B - Keith, Rochelle and Prince one team member will be blindfolded and have to cross obstacles then second team member will do it then 3rd team member will go in pool after taking off mike and give key to Imam then go in car and play horn, the team which will do it fast will become winner.
Week 14	Result	Winner – Priya, Mandana and Rishabh
Week 14	Result	Failed – Keith, Rochelle and Prince
Week 14	Punishments	—N/a
Week 14	Twists	—N/a
Week 14	Exits	On Day 96, Priya was evicted from the house after facing the public vote.
Week 15	Tasks	BB Secret Task: Bigg Boss gives Rochelle a secret task and gives her in-ear headphones to follow the instructions. Further, Rochelle is hijacked by Sunny Leone and given a set of challenges to complete during the day, Sunny will direct her through in-earphones and will give her tasks time to time and will see her on-screen. Sunny gives first task to Rochelle to give kiss to all boys in house.
Week 15	Result	Winner – Rochelle
Week 15	Happenings	Day 98 : Bigg Boss asks the finalists to tell about how their journey in the house has been. Later Sunny Leone (BB5 contestant) came to give a task.; Day 99: Bigg boss gives task to inmates “silent disco”, in this task, there will be party in house in which at least two inmates should be wearing headphones and dancing in garden area till song plays, then other two will replace them. Ex contestants Gizele Thakral, Yuvika Chaudhary and Nora Fatehi entered. Later Bigg Boss asked the contestants who was the least entertaining in the task; they chose Rishabh. Later Bigg Boss decorated the house and the contestants had dinner.; Day 100: Tarot reader entered the house to read the future for the contestants.; Day 101: Bigg boss house door will be opened again and any two inmates will get chance to meet their fans outside house and can do vote appeal to them. Bigg boss gives task to inmates, the ‘Shikayate’(complaints) task where each person is allotted 3 test tubes filled with elixir that they have to protect at all times. When buzzer plays, he contestants have to ring the bell, the one who will ring bell first will get chance to empty one person's test tube after giving a valid reason for it or telling his complaint to that person. Two lucky people with maximum number of filled test tubes in end will get the golden opportunity to go outside the house and do a vote appeal to their fans. Inmates are allotted with different colors of elixir: Mandana-red elixir Rochelle-blue elixir Prince-yellow elixir Rishab-green elixir Winner - Rishabh and Rochelle.: Day 102: Mika Singh came to celebrate the last day in the house with contestants. RJ Malishka also came to interact with the finalists. She also gave task which all won and got a chance to enter the Bigg Boss cinema. Bigg Boss shows the four finalists Mandana, Prince, Rochelle and Rishabh's journey to them.; Day 103: Bigg Boss finale with Prince as the winner.
Week 15	Exit	On Day 100, Keith was evicted from the house after facing the public vote.
Week 15	Finalists	
Week 15	3rd runner-up	Rochelle Rao
Week 15	2nd runner-up	Mandana Karimi
Week 15	1st runner-up	Rishabh Sinha
Week 15	Winner	Prince Narula

== Nominations table ==
	Week 1	Week 2		Week 3	Week 4	Week 5		Week 6	Week 7	Week 8		Week 9	Week 10	Week 11	Week 12	Week 13		Week 14	Week 15		
	Week 1	Week 2		Week 3	Week 4	Day 28	Day 29	Week 6	Week 7	Day 52	Day 57	Week 9	Week 10	Week 11	Week 12	Day 85	Day 89	Week 14	Day 101	Day 104	
Nominees for Captaincy	No; Captain	Aman & Kishwer; Vikas & Yuvika		Aman; Kishwer	Prince; Suyyash	Mandana; Rishabh		Prince; Rochelle; Suyyash	Kishwer; Prince; Rochelle	Kawaljit; Kishwer; Prince; Priya; Rishabh; Rochelle; Suyyash			Keith; Suyyash	Prince; Rishabh	Mandana; Suyyash	Prince; Rochelle	Kishwer; Prince		—N/a		
House Captain	No; Captain	Vikas & Yuvika		Kishwer	Prince	Rishabh		Suyyash	Kishwer	Priya			Keith	Prince	Suyyash	Prince				No; Captain	
Captain's Nominations	No; Captain	Aman; Kishwer; Rimi; Rochelle	Not eligible	Rimi	Mandana	Rochelle; Rimi		Not eligible	Digangana; Rishabh	Digangana; Suyyash		Keith	Gizele; Mandana	No; Nominations	Not eligible	Priya; Rishabh	Won TTF	No; Nominations	No; Nominations	No; Captain	
Double Trouble Room Nominations	N/A	Aman; Kishwer		Mandana; Rochelle; Yuvika	Mandana; Rimi; Rishabh	N/A							Kishwer; Priya; Rishabh	N/A	Kishwer; Priya; Rochelle	N/A					
Vote to:	Evict		Evict / Save	Evict			Task	Save	Evict								TTF	None		WIN	
Prince	Suyyash; Rimi	Rimi; Rochelle; Keith; Mandana	Prince (to evict); Suyyash (to save)	Arvind; Aman	House; Captain	Puneet; Aman	Digangana	Safe	Mandana; Rimi	Not eligible	Digangana (to evict)	Rishabh; Mandana	Rishabh; Priya	House; Captain	Nominated	House; Captain				No; Nominations	Winner (Day 104)
Rishabh	Not In House				Not eligible	House; Captain		Not eligible	Rochelle; Kawaljit	Not eligible	Digangana	Rochelle; Prince	Suyyash; Rochelle	No; Nominations	Nominated	Kishwer; Prince	Lost; TTF	No; Nominations	No; Nominations	No; Nominations	1st runner-up (Day 104)
Mandana	Digangana; Roopal	Kishwer; Aman; Prince; Suyyash	Mandana (to evict); Keith (to save)	Digangana; Arvind	Rimi; Rochelle; Aman	Rimi; Kishwer	Not eligible	Prince; Rochelle (to save)	Rochelle; Prince	Not eligible	Suyyash	Suyyash; Kawaljit	Suyyash; Rochelle	No; Nominations	Nominated	Rishabh; Priya	Quit; TTF	No; Nominations	No; Nominations	No; Nominations	2nd runner-up (Day 104)
Mandana	Digangana; Roopal	Kishwer; Aman; Prince; Suyyash	Mandana (to evict); Keith (to save)	Digangana; Arvind	Rimi; Rochelle; Aman	Rimi; Kishwer	Not eligible	Secret Room (Days 38-39)	Rochelle; Prince	Not eligible	Suyyash	Suyyash; Kawaljit	Suyyash; Rochelle	No; Nominations	Nominated	Rishabh; Priya	Quit; TTF	No; Nominations	No; Nominations	No; Nominations	2nd runner-up (Day 104)
Rochelle	Suyyash; Rimi	Kishwer; Aman; Digangana; Roopal	Rimi (to evict); Rochelle (to save)	Arvind; Digangana	Rimi; Yuvika; Digangana	Puneet; Rimi	Not eligible	Safe	Mandana; Rimi	Not eligible	Digangana	Kawaljit; Rishabh	Rishabh; Priya	No; Nominations	Not eligible	Priya, Rishabh	Lost; TTF	No; Nominations	No; Nominations	No; Nominations	3rd runner-up (Day 104)
Keith	Digangana; Roopal	Kishwer; Aman; Prince; Suyyash	Mandana (to evict); Keith (to save)	Vikas; Digangana	Rimi; Yuvika; Kishwer	Walked (Day 26)				Not eligible	Digangana	Mandana; Kawaljit	House; Captain	No; Nominations	Nominated	Priya; Kishwer	Lost; TTF	No; Nominations	No; Nominations	Evicted (Day 101)	
Priya	Not In House									House; Captain			Suyyash; Rochelle	No; Nominations	Not eligible	Kishwer; Rochelle	Lost; TTF	No; Nominations	Evicted (Day 98)		
Kishwer	Ankit; Arvind	Mandana; Roopal; Digangana; Roopal	Aman (to evict); Kishwer (to save)	House; Captain	Aman; Rimi; Rochelle	Puneet; Rochelle	Not eligible	Not eligible	House; Captain	Not eligible	Digangana	Mandana; Rishabh	Rishabh; Priya	No; Nominations	Not eligible	Priya; Rochelle	Lost TFF & Took; Money	Walked with ₹15 Lakh (Day 89)			
Suyyash	Ankit; Arvind	Rimi; Rochelle; Keith; Mandana	Prince (to evict); Suyyash (to save)	Arvind; Digangana	Digangana; Rimi; Aman	Puneet; Rochelle	Not eligible	House; Captain	Mandana; Rimi	Nominated		Mandana; Rishabh	Rishabh; Priya	No; Nominations	Nominated	Evicted (Day 84)					
Nora	Not In House												Rishabh; Priya	No; Nominations	Nominated	Evicted (Day 83)					
Gizele	Not In House												Rochelle; Suyyash	No; Nominations	Evicted (Day 77)						
Kawaljit	Not In House								Rochelle; Rimi	Not eligible	Digangana	Keith; Rochelle	Evicted (Day 63)								
Digangana	Ankit; Arvind	Suyyash; Prince; Rimi; Rochelle	Roopal (to evict); Digangana (to save)	Arvind; Vikas	Rimi; Yuvika; Aman	Puneet; Aman	Not eligible	Not eligible	Rimi; Rochelle	Nominated		Evicted by Housemates (Day 57)									
Rimi	Ankit; Arvind	Kishwer; Aman; Digangana; Roopal	Rimi (to evict); Rochelle (to save)	Digangana; Arvind	Digangana; Rochelle; Aman	Rochelle; Aman	Not eligible	Not eligible	Kawaljit; Rishabh	Evicted (Day 51)											
Aman	Ankit; Arvind	Mandana; Roopal; Digangana; Roopal	Aman (to evict); Kishwer (to save)	Vikas; Arvind	Kishwer; Rimi; Yuvika	Kishwer; Suyyash	Not eligible	Not eligible	Evicted (Day 42)												
Puneet	Not In House					Kishwer; Digangana	Not eligible	Evicted (Day 35)													
Yuvika	Ankit; Arvind	House; Captain		Arvind; Rimi	Rimi; Digangana; Keith	Evicted (Day 28)															
Vikas	Ankit; Arvind	House; Captain		Arvind; Rochelle	Evicted (Day 21)																
Arvind	Vikas; Yuvika	Rimi; Rochelle; Suyyash; Prince	Not eligible	Vikas; Digangana	Evicted (Day 20)																
Roopal	Ankit; Arvind	Suyyash; Prince; Rimi; Rochelle	Roopal (to evict); Digangana (to save)	Evicted (Day 14)																	
Ankit	Vikas; Yuvika	Evicted (Day 7)																			
Notes	1	2	3	4	5,6	7,8	9	10,11	12	13	13,14	13	None	15	16	17		18	19,20	21,22	
Against Public Vote	Ankit; Arvind; Digangana; Roopal; Rimi; Suyyash; Vikas; Yuvika	Aman; Kishwer; Digangana; Roopal; Keith; Mandana; Prince; Suyyash; Rimi; Rochelle	Aman; Mandana; Prince; Rimi; Roopal	Arvind; Digangana; Mandana; Keith; Rimi; Vikas	Aman; Mandana; Digangana; Rimi; Suyyash; Yuvika	Aman; Digangana; Kishwer; ~~Prince~~; Puneet; Rochelle; Rimi		Aman; Digangana; Kishwer; Mandana; Rimi; Rishabh	Digangana; Mandana; Rochelle; Rimi; Rishabh	Digangana; Suyyash		Kawaljit; Keith; Mandana; Rishabh	Gizele; Mandana; Priya; Rishabh; Rochelle; Suyyash		Keith; Mandana; Nora; Prince; Rishabh; Suyyash	Keith; ~~Kishwer~~; Priya; Rishabh; Rochelle		Keith; Mandana; Priya; Rishabh; Rochelle	Keith; Mandana; Prince; Rishabh; Rochelle	Mandana; Prince; Rishabh; Rochelle	
Re-entered	None								Keith	None											
Secret Room	None							Mandana	None												
Walked	None				Keith	None										Kishwer		None			
Evicted	Ankit	Roopal		Arvind	Yuvika	Puneet		Aman	Rimi	Digangana		Kawaljit	Eviction postponed	Gizele	Nora	No; Eviction		Priya	Keith	Rochelle	Mandana
Evicted	Ankit	Roopal		Arvind	Yuvika	Puneet		Aman	Rimi	Digangana		Kawaljit	Eviction postponed	Gizele	Nora	No; Eviction		Priya	Keith	Rishabh	Sumit
Evicted	Ankit	Roopal		Vikas	Yuvika	Puneet		Aman	Rimi	Digangana		Kawaljit	Eviction postponed	Gizele	Suyyash	No; Eviction		Priya	Keith	Rishabh	Sumit

The colors are used to denote the pairs used for nomination in week 1 & 2. They are not necessarily associated to a certain pair.

indicates that the Housemate was directly nominated for eviction.
indicates that the Housemate was immune prior to nominations.
indicates the winner.
indicates the first runner up.
indicates the second runner up.
indicates the third runner up.
indicates the contestant has been evicted.
indicates the contestant walked out due to emergency.
indicates the contestant has been ejected.
house captain.
indicates the contestant is nominated.

=== Nomination notes ===
- ^1: Housemates entered the house in seven pairs. Each pair nominated another pair with consensus when called into the confession room. Vote against a pair added one vote against each individual in the respective pair. Housemates therefore faced eviction individually.
- ^2: Pairings were revised prior to this week's nominations.
- ^3: Each pair had to nominate two pairs for eviction. After nominations, the pairs with the most votes were revealed. Each of those pairs had to then decide among themselves which one of them would voluntarily put themselves up for eviction saving the other. Vikas and Yuvika were saved as they were the first house captains of the season.
- ^4: After being nominated as the worst performers for the 'Lagaan' task, Keith and Mandana were nominated for eviction for week 3.
- ^5: After failing the 'Friendspage' task in week 3, Suyyash was nominated for the following week.
- ^6: Keith walked out of the house after a family emergency on day 26.
- ^7: After winning the 'BB Hotel' task successfully, Mandana and Rishabh were safe from the following week nominations.
- ^8: After failing the 'BB Hotel' task, Prince was nominated for eviction in the following week.
- ^9: After winning the immunity task, Prince was saved while he swapped his place with Digangana where she is nominated this week instead.
- ^10: Mandana was nominated for week 6 after kicking Kishwer during the 'Highway' task. Varun was also nominated directly for
- ^11: Mandana was told the she was evicted after Rimi named her as the worst performer in 'BB Naughty Kids' task. However, she was not evicted but sent to secret room. It was told to the housemates that she is not evicted and to make her angry all have to say bad things behind her back so she can nominate two housemates but in reality the two will be saved while the rest will be nominated for eviction. After re-entry Mandana saved Prince and Rochelle.
- ^12: Keith re-entered the house on day 48 as a surprise birthday present for Rochelle.
- ^13: Priya won the immunity task as was the new captain for the next two weeks.
- ^14: Digangana was evicted after the housemates voted her out while Suyyash were saved.
- ^15: The week 10 nominations were carried forward for week 11 after there was no eviction.
- ^16: After the Double Trouble Room, All Housemates were nominated except for Kishwer, Priya and Rochelle.
- ^17: On Day 89, Kishwer left the house with the bag of money which contained 15 Lakh whilst Prince won the Ticket To Finale task.
- ^18: On Day 98, After being the second finalist, Priya got evicted from the show.
- ^19: After Priya's eviction, All housemates were nominated for mid-eviction.
- ^20: On Day 101, There was a mid eviction where both Keith and Rochelle were in the bottom two. At the end, Keith became the last housemate to get evicted before the grand finale.
- ^21: After Keith's evicton, the season saw its five finalists, Mandana, Prince, Rishabh and Rochelle.
- ^22: On Day 104 on its grand finale, Prince Narula was announced as the winner whilst Rishabh Sinha became as first runner-up.
