= Tamburo (film) =

- Directed by: Shailesh Shankar
- Screenplay by: Sumit Bonkar; Rahul Yashod
- Produced by: Rohit Shetty; Shailesh Sanghvi S3
- Starring: Manoj Joshi; Bharat Chawda; Pratik Gandhi; Rita Bhaduri; Ojas Rawal; Jayesh More; Hemang Dave; Prasad Barve; Ayush Jadeja; Janki Bodiwala
- Edited by: Pankaj Hurne
- Music by: Shailes; Dharmik; Mehul (Sdm)
- Production company: AUROUS AVATAR ENTERTAINMENT
- Release date: 18 August 2017
- Running time: 110 minutes
- Country: India
- Language: Gujarati

Tamburo is an Indian Gujarati comedy film directed by Shailesh Shankar. It stars Bollywood veteran actor Manoj Joshi, and Pratik Gandhi, with Bharat Chawda.

== Plot ==
The plot revolves around three P’s – Paisa, Property & Pyaar. Hardik and Bhavik, friends for life are ambitious young men who dream of becoming wealthy quickly and effortlessly. In their quest for easy money, a twist of fate ensures that the duo find themselves embroiled in a situation that sets a chain reaction where the Mafia, the Police and the Gamblers are all on a hilarious chase after them.

== Cast ==
- Manoj Joshi as Kirit Bhai
- Bharat Chawda as Hardik
- Pratik Gandhi as Bhavik
- Ojas Rawal as Sultan
- Jayesh More as Sanjay Hegde
- Hemang Dave as Kalpesh
- Prasad Barve as Chirag
- Ayush Jadeja as Manya
- Janki Bodiwala as Dimple
- Priiya Nair as Nidhi

== Track listing ==
The Soundtrack was released by Red Ribbon Entertainment.

Track #	Song	Singer	Music	Length
1	Tamburo	Arvind Vegda	Shailesh Suvarna and Monty Khattar	2:22
2	Aa Che Party	Freedom Sharma and Mohit Pathak	Vishal J Singh and Shailesh Suvarna	2:08
3	No Control	Srishti Bhandari	Dharmik Samani	2:50
4	Unbreakable	Hariharan (singer) and Shannon Donald	Sameer Saptiskar	4:01

== Release ==
The film was released in Gujarat and Maharashtra on 18 August 2017.
