= Rishabh Sinha =

Indian actor

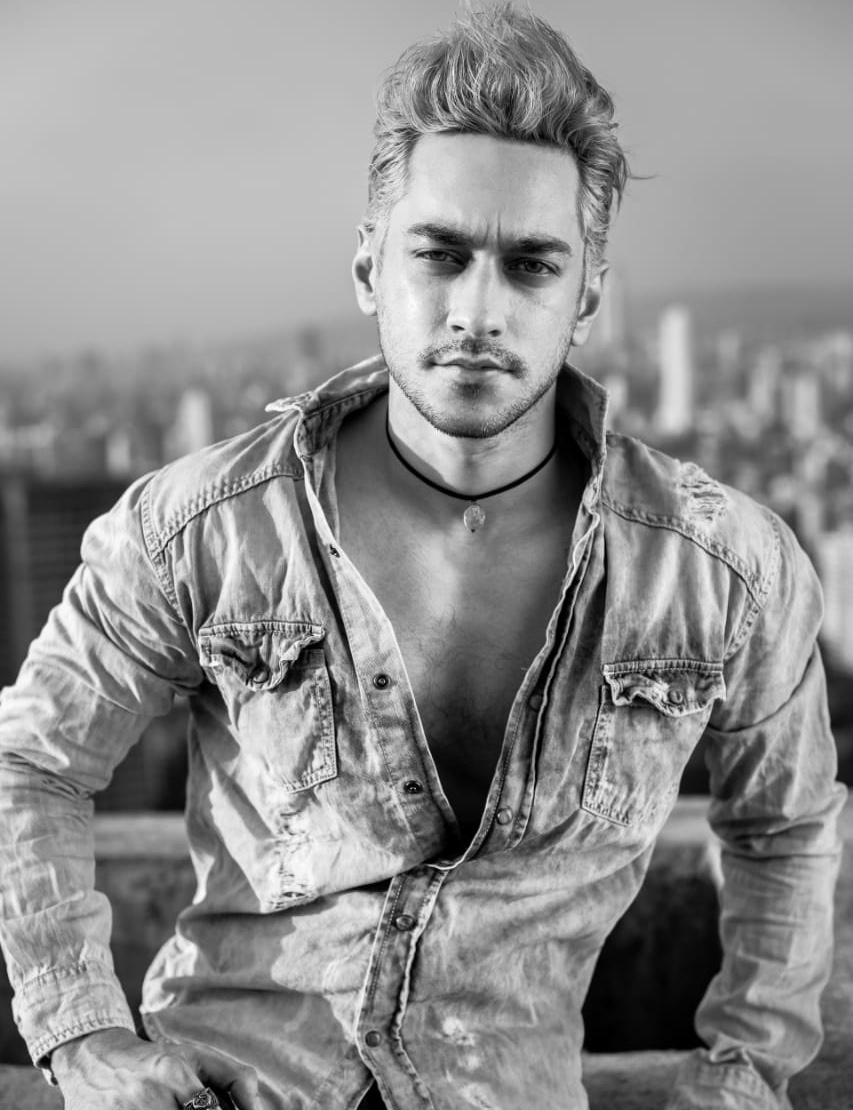
- Occupation: Actor
- Known for: Bigg Boss 9 MTV Splitsvilla; Qubool Hai

Rishabh Sinha is an Indian actor. He is known for playing the role of Ayaan Ahmed Khan in Qubool Hai, participating in MTV Splitsvilla and Bigg Boss 9. He also played a negative role in the movie Kaanchi: The Unbreakable.

== Filmography ==
Year	Title	Role	Language	Refs
2014	Kaanchi: The Unbreakable	Sushant Kakra	Hindi	
2020	Unlock	Anubhav	Hindi	

=== Television ===
Year	Title	Role	Notes	Ref
2012	MTV Splitsvilla 5	Contestant	(4th place)	
2014	MTV Splitsvilla 7	Contestant	(10th place)	
2012–13	Qubool Hai	Ayaan Ahmed Khan		
2015–16	Bigg Boss 9	Contestant	(1st runner-up)	
