= Vash (film) =

2023 Indian film by Krishnadev Yagnik

- Theatrical release poster
- Directed by: Krishnadev Yagnik
- Written by: Krishnadev Yagnik
- Produced by: Kalpesh Soni; Krunal Soni; Nilay Chotai; Dipen Patel
- Starring: Hitu Kanodia; Niilam Paanchal; Janki Bodiwala; Aaryab Sanghvi; Hiten Kumar
- Cinematography: Azwad Bhuiyan
- Edited by: Shivam Bhatt
- Music by: Kedar and Bhargav
- Production companies: KS Entertainment; Ananta Business Corp; Patel Processing Studios; Big Box Series Production
- Distributed by: Panorama Studios
- Release date: 17 February 2023
- Running time: 117 minutes
- Country: India
- Language: Gujarati

Vash is a 2023 Indian Gujarati-language supernatural psychological horror film written and directed by Krishnadev Yagnik. It stars Janki Bodiwala, Hitu Kanodia, Niilam Paanchal, Hiten Kumar in the lead roles. The plot follows a family, whose nightmare begins when a stranger enslaves their daughter with dark magic. It was released on 17 February 2023 in theatres.

The film received generally positive reviews. At the 71st National Film Awards, Vash won the Best Gujarati Feature Film Award and the Best Actress in a Supporting Role for Bodiwala.

== Plot ==
Atharva, a pilot from Ahmedabad, takes his wife, Beena, and their children, Aarya and Ansh, on a vacation to a remote village. During their stay, they encounter Pratap, a stranger who provides assistance, which Atharva initially questions before accepting.

Pratap uses hypnotism and black magic to control and manipulate Aarya. Aarya begins exhibiting unusual and violent behaviors, acting against her will under Pratap's instructions.

Atharva discovers that Pratap is a black magician seeking to capture Aarya. During a confrontation, Aarya pushes her brother Ansh from a terrace, severely injuring him. The family allows Pratap to leave with Aarya while Beena drives away with Ansh to seek medical help. Beena and Ansh die following a vehicular collision.

Atharva tracks Pratap to an abandoned temple where he is with several other girls under his hynotic control. Pratap commands his spell-bound victims to attack Atharva. After being injured by the hypnotised girls, Atharva requests Pratap to be killed by Aarya only. An over-confident Pratap deciding to grant Atharva's request commands the girls to stop attacking Atharva. While Pratap was commanding the girls, to block Pratap's vocal commands, Atharva uses a pair of scissors to deafen Aarya. Pratap is shocked to find it and taking opportunity of this, Atharva renders Pratap unconscious for a while and uses pliers to sever Pratap's tongue, which strips him of his ability to command his victims.

Ten years later, Atharva visits an isolated location where he has imprisoned Pratap and regularly tortures him with the same ordeal he made Aarya go through. Atharva confronts Pratap regarding his loss of power. Pratap begs to be killed, but Atharva refuses. Atharva leaves food for Aarya, who is still under a mental influence.

== Cast ==
- Hitu Kanodia as Atharva
- Niilam Paanchal as Beena, Atharva's wife
- Janki Bodiwala as Aarya, Atharva and Beena's daughter
- Aaryan Sanghvi as Ansh, Atharva and Beena's son
- Hiten Kumar as Pratap

== Release ==
=== Theatrical ===
Vash was theatrically released on 17 February 2023 in Gujarat. It was previously set to be released on 10 February 2023.

=== Home media ===
The film was premiered on 26 April 2024 on ShemarooMe.

== Reception ==
=== Critical reception ===
The film received positive reviews from critics. Shilpa Bhanushali of Mid-Day gave the film 4 out of 5 stars, writing, "Keeping the audience under a spell of fear with the flavor of Gujarati style, this film is worth watching, but you have to think how much risk you are willing to take". Deepali Chhatwani of The Times of India gave the film 3.5 stars out of 5 and wrote "But it is good to see how the director has kept his team and actors consistent in his last few releases. That rapport with the actors and working with the same team probably helps in understanding the director’s vision and delivering a good film". Dharmendra Thakur of Dainik Jagran gave the film 4 stars out of 5 and wrote "Music is the plus point of this film. The action sequences and cinematography of the film are also strong. From story, acting, direction and cinematography to music, Bahu is one. This film is going to set a new benchmark in Gujarati cinema." He noted, however, that the later Hindi remake achieved greater commercial success.

== Accolades ==
At 71st National Film Awards, Vash won the Best Gujarati Feature Film Award as well as the Best Actress in a Supporting Role for Bodiwala.

== Remake and sequel ==
The film was remade in Hindi as Shaitaan (2024) directed by Vikas Bahl and starring Ajay Devgn, R. Madhavan, and Jyothika. Janki Bodiwala and Anngad Raaj played their daughter and son in the remake. The film was released on 8 March 2024 to positive reviews and became commercially successful.

A sequel titled Vash Level 2 was released on 27 August 2025.
