= Ilu Ilu =

2025 film directed by Ravi Sachdev

- Official Poster
- Directed by: Ravi Sachdev; Parth Shukla
- Written by: Bhavik Bhojak
- Produced by: Ravi Sachdev; Bhavik Bhojak; Hardik Bhojak; Kanishk Tejura; Akash Desai
- Starring: Bhavik Bhojak; Khushbu Trivedi; Nisarg Trivedi; Sonali Lele Desai; Hemang Dave
- Cinematography: Ravi Sachdev
- Edited by: Ravi Sachdev
- Music by: Rutvij Joshi
- Production companies: Siddhi Vinayak Films & Entertainment; Ravi Sachdev Filmz
- Distributed by: Rupam Entertainment Pvt Ltd
- Release date: 14 February 2025
- Running time: 122 Min
- Country: India
- Language: Gujarati

Ilu Ilu is a 2025 Indian Gujarati romantic, comedy, family drama film directed by Ravi Sachdev and Parth Shukla, written by Bhavik Bhojak and co-written by Maulin Parmar. It stars Bhavik Bhojak, Khushbu Trivedi, Nisarg Trivedi, Sonali Lele Desai, Hemang Dave, Firoz Irani, Archan Trivedi, and others. The film is produced by Ravi Sachdev, Bhavik Bhojak, Hardik Bhojak, Kanishk Tejura and Akash Desai.

== Plot ==
When it was time of Kevin and Riya's Wedding, Kevin's Father and Riya's Mother runs away. A 26 year old romantic love story, which revolves around 2 passionate lovers, who gets departed because of the caste and financial situations of their families then. Who now, after these many years meet again accidentally for their children's wedding. Being unaware about the past, both tries to talk to each other but due to unavoidable circumstances they are unable to talk. Kevin and Riya are ready for marriage and everything is set while Kevin's Father and Riya's Mother went missing, but one innocent child saw both of them running and so the roller coaster of comedy starts. Ila and Ilesh goes somewhere distant to the chaos, but unaware to their missing complaint which Kevin and Riya has made, they decides to go back to town. But before that they meet with an accident which lead all, rushing to hospital and then, again the beautiful love story of Ila and Ilesh starts with their past. Moving on, both families decide to cancel Kevin's and Riya's Marriage and Home gets devastated but as we say, All's well that ends well Riya and Kevin gets married and Ila and Ilesh also live together.

== Cast ==
- Bhavik Bhojak as Kevin / Young Ilesh
- Pooja Bhat as Young Ila
- Khushbu Trivedi as Riya
- Nisarg Trivedi as Ileshbhai
- Sonali Lele Desai as Ila Ben
- Hemang Dave as Chhagan
- Archan Trivedi as Ramesh
- Firoz Irani as Mulchand Sheth
- Chetan Daiya as PI Jadeja
- Pralay Rawal as Kaka
- Kalpesh Patel as Kalpeshbhai
- Manisha Narkar as Parulben
- Dhruvika Kachwala as Champa Mami
- Maulik Chauhan as Pranav Goswami
- Amit Mishra as Kanti bhai
- Maddy Kava as Suresh Makwana
- Visv Patgir as Lalo
- Tapan Prajapati as Young Ramesh
- Parmeshwar Sirsikar as Advocate Mirchandani

== Production ==
The film was shot in different places across Gujarat. The music was composed by Rutvij Joshi, with lyrics written by Bhavik Bhojak and Swaggy The Rapper. The production completed in October 2023.

== Marketing and releases ==
The film's release date was announced on 4 January 2025. The official poster was revealed on 27 January 2025, followed by the teaser launch on 29 January 2025. The official trailer of the film was released on 6 February 2025. The film released on 14 February 2025, coinciding with Valentine's Day.

== Reception ==
A review at Film Information was very mixed, finding, for example, direction "average" but background music "appealing". A review by Jyothi Venkatesh at Filmy Town was critical of the lack of plausible plot.

== See also ==
- List of Gujarati films of 2025
