= Bhalle Padharya =

2024 film directed by Maniesh Kumar Madhav

- Official Poster
- Directed by: Maniesh Kumar Madhav
- Written by: Maniesh Kumar Madhav; Maulik Arvind Vekariya
- Produced by: Puja N Madhav; Durgesh Tanna; Garima Nandu; Dev Rao Jadhav
- Starring: Bharat Chawda; Prem Gadhavi; Saurabh Rajyaguru
- Cinematography: Jay Kulkarni
- Edited by: Dev Rao Jadhav
- Music by: Shantanu Dutta
- Production companies: MADSUN Films; DB Talkies
- Distributed by: Rupam Entertainment Pvt Ltd
- Release date: 11 October 2024
- Running time: 118.00 minutes
- Country: India
- Language: Gujarati

Bhalle Padharya is a 2024 Gujarati horror comedy directed by Maniesh Kumar Madhav and written by Maniesh Kumar Madhav & Maulik Arvind Vekariya. It stars Bharat Chawda, Prem Gadhavi Saurabh Rajyaguru and others. The film is produced by Puja N Madhav and Co Produced by Durgesh Tanna, Garima Nandu & Dev Rao Jadhav. The film will be distributed by Rupam Entertainment Pvt Ltd.

== Plot ==
Three friends plan a trip to a jungle theme resort for a birthday celebration. They continue on their journey overlooking all the bad omens. Through their journey they meet different characters, leading them to a strange village. A village that lives by the night and disappears by day... a cursed village that's township to ghosts and spirits waiting for their salvation.

== Cast ==
- Bharat Chawda as Abhishek
- Prem Gadhavi as Sanjay
- Saurabh Rajyaguru as Ronit
- Ragi Jani as Dholi Mama
- Kajal Vashisht as Jamku
- Kaushambi Bhatt as Sarita
- Vaishakh Ratanben as Pramod
- Harshida Pankhaniya as Maya
- Nilesh Brahmbhatt as Soori Baba
- Chetan Daiya as Truck Driver

== Production ==
The film was shot at various locations in Gujarat.

== Marketing and releases ==
The first look announced on September 23, 2024, and official trailer of the film released on September 25, 2024. The first song Mayadu Manvi released on October 2, 2024, by Panorma Music Gujarati. It is set to hit the cinemas on October 11, 2024.

== See also ==
- List of Gujarati films of 2024
