= Shaitaan (2024 film) =

2024 Indian film by Vikas Bahl

- Theatrical release poster
- Directed by: Vikas Bahl
- Written by: Aamil Keeyan Khan
- Story by: Krishnadev Yagnik
- Based on: Vash by Krishnadev Yagnik
- Produced by: Ajay Devgn; Vikas Bahl; Jyoti Deshpande; Abhishek Pathak; Kumar Mangat Pathak
- Starring: Ajay Devgn; R. Madhavan; Jyothika; Janki Bodiwala; Anngad Raaj
- Cinematography: Sudhakar Reddy Yakkanti
- Edited by: Sandeep Francis
- Music by: Amit Trivedi
- Production companies: Jio Studios; Devgn Films; Panorama Studios
- Distributed by: Panorama Studios
- Release date: 8 March 2024
- Running time: 132 minutes
- Country: India
- Language: Hindi
- Budget: ₹60−65 crore
- Box office: ₹211.06 crore

Shaitaan (transl. Devil) is a 2024 Indian Hindi-language supernatural psychological horror film directed by Vikas Bahl and produced by Devgn Films, Jio Studios, and Panorama Studios. It stars Ajay Devgn, R. Madhavan, Jyothika, Janki Bodiwala, and Anngad Raaj.

An adaptation of the 2023 Gujarati film Vash which also starred Bodiwala, Shaitaan revolves around a family which finds trouble when their daughter falls under the spell of black magic cast by a stranger, and they set out to stop the possession and uncover the stranger's motives. The film was officially announced in May 2023, and was entirely shot within the next three months in Dehradun and London. This is Jyothika's comeback to Bollywood since her debut film Doli Saja Ke Rakhna (1998).

Shaitaan was theatrically released on 8 March 2024, coinciding with Maha Shivaratri, to positive reviews from critics, with particular praise going towards the performances of Devgn, Madhavan and Bodiwala. Grossing ₹211.06 crore worldwide on an estimated budget of ₹60-65 crore, the film ranks as the fifth highest-grossing Hindi film of 2024. A sequel is in the scripting stage.

== Plot ==
Kabir Rishi, a devoted family man and successful chartered accountant from Dehradun, looks forward to a vacation with his wife, Jyoti, and their children, Janhvi and Dhruv. Seeking peace and family bonding, they travel to their remote farmhouse in the wilderness.

Their tranquility is interrupted by Vanraj Kashyap, a charismatic but mysterious traveler who appears stranded nearby. After offering assistance and gaining the family's trust, Vanraj is welcomed into their home by Kabir, who suspects nothing unusual.

The family's security soon collapses when Janhvi begins displaying disturbing behavior, becoming withdrawn, aggressive, and increasingly violent toward her younger brother, Dhruv. Unable to explain her sudden transformation, Kabir and Jyoti discover that Vanraj practices ancient black magic and uses hypnotic manipulation to control others.

Vanraj reveals his intention to use Janhvi as a vessel to spread his twisted philosophy of eliminating free will. As his control over her strengthens, he destroys the family's communication devices, leaving them isolated and turning their daughter against them. Their attempt to contact the police fails when Vanraj threatens Janhvi's life and forces her to act under his command.

With no way to protect her, Kabir and Jyoti are forced to surrender Janhvi to Vanraj. Refusing to abandon his daughter, Kabir sets out to find him. His search leads to a hidden ritual chamber deep in the forest, where Vanraj is preparing dozens of hypnotized young girls, including Janhvi, for a mass sacrificial ceremony. The ritual is intended to grant him the ability to hypnotize anyone without external assistance.

Kabir confronts Vanraj in a brutal and emotionally charged battle. Realizing that Vanraj's power depends on his voice and spoken incantations, Kabir cuts off his tongue, severing his control over Janhvi and the other girls. He then plays a doctored audio recording assembled from Vanraj's previously recorded statements, breaking the spell and freeing the children.

A year later, the Rishi family appears to have returned to normal life, although the trauma continues to affect them. In the final scene, Kabir visits a heavily secured underground chamber where Vanraj is imprisoned, mute, powerless, and regularly tormented. Kabir reminds him that true strength lies not in controlling others but in love, sacrifice, and a parent's determination to protect their children. He then leaves Vanraj screaming in pain and anguish.

== Cast ==
- Ajay Devgn as Kabir Rishi
- R. Madhavan as Vanraj Kashyap
- Jyothika as Jyoti Rishi
- Janki Bodiwala as Jahnvi Rishi
- Anngad Raaj as Dhruv Rishi

== Production ==
=== Development ===
Hindi remake of the Gujarati horror film Vash (2023) was announced in May 2023 with Ajay Devgn in the lead role, to be directed by Vikas Bahl, while the title Shaitaan was confirmed in January 2024. R. Madhavan was cast as the antagonist and Jyothika as Devgn's wife, both having previously starred in Dumm Dumm Dumm (2001), Priyamaana Thozhi (2003), and Magalir Mattum (2017), along with Jyothika's return to Hindi films after 25 years. Janki Bodiwala and Anngad Raaj were signed to play the children; the former reprises her role from Vash. It marks Bodiwala's debut in Hindi cinema.

=== Filming ===
The film was shot in London, Mumbai and Mussoorie with filming taking place from June 2023 to September 2023.

== Soundtrack ==
The music of the film is composed by Amit Trivedi and the lyrics are written by Kumaar. The first single titled "Khushiyaan Bator Lo" was released on 15 February 2024. The second single titled "Aisa Main Shaitaan" was released on 29 February 2024. The third single "Shaitaan Theme" was released on 8 March 2024. The fourth single "Papa Tu Hai Naa" was released on 2 April 2024 after release.

Shaitaan

Soundtrack album by Amit Trivedi
- Released: 4 April 2024
- Recorded: 2023–2024
- Genre: Feature film soundtrack
- Length: 13:10
- Language: Hindi
- Label: Panorama Music

All lyrics are written by Kumaar; all music is composed by Amit Trivedi.

Track listing
No.	Title	Singer(s)	Length
1.	"Shaitaan Theme"	Siddharth Basrur	2:34
2.	"Aisa Main Shaitaan"	Raftaar	2:58
3.	"Khushiyaan Bator Lo"	Jubin Nautiyal	3:32
4.	"Papa Tu Hai Na"	Sireesha Bhagavatula	4:06
Total length:			13:10

== Release ==
=== Theatrical ===
Shaitaan was theatrically released on 8 March 2024, coinciding with Maha Shivaratri.

=== Home media ===
The film premiered on Netflix on 1 May 2024.

== Reception ==
=== Box office ===
Shaitaan grossed ₹1.78 billion (US$19 million) in India and a further ₹331 million (US$3.5 million) in overseas markets, for a worldwide total of ₹2.11 billion (US$23 million).

=== Critical response ===
Shaitaan received positive reviews from critics, with particular praise going towards the performances of Devgn, Madhavan and Bodiwala. On the review aggregator website Rotten Tomatoes, 40% of 15 critics' reviews are positive, with an average rating of 5.3/10.

Bollywood Hungama gave 4/5 stars and wrote "Shaitaan is a nail-biting thriller laced with superlative performances and clapworthy climax that keeps you engaged". Dhaval Roy of The Times of India gave the film 3.5/5 and wrote "Even though Shaitaan’s narrative stumbles at times, the masterful use of atmosphere and top-notch acting elevate it into an unsettling experience worth having".

Sana Farzeen of India Today gave the film 2.5/5 and wrote "Shaitaan falls short, probably cursed by a weak script and the pressure of helming a remake". Lachmi Deb Roy of Firstpost rated 2.5 out of 5 and opined "Shaitaan could have been a good supernatural thriller, which we haven’t seen much in Hindi cinema of late, but it turned out to be a complete mess in the process of depicting the war of good vs evil. It’s a poorly made remake and the story is just not believable. Making the hero win at the end makes the film just too predictable". Saibal Chatterjee of NDTV gave the film 1.5/5 and wrote "Jyothika is the only one in the cast who is able to rise a bit above the sheer absurdity of the proceedings. The two male characters and the actors playing them don't stand a chance".

== Spin-off ==
A spinoff titled Maa starring Kajol was released on 27 June 2025.

== Accolades ==
Year	Award	Category	Nominee/Work	Result	Ref.
2025	25th IIFA Awards	Best Film	Shaitaan	Nominated	
2025	25th IIFA Awards	Best Supporting Actress	Janki Bodiwala	Won	
2025	25th IIFA Awards	Best Performance in a Negative Role	R. Madhavan	Nominated	
2025	Showsha Reel Awards 2025	Best Supporting Actress – Popular Choice	Jyothika	Nominated	
2025	70th Filmfare Awards	Best Supporting Actress	Janki Bodiwala	Nominated	
2025	70th Filmfare Awards	Best Supporting Actor	R. Madhavan	Nominated	
2025	70th Filmfare Awards	Best Adapted Screenplay	Aamil Keeyan Khan	Nominated	
