= Janki Bodiwala =

Indian actress (born 1995)

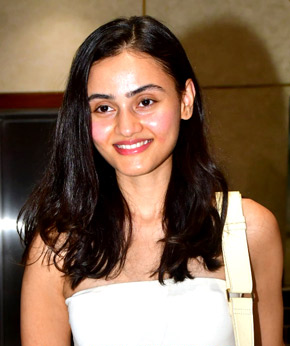
- Bodiwala in 2025
- Born: 30 October 1995 (age 30); Ahmedabad, Gujarat, India
- Occupation: Actress
- Years active: 2015–present

Janki Bodiwala (born 30 October 1995) is an Indian actress who predominantly works in Gujarati films. She is known for Chhello Divas (2015), Chhutti Jashe Chhakka (2018), Naadi Dosh (2022), and Vash (2023). She made her Hindi debut with Shaitaan in 2024.

== Early life ==
Bodiwala was born on 30 October 1995 in Ahmedabad to Bharat and Kashmira Bodiwala. She has a brother Dhrupad Bodiwala. She has done her schooling from M K Secondary & Higher Secondary School, Ahmedabad. She graduated with a Bachelor of Dental Surgery (BDS) degree from Goenka Research Institute of Dental Science, Gandhinagar. She participated in Miss India 2019 where she was in the top 3 finalist of Miss India Gujarat.

== Career ==
Bodiwala made her acting debut in the Gujarati film, Chhello Divas, written and directed by Krishnadev Yagnik. The film released on 20 November 2015 in 231 screens worldwide with positive reviews from critics and commercial success.

In 2017, she acted in O! Taareee, Tamburo and Daud Pakad. She later appeared in films like Chhutti Jashe Chhakka, Tari Maate Once More (2018) and Bau Na Vichaar (2019). She appeared in Krishnadev Yagnik's Naadi Dosh (2022) along with Yash Soni. In 2023, she starred in Vash, which was a blockbuster film, and Bodiwala's performance was applauded by the audience.

In 2024, she made her Hindi cinema debut alongside Ajay Devgn, Jyothika, and R. Madhavan in Vikas Bahl's Shaitaan, the remake of Vash, where she reprised her role as Aarya in the film, but under the new name Jahnvi Rishi.

== Media ==
Bodiwala was ranked in The Times Most Desirable Women at No. 50 in 2019.

== Filmography ==
All films are in Gujarati unless stated otherwise.

Year	Title	Role	Notes	Ref.
2015	Chhello Divas	Pooja		
2017	O Taareee	Deepa		
2017	Tamburo	Dimple		
2017	Daud Pakad	Priyanka	Guest appearance	
2018	Chhutti Jashe Chhakka	Ankita		
2018	Tari Maate Once More	Aaisha		
2019	Bau Na Vichar	Shivani		
2022	Naadi Dosh	Riddhi		
2022	Tu Rajee Re	Disha		
2023	Vash	Aarya		
2024	Shaitaan	Janhvi Rishi	Hindi film	
2024	Trisha on the Rocks!	Trisha		
2025	Vash Level 2	Aarya		
2025	Chaniya Toli		Special appearance	
2026	Mardaani 3	Fatima Anwar	Hindi film	

== Awards and nominations ==
Year	Award	Category	Film	Result	Ref.
2025	25th International Indian Film Academy Awards	Best Supporting Actress	Shaitaan	Won	
2025	National Film Awards	Best Actress in a Supporting Role	Vash	Won	
2025	70th Filmfare Awards	Best Supporting Actress	Shaitaan	Nominated	
