= Romeo & Radhika =

2016 film by Siddharth Trivedi

- Film poster
- Directed by: Siddharth Trivedi
- Screenplay by: Vipul Sharma
- Story by: Siddharth Trivedi
- Produced by: Suresh M. Shah
- Starring: Vidhi Parikh; Tushar Sadhu; Hemang Dave; Shyam Nair
- Cinematography: Arvindsinh Puvar
- Edited by: Meraj Ali
- Music by: Vinay Kapadia
- Production companies: Nakoda Productions; Siddharth Trivedi Films
- Release date: 15 July 2016
- Running time: 160 minutes
- Country: India
- Language: Gujarati
- Budget: ₹2.5 crore (equivalent to ₹3.6 crore or US$370,000 in 2023)

Romeo & Radhika (Gujarati: રોમિયો એન્ડ રાધીકા) is a 2016 Gujarati romantic comedy film, directed by Siddharth Trivedi and produced by Suresh M. Shah. The film stars Vidhi Parikh, Tushar Sadhu, Hemang Dave, Shyam Nair. The title of the film is a wordplay on Romeo and Juliet.

== Cast ==
- Vidhi Parikh as Radhika
- Tushar Sadhu as Rahul
- Hemang Dave as Bhuppi
- Shyam Nair as Sunny
- Shahbaz Khan as JD
- Mushtaq Khan as Mehtaji
- Raj Premi as Velji
- Javed Haider as Chandu
- Sharad Sharma as Prof. Nandan
- Sharad Vyas as Mohandas
- Rup Divetiya as Gauri
- Prabhakar Shukla as Imtiyaz Ali
- Pratish Vora as Amar
- Kanwal Taff as Ayesha
- Riddhi Raval as Prof. Lovleen
- Ritika Jilka as Juhi
- Rashmi Banker as Prof. Komal
- Bhuman Bhatt as Dr. Rathod

== Production ==
The film was announced in September 2015. The film began shooting in September 2015 in Palanpur.

== Music ==
The soundtrack of the album is composed by Vinay Kapadia with lyrics written by Dashrath Mewal. The soundtrack album consists of five tracks.

=== Soundtrack ===
Romeo & Radhika

Soundtrack album by Vinay Kapadia
- Released: 16 April 2016
- Genre: Feature film soundtrack
- Length: 25:27
- Language: Gujarati
- Labels: Nakoda Productions; Siddharth Trivedi Films
- Producer: Suresh M. Shah

Vinay Kapadia composed the music. The songs are sung by Vinay Kapadia, Rahul Jain, Pallavi Kelkar and Tarika Bhatia, and the lyrics of were written by Dashrath Mewal.

Tracklist
| No. | Title | Lyrics | Artist(s) | Length |
|---|---|---|---|---|
| 1. | "Masti Ma Malang" | Dashrath Mewal | Vinay Kapadia & Tarika Bhatia | 4:32 |
| 2. | "Tara Prem Ma Maru Man" | Dashrath Mewal | Rahul Jain | 4.56 |
| 3. | "Jane Anjane Anokha Sapna" | Dashrath Mewal | Rahul Jain | 4.56 |
| 4. | "E Rab Kari Le Tu Muj Par Karam" | Dashrath Mewal | Vinay Kapadia & Pallvi Kelkar | 5:40 |
| 5. | "Thai Gaya Pech" | Dashrath Mewal | Vinay Kapadia & Pallvi Kelkar | 5:21 |
| Total length: | | | | 25:27 |

== Release ==
The trailer for the film was released on 16 June 2016. The film was released on 15 July 2016.
