= Tari Maate Once More =

- Directed by: Saurin Chaoudhary
- Written by: Rhythm Bhojak
- Produced by: Namrata Agrawal
- Starring: Bharat Chawda; Janki Bodiwala; Ojas Rawal; Shraddha Dangar; Hemang Dave; Jolly Rathod; Meera Acharya; Ragi Jani
- Cinematography: Sandeep raj
- Music by: Hiren Bhojak
- Production company: Kushal Entertainment ( A division of Kushal Limited)
- Release date: 21 September 2018
- Running time: 158 minutes
- Country: India
- Language: Gujarati

Tari Maate Once More is a 2018 Gujarati musical comedy-drama starring veteran Gujarati actor Bharat Chawda in the lead role, Janki Bodiwala in a supporting role, Ojas Rawal, Hemangiomas Dave, Jolly Rathod, Meera Acharya and Ragi Jani. The film is directed by Saurin Chaoudhary, and produced by Namrata Agrawal from Kushal Entertainment. Hiren Bhojak created the music and Rhythm Bhojak created the concept and writing. The nationwide release was by Rupam Entertainment.

== Plot ==
It is a triangle love story with much humorous situational comedy and much masti masala content. There is a suspense, romance, comedy, drama, melodrama, aggression, problems at one situation. There are six friends Mihir, Tara, Aaisha, Jaddu, Maggie and Harry. Mihir and Aaisha love each other but Tara loves Mihir. Unfortunately somehow Mihir proposed to Tara instead of Aaisha. There was a huge misunderstanding. After two years Mihir and Tara are going to get engaged with each other because Mihir doesn't want to hurt Tara's emotions and feelings. Due to funny incident Mihir and Tara's engagement got cancelled and all friends met again. They planned for Goa trip again, where Mihir and Aaisha attracted with each other and fall in love.

== Cast ==
- Bharat Chawda as Mihir
- Janki Bodiwala as Aaisha
- Ojas Rawal as Magi
- Shraddha Dangar as Jaadu
- Hemang Dave as Harry
- Jolly Rathod as Tara
- Meera Acharya as Shailja
- Ragi Jani as Don bhai

== Production ==
=== Development ===
The film is produced Namrata Agrawal from Kushal Entertainment (a division of Kushal Limited). The story and concept are by Rhytham Bhojak. Hiren Bhojak is music director of the film. Tari Maate Once More ropes in big Bollywood singers such as Shaan_(singer), Freedom Sharma, Vinod Shinde, and Hiren Bhojak. The film's negative rights have been sold to shemaroo Entertainment and available to watch on Shemaroo Me

=== Filming ===
Shooting of the film started in post June 2017. The shooting is said to set in some parts of Ahmedabad and Goa in India.

=== Music ===
The soundtrack of the album is composed by Hiren Bhojak with lyrics written by Hiren Bhojak and Kamini Shah. The soundtrack album consists of four tracks. The film's three songs were released by Zee_Music_Company.

== Soundtrack ==
Tari Maate Once more

Soundtrack album by Hiren Bhojak
- Released: 2018
- Genre: Feature film soundtrack
- Language: Gujarati

Hiren Bhojak has composed the music of this film. Lyrics of the tracks were written by Hiren Bhojak and Kamini Shah. Music label for the film is Zee_Music_Company

Tracklist
No.	Title	Lyrics	Artist(s)	Length
1.	"Tari Maate Hu Hu Shu Karu"	Hiren Bhojak	Hiren Bhojak & Vinod Shinde	3:37
2.	"Changi Hu Main"	Kamini Shah	Freedom Sharma & Hiren Bhojak	4.20
3.	"Bin Tere"	Hiren Bhojak	Shaan_(singer)	4.46
4.	"Mango Tango"	Hiren Bhojak	Shaan_(singer)	4.40
Total length:				16:43
