= Chhutti Jashe Chhakka =

2018 Gujarati Language Film

- Poster
- Directed by: Durgesh Tanna
- Written by: Durgesh Tanna
- Screenplay by: Durgesh Tanna
- Produced by: Nishant Thacker
- Starring: Janki Bodiwala; Bharat Chawda; Saurbh Rajyaguru; Hemang Dave; Maulik Nayak
- Cinematography: Ravindranath Guru
- Edited by: Pranav Patel
- Music by: Kedar-Bhargav
- Production company: Shemaroo Entertainment Ltd
- Release date: 22 June 2018
- Running time: 2 hours 28 minutes
- Country: India
- Language: Gujarati

Chhutti Jashe Chhakka is a 2018 Gujarati language drama film written and directed by Durgesh Tanna and produced by Nishant Thaker. The music and score was composed by Kedar-Bhargav and the lyrics was written by Niren Bhatt and Bhargav Purohit. It stars Janki Bodiwala, Bharat Chawda, Saurabh Rajyaguru, Hemang Dave and Maulik Nayak. Avani Soni was casting director of the film.

== Plot ==
Sachin Thakkar (Saurabh Rajyaguru) is a cricket-crazy, well-settled family man but he is discontent with his middle-class family life. After losing some money in the share market he wants to earn some quick bucks to get rid of his problems. He gets influenced by a childhood friend, Raj Nag aka Nagraj, who wants him to put his knowledge of cricket to the world of cricket betting - a seemingly easy and quick route to making a fortune. Following is a roller coaster ride into a world they had never imagined.

== Cast ==
- Janki Bodiwala
- Saurabh Rajyaguru
- Bharat Chawda
- Arvind Vegda
- Hemang Dave
- Maulik Nayak
- Shaunak Vyas

== Soundtrack ==
The soundtrack of Chhutti Jashe Chhakka consists of 4 songs composed by the duo Kedar-Bhargav with the lyrics being written by Niren Bhatt and Bhargav Purohit.

Song name	Lyrics	Singers	Duration
Pagrav	Niren Bhatt	Harshit Chauhan, Mirande Shah	04:33
Color Color Which Color	Bhargav Purohit	Divya Kumar, Bhoomi Trivedi	04:00
Chhutti Jashe Chhakka	Bhargav Purohit	Arvind Vegda	03:07
Khadi Lagaadi	Bhargav Purohit	Bhargav Purohit	00:31

== Release ==
The film was released on 22 June 2018.
