= Arvind Vegda =

Indian folk singer (born 1974)

- Born: Ahmedabad, Gujarat, India
- Occupations: Musician; singer
- Known for: Gujarati folk music
- Spouse: Aarti Vegda

Arvind Vegda is a Gujarati folk singer from Gujarat, India. He was a contestant on the reality television show Bigg Boss 9 in 2015.

== Early life ==
Arvind Vegda is born on 5 October 1974 in Ahmedabad. He completed his school education from the Vidhyanagar High School. He joined a diploma in drama but dropped to pursue commerce. He graduated from Navgujarat College. Vegda started his career as a marketing agent for an air conditioning firm. After working for twelve years in marketing, he was appointed the president of the Ahmedabad Chapter of Indian Society of Heating and Refrigerating Air-Conditioning Engineers.

== Career ==
Arvind Vegda has no formal training in music. He started learning the harmonium under Narendra Rao and later formed an orchestra in 2002. They started performing at Navratri venues. In 2006, following the sudden death of Maniraj Barot, he was invited to perform at Navratri Garba in Ahmedabad where he first time performed his track, "Bhai Bhai".

His popularity emerged with his most popular track, "Bhai Bhai", which has more than 1 million hits on YouTube. His music albums including Bhala Mori Rama (2011) have sold over half a million copies. He was also roped in by the Bharatiya Janata Party for its 2012 Gujarat election campaign.

In 2015, he participated as a contestant on the reality show Bigg Boss 9. He sang a promotional Gujarati version of the song "Jabro Fan" from the 2016 Hindi film Fan.

== Television ==
Year	Name	Role	Channel	Notes	Ref
2015	Bigg Boss 9	Contestant	Colors TV	Entered Day 1, Evicted Day 20	

== Filmography ==
Year	Film	Role	Notes	Ref
2022	BaagadBillaa	Chandu	Gujarati film	
2024	Bubbly Bindaas		Gujarati film	
2025	Chhutachheda		Gujarati film	
2026	K Kh G Gh		Gujarati film	
2026	Mitrata		As a Singer	
