= Khiladi (franchise) =

Bollywood media franchise

- Created by: Abbas–Mustan; Akshay Kumar
- Original work: Khiladi (1992)

Films and television
- Film(s): Khiladi (1992); Main Khiladi Tu Anari (1994); Sabse Bada Khiladi (1995); Khiladiyon Ka Khiladi (1996); Mr. and Mrs. Khiladi (1997); International Khiladi (1999); Khiladi 420 (2000); Khiladi 786 (2012)
- Television series: Fear Factor: Khatron Ke Khiladi

Khiladi film series
- Directed by: Abbas–Mustan; Sameer Malkan; Umesh Mehra (3 films); David Dhawan; Neeraj Vora; Ashish R Mohan
- Produced by: Ganesh Jain; Keshu Ramsay
- Starring: Akshay Kumar
- Production companies: Venus Movies; DMS Movies; Hari Om Entertainment
- Distributed by: United Seven Combines; Eros International
- Country: India
- Language: Hindi

Khiladi is an Indian media franchise created by Akshay Kumar and Abbas–Mustan, consisting of a Bollywood action film series and an Indian stunt television series starring Akshay Kumar. Other than starring Akshay Kumar and the word "Khiladi" ("Stager" or literally "Player" in Hindi) in the title, the films and television series have little in common, with the producers, directors and stories being different. The Khiladi film series was notable for its action scenes and stunt sequences performed by Akshay Kumar, including some of Indian cinema's most dangerous stunts, drawing comparisons to Hong Kong action cinema's Jackie Chan.

Khiladi (1992), directed by Abbas–Mustan, was the first in a series of films which had Akshay Kumar in the title role and gave him his first breakthrough role. It was followed by Main Khiladi Tu Anari (1994), Sabse Bada Khiladi (1995), Khiladiyon Ka Khiladi (1996), Mr. and Mrs. Khiladi (1997), International Khiladi (1999), Khiladi 420 (2000), and Khiladi 786 (2012) all featuring Kumar in the lead role. In 2008, Kumar launched a television show Fear Factor: Khatron Ke Khiladi, which revolves around performing stunts.

== Films ==
The series consists of eight films, starting from Khiladi in 1992. The latest installment in the series is Khiladi 786 released in 2012. The films are not linked to each other in any way other than Akshay Kumar playing the leading role in each of them. The series primarily belongs to the action and thriller genre but also had elements of romantic comedy like Mr and Mrs Khiladi (1997) and the latest installment Khiladi 786 (2012) which is an action comedy.

The first two films were produced by Champak Jain and Keshu Ramsay produced the next five films in the series. The latest installment was produced by Himesh Reshammiya. Umesh Mehra is the only director who worked on three films in the series and the other films had varied directors.

=== List ===
Film	Release date	Verdict	Director(s)
Khiladi	5 June 1992	HIT	Abbas–Mustan
Main Khiladi Tu Anari	23 September 1994	HIT	Sameer Malkan
Sabse Bada Khiladi	June 9, 1995	HIT	Umesh Mehra
Khiladiyon Ka Khiladi	14 June 1996	SUPER HIT	Umesh Mehra
Mr. and Mrs. Khiladi	9 October 1997	SEMI HIT	David Dhawan
International Khiladi	26 March 1999	BELOW AVERAGE	Umesh Mehra
Khiladi 420	29 December 2000	DISASTER	Neeraj Vora
Khiladi 786	7 December 2012	SEMI HIT	Ashish R Mohan

== Plot ==
=== Khiladi (1992) ===
Raj Malhotra (Akshay Kumar), Boney (Deepak Tijori), Sheetal Nath (Sabeeha) and Neelam Choudhary (Ayesha Jhulka) are four pranksters in their college. Raj is younger brother of Inspector Suresh Malhotra (Shakti Kapoor), Boney probably has no relatives, Sheetal is the daughter of minister Kailash Nath (Prem Chopra) while Neelam is rich heiress with her uncle (Anant Mahadevan) as her only living relative. Raj and Neelam are romantically involved.

Raj bets habitually and has not lost yet, but when he bets that he can extort money from Kailash, the remaining gang is sceptical. As per the bet, they make Kailash believe that Sheetal is kidnapped, while in reality they have housed themselves in a cottage outside Bombay belonging to Pillai (Johnny Lever). But when Sheetal is murdered mysteriously, the investigation is given to Suresh. Raj, Boney and Neelam try to clean their trail.

The group suspects that the avoidance of three fatal accidents may be more than just macabre coincidences, unaware that the problem is much bigger and sinister than they can ever imagine.

=== Main Khiladi Tu Anari (1994) ===
One of the most respected inspectors, Arjun Joglekar (Mukesh Khanna) is killed by drug dealer and gangster Goli (Shakti Kapoor). Mona (Shilpa Shetty), a cabaret singer and Goli's mistress, agrees to testify against Goli and is placed into witness protection by Inspector Karan (Akshay Kumar), Arjun's younger brother, who aims to fight any injustice and avenge his brother's murder. When Goli finds out about Mona's forthcoming testimonial which would expose his real identity, he tracks her down and kills her.

Deepak Kumar (Saif Ali Khan), who is the most romantic actor around, is frustrated with his roles and being type-caste as a romantic hero. He would like to do something different and bring some change and excitement to his dull and boring existence. To change his monotonous life, he gets drunk and drives around. He is arrested by the police, and brought to his rowdy producer. This is where he meets Karan and is very impressed with his assertiveness, courage, and honesty; Deepak would like to study his behavior so that he can use this as a background for his next movie.

Karan meets Basanti who looks identical to Mona. He promises to let Deepak hang around him if Deepak can get Basanti to act as Mona. Deepak trains Basanti and presents the new "Mona" to Karan. Karan places Basanti at the Moonlight Hotel as an amnesiac Mona, where she can report on Goli's criminal activities. That's how they uncover Goli eventually. While Karan and Mona fall in love with each other, Deepak falls in love with Karan's sister, Shivangi.

=== Sabse Bada Khiladi (1995) ===
Lallu (Akshay Kumar) is an orphan who was separated from his parents and his brother as a child and has been brought up by foster parents. He travels to Bombay to look for a job and starts working as a loyal servant for rich businessman Jamna Das (Avtar Gill). One day he discovers Jamna Das's daughter Sunita (Mamta Kulkarni) drunk in a nightclub and takes her home. Jamna Das realises how loyal Lallu is and how he never took advantage of Sunita in her drunken state decides they shall marry. Sunita immediately refuses as she is in love with Amit (Mohnish Behl). When Jamna Das suddenly dies of a heart attack, his will and testament reveals that Sunita must marry Lallu or she will not be entitled to any of his wealth and estate. Seeing no other option she marries Lallu but decides to have him killed with the help of Amit so that she can inherit all of her father's wealth. Sunita and Amit succeed in their plan to kill Lallu by poisoning him, putting him into a car, and crashing it to make it look like an accident. His death is considered suspicious, and the case is assigned to Inspector Vijay Kumar (also Akshay Kumar), who is a lookalike of the supposedly deceased Lallu.

=== Khiladiyon Ka Khiladi (1996) ===
A criminal don, Maya (Rekha), hosts illegal wrestling matches in Canada (Toronto) and has the full support of the local Police Commissioner. Ajay Malhotra has relocated to Canada and has started his own orchestra with the help of some of his friends.

His brother, Akshay (Akshay Kumar), decides to visit him on hearing that he wants to marry his beloved in Canada; on the airplane he meets Priya (Raveena Tandon), and both fall in love. Once in the Russia, Akshay finds out that the police have a warrant for the arrest of Ajay and want to question him. Akshay's attempts to locate Ajay lands him with Maya, who happens to be Priya's sister. Apparently Maya is holding Ajay and will only release him after he hands over incriminating documents. Akshay soon wins Maya's confidence by rescuing her from attempts on her life made by King Don (Gulshan Grover), and Maya begins to like him and trust him. Akshay then proposes to her, to which Maya agrees, much to the disappointment of Priya.

Soon Akshay kills Maya's men when they get to know of his true identity. He also organises a fake kidnap drama with Ajay's friends, who kidnap him and demand that Maya come to meet them with Ajay. By now Maya realizes that Akshay is Ajay's brother and Priya actually loves Akshay. At the end, Maya commits suicide, and before dying she hands over her sister Priya to Akshay.

=== Mr. and Mrs. Khiladi (1997) ===
When his astrologer uncle (Satish Kaushik) predicts a favorable future for Raja (Akshay Kumar), he decides to do nothing until the prediction comes true. When he meets Shalu (Juhi Chawla) the daughter of a millionaire (Kader Khan) he decides his predicted future has arrived. However his lazy lifestyle does not meet with his future father-in-law's standards, and he insists that Raja does some hard work for a change

=== International Khiladi (1999) ===
News Reporter Payal (Twinkle Khanna) and her camera-man have been assigned the task of interviewing the world's highest ranking criminal don, Rahul aka Devraj (Akshay Kumar), which they accept. In the process, Payal and Devraj fall in love with each other, much to the opposition of Bismillah (Mukesh Khanna), Devraj's guardian on one hand; and Police Inspector Amit (Rajat Bedi), and Payal's brother Ravi (Vivek Shaq) on the other. The result is that Ravi is killed; Devraj takes the blame, and is arrested. Payal testifies against him, and Devraj is sentenced to be hanged. When Bismillah finds about this plot tracks them down but Amit so as to save him and Payal kills him. But Devraj escapes from custody, and begins to plot vengeance against his enemies, including Payal, as well as the real killer of Ravi. As the story unfolds, it is revealed that Amit was the one who killed Ravi and joined Thakral to frame Devraj for it. But Amit later betrays Thakral and kills him. He then takes Payal on a flight where Devraj tracks him down and kills him. The story ends with Payal and Devraj's marriage.

=== Khiladi 420 (2000) ===
Shyam Prasad Bhardwaj (Alok Nath) is a multi-millionaire industrialist, and his business is spread worldwide. He has a daughter, Ritu (Mahima Chaudhry), who is of marriageable age. He hires Dev Kumar (Akshay Kumar) to work for him, and is impressed with the way Dev handles himself. Shyam would like Ritu and Dev to get married. But days after the engagement, Shyam finds that Dev is a con man after his money, since he has taken debt from a criminal (Gulshan Grover).

Dev kills Shyam to bury the secret but Ritu's younger sister Riya sees this. The girl goes into a deep shock and since Dev is constantly watching her the secret cannot come out. Dev plans to kill her as well but Ritu gets an inkling of the truth somehow. Dev tries to kill Ritu on the night of their honeymoon, but Ritu manages to kill him. An afraid Ritu decides to hide Dev's body.

After hiding Dev's body, Ritu comes home. She gets the shock of her life to see Dev alive – and without a scratch on his body. Dev behaves as if nothing happened. Everyone in the home believes him to be Dev. Finally, when she is alone with him, Ritu confronts this new Dev. He tells that he is indeed Dev's twin brother Anand.

Anand explains that Dev had crooked ways, something which Dev disliked. The brothers separated. Dev called Anand just a week ago to tell that he has mended his ways and will soon marry. Dev came there meet Ritu. Dev had given all the information about Ritu and her family to Anand. That night, Anand came to meet Dev just after Ritu had killed him. Anand saw all the mess and realized that something had gone wrong.

But when he saw his ID, he realized that Anand was posing as Anand here. Now Dev was probably dead, for which he is grateful to Ritu as Anand might have had a plan to kill him along with her. Ritu and Anand kept this a secret. However, Inspector Rahul, an old friend of Ritu, became suspicious. Besides, Dev's girlfriend, whom Anand does not recognize, thinks that Dev has dumped her. Dev's another enemy is a criminal (Mukesh Rishi) who is also a rival of his money lender.

Ritu slowly starts falling for Anand, but Anand doesn't reciprocate the feelings. Anand has to live a double life – in front of the bad guys, he is Anand while in front of Ritu's family he is Dev. Rahul becomes suspicious that Ritu and Dev conspired to kill Shyam. To save Ritu, Dev takes the blame on his shoulders.

Meanwhile, when both the criminals try to get even with Dev, Rahul realizes that he has not seen a clear picture. Anand tells him the true story, which he reluctantly believes. As he cannot see an innocent man die, Rahul proposes that Dev can live only if Anand's dead body is found.

Anand escapes from custody as per Rahul's plans and retrieves his brother's body from the place where Ritu hid it. He wants the people to believe that the bad twin died in an accident after the escape while he is the good person. Dev's rivals unite and try to kill Anand. Dev's girlfriend dies in the melee after learning the truth. Anand succeeds in killing the villain. When Dev's body is found, the court closes the case. Anand is exonerated and reunited with Ritu.

=== Khiladi 786 (2012) ===
Born to an owner of a marriage bureau Champak Lal (Manoj Joshi), Mansukh (Himesh Reshammiya) has been a complete failure ever since he has grown up and tried to help his father in their family business. All the alliances he had tried to get done have resulted in separation even before the marriage took place. One fine day Champak Lal gets fed-up of Mansukh and throws him out of the house. Helpless, he goes to his friend Jeevan (Sanjay Mishra), who owns a coffin shop. Mansukh tells the whole story to Jeevan while drinking alcohol. Irritated with the drinking, Jeevan snatches and throws the bottle, which ends up breaking the glass of a windshield of a car.

The person driving the car was Indu Tendulkar (Asin Thottumkal), a brat, hot-headed girl who usually takes her wannabe husbands on a 'long drive', where she drives very rashly and crazily to drive away those guys. This was a similar case – Indu was taking Raj on a 'long drive' when the bottle broke her windshield which caused the car to crash into the tree. Raj, who is terrified, runs away. Indu points the gun at Mansukh and Jeevan, when some goons arrive. The goons tell Indu to get back home, before they ask Mansukh and Jeevan who they were and what they did for a living. The goons smile when they get to know that Mansukh is a marriage bureau.

The goons take them to the house of Tatya Tukaram Tendulkar, abbreviated as 'TTT' or 'TT' (Mithun Chakraborty), an infamous don against who the police could never find proof. TT gives Mansukh the ultimatum of getting Indu married within ten days, or they would lose their lives. On going back to Jeevan's shop, Jeevan starts panicking, while Mansukh calmly counts the advance payment that they just got. On Jeevan asking if there was any man who would be ready to marry Indu, Mansukh says that there is, and his name was 'Bahattar Singh'.

Bahattar, which literally means '72', was police officer in a small village of Punjab called 'Taasi'. He was strong, swift and agile enough to beat up an entire gang of smugglers alone. He always helped people, which earned him the title 'Khiladi'; On his hand the number '786' was inscribed, which means that he is blessed by Allah or God, thus earning him the name 'Khiladi 786'. But there was one problem in his life – no girl was ever ready to marry him, even though his father Sattar '70' Singh (Raj Babbar), and his uncle Ikhattar '71' Singh (Mukesh Rishi) never lost hope. They had a Canadian and a Chinese wife respectively, while their mother (Bahattar's paternal grandmother) was African. Both of them were also police officers. Ikhattar's son was Chauhattar '74' Singh, because Tihattar '73' Singh, Bahattar's younger brother, got lost in a fair as a young child.

So when Mansukh knocks on the door with an alliance for Bahattar, everyone jumps in joy. But when Sattar asks Mansukh the family background of Indu, he says that her brother TT was in the police just like them, in hesitation. But the truth was that Bahattar's family was not in the police either – they just used to behave as if they were by wearing uniforms given by Jugnu Singh (Shubham Singh), a family friend. So when they heard that TT was in the police, they were in panic as well. But they stay quiet, for the sake of Bahattar's wedding.

Bahattar and his family set out for Mumbai, the place where TT lived. Meanwhile, Mansukh is preparing TT to act as a police officer, and TT is ready to do that, because he wanted a crime-free family for Indu, and he didn't know that eve Bahattar's family were actually conmen. Indu was not happy on the arrival of Bahattar, but Bahattar mistakes it as if she overjoyed to see him. Indu, wanting to take him on a 'long drive', asks him to go out for the same. But Bahattar is calm even though she drives crazily. Instead, Indu gets terrified when Bahattar starts driving, as he drives worse than her.

To make her happy, Bahattar takes her to a disco. But there she reveals to him that she has a boyfriend, Azad Reddy (Rahul Singh), who was in jail. A heartbroken Bahattar promises Indu to get Azad out of jail to make her happy. On doing so, Bahattar tells Indu that he is not a police officer, and Indu tells the same about TT. While Bahattar and Indu are talking. Azad shows attitude towards Indu, for which Indu realizes his character and chooses Bahattar over Azad.

On the wedding day, according to the Hindu tradition, the couple is supposed to take seven rounds around a fire to complete the wedding. But after only six rounds, Azad kidnaps Indu from the ceremony to take revenge. Bahattar and TT fight their way through Azad's goons and rescue Indu. Just as they are about to take the seventh round, a police officer arrives, who turns out to be none other than Tihattar Singh (Akshay Kumar). The family reunites and Indu and Bahattar get married. Champak Lal also arrives there to bless his son, who just completed his first wedding. The film ends with Bahattar and Indu celebrating their wedding with the song 'Hookah Bar'.

== Principal cast ==
This table lists the main characters who appear in the Khiladi Franchise.

List indicator
- A dark grey cell indicates the character was not in the film.

Actor/Actress	Film							
Actor/Actress	Khiladi (1992)	Main Khiladi Tu Anari (1994)	Sabse Bada Khiladi (1995)	Khiladiyon Ka Khiladi (1996)	Mr. and Mrs. Khiladi (1997)	International Khiladi (1999)	Khiladi 420 (2000)	Khiladi 786 (2012)
Akshay Kumar	Raj Malhotra	Karan Joglekar	Inspector Vijay Kumar / Lallu	Akshay Malhotra	Rajant "Raja" Kapoor / Mr. Khiladi	Rahul / Devraj	Dev Kumar Malhotra / Anand Kumar Malhotra	Bahattar Singh / Tehattar Singh
Johnny Lever	Anna Pillai	Dhansukh			bandaged patient	Focus		Bhalerao Kambli
Shakti Kapoor	Suresh Malhotra	Goli						
Ayesha Jhulka	Neelam Choudhary							
Deepak Tijori	Boney							
Sabeeha	Sheetal Nath							
Prem Chopra	Kailash Nath							
Anant Mahadevan	Neelam's uncle	Himself						
Saif Ali Khan		Deepak Kumar						
Shilpa Shetty		Mona / Basanti						
Rageshwari		Shivangi						
Mukesh Khanna		Arjun Joglekar				Bismillah		
Kader Khan		Ram Lal / Commissioner			Badri Prasad			
Gulshan Grover			Inspector K.Kada	King Don		Thakral	Bhai	
Mamta Kulkarni			Sunita Das					
Mohnish Behl			Amit Singh Choudhury					
Avtar Gill			Jamna Das			Defence Lawyer		
Sadashiv Amrapurkar			Amar Singh Choudhary					
Raveena Tandon		herself (cameo)		Priya				
Rekha				Madam Maya				
Inder Kumar				Ajay Malhotra				
Brian Lee				The Undertaker				
Juhi Chawla					Shalu Prasad			
Paresh Rawal					Pratap Prasad			
Himani Shivpuri					Raja's mother			
Satish Kaushik					Chanda Mama			
Twinkle Khanna						Payal		
Rajat Bedi						Amit		
Vivek Shauq						Ravi		
Mahima Chaudhry							Ritu Bhardwaj	
Antara Mali							Monica D'Souza	
Mukesh Rishi							Bhai	Ikhatar Singh
Asin								Indu Tendulkar
Mithun Chakraborty								Tatya Tukaram Tendulkar
Himesh Reshammiya								Mansukh Desai
Raj Babbar								Sattar Singh

== Crew ==
Occupation	Film							
Occupation	Khiladi (1992)	Main Khiladi Tu Anari (1994)	Sabse Bada Khiladi (1995)	Khiladiyon Ka Khiladi (1996)	Mr. and Mrs. Khiladi (1997)	International Khiladi (1999)	Khiladi 420 (2000)	Khiladi 786 (2012)
Director	Abbas–Mustan	Sameer Malkan	Umesh Mehra	Umesh Mehra	David Dhawan	Umesh Mehra	Neeraj Vora	Ashish R Mohan
Producer(s)	Girish Jain; Champak Jain	Champak Jain	Keshu Ramsay	Keshu Ramsay	Keshu Ramsay	Keshu Ramsay	Keshu Ramsay	Twinkle Khanna; Himesh Reshammiya; Sunil Lulla
Screenplay	Naeem-Ejaz; Aadesh K. Arjun	Sachin Bhowmick	Umesh Mehra; Ved Prakash Sharma	Umesh Mehra; Anand S. Vardhan	Rumi Jaffery	Ved Prakash Sharma	Uttam Gada	Kushal Ved Bakshi
Story	S. Khan	Sachin Bhowmick	Ved Prakash Sharma	Umesh Mehra	P. Kalaimani	Ved Prakash Sharma	Uttam Gada	Himesh Reshammiya
Cinematography	Thomas Xavier	Akram Khan	S. Pappu	Peter Pereira	K.S. Prakash Rao	S. Pappu	Monu Gupta	Attar Singh Saini
Editor	Hussain A. Burmawala	Suresh Chaturvedi	Kamal Saigal	Kamal Saigal	A. Muthu	Kamal Saigal	Mohammed Ashfaque	Bunty Nagi
Composer(s)	Jatin–Lalit	Anu Malik	Rajesh Roshan	Anu Malik	Anu Malik	Aadesh Shrivastava	Sanjeev-Darshan	Himesh Reshammiya
Background Score	Ramesh Iyer; Pradeep Lad	Anu Malik	Raju Singh	Raju Singh	Anu Malik	Aadesh Shrivastava	Sanjoy Chowdhury	Himesh Reshammiya

== Soundtrack ==
=== Khiladi ===
#	Title	Singer(s)	Length
1	"Wada Raha Sanam"	Abhijeet, Alka Yagnik	06:02
2	"Khud Ko Kya Samajhti Hai"	Abhijeet, Udit Narayan, Kavita Krishnamurthy, Sapna Mukherjee	06:35
3	"Hoke Mann Aaj Magan"	Asha Bhosle, Abhijeet, Udit Narayan	05:07
4	"Kya Khabar Thi Jaana"	Asha Bhosle, Abhijeet	05:00
5	"Dekha Teri Mast"	Asha Bhosle, Kumar Sanu	05:48
6	"Tu Shama Main Parwana Tera"	Abhijeet, Alisha Chinai	07:20

=== Main Khiladi Tu Anari ===
#	Song	Singer(s)	Notes
1	"Chura Ke Dil Mera"	Kumar Sanu & Alka Yagnik	Picturised on Akshay Kumar and Shilpa Shetty
2	"Zara Zara"	Kumar Sanu & Alka Yagnik	Picturised on Saif Ali Khan & Rageshwari
3	"Zuban Khamosh"	Kumar Sanu & Alka Yagnik	Picturised on Akshay Kumar and Shilpa Shetty
4	"Lakhon Haseen"	Asha Bhosle & Kumar Sanu	Not included in the film.
5	"Hoton Pe Tera Naam"	Pankaj Udhas	
6	"Dil Ka Darwaza"	Alka Yagnik	Picturised on Shilpa Shetty
7	"My Adorable Darling"	Anu Malik & Alisha Chinai	Picturised on Saif Ali Khan & Raveena Tandon
8	"Main Khiladi Tu Anari"	Abhijeet, Udit Narayan & Anu Malik	Picturised on Akshay Kumar & Saif Ali Khan

=== Sabse Bada Khiladi ===
Title	Singer(s)
Bholi Bhali Ladki	Kumar Sanu, Alka Yagnik
Har Dil Main Hai Rab Bastaa	Kumar Sanu
Mukaala Mukaabla	Kumar Sanu, Alka Yagnik
Zehar Hain Ke Pyar Hain Tera Chumma	Kumar Sanu
Bharo Maang Meri Bharo	Abhijeet, Jyoti

=== Khiladiyon Ka Khiladi ===
The film soundtrack contains 7 songs composed by Anu Malik.

Song	Singer(s)
Tu Kaun Hai Tera Naam Kya	Kumar Sanu, Sadhana Sargam
Aaj Meri Zindagi	Babul Supriyo, Alka Yagnik
In The Night No Control	Sumitra
Itna Mujhe Pata Hai	Abhijeet, Kavita Krishnamurthy
Maa Sherawaliye	Sonu Nigam
Mera Baba Shahi Fakir	Bali Brahmabhatt
Tu Waaqif Nahi Meri Deewangi Se	Kumar Sanu, Sadhana Sargam

=== Mr. and Mrs. Khiladi ===
#	Song	Singer(s)	Length
1	"Akela Hai Mr. Khiladi"	Udit Narayan, Anuradha Paudwal	06:24
2	"Mujhe Hero Ban Jaane De"	Udit Narayan, Poornima	
3	"Jumme Ke Jumme"	Abhijeet, Poornima	07:11
4	"Jab Naukri Milegi"	Kumar Sanu	
5	"Samosa Mein Aaloo"	Abhijeet, Sapna Mukherjee, Poornima	05:26
6	"Hum Total Fida Tumpeh"	Anu Malik, Anuradha Paudwal	06:56
7	"Tu Kya Bangala Banaayega"	Udit Narayan, Alka Yagnik	

=== International Khiladi ===
#	Song	Singer(s)	Length
1	"Lutiya Gaya"	Sonu Nigam, Jaspinder Narula	04:24
2	"Saiyan Saiyan"	Abhijeet, Alka Yagnik	03:30
3	"International Khiladi"	Sonu Nigam	04:11
4	"Halka Halka Dard Hai"	Kumar Sanu, Alka Yagnik	05:07
5	"Kudi Kanwari"	Alka Yagnik, Roop Kumar Rathod, Johnny Lever, Bela Sulakhe	06:31
6	"Yaar Maine Ek Sapna Dekha"	Udit Narayan, Alka Yagnik	05:20
7	"Chookar Mere Man Ko"	Kumar Sanu, Alka Yagnik	06:06

=== Khiladi 420 ===
Title	Singer(s)
Batiyan Bujado	Sonu Nigam, Kavita Krishnamurthy
Dheere Dheere Sanam	Udit Narayan, Mahalakshmi Iyer
Dil Le Le Dil De De	Abhijeet, Alka Yagnik
Jagte Hain Hum	Sonu Nigam, Kavita Krishnamurthy
Kaisa Yeh Pyar Hai	Kumar Sanu, Kavita Krishnamurthy
Meri Biwi Ka Jawab Nahin	Sonu Nigam

=== Khiladi 786 ===
No.	Title	Lyrics	Singer(s)	Length
1.	"Lonely"	Shabbir Ahmed	Himesh Reshammiya, Yo Yo Honey Singh, Hamsika Iyer	04:09
2.	"Balma"	Sameer	Mynampati Sreeram Chandra & Shreya Ghoshal	03:49
3.	"Long Drive"	Sameer	Mika Singh	04:29
4.	"Sari Sari Raat"	Shabbir Ahmed	Himesh Reshammiya	05:31
5.	"Hookah Bar"	Himesh Reshammiya	Himesh Reshammiya, Vineet Singh & Aman Trikha	04:15
6.	"Khiladi (Title Track)"	Shabbir Ahmed	Vineet Singh, Aman Trikha, Yashraj Kapil, Alam Gir Khan & Rajdeep Chatterjee	04:15
7.	"Tu Hoor Pari"	Shabbir Ahmed	Javed Ali, Shreya Ghoshal, Chandrakala Singh & Harshdeep Kaur	05:25
8.	"Lonely (Remix)"	Shabbir Ahmed	Himesh Reshammiya, Honey Singh, Hamsika Iyer	04:02
9.	"Hookah Bar (Remix)"	Himesh Reshammiya	Himesh Reshammiya, Vineet Singh & Aman Trikha	03:23
10.	"Long Drive (Bhangra Mix)"	Sameer	Mika Singh	03:14
11.	"Balma (Remix)"	Sameer	Mynampati Sreeram Chandra & Shreya Ghoshal	04:31
12.	"Khiladi (Remix)"	Shabbir Ahmed	Vineet Singh, Aman Trikha, Yashraj Kapil, Alam Gir Khan & Rajdeep Chatterjee	04:05

== Stunts ==
Akshay Kumar has performed numerous risky stunts in these films. Kumar, who has a background in martial arts, is famed for performing his own stunts in his films, and is also an avid extreme sports enthusiast. His stunts in the film series have drawn comparisons to Jackie Chan.

=== Sabse Bada Khiladi ===
In Sabse Bada Khiladi, Akshay converted an airbase into his action playground during the climax of Sabse Bada Khiladi. Towards the end of the film, which involves car chases and fight scenes, Kumar performs various other stunts. During the finale, he is seen being chased by a car, dodging bullets, jumping off buildings, and climbing wall.

=== Khiladiyon Ka Khiladi ===
Khiladiyon Ka Khiladi boasts of countless jaw dropping stunts – Akshay vs Undertaker fights (Kumar even broke his back while lifting 'The Phenom' during the pre-climax setting at the temple); Street Fight sequence which had Akshay playing with his favorite 'Flying Kicks' Roof blowing climax where Akshay jumps from a bridge and gets crushed under an over craft . But the best is this martial art sequence where Akshay does a full split and kills Dang.

=== Khiladi 420 ===
In Khiladi 420, Akshay Kumar performed some of his most dangerous stunts during a scene in the film. During one scene, in Kumar's own words: "I had to catch this running plane and climb it. People are scared of sitting inside a plane, and like a stupid man I am standing on top of a plane. And then I'm supposed to jump from that plane, after it is a thousand feet up in the air, onto a hot air balloon. I did it in one shot." The stunt has been compared to Jackie Chan, who performed a similar hot air balloon stunt in Armour of God (1986).

Towards the end of the film, which involves car chases and fight scenes, Kumar performs various other stunts. During the finale, he is seen being chased by a car, dodging bullets, jumping off buildings, and climbing walls.

=== Khiladi 786 ===
Akshay performed a dangerous stunt where he jumped from a balcony of a bungalow of about 45 feet without any cables, wires or body-doubles. The only thing to soften his jump were some mattresses and card-boxes. The action sequences of the film have been provided by Jal Singh Nijjar. He showed his daredevil nature by ditching the safety measures and expertly diving onto the surrounding boxes and mattresses placed below. Risky yet spontaneous Akshay said his experience was 'Thrilling with lots of fun'.

== Commercial performance ==
=== Box office ===
Film	Year	Worldwide gross revenue	Adjusted gross revenue (est.)	Domestic footfalls (est. ticket sales)	Notes
Khiladi	1992	₹3.75 crore ($1.45 million)	₹64.43 crore (US$6.7 million)	4.4 million+	(Note: 1993 inflation rate of 17.18 times: Darr's domestic nett of ₹10.73 crore in 1993 equivalent to ₹184.37 crore in 2016.) (Note: See Box office § Average ticket price.)
Main Khiladi Tu Anari	1994	₹13.84 crore ($4.41 million)	₹180.47 crore (US$19 million)	11.092 million	(Note: Inflation rate of 13.04 times: ₹7.88 crore domestic nett equivalent to ₹102.73 crore in 2016.)
Sabse Bada Khiladi	1995	₹16.06 crore ($5 million)	₹188.22 crore (US$20 million)	11.897 million	(Note: Inflation rate of 11.72 times: ₹9.4 crore domestic nett equivalent to ₹110.19 crore in 2016.)
Khiladiyon Ka Khiladi	1996	₹25.16 crore ($7.1 million)	₹259.9 crore (US$27 million)	16.042 million	(Note: Inflation rate of 10.33 times: ₹14.39 crore domestic nett equivalent to ₹148.58 crore in 2016.)
Mr. and Mrs. Khiladi	1997	₹16.75 crore ($4.61 million)	₹141.04 crore (US$15 million)	8.515 million	(Note: Inflation rate of 8.42 times: ₹9.37 crore domestic nett equivalent to ₹78.87 crore in 2016.)
International Khiladi	1999	₹16.19 crore ($3.8 million)	₹125.31 crore (US$13 million)	7.419 million	(Note: Inflation rate of 7.74 times: ₹8.88 crore domestic nett equivalent to ₹68.71 crore in 2016.)
Khiladi 420	2000	₹10.2 crore ($2.3 million)	₹67.22 crore (US$7.0 million)	4.095 million	(Note: Inflation rate of 6.59 times: ₹5.76 crore domestic nett equivalent to ₹37.93 crore in 2016.)
Khiladi 786	2012	₹97.05 crore ($18.16 million)	₹155 crore (US$16 million)	9.432 million	(Note: ₹97.05 crore (equivalent to ₹183 crore or US$19 million in 2023).)
Total		₹199 crore ($46.83 million)	₹1,181.59 crore (US$120 million)	72.892 million+	

=== Soundtrack albums ===
Soundtrack album	Year	Sales	Source
Khiladi	1992	3,000,000	
Main Khiladi Tu Anari	1994	3,350,000	
Khiladiyon Ka Khiladi	1996	2,000,000	
Total		8,350,000	

== Television series ==
Fear Factor: Khatron Ke Khiladi is an Indian stunt/dare reality game show based on Fear Factor. The series was first launched as Fear Factor India on Sony TV in 2006; however, the channel discontinued the series after one season. The channel gave up its rights to Colors and the series was relaunched as Fear Factor: Khatron Ke Khiladi on 21 July 2008.

Each season of the show has been hosted by popular Bollywood stars. The first two seasons were hosted by Akshay Kumar. He was replaced by former Miss World and actress Priyanka Chopra in the third season due to scheduling conflicts. However, Akshay Kumar was hired again for the fourth season. For season 5, film director Rohit Shetty replaced Akshay Kumar as his wife Twinkle's delivery was due around the same time. For season 7, film actor Arjun Kapoor replaced Rohit Shetty.

Seasons	1 (2008)	2 (2009)	3 (2010)	4 (2011)	5 (2014)	6 (2015)	7 (2016)	8 (2017)	9 (2019)	10 (2020)	Made in India (2020)	11 (2021)
Host	Akshay Kumar		Priyanka Chopra	Akshay Kumar	Rohit Shetty		Arjun Kapoor	Rohit Shetty				
Winner	Nethra Raghuraman	Anushka Manchanda	Shabbir Ahluwalia	Aarti Chhabria	Rajneesh Duggal	Aashish Chaudhary	Sidharth Shukla	Shantanu Maheshwari	Punit Pathak	Karishma Tanna	Nia Sharma	Arjun Bijlani
Runner-up	Urvashi Sharma	Jesse Randhawa	Ritwik Bhattacharya	Mauli Dave	Gurmeet Choudhary	Meiyang Chang	Sana Saeed	Hina Khan	Aditya Narayan	Karan Patel	Karan Wahi	Divyanka Tripathi
