= Subbiraj =

Indian actor

Subbiraj Kakkar
- Born: Subbiraj Kakkar
- Died: July 2007; Mumbai
- Other names: Subbi Raj, Subhi Raj, Subi Raj, Suvi Raj, Subbiraaj, Suberaj, Subhiraaj, Subhiraj, Subiraaj, Subiraj
- Occupation: Actor
- Notable work: Ek Ruka Hua Faisla
- Spouse: Kumari Naaz

Subbiraj Kakkar popularly known as Subbiraj was an Indian character actor in Hindi-language films and television. His maternal uncle was veteran actor Prithviraj Kapoor and thus Raj Kapoor, Shammi Kapoor and Shashi Kapoor were his cousins.

== Career ==
His debut film was "Do Gunde". At that time he was working as the Studio Manager of famous R.K.Studio of the Kapoor family.

Subbiraj was well known for his acting in Hindi cinema mainly as a character artist. He was best known for his acting performance in the film “Ek Ruka Hua Faisla” released in 1986 in which he has acted in the role of “Juror no Ten” as an arrogant, hypocrite, foul-mouthed, and aggressive businessman. This film was the remake of Sidney Lumet movie “Twelve Angry Men.” He got the acclamation of both the critics and the audience for his acting in this movie. In 1991 he featured in another movie named as “Maa Ki Mamta” which was also a big hit. His other popular films include "Khiladi 420" in 2000, "International Khiladi" in 1999, "Ram Aur Shyam" in 1996.

== Personal life ==
His father was the studio manager of R K Studios.

He married the actress Baby Naaz, of the Boot Polish movie fame, a classic of Raj Kapoor in 1954 who had received a distinction award at the 1955 Cannes Film Festival for her role in Boot Polish. She was his co-star in "Dekha Pyaar Tumhara" in 1963 and "Mera Ghar Mere Bachhe" in 1965. They have a son called Girish and daughter called Gauri who are not associated with the Indian Film Industry.

== Death ==
Subbiraj died in July 2007. Baby Naaz died before him in 1995.

== Filmography ==
Year	Film	Character/Role
2009	Sanam Teri Kasam	Dr. Kapoor
2007	Ghutan	Dharrampal
2005	Ab Tumhari Bari	
2000	Khiladi 420	Judge
2000	Mela (as Subhi Raj)	
2000	Bharat India Hindustan	
2000	Raat Rani	
1999	Jahan Tum Le Chalo	
1999	Kartoos	Mini's prospective father-in-law
1999	International Khiladi	S.P. Sharma (as Subiraj)
1998	Khote Sikkey	Senior Police Officer (as Suvi Raj)
1998	Mohabbat Aur Jung	Police Commissioner
1998	Jiyaala	Principal
1998	Salaakhen	Committee Member
1997	Aflatoon	College principal (as Subiraj)
1997	Police Station	School Master
1997	Agni Morcha	
1996	Papi Gudia	Commissioner of Police (as Subhiraaj)
1996	Ajay	Anjali's Father-in-law
1996	Ram Aur Shyam	Scientist (as Subi Raj)
1996	Shohrat	
1996	Mafia	Acharya
1996	Agni Sakshi	Mr. Kapoor (Father)
1995	Fauji	Inspector General of Police
1995	Anokha Andaaz	Principal
1995	Ram Shastra	Judge
1995	Sabse Bada Khiladi	Police Commissioner Sinha (uncredited)
1995	Aaj Ka Maseeha	
1994	Do Fantoosh	Veerendra's chacha
1994	Sangdil Sanam	Vimla's husband
1994	Aao Pyaar Karen	Anjali's husband
1994	Gangster	
1994	Andaz	Col. Anand Viraj (uncredited)
1994	Khuddar	Father of Adarsh Vardhan (Uncredited) seen only in photo frame
1994	Tejasvini	Havaldar Trilochan
1994	Dilwale	Vikram's dad
1994	Elaan	Senior Police Officer (uncredited)
1994	Sehme Huye Sitaare	
1993	Aakanksha	Deshbandhu
1993	Pyar Pyar	Agarwal
1993	Insaaf Ka Khoon	Public Prosecutor
1993	Raunaq	Jagjit Singh Parwana (as Subiraj)
1993	Meri Aan	Ashfaque Khan's father-in-law
1993	Parwane	Principal - Gokhale College (as Subiraj)
1993	Anari	Raj Jyotish
1993	Lootere	Commissioner
1992	Jai Kaali	
1992	Anaam	Dr. Bhardwaj (as Subiraj)
1992	Apradhi	Dhanraj
1992	Sone Ki Lanka	Mohit's foster father
1992	Ek Ladka Ek Ladki	Estate Lawyer (as Subbi Raj)
1992	Zindagi Ek Juaa (as Subiraaj)	
1992	Mr. Bond	Sunita's father (as Subiraj)
1992	Vansh	Geeta's potential in-law (as Subhiraaj)
1992	Dil Ka Kya Kasoor	College Principal (as Subhiraj)
1992	Vajraghat	
1991	Insaaf Ka Khoon	Prosecuting Attorney
1991	Narasimha	Doctor
1991	Lakshmanrekha	Lawyer
1991	Kurbaan	Gupta (as Subbi Raj)
1991	Anar	
1991	Aur Dhol Bajta Raha	
1991	Pyar Ka Saudagar	Maria's father
1990	Awwal Number	Police Commissioner Patil
1990	Karishma Kali Kaa	2nd Police Commissioner
1990	Pathar Ke Insan	Rai Bahadur Dina Nath (as Subi Raj)
1990	Thanedaar	Police Commissioner (uncle) (as Subhiraj)
1990	Gunahon Ka Devta	Police Inspector Verma
1990	Kroadh	Mehta - Public Prosecutor (Bombay)
1990	Aulad Ke Khatir	
1989	Mahaadev	Thakur Sujan Singh
1989	Shehzaade	Shanti Bhai (uncredited)
1989	Tridev	Judge Saxena (as Subiraj)
1989	Apna Desh Paraye Log	
1989	Touhean	The Judge
1989	Khooni Murdaa	Advocate Palkhiwala (as Subiraj)
1989	Maut Ka Elaan (TV movie)	
1989	Saaya	Prosecuting Lawyer (uncredited)
1988	Zulm Ko Jala Doonga	Judge
1988	Ram-Avtar	Sangeeta's father (as Suberaj)
1988	O Bharya Katha (Telugu movie)	Heeralal
1988	Be Lagaam	
1987	Zevar	Shambhu Nath (as Subiraj)
1987	Kaash	Director of the school
1987	Muqaddar Ka Faisla	Murari
1987	Satyamev Jayate	Police Commissioner Prithvi Singh (as Subbiraaj)
1987	Imaandaar	Sudhir
1987	Pratighaat	Laxmi's father
1986	Ek Ruka Hua Faisla (TV movie)	Juror #10
1986	Kala Dhanda Goray Log	Senior Police Officer
1986	Kirayadar	Advocate (as Subiraj)
1986	Pahunchey Huwe Log	
1986	Anaar	
1986	Sone Ka Pinjra (video)	
1985	Alag Alag	Neeraj's father
1984	Lakhon Ki Baat	Editor Bharucha (as Subiraj)
1983	Pasand Apni Apni	Ismail (as Subiraj)
1983	Dard-E-Dil	Jamnadas
1983	Jaani Dost	Dharamraj Singh
1983	Sun Meri Laila	David
1982	Sun Sajna	
1980	Jazbaat	Ram Mohan
1980	Qatil Kaun	Lalu
1977	Niyaz Aur Namaaz	Qawwali singer
1969	Raja Saab	Kunver Gurbahadur Singh (as Subiraj)
1967	Chhaila Babu	Raju
1964	Ishaara	Deep (as Subi Raj)
1963	Dekha Pyaar Tumhara	
1961	Bada Aadmi (as Subiraj)	
1961	Salaam Memsaab	
1961	Walait Pass	Ajeet (as Subi Raj)
1960	Mera Ghar Mere Bachche	Narendra
1959	C.I.D. Girl	Suraj
1959	Do Gunde	

== Television ==
Year	Show	Character/Role
2000	Chattaan (TV series)	
1999	Viraasat (TV series)	
1993–1998	Parampara (TV series)	
1991	Maa Ki Mamta (TV series)	
1990	Peechha Karo (TV miniseries)	
1985–86	Paying Guest (TV series)	Krishnakant Trivedi
