= Sabse Bada Khiladi =

1995 Indian film by Umesh Mehra

- Theatrical release poster
- Directed by: Umesh Mehra
- Written by: Umesh Mehra; Ved Prakash Sharma
- Based on: Lallu by Ved Prakash Sharma
- Produced by: Keshu Ramsay
- Starring: Akshay Kumar; Mamta Kulkarni; Mohnish Behl; Gulshan Grover; Aruna Irani; Sadashiv Amrapurkar
- Cinematography: S. Pappu
- Edited by: Kamal Saigal
- Music by: Songs: Rajesh Roshan; Background Score: Raju Singh
- Production companies: D.M.S. Films; Eros Entertainment
- Distributed by: Time Magnetics
- Release date: June 9, 1995 (India)
- Country: India
- Language: Hindi
- Budget: ₹4 crore
- Box office: ₹16.05 crore

Sabse Bada Khiladi (transl. The Biggest Player) is a 1995 Indian action thriller film directed by Umesh Mehra and starring Akshay Kumar, Mamta Kulkarni, Mohnish Behl, Gulshan Grover, Aruna Irani, and Sadashiv Amrapurkar. It was the third installment in the Khiladi film series of films that had Akshay in the lead after Khiladi and Main Khiladi Tu Anari and was the first Khiladi film to be directed by Umesh Mehra and produced by Keshu Ramsay who went on to collaborate for Khiladiyon Ka Khiladi and International Khiladi. The film was a huge commercial success at the box office and was the seventh highest-grossing Indian film of 1995.

The story of the film is loosely adapted from the novel called Lallu by Ved Prakash Sharma, a Hindi pulp fiction writer. Sharma is credited during the opening credits.

== Plot ==
Lallu is an orphan who was separated from his parents and brother in his childhood and has been brought up by foster parents. He travels to Vizag to look for a job and starts working as a loyal servant for rich businessman Jamna Das. One day he discovers Jamna Das's daughter Sunita drunk in a nightclub and takes her home. Jamna Das realises how loyal Lallu is and how he never took advantage of Sunita in her drunken state and decides to get them married. Sunita immediately refuses as she is in love with Amit. When Jamna Das suddenly dies of a heart attack, his will and testament reveal that Sunita must marry Lallu or she will not be entitled to any of his wealth and estate. Seeing no other option, she marries Lallu but decides to have him killed with the help of Amit so that she can inherit all of her father's wealth. Sunita and Amit succeed in their plan to kill Lallu by poisoning him, putting him into a car, and crashing it to make it look like an accident. His death is considered suspicious, and the case is assigned to Inspector Vijay Kumar, who is a lookalike of the supposedly deceased Lallu.

Vijay also has a twin brother Ajay, whom he lost during childhood. His brother was apparently murdered by Amit's father, Amar Singh, and the latter had raped a close friend's wife, who was Jamna Das's wife, Gomti. Later Gomti dies of a heart attack when in court Amar Singh (as a lawyer) falsely proves his 'innocence' and renders her guilty. This fact is not known by Sunita. But Vijay swears revenge against Amar Singh for what he did.

The twist in the story comes when Lallu appears before Sunita and Amit, who have presumed him to be dead. He then terrorizes them at their house and, when Amit finally owns up to the crime. The police immediately arrest Amit and Sunita. Lallu says he is none other than Inspector Vijay Kumar. Vijay reveals that it was his plan to frame Amit and his father. It was he who had come as Lallu in the first place, told Jamna Das to enact the heart attack, took Sunita into confidence, done all the pretence, and finally, they had gotten Amit into trouble. Because now Amit is guilty of 'murdering Lallu', Inspector Kekda, a cunning inspector who had helped cover the crime, is also arrested.

Amit is taken into custody. Amar and Kekda hatch a plan to release Amit and send him out of the country. They go to Vijay's police station on the pretext of meeting Amit, and, as part of a plan hatched by Amar, a fight breaks out near the station, to which Vijay responds. At that moment, they release Amit, knock Kekda out, and immolate him after Amit exchanges clothes with him. By the time Vijay realises what's happening, it is too late. Amit escapes to the airport; Amar goes to court and accuses Vijay of burning his son. But Vijay manages to save Kekda. He then says that Vijay is the biggest player ('Sabse Bada Khiladi') and helps Vijay nab Amit.

Vijay chases Amit all the way to the abandoned airport with Kekda in hot pursuit in a helicopter. Eventually, they destroy many stationary aircraft and the entire hangar, with both chasing and trying to kill each other through the raging fires. Amit shoots Kekda in the chopper from his car. But Vijay manages to nab him.

Finally, they reach court, where Vijay produces Amit, the dead Kekda, and everything is out in the open. Amar Singh is now forced to say that he was the one who killed Lallu and raped Gomti, to save his son. Fortunately, he is not able to prove all this as he had already destroyed all the evidence. A frustrated Amar Singh tries to shoot Vijay but fails, and both he and Amit are arrested.

== Cast ==
- Akshay Kumar as Lallu / Inspector Vijay Kumar (dual role)
- Mamta Kulkarni as Sunita Das
- Mohnish Behl as Amit Singh Choudhury
- Aruna Irani as Suchitra Das, Sunita's mother.
- Avtar Gill as Jamna Das, Sunita's father.
- Anjana Mumtaz as Gomti Das
- Anil Nagrath as Judge Roopchand
- Kishore Bhanushali as Havildar Barkat Ali
- Sudhir Dalvi as Doctor Raja Pratap
- Dina Pathak as Dhristi ,Jamna's mother
- Vishwajeet Pradhan as Chika
- Mohan Raman as a Defense lawyer Harshad
- Gulshan Grover as Senior Inspector K.Kekada
- Sadashiv Amrapurkar as Amar Singh Choudhary

== Music ==
The Music was composed by Rajesh Roshan, and the background score was made by Raju Singh. The track "Mukaala Mukaabla" was based on 1994 Tamil song from film Kaadhalan. The song Bholi Bhali Ladki is the copy of The Scorpion's 1983 song 'Still Loving You'. Lyricist of all songs is Dev Kohli.

Track listing
No.	Title	Playback	Length
1.	"Bholi Bhali Ladki"	Kumar Sanu, Alka Yagnik	05:35
2.	"Bharo Maang Meri Bharo"	Abhijeet Bhattacharya, Jyoti	07:51
3.	"Mukkala Muqabala Hoga"	Kumar Sanu, Alka Yagnik	05:21
4.	"Lover's"	Alisha Chinai	6:24
5.	"Zehar Hai Ye Pyar Hai"	Kumar Sanu	05:19
6.	"Har Dil Mein Hai Rab Basta"	Kumar Sanu	05:33
7.	"Tu Hai Aandhi"	Abhijeet Bhattacharya, Sadhana Sargam	05:20
Total length:			41:20
