= Komal Shahani =

Indian costume fashion designer and entrepreneur

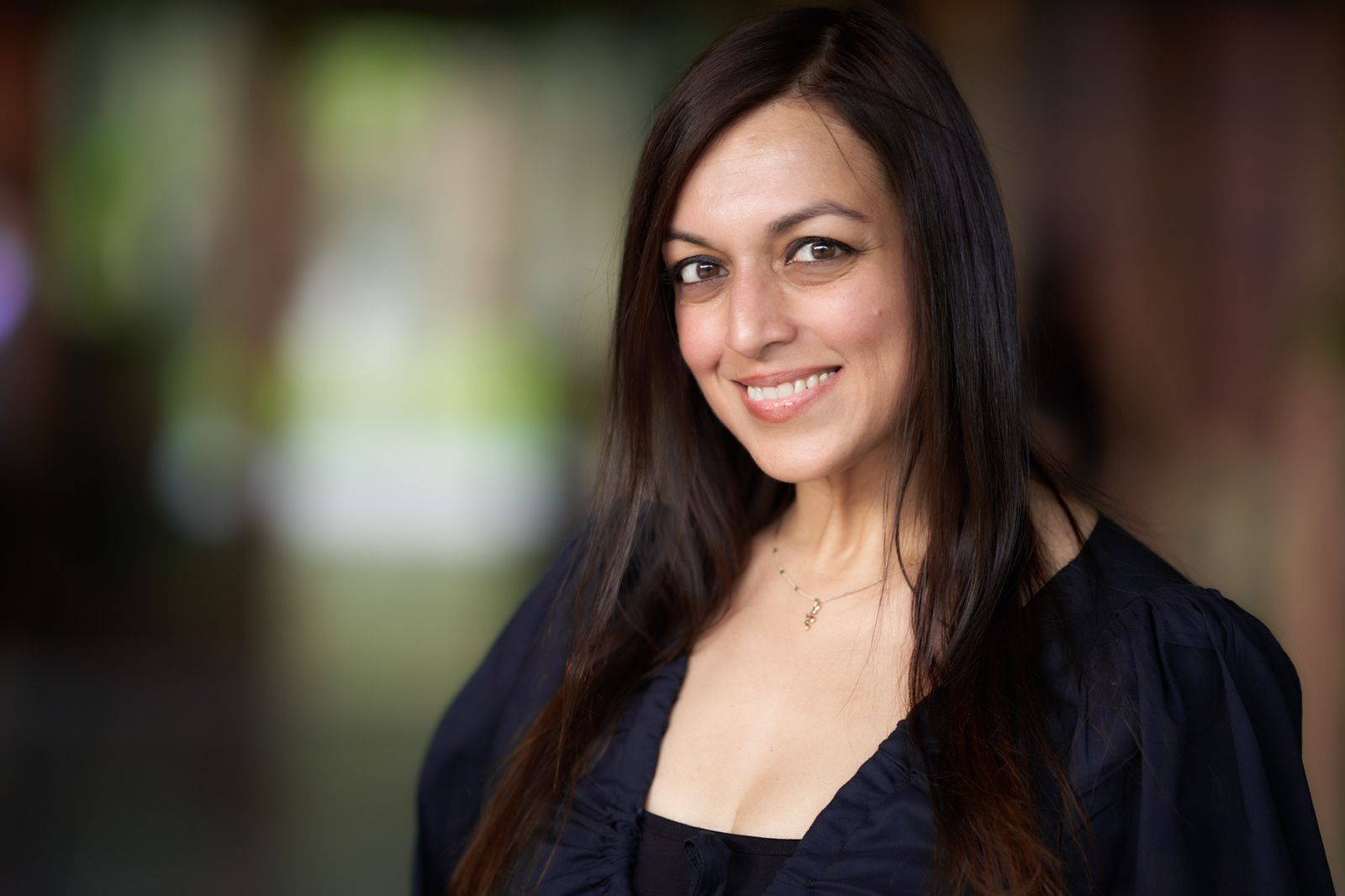
- Born: 9 December; Mumbai, Maharashtra, India
- Occupations: fashion costume designer, celebrity stylist
- Known for: Fashion Director /Stylist Costume Designer
- Spouse: Ashish R. Mohan

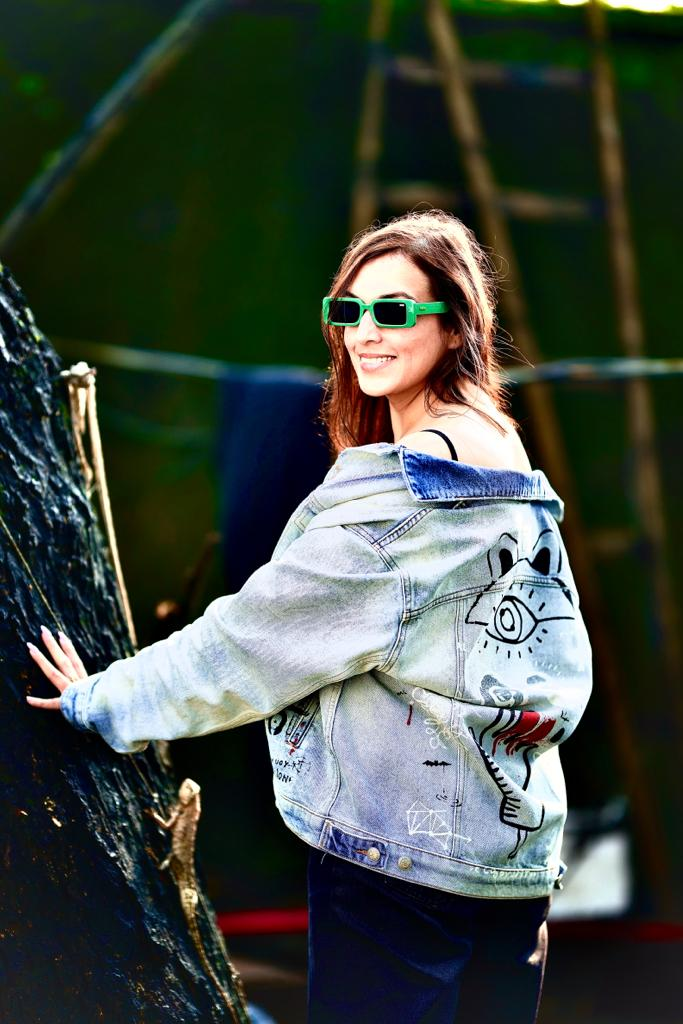
Profile photo

Komal Shahani is an Indian fashion costume designer, who has worked in the Hindi, Tamil, and Telugu film industries for over a decade.

== Career ==
Komal Shahani began her career as a designer for Mischief Boutique soon after completing her studies. She made her debut as a stylist in the film Koi... Mil Gaya (2003), where she styled Preity Zinta. She styled Neha Dhupia for the Miss Universe pageant and various fashion and Bollywood magazines to establish herself in the fashion industry. Komal made her bilingual film debut in the 2011 movie 180 set in Chennai and San Francisco. Later on, she met AR Murugadoss who gave her the opportunity to work in Thuppakki (2012). She has extensively worked with Vijay and has styled him in several films, including Thuppakki, Jilla, Theri, Mersal and Bigil. For Welcome 2 Karachi (2015), Komal sourced embroidered leather Baloch jutis, mirrorwork Muslim caps, headscarves, turbans, and military uniforms of U.S., Indian, and Pakistani personnel for the entire cast. Notably, for Cobra (2022), Komal Shahani designed actor Vikram's seven distinct looks in the film. She has worked on several advertisements featuring Aishwarya Rai Bachchan, Akshay Kumar and for brands such as Lodha, Kurkure and Sting. She has also styled Akshay Kumar for films such as Khiladi 786, Boss and his recent film Selfiee. Komal has currently signed an international project titled Dear Jassi (2023) with director Tarsem Singh and another with director Balaji Mohan starring Amala Paul.

== Personal life ==
Komal Shahani is married to Hindi film director Ashish R. Mohan. The pair were married in a ceremony in February 2012 attended by several Hindi film personalities.

== Filmography ==
- Koi... Mil Gaya
- Qayamat: City Under Threat
- Elaan
- Garam Masala
- Kyon Ki
- Chup Chup Ke
- Dor
- Aryan
- Raqeeb
- Darling
- Athidhi
- My Name is Anthony Gonsalves
- De Taali
- Welcome to Sajjanpur
- One Two Three
- Toonpur Ka Superhero
- Powder
- Paathshaala
- Aakrosh
- 180
- Bittoo Boss
- Thuppakki
- Khiladi 786
- Boss
- Jilla
- Irumbu Kuthirai
- Arima Nambi
- Welcome 2 Karachi
- Maari
- Theri
- Mersal
- Bigil
- Cobra
- Selfiee
- Dear Jassi
- Untitled Balaji Mohan movie starring Amala Paul

== Awards and nominations ==
Year	Award	Category	Film	Result
2007	National Film Awards	Best Costume Design	Dor	Nominated
2007	Filmfare Awards	Best Costume Design	Dor	Nominated
2010	National Film Awards	Best Costume Design	Aakrosh	Nominated
2017	Ananda Vikatan Cinema Awards	Best Costume Designer	Mersal	Won
