= Mauka =

Mauka can refer to different things

- Mauka Mauka, an Indian television advertisement campaign
- Mauka (gastropod), a subgenus of snail in the genus Philonesia
- Mirabilis expansa, a plant and vegetable which has the common name of 'mauka'

== See also ==
- Mawk'allaqta (disambiguation), several archaeological sites in Peru
- Mauka Taray, another archaeological site in Peru
- Mililani Mauka, Hawaii
- 'ohe mauka, common name for Polyscias oahuensis, a Hawaiʻian tree
