= Vajraghat =

1992 Hindi film

Vajraghat is a Hindi-language action drama film directed by Rajan Thakur. This film was released in 1992. Ravindra Jain was the music composer of this film. The film stars Gulshan Grover and Sudhir Dalvi.

== Cast ==
- Gulshan Grover
- Sudhir Dalvi
- Shiva Rindani
- Tom Alter
- Urmila Bhatt
- Subbiraj
- Mahesh Raj
- Pawan Gulati
- Sanjeeva
- Reshmi
- Bhanu Jain
