= Ved Prakash Sharma =

Indian writer

- Born: 10 June 1955; Meerut, Uttar Pradesh, India
- Died: 17 February 2017 (aged 61); Meerut, Uttar Pradesh, India
- Occupations: Novelist, scriptwriter

Ved Prakash Sharma (10 June 1955 – 17 February 2017) was an Indian writer of novels and screenplays in Hindi. He was born in Meerut, Uttar Pradesh, where he completed his graduation from NAS Degree College. After beginning his professional career as a ghost writer, he went on to write 176 novels (ghostwriting around 23 novels of them). Dahekte Shaher (1973) was the first novel for which he was credited. He primarily wrote detective novels, among them Kalyug ki Ramayan and Vardi Wala Gunda were his famous works. The main characters in his detective novels were Vijay, Vikas, Raghunath, Alphanse, Vibha Jindal, Keshav Pandit and Raina.

From the mid 80s to 2001 he authored several novels with themes of social issues, intrigue in relationships, mercenary motives, greed, betrayal, affairs and conspiracy. These stories contained many plot twists and surprises in the end, and were well received by readers. In the 1990s he was considered the top novelist of the genre. According to his Times of India obituary, his 1992 novel Vardi Wala Gunda "broke all records and sold 15 lakh copies on the very first day of its release", while it reported overall sales of "80 million copies".

Sharma also made several contributions to Bollywood, the Hindi film industry in India. His novel Bahu Maange Insaaf was adapted for film Bahu Ki Awaaz in 1985, while Anaam (1992) too was based on his work. Sharma also contributed to two installments in the Khiladi series of Akshay Kumar films—Sabse Bada Khiladi (1995) and International Khiladi (1999). In 2010 Zee TV aired Keshav Pandit, a series based on the character created by Sharma. He founded Tulsi Comics and also created few comic characters like Jambu.

Sharma was awarded the Meerut Ratna twice (1992 and 1994). He had received various state-level awards including the Natraj Bhushan Award in 2008 and the Natraj Award in 1995.
