= Ram-Avtar =

Ram–Avtar
- Theatrical release poster
- Directed by: Sunil Hingorani
- Screenplay by: Khalid Siddiqui
- Dialogues by: Anwar Khan
- Story by: Khalid Siddiqui
- Based on: Sangam (1964) by Raj Kapoor
- Produced by: Anil Hingorani
- Starring: Sunny Deol; Anil Kapoor; Sridevi
- Cinematography: A. K. Bir
- Edited by: Ashok Honda
- Music by: Laxmikant–Pyarelal
- Production company: Kapleshwar Productions
- Distributed by: Kapleshwar Productions
- Release date: 20 May 1988
- Running time: 170 min.
- Country: India
- Language: Hindi

Ram–Avtar is a 1988 movie starring Sunny Deol, Anil Kapoor and Sridevi. It was directed by Sunil Hingorani, written by Khalid Siddiqui, and produced by Anil Hingorani. It is a remake of the Raj Kapoor, Rajendra Kumar and Vyjayanthimala-starrer Sangam (1964).

== Plot ==
Ram–Avtar is a poignant drama exploring the complex themes of love, friendship, and sacrifice. The story centers on two inseparable childhood best friends, Ram and Avtar, whose bond is tested when they both fall for the same woman, Sangeeta.

Avtar, a charming but often troublesome character, finds employment in Sangeeta's organization, which she runs in her village. He soon develops romantic feelings for her. However, Sangeeta is frequently harassed by the villainous local landlord, Gundappaswami. To protect herself and her business, she hires Avtar for muscle. Meanwhile, the more grounded and self-sacrificing Ram returns from abroad after furthering his studies.

Ram and Sangeeta meet and after few skirmishes, fall in love. Their budding romance blossoms until Ram realizes the devastating truth: his best friend, Avtar, is also deeply in love with Sangeeta. True to his giving nature and prioritizing his lifelong friendship, Ram makes the painful decision to sacrifice his own love for the sake of Avtar's happiness. He steps aside and actively works to facilitate Sangeeta's marriage to Avtar, concealing the deep, mutual feelings he and Sangeeta share. While Sangeeta loves Ram, she goes through with the marriage to Avtar.

The marriage, however, is not a happy one. Avtar's insecurities and jealousy start to surface, particularly when he is poisoned by Gundappaswami's machinations. On his deathbed, a vengeful Gundappaswami, seeking to destroy the friends, tells Avtar that his wife, Sangeeta, is a woman of questionable character. The enemy's words sow deep seeds of doubt in Avtar's mind, leading him to suspect Sangeeta's fidelity after the villain's death.

As suspicion and marital unhappiness plague their life, Sangeeta finds herself desperate and calls upon Ram for help, putting Ram in an impossible position. His presence only heightens Avtar's paranoia, threatening to destroy the marriage Ram sacrificed everything to create. In a tragic and emotional climax, the truth about Ram and Sangeeta's past love is finally revealed to Avtar. Distraught by the revelation and the damage his suspicion has caused, Avtar attempts to commit suicide by drinking poison. Ram intervenes and, in an ultimate act of selfless friendship and sacrifice, saves Avtar's life by donating all of his blood, thus sacrificing his own life to ensure Avtar's survival and, finally, uniting Avtar and Sangeeta with a clear conscience. Ram's death becomes the ultimate testament to his friendship, leaving behind an indelible mark on the lives of Avtar and Sangeeta.

== Cast ==
- Sunny Deol as Ram, Sangeeta's boyfriend, Avtar's friend.
- Anil Kapoor as Avtar, Ram's friend, eventually Sangeeta's husband.
- Sridevi as Sangeeta, Ram's girlfriend, eventually Avtar's wife.
- Shakti Kapoor as Gundappaswami
- Bharat Bhushan as Ram's Grandfather
- Subbiraj as Sangeeta's father
- Yunus Parvez as Sangeeta's Accountant
- Dinesh Hingoo as Gangiya
- Master Keval Shah as Young Ram
- Master Vikas as Young Avtar
- Manik Irani as Markoni

== Music and soundtrack ==
Laxmikant–Pyarelal provided the music and the lyrics were penned by Anand Bakshi.

#	Title	Singer(s)
1	"Anguli Mein Angoothi"	Mohammad Aziz, Lata Mangeshkar
2	"Na Na Karte"	Mohammad Aziz, Udit Narayan, Anuradha Paudwal
3	"Ek Duje Ke Vaste" 1	Mohammad Aziz, Manhar Udhas
4	"Teri Bewafai Ka Shikwa"	Mohammad Aziz
5	"Nigore Mardon Ka"	Anuradha Paudwal
6	"Anguli Mein Angoothi" Part 1	Mohammad Aziz, Lata Mangeshkar
7	"Anguli Mein Angoothi" Part 2	Lata Mangeshkar
8	""Anguli Mein Angoothi" Part 3	Mohammad Aziz
9	"Ek Duje Ke Vaaste" (part 2)	Manhar Udhas
10	"Ek Duje Ke Vaaste" (part 3)	Kavita Krishnamurthy
