= Amrit Pal (actor) =

Indian actor

Amrit Pal (c. 1941 – 2017) was an Indian actor. He died in Malad, Mumbai on 19 June 2017, aged 76.

== Selected filmography ==
- Kala Bazar (1960) as member in Dev Anand gang
- Zanjeer (1973) as Tejaa Henchman
- Himalay Se Ooncha (1975) as Nawab
- Teesra Patthar (1976)
- Main Papi Tum Bakhshanhaar (1976) as Rudhumal
- Saal Solvan Chadya (1977)
- Zakhmon Ke Nishan (1980)
- Insaan (1982)
- Horký podzim s vuní manga (1984) as Rádz
- Inteha (1984) as Jaggi
- Mashaal (1984) as Amrit Casino Manager
- Bud Naseeb (1986)
- Badkaar (1986) as Dharmesh Yogi
- Jaal (1986) as Bhanu Pratap Singh
- Africadalli Sheela (1986) as African Warrior
- Pyaar Ke Do Pal (1986) as Amrit
- Avinash (1986) as Pratap's Associate
- Aadamkhor (1986) as Major Chhabra
- Hiraasat (1987) as Amrit Pal - Rajesh's boss
- Jai Karoli Maa (1988)
- Kasam (1988) as Dharia
- Waaris (1988) as Sarpanch Gurusharan Singh
- Som Mangal Shani (1988) as Daku Rupa
- Geeta Ki Saugandh (1988)
- Aakhri Adaalat (1988) as Milkman who saw the mystery killer
- Mahakali (1988)
- Guru (1989) as Manu
- Meri Zabaan (1989) as Jeeva
- Batwara (1989) as Farmer, Jinna Brother
- Hisaab Khoon Ka (1989) as Suraj's grand father
- Sikka (1989) as Ship's Captain
- Ladaai (1989) as Nissar Khan
- Choron Ki Rani Hasino Ka Raja (1990)
- Aaj Ke Shahenshah (1990)
- Veeru Dada (1990) as Mahadev
- Shera Shamshera (1990) as Zoravar Singh
- Princess from Kathmandu (1991)
- Andha Sach (1991) as Lala
- Aaj Ka Inteqaam (1991)
- Begunaah (1991) as Kumar
- Farishtay (1991) as Gulshanchandra /Cockroach
- Lakshmanrekha (1991) as Balli
- Taakre Jattan De (1991) as Chaudhary Shamsher Singh
- Shikari (1991) as Hari Singh
- Jungle Beauty (1991) as Kabeela Sardar
- Khooni Dracula (1992)
- Zulm Ki Hukumat (1992) as Tandiya
- Pardesi (1993) as Biharilal Bajaj
- Dhartiputra (1993) as Judge
- Dushmani Jattan Di (1993) as Mehnga Singh
- Jaan Per Khel Kar (1993)
- Aashik Awara (1993) as Deva Singh
- Yaar Gaddar (1994)
- Kachehari (1994) as Ajeet's Maama
- Gopalaa (1994)
- Karmon Kee Sazaa (1995) as Chaudhary Saheb
- Aatank Hi Aatank (1995) as Zameendar
- Veergati (1995) as Abu
- Ram Jaane (1995) as Mirchi
- Khel Taqdeeran De (1995)
- Dushmani: A Violent Love Story (1995)
- 7 Days (1995) as Nawab Chhote Kunwar
- Border (1997)
- Betaabi (1997)
- Om Namah Shivay (1997, TV Series)
- Jungle Love Story (1998)
- 24 Ghante (1998)
- Maharaja (1998)
- Zimbo (1999)
- Shankar Shambu (1999)
- Khooni No.1 (1999)
- Aadhi Raat (1999)
- Kothewali (2000)
- Zakhmi Sherni (2001)
- Woh Kaun Thi (2001)
- Shaheed E Kargil (2001)
- Main Hoon Qatil Jaadugarni (2001)
- Kunwari Chudail (2001)
- Bhooka Sher (2001)
- Taqdeer Ka Sikander (2002)
- Raaz Hi Raaz (2002)
- Daulat Ki Hawas (2002)
- Yeh Kaise Chahat Hain (2003)
- Woh Hain Gumnaam (2003)
- Stumped (2003) as Laltu Singh
- Asa Nu Maan Watna Da: In Search of Our Roots (2004)
- Chaska: An Addiction (2006)
- Valley of Flowers (2006) as Yeti's Patrol
- Apne (2007)
- Chakk De Phatte (2008) as Sabharwal Saab
- Jatt Airways (2013) as Lambu
- Resham Dunkkk (2013)
- 47 to 84: Hun Main Kisnu Watan Kahunga (2014) as Advocate
- Punjab 1984 (2014) as Man at encounter place
- Sardaar Ji (2015) as Chundi
- Palki (2016) as Inspector
- Phillauri (2017) as Raju (final film role)
