= Kahin Pyaar Na Ho Jaaye =

2000 Indian film by K. Murali Mohana Rao

- Directed by: K. Murali Mohana Rao
- Written by: Sanjay Chhel, Manoj Lalwani, Rajesh Malik, Abbas Hirapurwala
- Produced by: Narendra Bajaj
- Starring: Jackie Shroff; Salman Khan; Rani Mukerji; Raveena Tandon
- Cinematography: Rajan Kinagi
- Edited by: M. Ramkoti
- Music by: Himesh Reshammiya
- Production companies: Venus Records, Siddhi Vinayak Creations
- Distributed by: Eros Multimedia Pvt. Ltd. (Eros International)
- Release date: 17 November 2000
- Running time: 158 minutes
- Country: India
- Language: Hindi
- Budget: ₹7.75 crore
- Box office: ₹13.40 crore

Kahin Pyaar Na Ho Jaaye (transl. Beware, you might fall in love) is a 2000 Indian Hindi-language romantic comedy film starring Jackie Shroff, Salman Khan, Raveena Tandon, Mohnish Bahl, Rani Mukerji, Pooja Batra and Kashmira Shah in ley roles and directed by K. Murali Mohana Rao. It is an Indian adaptation of American film The Wedding Singer starring Adam Sandler and Drew Barrymore.

== Plot ==
The film tells the story of Prem (Salman Khan), a talented and happy-go-lucky singer who earns his livelihood by performing at weddings and functions as part of a small troupe. His parents being long dead, he lives with his married sister Neelu (Kashmera Shah) and has bonded closely with her husband, Vinod (Mohnish Behl).

Prem is in love with Nisha (Raveena Tandon) and their wedding date had been fixed. However, while Prem waits at the altar, Nisha fails to show up on the wedding day. It is revealed that Nisha is now betrothed to marry a rich and successful NRI who lives in the USA. Prem is heartbroken and takes to drinking. As a result, his career suffers. His support and mainstay is his brother-in-law, who understands his situation and empathizes with him.

Priya (Rani Mukerji) moves to the neighbourhood to stay with her cousin Mona (Pooja Batra), an aspiring actress. Priya wants to make a career for herself as a videographer, but her widowed mother (who lives in Pune) wants to see her married and settled into a family. She has only very reluctantly permitted Priya to move to Mumbai for a brief period. Mona, who is friends with Prem's sister, suggests that Priya is accepted into Prem's troupe to do videography for weddings and events. As they work together, Prem starts getting attracted to Priya. However, he does not express his feelings. Priya is also vaguely attracted towards Prem but doesn't know about his feelings for her and thinks he is still in love with Nisha.

Meanwhile, Priya's mother has set her marriage with Rahul (Inder Kumar), a well-settled guy from a decent, US-based family. It turns out that Rahul is none other than the rich guy who Nisha was supposed to marry. It is revealed that Nisha had dumped Prem very unwillingly, and only because she needed money to arrange medical care for her kid brother, who has cancer. The only way to raise funds, was by marrying a wealthy man. When Rahul discovers this, he chooses to pay for the boy's treatment without any strings attached and refuses to marry a girl who was in love with someone else. The boy undergoes his cancer surgery and becomes completely cured. Nevertheless, by this time, Rahul and Priya are engaged to marry each other (as arranged by their parents) and therefore, after the surgery, Nisha thinks of returning to Prem.

Nisha reaches Prem's house at a time when Priya is there and the latter surmises, that Nisha wants to get back with Prem. She also assumes that Prem is willing to accept Nisha back because he is now aware of the motivation behind Nisha's previous betrayal. Priya is strangely distraught. She runs immediately to Rahul and demands that he marry her the next day, instead of several months later (as planned by the parents). Meanwhile, Prem confesses to Nisha that things can never be the same between them again and he is a changed man now and is secretly in love with Priya. He bids Nisha good luck and goodbye.

The very next day, Nisha has a business appointment in Agra and catches a flight to that city. On the plane, she bumps into Rahul and Priya. They tell her that they are going to the Taj Mahal for the wedding. Nisha wishes them all the best, and in turn, Priya congratulates Nisha on getting reconciled with Prem and wishes them all the best also. Nisha immediately tells Priya that Prem has rebuffed her and told her that he is in love with someone else but she doesn't know who she is, but Priya immideatly knew that she herself is the girl Prem loves.

Prem and his family (sister and brother-in-law) are also aboard the same flight, trying to stop Priya and Rahul's marriage. Prem sings a meaningful love-song, which Priya realizes is for her. By the time the flight lands in Agra, Prem and Priya are united with each other while Rahul and Nisha also get together with each other.

== Cast ==
- Jackie Shroff as Tiger
- Salman Khan as Prem Kapoor
- Raveena Tandon as Nisha
- Rani Mukerji as Priya Sharma
- Mohnish Behl as Vinod
- Pooja Batra as Mona
- Kashmera Shah as Neelu Kapoor
- Inder Kumar as Rahul Puglia
- Shakti Kapoor as Panditji
- Reema Lagoo as Mrs. Sharma
- Madhur Mittal as Michael
- Baby Gazala

== Soundtrack ==
Kahin Pyaar Na Ho Jaaye

Soundtrack album by Himesh Reshammiya
- Released: 19 September 2000
- Genre: Feature film soundtrack
- Label: Venus Records & Tapes
- Producer: Himesh Reshammiya

Himesh Reshammiya chronology
Kurukshetra (2000)	Kahin Pyaar Na Ho Jaaye (2000)	Jodi No.1 (2001)

All music is composed by Himesh Reshammiya.

No.	Title	Lyrics	Singer(s)	Length
1.	"Kahin Pyar Na Ho Jaaye"	Rajesh Malik	Alka Yagnik, Kumar Sanu	05:19
2.	"Savariya"	Sudhakar Sharma	Alka Yagnik, Kamaal Khan	05:14
3.	"Aa Meri Life"	Rajesh Malik	Kamaal Khan, Sunita Rao	05:04
4.	"O Priya O Priya"	Sudhakar Sharma	Kamaal Khan, Alka Yagnik, Kumar Sanu, Nitin Mukesh	05:50
5.	"Theme"	Rajesh Malik	Sonu Nigam, Alka Yagnik	03:46
6.	"Dhin Tara"	Sudhakar Sharma	Kumar Sanu	05:09
7.	"Pardesi"	Sudhakar Sharma	Sonu Nigam, Alka Yagnik	05:05
8.	"Kahin Pyar Na Ho Jaaye - II"	Rajesh Malik	Kumar Sanu, Alka Yagnik	05:14
9.	"Pardesi - II"	Sudhakar Sharma	Sonu Nigam	02:21
10.	"Parody"	Sudhakar Sharma	Kumar Sanu, Sonu Nigam, Alka Yagnik	10:24

== Release ==
The film was released on 17 Nov 2000. The movie grossed INR 11,30,00,000 in India and INR 13,40,37,500 worldwide.
