= Kasam (1988 film) =

1988 Indian film by Umesh Mehra

- Directed by: Umesh Mehra
- Written by: Javed Siddiqui; Sachin Bhowmick; Umesh Mehra
- Produced by: Indra Kumar; Ashok Thakeria
- Starring: Anil Kapoor; Poonam Dhillon
- Cinematography: S. Pappu
- Edited by: M. S. Shinde
- Music by: Bappi Lahiri
- Production company: Maruti International
- Release date: 15 April 1988
- Country: India
- Language: Hindi

Kasam (transl. Vow) is a 1988 Indian Hindi-language action film directed by Umesh Mehra starring Anil Kapoor, Poonam Dhillon in the lead roles. The film has musical score by Bappi Lahiri.

== Synopsis ==
Inspector Krishna goes undercover to a village so as to infiltrate a drug ring. However, a precarious dacoit who cultivates poppy manages to trap Krishna in a criminal case and throw him behind the bars. Years later, Krishna, upon being freed, pledges to seek vengeance from those who betrayed him.

== Cast ==
- Anil Kapoor as Inspector Kishan Kumar / Krishna
- Poonam Dhillon as Savi
- Kader Khan as Nathu
- Aruna Irani as Gulabo
- Gulshan Grover as Jinda
- Pran as Sardar Mangal Singh
- Satyen Kappu as Police Commissioner Anand Sareen
- Sudhir Dalvi as Inspector General of Police Raja Pratap
- Amrit Pal as Dharia
- Puneet Issar as Paras, Dharia's Henchman
- Adi Irani as Inspector Arun
- Roopesh Kumar as Police Inspector Sameer
- Shammi as Bua
- Johnny Lever as Buddhu
- Guddi Maruti as Buddhu's Wife
- Ketki Dave as Padma
- Viju Khote as South Indian Smuggler
- Anirudh Agarwal as Jeeva, Jinda's Henchman

== Soundtrack ==
| Song | Singer |
|---|---|
| "Garam Garam Pani" | Asha Bhosle |
| "O Kanha, Bajake Bansi Chhed Tarana" | Asha Bhosle, Mohammed Aziz |
| "Kasam Kya Hoti Hai" (Duet) | Asha Bhosle, Nitin Mukesh |
| "Kasam Kya Hoti Hai" | Asha Bhosle |
| "Kasam Kya Hoti Hai" | Nitin Mukesh |
| "Bapuji Bapuji, Mujhe Karne Do Shaadi, Tumne To Kar Liye Maze, Hamen De Do Azaadi" | Mahendra Kapoor, Shabbir Kumar, Chandrani Mukherjee, Uttara Kelkar |
