= Guru (1989 film) =

- Promotional Poster
- Directed by: Umesh Mehra
- Written by: Ram Kelkar; Javed Siddiqui
- Based on: Kaakki Sattai
- Produced by: G. Venkateswaran; R.C.Prakash
- Starring: Mithun Chakraborty; Sridevi
- Music by: Bappi Lahiri
- Production company: Shiv Shakthi Productions Pvt. Ltd. Madras
- Release date: 24 February 1989
- Running time: 165 minutes
- Country: India
- Language: Hindi
- Budget: Rs 5 Crores
- Box office: Rs 13.05 Crores

Guru is a 1989 Indian Hindi-language action film directed by Umesh Mehra, starring Nutan, Mithun Chakraborty, Sridevi and Shakti Kapoor. The film was a huge commercial success. Incidentally, after 14 years, Chakraborty worked in a 2003 film of the same name in Bengali, as well as a 2007 film of the same name, also in Hindi, 18 years later.

The film's plot is based on Kaakki Sattai starring Kamal Haasan, a 1985 Tamil film.

== Summary ==
Gaurav Shankar "Guru" Shrivastav's ambition is to become an upright police officer, but he has not been selected. His sole strength is his lady love Rama. As Guru's ambition fails, he turns to alcohol, dacoity, and thuggism. He finally joins Manu's lethal gang to take revenge on the police force, which blocked his ambition. Uma (Rama's lookalike), is Vicky's important gang member. One day, Vicky gets the confidential message about an undercover cop in his gang.

== Cast ==
- Nutan as Yashoda Shrivastav
- Mithun Chakraborty as Inspector Gaurav Shankar Shrivastav "Guru"
- Sridevi as Rama / Uma (Double Role)
- Shakti Kapoor as Vicky
- Roopesh Kumar as Roopesh
- Amrit Pal as Manu
- Bob Christo as Bob
- Yunus Parvez as Inspector Manchanda
- Arun Bakshi as Inspector Arun
- Sameer Khakhar as Sameer
- Seema Deo as Rama and Uma's Mother
- Sudhir Dalvi as Police Commissioner

== Soundtrack ==
The songs were composed by Bappi Lahiri and penned by Anjaan and Indeevar.The song "I Am Bad Girl" was a chart-topper, "Jaiyo Na Jaiyo Na" and "Ghayal Ghayal" were popular numbers.

Song	Singer
"Daru Kharab"	Kishore Kumar
"Aai Aai Yo"	Asha Bhosle
"Jaiyo Na Jaiyo Na"	Lata Mangeshkar, Shailendra Singh
"I Am Bad Girl"	Alisha Chinai, Shailendra Singh
"Ghayal Ghayal"	Bappi Lahiri, S. Janaki
