= Alamgir Khan (singer) =

Indian playback singer

- Born: 17 March; Patiala, India
- Genres: Classical Singing, Punjabi Singing, Ghazals
- Occupation: Singer

Alamgir Khan (born 17 March) is an Indian playback singer who sings Bollywood, Hindi and Punjabi songs as well as Sufi and Ghazals.He is credited for ad jingle 'Mauka Mauka' conceived for ICC Cricket World Cup by Star Sports.

== Early life and career ==
Alamgir Khan was born in Lalauda village in Nabha city in Patiala district, Punjab. He belongs to a family of traditional folk and classical singers committed to Patiala Gharana and settled in Lalauda village. He started training in classical singing at the age of 14 with his father Ustad Murli Khan, grandfather Ustad Idu Sharif Khan and great grandfather Ustad Karamdeen Khan.

He spent his formative years as an artist in Kalagram residence in Chandigarh. He has also received guidance from the musical maestro and Bollywood playback singer Sukhwinder Singh; Yashwinder Sharma, Programme Officer, North Zone Cultural Centre (NZCC), Kalagram; and standup comedian Khayali Saharan.

He got his first break in the Bollywood films from the music director Himesh Reshammiya who signed hum for 'Desi Beats' in Salman Khan Starrer 'Bodyguard' released in 2011.

== Discography ==
| Song title | Language | Year |
|---|---|---|
| Shakal Pe Mat Ja, Shakal Pe Mat Ja (movie) | Hindi | 2011 |
| Damadamm (Remix), Damadamm (movie) | Hindi | 2011 |
| Desi Beats (Hip-hop Mix), Bodyguard (movie) | Hindi | 2011 |
| Khiladi Bhaiya Khiladi, Khiladi 786 (movie) | Hindi | 2012 |
| Surya Ast Punjabi Mast, Action Jackson (movie) | Hindi | 2014 |
| Tauba Mai Vyah Karke Pachtaya, Shaadi Ke Side Effects (movie) | Hindi | 2014 |
| Bhookamp, Parched (movie) | Hindi | 2015 |
| Tere Bin Nahi Lage Jiya, Ek Paheli-Leela (movie) | Hindi | 2015 |
| Mera Yaar Fantastic, Welcome to Karachi (movie) | Hindi | 2015 |
| MaukaMauka (Advertisement Jingle) | Hindi | 2015 |
| Paag Nu Salamman (Punjabi song) | Punjabi | 2016 |
| Sabse Bada Moh (Advertisement Jingle) | Hindi | 2017 |
| Jai Mata Di, Nanu Ki Jaanu (movie) | Hindi | 2018 |
| Tunu Tunu, Yamla Pagla Deewana: Phir Se (movie) | Hindi | 2018 |
| Fyaar Pe Duniya, Manmarziyaan (movie) | Hindi | 2018 |
| Ishqbaaziyaan, Happy Hardy and Heer (movie) | Hindi | 2020 |

== Achievements ==
Alamgir Khan was featured in the fifth edition of 'Top 30 Under 30' list released by Hindustan Times in 2015.
