= Shaheed-E-Kargil =

2001 Indian Hindi film by Dilip Gulati

- Directed by: Dilip Gulati
- Produced by: Farook
- Distributed by: Fairdeal Films
- Release date: 26 January 2001 (India)
- Country: India
- Language: Hindi

Shaheed-E-Kargil - A True Story is a Hindi war drama film of Bollywood directed by Dilip Gulati and produced by Farook. This movie was released on 26 January 2001 by Fairdeal Films based on Kargil War between India and Pakistan.

== Plot ==
The movie is based on the Kargil armed conflict between Indian and Pakistan that took place between May and July 1999 in the Kargil district of Kashmir.

== Cast ==
- Kiran Kumar as Gorakh
- Raza Murad as Prithvi
- Shehzad Khan as Hamid
- Pramod Moutho as Jumbo
- Amrit Paul as Deva
- Rajeev Raj as Capt Vikas Khanna
- Vijay Solanki as Maj Anand
- Amit Pachori as Maj Sanjay Kapoor

== See more ==
- LOC Kargil
- Border (1997 film)
