= Maseeha =

- DVD Cover
- Directed by: Partho Ghosh
- Written by: Anwar Khan, Praveen Ghatak
- Produced by: Pravin Shah
- Starring: Sunil Shetty; Namrata Shirodkar; Inder Kumar; Mohan Joshi
- Cinematography: Akram Khan
- Edited by: A.R. Rajendran; Aarif Sheikh
- Music by: Songs: Anand Raj Anand; Background Score: Sanjoy Chowdhury
- Production company: Time Magnetics
- Release date: 13 December 2002 (India)
- Running time: 120 mins
- Country: India
- Language: Hindi

Maseeha (transl. Messiah), is a 2002 Indian action drama film written by Pradeep Ghatak and directed by Partho Ghosh. The film stars Sunil Shetty, Mohan Joshi, Mukesh Rishi, Rajpal Yadav, Inder Kumar and Namrata Shirodkar.

== Plot ==
Krishna lives in Shantinagar, a town terrorized by Surajbhan who has close connection with police officers. Krishna is a victim of Surajbhan's atrocities . He vows to end his reign of terror.

== Cast ==
- Suniel Shetty as Krishna a.k.a. Dushman Jaan ka bhi, maal ka bhi.
- Namrata Shirodkar as Pinky, Shiva's love interest and Krishna's sister.
- Inder Kumar as Shiva
- Manek Bedi as Vijay Srivastav
- Rajpal Yadav as Surajbhan's Brother-in-law
- Shiva Rindani as Inspector Thapar
- Mohan Joshi as DCP Srivastav
- Mukesh Rishi as Surajbhan
- Tiku Talsania as Pinky's father
- Beena Banerjee as Janki
- Shama Deshpande as Parvati Srivastav
- Raju Shrestha as Pinto
- Viju Khote
- Ishrat Ali as Prisoner Lambu Atta in Shrivastav's Jail
- Gurbachan Singh as Surajbhan's Henchman

== Production ==
During the filming, Inder Kumar was bedridden for five years due to a broken vertebra from helicopter fall while doing his own stunt on the set of the film.

== Soundtrack ==
Anand Raaj Anand composed the songs, while Dev Kohli wrote the songs.

#	Title	Singer(s)
1	"Aaya Maza Na Yaar"	Vinod Rathod
2	"Gal Suno Sardarji"	Anand Raj Anand, Kavita Krishnamurthy
3	"Jeena Teri Bahoon Mein"	Kavita Krishnamurthy
4	"Laila Laila"	Abhijeet, Alka Yagnik
5	"Masoom Si Ek Larkee"	Kumar Sanu
6	"Panga Na Le"	Shankar Mahadevan
7	"Subh Sawaray"	Kumar Sanu, Sadhana Sargam

== Reception ==
Bollywood Hungama wrote "The story of the film has nothing new to offer ? it's an amalgamation of several Hindi films released earlier. The story hardly moves in the initial portions, but does pick up with Sunil Shetty's introduction. But the expectations pale subsequently as Sunil's role lacks substance". The Hindu wrote "This is an assorted fare - a scene stolen from here, a scene from there but the sum of the parts does not add up to much. Honestly, this film defies logic, mocks at intelligence, and in the end, it is plainly ridiculous". Deccan Herald wrote "[..] the movie fails to entertain because of its repetitive theme. Equally faulty is its storyline that has only loopholes in it".
