= Jai Kaali =

Jai Kaali जय काली
- Theatrical release poster
- Directed by: Nikhil Saini
- Written by: Anwar Khan (dialogues); Nida Fazali; Yogesh (lyrics)
- Screenplay by: Nikhil Saini
- Story by: Nikhil Saini
- Produced by: Satram Rohra
- Starring: Jeetendra; Hema Malini
- Cinematography: Lawerance D'Souza
- Edited by: Subahsh Saigal
- Music by: Usha Khanna
- Production company: Bhagyalaxmi Chitra Mandir's
- Release date: 21 May 1992
- Running time: 126 minutes
- Country: India
- Language: Hindi

Jai Kaali is a 1992 Hindi-language Action, thriller snd Spiritual movie, produced by Satram Rohra on Bhagyalaxmi Chitra Mandir's banner and directed by Nikhil Saini. Starring Jeetendra, Hema Malini and music composed by Usha Khanna.

== Plot ==
The film begins in a remote forest area Girnar where the 4 vengeful Bankelal Chaurasia a contractor, collector Purushottam Desai, forest officer Ranjeet, and Mukkadam Samba are murdered by a woman Shikaali. At the tribunal, she declares non-guilty when Advocate Shiv Shankar appears as defense counsel. Then, she spins back, Shikaali a popular writer, reaches Girnar to do research on the lifestyles of the tribal inhabitants. Whereat, she spots the tribal inhabitants Adivasis are trampled by these 4 vengeful as bonded labor under the grab of honorable. During that process, befriends a tribal Divya who is molested and slain by the blackguards. Here, Shikali uproars when they seek to kill her and she jumps into a river. Shikaali claims that she is conscious therein. Thus, intense arguments proceed in the trial when Shiv Shankar breaks the fact with the witness of a temple priest that Shikaali has committed the crime in a state of hysteria as Kaali invoked in her body. Finally, the judiciary discharged the claims against Shikaali.

== Cast ==
- Jeetendra as Adovocate Shiv Shankar
- Hema Malini as Shikaali
- Saeed Jaffrey as Bankelal Chaurasia
- Sadashiv Amrapurkar as Mukkadam Samba
- Paresh Rawal as Purushottam Desai
- Ranjeet as Ranjeet
- Rajesh Vivek as Poojari Baba
- Vikas Anand
- Bharat Kapoor as Daljeet Singh
- Subbiraj as Judge
- Zarina Wahab as Divya
- Aruna Irani

== Soundtrack ==
Lyricist: Yogesh and Nida Fazli

#	Title	Singer(s)
1	"Zindagi Hai Ek Safar"	Usha Khanna
2	"Chude Baje"	Asha Bhosle, Usha Khanna
3	"Ghan Ghana Ghanan"	Gopi Krishna
4	"Chandi Mangala Kaali"	Vinod Rathod, Sapna Mukherjee, Aradhana
5	"Maa Hamare Ambika"	Suresh Wadkar
6	"Jaago Kaalika"	Suresh Wadkar
7	"Zindagi Hai Ek Safar"	Usha Khanna
8	"Zindagi Hai Ek Safar" (sad)	Nafis Anand
8	"Zindagi Tanha Safar"	Usha Khanna
