= Ashish R Mohan =

Indian film director and actor

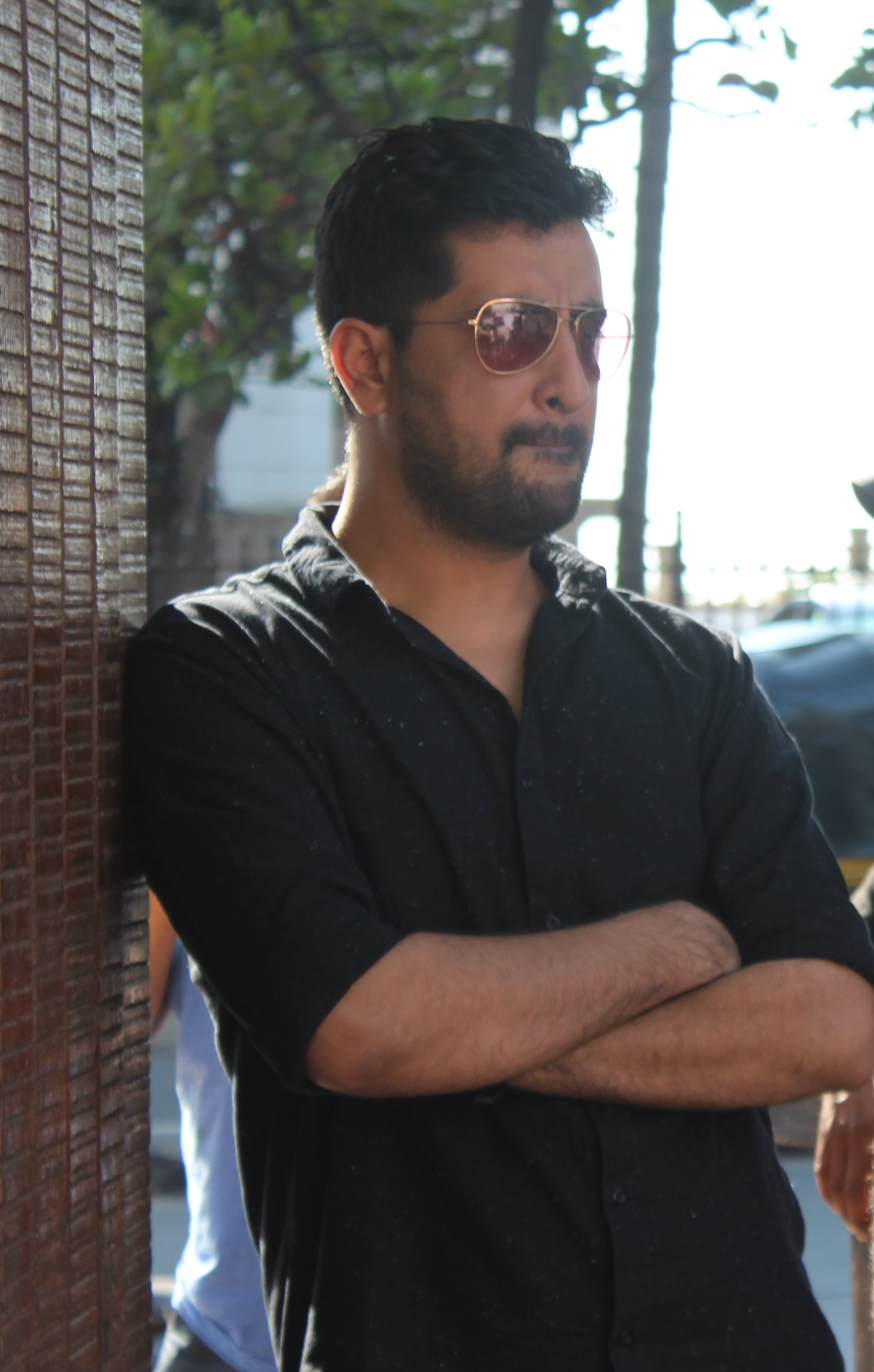
- Ashish R Mohan at 'Mr Beggar Billionaire' book Pre Launch on 27 January 2017
- Years active: 2003 – present
- Spouse: Komal Shahani (m. 2012)

Ashish R Mohan is an Indian film director and actor. His work as a director include Khiladi 786 and Welcome 2 Karachi.

He started his career as an assistant director with Anil Devgan on the film Blackmail starring Ajay Devgn.

During the making of Blackmail, he got in touch with Rohit Shetty and assisted him on his movies including the hits Golmaal, Golmaal Returns, All the Best: Fun Begins and Golmaal 3. Ashish made his directorial debut with Khiladi 786 which was one of the highest grossers of 2012. His second directorial venture Welcome 2 Karachi opened to an average response at the box office and got mixed reviews from the critics.

== Personal life ==
Mohan married costume designer Komal Shahani in February 2012.

== Filmography ==
Key
†	Denotes films that have not yet been released

=== As director ===
Year	Film	Cast	Notes
2012	Khiladi 786	Akshay Kumar, Asin, Himesh Reshamiya	
2015	Welcome 2 Karachi	Arshad Warsi, Jackky Bhagnani	
2026	Daadi Ki Shaadi	Neetu Singh, Kapil Sharma, Riddhima Kapoor Sahni	

=== As assistant director and chief assistant director ===
Year	Film	Cast	Genre
2005	Blackmail	Ajay Devgan, Suniel Shetty, Priyanka Chopra	Thriller
2006	Golmaal	Ajay Devgan, Tusshar Kapoor, Arshad Warsi, Sharman Joshi, Paresh Rawal, Rimi Sen	Comedy
2006	Waris Shah: Ishq Daa Waaris	Gurdas Mann, Juhi Chawla, Divya Dutta	Drama
2008	Sunday	Ajay Devgan, Ayesha Takia, Arshad Warsi, Irrfan Khan, Anjana Sukhani	Comedy, Thriller
2008	Golmaal Returns	Ajay Devgan, Kareena Kapoor, Arshad Warsi, Amrita Arora, Shreyas Talpade, Celina Jaitley, Tusshar Kapoor, Anjana Sukhani	Comedy
2009	All the Best: Fun Begins	Ajay Devgan, Sanjay Dutt, Fardeen Khan, Bipasha Basu, Mugdha Godse	Comedy
2010	Golmaal 3	Ajay Devgan, Tusshar Kapoor, Arshad Warsi, Shreyas Talpade, Kareena Kapoor, Kunal Khemu	Comedy
