= Khiladiyon Ka Khiladi =

1996 Indian film by Umesh Mehra

- Film poster
- Directed by: Umesh Mehra
- Written by: Umesh Mehra; Anand S. Vardhan
- Produced by: Keshu Ramsay
- Starring: Rekha; Akshay Kumar; Raveena Tandon; Brian Adams; Brian Lee; Inder Kumar; Gulshan Grover
- Cinematography: Peter Pereira
- Edited by: Kamal Saigal
- Music by: Songs: Anu Malik; Background Score: Raju Singh
- Production company: DMS Films
- Distributed by: Eros International
- Release date: 14 June 1996
- Running time: 192 minutes
- Country: India
- Language: Hindi
- Budget: ₹6.75 crore
- Box office: ₹25.15 crore

Khiladiyon Ka Khiladi (Hindi pronunciation: [kʰɪ.lɑː.ɽɪ.jõː kɑː kʰɪ.lɑː.ɽiː]; transl. Player of Players) is a 1996 Indian Hindi-language masala film starring Rekha, Akshay Kumar, Raveena Tandon and former WWF (now WWE) wrestlers Brian Adams as Crush and Brian Lee as The Undertaker. It was the 5th highest-grossing movie of the year 1996. It was the fourth installment in the Khiladi series. This was Rekha's second negative role after Madam X.

== Plot ==
The film is about a deadly game of survival in the ruthless world of crime and sleaze. A criminal don, Maya, hosts illegal wrestling matches in the India (Mumbai) and has the full support of the local police commissioner. Ajay Malhotra has relocated to the US and has started his own orchestra with the help of some of his friends.

His brother, Akshay, decides to visit him on hearing that he wants to marry his beloved in Hyderabad; on the airplane he meets Priya, and both fall in love. Once in the Bengaluru, Akshay finds out that the police have a warrant for the arrest of Ajay and want to question him. Akshay's attempts to locate Ajay land him with Maya, who happens to be Priya's sister. Apparently Maya is holding Ajay and will only release him after he hands over incriminating documents. Akshay soon wins Maya's confidence by rescuing her from attempts on her life made by King Don, and Maya begins to like him and trust him. Akshay then proposes to her, to which Maya agrees, much to the disappointment of Priya.

Soon Akshay kills Maya's men when they get to know of his true identity. He also organises a fake kidnap drama with Ajay's friends, who kidnap him and demand that Maya come to meet them with Ajay. By now Maya realizes that Akshay is Ajay's brother, and Priya actually loves Akshay. Maya calls the kidnappers and arranges a meeting the following night. News of this has spread to a hospitalised Ajay, who decides to intervene in the meeting. But is again captured by Maya's men. Maya then stages a shootout threatening Priya, Akshay and Ajay, but are interrupted by the cops and King Don. King Don is then defeated by everyone else present. At the end, Maya commits suicide, and before dying she hands over her sister Priya and Ajay to Akshay.

== Cast ==
- Rekha as Madam Maya
- Akshay Kumar as Akshay Kharodia Malhotra
- Raveena Tandon as Priya Malhotra
- Inder Kumar as Ajay Malhotra
- Barkha Madan as Jane
- Gulshan Grover as King Don
- Dolly Bindra as Bhagwanti
- Deven Verma as Akshay's Uncle
- Brian Adams as Crush (WWF character)
- Brian Lee as The Undertaker (WWF character)
- Anjana Mumtaz as Mrs. Malhotra
- Tiku Talsania as Priya's Uncle
- Kishore Bhanushali as Dev, Ajay's Friend
- Imran Khan as young akshay
- Gavin Packard as Gavin
- Dinesh Anand as Akshay's Adoptive Father

== Music ==
Khiladiyon Ka Khiladi

Soundtrack album by Anu Malik
- Released: March 1996
- Recorded: 1991–95
- Genre: Feature film soundtrack
- Label: Tips Industries

The film soundtrack contains 7 songs composed by Anu Malik.

No.	Title	Lyrics	Singer(s)	Length
1.	"Tu Kaun Hai Tera Naam Kya"	Indeevar	Kumar Sanu, Sadhana Sargam	7:21
2.	"Aaj Meri Zindagi"	Dev Kohli	Babul Supriyo, Alka Yagnik	8:00
3.	"In The Night No Control"	Dev Kohli	Sumitra Iyer	5:16
4.	"Itna Mujhe Pata Hai"	Dev Kohli	Kavita Krishnamurthy, Abhijeet	6:31
5.	"Maa Sherawaliye"	Traditional	Sonu Nigam, Attaullah Khan	7:07
6.	"Mera Baba Shahi Fakir (Deleted Song)"	Dev Kohli	Bali Brahmabhatt	8:03
7.	"Tu Waaqif Nahin Meri Deewangi Se"	Dev Kohli	Sadhana Sargam, Kumar Sanu	6:03

== Production ==
The movie has been shot in locations across India.

== Reception ==
K. N. Vijiyan of the New Straits Times wrote that "you get tired of all the songs and fighting in the second half" and added that it might be due to the story, "which becomes predictable and the long dialogues are a put-off".

== Home media ==
The DVD of the movie was released by Eros International. The television premiere of the movie was occurred on Star Plus in 1997. The film has been made streaming available on Zee5 since 2022 .

== Awards ==
Category	Winners and nominees	Result
Star Screen Award for Best Villain	Rekha	Won
Filmfare Award for Best Supporting Actress	Rekha	Won
Filmfare Award for Best Action	Akbar Bakshi	Won
