= Umesh Mehra =

Indian film director

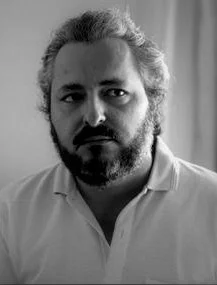
- Occupations: Director, screenwriter
- Years active: 1978–2003

Umesh Mehra is an Indian film director and producer known for his works in Hindi and Bengali cinema. He was prominent in the 1980s and 1990s. His notable films include Alibaba Aur 40 Chor (1980), Sohni Mahiwal (1984) and Vardi (1989). He directed Akshay Kumar in three films in the Khiladi series: Sabse Bada Khiladi (1995) Khiladiyon Ka Khiladi (1996) and International Khiladi (1999). He directed many Mithun Chakraborty starrers like Ashanti (1982), Mujrim (1989), Guru (1989) and Yaar Gaddar (1994). In 1998 he directed the veteran actor Dilip Kumar in Qila which was Kumar's last film. Mehra's last film as director was 2002's Yeh Mohabbat Hai.

He is the son of Bollywood producer F.C. Mehra.

== Selected filmography ==
- Yeh Mohabbat Hai (2002)
- Asoka (2001) (actor as Chandragupta Maurya)
- International Khiladi (1999)
- Qila (1998)
- Khiladiyon Ka Khiladi (1996)
- Sabse Bada Khiladi (1995)
- Yaar Gaddar (1994)
- Aashiq Awara (1993)
- Shikari (1991)
- Mujrim (1989)
- Guru (1989)
- Vardi (1989)
- Kasam (1988)
- Jaal (1986)
- Avinash (1986)
- Teri Baahon Mein (1984)
- Sohni Mahiwal (1984)
- Ashanti (1982)
- Alibaba Aur 40 Chor (1980)
- Hamare Tumhare (1979)
