= Mauka Mauka =

Indian television advertising campaign

Mauka Mauka is a 2015 Indian television advertisement campaign created by Star Sports India to promote its TV broadcast of the 2015 Cricket World Cup. Although initially planned as a standalone advert for the India–Pakistan group stage match, following the overwhelming positive response for the first video, the channel made a series of adverts for each of India's matches at the 2015 World Cup.

== Sequence ==
=== India–Pakistan advert ===
Mauka Mauka begins in March 1992 with a young Pakistani cricket supporter in Karachi saving up firecrackers to burst when Pakistan is about to beat India at the World Cup. He is disappointed as his team loses the match and at being unable to light the firecrackers. The video shows him grow older over the years, still saving up the firecrackers and waiting for his mauka (chance) to burst them, while his team fails to defeat India in any of the subsequent World Cups. The video ends at the conclusion of the 2011 World Cup semi-final with the supporter, who is now married and has a child, asking his son in anguish, "Kab phodenge yaar?" (When will we burst the crackers, buddy?). The advert is a reference to Pakistan losing to India in all five meetings at the World Cup prior to 2015.

=== Subsequent adverts ===
Following India's win over Pakistan, two South African fans come to a Pakistani fan's house, gift him firecrackers and sing "Mauka Mauka", reminding him of India's failure to defeat South Africa at the World Cup. In the next advert, the Pakistani supporter is seen wearing a South African jersey and watching the India–South Africa match with the two South African supporters. He removes and throws the jersey in frustration after India wins the match, before an Emirati supporter shows up at his doorstep and gives him a UAE jersey. In the following sequence, the 2 South African Supporters and the Pakistani supporter, now in UAE jersey and with Emirati supporter, watches India beat UAE. He then receives home delivery of a West Indies jersey, soon after which an Indian supporter rings his doorbell and tells him that he will be unable to burst the firecrackers and asks him to play Holi instead on India–West Indies match day (as the festival fell on the same day).

The Pakistani supporter is then seen roaming around the streets of Mumbai in an Indian jersey, carrying his box of firecrackers and walking into Star Sports' office, much to the surprise of cricket analyst Harsha Bhogle. Aakash Chopra then reminds Bhogle in front of Pakistani fan that Pakistan will get a chance (referred to as Mauka, to tease the Pakistani fan) to enter the quarter-finals if India beat Ireland in their next match. The supporter switches back to his Pakistan jersey after his team wins its next match. He then hears Chopra saying that Pakistan are not yet through to the knockout stage as a big defeat in their last group game to Ireland could see them exit the World Cup.

Ahead of the Bangladesh–India quarter-final match, an advert featuring a group of Indian supporters in a jugalbandi against a team supporters of rest of the teams, including the Pakistani supporter, was released, having a "World vs India" theme. The advertisement campaign ended with India's defeat to Australia in the semi-final, with an advert featuring Salman Khan promoting the second season of the Pro Kabaddi League being aired during the match. However there was a final ad that was shot. The advert never released as India failed to make it to the finals but it was leaked on the internet. In the unreleased advertisement Indian supporters are seen composing the Mauka Mauka tune and the advert ends with Ranbir Kapoor saying "Yeh hai Aahkiri Mauka" (This is the last chance).

== Production ==
The advert for the India-Pakistan match was made by a crew of ten people and completed in five days. The production crew consisted of members of Bubblewrap Films, an ad film production house in Mumbai, as well as two freelance music directors Vinayak Salvi and Rohan Utpat who were on-boarded two days before the shoot. Salvi said, "According to the brief, we gave it a Pakistani flavour, making it like a contemporary qawwali." According to Utpat, they did not use subcontinent cricket terms like chauka (boundary) to make it "a more universal emotion." The director of Bubblewrap Films, Suresh Triveni said, "We wanted a song that would make sense even without the video. So no cricketing terms were used. The song has strains of Sufi and qawwali in a Coke Studio style and the lyrics give the idea of a wanderer in search of the almighty." The Star Sports' creative team - Juju Basu, Mustafa Rangwala, Prathamesh Sapte, Ajeet Mestry and Rohit Khanna from marketing came up with the "Mauka" idea and subsequent scripts while the lyrics for the jingle was penned by Vikas Dubey (also from Star Sports).

Triveni picked Vishal Malhotra to play the character of the Pakistani supporter. The music composers approached Chandigarh-based singer Alamgir Khan to record the jingle for the advert. Khan, who had previously collaborated on the soundtracks of Bollywood films such as Bodyguard and Shaadi Ke Side Effects, revealed that he was reluctant to sing the jingle for the advert and that the producers had to convince him hard. The song was composed and sung in a day, and the agency completed the shoot of the advert within five days, after which post-production was carried out.

== Reception ==
The advert for the India–Pakistan match received positive reviews in India, but Pakistanis "ran afoul and used every possible media front to oppose the campaign." The Express Tribune wrote that the campaign "had successfully ignited a ‘healthy’ sporting rivalry in the most subtle way as possible." Regarding the positive response for the jingle, Khan said in a TV show, "I never thought this would become such a popular jingle. It is on everybody’s lips these days. I have been told that the Indian team in Australia has also liked it very much."

After the first advert went viral on social media with over 12 million online views, the team at Star Sports decided to turn it into a campaign by scripting adverts for all of India's subsequent matches in a storyline format. The production house shot two versions for each match–one for India winning the previous match and one for India losing it–and released the appropriate version as soon as the previous match concluded. Many spoof and response videos from creators like TVF and V Seven Pictures emerged across social media platforms and YouTube, during and after the World Cup.

The day after India's defeat to Australia in the semi-final, there were reports of a large number of Pakistani and Bangladeshi fans calling up BCCI's headquarters and mockingly singing "Mauka mauka! Kya hua mauke ka?" (What happened to the opportunity?), forcing BCCI to disconnect the lines. Pakistani cricketer Shahid Afridi also sang the jingle on a TV show after India's World Cup exit.

The whole ad campaign garnered more than 30 million views across the world. Forbes Magazine listed it amongst the 5 Best Sports Marketing Campaigns That Went Viral In 2015.

In 2017, following Pakistan's victory over India in the Champions Trophy final, Sarfraz Ahmed sang Mauka Mauka during victory celebrations outside his home in Karachi. An advert called No issue, lelo tissue, seen as a response to Mauka Mauka, was reportedly aired across several Pakistani TV channels after the match.

== See also ==
- India–Pakistan cricket rivalry
