= Sudhir Dalvi =

Indian actor

- Born: 20 March 1939 (age 87)
- Occupation: Actor
- Years active: 1974–2006

Sudhir Dalvi is an Indian actor. He first came to prominence for portraying Guru Vashishta in Ramanand Sagar's TV series Ramayan and is well known for his role as Sai Baba. He also acted as Sai Baba in Manoj Kumar's feature film Shirdi Ke Sai Baba which is a milestone role in Bollywood. He also became famous for his role in TV series Kyunki Saas Bhi Kabhi Bahu Thi.

He played Nana Nagarkar in a famous tele show of the 1990s, Junoon.

He also appeared in Shyam Benegal's TV Series Bharat Ek Khoj as elderly Shah Jahan in the Aurangzeb episodes.

== Filmography ==
List of film credits
Year	Title	Role	Notes
1974	27 Down		
1977	Shirdi Ke Sai Baba	Saibaba	Main leading role
1977	Apnapan	Beggar In the Song "Aadmi Musafir Hain"	
1978	Karmayogi	judge	
1979	Ladke Baap Se Badke	Daaku	
1980	Saboot	Defence Council	
1980	Aasha	Poojari	
1980	Aap Ke Deewane		
1980	Lootmaar	Pandit	
1981	Kranti	Bhima, Sureeli Father	
1981	Gehrayee	Pujari	
1982	Pyaar Ke Rahi	Girdhari Seth	
1983	Arpan	Sona's Baba	
1983	Souten	lawyer, public prosecutor	
1983	Qayamat (1983 film)	Raghu	
1983	Pukar	Dinanath	
1984	Maati Maangey Khoon	Poojari/Pandit	
1984	Hum Hain Lajawaab	Jyoti's dad	
1985	Karm Yudh	police inspector/IGP Bali	
1986	Sasti Dulhan Mahenga Dulha	Khan Bahadur Abdul Rahim	
1986	Manav Hatya	Minister Baakelal	Main Negative Role
1986	Kala Dhanda Goray Log	police inspector	
1986	Avinash	Dr Anand	
1987	Dadagiri	S.P Saxena, estate property lawyer	
1987	Hukumat	Sonia Dad	
1987	Imaandaar	Dr. Raj Bahadur Saxena	
1987	Satyamev Jayate	Mr Mishra	
1987	Hawalaat	Truck Driver Kailash	
1987	Marte Dam Tak	P.C Mathur	
1987	Khudgarz	Deshmukh	
1987	Watan Ke Rakhwale	Raja Pratap	
1988	Aakhri Nishchay	Manoha r	
1988	Tamacha	Mohan	
1988	Kasam	Inspector General	
1988	Agnee	Pandit	
1989	Vardi	Inspector General	
1989	Suryaa: An Awakening	senior army officer of Suraj	
1989	Guru	police commissioner	
1989	Kahan Hai Kanoon	Jyoti's Dad	
1989	Na Insaafi	Sadhu in the ashram	
1989	Billoo Badshah	Shankar lal	
1989	Daana Paani (1989 film)	judge	
1989	Apna Desh Paraye Log	journalist Sunita Dad	
1989	Toofan	Dr Sharma/Gopal's Father	
1990	Haar Jeet		
1990	Azaad Desh Ke Gulam	Father Francis	
1991	Paap Ki Aandhi	Jailor Gupta	
1991	Iraada	Gomes	
1991	Dancer	Beggar singing with harmonium	
1991	Rupaye Dus Karod	Chamanlal Verma	
1991	Anpekshit	Inspector Tarde	
1992	Vajraghat		
1992	Sanam Aap Ki Khatir		
1992	Zulm Ki Hukumat	police commissioner	
1993	Tirangaa	Prof Nasrul Hasan nuclear scientist	
1993	Andha Intaquam		
1993	Waqt Hamara Hai	Netaji Ramgopal Verma	
1993	Khal Nayak	Shambhu Master, village school teacher	
1994	Kanoon	public prosecutor	
1994	Ekka Raja Rani	police constable /Asha's Father	
1995	Takkar	Police Commissioner	
1995	Sarhad: The Border of Crime	DIG Saxena	
1995	The Gambler	Mr Pandey Dayashankar Pandey father	
1996	English Babu Desi Mem	doctor	
1999	Aakhri Raat		
2000	Aaghaaz	School Master/Pushpa father	
2003	Xcuse Me	Kelkar	

=== Television ===
List of television credits
Year	Show	Role	Channel	Notes
1986‍–‍1987	Buniyaad	Guruji at Pragyavati Uttarkashi Ashram	DD National	
1987‍–‍1988	Ramayan	Vasishtha	DD National	
1988	Bharat Ek Khoj	Shahjahan	DD National	Episodes 35,36 Aurangzeb
1988	Mirza Ghalib	Bahadur Shah Zafar	DD National	
1991‍–‍1992	Chanakya	Ambhiraj	DD National	
1992	Talaash	Master Dinanath	DD National	Episodes 7,8
1993‍–‍1998	Junoon	Nana Nagarkar		
1993‍–‍2001	Zee Horror Show	1995 Khamoshi 6 Episodes/1999 Khauff 5 Episodes	Zee Tv	
1997‍–‍2001	Jai Hanuman	Maharishi Valmiki	DD National	Mega Tv Serial Produced & Directed By Sanjay Khan
2000	Vishnu Puran	Brahma	DD National	It was aired on DD National and Zee Tv Also
2000‍–‍2001	Babul Ki Duwayen Leti Jaa	Preeti Maternal Uncle	Zee Tv	
2000‍–‍2002; 2008	Kyunki Saas Bhi Kabhi Bahu Thi	Govardhan Virani / Bapuji	Star Plus	He was Replaced in place of Dinesh Thakur
2006	Woh Huye Na Hamare	Mr. Damania	DD National	
