= Khiladi 420 =

2000 Indian film by Neeraj Vora

- Eros Disc Cover
- Directed by: Neeraj Vora
- Written by: Uttam Gada
- Produced by: Keshu Ramsay
- Starring: Akshay Kumar; Mahima Chaudhry
- Cinematography: Prabhu; Pappu
- Edited by: Mohammed Ashfaque
- Music by: Songs: Sanjeev–Darshan; Background Score: Sanjoy Chowdhury
- Production company: DMS Films
- Distributed by: Eros International; B4U Entertainment
- Release date: 29 December 2000
- Running time: 168 minutes
- Country: India
- Language: Hindi
- Budget: ₹80 million
- Box office: ₹102 million

Khiladi 420 (English: Player 420) is a 2000 Indian Hindi-language action thriller film directed by Neeraj Vora and starring Akshay Kumar and Mahima Chaudhry. The film was written by Uttam Gada and released on 29 December 2000. It is the seventh installment in the Khiladi series starring Kumar.

== Plot ==
Shyam Prasad Bhardwaj is a multi-millionaire industrialist, and his business is spread worldwide. He has a daughter, Ritu, who is of marriageable age. He hires Dev Kumar Malhotra to work for him, and is impressed with the way Dev handles himself. Shyam would like Ritu and Dev to get married. But days after the engagement, Shyam finds that Dev is a con man after his money, since he has taken debt from a criminal.

Dev kills Shyam to bury the secret, but Ritu's niece Riya sees this. The girl goes in a deep shock and since Dev is constantly watching her, the secret cannot come out. Dev plans to kill her as well, but Ritu gets an inkling of the truth somehow. Dev tries to kill Ritu on the night of their honeymoon, but Ritu manages to kill him.

A scared Ritu goes to her grandmother, who informs her Dev is hurt but is alive in hospital. She visits the hospital and gets the shock of her life to see Dev alive and without a scratch on his body. Dev behaves as if nothing happened. Everyone in the home believes him to be Dev. Finally, when they are left alone, he reveals his true identity to Ritu. He calms her down and tells her that he is indeed Dev's identical twin brother, Anand Kumar Malthora.

Anand explains that Dev had crooked ways, something which Anand disliked. The brothers got separated. Dev met Anand just a week ago to tell him that he has mended his ways and is going to get married. Dev came there to meet Ritu. Dev had given all the information about Ritu and her family to Anand. That night, Anand came to meet Dev just after Ritu had killed him. Anand saw all the mess and realized that something had gone wrong.

But when he saw his ID, he realized that Dev was posing as Anand here. and Dev was probably dead, for which he is grateful to Ritu as Dev might have had a plan to kill Anand along with her. Ritu & Anand kept this a secret. However, Inspector Rahul, an old friend of Ritu, became suspicious. Besides, Dev's girlfriend, whom Anand does not recognize, thinks that Dev has dumped her. Dev's another enemy is a criminal named Bhai, who is also a rival of his money lender.

Ritu slowly starts falling for Anand, but Anand doesn't reciprocate her feelings. Anand has to live a double life in front of the bad guys, he is Anand, while in front of Ritu's family, he is Dev. Rahul becomes suspicious that Ritu and Dev conspired to kill Shyam. To save Ritu, Anand takes the blame on his shoulders.

Meanwhile, when both the criminals try to get even with Anand, Rahul realizes that he has not seen a clear picture. Anand tells him the true story, which he reluctantly believes. As he cannot see an innocent man die, Rahul proposes that Anand can live only if only Dev's dead body is found.

Anand escapes from the custody as per Rahul's plans and retrieves his brother's body from the place where Dev's girlfriend hid it. He wants the people to believe that Dev died in an accident after the escape while he is the good person. Dev's rivals unite and try to kill Anand. Anand succeeds in killing the villains. When Dev's body is found, the court closes the case. Anand is exonerated and reunited with Ritu.

== Cast ==
- Akshay Kumar in a dual role as:
  - Dev Kumar Malhotra; Anand's elder twin brother; Ritu's first husband (Negative role)
  - Anand Kumar Malhotra Dev's younger twin brother; Ritu's second husband
- Mahima Chaudhry as Ritu Malhotra; Anand 's wife; Dev's widow
- Antara Mali as Monica D'Souza
- Gulshan Grover as Bhai Virendra (gangster)
- Alok Nath as Shyam Prasad Bhardwaj
- Sudhanshu Pandey as Inspector Rahul
- Mukesh Rishi as Bhai Gaurav Bakshi (gangster)
- Shayaji Shinde as Bhai Baburao (gangster)
- Dilip Joshi as Arora
- Razak Khan as Gawas
- Viju Khote as Nadkarni
- Nayantara as Ritu's grandmother

== Stunts ==
Akshay Kumar performed some of his most dangerous stunts during a scene in the film. During one scene, in Kumar's own words: "I had to catch this running plane and climb it. People are scared of sitting inside a plane, and like a stupid man I am standing on top of a plane. And then I’m supposed to jump from that plane, after it is a thousand feet up in the air, onto a hot air balloon. I did it in one shot." Jackie Chan performed a similar hot air balloon stunt in Armour of God (1986).

Towards the end of the film, which involves car chases and fight scenes, Kumar performs various other stunts. During the finale, he is seen being chased by a car, dodging bullets, jumping off buildings, and climbing walls.

== Soundtracks ==
The music of Khiladi 420 is composed by Sanjeev–Darshan and Sameer penned the lyrics.

Title	Singer(s)
"Batiyan Bujado"	Sonu Nigam
"Dheere Dheere Sanam"	Udit Narayan, Mahalakshmi Iyer
"Dil Le Le Dil De De"	Abhijeet, Alka Yagnik
"Ganga Nahale"	Silk Route
"Jagte Hain Hum"	Sonu Nigam, Kavita Krishnamurthy
"Kaisa Yeh Pyar Hai"	Kumar Sanu, Kavita Krishnamurthy
"Meri Biwi Ka Jawab Nahin"	Sonu Nigam

== Reception ==
=== Box office ===
At the box office, the film grossed ₹10.2 crore ($2,269,860), equivalent to ₹1,046,144,717 ($9,420,294) adjusted for inflation as of 2018.

=== Critical response ===
Upon release, the film received mixed reviews. In his review, Taran Adarsh wrote that "The actor does a great job in a role that has negative shades, but as a softie in the second half, he is just about okay. And that's mainly because he has been asked to do what he has been doing in film after film. Nevertheless, Khiladi 420 is amongst his finest performances." Sukanya Verma wrote, "Negative roles and Akshay Kumar don't go hand-in-hand. [...] Akshay is ridiculously over the top and irritating to the core. However, he manages a decent performance as the sober and suave Anand."

Retrospectively, the film has received acclaim for its action scenes and stunt sequences. The hot air balloon stunt, in particular, is considered Kumar's most dangerous stunt, and has been compared to Jackie Chan, who had also performed a stunt involving a hot air balloon in Armour of God (1986).
