= Welcome 2 Karachi =

- Theatrical Release Poster
- Directed by: Ashish R Mohan
- Written by: Vrajesh Hirjee
- Screenplay by: Kushal Bakshi; Ashish R Mohan
- Produced by: Vashu Bhagnani
- Starring: Arshad Warsi; Jackky Bhagnani; Lauren Gottlieb; Adnan Shah Tipu; Ali Hyder
- Cinematography: Mark Nutkins
- Edited by: Steven H Bernard
- Music by: Songs: Rochak Kohli; Jeet Gannguli; Amjad Nadeem; Background Score: Rochak Kohli
- Production company: Pooja Entertainment
- Distributed by: AA Films
- Release date: 28 May 2015
- Running time: 131 minutes
- Country: India
- Language: Hindi

Welcome 2 Karachi is a 2015 Indian Hindi-language black comedy film directed by Ashish R Mohan and produced by Vashu Bhagnani. The film stars Arshad Warsi and Jackky Bhagnani as pivotal leads. Music directors Jeet Ganguly and Rochak Kohli composed music for this film. The film was released on 28 May 2015.

== Plot ==
The story kicks off with two dumb and dumber friends, Captain Shammi Thakur, a courtmartialed navy officer and Kedar Patel, a Gujarati who has been denied a U.S. visa multiple times. Both plan to sail to the United States using a boat but, with a twist of fate, end up on the beach of Karachi, Pakistan. On realizing the truth they both try to escape, while being chased by an ISI Agent. Both get kidnapped by a local don Azher Baluch, who demands ransom from Kedar's father and later releases them in a pathan colony to collect fake passports. But Shami, messes up with a bunch of pathans over an India-Pakistan match. In the struggle to escape from pathans both meet a Talibani militant, who takes them to a Taliban camp where they are misunderstood as Talibani militants.

A few days later, Shami and Kedar plans to escape the camp by stealing camp leader's mobile phone, which was actually a detonator of a bomb designed by Taliban to attack NATO army. In attempt to dial a number Shami unknowingly triggers the bomb destroying the Talibani camp itself. Attracted by the explosions, a drone arrives and the two are arrested by American Army. After knowing their situation both are released. They go to Azher Baluch, the only person they know in Pakistan. Baluch makes a deal with ruling minister that in return for an election ticket he will hand over the two guys to him. The minister wants to take the credit of attack on Taliban by announcing both Shami and Kedar as Pakistani soldiers.

Soon the two are declared as national heroes by Pakistani media while the Indian media claims them as Indians stuck in Pakistan. Caught in this tug of war Shami and Kedar are once again kidnapped by American army, who promises to deport them to India if they could give the credit of Talibani camp attack to American Army in media. They agree and are sent to Karachi Airport to finally catch a flight back to India. While waiting for their flight, Shami notices a Talibani militant disguised as an airlines pilot. Seeing a possibility of a terror attack they both decide to rescue, being backed by Pakistani army. During crossfire Shami and Kedar manage to overpower the militant and take off with the plane, finally able to depart from Pakistan. The movie ends with both sitting in the cockpit only to find a strange voice behind them (possibly another militant) suggesting them to take a left turn.

== Cast ==
- Arshad Warsi as Captain Shammi Thakur
- Jackky Bhagnani as Kedar Patel
- Lauren Gottlieb as ISI Agent Shazia Ansari, also as lead belly dancer in the song "Shakira"
  - Priya Raina as the voice of ISI Agent Shazia Ansari
- Imran Hasnee as ISI Agent
- Kubra Khan as ISI agent Asma
- Ayub Khosa as Taliban leader Agha Jaan
- Adnan Shah Tipu as Azhar Baloch
- Dalip Tahil as Mitesh Patel, Kedar's father
- Raj Das as Raja
- Pavan Malhotra as Pathan
- Kumud Pant as Gang Member
- Ali Hyder Junejo as J

== Production ==
The film has been shot in various parts of the United Kingdom including Bradford, Birmingham and Wales and sets were recreated to resemble Karachi. During the shooting of scenes in Wales, the lead actors were mistaken as real Taliban people and the shoot was halted by Scotland Yard authorities. The Bradford Bazaar was used as the backdrop of the film's shooting in Bradford. During the shoot, the airport set from Birmingham was stolen by truckloaders. During this, Bhagnani suffered a loss due to which shooting came to a halt.

== Casting ==
The role of Jackky Bhagnani was first offered to Irrfan Khan but due to other commitments Khan left the film.

Kubra Khan was originally cast as the female lead and shot most of the film before creative differences led to her leaving the film and being replaced by Lauren Gottlieb, who reshot most of her scenes. Certain scenes featuring Kubra were retained in the final version of the film and the script was re-written to change her role into a much smaller one.

== Soundtrack ==
Welcome 2 Karachi

Soundtrack album
- Released: 29 April 2015
- Genre: Feature film soundtrack
- Label: T-Series

The music for the film is composed by Jeet Gannguli, Rochak Kohli and Amjad-Nadeem. The soundtrack of the film comprises 5 songs. The full audio album of the film was released on 29 April 2015 on YouTube.

No.	Title	Lyrics	Music	Singer(s)	Length
1.	"Lalla Lalla Lori"	Rochak Kohli	Rochak Kohli	Vishal Dadlani, Shivangi R. Kashyap	04:18
2.	"Boat Ma Kukdookoo"	Rochak Kohli	Rochak Kohli	Mika Singh, Rochak Kohli, Deane Sequeira, Shivangi R. Kashyap	03:20
3.	"Shakira"	Kausar Munir	Jeet Gannguli	Shalmali Kholgade	03:37
4.	"Chal Bhaag"	Sameer Anjaan	Amjad Nadeem	Love Juneja, Wajid Ali	04:33
5.	"Mera Yaar Fantastic"	Sameer Anjaan	Rochak Kohli	Alamgir Khan	03:59

== Critical reception ==
The film received largely negative reviews from critics. Paloma Sharma of Rediff rated it 0.5 stars and said, "Welcome 2 Karachi is a sad excuse for screen space"

== Box office ==
Welcome to Karachi grossed ₹1.5 Cr in India on its opening day. The comedy drama film only managed to gross Rs. 5.50 crore net (55 million) approx. on its first weekend at the box office, including paid previews. This isn't shocking as the film pulled poor numbers on its first day by grossing Rs. 1.35 crore net (13.5 million)approx. on Friday. The film however saw a decent growth on Sunday than it saw on its first day by doing a business of Rs. 2 crore net (20 million) approx. at the box office.
