= Khiladi 786 =

2012 Indian film by Ashish R Mohan

- Promotional poster
- Directed by: Ashish R Mohan
- Screenplay by: Kushal Ved Bakshi
- Dialogues by: Bunty Rathore
- Story by: Himesh Reshammiya
- Produced by: Twinkle Khanna; Himesh Reshammiya; Sunil Lulla
- Starring: Mithun Chakraborty; Akshay Kumar; Raj Babbar; Asin; Himesh Reshammiya; Mukesh Rishi; Gurpreet Ghuggi
- Narrated by: Paresh Rawal
- Cinematography: Attar Singh Saini
- Edited by: Ashish Arjun Gaikar
- Music by: Himesh Reshammiya
- Production companies: HR Musik; Hari Om Entertainment
- Distributed by: Eros International
- Release date: 7 December 2012
- Running time: 141 minutes
- Country: India
- Language: Hindi
- Budget: ₹63 crore
- Box office: ₹107 crore

Khiladi 786 is a 2012 Indian Hindi-language action comedy film directed by Ashish R Mohan. The film stars Mithun Chakraborty, Akshay Kumar, Raj Babbar, Asin (in her penultimate Hindi film appearance), Himesh Reshammiya, and Mukesh Rishi. It is the eighth and final installment in the Khiladi film series.

== Plot ==
Champaklal Desai is a successful matchmaker and wedding organizer in Mumbai whose business starts going downhill when his son Mansukh joins him. After destroying many weddings unintentionally, Mansukh is thrown out of the house by Champak. A depressed Mansukh pays a visit to his friend Jeevanlal Praanlal D'Costa, who advises him to stop drinking, but Mansukh doesn't listen. Jeevanlal snatches the bottle, but in the process, the bottle crashes into the windshield of a car, due to which the car crashes into a tree and stops.

The car was being driven by Indu, who intentionally scares her grooms away by taking them for a dangerous long drive—the same trick she was using when her car crashed into the tree. Indu turns out to be the sister of an underworld don TTT, i.e., Tatya Tukaram Tendulkar, who wants to get her married to a decent family. TT's goons abduct Mansukh and Jeevanlal due to the incident. On learning that Mansukh is a matchmaker, TT assigns him the task of finding a good groom for Indu in return for letting Mansukh live. Jeevanlal is sure that they're going to die, but Mansukh claims that he knows a perfect groom for her.

This groom is none other than Bahattar Singh (Akshay Kumar), a police officer from a small village in Punjab who never lets goons get away. His family consists of his father Sattar Singh and Ikhattar Singh and their wives [Sattar, Ikhattar, Bhattar, and Chauhattar mean 70, 71, 72, and 74]. It is mentioned that Bahattar's brother Tehattar (73) was lost as a child. Even Bahattar has had tough luck finding a bride. But there's one thing Mansukh doesn't know: Bahattar and his family just pretend to be cops and wear fake uniforms. When Mansukh comes to their doorstep with an alliance for Bahattar, he lies to them by saying that TT is the assistant commissioner of police, due to which Bahattar and his family are forced to carry on their police act.

On reaching Mumbai, two families in the same house pretend that they are from the police. After Bahattar is constantly trying to woo Indu, but she's having none of it since she already has a boyfriend named Azad Reddy. Azad is in jail, and whenever he is released, he performs some stupid act, due to which he is put back in jail. On learning about Azad, Bahattar helps Indu break him out of jail. Due to this act, Indu realises that Bahattar is a nice person and develops an affection for him. After reuniting Azad and Indu, Indu and Bahattar are saying goodbye to one another when they learn that the other's family are not cops. Azad interferes and talks rudely to Indu and enraging tries to slap her, but is stopped, slapped, and pushed away by Bahattar. Indu now realizes that actually she is in love with Bahattar and Bahattar is the person whom she will marry. She holds Bahattar's hand and walks home.

Now Indu and Bahattar tell Mansukh, who has by now already learned the truth about the families, to continue the act and not let each family know the truth about the other. But sadly, on the wedding day, they learn the truth. Immediately, Azad and his goons abduct Indu. Angered, Bahattar and TT fight them and rescue Indu. TT realizes that Bahattar is the perfect man for her and blesses their alliance. To top the happiness, Tehattar Singh (Akshay Kumar) arrives, who is now a real police officer in Mumbai, where it ends up with them reunited with his brother Bahattar, and the family gets reunited together, and Bahattar and Indu get married.

== Cast ==
- Akshay Kumar in a dual role as
  - Bahattar Singh (72), fake Sub Inspector in Punjab Police, Sattar and Olivia's elder son, Ikhattar's elder nephew, Chouhattar's cousin, Margaret's elder grandson
  - Tehattar Singh (73), Bahattar's brother, Assistant Commissioner of Maharashtra Police (A.C.P), Sattar and Olivia's younger son, Ikhattar's younger nephew, Chouhattar's cousin, Margaret's younger grandson
- Asin as Indu Tendulkar, Tatya's sister, Bahattar Singh's love interest and Azad Reddy's former girlfriend
- Mithun Chakraborty as Tatya Tukaram Tendulkar (TTT), Indu's brother, Mumbai's Underworld Don
- Raj Babbar as Sattar Singh (70), Bahattar and Tehattar's father, Olivia's husband, Chouhattar's uncle, Ikhattar's brother, Margaret's elder son
- Himesh Reshammiya as Mansukh Desai, Champaklal and Jigna's son
- Mukesh Rishi as Ikhatar Singh (71), Sattar's younger brother, Shing's husband, Chouhattar's father and Bahattar and Tehattar's uncle, Margaret's younger son
- Gurpreet Ghuggi as Sukhi
- Manoj Joshi as Champaklal Desai, Jigna's husband, Mansukh's father
- Rahul Singh as Azad Reddy, criminal and inmate at Central Jail
- Sanjay Mishra as Jeevanlal Praanlal D. Costa, Mansukh's friend
- Johnny Lever as Maharashtra Police Inspector Bhalerao Kambli
- Rajesh Khattar as Punjab Police Assistant Sub-Inspector Jugnu Singh
- Mukesh Tiwari as Jailor from Maharashtra Police
- Sejal Shah as Jigna, Champaklal's wife, Mansukh's mother
- Bharti Singh as Milli, Bhagat's sister
- Navin Prabhakar as Raj, Indu's husband-to-be whom she scares away
- Mushtaq Khan as Bhagat, Milli's brother
- Cyndy Khojol as Shing Wang Kaur, Ikhattar's wife, Chouhattar's mother, Bahattar and Tehattar's aunt
- Claudia Ciesla as a special appearance in the song "Balma"

== Production ==
In March 2012, it was announced that Ashish R Mohan and Himesh Reshammiya would be creating an action-comedy film starring Akshay Kumar with the title Punjab Rajnikanth. In April the title was changed as Khiladi 786, the return to the Khiladi series after 12 years.

=== Casting ===
Reshammiya reported casting issues therefore the film was delayed. In April 2012 Amitabh Bachchan and Salman Khan was signed to play a main role. He soon dropped out and was replaced by Mithun Chakraborty. Claudia Ciesla was roped into a special appearance to do an item number.

Many rumours went out about the female leads. The choices included Ileana D'Cruz, Nargis Fakhri and Diana Penty. However, in June 2012, Asin was signed.

=== Filming ===
The filming began on 2 June 2012, for a 20-day schedule in Kamalistan Studios. The action sequences were provided by Jal Singh Nijjar and Peshal Oli

== Soundtrack ==
The soundtrack was composed by Himesh Reshammiya and the music was sold to T-Series. Lyrics were penned by Sameer, R Mehndi, Shabbir Ahmed and Reshammiya. Punjabi rapper Yo Yo Honey Singh recorded the song "Lonely" for the film. The song "Hookah Bar" interpolates "Turn Up the Music" by Chris Brown while "Balma"'s intro adapts LMFAO's "Sexy and I Know It".

Khiladi 786

Soundtrack album by Himesh Reshammiya
- Released: 30 October 2012
- Recorded: 2012
- Venue: Mumbai
- Genre: Film soundtrack
- Label: T-Series
- Producer: Himesh Reshammiya

Himesh Reshammiya chronology
| Son of Sardaar (2012) | Khiladi 786 (2012) | Special Chabbis (2013) |

| No. | Title | Lyrics | Singer(s) | Length |
|---|---|---|---|---|
| 1. | "Lonely" | Shabbir Ahamed , Yo Yo Honey Singh | Himesh Reshammiya, Hamsika Iyer, Yo Yo Honey Singh |
| 2. | "Balma" | Sameer | Sreerama Chandra Mynampati and Shreya Ghoshal |
| 3. | "Long Drive" | Sameer | Mika Singh |
| 4. | "Sari Sari Raat" | Shabbir Ahamed | Himesh Reshammiya |
| 5. | "Hookah Bar" | Himesh Reshammiya | Himesh Reshammiya, Vineet Singh and Aman Trikha |
| 6. | "Khiladi" (Title Track) | Shabbir Ahamed | Vineet Singh, Aman Trikha, Yasraj, Alamgir Khan and Rajdeep |
| 7. | "Tu Hoor Pari" | R Mehndi | Javed Ali, Shreya Ghoshal, Chandrakala and Harshdeep Kaur |
| 8. | "Lonely" (Remix by Kiran Kamath) | Shabbir Ahamed | Himesh Reshammiya, Akshay Kumar, Honey Singh and Hamsika Iyer |
| 9. | "Hookah Bar" (Remix by DJ A Sen, DJ Amann Nagpal) | Himesh Reshammiya | Himesh Reshammiya, Vinit Singh and Aman Trikha |
| 10. | "Long Drive" ((Bhangra Mix) Remix by DJ A Sen, DJ Amann Nagpal) | Sameer | Mika Singh |
| 11. | "Balma" (Remix by Teenu Arora) | Sameer | Sreerama Chandra Mynampati and Shreya Ghoshal |
| 12. | "Khiladi title track" (Remix by Teenu Arora) | Shabbir Ahamed | Vinit Singh, Aman Trikha, Yasraj, Alamgir Khan and Rajdeep |
| 13. | "Khiladi 786 Mashup by DJ Kiran Kamath" | Shabbir Ahamed, Sameer and Himesh Reshammiya | Vinit Singh, Aman Trikha, Yasraj, Alamgir Khan, Rajdeep, Himesh Reshammiya, Akshay Kumar, Hamsika Iyer, Yo Yo Honey Singh, Sreerama Chandra Mynampati, Shreya Ghoshal and Mika Singh |

== Reception ==
=== Critical response ===
Taran Adarsh on Bollywood Hungama gave the movie 3.5/5 stars and said that it was "for lovers of hardcore masala films completely." Madhureeta Mukherjee from Times of India stated, "For those looking for some logic-less laugh time, groovy tunes topped with some todh-podh – this one could bring some action to your weekend."

It was renamed as Khiladi, 786 being a holy number in Islam, (Note: The dictionary definition of 786 at Wiktionary) for release but promos and ads of the film were banned in Pakistan.

=== Box office ===
==== India ====
Khiladi 786 opened to strong response at single screens but weak at multiplexes. It had good opening with a collection of around ₹87.5 million (US$910,000) on its first day. It netted ₹92.5 million (US$960,000) on its second day of release. Khiladi 786 had further growth of around 20% on Sunday, netting ₹115 million (US$1.2 million) bringing the total nett collections to around ₹293 million (US$3.0 million) at the end of its first weekend. The film had good collection of ₹450 million (US$4.7 million) in its first week.

It further netted around ₹105 million (US$1.1 million) in its second weekend. Khiladi 786 collected ₹201 million (US$2.1 million) in week two. The film netted ₹633 million (US$6.6 million) at the end of its theatrical run in domestic market and its distributor share was ₹328 million (US$3.4 million).

==== Overseas ====
Khiladi 786 had a poor reception overseas with around $0.5 million over the first weekend. It collected $1.5 million in ten days overseas.

=== Award nominations ===
- Himesh Reshammiya was nominated for Breakthrough Supporting Performance (Male) – Stardust Awards 2013.
