= Inder Kumar =

Indian actor (1973–2017)

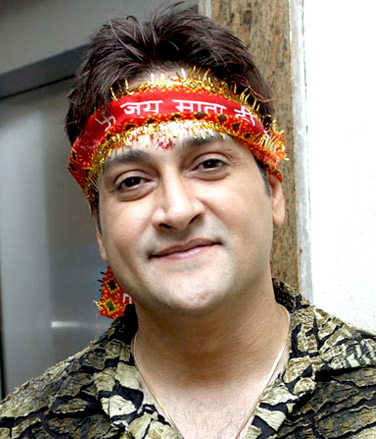
- Kumar in 2016
- Born: Inder Kumar Saraf; 26 August 1973; Jaipur, Rajasthan, India
- Died: 28 July 2017 (aged 43); Mumbai, Maharashtra, India
- Resting place: Versova crematorium
- Education: St. Xavier's High School, Fort (Mumbai), Sardar Vallabhbhai Patel Vidyalaya (Mumbai)
- Occupations: Model and actor
- Years active: 1996–2017
- Spouse(s): Sonal Kariya (m. 2003; div. 2003) Kamaljeet Kaur (m. 2009; div. 2009) Pallavi Saraf (m. 2013)
- Children: 2

Inder Kumar (26 August 1973 – 28 July 2017) was an Indian actor best known for playing supporting roles in Hindi films such as Wanted, Tumko Na Bhool Paayenge, Kahin Pyaar Na Ho Jaaye and Khiladiyon Ka Khiladi. He was a close friend of Salman Khan and appeared in many films, alongside him. He was last seen in the film Chhoti Si Guzaarish which was directed by Pragyesh Singh. He was shooting for a film titled Phati Padi Hai Yaar at the time of his death.

== Early life ==
He was born on 26 August 1973 in a Marwari family in Jaipur as Inder Kumar Saraf. He studied at St. Xavier's High School, Fort and Sardar Vallabhbhai Patel Vidyalaya (both in Mumbai), and completed his graduation. His mentor in movies was film publicist Rajoo Kariya who introduced him to film producers during the early days of his career.

== Personal life ==
He had been married thrice. His first marriage was in 2003 to his mentor Rajoo Kariya's daughter Sonal Kariya and they separated that year after 5 months while his wife was still pregnant with his first daughter Khushi. He dated Isha Koppikar on and off for 11 years. Later he married Kamaljeet Kaur (2009) but split within 2 months due to irreconcilable differences. In 2013 he married Pallavi Sarraf with whom he had a daughter, Bhavana (born early 2014).

== Film career ==
He made his debut with 1996 film Masoom, featuring in over 20 movies in a career lasting over twenty one years. He had a promising start in the 1990s with several notable films as a supporting actor such as Khiladiyon Ka Khiladi (1996), ''Ghoonghat' (1997), Kahin Pyaar Na Ho Jaaye (2000), Gaja Gamini (2000), Maa Tujhhe Salaam (2002) and Tumko Na Bhool Paayenge (2002). He also appeared on television in the Star Plus serial Kyunki Saas Bhi Kabhi Bahu Thi playing the part of Mihir Virani opposite Smriti Irani in 2002.

His career had started to suffer when he was bedridden for five years due to a broken vertebra from a helicopter fall while doing his own stunt on the set of the film Maseeha in 2002. After a hiatus he returned to acting appearing in the Bengali film Agnipath in 2005 which flopped. After several flops, he attempted a comeback in 2009 with his role as Salman Khan's friend in Wanted which was a blockbuster hit.

== Controversies ==
On 25 April 2014, Kumar was arrested by the Versova police, after a 22-year-old female model and aspiring actress registered an FIR alleging that he had raped and assaulted her with a promise of a role in movies. He claimed it was a consensual relationship and she was seeking revenge after he ended the relationship and went back to his wife. People of Bollywood distanced themselves from him and he was left with no friends, money or career when his daughter was only 15 months old. He was charged under sections 376 (rape), 324 (causing grievous hurt), and 506 (criminal intimidation) of the Indian Penal Code. On 9 May, the police asserted that the medical reports supported that the woman had been raped as well as assaulted. Kumar denied the allegations saying that he had a consensual relationship with the woman. His wife Pallavi defended him fiercely in public with a statement that he slipped up by having a consensual fling and during two days of incidents the claimant was freely moving in and out of her home alone in a cheerful mood to order food and buy alcohol to party at home with Inder. Inder apologized for leaving his wife for a short fling and he returned to his family. Subsequent to that, Kumar was granted bail on 10 June. The woman who accused him was arrested by police on 1 August 2014 in an unrelated case for robbing her sister's residence in the same locality of jewellery worth INR 10 lakh.

== Death ==
On 28 July 2017, Inder Kumar died after a cardiac arrest at his residence in the Four Bungalows neighborhood of Andheri in Mumbai at around 12.30 am. He was pronounced dead by 4 am.

== Filmography ==
Year	Title	Role	Language	Notes
1996	Khiladiyon Ka Khiladi	Ajay Malhotra	Hindi	
1996	Masoom	Aakash	Hindi	
1997	Ghoonghat	Vijay	Hindi	
1998	Tirchhi Topiwale	Amit Mehra	Hindi	
1998	Dand Nayak	Karan	Hindi	
2000	Baaghi	Surya (Suryaprakash Vidyashankar Pandey)	Hindi	
2000	Kunwara	Ajay	Hindi	
2000	Kahin Pyaar Na Ho Jaaye	Rahul Puglia	Hindi	
2000	Gaja Gamini	Kamdev, The God Of Love	Hindi	
2002	Maa Tujhhe Salaam	Capt. Irshad Khan	Hindi	
2002	Tumko Na Bhool Paayenge	Inder Saxena	Hindi	
2002	Hathyar	Amar Rane	Hindi	
2002	Maseeha	Shiva	Hindi	
2002	Kaaboo	Shankar / Tiger	Hindi	
2004	Ek Aur Amar Premm		Hindi	
2005	Agnipath	Vijay Mukherjee	Bengali	
2006	Aryan – Unbreakable	Ranjeet Singh	Hindi	
2009	Paying Guests	Murlinjknk	Hindi	
2009	Wanted	Ajay Singh Shekhawat	Hindi	
2010	Yagam	Antony	Telugu	
2011	Yeh Dooriyan	Aditya	Hindi	
2017	Manus Ek Mati		Marathi	
2018	Krina		Hindi	
2018	Dharasnan		Bengali	
2019	Phati Padi Hai Yaar	Rishi	Hindi	Posthumous release
2020	Its My Life	Abhishek's brother-in-law	Hindi	Posthumous release

=== Television ===
Year	Serial	Role	Ref.
2001	Rangoli		
2002	Kyunki Saas Bhi Kabhi Bahu Thi	Mihir Virani	
2009	CID	Inder Narayan	
2013	Fear Files: Darr Ki Sacchi Tasvirein		
