= Mawk'allaqta =

Mawk'allaqta or Mawk'a Llaqta (Quechua mawk'a ancient, llaqta place (village, town, city, country, nation), "ancient place", hispanicized and mixed spellings Maucallacta, Maukallacta, Maukallakta, Maukallaqta, Mauk'allaqta, Mauca Llacta, Mauka Llacta, Mauka Llaqta, Mauk'a Llaqta) may refer to:

- Mawk'allaqta, Castilla, an archaeological site in the Castilla Province, Arequipa Region, Peru
- Mawk'allaqta, Espinar, an archaeological site in the Espinar Province, Cusco Region, Peru
- Mawk'allaqta, La Unión, an archaeological site in the La Unión Province, Arequipa Region, Peru
- Mawk'allaqta, Melgar, an archaeological site in the Melgar Province, Puno Region, Peru
- Mawk'allaqta, Paruro, an archaeological site in the Paruro Province, Cusco Region, Peru
- Mawk'allaqta, Sandia, an archaeological site in the Sandia Province, Puno Region, Peru
