= International Khiladi =

1999 Indian film by Umesh Mehra

- Poster
- Directed by: Umesh Mehra
- Written by: Umesh Mehra; Ved Prakash Sharma
- Produced by: Keshu Ramsay
- Starring: Akshay Kumar; Twinkle Khanna
- Cinematography: S. Pappu
- Edited by: Kamal Saigal
- Music by: Aadesh Shrivastava
- Distributed by: Eros Entertainment
- Release date: 26 March 1999
- Running time: 180 minutes
- Country: India
- Language: Hindi
- Budget: ₹7.75 crore (equivalent to ₹33 crore or US$3.9 million in 2023)
- Box office: ₹16.19 crore (equivalent to ₹70 crore or US$8.2 million in 2023)

International Khiladi (transl. International Player) is a 1999 Indian Hindi-language action drama film directed by Umesh Mehra starring Akshay Kumar and Twinkle Khanna in the lead roles. In an interview with Lehren Network, Khanna said that the film did not follow a conventional script while Kumar stated that the film had more romance than action.

International Khiladi was released on 26 March 1999 and became a below average venture at the box office.

== Plot ==
Payal is a Journalist who along with her cameraman Focus have been assigned the task of interviewing the world's highest ranking gangster named Rahul alias Devraj. In the process, Payal and Devraj fall in love with each other much to the opposition of Devraj's guardian Bismillah, Lt.Colonel Amit and Payal's brother Ravi. Ravi is later killed with Devraj being framed and arrested. Payal testifies against him and Devraj is sentenced to be hanged. After learning about Bismillah's sudden death, Devraj escapes from custody and begins to plot vengeance against his enemies, including Payal and Ravi's real killer. It is revealed that Amit was the one who killed Bismillah and Ravi and also joined Thakral to frame Devraj, but Amit later betrays Thakral and kills him. Amit then takes Devraj on a flight where Devraj kills him and reunites with Payal.

== Cast ==
- Akshay Kumar as Rahul / Devraj
- Twinkle Khanna as Payal, Ravi's sister.
- Rajat Bedi as Amit
- Vivek Shauq as Ravi, Payal's brother.
- Gulshan Grover as Thakral
- Mukesh Khanna as Bismillah, Devraj's guardian.
- Johnny Lever as Focus, Payal's Cameraman.
- Mahesh Anand as Naresh, Henchman of Thakral
- Asrani as Payal's boss
- Avtar Gill as Defence Lawyer D'souza
- Shahbaaz Khan as Police Commissioner Gautam
- Subbiraj as S.P. Sharma
- Ram Mohan as Prosecuting Lawyer Baburao
- Vivek Vaswani as Vivek Shrivastav
- Gajendra Chouhan as Suraj, Rahul's father
- Shagufta Ali as Smita, Rahul's mother
- Omkar Kapoor as Young Rahul

== Production ==
The film was co-produced by Indian businessman Ajay Virmani. It was shot in Varanasi and Mumbai.

== Soundtrack ==
All lyrics are written by Dev Kohli; all music is composed by Aadesh Shrivastava.

Songs
No.	Title	Playback	Length
1.	"Chookar Mere Man Ko (dil mein hulchul si)"	Kumar Sanu, Alka Yagnik	6:06
2.	"Halka Halka Dard Hai"	Kumar Sanu, Kavita Krishnamurthy	5:07
3.	"International Khiladi"	Sonu Nigam	4:11
4.	"Kudi Kanwari"	Alka Yagnik, Gurdas Maan	6:31
5.	"Lutiya Gaya"	Sudesh Bhosle, Jaspinder Narula, Ila Arun & Tauseef Akhtar	4:24
6.	"Saiyan Saiyan"	Udit Narayan, Alka Yagnik	3:30
7.	"Yaar Maine Ek Sapna Dekha"	Udit Narayan	5:20

Rediff.com noted that the film's songs "seem to be good".
