= List of Hindi horror films =

Hindi-language horror films have been a subgenre of the Hindi film industry in India since the birth of Hindi films. These films tend to mimic the characteristics and themes of horror films around the world. The themes explored consist of haunted houses, evil spirits and demonic forces, among other.

Raaz (2002) has been recognized as the best horror film in Bollywood history, due to its popularity, critical acclaim, and franchise legacy.

Popularly Bipasha Basu is recognized as the "Scream Queen" of Indian cinema for her frequent and successful list of movies in this genre.

This is a list of Indian horror films in Hindi.

== Films ==
Year	Film	Director
1935	Shadi Ki Raat	Mohan Dayaram Bhavnani
1940	Anarbala	A.M. Khan
1946	Khooni	K. L. Kahan
1949	Bhedi Bungla	Bhagwan Dada
1949	Mahal	Kamal Amrohi
1958	Madhumati	Bimal Roy
1962	Bees Saal Baad	Biren Nag
1962	Tower House	Nisar Ahmad Ansari
1963	Shikari	Mohammed Hussain
1964	Woh Kaun Thi?	Raj Khosla
1964	Kohra	Biren Nag
1965	Gumnaam	Raja Nawathe
1965	Bhoot Bungla	Mehmood
1965	Poonam Ki Raat	Kishore Sahu
1965	Noor Mahal	Noshir Engineer
1966	Yeh Raat Phir Na Aayegi	Brij Sadanah
1966	Sau Saal Baad	B.K. Dubey
1967	Anita	Raj Khosla
1972	Do Gaz Zameen Ke Neeche	Tulsi Ramsay; Shyam Ramsay
1975	Andhera	Tulsi Ramsay; Shyam Ramsay
1976	Nagin	Rajkumar Kohli
1977	Jadu Tona	Ravikant Nagaich
1978	Darwaza	Tulsi Ramsay; Shyam Ramsay
1979	Aur Kaun?	Tulsi Ramsay; Shyam Ramsay
1979	Bhayaanak	S. U. Syed
1980	Jaani Dushman	Rajkumar Kohli
1980	Gehrayee	Aruna Raje; Vikas Desai
1981	Mangalsutra	Vijay B.
1981	Dahshat	Shyam Ramsay & Tulsi Ramsay
1984	Purana Mandir	Shyam Ramsay & Tulsi Ramsay
1986	Tahkhana	Shyam Ramsay & Tulsi Ramsay
1987	Dak Bangla	Keshu Ramsay
1988	Woh Phir Aayegi	B.R. Ishara
1988	Bhayaanak Mahal	Baby
1988	Ajnabi Saaya	Prasun Banerjee
1988	Veerana	Ramsay Brothers
1988	Kabrastan	Mohan Bhakri
1989	Purani Haveli	Shyam Ramsay & Tulsi Ramsay
1989	Khooni Murda	Mohan Bhakri
1990	Bandh Darwaza	Shyam Ramsay & Tulsi Ramsay
1990	Amavas Ki Raat	Mohan Bhakri
1990	Lekin	Gulzar
1990	Shaitani Ilaaka	Kiran Ramsay
1990	Kafan	Dhirendra Bohra
1991	House No. 13	Baby
1991	Aakhri Cheekh	Kiran Ramsay
1991	Khooni Raat	J.D. Lawrence
1991	Khooni Panja	Vinod Talwar
1991	Roohani Taaqat	Mohan Bhakri
1992	Junoon	Mahesh Bhatt
1992	Raat	Ram Gopal Varma
1992	Khooni Dracula	Harinam Singh
1993	Mahakaal	Shyam Ramsay & Tulsi Ramsay
1993	Zakhmi Rooh	Pawan Kumar
1994	Raat Ke Gunaah	Rajeev-Neelabh
1996	Papi Gudia	Lawrence D'Souza
1997	Bhayaanak Panja	Rajesh Mittal
1997	Chudail	P. Chandrakumar
1997	Darawani Haveli	Kumar Rakesh Sinha
1997	Pret Aatma	R. Mittal & Rajesh Mittal
1998	Khofnak Mahal	Sushil Vyas
1998	Pyasi Chudail	P. Chandrakumar
1998	Laash	K. Mansukhini
1998	Pyasi Aatma	P. Chandrakumar
1999	Khooni Ilaaka:The Prohibited Area	Jitendra Chawda
1999	Chandaal Aatma	S.R. Pratap
1999	Khopdi: The Skull	Ramesh U Lakhiani
1999	Dracula	Bhooshan Lal
1999	Sar Kati Laash	Teerat Singh
2002	Raaz	Vikram Bhatt
2003	Bhoot	Ram Gopal Varma
2003	Darna Mana Hai	Prawaal Raman
2003	Saaya	Anurag Basu
2003	Hawa	Guddu Dhanoa
2003	Kucch To Hai	Anurag Basu & Anil V. Kumar
2004	Rudraksh	Mani Shankar
2004	Vaastu Shastra	Saurab Usha Narang
2004	Krishna Cottage	Santram Varma
2004	Rakht	Mahesh Manjrekar
2004	Hum Kaun Hai?	Ravi Shankar Sharma
2005	Kaal	Soham Shah
2005	Anjaane: The Unknown	Harry W. Fernandes
2005	Naina	Shripal Morakhia
2006	Aatma	Deepak Ramsay
2006	Darna Zaroori Hai	Sajid Khan, Ram Gopal Varma, Prawaal Raman, Vivek Shah, Jiji Philip, J. D. Chakravarthy, Manish Gupta
2006	Eight: The Power of Shani	Karan Razdan
2007	Darling	Ram Gopal Varma
2007	Ghutan	Shyam Ramsay
2007	Bhool Bhulaiyaa	Priyadarshan
2007	Chhodon Naa Yaar	Dilip Sood
2007	Gauri: The Unborn	Akku Akbar
2007	Fear	Vikram Bhatt
2008	1920	Vikram Bhatt
2008	Bhootnaath	Vivek Sharma
2008	Phoonk	Ram Gopal Varma
2009	Raaz: The Mystery Continues	Mohit Suri
2009	13 B	Vikram Kumar
2009	Agyaat	Ram Gopal Varma
2010	Help	Rajeev Virani
2010	Mallika	Wilson Louis
2010	A Flat	Hemant Madhukar
2010	Phoonk 2	Milind Gadagkar
2010	Hisss	Jennifer Lynch
2010	Fired	Sajit Warrier
2010	Click	Sangeeth Sivan
2010	Bhoot and Friends	Karanjeet "Kittu" Saluja
2010	Rokkk	Rajesh Ranshinge
2010	Shaapit	Vikram Bhatt
2010	Kaalo	Wilson Louis
2011	Haunted - 3D	Vikram Bhatt
2011	Ragini MMS	Pawan Kirpalani
2011	404	Prawaal Raman
2012	?: A Question Mark	Allyson Patel & Yash Dave
2012	Bhoot Returns	Ram Gopal Varma
2012	1920: The Evil Returns	Bhushan Patel
2012	Raaz 3D	Vikram Bhatt
2012	Ghost	Puja Jatinder Bedi
2012	Dangerous Ishhq	Vikram Bhatt
2013	Horror Story	Ayush Raina
2013	Aatma - Feel It Around You	Suparn Verma
2013	Rise of the Zombie	Luke Kenny and Devaki Singh
2013	Ek Thi Daayan	Kannan Iyer
2013	Go Goa Gone	Raj & DK
2013	3G	Sheershak Anand & Shantanu Ray Chhibber
2014	Machhli Jal Ki Rani Hai	Debaloy Dey
2014	Darr @ the Mall	Pavan Kirpalani
2014	Neighbours: They Are Vampires	Shyam Ramsay
2014	Ragini MMS 2	Bhushan Patel
2014	Pizza	Akshay Akkineni
2014	Creature 3D	Vikram Bhatt
2014	Trip to Bhangarh	Jitendra Pawar
2014	Mumbai 125 KM	Hemant Madhukar
2014	Room - The Mystery	Faisal Khan
2014	3 A.M	Vishal Mahadkar
2014	6-5=2	Bharat Jain
2014	Bhoothnath Returns	Nitesh Tiwari
2015	Khamoshiyan	Karan Darra
2015	Alone	Bhushan Patel
2016	1920 London	Tinu Suresh Desai
2016	Raaz Reboot	Vikram Bhatt
2016	The Last Tale of Kayenaat	Iqbal Baksh
2016	Saansein	Rajiv S Ruia
2017	Mona Darling	Shashi Sudigala
2017	Dobaara: See Your Evil	Prawaal Raman
2017	The Final Exit	Dhwanil Mehta
2017	The House Next Door	Milind Rau
2017	Golmaal Again	Rohit Shetty
2017	Phillauri	Anshai Lal
2017	Toast With The Ghost	Ankit Jaiswal
2017	Sheitaan	Sameer Khan
2018	1921	Vikram Bhatt
2018	Pari	Prosit Roy
2018	Lupt	Prabhuraj
2018	The Past	Gagan Puri
2018	Tumbbad	Rahi Anil Barve
2018	Stree	Amar Kaushik
2019	Ghost	Vikram Bhatt
2019	Mushkil: Fear Behind You	Rajiv S. Ruia
2019	Amavas	Bhushan Patel
2020	Laxmii	Raghava Lawrence
2020	Bulbbul	Anvita Dutt
2020	Bhoot – Part One: The Haunted Ship	Bhanu Pratap Singh
2020	Haunted Hills	Sanjeev Kumar Rajput
2020	Ghost Stories	Karan Johar, Dibakar Banerjee, Zoya Akhtar, Anurag Kashyap
2020	Kaali Khuhi	Terrie Samundra
2020	Durgamati	G. Ashok
2021	Roohi	Hardik Mehta
2021	Bhoot Police	Pavan Kirpalani
2021	The Wife	Sarmad Khan
2021	Dybbuk	Jay K
2021	Chhorii	Vishal Furia
2022	Khel Kood Aur Bhoot	Adnan Malik
2022	Bhool Bhulaiyaa 2	Anees Bazmee
2022	Phone Bhoot	Gurmmeet Singh
2022	Blurr	Ajay Bahl
2022	Bhediya	Amar Kaushik
2022	Judaa Hoke Bhi	Vikram Bhatt
2023	U-Turn	Arif Khan
2023	1920 Horrors of the Heart	Krishna Bhatt
2023	Aseq	Sarim Momin
2024	Shaitaan	Vikas Bahl
2024	Munjya	Aditya Sarpotdar
2024	Kakuda	Aditya Sarpotdar
2024	Bloody Ishq	Vikram Bhatt
2024	Stree 2	Amar Kaushik
2024	A Wedding Story	Abhinav Pareek
2024	Adbhut	Sabbir Khan
2024	Bhool Bhulaiyaa 3	Anees Bazmee
2025	Chhorii 2	Vishal furia
2025	The Bhootnii	Sidhaant Sachdev
2025	Kapkapiii	Sangeeth Sivan
2025	Oye Bhootni Ke	Ajay Kailash Yadav
2025	Maa	Vishal Furia
2025	Nikita Roy	Kussh S. Sinha
2025	Thamma	Aditya Sarpotdar
2025	Baramulla	Aditya Suhas Jambhale
2025	Kaal Trighori	Nitin Vaidya
2026	Bhooth Bangla	Priyadarshan
2026	Haunted 3D: Echoes of the Past	Vikram Bhatt
2026	Bokshi	Bhargav Saikia
2026	Nayyi Navelli	Balaji Mohan

== See also ==
- List of Hindi horror shows
- List of Bollywood thriller films
- List of Bollywood comedy films
- List of Indian horror films
- Bollywood content lists
