= List of Indian horror films =

This is a list of notable Indian horror films.

The horror-comedy hit Stree 2 grossed over ₹875–880 crore worldwide

== History ==
=== 1940s–1960s ===
The first real horror movie made by the Indian film industry was Kamal Amrohi's Mahal in 1949. The film (which starred Ashok Kumar and Madhubala in leading roles) proved a major box office hit, leading Madhubala and Lata Mangeshkar into stardom. Hemant Kumar's Bees Saal Baad (released in 1962) was another film which proved to be a box-office success. This film ignited the huge increase in popularity of horror-genre movies in the following years. Gumnaam (1965) and Bhoot Bungla (also 1965) were some of the other major horror movies which were seen in theaters at this time.

One of the major aspects behind the success of the horror movies of this decade (apart from a good storyline) was the presence of high-class music and singing, a Bollywood trademark. These films also had well-known actors and directors, which helped present some of the most chilling scenes in Indian cinema. Background music in films like Mahal and Gumnaam "madhumati" and "Woh kaun thi" helped to create the magic. Some of the films (like Gumnaam and Bees Saal Baad) played down their supernatural elements.

=== 1970s–1990s ===
This period saw the popularity of horror films in India increasing, with a number of popular titles. Do Gaz Zameen Ke Neeche (released in 1972 and directed by the Ramsay brothers) proved successful, laying the foundation for horror films in the following years. 1976 saw Bollywood's first-ever combination of horror and fantasy in Rajkumar Kohli's Nagin. The star-studded film proved a major box-office hit. Two years later, Kohli gave Bollywood one of its biggest hits in Jaani Dushman. It is considered to be the biggest horror movies to have come out from Indian film industry to date by many experts. The film proved to be a cult one and gave inspiration to the upcoming horror movies. Other horror movies released at this time were Darwaza (1978), Jadu Tona (1977), Aur Kaun? (1979) Saboot, Gehrayee, Red Rose, Guest House, Dahshat and Sannata (all 1980). Gehrayee (inspired by The Exorcist) saw Padmini Kolhapure playing a young girl (Linda Blair's character in The Exorcist), while Rajesh Khanna played a psychotic killer in Red Rose.

The 1980s saw many Indian filmmakers trying their hands in the horror-movie industry because of its high profitability. One name that became very successful at that time in the said genre was Javed Khan. He was considered every producers blue eyed boy when casting the lead hero of their horror films. His debut film in the same genre Apradhi kaun (1984) earned 100% at the box office in the first week. Some successful titles were the Ramsay brothers' Purana Mandir (1984), Saamri (1985), Veerana (1985) Tahkhana (1986), Dak Bangla (1987), Purani Haveli (1989), Shaitani Ilaaka and Bandh Darwaza (both 1990). Most of the movies proved successful; the Ramsay brothers' horror factory continued churning out film after film. However, notable horror movies stars of the 1980s, Javed Khan, Rakesh Roshan, Navin Nischal, Dilip Dhawan, Aruna Irani, Deepak Parashar, and Sriprada.

During the 90s, the majority of horror movies were unsuccessful at box office. There was only one hit horror movie at the time which was Raat (1992).

=== 2000–present ===
After the disappointing horror films in the 90s, it would be 10 years after Raat before another horror hit. This was 2002's Raaz directed by Vikram Bhatt. Raaz alongside Raat director, Ram Gopal Varma's 2003 hit Bhoot, reinvigorated horror films at the Indian box office. The two directors continued making horror with Bhatt finding equal financial success with titles such as 1920 (2008); Haunted 3D (2011) and Horror Story (2013). Whilst Varma similarly had further success with Phoonk (2008), however unlike Vikram Bhatt, Varma's horror offerings were duds at the box office post 2009 (Agyaat and Bhoot Returns).

Currently there are dozens of horror films produced every year in India, prominent recent examples include Ragini MMS and its sequel, the self-proclaimed horrex (horror and sex) Ragini MMS 2 (2014). Bipasha Basu has been dubbed by the Indian media as Bollywood's very own scream queen, having starred in 7 horror films from Raaz (2002) to Alone (2015).

== See also ==
- List of Indian comedy films
- List of Indian romance films
