= Ramsay Brothers =

Indian film makers

Ramsay Brothers is a pseudonym or brand name used for a family of Bollywood filmmakers, the sons and grandsons of F.U. Ramsay. They are best known for making horror films synonymous with the name "Ramsay Brothers" in India.

== Biography ==
The Ramsay family's actual surname is Ramsinghani and they are a Hindu family hailing from the Sindh province in present-day Pakistan. They belong to a trading caste, and in the early decades of the 20th century, the Ramsinghani family used to run electronics shops (mainly radio sets) in Karachi and Lahore. In 1947, after the Partition of India, they were forced to flee their native land. Penniless and destitute, Fatehchand U. Ramsay (F.U. Ramsay) came with his extended family, including his wife, 7 sons and 2 daughters, to India. They settled in Bombay and Fatehchand, along with his older sons, set up a tiny electronics shop in Lamington Road, thanks to a dealership agreement with the same manufacturer of radio sets and other electronics goods who had been their principal in Karachi. The shop did reasonably well, but the family was large, and income was not sufficient.

Then, as is now, Bombay was the center of showbiz in India. For reasons that are not clearly understood, but perhaps lured by the lottery-like wealth which the film industry brandished, Fatehchand joined a group of other Sindhi refugee businessmen to produce the film Shaheed-e-Azam Bhagat Singh (1954). It was a dismal flop, despite featuring a rendition of Sarfaroshi Ki Tamanna by Mohammad Rafi. A long hiatus followed, but the lure of films was great and Fatehchand later produced the films Rustam Sohrab (1963) and Ek Nanhi Munni Ladki Thi (1970). Both films flopped and the Ramsays were reeling under huge debts when inspiration struck. In one scene in Ek Nanhi Munni Ladki Thi, Prithviraj Kapoor wears a devil's mask to carry out a robbery and terrifies Mumtaz. The film didn't work, but it was noticed that the “monster” sequence was popular with the audience. This encouraged the Ramsays to make Do Gaz Zameen Ke Neeche (1972), based on a story narrated by Fatehchand's daughter Asha to her father. The film was advertised in a half-hour, late-night show on radio, which helped it get the “Houseful” board up when it was released. Its success sparked a trend of shoe-string budget movies that were wrapped up in a month with a crew of 15.

The Ramsay Brothers have made more than 30 horror films in India, which epitomes the lower depths of 1980s Bollywood sleaze and gore, but which have secured their place in Hindi cinema's hall of fame as the pioneers of Indian horror films. They are producers, directors and editors for many famous Hindi horror movies such as Darwaza, Saboot, Guest House, Purana Mandir, Veerana, Purani Haveli, Bandh Darwaza and the TV series, Zee Horror Show.

Their first film, Do Gaz Zameen Ke Neeche, proved to be a milestone for them and for the Indian horror film industry. At a time when an average Hindi film took about a year and INR 50 lakhs to complete, Do Gaz Zameen Ke Neeche was shot in 40 days on a budget of Rs 3.5 lakhs. All 7 Ramsay brothers boarded buses with small-time actors, a sparse film crew, their wives and parents and drove to a government guesthouse in Mahabaleshwar that cost Rs 12 a room – they took 7 rooms. They didn't spend on sets because they shot on location. They didn't spend on costumes because these were picked out of actors’ wardrobes. The cameras were all borrowed. All the departments for making the film were taken care of by the 7 brothers. The film ran to full houses in the first week after its release. It made Rs. 45 lakhs at the Indian box office.

Their 1980s horror films are generally a combination of sex and supernatural entities. Their film Mahakaal in 1993 was also successful and it was a mixture of horror, romance and comedy.

Actor and producer Ajay Devgn and Priti Sinha have acquired the rights to produce a biopic on the Ramsay Brothers. The film is tentatively titled The Ramsay Biopic. The script will be written by Ritesh Shah.

== Filmography ==
Films

Year	Film	Directed by
1971	Nakuli Shaan	Shyam Ramsay & Tulsi Ramsay
1972	Do Gaz Zameen Ke Neeche	Shyam Ramsay & Tulsi Ramsay
1975	Andhera	Shyam Ramsay & Tulsi Ramsay
1978	Darwaza	Shyam Ramsay & Tulsi Ramsay
1979	Aur Kaun?	Shyam Ramsay & Tulsi Ramsay
1980	Saboot	Shyam Ramsay & Tulsi Ramsay
1980	Guest House	Shyam Ramsay & Tulsi Ramsay
1981	Dahshat	Shyam Ramsay & Tulsi Ramsay
1981	Sannata	Shyam Ramsay & Tulsi Ramsay
1981	Hotel	Shyam Ramsay & Tulsi Ramsay
1981	Ghungroo Ki Awaaz	Shyam Ramsay & Tulsi Ramsay
1984	Purana Mandir	Shyam Ramsay & Tulsi Ramsay
1985	Telephone	Shyam Ramsay & Tulsi Ramsay
1985	3D Saamri	Shyam Ramsay & Tulsi Ramsay
1985	Haveli	Keshu Ramsay
1986	Tahkhana	Shyam Ramsay & Tulsi Ramsay
1986	Avinash	Umesh Mehra
1986	Om (Unreleased film)	Shyam Ramsay & Tulsi Ramsay
1987	Dak Bangla	Keshu Ramsay
1988	Veerana	Shyam Ramsay & Tulsi Ramsay
1988	Mera Shikar	Keshu Ramsay
1989	Purani Haveli	Shyam Ramsay & Tulsi Ramsay
1989	Khoj	Keshu Ramsay
1989	Mahal	Keshu Ramsay
1990	Shaitani Ilaaka	Kiran Ramsay
1990	Bandh Darwaza	Shyam Ramsay & Tulsi Ramsay
1991	Police Matthu Dada / Inspector Dhanush	Shyam Ramsay & Tulsi Ramsay
1991	Aakhri Cheekh	Kiran Ramsay
1991	Ajooba Kudrat Ka	Shyam Ramsay & Tulsi Ramsay
1993	Vishnu Vijaya / Ashaant	Keshu Ramsay
1993	Mahakaal	Shyam Ramsay & Tulsi Ramsay
2000	Talashi	Shyam Ramsay
2003	Dhund	Shyam Ramsay
2007	Ghutan	Shyam Ramsay
2010	Bachao - Inside Bhoot Hai	Shyam Ramsay
2014	Neighbours	Shyam Ramsay

TV Series

Year	Title	Channel
1993–2001	Zee Horror Show	Zee TV

== The family ==
The family includes 7 brothers, who made cult horror films mainly in the 1970's and 1980's. The brothers are Kumar Ramsay (oldest), Gangu Ramsay, Tulsi Ramsay, Arjun Ramsay, Shyam Ramsay, Keshu Ramsay and Kiran Ramsay. The brothers worked together for most of their careers and divided the various departments of filmmaking among them to produce films. Kumar Ramsay wrote the scripts, Gangu Ramsay took care of the cinematography, Kiran Ramsay managed the sound department, Keshu Ramsay handled the production, Arjun Ramsay took care of the editing and both Shyam Ramsay and Tulsi Ramsay handled the direction.

They are a team of 7 brothers:

- Kumar Ramsay
- Keshu Ramsay
- Tulsi Ramsay
- Kiran Ramsay
- Shyam Ramsay
- Gangu Ramsay
- Arjun Ramsay
- Asha Ramsay and Kamla Ramsay were the two daughters of Fatehchand U. Ramsay, they were the beloved sisters of the 7 Ramsay brothers.

== See also ==
- List of Hindi horror films
