= Kiran Ramsay =

Indian film producer

Karan Ramsay (alias Kiran Ramsay) is a producer, sound designer and director of Bollywood films. He was one of the Ramsey Brothers, a group of siblings who worked as directors, producers and editors in the Bollywood industry. His brothers were Shyam Ramsay, Kumar Ramsay, Keshu Ramsay Tulsi Ramsay Gangu Ramsay and Arjun Ramsay.

== Producer ==
Year	film
1998	2001: Do Hazaar Ek
1989	Khoj
1978	Darwaza
2008	Good Luck!

== Director ==
Year	film
1991	Aakhri Cheekh
1990	Shaitani Ilaaka

== Sound Department ==
Year	film	as Sound Department
2006	Family: Ties of Blood	sound designer
2005	Insan	audiographer
2004	Khakee	audiographer
2003	Dhund: The Fog	sound
2002	Maseeha	sound engineer
2000	Khiladi 420	sound engineer
1999	International Khiladi	audiographer
1997	Mr. & Mrs. Khiladi	audiographer
1996	Khiladiyon Ka Khiladi	audiographer -as Kiran
1995	Sabse Bada Khiladi	sound
1993	Lootere	sound recordist
1989	Saaya	audiographer
1988	Veerana	sound
1987	Dak Bangla	sound
1986	Avinash	sound
1985/I	Telephone	audiographer
1985	Saamri	audiographer
1985	Haveli	audiographer
1984	Purana Mandir	sound
1981	Ghungroo Ki Awaaz	audiographer
1981	Hotel	audiographer
1981	Dahshat	sound engineer
1980	Andhera	sound
1980	Saboot	sound engineer
1980	Guest House	sound engineer
1978	Darwaza	sound engineer

== As cameraman ==
Year	film	as camera Department
1980	Andhera	associate cameraman
1978	Darwaza	associate camera operator
