= Keshu Ramsay =

Indian film director

- Born: 1955
- Died: 19 October 2010 (aged 54–55); Mumbai. Maharashtra, India
- Occupations: Film producer; film director
- Spouse: Kavita Ramsay
- Children: Aryeman Ramsay

Keshu Ramsay (1955 – 2010) was an Indian producer and film director. He was one of the Ramsay Brothers, a group of siblings who worked as directors, producers and editors in the Hindi film industry. The brothers consist of Shyam Ramsay, Kumar Ramsay, Tulsi Ramsay and Kiran Ramsay. He had most notably produced the Khiladi series.

== Filmography ==
=== Producer ===
Year	Title	Notes
1980	Guest House	
1986	Avinash	
1991	Saugandh	
1992	Mr. Bond	
1995	Sabse Bada Khiladi	
1995	Paandav	
1996	Khiladiyon Ka Khiladi	
1997	Mr and Mrs Khiladi	
1999	International Khiladi	
2000	Khiladi 420	
2004	Khakee	
2005	Insan	
2006	Family: Ties of Blood	

=== Director ===
Year	Title	Notes
1985	Haveli	
1987	Dak Bangla	
1988	Mera Shikar	
1989	Khoj	
1989	Mahal	
1990	Saaya	
1993	Ashaant	

=== Cinematographer ===
- Do Gaz Zameen Ke Neeche (1972)
- Andhera (1975)
- Darwaza (1978)
- Saboot (1980)

=== Actor ===
- Aur Kaun? (1979)
- Dahshat (1981)
