= Kumar Ramsay =

Indian film screenwriter (1936-2021)

- Born: 1936
- Died: 8 July 2021 (aged 84–85); Hiranandani, Mumbai
- Occupations: Screenwriter, Producer
- Spouse: Sheela
- Children: 3 sons
- Family: Ramsay Brothers

Kumar Ramsay was an Indian films screenwriter and producer, and the members of Ramsay Brothers. He is known for movies like Telephone 1985, Andhera 1975 and Rustam Sohrab 1963. He was the son of F.U. Ramsay.

== Filmography ==
=== Screenwriter ===
- Rustam Sohrab 1963
- Ek Nanhi Munni Ladki Thi 1970
- Andhera 1975
- Darwaza 1978
- Aur Kaun? 1979

== Death ==
He died on 8 July 2021 in Mumbai due to Cardiac arrest at the age of 85. He was the eldest Brother in Ramsay family.
