= 2001: Do Hazaar Ek =

2001
- Directed by: Raj N. Sippy
- Written by: Anand S. Vardhan (dialogues)
- Screenplay by: Kumar Ramsay
- Story by: Ved Prakash Sharma
- Produced by: Kiran Ramsay
- Starring: Jackie Shroff; Dimple Kapadia; Rajat Bedi; Tabu
- Cinematography: Gangu Ramsay
- Edited by: V. N. Mayekar
- Music by: Anand Raaj Anand
- Production company: Om Films
- Distributed by: Tips Industries
- Release date: 20 February 1998
- Country: India
- Language: Hindi
- Box office: ₹4.47 crore

2001: Do Hazaar Ek, shortly called 2001, is a 1998 Indian Hindi-language murder mystery film directed by Raj N. Sippy and produced by the Kiran Ramsay. It stars Jackie Shroff, Dimple Kapadia, Rajat Bedi, Tabu in the lead roles.

== Plot ==
Following the brutal slaying of a call-girl Julie in Mumbai, two police inspectors, namely Anil Kumar Sharma and Rajat Bedi are assigned to investigate and bring the culprit(s) to book. Anil and Rajat note that the killer leaves "2001" marked on the body of the victim. Anil learns that the man staying in Julie's room is a prominent Member of State Parliament, Ramaswamy, and would like to list him as a suspect.

Julie's death is followed by more killings in the same style, and killed ones are advocates P. K. Sarkari and Kajal, and a builder Krishna Rao. Then minister Ramaswamy is attacked, but survives and is hospitalized. When he regains consciousness for a brief period of time, he points an accusing finger at Rajat and then relapses. Not wanting to take any chance, Police Commissioner Malik places Rajat under house arrest. Then Anil comes across some evidence that links the killing to none other than Malik himself, while Rajat starts suspecting Anil and gathers evidence against Anil.

Roshni writes a letter and gives it to Billo, who then shows to Anil and Rajat; it is revealed that Roshni was behind the all the murders. She then goes to Ameerchand's house with a bomb being attached to her and threatens to blow herself along with him and the whole mansion, but in the meantime Anil and Rajat show up and stop her. Anil feels bad for Roshni as he puts her in the jail and it is revealed that it was Anil himself behind all the murders as he leaves the "2001" mark.

He then goes to Ameerchand's house to murder him and reveals that he did all the murders to avenge his families death for which Ameerchand was responsible along with his henchmens but before he can kill Ameerchand, Rajat stops him. Despite not listening to Rajat, he reluctantly shoots at Anil's leg but accidentally shoots his chest, killing him. Billo is heartbroken and upset about killing his best friend like that, upon hearing the truth from Roshni and realising the whole story. Rajat then goes to Ameerchand's mansion, takes downs his henchmen and then locks up Ameerchand with steel chains. In the end Rajat uses the rocket launcher at the mansion and destroys it, thus ending Ameerchand and his evil activities once for all.

== Cast ==
- Jackie Shroff as Inspector Anil Sharma
- Dimple Kapadia as Mrs. Roshni Anil Sharma
- Rajat Bedi as Inspector Rajat Bedi, Billo's love interest.
- Tabu as Billo, Rajat's love interest.
- Deven Verma as Billo's Uncle
- Mohan Joshi as Police Commissioner Malik
- Suresh Oberoi as Ameerchand
- Sadashiv Amrapurkar as Minister Ramaswamy
- Gulshan Grover as Krishna Rao
- Sharat Saxena as Advocate P. K. Sarkari
- Navneet Nishan as Advocate Kajal
- Upasana Singh as Julie
- Kishore Bhanushali as Havaldar
- Mukesh Khanna as Dr. Vishal Sharma, Anil's father. (guest appearance)

== Soundtrack ==
2001

Soundtrack album by Anand Raaj Anand
- Released: 1997
- Genre: Feature film soundtrack
- Label: Time Audio

Track	Singer	Lyricist
"Teri Yeh Bindiya"	Hariharan, Preeti Uttam Singh	Dev Kohli
"Tu Qatil Tera Dil Qatil"	Udit Narayan, Kavita Krishnamurthy	Manoj Darpan
"Teri Meri Dosti (Happy Version)"	Kumar Sanu, Udit Narayan	Dev Kohli
"Teri Meri Dosti (Sad Version)"	Mohammed Aziz	Dev Kohli
"Yahi To Pyar Hai"	Mohammed Aziz, Kavita Krishnamurthy	Dev Kohli
"Rappa Rappa Rum Pum Pum"	Aditya Narayan	Dev Kohli
"Neend Udaye"	Alka Yagnik	Anand Raaj Anand
"Yun Na Rootho"	Kumar Sanu, Anuradha Paudwal	Dev Kohli

== Reception ==
Komal Nahta of Film Information was critical of the film, saying it "does not have the chill and thrill of a suspense drama".
