= Ghutan =

Ghutan (lit. 'Suffocation' in Hindi) may refer to:

- Ghutan (film), a 2007 Indian horror film
- Ghutan (TV series), an Indian TV series first broadcast in 2007
