= Aakhri Cheekh =

Aakhri Cheekh आखरी चीख
- Directed by: Kiran Ramsay
- Produced by: Reshma Ramsay
- Starring: Vijay Arora; Anil Dhawan; Deepak Parashar; Poonam Dasgupta; Surendra Pal; Vijayendra Ghatge; Neelam Mehra
- Music by: Bappi Lahiri
- Production company: Ramsay Brothers
- Release date: 3 May 1991
- Country: India
- Language: Hindi

Aakhri Cheekh is a 1991 Bollywood horror film directed by Kiran Ramsay and produced by Reshma Ramsay, starring Vijay Arora, Vijayendra Ghatge and Anil Dhawan.

== Plot ==
An evil man kills young women after having romantic affairs with them. By knowing it, four friends get him arrested and electrocuted as the death sentence. But his soul returns and starts taking revenge on them and their families one by one.

== Cast ==
- Vijayendra Ghatge as Rahul Kumar
- Javed Khan as Jeet Khurana
- Anil Dhawan as Anand Pandit
- Sriprada as Mita
- Deepak Parashar as Samuel David
- Poonam Dasgupta as Jennifer David
- Surendra Pal as Roshan
- Neelam Mehra as Priya Kumar
- Sujit Kumar as Father Robert
- Kanwaljit Singh as Dr. Khanna
- Vijay Arora as Advocate Prakash
- Rajendra Nath as Detective Karamchand
- Kamal Kapoor as Pathri Baba
- Ashalata as Jeet's mother

== Soundtrack ==
Music: Bappi Lahiri, Lyrics: Anjaan

Song title	Singer(s)
"Duniya Pyaar Ki Duniya"	Mohammed Aziz, Alka Yagnik
