= Zee Horror Show =

Indian horror television series

- Also known as: Anhonee
- Genre: Horror; Supernatural; Psychological thriller
- Written by: M. Salim
- Screenplay by: Shyam Ramsay
- Story by: Shyam Ramsay
- Directed by: Tulsi Ramsay; Shyam Ramsay; Deepak Ramsay; Indranil Goswami
- Theme music composer: Uttam Singh; Ajit Singh
- Country of origin: India
- Original language: Hindi
- No. of seasons: 2
- No. of episodes: 364

Production
- Producers: Tulsi Ramsay; Shyam Ramsay; Ashok Surana
- Cinematography: Gangu Ramsay
- Editor: Altaf Dohadwala
- Running time: 22 minutes
- Production company: Ramsay Cine Vision Production

Original release
- Network: Zee TV
- Release: 9 August 1993 – August 1, 2001

The Zee Horror Show is a weekly Indian horror anthology television series, presented by Ramsay Brothers and it was aired on Zee TV from 1993 to 2001.

The first episode was titled "Dastak", featuring Pankaj Dheer, Shagufta Ali and Archana Puran Singh, and telecast on 9 August 1993. Initially it was a 24-episode deal with Subhash Chandra; the franchise ended up running for nine years.

== Episodes ==
=== The Zee Horror Show ===
Title	Year	No. of episodes	Cast
Dastak	1993	4	Pankaj Dheer, Archana Puran Singh, Shagufta Ali, Narendra Nath, Sudhir, Mac Mohan, Sameer Khakhar, Shammi Gandhi, Amarnath Mukherjee
Khauf	1993	3	Aasif Sheikh, Poonam Dasgupta, Navneet Nishan, Girija Shankar, Anil Dhawan, Mushtaq Khan, Sameer Khakhar, Rajeev Sharma
Taveez	1993	3	Vijay Arora, Prabha Sinha, Sajid Khan, Shravani Goswami, Bharat Kapoor, Ramesh Tiwari, Anirudh Agarwal, Anu Dhawan
Jeevan Mrityu	1993	4	Mayur Verma, Pallavi Joshi, Sulabha Deshpande, Tina Ghai, Sudhir, Dinesh Hingoo, Sunil Dhawan, Gulam Mohd., Shobha Pradhan
Dahshat	1993	6	Siraj Mustafa Khan, Resham Tipnis, Asha Irani, Raju Shrestha, Mayuri, Ramesh Tiwari, Anuraag, Javed, Bhushan Kumar, Sujit Kumar, Adi Irani
Saaya	1994	11	Balbinder Dhami, Prabha Sinha, Anurag, Antriksha, Praveen Hashmi, Tarakesh Chauhan, Sumeet Pathak, Shravani Goswami, Gajendra Chauhan, Sudhir, Surendra Pal, Usha Nadkarni, K. K. Raj, Brahmachari
Aafat	1994	5	Deepak Parashar, Neeraj Mehra, Jagurti, Rana Jung Bahadur, Mushtaq Khan, Firoz Irani, Mayuri, Himayat Ali, Goga Kapoor, Kishore Bhanushali
Karz	1994	4	Sulabha Deshpande, Anil Kochar, Roshan, Vijay Aidasani, Praveen Hashmi, Firoz Irani, Ramesh Tiwari, S. Madan, Ragesh Asthana, Prem Rishi, Anang Desai, Yogi Rajyogi
Madhumati	1994	6	Ashwin Kaushal, Afshan Khan, Jaya Mathur, Anuraag, Aruna Sangal, Arun Bali, Anil Nagrath, Babban, Goga Kapoor
Dhund (The Fog)	1994	6	Balbinder Dhami, Poonam Dasgupta, Mahavir Shah, Amarnath Mukherjee, Amrut Patel, Surendra Pal
Cheekh !	1994	5	Prithvi Vazir, Preeti Chaddha, Usha Nadkarni, Himayat Ali, Surender Dutt, Sudhir Pandey
Raaz	1994	6	Javed Khan, Prajakta Kulkarni, Arun Bali, Sumeet Pathak, Asha Sharma, Kavita Vaid, Savita Bajaj, Renuka Israni, Rajendra Gupta, Shravani Goswami, Ballee Grover
Khatra	1994	5	Rohan Kapoor, Neha Garewal, Rashmi Sharma, Jeet, Rajkumar Chandan, Subbiraj Kakkar
Raat	1994	7	Javed Khan, Sree Prada, Suneel Rege, Rasik Dave, Prem Rishi, Mac Mohan, Ramesh Tiwari, Mayuri, Kavita Ved, Ballee Grover, Ved Thapar
Darr	1995	5	Tarakesh Chauhan, Renuka Israni, Jaya Mathur, Suresh Chatwal, Sudhir, Bharti, Ramesh Tiwari
Tadap	1994	4	Prithvi Vazir, Shagufta Ali, Homi Wadia, Ami Trivedi, Ratna Shetty, Deep Dhillon, Subbiraj Kakkar, Santosh Kaushik
Aatma	1995	4	Gajendra Chauhan, Baby Sahibaan, Asha Sharma, Preeti Chaddha, Rana Jung Bahadur, Anuraag, Rajkumar Chandan
Haadsa	1995	2	Ragesh Asthana, Naina, Kaushal Kapoor, Sunayna, Santosh Kaushik, Salim Kumar, Raj Kishore
Khamoshi	1995	6	Resham Tipnis, Ragesh Asthana, Malay Chakraborty, Neha Sharad, Brijgopal, Sameer Khakhar, Dev Malhotra, Sudhir Dalvi, Vijay Aidasani, Neha Garewal, Arun Bali
Gehraai	1995	7	Siraj Mustafa Khan, Harsha Mehra, Raju Shrestha, Rupa Bede, Ashwin Kaushal, Sudhir, Raj Kishore, Balli Grover, Babloo Mukherjee, Shiva Rindani, Ramesh Tiwari
Chamatkar	1995	6	Javed Khan, Tina Ghai, Ragesh Asthana, Vilas Raj, Shamsuddin, Vijay Aidasani, Mayuri, Ballee Grover
Tehkhana	1995	5	Neeraj Mehra, Ved Thapar, Rubina Khan, Roshan, Mayuri, Sunil Dhawan, Santosh Kaushik, Suresh Chatwal, Babloo Mukherjee
Tantrik	1995	9	Ravi Sagar, Aarti, Asha Irani, Ramesh Tiwari, Annapoorna, Balee Grover, Sudhir, Ashwin Kaushal, Anirudh Agarwal
Gudiya	1995	7	Mahavir Shah, Prabha Sinha, Neelam Mehra, K. K. Raj, Fatima Sana Shaikh, Asha Sharma, Shreedhar Shetty, Suresh Chatwal, Sudhir
Andhera	1995	5	Rishabh Shukla, Ibtsam Tapia, Rasik Dave, Anil Kochar, Faqira, Sheerin, Ahsan Parvez, Javed Khan, Dinesh Kaushik
Siskiyan	1995	6	Rishabh Shukla, Harsha Mehra, Sudhir, Anuraag, Sameer Khakhar, G. P. Singh, Channa Ruparel, Chitra Kopikar, Ballee Grover
Kabrastan	1995	6	Ved Thapar, Sheela Sharma, Pankaj Kalra, Arun Mathur, Anuraag, Mahavir Shah, Ballee Grover
Chandalika	1996	7	Ajinkya Deo, Dimple Shah, Afshan Khan, Anant Jog, Anil Kochhar, A. R. Agnihotri, Goga Kapoor
Be-Naqab	1996	5	Prithvi Vazir, Amita Nangia, Urmila Bhatt, Asha Irani, Himayat Ali, Prasant, Kamal Malik, Anil Kochar
Darwaza	1995	4	Neelam Mehra, Anil Dhawan, Mukhtar Khan, Rubeena Khan, Vinod Tripathi, K. K. Raj, Ballee Grover
Aag	1996	5	Ashwin Kaushal, Neena Softa, Malay Chakravorti, Usha Nadkarni, Ramesh Tiwari, Liyaqat Bari, Vijay Aidasani
Jaal	1996	6	Javed Khan, Jaya Mathur, Gajendra Chauhan, Anuraag, Suresh Chatwal, Firoz Irani, Vinod Tripathi, Arun Mathur, Ballee Grover
Mukti		5	Prithvi Vazir, Nina Softa, Rasik Dave, Arun Mathur, Suresh Chatwal, Vinod Tripathi, Ballee Grover, Sudhir, Poonam Dasgupta
Haveli	1997	5	Imran Khan, Aarti, Rakhee Malhotra, Mukhtar Khan, Vilas Raj, Usha Nadkarni, Sunil Dhawan, Faqira, Shiva Rindani, Ramesh Tiwari, Vinod Tripathi
Chehre Pe Chehra	1997	2	Javed Khan, Prithvi Vazir, Amita Nangia, Ashwin Kaushal, Ragesh Asthana, Ramesh Tiwari, Shiva Rindani, Achyut Potdar, Vinod Tripathi, Ballee Grover
Anhonee	1997	4	Javed Khan, Nishigandha Wad, Sudhir, Ravi Patwardhan, Ballee Grover, Poonam Dasgupta
Khoj	1997	3	Dharmesh Vyas, Faqira, Sunil Dhawan, Vinod Tripathi, Kamal Sagar, Ali Khan, Subbiraj Kakkar
Sannata	1997	3	Balbinder Dhami, Prajakta Kulkarni, Kanchan Rawal, Suresh Chatwal, Himayat Ali, Arun Mathur, Ballee Grover
Aakhri Shikhar	1997	3	Arjun Chakraborty, Kushal Chakraborty, Nayantara Dutta, Sujan Mukherjee, Vaishali De, Subol Ghosh, Shishir Gupta, Jai Prakash Singh, Avdesh Jaiswal, Jayanti Bhattacharya, Chandan Sen, Nandini Chowdhury, Soma Chakraborty, Rajesh Sharma, Anurag Motha, Sudipto Ballav, Sorvoday Manchanda, Tota Roy Chowdhury, Chaitali Sinha, Ram Kishore Thakur
Aaina	1997	4	Neha Sharad, Kheyali Dastidar, Bharat Kaul, Manoj Vyas, Shakil Ansari, Sudipa Bose, Mantu Das, Karuna Srivastav, Sanjeev Tiwari, Subol Ghosh, Mithu Chakrabarty, Mrs. M. Vyas
Shart	1997	2	

=== Anhonee ===
Title	Year	No. of episodes	Cast
Jaal	1997	6	Nayantara Dutta, Rajesh Sharma
Mangalsutra	1997	5	Resham Tipnis, Sanjeev Seth
Ittefaq	8/1997	5	Ajinkya Deo, Varsha Usgaonkar, Raman Kapoor, Jaya Mathur, Arun Bali, Prem Rishi, Sulabha Deshpande, Goga Kapoor
Saazish	1997	4	Deepak Deulkar, Nishigandha Wad, Adi Irani, Prashant Jaiswal, Sagar Salunkhe
Doosra Aadmi	1997	2	Pankaj Dheer, Priyanka, Sunil Dhawan, Swati Verma, Vinod Tripathi, Deep Dhillon
Abhishaap (The Curse)	1998	5	Nawab Shah, Sangeeta Ghosh, Shiva Rindani, Sagar Salunke, Ashok Sharma, Santosh Kaushik, Rajeeta Kochhar, Nivedita Bhattacharya
Hospital	1/1998	2	Dharmesh Vyas, Sejal Shah, Asha Sharma, Kavita Ved, Chitra Kopikar, Prashant Jaiswal, Vinod Tripathi, Ramesh Tiwari, Sunil Dhawan, Fatima Sheikh
Shraap	1/1998	5	Javed Khan, Sheela Sharma, Amarnath Mukherjee, Tarakesh Chauhan, Kanchan Rawal, Jeet Atal, Vinod Tripathi, Ramesh Tiwari, Rajesh Vivek
Saamri	2/1998	5	Neena Softa, Achyut Potdar, Ashwin Kaushal, Faqir Nabi, Vinod Tripathi, Arun Mathur
Pyaas	3/1998	4	Sanjeev Seth, Resham Seth, Adi Irani, Liyaqat Ali, Pramod Kapoor, Anirudh Agarwal, Damini Kanwal
Musafir	1998	2	Malay Chakraborty, Usha Nadkarni, Mahesh Raj, Vijaya Aidasani, Rakhee Malhotra
Musafir	1998	3	Imran Khan, Afshan, Lalit Tiwari, Tarakesh Chauhan, Vicky Ahuja, Ashwin Kaushal, Subiraj
Deewar	1998	1	Ashwin Kaushal, Amita Nangia, Vinod Tripathi, Chitra Kopikar, Ballee Grover
Aatma	1998	5	Sudhir Mittoo, Neelam Sagar, Pankaj Berry, Shiva, Sumukhi Pendse, Ashwin Kaushal, Sunil Dhawan, Rana Jang Bahadur, Sudhir, Kalpana Iyer
Junoon	1998	3	Gajendra Chauhan, Nishigandha Wad, Anil Nagrath, Ballee Grover, Vinod Tripathi, Aroop Pal
Guest House	6/1998	4	Eva Grover, Rubeena Khan, Shruti Ulfat, Nawab Shah, Lalit Tiwari, Rajeeta Kochhar, Anant Jog, Bharat Kapoor, Raj Devgan
Achanak	7/1998	3	Raju Kher, Deep Shikha, Vijay Aidasani, Sudhir, Sunil Dhawan, Balee Grover, Meenakshi Saini, Faquira
Daayan	1998	4	Damini Kanwal, Prithvi Vazir, Ballee Grover, Goga Kapoor, Tej Sapru, Dinesh Kaushik
Woh Kaun Thi	2/1998	1	Dharmesh Vyas, Neelam Sagar, Ramesh Tiwari, Ballee Grover, Ashwin Kaushal, Sulbha Deshpande
Inteqam	4/1999	4	Dharmesh Vyas, Varsha Usgaonkar, Param Vir, Shalini Kapoor, Renuka Israni, Adi Irani, Afshan Khan, Prashant Jaiswal
Tijori	1999	3	Sanjeev Seth, Vijaya Aidasani, Channa Ruparel, S. M. Zaheer
Woh Phir Aayegi	12/5 to 9/6/1999	5	Harsh Chaya, Usha Bachani, Rajesh Khera, S. M. Zaheer, Madan Jain, Ballee Grover
Veerana	11/1999	5	Sooraj Thapar, Neelam Sagar, Sunil Dhawan, Rubeena Khan, Noopur Aliza, Harjit Walia, Ashwin Kaushal, Deepshikha, Ballee Grover
Junoon	1999	5	Niki Aneja Walia, Akshay Anand, Anju Mahendru, Raju Kher, Nawab Shah, Eva Grover
Darr	1999	2	Prithvi Vazir, Ashwin Kaushal, Ballee Grover, Vinod Tripathi, Ramesh Tiwari, Anil Nagrath, Sulbha Deshpande
Anguthi	1999	2	Rajan Haksar, Imran Khan, Suresh Chatwal, Rituraj Singh, Ramesh Tiwari, Achyut Potdar, Arun Mathur, S. Madan, Dimple Ghosh
Cheekh	1999	3	Prithvi Vazir, Fatima Sheikh, Baby Meenakshi Saini, Vilas Raj, Ashwin Kaushal, Prashant Jaiswal, Ballee Grover
Intezaar	1999	4	Pankaj Berry, Vinod Tripathi, Sonam Malhotra, Param Vir, Rajeev Verma, Anil Nagrath, Anuraag, Kalpana Iyer, Sumet Sehgal, Reena Kapoor
Kismat	1999	3	Madan Jain, Damini Kanwal, Vinod Tripathi, Ballee Grover, Prithvi, Sonam Malhotra
Vapsi		1	Mahavir Shah, Brij Gopal, Vinod Tripathi, Gajendra Chauhan
Khauff		5	Madan Jain, Rubeena Khan, Shraddha Sharma, Suresh Chatwal, Aryan Vaid, Avinash Sahijwani, Rita Bhaduri, S. Madan, Ramesh Tiwari, Achyut Potdar, Sudhir Dalvi
Amaanat		1	Resham Seth, Uma Khosla, Vinod Tripathi, Jaya Mathur
Post•Mortem		4	Suraj Thapar, Durga Jasraj, Himayat Ali, Ali Khan, Sahiba, Brij Gopal, Browney, Vijay Aidasani, Deep Dhillon
Cafe 18		2	Paramvir, Eva Grover, Sharmilee, Arun Bali, Nawab Shah
Kabar THE GRAVE		5	Javed Khan, Ramesh Tiwari, Imran Khan, Rajeeta Kochhar, Neelam Sagar, Subbi Raj
Tadap		3	Jeet Upendra, Rajeeta Kochhar, Prashant Jaiswal, Rubeena Khan, Renuka Israni, Ramesh Tiwari, Santosh Kaushik, Gopal Rai
Raaz		3	Pankaj Berry, Vilas Raj, Ashwin Kaushal, Gopal Rai
Murti		3	Rajeeta Kochhar, Ramesh Tiwari, Sheela Sharma, Santosh Kaushik, Rajan Haksar, Gajendra Chauhan, Vinod Tripathi, Neelam Sagar
Telephone	5/2000	3	Waqar, Usha Bachani, Mac Mohan, Ashok Sharma, Suresh Chatwal, Santosh Kaushik, Ballee Grover, Anirudh Agarwal, Surendra Pal
The Party	2000	1	Pankaj Berry, Jaya Mathur, Ramesh Tiwari, Dinesh Kaushik, Vaishnavi, Ballee Grover
The Invitation	2000	3	Imran Khan, Shalini Kapoor, Adi Irani, Poonam Das Gupta, Sudhir, Vijay Aidasani, Anirudh Agarwal, Rajeeta Kochhar, Ashwin Kaushal, Noopur Aliza
Shraap	2000	3	Javed Khan, Sanjeev Seth, Sonia Kapoor, Malay Chakraborty, Rubeena Khan, Arun Mathur, Rajeeta Kochhar
Raat	2000	2	Prithvi Vazir, Usha Bachani, Kaushal Kapoor, Vinod Tripathi, Gajendra Chauhan
Ghar	2001	4	Eva Grover, Rituraj Singh, Karan Trivedi
Haadsa	2001	3	Niki Aneja Walia, Shaukat Baig
The Fatal Love	2001	3	Rohit Roy, Deepshikha Nagpal

== Soundtrack ==
The opening theme was composed by Ajit Singh and Uttam Singh. The tune was earlier the background score for several movies of Ramsay Brothers with the first one being Purana Mandir (1984) which was rearranged.

== Broadcast ==
Zee Cinema regularly telecasted the episodes of 1993-94 in movie format. On 9 August 1997, Taveez was telecast. Rajesh Cable recorded them and Zee Cinema had several reruns of those episodes like Khauf and Taveez under the title Chills & Thrills till 2004.

Thriller Active Channel available only on Dish TV and Videocon D2H aired some episodes of Season 1 from 30 September 2018 to 20 October 2019.

The series aired on The Horror TV available only on Airtel Digital TV showing episodes of Season 1 from 10 May 2019 to 1 November 2019.

Zee TV decided to rerun this series during the first lockdown from 27 April 2020, but this lasted only for five days.

Starting on 16 August 2021, Shemaroo entertainment re-aired this series on some channels owned by it like Thriller Active, Tata Play Adbhut Kahaniyan and Rahasmay Kahaniyan in subscription basis. It ran successfully till year end.

== Reception ==
In July 1997, a petitioner in Punjab and Haryana high court argued that horror shows promoted superstitions which were affecting the youth. He requested that these shows should be aired only after midnight. Women and children were a significant part of its viewership base, so at the urging of Colgate, the show's sponsor, the show's name was changed to Anhonee, with the words "The Zee Horror Show" written below it. The name changed to simply Anhonee in September 1997.

Ashok Surana was made the co-producer of the show along with Ramsay brothers in November 1997. His episodes were directed by Indranil Goswami and would alternate with those made by Ramsay brothers. Some episodes were produced by Ashok Surana were Jaal, Aaina and Aakhri Shikar.

== See also ==
- List of Hindi horror shows
