= Tulsi Ramsay =

Indian film director (1944–2018)

- Born: 29 July 1944; Karachi, Sindh, British India
- Died: 13 December 2018 (aged 74); Mumbai, Maharashtra, India
- Occupation: Film director
- Father: F. U. Ramsay
- Relatives: Kumar Ramsay; Shyam Ramsay; Keshu Ramsay; Arjun Ramsay; Gangu Ramsay; Kiran Ramsay

Tulsi Ramsay (29 July 1944 – 13 December 2018) was an Indian film director. He was the son of F. U. Ramsay and was one of the famous Seven Ramsay Brothers. The other six are Kumar Ramsay, Shyam Ramsay, Keshu Ramsay, Arjun Ramsay, Gangu Ramsay and Kiran Ramsay. Tulsi Ramsay directed several movies in the Horror genre during the 80's and 90's. Movies such as Hotel, Purana Mandir, Tahkhana, Veerana, Bandh Darwaza have acquired a cult following. He has also directed the Zee Horror Show TV series in 1993. The memories of most of the episodes of this TV series are still afresh in the hearts of horror enthusiasts in India. He ran a production company, Tulsi Ramsay Production located at Andheri in Mumbai. Ramsay died on 14 December, 2018 in a city hospital in Mumbai after complaining of chest pains.

== Filmography ==
=== Director ===
- The Zee Horror Show (1993) TV series (unknown episodes)
- Mahakaal (1993)
- Police Mathu Dada / Inspector Dhanush (1991)
- Ajooba Kudrat Ka (1991)
- Bandh Darwaza (1990)
- Purani Haveli (1989)
- Veerana (1988)
- Tahkhana (1986)
- Telephone (1985)
- Saamri (1985)
- Purana Mandir (1984)
- Ghungroo Ki Awaaz (1981)
- Hotel (1981)
- Sannata (1981)
- Dahshat (1981)
- Saboot (1980)
- Guest House (1980)
- Aur Kaun? (1979)
- Darwaza (1978)
- Andhera (1975)
- Do Gaz Zameen Ke Neeche (1972) ... aka Two Yards Under the Ground (India: English title)
- Nakuli Shaan (1971)
- Penanggalan (1967) ... aka The Headless Terror (USA) [widely dismissed as a hoax]

=== Producer ===
- Aatma (2006)
- Bandh Darwaza (1990)
- Tahkhana (1986)
- 3D Saamri (1985)

=== Production Designer ===
- Bandh Darwaza (1990)
- Na-Insaafi (1989)
- Purana Mandir (1984)

=== Writer ===
- Inspector Dhanush (1991) (story) (Credited as Tulsi-Shyam)
