= Neighbours (2014 Indian film) =

- Theatrical poster
- Directed by: Shyam Ramsay
- Written by: Shyam Ramsay
- Produced by: Shyam Ramsay
- Starring: Arbaaz Ali Khan; Roushika Reikhi; Shakti Kapoor; Gavie Chahal; Rufy Khan
- Music by: Songs: Deepak Shah; Background Score: Surinder Sodhi
- Distributed by: Ramsay Entertainment
- Release date: 14 March 2014
- Running time: 124 minutes
- Country: India
- Language: Hindi

Neighbours is a 2014 Indian Hindi-language supernatural horror film directed by Shyam Ramsay and a remake of the 1985 American film Fright Night. The cast includes Arbaaz Ali Khan, Roushika Reikhi, Shakti Kapoor, Gavie Chahal and Rufy Khan. The film was released on 14 March 2014. Neighbours was the first vampire film by the director, and the first Ramsay film to be set in a city, Mumbai, but Neighbours did not have a big theatrical release. Ramsay stated to the media: “My new film Neighbours is about a seemingly normal neighbour who turns out to be a vampire. We’ve cast a super-model Roushika Reikhi as a sexy vampire.”

== Plot ==
Sanam is a horror buff; she has horror films and literature filling up her room, much to the annoyance of her family. Therefore she is shocked to find out that vampires (who are on a killing spree in the city) have made their abode opposite her house.

Nobody believes Sanam when she tells everyone that her neighbours are vampires. Her family, friends, and even her professors don't pay her any attention.

== Cast ==
- Arbaaz Ali Khan as Aka
- Roushika Reikhi as Sanam
- Shakti Kapoor
- Gavie Chahal as Inspector Vikrant
- Rufy Khan

== Box office ==
The film was poorly received, and was declared a box office disaster by Box Office India.
