= Mahakaal (1994 film) =

- Theatrical release poster
- Directed by: Shyam Ramsay; Tulsi Ramsay
- Written by: Y.V. Tyagi
- Produced by: Gangu Ramsay; Chander Ramsay
- Starring: Karan Shah; Archana Puran Singh; Reema Lagoo; Johnny Lever; Kulbhushan Kharbanda
- Cinematography: Gangu Ramsay
- Edited by: Vikas Daripkar; Shyam Gupte
- Music by: Anand–Milind
- Release date: 11 February 1994
- Running time: 131 minutes
- Country: India
- Language: Hindi
- Budget: ₹0.4 crore
- Box office: ₹1.88 crore

Mahakaal, also known as Mahakaal: The Monster, is a 1994 Indian Hindi-language horror film directed by Shyam Ramsay and Tulsi Ramsay, known as the Ramsay Brothers. The film borrows numerous elements from the 1984 American film A Nightmare on Elm Street and its sequels, including its antagonist, Shakaal—who, like Elm Street's Freddy Krueger, is a razor-gloved killer who can murder people through their dreams.

Blending elements of mysticism, black magic and slapstick comedy, Mahakaal is the second Bollywood film derived from A Nightmare on Elm Street, following 1989's Khooni Murda, which was produced by Mohan Bhakri. Mahakaal was also the last horror film produced by Shyam and Tulsi Ramsay. It was a moderate commercial success upon its theatrical release on 11 February 1994.

== Plot ==
A college student, Seema, has a nightmare that a horrible looking man wearing steel claw gloves and attacks her. She wakes up to find that she has real wounds on her arm. Later her friend Anita too has the same nightmare and finds real wounds on her arm.

Anita tells her parents about her nightmare. Her father, who is a policeman, refuses to believe it. Later, Seema is attacked again in her dream and she dies of the wounds. Her boyfriend is put in police lockup where he sees the horrible man who makes snakes appear by magic. The boyfriend dies of snake-bite. Later, Anita and her mother catch Anita's father taking out a metal clawed glove from his drawer, so he is forced to reveal the secret that an evil magician Shakaal had been kidnapping children and sacrificing them to increase his evil powers.

Seven years ago, Shakaal had killed Anita's sister too. Finally, Shakaal kidnaps Anita. As her father knows Shakaal's place, he arrives with Anita's boyfriend and they manage to kill him and save Anita.

== Cast ==
- Karan Shah as Prakash
- Archana Puran Singh as Anita
- Reema Lagoo as Anita's mother
- Johnny Lever as Canteen & Hotel Manager
- Kulbhushan Kharbanda as Anita's father
- Mahaveer Bhullar as Shakaal
- Dinesh Kaushik as Randheer
- Kunika as Seema
- Mayur Verma as Param
- Baby Swetha as Mohini (Anita's Sister)
- Sunil Dhawan as College Principal
- Asha Patel as Cabaret Dancer
- Narender Nath as Pujari

== Production ==
Production on Mahakaal began in 1988. The film was shelved before completion after a rival production released its own film derived from A Nightmare on Elm Street before the Ramsays had finished theirs. The competing film, Khooni Murda, was released in 1989. Mahakaal was eventually released theatrically in India on 11 February 1994.

== Soundtrack ==
No.	Title	Singer(s)	Length
1.	"Chal Chal Meri Jaan Chal Zara"	Udit Narayan, Sadhna Sargam, Sudesh Bhosle
2.	"Main Khush Naseeb"	Kumar Sanu, Anuradha Paudwal
3.	"Janejaan Bahon Mein Aaja"	Sapna Mukherjee

== Release and reception ==
=== Box office ===
Mahakaal was released in India on 11 February 1994. Made on a budget of approximately ₹40 lakh, the film earned ₹99.75 lakh net and ₹1.88 crore gross in India. Box Office India estimates its worldwide gross at approximately ₹1.89 crore and records approximately 2.43 million admissions, classifying its commercial performance as "Average". The film found more success in small cities, towns and villages as opposed to big cities. Its lackluster box office performance has been attributed to an oversaturation of horror films in the Indian market by the end of the 1980s, as well as to the economic and social reforms that had expanded the number of television channels available in India, allowing viewers the ability to watch such films as the American original, A Nightmare on Elm Street at home.

=== Critical response ===
In his book Mondo Macabro: Weird & Wonderful Cinema Around the World, British author Pete Tombs described Mahakaal as well made and atmospheric, while noting its close adherence to A Nightmare on Elm Street.

Reviewing the film for ScreenAnarchy in 2009, Rodney Perkins considered its atmosphere more successful than its narrative coherence, highlighting its use of coloured lighting and smoke effects while criticising its loose structure and lengthy running time. He also noted that the film directly reproduces scenes and musical cues from A Nightmare on Elm Street, while combining the horror material with musical numbers and the broad comedy of Johnny Lever.

In a 2011 retrospective, Noel Murray of The A.V. Club similarly emphasised the film's extensive borrowing from the Elm Street series, while noting alterations including its Indian setting, college-age characters, musical sequences and comic interludes.

== Home media ==
In 2009, Mondo Macabro released Mahakaal on DVD alongside the Ramsay brothers' Tahkhana (1986) as Bollywood Horror Collection, Volume 3. Both films were digitally remastered and presented in Hindi with English subtitles. The release also included an episode of the Mondo Macabro television series examining South Asian cinema.

Massacre Video later released the film on Blu-ray in 2023. The edition used a new 2K scan of the original 35 mm camera negative and presented the film uncut, with uncompressed Hindi audio and English subtitles. Its supplementary material included an interview with filmmaker Deepak Ramsay.
