= Ek Nanhi Munni Ladki Thi =

- Directed by: Vishram Bedekar
- Written by: Kumar Ramsay
- Produced by: F.U.Ramsay
- Starring: Prithviraj Kapoor; Mumtaz; Shatrughan Sinha; Helen; Laxmi Chhaya
- Cinematography: Arvind Ladd
- Edited by: Anant Apte
- Music by: Ganesh
- Release date: 8 April 1970
- Country: India
- Language: Hindi

Ek Nanhi Munni Ladki Thi is a 1970 Bollywood drama film directed by Vishram Bedekar. The film stars Prithviraj Kapoor, Mumtaz and Helen in lead roles. This movie is supposed to be the first or one of the first attempts of the Ramsay Brothers in the horror genre, notwithstanding the fact that consequently, the name Ramsay Brothers had become synonymous with horror movies in Indian cinema.

== Cast ==
- Shatrughan Sinha
- Mumtaz
- Laxmi Chhaya
- Nadira
- Helen
- Jayant
- Prithviraj Kapoor
- Mubarak
- Sajjan
- Bobby
- Surendra Kumar

== Soundtrack ==
Asad Bhopali wrote the songs.

Song	Singer
"Ae Nazneen, Ae Gulbadan"	Manna Dey
"Apne Rukhsar Zara"	Mohammed Rafi
"Ek Nanni Munni Ladki Thi"	Mohammed Rafi
"Kahan Gaya Mere Sanam"	Asha Bhosle
"Yeh Jalte Hue Lab"	Asha Bhosle
