= Vishnu Vijaya =

Vishnu Vijaya / Ashaant
- VCD cover of Vishnu Vijaya
- Directed by: Keshu Ramsay
- Screenplay by: V. R. Bhaskar
- Story by: Ananda Vardhan
- Produced by: Vishnuvardhan
- Starring: Vishnuvardhan; Akshay Kumar; Mamta Kulkarni; Ashwini Bhave; Pankaj Dheer
- Cinematography: Anil Sehgal
- Edited by: V. N. Maykar; Koushal Mishra; Prasad
- Music by: Songs: Jatin–Lalit; Background score: Raju Singh
- Production company: Vishnupriya Combines
- Distributed by: Vishnupriya Combines
- Release date: 26 November 1993
- Running time: 140 minutes
- Country: India
- Languages: Kannada; Hindi

Vishnu Vijaya is a 1993 Indian action film directed by Keshu Ramsay. The film stars Vishnuvardhan, Akshay Kumar, Mamta Kulkarni, Ashwini Bhave, Ashutosh Rana and Pankaj Dheer.

The film was simultaneously filmed in Hindi as Ashaant. This is the first and only Kannada film of Akshay Kumar.

== Plot ==
This is a story about the effort made by the whole Police Force of the country, especially two police officers, A.C.P. Vishnu, Bangalore Police (Vishnuvardhan) and A.C.P. Vijay Bombay Police (Akshay Kumar), to bring peace, i.e. Shanti to the country. They wage a war against a Mafia that deals in printing fake currency notes and has become a threat to the country's security. These Mafia dons Kaka (Jai Kalgutkar) and Rana (Punit) are operating from Bangalore. But when the pressure of Police Officer Vishnu mounts on them, they decide to shift their base to Bombay. As they enter Bombay, Rana is nabbed by ACP Vijay and arrested. Vijay starts his investigation to reach the roots of this Mafia through Rana, when orders come from the home ministry to shift Rana from Bombay custody to the Bangalore court for many previous serious crimes.

Vijay, along with his friend ACP Amit (Pankaj Dheer), joins him to re-arrest Rana. Vishnu, who is in charge of Rana's case gets them permission, on two conditions; that Vijay and Amit can't use their weapons and police uniforms. Vishnu's wife Anita (Ashwini Bhave) and Vijay are ex-lovers. Their relationship ended as Anita's father Ex-Chief Minister Niranjan Das refused to let his daughter marry an ordinary Police Officer. Also, to take revenge on Vijay, he got Vijay's Sister Ritu (Amit's Wife) killed. Vijay then misused his power as a Police Officer and forced Niranjas Das to resign as Chief Minister. Anita also took an oath that she would only marry a Police Officer and married Vishnu.

On the other hand, Rana splits away from Kaka and forms his own Mafia, which gradually becomes more powerful and ruthless. Vijay and Amit, along with Vishnu, form a team to capture Rana and now Kaka also. Sonali (Mamta Kulkarni) a dancer in Kaka's hotel, joins this team of three against the two mafia operating in the city.

Kaka manages to create a misunderstanding between Vijay and Vishnu to break their unity and divide their power. Vishnu starts suspecting an illegitimate relationship between his wife Anita and Vijay. The degree of suspicion rises, but Amit finally clears the misunderstanding between Vishnu and Vijay. They join each other with equal faith and then manage to take down both the Mafias. Rana and Kaka are destroyed, but at the cost of sacrificing their dear friend Amit.

== Cast ==
- Vishnuvardhan as Vishnu
- Akshay Kumar as Vijay Roy
- Mamta Kulkarni as Sonali
- Ashwini Bhave as Anu / Anita
- Pankaj Dheer as Amit
- Sharat Saxena as Chief Minister Niranjan Das
- Puneet Issar as Rana

== Soundtrack ==
Kannada Tracks
#	Song	Singer(s)	Length
1	"Nannannu Nee Seru Baa"	SPB, K. S. Chithra	6:12
2	"Raja Nanna Raja"	Chithra	5:25
3	"Entha Santhosha"	S. P. Balasubrahmanyam, Manjula Gururaj	4:20
4	"Kannalli Dhim Dhim"	S. P. Balasubrahmanyam	5:26
5	"Saavira Januma"	S. P. Balasubrahmanyam, Manjula Gururaj	5:11
6	"Naa Thalenu"	Manjula Gururaj	4:09

Hindi Tracks
#	Title	Singer(s)
1	"Dil Ki Ghadi Are Ghadi Ghadi"	Kumar Sanu, Kavita Krishnamurthy
2	"Tu Bhi Sharabi Main Bhi Sharabi"	Udit Narayan, Abhijeet
3	"Hum To Sanam Sadiyon Se" (not in the film)	Abhijeet, Kavita Krishnamurthy
4	"Deewane Tu Hai Jahan"	Kumar Sanu, Alka Yagnik
5	"Bheege Bheege Jo Sawan"	Kavita Krishnamurthy
6	"Jaani Jaani Jaani"	Chithra
