= Room: The Mystery =

- Film poster
- Directed by: Faisal Khan
- Written by: Kadir Sayyed
- Produced by: Anil Kabra; Dinesh Deora
- Starring: Eshu Gambhir; Ibra Khan; Roselyn Dsouza; Atif Jamil; Himir Gandhi; Rohit Juneja; Shashwita Sharma
- Cinematography: Sunil Prasad
- Edited by: Dharam Sony; Anil Ray
- Music by: Various Artists
- Production companies: Pen N Camera International; An India E-Commerce Ltd.
- Distributed by: Pen N Camera International; An India E-Commerce Ltd.
- Release date: 12 December 2014
- Running time: 88 minutes
- Country: India
- Language: Hindi

Room: The Mystery is a 2014 Indian thriller film directed by Faisal Khan and produced by Anil Kabra and Dinesh Deora under the Pen N Camera International and An India E-Commerce Ltd. banners starring Atif Jamil. The film was released on 12 December 2014.

== Plot ==
Room – The Mystery is a story about Rishi and his friends who meet with an accident grievously injuring a woman and a child, while driving under the influence of alcohol. The woman then returns as a ghost to take revenge from all those who were responsible for her and her children's death.

== Cast ==
- Eshu Gambhir
- Ibra Khan
- Roselyn Dsouza
- Atif Jamil(from IIT)
- Himir Gandhi
- Rohit Juneja
- Shashwita Sharma
- Saajan Ali Khokhar
