= Mera Shikar =

Mera Shikaar
- Directed by: Keshu Ramsay
- Written by: Keshu Ramsay; Iqbal Durrani; B. Lachman
- Produced by: B. Lachman
- Starring: Dimple Kapadia; Kabir Bedi
- Cinematography: S. M. Anwar
- Edited by: V. N. Mayekar
- Music by: Bappi Lahiri
- Release date: 9 September 1988
- Country: India
- Language: Hindi

Mera Shikaar is a 1988 Indian Hindi action film directed by Keshu Ramsay. The film stars Dimple Kapadia and Kabir Bedi in lead roles. It was written by Iqbal Durrani. Subhash Jha of The Indian Express called the film "extraordinarily adroit entertainer" "one of the most engaging action films", and wrote, "with daring defiance, the film snowballs ideas that challenge its common objective (elemental entertainment). It would be a pity if the film is lumped with the run-of-the-mill potboiler." He further wrote that "unlike Zakhmi Aurat it does not degenerate into sleazy sensationalism". Referring to the transformation of Bijli, he wrote, "The metamorphosis of the frisky Bijli into the ferocious fighter is achieved in the film with unusual restraint through smooth editing, crisp camerawork cuttingly ironic dialogues, and of course Dimple's trevails both physical and cerebral."

== Cast ==
- Dimple Kapadia as Bijli
- Kabir Bedi as Ravi
- Prem Chopra as Bhurelal
- Danny Denzongpa as Changeza
- Trilok Kapoor as Mukhiya
- Om Shivpuri as Gafoor
- Navin Nischol as Masterji (Special Appearance)

== Plot ==
The movie revolves around Bijli, a young girl living in Chandanpur village. Her father (Rameshwar) wanted a son, but despite being a girl, Bijli is very hardworking and courageous.

Chandanpur village is ruled by Bhurelal, a greedy and cruel landowner. He takes the help of a dreaded dacoit named Changeza for his work. They both terrorise and exploit villagers. Bijli’s family also faces injustice and atrocity. This turns her life upside down.

Later, she meets Ravi, who is an expert in martial arts and in self-defence techniques. He trains Bijli, and eventually, she turns into a strong and fearless fighter who stands up for her rights.

In the end, Bijli confronts Changeza and Bhurelal and frees the villagers from their oppression.

== Music ==
Song	Singer
"Nirbal Nahin Yeh Nari"	Mohammed Aziz
"Pyar Chahiye"	Bappi Lahiri
"Thoda Sa Pyar"	Asha Bhosle
"Chalo Prem Desh"	Asha Bhosle
"Humko Yaad Na Karna"	Aparna Mayekar
