= Ajooba Kudrat Ka =

- Poster
- Directed by: Shyam Ramsay; Tulsi Ramsay
- Written by: Salim Hyder
- Produced by: Shaikh Mohammed Shakeel
- Starring: Shagufta Ali; Hemant Birje; Manjeet Kullar; Deepak Parashar; Sonam
- Music by: Ajit Singh
- Release date: 30 November 1991
- Country: India
- Language: Hindi

Ajooba Kudrat Ka (also known as Wonder of Nature) is a 1991 Indian Hindi-language horror thriller film directed by Shyam Ramsay and Tulsi Ramsay. It features Deepak Parashar, Hemant Birje and Manjeet Kullar. It was the first Bollywood film with a yeti theme.

== Plot ==
The film centres on the platonic relationship between a young girl and a Yeti (a Himalayan monster).

== Cast ==
- Deepak Parashar as Vikram
- Hemant Birje as Majid
- Manjeet Kullar as Dimple
- Shagufta Ali as Shobha
- Mac Mohan as Rafiq
- Johnny Lever as Fakruddin
- Anil Dhawan as KK
- Goga Kapoor as Yyanprakash
- Beena Banerjee as Asha
- Sudhir as Jaichand
- Baby Shweta as Vaishali
- Huma Khan as Dhristi
- Randhir Singh as Jaywant

== Music ==
1. "Dali Gulaab Ki Hoon" – Kavita Krishnamurthy
2. "Diwana" – Amit Kumar, Arpita Saha
3. "Hilla Hilla" – Johnny Lever
4. "Yeti I Love You" – Sadhana Sargam
5. "Yeti We Love You" – Sadhana Sargam
6. "Yeti We Love You" (Sad) – Sadhana Sargam
7. "Zoom Zooma Zoom" – Kavita Krishnamurthy, Jolly Mukherjee
