= Khoj (1989 film) =

- Promotional Poster
- Directed by: Keshu Ramsay
- Produced by: Kiran Ramsay
- Starring: Rishi Kapoor; Naseeruddin Shah; Kimi Katkar; Danny Denzongpa; Satish Shah
- Music by: Bappi Lahiri
- Release date: 10 November 1989
- Country: India
- Language: Hindi

Khoj is a 1989 Indian Hindi-language thriller film directed by Keshu Ramsay. The film stars Rishi Kapoor, Naseeruddin Shah, Kimi Katkar. It is a remake of the 1963 Bengali film Sesh Anka, which itself was previously remade into Hindi as Dhuan in 1981. The film was released on 10 November 1989.

== Plot ==
Ravi Kapoor (Rishi Kapoor) and his wife Anita are holidaying in Kathmandu. One night, Anita disappears suddenly. Ravi goes searching her everywhere but in vain. He then files a police report about her missing status and Inspector Balveer Singh (Naseeruddin Shah) begins the search for her. The next day, Ravi gets a call from Father Anthony (Danny Denzongpa) saying that his missing wife is with him in the church, but when Ravi meets her, he claims that the woman is not his wife.

Inspector Balveer finds all the evidence is against Ravi, despite his attempts to prove otherwise. Who is this mysterious woman and why is she claiming to be Ravi's wife?

Ravi still maintains that the woman is not Anita, however one-by-one all evidence seems to suggest otherwise. Starting with wedding photos, to Bobby Singh and Dr Saxena identifying the new woman as Anita, to eventually Ravi's daughter also identifying her, Ravi is not able to prove that she's not his wife.

== Cast ==
- Rishi Kapoor as Ravi Kapoor
- Naseeruddin Shah as Inspector Balveer Singh
- Kimi Katkar as Sujata Singh / Anita Kapoor
- Danny Denzongpa as CBI Officer Sudhir Roy / Father Anthony
- Satish Shah as Constable Dobby Singh / Bobby Singh (Double Role)
- Om Shivpuri as Dr. Saxena
- Sudha Shivpuri as Sudha Rana
- Beena Banerjee as Gulabo Singh
- Prema Narayan as Dancer in song "Aaj Ki Biwi"
- Huma Khan as Dancer in song "Bolo Bolo"

== Soundtrack ==
Song	Singer
"Yaad Tumhari"	Nitin Mukesh
"Biwi Biwi Biwi"	Amit Kumar, Chandrani Mukherjee
"Aaj Ki Biwi"	Amit Kumar, Usha Mangeshkar
"Khoj Mein Kis Ki"	Sapna Mukherjee
"Sooni Sooni Raaten"	Alisha Chinai
