= Saamri =

1985 Indian film by Shyam and Tulsi Ramsay

3D Saamri
- Directed by: Shyam Ramsay; Tulsi Ramsay
- Written by: J.K. Ahuja
- Produced by: Tulsi Ramsay
- Starring: Rajan Sippy; Aarti Gupta; Puneet Issar; Asha Sachdev; Gulshan Grover
- Cinematography: Gangu Ramsay
- Edited by: C. Manick Rao
- Music by: Bappi Lahiri
- Release date: 1985
- Country: Indi
- Language: Hindi

Saamri is a 1985 Indian Hindi-language horror film released in 1985. It was produced and directed by Shyam and Tulsi Ramsay, with a story by J. K. Ahuja, dialogue by Mahendra Dehlvi and Safi Ur-Rahman, and a screenplay by Kumar Ramsay.

== Plot ==
Dharmesh Saxena, referred to as "Saamri", is a wealthy elderly man who is involved in dark magic. Aware that his health is fading fast, he arranges for his expansive estate to be left to his niece, Anju Trivedi. Dharmesh's stepbrother Takleefchand, however, has other plans, and he and a motley group of co-conspirators kill Dharmesh and inform authorities that it was a suicide. The next phase of their plan is to kill Anju, but before they can, they begin dying gruesomely. Saamri has risen from the grave to take his revenge.

== Cast ==
- Anirudh Agarwal as Dharmesh Saxena "Saamri"
- Rajan Sippy as Sandeep
- Aarti Gupta as Anju Trivedi
- Puneet Issar as Police Inspector Baldev
- Asha Sachdev as Maria
- Gulshan Grover as Khanna
- Jagdeep as Changez Khan
- Prem Chopra as Mama Taklifchand
- Jack Gaud as Bhishan
- Gajendra Chauhan
- Amarnath Mukherjee as Professor

== Soundtrack ==
The film had 5 songs which was composed by Bappi Lahiri and written by Farooq Qaiser & Kafeel Azar.

1. "Ladki Kaise" - Kishore Kumar
2. "Bacha Le" - Bappi Lahiri, Johnny Whisky, Anand Raaj
3. "Paani Mein Aag lagi" - Amit Kumar, S. Janaki
4. "Saamri Saamri" - Anup Jalota
5. 3D Saamri (Title Track) - Bappi Lahiri
