= Guest House (1980 film) =

- Directed by: Shyam Ramsay; Tulsi Ramsay
- Produced by: Ramsay Brothers
- Starring: Vijayendra Ghatge
- Music by: Bappi Lahiri
- Release date: 1980
- Language: Hindi

Guest House is a 1980 Indian Hindi-language horror film directed by Shyam Ramsay, Tulsi Ramsay and produced by the Ramsay Brothers. This film was released in 1980 in the banner of Ramsay Productions. The music of the movie was composed by Bappi Lahiri.

== Plot ==
Christopher, a psychic with ability to contact spirits, goes to a remote village for conducting a seance. He stays in a guest house at the village. Christopher has a valuable ring in his finger. The guest house's manager and co-worker murders him and cuts his hand off for the ring and buries the corpse. The dead hand revives with evil power to avenge.

== Cast ==
- Vijayendra Ghatge as Suraj
- Padmini Kapila as Sunita
- Prem Nath as Christopher
- Narendra Nath as John
- Rajendra Nath as Bawra
- Mac Mohan as Shaktiprasad Srivastav
- Pinchoo Kapoor as Mr. Mehra
- Sudhir as Inspector Vikram
- Sujit Kumar as Kalia
- Roopesh Kumar as Kantilal
- Prem Krishen as Prem
- Sudha Shivpuri as Mrs. Mehra
- Birbal
- Madhu Kapoor as Prema
- Rajkishore Rana
- Dev Kumar as Jaggu Dada
- Shruti Astha

== Soundtrack ==
All music by Bappi Lahiri and lyrics penned by Amit Khanna.

- "He Met Me In The Guest House" – Preeti Sagar
- "Is Nasheeli Raat Mein" – Amit Kumar and Sulakshana Pandit
- "Kuch Tum Kaho Kuch Hum Kahein" – Amit Kumar
