= Ghutan (film) =

- Directed by: Shyam Ramsay
- Written by: Shyam Ramsay
- Produced by: Shyam Ramsay
- Starring: Aryan Vaid; Tarun Arora; Hina Tasleem; Pooja Bharti; Amit Shanker
- Cinematography: Gangu Ramsay
- Edited by: Ashaque Makrani
- Music by: Vishwanath Dixit
- Release date: 2007
- Running time: 2 hours 7 minutes
- Country: India
- Language: Hindi

Ghutan (transl. Suffocation) is a 2007 Indian Hindi-language horror film directed by Shyam Ramsay.

== Plot ==
Ravi Kapoor and his friend Jaggu drive to a graveyard with Catherine's body. Catherine comes into consciousness when they dig the land, and Jaggi suggests burying her alive. Catherine begs Ravi to kill her before burying her and starts screaming that she does not want to die and be in the darkness. But Ravi and Jaggi forcefully drag and put her inside a coffin while Catherine helplessly watches them close it. They bury her alive, and she dies.

The flashback is then narrated by Ravi Kapoor, Managing Director of Catherine Exports, and Jaggu, his best friend and Export Executive. Both of them are womanizers, and Ravi falls for the beauty of Priya Malhotra and appoints her as secretary. Ravi married Catherine for her wealth; she loves him truly but soon realises he is not worthy. But she does not give hope or try to rekindle her relationship with Ravi.

Ravi tries to misbehave with Priya, and she angrily confronts him but continues to work due to her family circumstances. Catherine revokes her power of attorney given to Ravi. Ravi is furious that he will not be able to withdraw any more money from the bank. Jaggi comes to Catherine's house and tries to console her. Ravi witnesses the scene and misunderstands that she is having an affair with him. He confronts her, and both fight. Ravi hits Catherine, and she accidentally falls over the dining table and faints. They believe her to be dead and decide to bury her. Her maid Nancy witnesses the whole thing, and Ravi blackmails her, saying he will kill her if she tells the truth to anyone.

Catherine's ghost escapes from the grave and meets a church father, who used to console her when she was alive. She tells him the truth. He informs her that she should rest in peace and should not try to enter her body again, and if she does, she will become evil. But Catherine declines and enters her body, thereby becoming a living dead.

She haunts Ravi, and he tells the truth to Jaggi, but to his distrust, he does not believe him. Nancy, who saw Catherine, also lies to him that she did not see Catherine. Catherine's uncle returns from Goa in search of Catherine.

Without knowing anything about Ravi, Priya falls in love with him. Her mother tries to warn her that Ravi is trying to play with her life, but she is not ready to listen. Nancy warns Ravi about Catherine and confesses that she comes home every night and stares at his bedroom door for hours. Ravi decides to check what's going on and goes to her grave and starts digging it, but Jaggi stops him. A police officer finds them, and they lie to him, saying they stopped to urinate.

Catherine attacks Priya and haunts her. On the other hand, Catherine's uncle files a police complaint saying that his niece is missing. The police inspector grows suspicious and checks the graveyard where he met Ravi and Jaggi on the first day. He digs the grave only to find that the body is missing, but he finds a chain belonging to Catherine. Priya confronts Ravi, asking for an explanation, but he consoles her, saying it was just her imagination. Nancy asks her to meet Prof. Siddarth Nath Bhatacharya, who serves as a medium to communicate with the dead ones. He informs her that it was none other than Ravi who murdered Catherine. He warns her to stay away from Ravi.

Priya angrily confronts Ravi and accuses him of murdering Catherine. Jaggi overhears the conversation and tries to kill Priya. But Catherine comes in time and saves her by killing Jaggi. Ravi seeks the help of the Father. Priya asks Ravi to surrender himself to the police, and he agrees. Catherine confronts Father and angrily accuses him of helping Ravi. Father tries to relieve Catherine from her body only to be killed by her.

Ravi surrenders and confesses the truth to the police, but the inspector asks for evidence that Catherine is dead as they couldn't find her dead body. Ravi decides to make Nancy confess the truth as she is the only witness to Catherine's murder. Catherine attacks Nancy, and she also becomes evil. Nancy attacks Ravi aggressively and he kills her.

Ravi tries to run away with Priya, but Catherine confronts them on their way. He asks her what exactly she wants him to do. She replies that he needs to confess his sin where he buried her alive. She attacks him and buries herself and Ravi alive where she was buried.

== Cast ==
- Aryan Vaid as Praveen Kumar;
- Hina Tasleem as Catherine
- Pooja Bharti as Priya
- Tarun Arora as aggi
- Shahbaz Khan
- Agasthya Shanker as Father James
