= Dhund (2003 film) =

2003 Indian Hindi-language film

- International release poster
- Directed by: Shyam Ramsay
- Written by: Sajeev Kapoor (dialogues)
- Screenplay by: S. Khan
- Based on: I Know What You Did Last Summer
- Produced by: Yashovardhan Tyagi; Vinod Sharma
- Starring: Amar Upadhyay; Aditi Govitrikar; Apurva Agnihotri; Divya Palat; Irrfan Khan
- Cinematography: Gangu Ramsay
- Edited by: Mohammed Rafique
- Music by: Viju Shah
- Production company: Sukrit Pictures
- Release date: 21 February 2003
- Running time: 147 minutes
- Country: India
- Language: Hindi

Dhund (released internationally as The Fog) is a 2003 Indian Hindi-language horror film directed by Shyam Ramsay. The film stars Amar Upadhyay, Apurva Agnihotri, Aditi Govitrikar, and Irrfan Khan in lead roles. It was released on 21 February 2003 and bombed at the box office. The film is loosely inspired by the 1997 American slasher film I Know What You Did Last Summer.

== Plot ==
Simran lives with her uncle, Rajendra, in a wealthy Malhotra family. She falls in love with Sameer, a photographer. While she participates in a beauty contest, her collegemate Taniya Khurana becomes frustrated. Taniya's brother Ajit threatens her regularly. But Simran's best friend Kajal and Kajal's boyfriend Kunal support Simran. They assure her. Simran takes part in the contest and wins. Disheartened, Ajit attacks Simran and Kajal, but they accidentally kill him after a short fight. When their respective boyfriends return, they decide not to tell anyone about the horrific incident. But Vikram, close to the Malhotra family, tries to blackmail those four friends that he knows everything about Ajit's death. Police inspector Ashutosh Khanna suspects the gang of four, but he has no evidence against them.

== Cast ==
- Amar Upadhyay as Sameer
- Aditi Govitrikar as Simran Malhotra
- Apurva Agnihotri as Kunal
- Divya Palat as Kajal
- Irrfan Khan as Ajit Khurana
- Shweta Menon as Tanya Khurana
- Prem Chopra as Rajendra Malhotra
- Gulshan Grover as Inspector Ashutosh Khanna
- Mukesh Tiwari as Vikram
- Tom Alter as Uncle Tom
- Pappu Polyester

== Soundtrack ==
All tracks were composed by Viju Shah and lyrics penned by Ibrahim Ashq, Chandrashekhar Rajit and Rakesh Mishra.

#	Title	Singer(s)	Length
1	"Dilbar Mera"	Udit Narayan, Sunidhi Chauhan	5:17
2	"Samjhona"	Abhijeet, Madhushree	5:32
3	"Aas Paas" (Female)	Sunidhi Chauhan	7:39
4	"Kitna Intezar"	Alka Yagnik	5:07
5	"Samjha Nahi"	Poonam Bhatia	5:31
6	"Mehki Mehki"	Sonu Nigam, Alka Yagnik	6:23
7	"Main Albeli Main Matwali"	Sunidhi Chauhan	5:17
8	"Aas Paas" (Male)	Shaan	7:39

== Reception ==
Taran Adarsh from Bollywood Hungama gave the film one star out of five, comparing it unfavorably to the previous Ramsay horror films, and criticizing the music as well as the editing.

== See also ==
- Kucch To Hai, another 2003 Indian Hindi-language film inspired by I Know What You Did Last Summer.
