= Purani Haveli (film) =

1989 Indian Hindi-language horror film

- Theatrical release poster
- Directed by: Shyam Ramsay; Tulsi Ramsay
- Written by: J. K. Ahuja; Arjun Ramsay
- Produced by: Gangu Ramsay
- Starring: Deepak Parashar; Amita Nangia; Neelam Mehra; Vijay Arora; Tej Sapru; Satish Shah; Manik Irani; Shehzad Khan
- Music by: Ajit Singh
- Release date: 14 April 1989
- Country: India
- Language: Hindi
- Budget: ₹40 Lakh
- Box office: ₹1.80 Crore in India

Purani Haveli (transl. The Old Mansion) is a 1989 Indian Hindi-language horror film presented by Ramsay brothers. The soundtrack of the film was composed by Ajit Singh.

== Plot ==
The film opens with a young couple Raja and Rita driving through a dense forest at night. Tired and sleepy, they decide to stop for the night, and find a haveli (mansion) nearby. They fall asleep in the outskirts of the mansion. Around midnight, the husband suddenly hears a terrifying roar and gets up to investigate. Then a horrible monster attacks him. His wife wakes up hearing his screams. She tries to rescue him but only gets his severed arm. Then the wife too is killed by the monster. An old man Narendra appears on the scene, a bit late but eventually traps the monster in an underground cage by scaring him with a crucifix. Then he attaches the crucifix to the latch to keep him from escaping.

The story then shifts to thakur Kumar, an industrialist who lives with his wife Seema and niece Anita in Mumbai. Since her parents' death, Anita has been living with her uncle who is also the legal custodian of her father's estate. Seema wants Anita to marry her younger brother Vikram so that they can milk out the estate but Anita does not approve of Vikram and is in love with a photographer named Sunil.

Mr.Rana, a royal family scion, meets Kumar in Mumbai and shows him pictures of an old Haveli in the Murud area. Liking the photos very much, Kumar says he shall buy it. Mr. Rana says he wishes to sell off the Haveli as he is childless and bereft of any heirs. Kumar also mentions he and Seema are a childless couple. Just then Anita enters and Kumar introduces his niece to Mr. Rana saying they are buying a haveli for her. Anita is asked to sign cheques for the transaction. She asks about the amount to be filled but Kumar diverts her very lovingly saying he'll write out the figure after finalizing the deal. Mr. Rana describes the serene natural beauty of the surrounding beach, Rocky promenades and a big forest around the haveli. Seema refuses the offer of visiting the haveli when Kumar asks her, saying Anita would be left alone in their City manor. Mr. Rana says he will ask his servant to clean the mansion before their arrival. When the servant Shankar enters the haveli for cleaning, he feels the spooky surroundings and hears a loud roar. When he tries to run away from there, the evil forces controlled by the underground monster kill him brutally. Kumar visits the mansion with Mr. Rana to buy the building. Both of them reach there past midnight. Mr. Rana calls out to his servant when they see the broom and bucket lying on the floor. He quips that the rascal is plagued by alcohol and decides to take him in hand. Kumar assures Mr. Rana he shall have the mansion cleaned. Kumar is admiring the haveli's beauty and says he will turn it into a beautiful museum. Just then Mr. Rana is lifted in the air by the iron statue and strangled to death. Kumar screams fearfully and runs out of the mansion. He collides with the eerie dead body of Shankar on his way out and throwing it off himself, runs towards his car. Kumar finds the dead body of Mr. Rana in his car. Crying out of extreme fear he starts running and enters the graveyard behind the mansion. But fire blasts corner him after he manages to escape the innermost ring of fire after which the monster's spirit drags him underground.

Meanwhile, Anita and Sunil are attacked by goons hired by Seema and Vikram. Seema calls Sunil to their mansion and insults him. As Anita is threatened by Vikram with killing Sunil if she denies marrying him, she can do nothing but moan and cry fearfully. That evening, Sunil and Anita meet each other at a common friend's birthday celebration according to their plan. Sunil sings about his lovely memories with Anita and they both reminisce their beautiful days. Anita is thrown on her bed back at home and Vikram angrily tugs her hair when she refuses to go to the haveli the next day. Shobha and Anand are shocked at Vikram's brutality and coax Anita into visiting the mansion with their college friends as Sunil would meet them there the next day. Later Anita, Vikram and a large group of some twenty-three friends arrive at the mansion. Sunil too reaches there the very next morning and thrashes Vikram for attacking Anita in the woods. One of Vikram's friends Michael is killed by the iron statue near the first floor railing.

Seema and Vikram become increasingly frustrated; Anita is about to come of age and reclaim her estate, while Vikram remains unsuccessful at wooing her. Seema hatches a plot and lures Sunil into the tehkhana (dungeon) where Vikram is waiting for both of them and attacks Sunil from behind. Sunil becomes unconscious and then they lock up the dungeon after leaving Sunil there thinking that he will eventually die and a lonely Anita may agree to marrying Vikram.

Sunil recovers in the dungeon and wanders around till he hears the monster roar in his cage. He almost opens the door of the cage by loosening the chains when an old man suddenly appears and stops him from doing so. Sunil asks the old man about the entity under the door. Narender promises to tell the truth after they go outside. He leads Sunil out of the dungeon and tells him the tragic story of his life. Twenty years ago he had arrived there from the city since his wife had gone into labour pains and it was necessary for her to deliver the baby and hence he ended up at the mansion for help. However he was repeatedly warned by a nun to go away and not let the delivery happen there because according to her, there was something inhuman and unholy lurking within the mansion and if the baby was born there, it would eventually lead to the birth of Evil. Owing to the adverse condition of his wife, the man did not pay heed to the nun and his wife gave birth to their baby. However he was shocked when he realised that his wife gave birth to the devil and she died herself in the process and the nun was right. The grief-stricken man then locked the monster in the cage with the help of the nun and spent the past 20 years in the same mansion so as to prevent the monster from hurting anyone.

Vikram goes back to the dungeon to check for himself that Sunil is dead. He hears the monster and unknowingly releases him getting himself killed. The monster, now free, goes on a violent rampage, killing people everywhere. Everybody vacates the mansion at once fleeing by bus. Seema unwisely stays behind, tries to flee from another route and she gets caught, raped and killed by the monster.

The monster makes his way to the bus that has broken down by a church and kills two girls and the old man as well. The monster enters the church and is tormented by the Almighty. He is finally impaled by a cross and his body set ablaze, ending his reign of terror once and for all. The film ends with Sunil and Anita lighting candles at the church and starting a new life together.

== Cast ==
- Deepak Parashar as Sunil
- Amita Nangia as Anita
- Satish Shah as Mangu and Kala Gangu
- Neelam Mehra as Seema Kumar
- Vijay Arora as Kumar
- Anil Dhawan as Raja (cameo)
- Priti Sapru as Rita (cameo)
- Tej Sapru as Vikram
- Pinchoo Kapoor as Mr. Rana
- Narendra Nath as the old man
- Manik Irani as the Monster
- Bhushan Tiwari as Dhambar Singh
- Geetha Singh
- Leela Mishra as Old woman in village
- Raj Kishore as Sher Khan
- Shobha as Shobha
- A.K Agnihotri as Jyoti
- Shehnaz Kudia as Priya
- Sunil Dhawan as Shanker
- Chhote Ustad as Chhote Dada
- Tina Ghai as Bhijli
- Sadhana Khote
- Sunny Musi as Cleaner

== Music ==
1. "Kaise Main Bhulaoon" - Anuradha Paudwal
2. "Sangmarmar Sa Tha" - Suresh Wadkar
3. "Aata Hai Mujhko Yaad" - Suresh Wadkar

== See also ==
Murud-Janjira – Island fort in Maharashtra, India
