= Tahkhana =

1986 Indian Hindi-language horror film

- Theatrical release poster
- Directed by: Tulsi Ramsay; Shyam Ramsay
- Written by: Kafeel Azar - Yogesh (dialogues)
- Screenplay by: Arjun Ramsay
- Story by: J. K. Ahuja
- Produced by: Gangu Ramsay
- Starring: Hemant Birje; Puneet Issar; Preeti Sapru; Aarti Gupta; Trilok Kapoor
- Cinematography: Gangu Ramsay
- Edited by: Arjun Ramsay; Venkatesh Naik
- Music by: Ajit Singh
- Production company: Ramsays International
- Release date: 12 December 1986
- Country: India
- Language: Hindi

Tahkhana (transl. Dungeon), also known as Tahkhana: The Dungeon, is a 1986 Indian Hindi-language horror film directed by Shyam Ramsay and Tulsi Ramsay. Its plot follows two sisters separated at birth and the search for a hidden treasure, which is guarded in a dungeon by a bloodthirsty monster.

Tahkhana features music composed by Ajit Singh and songs sung by Asha Bhosle, Amit Kumar, Anuradha Paudwal and Sushma Shreshtha. It stars Hemant Birje, Aarti Gupta and Kamran Rizvi in the lead roles, supported by Puneet Issar, Imtiaz Khan, Priti Sapru, Trilok Kapoor, Huma Khan, Rajindernath and Shamsuddin among others.

== Plot ==
A dying Thakur Surjeet Singh bequeaths his entire estate to one of his sons, Raghuvir, disowning the other, Dhurjan, the family's black sheep, who also indulges in black magic. The latter swears to use magical powers to usurp the estate, and arranges the abduction of Raghuvir's daughters, Sapna and Aarti. Mangal and his men manage to apprehend Dhurjan, imprison him in a dungeon, and rescue Aarti. They are unable to locate Sapna, and Raghuvir is killed. Before dying, he informs Mangal that Sapna has one of the two pieces of a locket around her neck, while the other is on Aarti's, and when joined together will reveal the location of a treasure buried in a dungeon.

20 years later, Aarti and her boyfriend, Vijay, along with several others, attempt to unearth this treasure - not realising that they not only face betrayal from one of their own, but will also release and fall prey to an ageless and indestructible evil entity.

== Cast ==
- Hemant Birje as Heera
- Kamran Rizvi as Vijay
- Aarti Gupta as Aarti
- Preeti Sapru as Panna
- Trilok Kapoor as Raghuveer Singh
- Narendra Nath as Dhurjan
- Puneet Issar as Anand
- Imtiaz Khan as Shakaal
- Rajendra Nath as cook Zabardast
- Huma Khan as Reena
- Shamshuddin as Demon
- Sheetal as Sapna
- Rana Jung Bahadur as Rana

== Music ==
1. "Nazro Se Aaj Nazre Aur Dil Se Dil Milaye" - Sushma Sharestha, Anuradha Paudwal
2. "Khuli Sadak Par: - Amit Kumar, Dilraj Kaur
3. "Mai Hoon Pagal" - Asha Bhosle

== Home media ==
Tahkhana was released on DVD by Mondo Macabro as a double feature with the 1993 film Mahakaal (also directed by the Ramsay brothers), as the Bollywood Horror Collection Vol. 3. In 2023, Mondo Macabro released Tahkhana on Blu-ray as part of the Bollywood Horror Collection boxed set, which also includes the Ramsay brothers-directed films Aatma (2006), Bandh Darwaza (1990), Purani Haveli, Purana Mandir (1984), and Veerana (1988).

== See also ==
- List of Hindi films of 1986
