= Shaitani Ilaaka =

Shaitani Ilaaka शैतानी इलाका
- Directed by: Kiran Ramsay
- Written by: J. K. Ahuja
- Produced by: Reshma Ramsay
- Starring: Deepak Parashar; Neelam Mehra; Asha Lata; Surendra Pal
- Music by: Bappi Lahiri
- Release date: 13 April 1990
- Languages: Hindi; Urdu

Shaitani Ilaaka (Satan's Domain) is a 1990 Hindi horror film directed by Kiran Ramsay and presented by the Ramsay brothers. This movie was released on 13 April 1990.

== Plot ==
A grotesque brougham stops in a dark forest, and its cowled driver, Lalbai the sorceress, beckons to the bewitched passenger, a newlywed bride. Lalbai leads the bride to the Shaitani Ilaaka (devil's domain), where she is roused from her spell. The bride is sacrificed, screaming and kicking, at the altar of her aka Shaitan, an ancient and fearsome demon. Years ago, he roamed free and indiscriminately terrorized the local townspeople. But he was ultimately defeated, reduced to a formless soul, and held, by a magic charm, to remain imprisoned forever within the Shaitani Ilaaka. Lalbai brings him a fresh bride every Amavasya night. Shaitan consumes the blood of this bride and grows stronger with each offering, until he can break the charm, restore all his evil powers, and ravage the world again.

A few years later, Anju grows up into a beautiful young girl and is in the final year of her university. Roma notices her girl in love with a decent guy, Deepak. He is the only son of an industrialist and is a well-cultured young man. Deepak gets to know of Anju's problem and contacts a tantrik through his parents. The tantrik is none other than Yogi Baba, Dr. Yograj's guru from Tibet. He visits the thakurs palace and instantly spots the root of the problem. He asks Deepak to remove Anju from there and take her to the famous Pavankhind mandir beyond a mountainous region in the city. He also insists that they leave during the bramhakaal, during which all evil beings are powerless. It lasts for 9 minutes at the break of dawn. All friends come together, hire a bus, and help Anju to wear the bramhakaal taaveez, which tantrik baba himself has purified with the most powerful prayers. Baba warns Anju that she should not remove the taaveez from her neck under any circumstances. Roma leads the kids outside. But Shalaka arrives just then and is outraged at Anju's removal. She steps way out of line and demands to know Anju's whereabouts. Roma refuses and puts her in her place, whereupon Shalaka transforms into a hideous witch, Lalbai, and reveals she has served Shaitan for ages, and when Thakur's ancestors used various magic incantations to defeat Shaitan, she infiltrated Thakur's household as a governess. She hopes to use Anju, the living descendant of Shaitan's enemies, as the final sacrifice to liberate Shaitan. Roma is shocked to find her maid in such a ferocious form and shoots her with a gun. But Lalbai, who is already a possessing evil spirit, pounces on Thakurain and murders her brutally.

Deepak and Anju are just crossing the backyard when Lalbai again comes there and tries to stop them. She tells them her real identity and attacks Anju, who falls in the swimming pool. Deepak tries to free her and gets wounded. Just then Baba arrives there and imprisons Lalbai, helping them to escape. Deepak and his friends successfully move Anju to a safe haven away from the city. They take the opportunity for some rest and relaxation. But in the old café, local ruffians find the girls at a table and start harassing them. A guy then reaches there and pounds the goons along with Deepak and Abdul, making them flee. He introduces himself as Kamal and befriends the whole group. Reaching the old fortress, they light the diya there, and Anju feels a strange peace surrounding her. She gains her happiness back for some time. Baba asks Deepak and Anju to get married there, as Lalbai won't be able to harm Anju after they consummate their pious union. Baba tracks Lalbai to the Shaitani Ilaaka. She now transforms herself into a wild eagle to protect her remaining powers. He uses his spiritual powers to summon her. When he discovers her intentions with Anju, he swiftly realizes Deepak and Anju must marry and consummate their matrimony as quickly as possible. Deepak and Anju are deeply in love and would marry anyway; they hasten the event and obtain a marriage license with Baba and others as witnesses. But while Deepak's sister is alone in the mandir preparing the flower baskets, the local goons reach there and try to molest her. Just then, the boys reach there and send them packing after breaking their bones. But while they reach the mandir and camp there, many untoward events happen, and many of their friends are ruthlessly killed by the Shaitaan. It happens as mostly the boys and girls venture into his lair in the dark, quite unwittingly losing their way. Once the devil even kidnaps Anju on her wedding night as she is bathing, and Lalbai wounds her with a metal pole. Shaitaan gets some of Anju's blood. As Deepak and friends reach there and rescue Anju, they realise that for now, thanks to Lalbai, Shaitaan has become strong enough to be able to leave his lair for a short time. Shaitaan even tracks them down to the stone fortress and attacks the girls there, but is unable to harm them as Baba again saves them in the nick of time.

Kanwaljit, whose only sister also became one of Lalbai's sacrifice victims, helps them in all ways but is later killed by Lalbai. Even when Baba goes to fight with Lalbai, she weakens his powers by harming his body with poison, and he succumbs to the attack. Due to the chaos in the village, the townsfolk and few eve teasers realise that the girl who got married in the mandir must be offered to the devil in order to quieten him and stop all the carnage. The final confrontation occurs near the village square. People surround the mandir, and after taking Anju hostage, tie her to a pillar to be used as bait for Shaitan. As the growling Shaitan gleefully steps up to exact his revenge, Deepak breaks free and attacks Shaitan. Shaitan fends him off with a powerful blow that pitches Deepak away. Deepak snatches a trishul (holy trident of Kali), which he finds at the altar. He discovers it repels Shaitan and ultimately drives it into Shaitan. The powers of Kali, channeled through the trishul, destroy Shaitan and bury him deep into the ground forever. The entire village is relieved by the devil's destruction and is blessed with Matarani's power forever.

== Cast ==
- Neelam Mehra as Lalbai / Shalaka
- Deepak Parashar as Deepak
- Surendra Pal as Tantrik Baba
- Ranjeet as Ranjeet
- Asha Lata as Anju's mother, Roma
- Satish Shah as Funtoosh
- Kanwaljit Singh as Amar
- Sri Pradha as Anjali "Anju"
- Shamshuddin as Shaithan
- Shehnaz Kudia as Nisha
- Sunil Dhawan as Anju's father, Thakur

== Music ==
1. "Aaj Kahin Door Na Ja" - Shobha Joshi, Udit Narayan
2. "Mera Haule Haule" - Mohammed Aziz, Anupama Deshpande
3. "Dooba Dooba" - Sudesh Bhosle, Udit Narayan, Alka Yagnik
4. "Tanna Na" - Bappi Lahiri
