= Do Gaz Zameen Ke Neeche =

- Poster
- Directed by: Tulsi Ramsay; Shyam Ramsay
- Based on: Lo Spettro (1963)
- Produced by: F.U. Ramsay
- Starring: Surendra Kumar
- Cinematography: Gangu Ramsay & Keshu Ramsay
- Edited by: Bal Korde
- Music by: Sapan Jagnmohan
- Release date: 30 December 1972
- Running time: 127 minutes
- Country: India
- Language: Hindi

Do Gaz Zameen Ke Neeche (transl. Two Yards Under the Ground) is a 1972 Hindi horror film directed by Tulsi Ramsay and Shyam Ramsay. This film was released on 30 December 1972 under the banner of Ramsay Films.

== Plot ==
Rajvansh, a rich widower and young scientist rescues a woman named Anjili and marries her. She forces her husband to fulfill her maternal uncle's demands for money all the time. Unwillingly, he consents. He soon realizes that his marriage is a failure because his wife and her uncle try to extort money from him all the time.

One day, he rescues a woman named Meena and while she is unconscious, he gets her to his home. He nurses her to good health with the help of his two faithful servants. Meena starts respecting and idolizing her master, but faces the wrath of Anjili. Anjili constantly taunts Meena and Rajvansh.

Frustrated by all this, Rajvansh keeps working in his laboratory which is set up at his home. One day while working some drops of chemical spill in his milk and he unknowingly drinks it. He becomes very ill. Anjili is least concerned. Rajvansh loses his ability to walk. Meena nurses him and constantly prays to God to make him well soon. Rajvansh's friend and family doctor advises him to get admitted to the hospital for better treatment, for which Anjili flatly refuses stating he will never recover in the hospital and she will search for a better doctor for him.

In the meantime, Anjili meets her old lover Anand with the help of her uncle and convinces him to stay at her home as a doctor and pretend to treat Rajvansh. She romances Anand behind Rajvansh's back. One day, Rajvansh catches them red-handed. Anjili compels Anand to kill Rajvansh for his property and they put his corpse in a big iron box and bury him in the graveyard with the help of Joseph (gravedigger).

Soon, they realize the key to the safe which contains much cash and money is missing. The search proves futile when they soon realize the key is in the coat of Rajvansh, who is dead and buried. Soon Rajvansh returns as a zombie, to avenge his death. Scientist Rajvansh makes a plot to kill his wife, her boyfriend and maternal uncle who had betrayed him for money.

== Cast ==
- Satyen Kappu as Anjili's uncle
- Dhumal as Servant Ramdas
- Surender Kumar as Rajvansh
- Pooja as Meena
- Imtiaz Khan as Anand
- Shobhna as Anjili
- Smita as Servant Chanchal
- Mayank
- Habib
- Helen as Dancer

== Soundtrack ==
Music composed by Sapan - Jagnmohan and all lyrics written by Naqsh Lyallpuri.

| No. | Title | Lyrics | Singer(s) | Length |
|---|---|---|---|---|
| 1. | "Ek Panchhi Ban Ki Main" | Naqsh Lyallpuri | Vani Jairam |
| 2. | "Pee Ke Aaye Gharwa Bedardi" | Naqsh Lyallpuri | Asha Bhosle |
| 3. | "Mai Hu Teri Jogniya Shyam" | Naqsh Lyallpuri | Vani Jairam |
