= Andhera =

1975 film

- Movie poster
- Directed by: Tulsi Ramsay; Shyam Ramsay
- Written by: Kumar Ramsay
- Produced by: F.U. Ramsay
- Starring: Sameer Khan
- Cinematography: Gangu Ramsay; Keshu Ramsay
- Edited by: Bal Korde
- Music by: Sonik-Omi
- Production company: Ramsay Films
- Release date: 8 April 1975
- Running time: 118 minutes
- Country: India
- Language: Hindi

Andhera (The Darkness) is a 1975 Indian horror film directed by Tulsi and Shyam Ramsay.

== Cast ==
- Sameer Khan as Deepak
- Rajesh
- Helen
- Tun Tun
- Sandesh Kohli
- Major Anand
- Ashoo
- Bhagwan
- Krishan Dhawan
- Dulari
- Vani Ganapathy
- Hiralal
- Satyendra Kapoor
- Seema Kapoor
- Imtiaz Khan as Ranjeet
- Mukri
- Murad
- Arvind Pandya
- Shekhar Purohit

== Songs ==
1. "Rang Doonga Sabko Main (Happy)" - Kishore Kumar
2. "Husn Aur Shaarab Ka Jo Rishta Hai" - Asha Bhosle
3. "Rang Doonga Sabko Main (Sad)" - Kishore Kumar
4. "Kuch To Samjho Aati Hai Kisliye Jawani" - Asha Bhosle
