= Shyam Ramsay =

Indian film director (1952–2019)

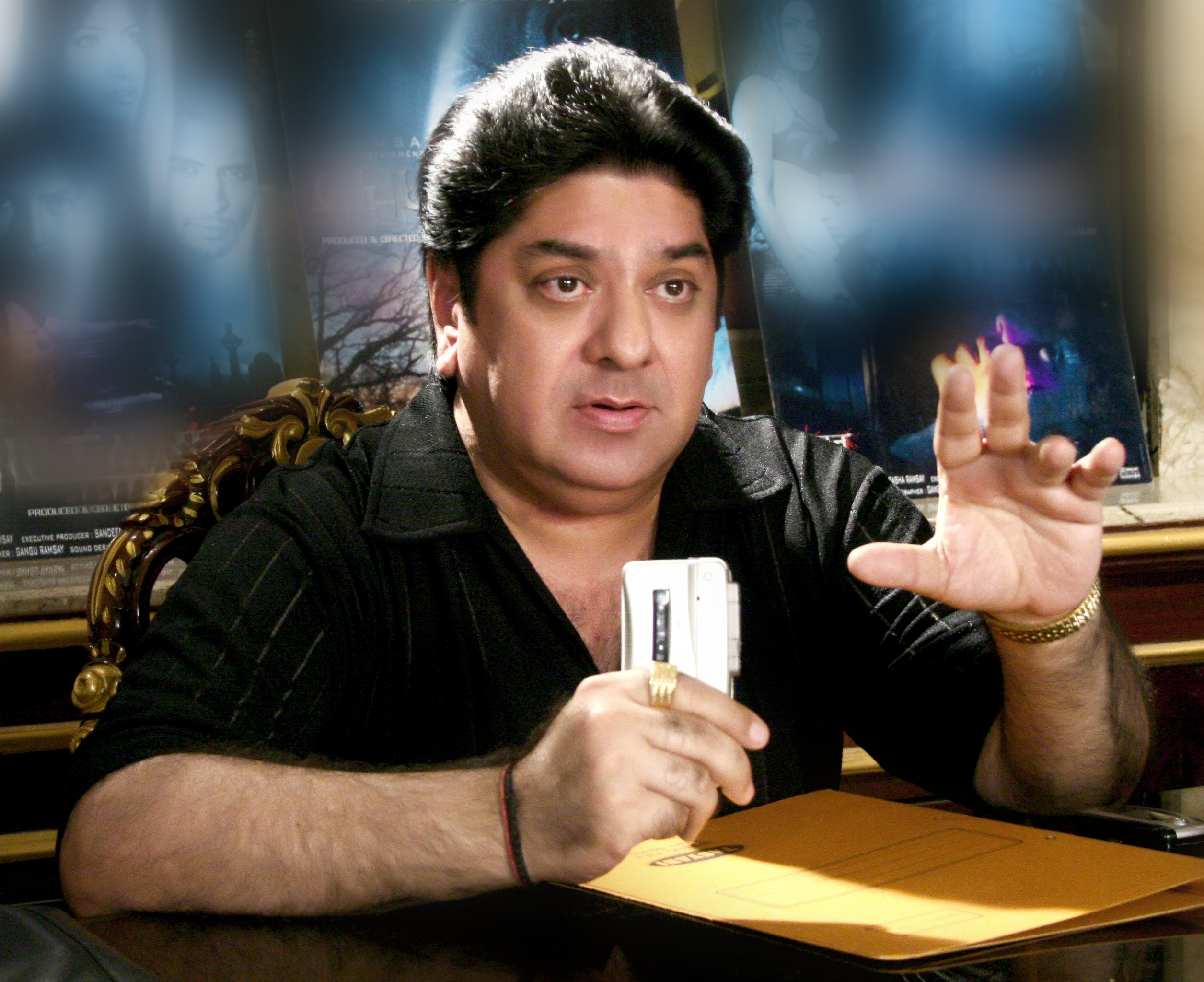
- Ramsay in February 2007
- Born: 17 May 1952; Bombay, Bombay State, India
- Died: 18 September 2019 (aged 67); Mumbai, Maharashtra, India

Shyam Ramsay (17 May 1952 – 18 September 2019) was a Bollywood film director. He was one of the seven Ramsay Brothers who were active in Indian cinema throughout the 1970s and the 1980s. Shyam Ramsay was considered the main artist and head of this group. They produced a number of horror movies such as Darwaza (1978), Purana Mandir (1984), and Veerana (1988).

Their popularity waned towards the end of the 1980s, as Ramsay started diverting his creative energy and focus on television programming which was in demand because of the multiple private channels such as Zee TV, Star Plus etc. that were launched in the early nineties in India. He started India's first horror TV series for Zee TV – Zee Horror Show. It was a huge hit and its popularity is proved by the various communities created in its memory on social networking communities like Facebook & Orkut by its fans.

After Zee Horror Show, he made a few episodes of Saturday Suspense, X Zone and Nagin for Zee TV. In 2008, he along with his daughter, Saasha Ramsay, directed a supernatural series based on the concept of wishful female serpent for Sahara One, called Neeli Aankhen.

Shyam Ramsay came back to feature films from the year 2000 when he started the production of Dhund: The Fog which was released on 21 February 2003. Then he made Ghutan in 2007 and a comedy horror film, Bachao in 2010. His latest release Neighbours released in January 2014.

== Films directed ==
- Gentayangan (2018)
- Koi Hai (2017)
- Neighbours (2014)
- Bachaao - Inside Bhoot Hai... (2010)
- Ghutan (2007)
- Dhund: The Fog (2003)
- Talashi (2000)
- Nagin (1999) (TV series)
- Anhonee (1998) (TV series)
- The Zee Horror Show (1993–97) (TV series)
- Mahakaal (1993)
- Police Mathu Dada (1991)
- Inspector Dhanush (1991)
- Ajooba Kudrat Ka (1991)
- Bandh Darwaza (1990)
- Purani Haveli (1989)
- Veerana (1988)
- Tahkhana (1986)
- Telephone (1985)
- Saamri (1985)
- Purana Mandir (1984)
- Ghungroo Ki Awaaz (1981)
- Hotel (1981)
- Sannata (1981)
- Dahshat (1981)
- Saboot (1980)
- Guest House (1980 film) (1980)
- Aur Kaun? (1979)
- Darwaza (1978)
- Andhera (1975)
- Do Gaz Zameen Ke Neeche (1972)
- Nakuli Shaan (1971)

== Films edited ==
- Veerana (1988)
- Khel Mohabbat Ka (1986) (as Shyam)
- Telephone (1985)
- Purana Mandir (1984)
- Ghungroo Ki Awaaz (1981)
- Dahshat (1981) (co-editor)
- Saboot (19 deep in the world is a great80) (co-editor)
- Guest House (1980) (co-editor)

== Films written ==
- Inspector Dhanush (1991) (story) (as Tulsi-Shyam)
- Bandh Darwaza (1990) (screenplay)
- Veerana (1988) (screenplay)
- Buddha Mil Gaya (1971) (story) (as Shyam)

== Films produced ==
- Ghutan (2007) (producer)
- Bandh Darwaza (1990)
- Veerana (1988)
- Saamri 3D (1986) (producer)
