= Ghungroo Ki Awaaz =

- Poster
- Directed by: Ramsay Brothers
- Produced by: Vijay Anand
- Starring: Vijay Anand; Rekha
- Music by: R. D. Burman
- Release date: 29 September 1981
- Running time: 138 minutes
- Country: India
- Language: Hindi

Ghungroo Ki Awaaz (transl. Sound of the anklets) is a 1981 Bollywood Horror-Mystery Film directed by the Ramsay Brothers and produced by Vijay Anand. It features Vijay Anand, Rekha in the lead roles. The music was composed by R. D. Burman. It was loosely inspired by the 1958 American thriller Vertigo.

== Plot ==
Thakur Ranjeet Singh buys Kajal's freedom from a panderer and installs her in his house with the status of a daughter-in-law, much to the disgust of his uncle, Jasbeer. When the sleazy Shakaal turns up and arranges a secret meeting with Kajal, Ranjeet believes that he has caught his beloved being unfaithful. He exacts a fearful retribution. Obligingly, Jasbeer destroys the evidence. Ranjeet finds himself being plagued by the restless spirit of Kajal as well as a suspicious policeman. Seeking respite in Bombay, he is stunned to see Kajal's doppelgaenger, a nurse called Kiran. Unnerved, he brings Kiran home with him and finds himself falling in love again. The mystery deepens when Kajal's vengeful spirit murders the usurper, sending Ranjeet over the edge and into an asylum.

== Cast ==
- Vijay Anand as Thakur Ranjeet Singh
- Rekha as Kajal / Kiran
- Shreeram Lagoo as Jasbeer Singh "Mamaji"
- Leela Mishra as Damayanti "Dai Maa"
- Agha as Butler
- Iftekhar as Dr. Dixit
- Pinchoo Kapoor as Daroga
- Dheeraj Kumar as Shakaal
- Padma Khanna as Dancer
- Harindranath Chattopadhyay as Nawab Jung Bahadur
- Leela Mishra

== Soundtrack ==
Vijay Anand has written the lyrics of all songs and R. D. Burman has composed the music.

Song	Singer
"Tere Ghungroo Ki Awaaz"	Kishore Kumar
"Akhiyon Ka Kajra, Haathon Ka Gajra, Kaanon Ka Jhumka"	Kishore Kumar, Asha Bhosle
"Jo Bhi Tune Dekha"	Asha Bhosle
"Roti Roti Raina"	Asha Bhosle
"Pagla Pagla"	Suresh Wadkar
