= Saboot =

- Poster
- Directed by: Tulsi Ramsay; Shyam Ramsay
- Written by: Jay Verma; J. K. Ahuja
- Produced by: Raaj Baweja; G. H. Navani
- Starring: Navin Nischol; Kajal Kiran; Vidya Sinha; Vinod Mehra
- Cinematography: Gangu Ramsay; Keshu Ramsay
- Edited by: Shyam Ramsay; Bal Korde
- Music by: Bappi Lahiri
- Release date: 28 February 1980
- Running time: 132 min.
- Country: India
- Language: Hindi

Saboot (transl. Evidence) is a 1980 Indian Hindi-language horror/thriller film directed by Shyam Ramsay and Tulsi Ramsay. It stars Navin Nischol, Kajal Kiran, Vidya Sinha, with Vinod Mehra, Prem Chopra, Padma Khanna, Om Shivpuri and Trilok Kapoor.

== Plot ==
Seth Dharamdas has two daughters, Asha and Kajal. Dharamdas has struck a business deal with Dhanraj. Asha marries her love interest Vikas, but he dies in an air crash. Dharamdas cancels his plan to sell the factory and decides to dedicate the factory as a souvenir to Vikas.

Dhanraj doesn't want the deal to be cancelled. He bribes Dharamdas's trusted employees Manmohan Saxena, Ashok Gupta and Rita to kill Dharamdas. Dharamdas is on his way to Nainital for a business trip. Dhanraj, Ashok and Manmohan approach him in the train and force him to sign an agreement that makes Dhanraj to be the sole owner of all his riches. The crooks then kill him and bury him nearby. During the fracas, Ashok's knife falls into the grave, but he is in a hurry and can't take it out.

Asha and Kajal are unaware of the truth. They believe that their father has gone missing. Inspector Anand, an old friend of Vikas, is called to handle the case.

Suddenly, the ghost of Dharamdas starts confronting his killers and they are struck by panic. When they start dying mysteriously, Anand figures out that there is some connection between their deaths and the disappearance of Dharamdas. Anand sets up traps, thinking that Dharamdas is alive and is killing his associates for some unknown reason. When Dhanraj is killed, Anand sees Dharamdas and shoots him.

== Cast ==
- Navin Nischol as CBI Inspector Anand
- Kajal Kiran as Kajal
- Vidya Sinha as Asha
- Vinod Mehra as Vikas
- Prem Chopra as Dhanraj
- Roopesh Kumar as Manmohan Saxena
- Narendranath as Ashok Gupta
- Padma Khanna as Rita
- Trilok Kapoor as Dharamdas
- Om Shivpuri as Ajit Rai

== Soundtrack ==
Lyrics: Amit Khanna

Song	Singer
"Dooriyan Sab Mita"	Lata Mangeshkar
"Jeena Bhi Koi Jeena Hai" (Happy)	Lata Mangeshkar, Kishore Kumar
"Jeena Bhi Koi" (Sad)	Kishore Kumar
"Ladki O Ladki"	Amit Kumar, Bappi Lahiri
"Loot Ada Ko"	Asha Bhosle
