= Bandh Darwaza =

- Theatrical release poster
- Directed by: Shyam Ramsay; Tulsi Ramsay
- Written by: Dev Kishan; Shyam Ramsay
- Produced by: Shyam Ramsay
- Starring: Manjeet Kullar; Kunika; Aruna Irani; Hashmat Khan; Chetana Das; Anirudh Agarwal
- Cinematography: Gangu Ramsay
- Edited by: Keshav Hirani
- Music by: Anand–Milind (Soundtrack)
- Release date: 7 May 1990
- Running time: 145 minutes
- Country: India
- Language: Hindi

Bandh Darwaza (transl. Closed Door) is a 1990 Indian Hindi-language horror film starring Kunika, Shubham Upadhyay, Manjeet Kullar, Aruna Irani, Anirudh Agarwal and the Afghan actor Hashmat Khan. The film's soundtrack was composed by brothers Anand–Milind.

== Plot ==
The film opens in the ruins of Kali Pahari ( the Black Hills, a decrepit complex of caves), and introduces Nevla. Nevla, a Dracula-like vampire, sleeps in a coffin by day, and transforms into a bat at night to hunt humans from the neighbouring villages. He craves a steady supply of human blood, and a supply of fresh young women (so he may seduce them and spread his evil seed). Nevla is assisted by a ragtag bunch of servants who lure innocent humans (mostly women) to Kali Pahari so Nevla may easily prey on them. His servants include Mahua (a witch-woman), Mahaguru (an evil priest), a tantrik (an evil sorcerer) and various other henchmen that provide muscle for his evil deeds.

Mahua is employed as a maid in the household of a righteous Thakur Pratap. The Thakur spots her speaking with Baku one evening. Aware of Baku's association with the evils of Kali Pahari, the Thakur threatens to fire Mahua if she is ever caught with any of the gang again. Mahua, however, is under orders to source a new maiden for Nevla.

Sapna says she was not dreaming and shows them the book she mistakenly dropped there last night. On the way they meet Kamya, who invites the trio to her birthday party. Things get interesting when Kumar begins to show affection towards Sapna at Kamya's birthday party. Shaken by this, Kamya taunts Sapna, due to which Sapna leaves the venue. Kamya makes a move on Kumar but he bluntly snubs her. On her way back home, Sapna encounters the woman who was stabbed the previous night. She demands her book and sits in Sapna's car. Sapna reaches home and finds the book. In the meanwhile, Kumar reaches Sapna's home searching for her as she had left the party midway. Sapna tells him about that strange woman. Kumar throws the book out of her house and tells her to stop thinking about all this. Kamya finds the book as she was following Kumar. She reaches home and reads the book and finds ways how she can achieve Kumar through witchcraft. While driving, that strange woman (of the Kali Pahari gang), crashes her car, and is taken by the gang to the altar of Nevla. Kamya is cured of her injuries by the priest by black magic and they tell her she can achieve everything if she joins their gang, and she agrees.

Kamya practices witchcraft on Kumar at a graveyard. He reaches there and starts making love to her. Anand and Sapna reach there and rescue Kumar. Anand finds Kumar's photograph at the graveyard and instantly believes that Kamya is behind all this as he has seen Kamya before with the strange people of Kali Pahari. One day Kamya is invited to Kali Pahari at night for a ritual. It's a trap to get Kamya to revive Nevla, who was asleep all these years. He recognises Kamya, bites her and sleeps with her. She is now forever trapped behind the bandh darwaza and is a sex slave to Nevla. Kumar, Anand and Sapna enter Kali Pahari to rescue Kamya. They finally find her, barely conscious, deep within the catacombs in a glass coffin. They try to rescue her, but the place gets filled with smoke and Nevla abducts her.

Kamya is hypnotised by the tantrik to serve Nevla forever and gets orders to source more women for Nevla. She approaches Bhanu (Anand's wife) and lures her to Kali Pahari, but Kumar, Anand and some of his friends arrive there in time to rescue Bhanu before Nevla can seduce her. Kamya's next target is Sapna. Sapna, too, is rescued in the nick of time, but Kumar and Anand discover that Kamya is behind all this. They report back to the Thakur, and he decides to finish Nevla once and for all. Upon entering Kali Pahari, the Thakur finds Mahua, who informs him with evil glee of the bargain behind the birth of Kamya, and that Kamya is now entirely under Nevla's power. Furious, the Thakur beheads Mahua. But Nevla is unstoppable. He beckons Bhanu once again, and this time, he succeeds in biting her. Nevla attacks Sapna yet again, and follows her to the Thakur's home. After a prolonged chase, Nevla kills both Bhanu and Anand and nearly gets Sapna, but is thwarted in the nick of time by the Thakur. The Thakur reveals the tale of Kamya's birth to Kumar and Sapna.

The three of them enter Kali Pahari to recover Kamya. They finally find her, barely conscious, deep within the catacombs. They are immediately set upon by the gang, various henchmen, and Nevla himself. They fight their way out and wound Nevla once again, but are somehow unable to kill him. As Kamya tries to kill Nevla by stabbing him with a dagger, she too is surrounded by goons. They hurl her upon the iron door, laden with pointed spikes. The spikes pierce Kamya's body, thus killing her. The evil woman and the tantrik carry away Nevla in a brougham. Kumar gives chase, and captures the tantrik, and threatens to kill him unless he discloses Nevla's Achilles heel. The tantrik reveals that Nevla's soul is trapped within a statue at Kali Pahari and his weakness is sunlight. Kumar and the Thakur devise a two phase plan to finish Nevla. Kumar and Sapna follow the brougham away from Kali Pahari, and round up the townsfolk to engage Nevla. Nevla attacks them in a frenzy. Just as he gets within reach of Sapna, he is involuntarily seized with pain and bursts into flames (as the Thakur sets the evil statue afire).

The film ends with Kumar, Sapna and the Thakur looking on as Nevla is destroyed forever.

== Cast ==
- Manjeet Kullar as Sapna
- Hashmat Khan as Kumar
- Kunickaa Sadanand as Kamya
- Aruna Irani as Mahua
- Anita Sareen as Bhanu
- Vijayendra Ghatge as Thakur Pratap Singh
- Raza Murad as evil sorcerer Shaitan Pujari
- Anirudh Agarwal as Nevla the Vampire/Dracula
- Satish Kaul as Anand
- Beena Banerjee as Thakurayan Lajo
- Johnny Lever as Gopi, Thakur's servant
- Shayamalee as the strange woman of Kali Pahari
- Jack Gaud as Nevla's devotee
- Ashalata Wabgaonkar as Kumar's mother
- Karunakar Pathak
- Gurinder Kohli
- Rajni Bala

== Soundtrack ==
| No. | Title | Singer(s) | Length |
|---|---|---|---|
| 1. | "Bheega Bheega Mausam Tadpaye" | Suresh Wadkar, Sadhana Sargam |
| 2. | "Jalta Hai Kyun Tu" | Alisha Chinai |
| 3. | "Main Ek Chingari Hoon" | Anuradha Paudwal |
| 4. | "Tu Ek Chingari Hai (Sathi mere Sathi)" | Suresh Wadkar |
| 5. | "Kaise main Bhulaoon Tera Pyar" | Suresh Wadkar |
| 6. | "Dil ki Dhadkan Kya kahe" | Suresh Wadkar |

== Reception ==
In his book Horror and Science Fiction Film IV, Donald C Willis commented that only "enthusiasm, lighting effects, and a James Bernard-like score keep the repetitious plot going."
