= Dak bungalow =

Government accommodations in British India

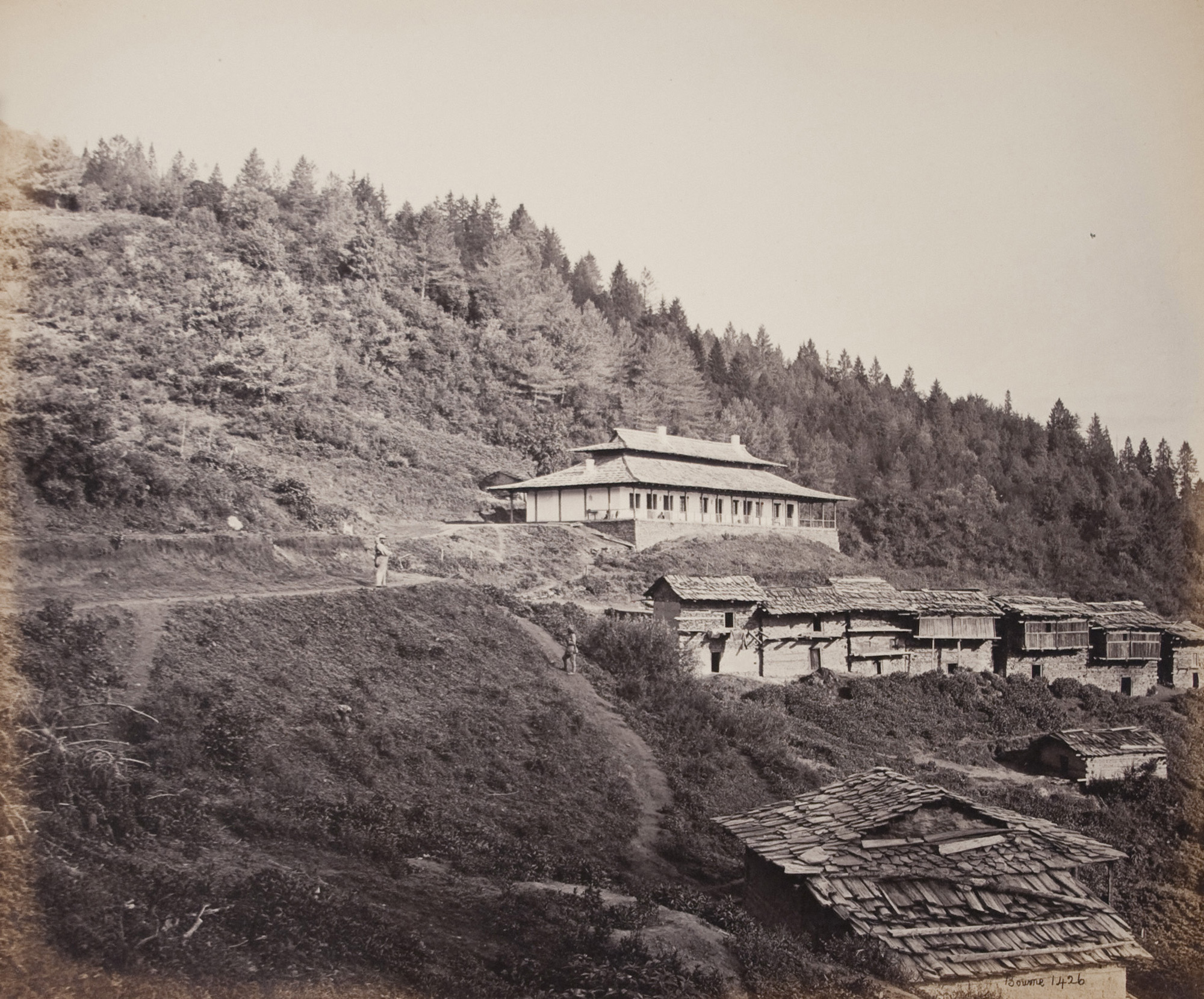
The dak bungalow above Narkanda in 1868

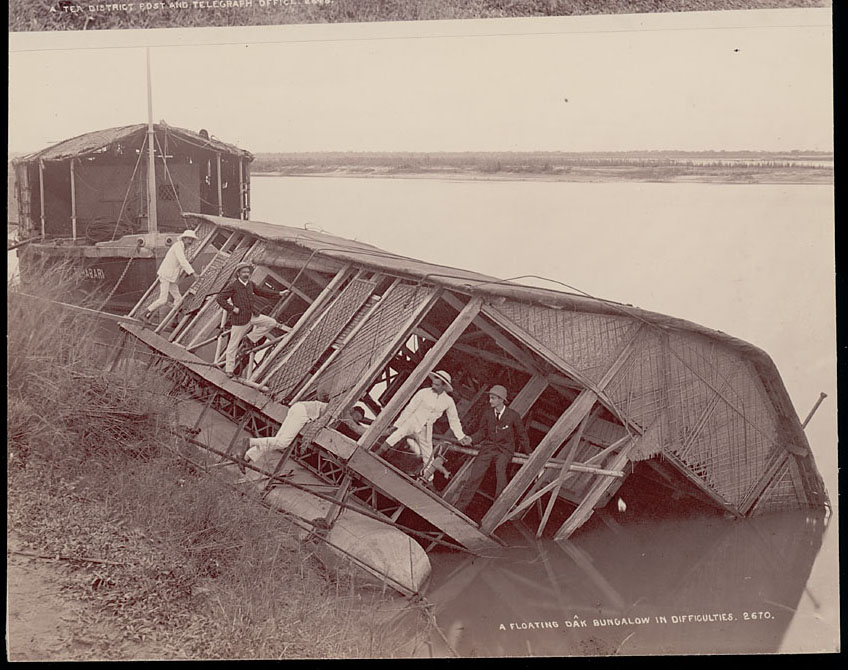
"A floating dâk-bungalow in difficulties", c. 1880

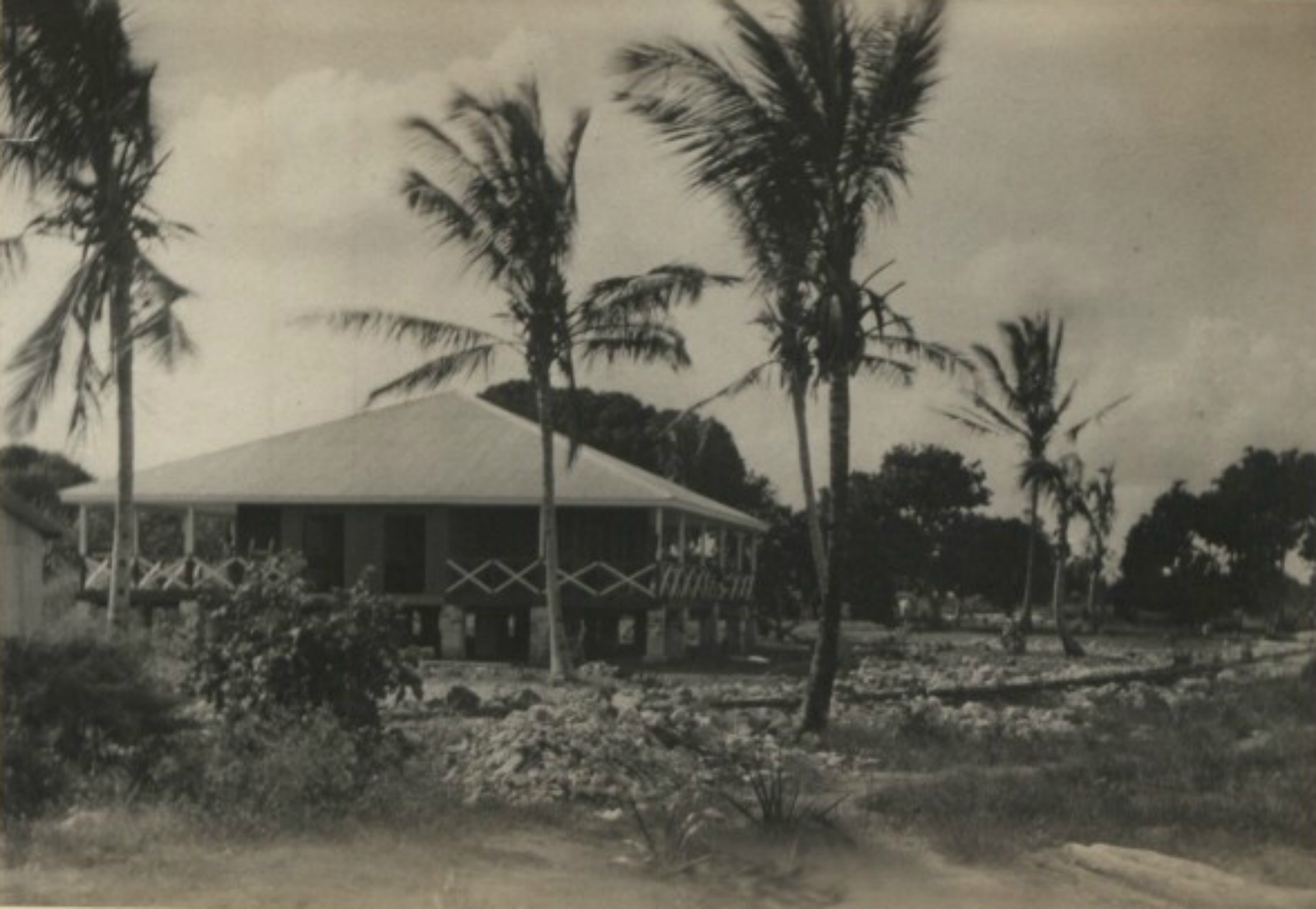
A "dak bungalow " in Kenya, c. 1900. The term was sometimes applied to similar structures throughout the British Empire.

A dak bungalow, dak-house or dâk-bungalow was a government building in British India under Company Rule and the Raj. It may also refer to some similarly built or -used structures in modern India, Bangladesh, and Pakistan.

== Origins ==
The dak bungalows carried on a tradition of caravanserais, dharamshalas, and other guesthouses erected by Indian rulers for both Hindu and Muslim pilgrims.

The India Office possesses a diary with the entry for 25 November 1676 noting "It was thought fitt... to sett up Bungales or Hovells... for all such English in the Company's Service as belong to their Sloopes & Vessells". The dak bungalows proper were first erected in the 1840s, serving as staging posts for the dak, the imperial mail service. Rudyard Kipling's father J. Lockwood Kipling described them as "about as handsome as a stack of hay" and forming a kind of "'irreducible minimum' of accommodation". Each was about 12 to 15 miles (19 to 24 km) from the next along the major roads of the subcontinent.

== Usage ==
The buildings provided free accommodation for government officials and, upon their permission, "incomparably cheap" lodging for other travellers. The structures are therefore sometimes also known as posthouses, resthouses, or travellers' bungalows. Officials at the dak bungalows included the dakwala (postman), the durwan (caretaker), and sometimes a khansamah (attendant). Fees were set by the government; in the 1920s; 8 annas a day for single persons and 12 for married couples (Rs. ½ or ¾; 6 or 9 g of .917% silver). Guests were liable for reimbursing them for any damage and for the costs of supplies used, including grass for the horses, firewood, and food. Beds were uncommon, as the Raj officials were expected to travel with their own bedding and servants. The khansamah could provide dining for those without their own cook, the common fare being eggs and chicken dishes. The Dak Bungalows were set up along main roads with few rooms to accommodate visiting officials who are on visit or on journey.

In remote areas, most government work—including hearing legal cases—occurred at the dak bungalows when the district officials visited. At district headquarters, the circuit house provided a larger courtroom and better accommodations for visiting sessions judges. Larger cities might have still more specialized buildings.

During the Indian Rebellion of 1857 the network of bungalows was used by escaping British civilians and soldiers but saw several massacres outside Delhi. Following the suppression of the rebellion and the assumption of rule by the British government, thatch was prohibited for use in official buildings. They feature in the fiction of Rudyard Kipling: "a fair proportion of the tragedy of our lives out here acted itself in dâk-bungalows... [and] many men have died mad in [them]..." "...nothing is too wild, grotesque, or horrible to happen in a dâk-bungalow."

== Legacy ==
Many dak bungalows fell into disrepair or were later replaced by circuit houses, although some have been maintained and continue in use, as the lodges at the Sipahijola and Radhanagari wildlife sanctuaries.

== See also ==
- Architecture of Chennai
