= Aur Kaun? =

1979 film directed by Tulsi and Shyam Ramsay

- Poster
- Directed by: Shyam Ramsay; Tulsi Ramsay
- Starring: Sachin; Rajni Sharma; Padmini Kapila; Om Shivpuri
- Music by: Bappi Lahiri
- Release date: 9 January 1979
- Country: India
- Language: Hindi

Aur Kaun? (transl. Who else?) is a 1979 Bollywood horror film directed by Shyam Ramsay and Tulsi Ramsay. The music of the film composed by Bappi Lahiri was popular in 1979, especially the song "Haan Pehli Baar" sung by Kishore Kumar. The title song was sung by Lata Mangeshkar in her haunting melody style.

== Plot ==
Aur Kaun? is a 1979 Indian horror-mystery film that follows Raj, a young man whose life takes a strange turn after his older teacher, Mona, begins to show an unusual romantic interest in him. Before long, Mona is mysteriously found dead, and the circumstances around her death suggest something supernatural may be involved. As Raj becomes entangled in the investigation, eerie incidents begin occurring around him, hinting at a ghostly presence and a dark secret from the past. The film builds suspense through its haunted-house atmosphere, mysterious characters, and the lingering question of who — or what — is truly behind the terror.

== Cast ==
- Roopesh Kumar
- Madan Puri
- Sachin
- Om Shivpuri as Ram Saroop
- Sachin as Raj
- Rajni Sharma as Komal
- Padmini Kapila as Mona

== Songs ==
The songs were composed by Bappi Lahiri.

All lyrics are written by Amit Khanna.

No.	Title	Singer(s)	Length
1.	"Ha Pehli Bar Ek Ladki Mera"	Kishore Kumar
2.	"Aur Kaun Aayega"	Lata Mangeshkar
3.	"Dilwali Kidhar Se Aayi Hai"	Vijeyata Pandit
4.	"Raat Ayi Re"	Sulakshana Pandit, Bappi Lahiri
