= Dahshat =

- Film poster
- Directed by: Shyam Ramsay & Tulsi Ramsay
- Music by: Bappi Lahiri
- Release date: 1981
- Country: India
- Language: Hindi

Dahshat (trans. Horror)is a 1981 Bollywood horror film directed by Shyam Ramsay and Tulsi Ramsay.

== Plot ==
Dr. Sameer has just returned to his native place Chandan Nagar after finishing his medical studies in Russia. He is assisted by Dr. Bakshi, a vet by profession, but looks to be a close relative of a roadside juggler. Sameer is welcomed by his family and is greeted by his childhood crush Kiran, with whom he soon gets romantically entangled. Sameer discovers a horrible secret and terror that anonymously lies in the vicinity. It seems a grave robber is digging up graves for some reason and is stealing the cadavers. Sameer decides to look into the issue and soon meets success after a heavy affaire d'honneur. The grave-digger is a grotesque mute man, who is soon arrested by the Police. Sameer somehow traces the hideout of the mute man. It's Dr. Vishal's house. Dr. Vishal is an unfaithful husband, who frequently has run-ins with his drunkard wife Mrs. Vishal. Sameer (with Kiran) gets inside the mansion and finds a laboratory full of several live caged animals awaiting shady consequences. Dr. Vishal goes red with anger when he finds Sameer in his lab. Sameer however wins Dr. Vishal's favor by making one of his broken apparatuses work. Sameer discovers that Dr. Vishal is working on animal attributes and wants to assimilate their abilities into the human body so as to make his dream of making a superhuman come true. Sameer warns Dr. Vishal not to mess with nature, but Dr. Vishal scoffs at Sameer's trivial talks. One night, Mrs. Vishal finds Vishal seducing his kept woman. Enraged, Mrs. Vishal injects a deadly animal serum into Vishal's body, and its at this point the real horror starts. Now he turns into a bloodthirsty monster at night.

== Cast ==
- Navin Nischol as Dr. Sameer
- Om Shivpuri as Dr. Vishal
- Sarika as Kiran
- Nadira as Mrs. Vishal
- Madan Puri as Sameer's father
- Pinchoo Kapoor
- Rajendra Nath as Dr. Bakshi
- Dev Kumar as Grave Digger

== Music ==
The music was composed by Bappi Lahiri.

- "Mere Pyar Ka Meter" - Kishore Kumar
- . "Meri Jaan" - Bappi Lahiri, Sulakshana Pandit
- "Mera Yaar Gussewala" - Asha Bhosle
- "Disco Title Music" - Instrumental
