= Darwaza =

- Poster
- Directed by: Shyam Ramsay; Tulsi Ramsay
- Written by: Kumar Ramsay
- Screenplay by: Kumar Ramsay
- Starring: Anil Dhawan; Satyendra Kapoor; Rakesh Pandey; Anju Mahendru; Shakti Kapoor; Trilok Kapoor
- Music by: Sapan Jagnmohan
- Release date: 21 January 1978
- Running time: 120 minutes
- Country: India
- Language: Hindi

Darwaza (transl. The Door) is a 1978 Bollywood horror film directed by Shyam Ramsay and Tulsi Ramsay.

== Plot ==
Thakur Pratap Singh has lost his loved ones due to a curse put on him and his family by a widow, whose son Dharma was unintentionally killed by Pratap Singh long ago. Now Pratap Singh is on his death bed, tended by his extremely loyal servant Shankar. Pratap Singh calls his friend Professor to his Haveli and asks him to take his son Suraj to one of his friends in Mumbai. Moments later we see that Thakur dies and the Professor and his charioteer Shambhu Kaka are attacked by a gruesome, ghastly, vengeful deformed ghoul. With much valor Shambhu Kaka saves Suraj and scrams, but Professor, not so lucky, dies a macabre death.

Time goes by and now Suraj has grown up and is in love with his uncle's daughter Rachna. After few romantic sequences they get married. However, not everything goes on suavely as Suraj is tormented by the haunting memories of past. He decides to take matter in his hands and heads to the Haveli with Rachna. On the way they encounter an old woman, who scorns Suraj's decision of going to the Haveli. She tells him that her son Ganga, once a popular village lad, lost his life in the caves behind the Haveli. Suraj dismisses her story and takes his way to the Haveli. Ahead they meet some hoodlums who try to take advantage of Rachna's solitariness, while Suraj is out to bring water for the fuming car radiator. Suraj arrives just in time and saves Rachna. They are then aided by a local village girl Shaila, who is the jovial daughter of the village headman or Sardar. That night, during their halt, Rachna is attacked by the monster, who topples their car and disappears in dark. Suraj goes looking for it when he lands up at the Haveli and finds Shankar cleaning bloodstains dotted on the floor. Rachna somehow manages to save her life and soon joins Suraj at the Haveli.

Upon arrival, Suraj is given a warm welcome by the villagers. Sardar tells Suraj that Pratap Singh was his old buddy and laments his death.

The village extremist Shakal's, younger brother of Dharma, and Goga dislike the friendly attitude of Sardar towards Suraj and arouse Suraj for a fight. A violent duel ensues between Shakal and Suraj with Suraj's decisive victory. Meanwhile, Rachna happens to discover Shambhu Kaka's corpse and takes to her heels to tell Suraj. However, when they return the dead body is nowhere to be seen. Shakal wants to settle scores with Suraj (for Pratap Singh's atrocities) for the untimely death of his brother Dharma and his mother. His wife Reshma tries to persuade Shakal to leave the dog-eat-dog attitude but Shakal is blinded by revenge and believes that killing Suraj would do justice to the souls of his deceased mother and brother. At night Reshma goes to the Haveli to make Suraj understand about the impending peril he and Rachna could face. At the Haveli she finds Shankar sneaking out of a hidden door. With much curiosity Reshma opens the door (unbeknownst to anyone else) and finds that the door opens to a dungeon. Several minutes later, we see Reshma dead and Shankar digging a grave for her. Afterwards Shakal finds Reshma's bracelet near the grave and Goga blames Suraj for her death. Enraged Shakal kills Shaila as he does not want the Sardar to know about Reshma's death.

Meanwhile, Goga and his men raid the Haveli and torment Rachna. Rachna somehow escapes but ends up at the dungeon. Goga and his men are killed by the monster and Rachna witnesses their horrendous deaths. Suraj and the village men reach dungeon and find a scared Rachna and the dead bodies of Goga and his henchmen. They also see a cloaked figure who is revealed to be none other than Pratap Singh. Suraj takes Pratap Singh to the Haveli and it looks like Pratap Singh is living a vegetable life after having lost his memory, eyesight and hearing ability. Shakal frames Suraj and his father by showing Shaila's corpse to Sardar and puts the blame on them. Sardar orders Shakal to kill the culprits and Shakal thus gets a chance to quench his blood thirst. With several villagers, Shakal goes to the Haveli and demands an eye-for-an-eye and tooth-for-a-tooth justice. Finally Shakal breaks into the Haveli and ends up in Pratap Singh's room. Where he starts whipping Pratap Singh only to find out that Pratap Singh is the monster. The monster throws Shakal out of the window killing him and also kills Shankar in front of Suraj and Rachna. While dying Shankar informs Suraj that the Trident in the temple of Kaali Mata is the only way to stop the monster. Suraj and Rachna somehow manage to move out of the Haveli but are stopped by the villagers waiting outside it. Meanwhile, the monster comes out of the Haveli and the villagers who are surrounding the Haveli start running towards the temple. The monster tries killing the Sardar in the temple when Suraj kills the monster with the trident (Trishul). The ceiling of the temple collapses on the monster who returns to his human form before dying. Suraj and all the villagers come to know that the monster was none other than Thakur Pratap Singh. Holding his last breath Pratap Singh reveals that due to his evil deeds the curse turned him into the monster and that is the reason why he did not want his son to be here. In the end, Thakur dies in Suraj's arm.

== Cast ==
- Anil Dhawan as Suraj Singh
- Satyendra Kapoor as Ganga
- Rakesh Pandey as Dharma
- Anju Mahendru as Reshma
- Shakti Kapoor as Goga
- D.K. Sapru as Sardar
- Randhir Singh as Monster
- Imtiaz Khan as Shakaal
- Sheetal as Shaila
- Krishan Dhawan as Rachna's Father
- Trilok Kapoor as Thakur Pratap Singh
- Kumud Tripathi
- Bhagwan Dada
- Appi Umrani

== Soundtrack ==
All lyrics are written by Naqsh Lyallpuri; all music is composed by Sapan Jagnmohan.

No.	Title	Singer(s)	Length
1.	"Hosh Mein Hum Kahan"	Amit Kumar
2.	"Lo Hamen Bahon Mein"	Asha Bhosle
3.	"Ae Ji Kahan Gum Ho"	Asha Bhosle
