= I Am Woman awards =

I Am Woman is a platform created by the Karan Gupta Education Foundation and IE Business School to celebrate and award the inspiration of women. At the event power women speak about their professional and personal challenges and how they overcame them.

Recipients of the I Am Woman 2016 awards have included Sonam Kapoor for her performance in the film Neerja, Lucky Morani, Amrita Raichand, Devita Saraf among others.

In April 2017 the I Am Woman awards went to Amruta Fadnavis, Laxmi Agarwal, Gauri Sawant, Krishika Lulla, Farah Khan Ali, Malini Agarwal and Shaheen Mistri for their contributions towards women empowerment.

In the third edition of I Am Woman in 2018 Sushmita Sen, Leah Tata, Michelle Poonawalla, Bhavna Jasra, Falguni Peacock, Malishka RJ, Abha Singh, Preethi Srinivasan, and Jyoti Dhawale were awarded. The event was compared by Amber Wigmore and Madhoo. In this edition of the I Am Woman awards, nominations for the awards were opened to the public and thousands of responses were received. Guests and celebrities at the prestigious award ceremony included Maheka Mirpuri, Sheeba Akashdeep, Reshma Merchant, Farah Khan Ali, Aarti and Kailash Surendranath, Mreenal Deshraj, Vikas Bhalla, Kiran Bawa, Arzoo Gowitrikar, Aditi Govitrikar among others.

In April 2019, Karan Gupta hosted the 4th edition of I Am Woman. The winners included Sonali Bendre, designer Neeta Lulla, Genesis Luxury co-founder Deepika Gehani, Priya Kumar, Infosys learning head Kisha Gupta, lawyer Deepika Singh Rajawat and social activists Sindhutai Sapkal and Neehari Mandali. The hosts for the panel discussions were Manasi Joshi Roy, Manasi Scott and actors Rohit Roy, Parvin Dabas and Tanuj Virwani. Guests and celebrities at the prestigious award ceremony included Divya Seth, Vidya Malvade, Sandip Soparrkar, Aarti and Kailash Surendranath, among others. Previous ‘I Am Woman’ award winners Reshma Merchant, Kiran Bawa, Maheka Mirpuri and Bhavna Jasra were also present. Sonali Bendre advised women to be financially independent.

In Sep 2024, Karan Gupta hosted the 5th edition of the I Am Woman awards and felicitated Richa Chadha with the Woman of Substance award. Other awardees in business included Nawaz Modi Singhania, Resham Chhabria, Minal Deshpande and Suzannah Muthoot. Awardees for women's rights included Dr. Rishma Pai and Senior Advocate Mrunalini Deshmukh. Activists Chandni Di and Swaranlatha J were also awarded. The hosts for the event included Rohit Roy, Zayed Khan, Madhoo, and Taher Shabbir.

== See also ==
- List of awards honoring women
