= Aarti Gupta Surendranath =

Indian model and actress

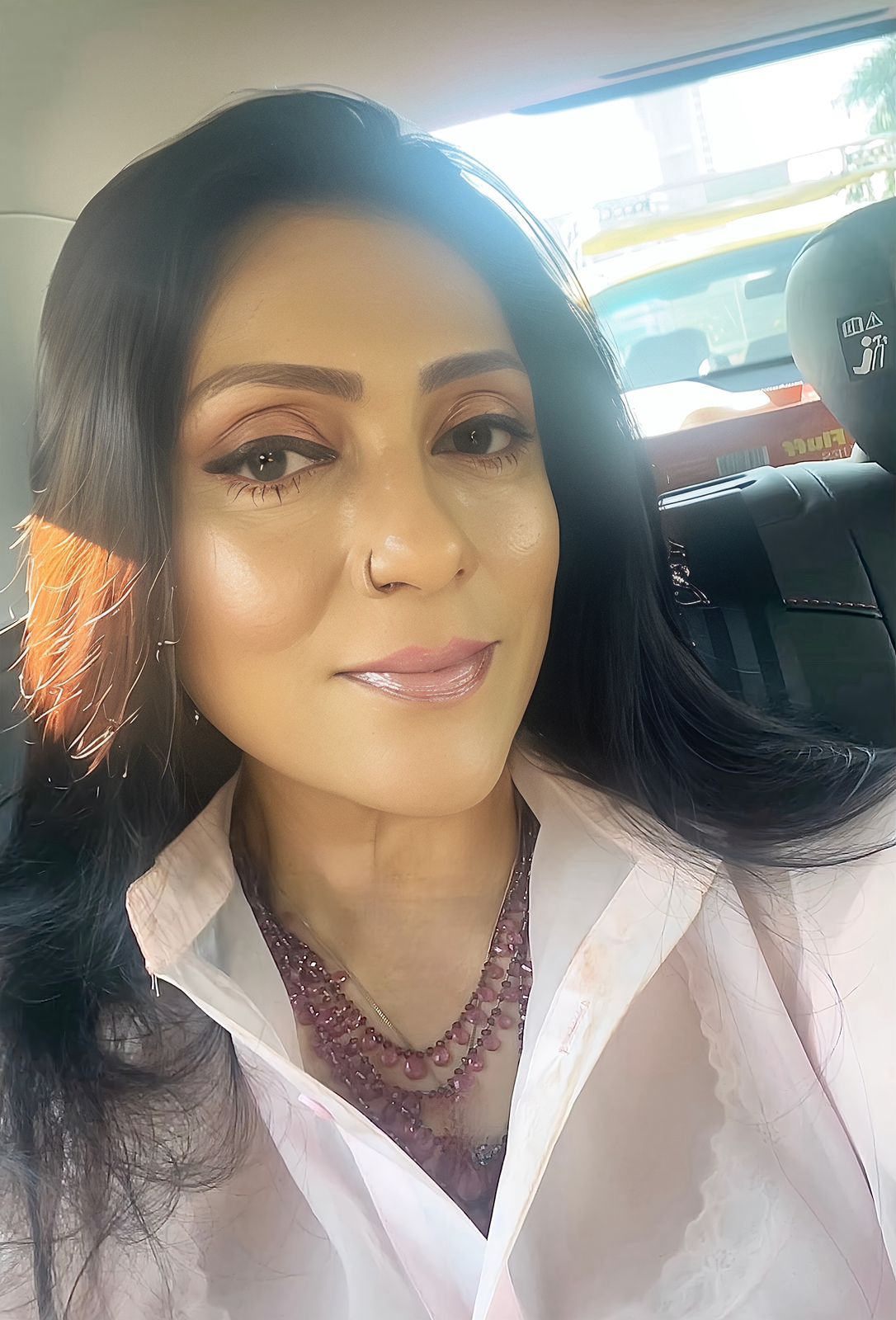
- Born: Simla, Himachal Pradesh, India
- Other name: Aarti Gupta
- Occupation: Model • Actress • Producer • Stylist • Creative Consultant
- Years active: 1980s–present
- Known for: Modelling, Films, Advertising, Wildlife Advocacy
- Spouse: Kailash Surendranath (m.1985)
- Children: 2

Aarti Gupta Surendranath is an Indian former model, actress, and producer, who has worked in advertising, film production, and creative consultancy. She is also involved in charitable and social causes, including animal welfare and cultural advocacy.

Born in Shimla, Himachal Pradesh, Gupta Surendranath she began modelling at the age of 15, and appeared in a Sunsilk advertising campaign in the mid-1970s. She later worked in print and television advertising before appearing in films.

She appeared in several Hindi films during the 1980s, including Purana Mandir (1984), and has also worked in advertising and creative production. She also had a fashion venture focused on bridal trousseaus and couture garments.

== Early life and education ==
Aarti Gupta Surendranath (née Gupta) was born in Shimla, Himachal Pradesh. Her father, Major Gyanchandra Gupta, served in the Indian Army’s 3rd Guards Battalion and was an aide-de-camp to the President of India from 1962 to 1967.

She attended St. Joseph’s Convent of Jesus and Mary in Colaba, Bombay, during one of her father's postings. While at school, she participated in dramatics and began modelling at the age of 15.

== Career ==
=== Modelling ===
Gupta Surendranath began her modelling career while attending school and appeared in a Sunsilk shampoo advertising campaign in the mid-1970s. During the 1970s and 1980s, she appeared in print and television advertisements for consumer brands, Nescafé, Band-Aid, Tata Tea, Clearasil, Charmis Vanishing Cream, Carefree (Johnson & Johnson), Cadbury’s Nut Mate, Brooke Bond Taj Mahal Tea, Pond’s shampoo, Halo Shampoo, Campa Cola and others.

During Campa Cola advertising campaign, she introduced Salman Khan to her then-fiancé, Kailash Surendranath, which led to Salman's first appearance as a model in the entertainment industry. Gupta Surendranath participated in fashion shows and textile advertising campaigns in India. She appeared in campaigns for Garden Sarees campaign, a saree line by Bombay Dyeing and also appeared in textile campaigns, including Modella Suitings’ 1981 “Bonded” series.

She was also featured in Cine Blitz in pictorials for Tajurba and Zamaane Ko Dikhana Hai, appeared as the cover girl for the October 1986 issue of Swagat, and was featured on a Holi themed cover of Dharamyug. She also appeared in many Star & Style print magazines during that period.

=== Acting and Film Work ===
Gupta Surendranath appeared in Hindi films during the 1980s. She made her acting debut in Purana Mandir (1984), a major box-office success that later attained cult status in the Indian horror genre. She had earlier appeared in Aamne Saamne (1982), an action-crime drama directed by Ashim Samanta, opposite Mithun Chakraborty in which she played the role of Rita.

She next appeared in Apna Jahan (1985) as Komal, the film’s lead characters played by Naseeruddin Shah and Deepti Naval. She continued her work in the horror genre with lead roles in Saamri (1985), recognised as India’s first 3D Hindi horror film, and Tahkhana (1986).

Gupta Surendranath also acted in the film Aashiana (1986), directed by Mahesh Bhatt, where she played the role of a tribal girl.

In addition to Hindi cinema, she also worked in regional cinema, starring as the female lead opposite Mohanlal in the Malayalam film Jeevante Jeevan (1985), directed by J. Williams. She later appeared in Feroz Khan’s Janbaaz (1986), featuring Anil Kapoor, Sridevi and Dimple Kapadia.

Gupta Surendranath’s work in cinema also included appearances in Zamaane Ko Dikhana Hai (1981), where she featured in a dance performance within the competition sequence of the film, and Tajurba (1981), where she performed in a dance sequence and appeared in scenes opposite Raj Babbar, who played the antagonist, with her character depicted as his muse.

She went on to play lead roles in the films Naya Safar (1982) and Begunaah Qaidi (1982), in which she starred opposite Rakesh Roshan, as well as in Sugandh (1982).

In Haadsaa (1983), she appeared in a dance sequence alongside the film’s lead actor. Gupta Surendranath made a cameo in Om Shanti Om (2007), directed by Farah Khan, appearing in the finale sequence alongside Shah Rukh Khan.

=== Advertising and Creative Direction ===
Aarti has worked in advertising, casting and styling and creative consulting for film, television, and fashion projects.

She is credited with identifying Salman Khan during his teenage at a swimming pool, and recommending him for a Campa Cola commercial directed by Kailash Surendranath. This became Khan's first on-screen appearance and an early milestone in his career.

Her advertising work included costume and styling work for a 1982 Nirma washing-powder commercial and creative role in the JCT Phagwara textile advertisement featuring Juhi Chawla in the mid-1980s. In the 1990s, she continued working with major FMCG brands, including co-conceiving, styling, and casting budding actors and child actors including Kunal Khemu, Jugal Hansraj, Hansika Motwani and others.

Aarti has also worked on advertising projects including a Cadbury Drinking Chocolate commercial Jackie Shroff and Sangeeta Bijlani during their early careers.

=== Production Work ===
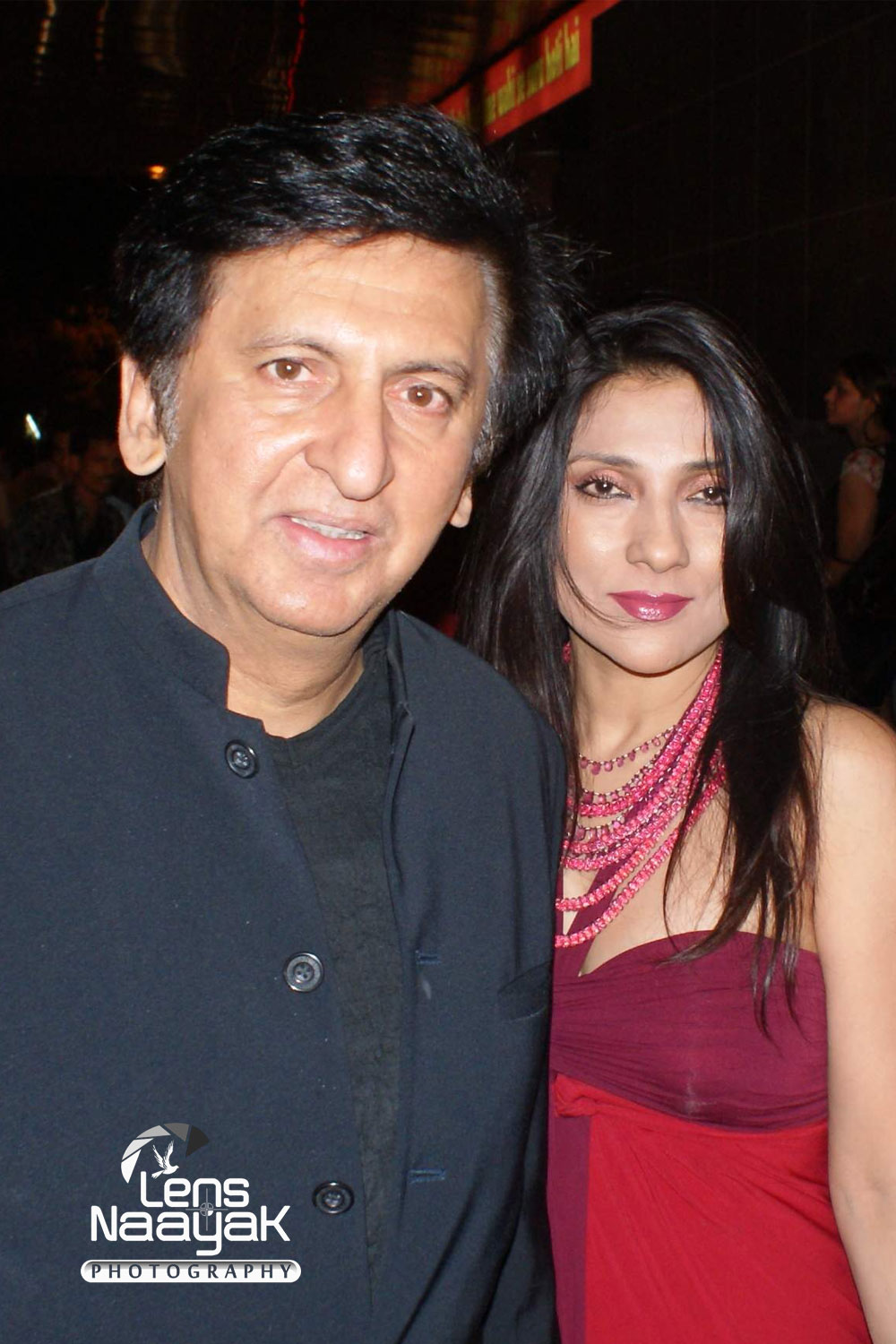
Aarti Gupta Surendranath and Kailash Surendranath for their work 'Mile Sur Mera Tumhara'

Aarti was credited as an associate producer for national integration film Mile Sur Mera Tumhara in 1986. She worked with creative teams, production logistics, and lineup of artists for it. In 2010, she as producer for modern remake of the original Mile Sur Mera Tumhara. It was aimed at resonating with the younger audiences and introduce them to the national integration film.

Gupta was creative producer of Har Ghar Tiranga film. The campaign was launched in connection with India’s Azadi Ka Amrit Mahotsav initiative that encouraged people to display the Indian national flag at their homes and other locations. The film was directed by Kailash Surendranath and produced with a team working across multiple locations in India.

She produced feature film Love You Hamesha (2001), she also oversaw the film’s creative coordination. She as the writer and also worked as creative consultant and stylist.

In 2007, Gupta Surendranath worked as a creative consultant and line producer for the portions shot in India for A Mighty Heart, starring Angelina Jolie.

In 2021, she worked as a creative consultant on Chakrayuh: An Inpesctor Virkar Crime Thriller, produced by Applause Entertainment in association with Mayavid Online LLP.

=== Event Projects ===
Aarti Gupta Surendranath was the event coordinator for a Catalonia-themed cultural and fashion event held in Mumbai on November 27, 2013. The guest included the President of the Government of Catalonia, Indian celebrities, international guests, and government officials. It was aimed to promote cultural and creative collaboration between Spain and India focused on fashion.

=== Art and Cultural Associations ===
She has also been associated with the Indian art and cultural space, including inaugurating exhibitions by contemporary artists such as painter Subodh Poddar in 2009.

== Public Advocacy, Conservation and Charity Work ==
=== Say No to Shahtoosh Campaign (2000–2005) ===
Aarti is actively involved in wildlife conservation, particularly through her work with the Wildlife Trust of India. She has advocated for the protection of the critically endangered animal, the Tibetan antelope (chiru). Its undercoat is used to create shahtoosh shawls, a practice that has led to the decline of the species. She was campaign advisor for the initiative, a collaboration between the Wildlife Trust of India (WTI) and the World Land Trust (UK). The campaign aimed to end the trade and use of shahtoosh shawls. As part of the campaign, Surendranath participated in awareness activities of India’s fashion people and film industry.

=== Emeralds for Elephants Charity Auction (2011) ===
In October 2011, Aarti Gupta Surendranath was involved in the Emeralds for Elephants charity auction held at the Taj Mahal Palace in Mumbai, organized by Gemfields in association with the Wildlife Trust of India (WTI) and the World Land Trust. The initiative aimed to raise funds to establish a network of elephant corridors across India to reduce human-elephant conflict. The project was launched by actress Madhuri Dixit.

Aarti served as the event designer and curator, overseeing the creative execution of the showcase. The collection featured 11 exclusive emerald jewellery pieces, including a 630-carat emerald Ganesh sculpture by artist Arzan Khambatta. The initiative was supported by sponsors such as Jaguar Land Rover, The Taj Hotels, Sotheby’s, and the Gemological Institute of America (GIA India).

=== Social and Civic Engagement ===
Surendranath has also participated in public advocacy efforts, including peace marches and civic protests in Mumbai in 2008 and 2018 for social, humanitarian and environmental causes.

== Honours and Recognition ==
=== IMC Ladies’ Wing Annual Felicitation (2018) ===
On 18 June 2018, she also served as chairperson of the awards committee and moderated the IMC Ladies’ Wing annual felicitation, organized by the Indian Merchants’ Chamber, which felicitated women achievers from various fields.

=== I Am Woman Recognition (2019) ===
In 2019, Aarti Gupta Surendranath and her husband Kailash Surendranath were featured at the IE Business School and Karan Gupta Education Foundation's “I Am Woman” event, which honoured women from diverse fields. They were recognised for their contributions to advertising, culture, and social impact.

=== Femina – We Live in Hope (2025) ===
Aarti was featured in Femina magazine’s special edition titled “We Live in Hope” in January 2025, which profiled Indian women known for their resilience and social impact. In the feature, she shared her journey and thoughts on generational resilience among those born between the 1950s and 1970s, artificial intelligence, gender acceptance, and environmental advocacy.

== Personal life ==
Aarti Gupta Surendranath is married to ad filmmaker Kailash Surendranath. They have two children, a son, Angadveer Surendranath, a director, who co-directed the ‘Har Ghar Tiranga’ campaign and worked on the Bollywood film Race 3 and a daughter, Kshiraja Surendranath, who is a classical Odissi dancer.
