= Karan Gupta =

Indian activist and speaker

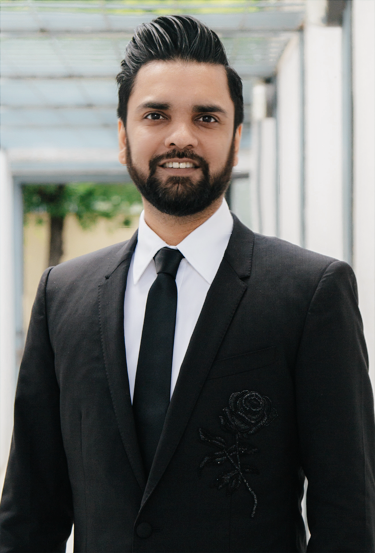
- Born: May 12, 1979 (age 47); Mumbai, India
- Education: Harvard Business School; IE Business School
- Occupations: activist, education consultant, career counsellor
- Writing career
- Notable awards: Times Genius Award by The Times of India, Times Power Men Award by The Times of India
- Website: www.karangupta.com

Karan Gupta (born May 12, 1979) is an activist, education consultant, and career counsellor and the founder of the Karan Gupta Education Foundation (KGEF) in Mumbai, India. He is also the current managing director of IE Business School – India & South Asia.

Gupta is an alumnus of Harvard Business School and IE Business School, graduating with degrees in Psychology, Business and Law. He opened Karan Gupta Consulting and his foundation in 1999, providing career guidance and information on international admissions. Both institutions are non-profit and have an emphasis on the underprivileged – particularly women, children and people suffering from disabilities.

Gupta has written and contributed to The Times of India, Education Times, Hindustan Times, The Free Press Journal and Rediff.com, providing career counseling and admissions advice. In 2016 he was awarded for his efforts by the Wharton Business School, the National Education Awards for "Outstanding Contribution in Education," and the Times Genius Award by The Times of India.

In April 2016 Gupta created an event called I Am Woman, awarding women for their public contributions. Recipients included Lucky Morani, Amrita Raichand, Devita Saraf and a Bollywood actress Sonam Kapoor for her performance in the film Neerja, among others.

In May 2016 Gupta spoke about female empowerment at the IE Alumni Forum in Madrid, Spain.

In April 2017 Gupta hosted the second edition of "I Am Woman", awarding Amruta Fadnavis, Laxmi Agarwal, Gauri Sawant, Krishika Lulla, Farah Khan Ali, Malini Agarwal and Shaheen Mistri for their contributions towards women empowerment.

Karan Gupta was a speaker at the Women Economic Forum and ALL Ladies League in New Delhi in May 2017 and spoke about Women in Media. Other speakers on the panel included Priyanka Chaturvedi, Geeta Mohan, Anurradha Prasad, Aisha Ajmad, and Krishan Tewari.

The third edition of "I Am Woman" was hosted by Gupta in April 2018 awarding Sushmita Sen, Leah Tata, Michelle Poonawalla, Bhavna Jasra, Falguni Peacock, Malishka RJ, Abha Singh, Preethi Srinivasan, and Jyoti Dhawale. The event was compared by Amber Wigmore and Madhoo. Sushmita Sen commended the work done by Karan Gupta and the KGEF team for impacting the lives of 92,000 children.

In July 2018 Gupta spoke about solving rape and child sexual abuse through education and empowerment at a TEDx talk in Mumbai.

The Times of India group felicitated and awarded Gupta as the Times Power Man in December 2018. The award was given to Gupta by Amruta Fadnavis.

In January 2019, at a ceremony held in London, Gupta was awarded with the World Leaders Asia Award by Lord Karan Billimoria and Lord Raj Loomba.

In April 2019, Gupta hosted the 4th edition of the I Am Woman awards and felicitated Sonali Bendre with the Woman of Substance award. Other awardees included Neeta Lulla, Sindhutai Sapkal, Activist Neehari Mandali, Infosys Learning Head Kisha Gupta, Entrepreneur Deepika Gehani among others. The other hosts for the event included Manasi Joshi Roy, Rohit Roy, Parvin Dabas, Manasi Scott, and Tanuj Wirwani.

In July 2020, in a televised interview with India Today (TV channel) Gupta criticised the CBSE board for releasing above average 12th grade results.

Urging Indian universities to release final grades of students, Gupta stated that students who wished to study abroad may lose an entire year.

In Sep 2020, Gupta took the Oxford–AstraZeneca COVID-19 vaccine as a Clinical Trial Volunteer. In Jan 2021, after the vaccine received emergency use authorization, he demanded that the government unblind the vaccine study and give the vaccine shot to the volunteers who received the placebo.

In Oct 2021, Gupta met with Aaditya Thackeray and Iqbal Singh Chahal and spoke about the importance of education and shaping policies that benefit students.

On Children's Day, in Nov 2022, Gupta granted the wishes of terminally and critically ill children at Lokmanya Tilak Municipal Medical College and General Hospital. Also present at the event were actors Boman Irani and Sangram Singh.

In Sep 2023, India Today (TV channel) and The Economic Times spoke to Gupta about the deteriorating security situation in Canada for Indian students and what impact the Canada-India diplomatic row could have on prospective students.

In Sep 2024, Gupta hosted the 5th edition of the I Am Woman awards and felicitated Richa Chadha with the Woman of Substance award. Other awardees in business included Nawaz Modi Singhania, Resham Chhabria, Minal Deshpande and Suzannah Muthoot. Awardees for women's rights included Dr. Rishma Pai and Senior Advocate Mrunalini Deshmukh. Activists Chandni Di and Swaranlatha J were also awarded. The hosts for the event included Rohit Roy, Zayed Khan, Madhoo, and Taher Shabbir.

In Oct 2024, Gupta was featured on the cover of Femina (India) for championing change through education and helping students get into the world's best universities including Ivy League universities.

In Feb 2025, Gupta along with IE University signed an MOU with IIT Bombay to collaborate on exchange programs and research.

In October 2026, Gupta appeared on Figuring Out with Raj Shamani, a podcast hosted by Indian entrepreneur and podcaster Raj Shamani. During the two-hour interview, Gupta discussed international education, university admissions, the financial implications of studying abroad, global employment opportunities, and immigration policies. The conversation also examined the value of international degrees and the challenges facing Indian students seeking careers overseas. Gupta also spoke about his debut book 'The Admission Diaries' which is due for release in Jan 2027.
