= Kailash Surendranath =

Indian advertising filmmaker (born 1950)

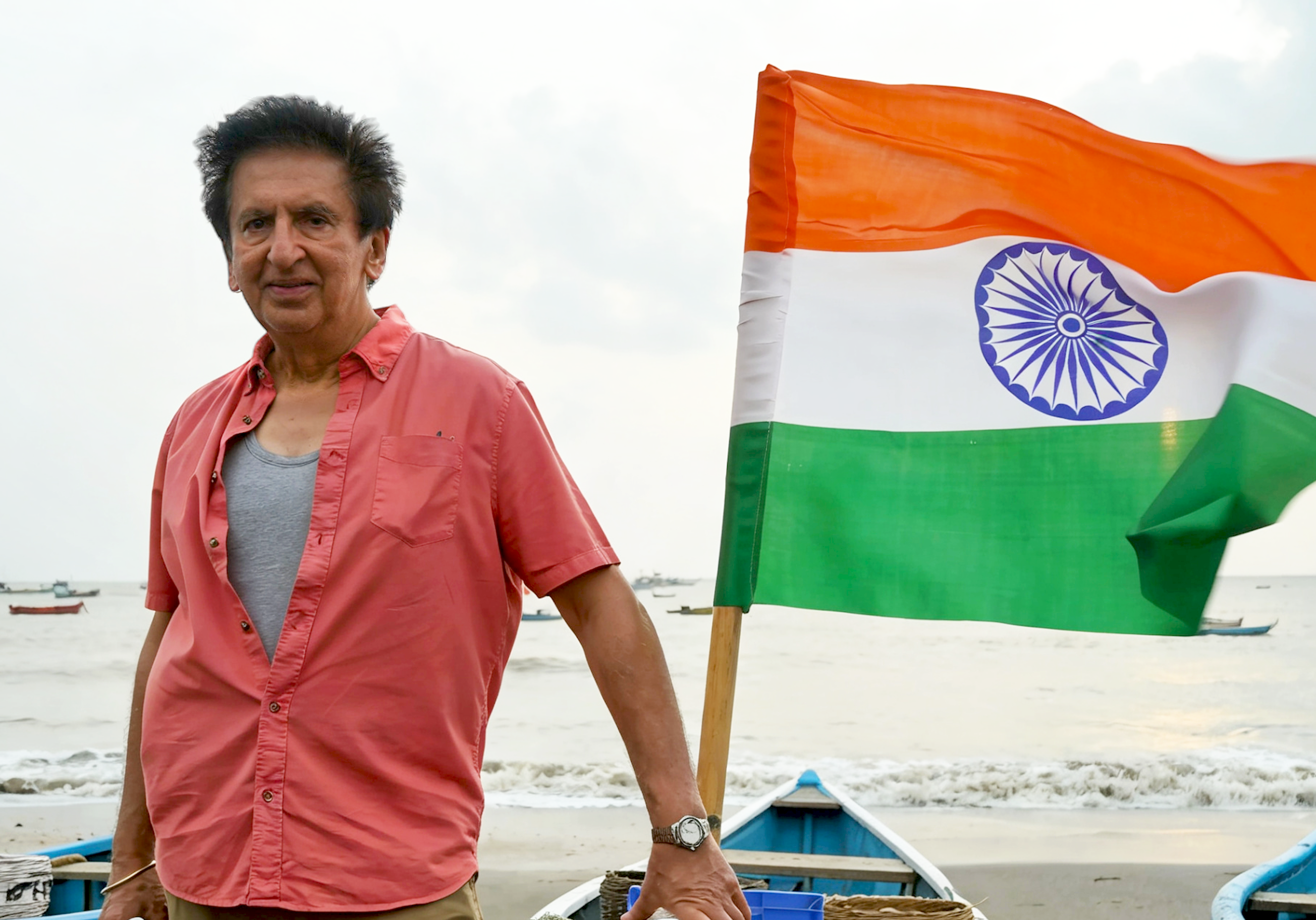
- Kailash Surendranath during the shoot of Har Ghar Tiranga
- Born: 24 June 1950 (age 76)
- Education: St. Xavier's College (BS, Physics and Mathematics)
- Occupations: Filmmaker; director
- Spouse: Aarti Gupta Surendranath
- Children: Angadveer Surendranath Kshiraja Surendranath
- Father: Surendra

Kailash Surendranath (born June 24, 1950) is an Indian filmmaker, advertising director and producer. He has directed over 6,000 television commercials over several decades, and has also worked on numerous films promoting national integration. In 1986, he directed Mile Sur Mera Tumhara, a short film that aimed at promoting India's "unity in diversity", as part of a trilogy produced for Doordarshan's Lok Seva Sanchaar initiative.

In 2022, Surendranath directed Har Ghar Tiranga, his fifth national integration film, commissioned by the Ministry of Culture as part of the Azadi ka Amrit Mahotsav campaign commemorating the 75th anniversary of Indian independence.

Surendranath has directed numerous well-known television advertisements, including the Liril commercial, the Nirma ad campaigns, the Glucose-D advertisement featuring Amjad Khan, and the Campa Cola advertisement featuring Salman Khan and Aarti Gupta Surendranath.

He also directed the 2001 romantic comedy film Love You Hamesha, featuring music composed by A. R. Rahman.

== Early life and background ==
Surendranath was born and brought up in Bombay, India (now Mumbai). From 1970 to 1974, he pursued higher education at St. Xavier's College, Mumbai, graduating with a Bachelor of Science in Physics and Mathematics.

His father, Surendra, is a singer and actor from the Golden Age of Indian cinema appearing in numerous Bollywood classics.

== Career ==
Surendranath began working in filmmaking and advertising at the age of 17. In a 1976 India Today feature titled “Hustler at Home,” he reported having completed approximately 30 advertisement films by the age of 26, including the national integration short film Sita Salim, left college to pursue advertising full-time and had proved a reputation in the industry prior to 1975.

=== Advertisements ===
==== Liril (Early 1970s) ====
In the early 1970s, Kailash Surendranath directed one of India's most well-known television advertisements—the Liril soap commercial for Hindustan Unilever. The ad featured Karen Lunel under a waterfall, symbolizing freshness and freedom, was shot across multiple locations including Tiger Falls in Kodaikanal, Ooty, and Khandala. These visuals, set to a memorable jingle, introduced a bold aesthetic that departed from more conventional-branded storytelling of the time. The commercial also helped establish Surendranath's reputation in the advertising industry.

==== Britannia Glucose-D (1976) ====
In 1976, Surendranath directed a Britannia Glucose-D commercial featuring Amjad Khan, famously known for his role as Gabbar Singh, a popular Bollywood villain. This advertisement was Khan's first commercial, marking a significant moment in Indian advertising history and highlighting the early use of celebrities to endorse products.

==== Nirma (1980s) ====
In the early 1980s, following an initial advertisement by filmmaker Subhash Ghai, Surendranath supervised and directed a series of Nirma washing powder commercials. These advertisements featured the widely recognized "Washing Powder Nirma" jingle and promoted the product's affordability and cleaning effectiveness. The early version of the advertisement featured one of the top actresses of the time, Sangeeta Bijlani. The campaign coincided with the brand's rise in popularity by 1985.

In the late 1990s, he directed Nirma Beauty Soap commercials starring actress Sonali Bendre, with a jingle sung by Hariharan and Kavita Krishnamurthy. Running on cinema and TV for 12 years from 1997 to 2009, it became one of Nirma's most successful campaigns.

Sunsilk (Early 1980s)

Surendranath directed a Sunsilk commercial featuring Aarti Gupta Surendranath, which was her first advertising appearance. She was selected from a group of models while still in school at the age of 15. The film was shot and directed by Surendranath in Kodaikanal, and went on to become a memorable hair commercial of its time.

Campa Cola (1983)

For the 1983, Campa Cola advertisement, Kailash Surendranath directed the commercial that marked the first on-screen appearance of Salman Khan. The advertisement also featured his then fiancé, Aarti Gupta Surendranath, who was already an established model. According to Aarti Gupta Surendranath, she noticed the teenage Salman Khan at the Sea Rock Club swimming pool and recommended him to Kailash Surendranath, who was seeking strong swimmers for the advertisement. Khan was subsequently cast in the commercial, which was filmed in the Andaman Islands and marked Khan's screen debut.

Thums Up (1985)

In 1978, Surendranath directed one of India's earliest commercial that featured celebrity cricketers for the brand Thums Up. The ad included players Sunil Gavaskar, Ravi Shastri, and Sandeep Patil. In the advertisement, the three cricketers are shown juggling a cricket ball, a Thums Up bottle, and a bottle opener.

Vimal Fabrics (Late 1980s - Early 2000s)

Surendranath directed several television commercials for Reliance Industries' textile brand, Vimal Fabrics. The advertisements featured the "Only Vimal" tagline and jingle, which became widely recognized in Indian advertising.

Cinthol (1993)

In the 1990s, Surendranath directed a Cinthol commercial featuring Shah Rukh Khan and Gauri Khan. The advertisement became popular for Shah Rukh Khan's playful line, “Phir se shaadi kar lein?”, delivered after using the soap and feeling refreshed enough to want to marry Gauri all over again. The film is notable as one of the early joint television appearances of the couple together.

Amul (2000s)

Surendranath worked on several campaigns for Amul, including giving the iconic Amul Girl an animated on-screen avatar. These films were created in collaboration with Rahul da Cunha, continuing Amul's long-standing advertising legacy.

==== Other advertisements ====
Throughout his career, Surendranath directed advertisements for several major Indian brands.

=== National Integration Films ===
==== Sita Aur Saleem (1970s) ====
Surendranath directed Sita Aur Saleem, a national integration film produced for the Films Division of India. The film focused on social themes related to national unity and was recognized within film circles for its thematic emphasis on social issues.

==== Spread the Light of Freedom (1984) ====
Surendranath directed Spread the Light of Freedom, also known as Freedom Run, the first film in a trilogy conceived to promoting national unity. The film's cast featured prominent Indian sports personalities representing a wide range of disciplines and regions across India.

The film's soundtrack was composed by Louis Banks and included a partial rendition of India’s national anthem. This inclusion initially faced resistance from Doordarshan. However, then-Prime Minister Rajiv Gandhi approved its use.

==== Mile Sur Mera Tumhara (1986) ====
In 1986, Surendranath conceptualised and produced Mile Sur Mera Tumhara, a landmark music video, aimed at showcasing India's cultural and linguistic diversity. Created in collaboration with Suresh Mullick and his team, the project presented a single song performed in multiple Indian languages and featured participation from a wide cross-section of prominent public figures drawn from cinema, music, literature, sports, and the arts.

The soundtrack, composed by Louis Banks, incorporated elements of Hindustani classical music and was adapted into various regional languages, with distinct musical arrangements created for each language. Surendranath proposed incorporating strains of the national anthem, which was initially met with reservations from Doordarshan but later approved by Prime Minister Rajiv Gandhi.

Surendranath and his team encountered challenges assembling the personalities, as some were unavailable. Yet, many agreed to participate due to the success of Spread the Light of Freedom in the previous year. Upon its release on Independence Day, the film garnered widespread attention. It has been often described in Indian media as “India's second national anthem,” and is regarded as a prominent cultural work associated with national integration.

==== Desh Raag (1988) ====
The final film in the trilogy, Desh Raag, focused on India's classical music and dance heritage. Conceived as part of the trilogy's broader aim to promote national unity, the production featured an ensemble of leading practitioners from Indian classical music traditions as well as multiple classical and folk dance forms, and was broadcast on Doordarshan.

As the trilogy films was produced in the pre-internet era, it required extensive coordination through letters and trunk calls to bring together the diverse cast across India.

==== Phir Mile Sur Mera Tumhara (2010) ====
In 2010, Kailash Surendranath directed Phir Mile Sur Mera Tumhara, a remake of the original Mile Sur Mera Tumhara. The film premiered on 26 January 2010 on Zoom TV to mark the 20th year of the original, which was also directed by Surendranath. He again collaborated with music composer Louis Banks, continuing the partnership that shaped the well-known music of the 1988 production.

The new version extended the format to over sixteen minutes and incorporated a wider range of contemporary musical elements, including artists playing instruments such as the fingerboard and violin. It adopted a more modern visual and musical approach intended to resonate with younger audiences while maintaining and reintroducing the essence of the original. The production featured a variety of recognised artists and celebrities, including musicians, performers from different creative fields, as well as sportspersons from multiple disciplines. The film also included a segment in Indian Sign Language, reflecting Surendranath's continued emphasis on inclusivity and national pride, consistent with the spirit of the earlier version.

==== Har Ghar Tiranga Campaign (2022) ====
In 2022, Surendranath was commissioned by the Ministry of Culture to direct a film for Har Ghar Tiranga, a national campaign launched under Azadi Ka Amrit Mahotsav, to commemorate 75 years of the country's independence. The film encouraged citizens to hoist the national flag on their homes, vehicles, and public spaces.

The film was co-directed by his son, Angadveer Surendranath, and produced by Aarti Surendranath. It was released around India's Independence Day, the film was supported by the Ministry of Culture through access and key permissions for important locations and featured participation from prominent public personalities across cinema, sports, and other fields.

=== Early Career Appearances ===
Surendranath has been involved in launching early careers in the Indian entertainment and advertising industries. Several actors appeared on screen for the first time under Surendranath's direction. Notably, Salman Khan featured in a Campa Cola advertisement in the early 1980s, one of his earliest roles prior to entering Indian cinema. Jackie Shroff featured in a Cadbury Drinking Chocolate ad, Arjun Rampal appeared in a denim campaign, and Aishwarya Rai starred in a fairness cream commercial alongside Mahima Chaudhry.

Additionally, Surendranath provided early industry exposure to Ekta Kapoor, who interned with him at the age of 15, gaining experience in filmmaking and advertising. This internship preceded her later work at Balaji Telefilms.

== Personal life ==
Kailash Surendranath is married to Aarti Gupta Surendranath, a former model and actress, who later worked alongside him as a producer after their marriage in 1985. She has also been involved in animal welfare, environmental advocacy, and event organisation. They have two children: their son, Angadveer Surendranath, is a director who co-directed the Har Ghar Tiranga campaign and worked on the Bollywood film Race 3 and their daughter, Kshiraja Surendranath, is a classical Odissi dancer.
