= Mile Sur Mera Tumhara =

1988 song short film

Song by Various
- Language: Assamese, Bengali, Gujarati, Hindi, Kannada, Kashmiri, Malayalam, Marathi, Odia, Punjabi, Sindhi, Tamil, Telugu, Urdu
- Released: 15 August 1988
- Recorded: 1988
- Composer: Bhimsen Joshi
- Lyricist: Piyush Pandey
- Producers: Kona Prabhakar Rao, Aarti Gupta Surendranath & Kailash Surendranath with Lok Seva Sanchar Parishad, India

"Ek Sur" (transl. One tune) or "Mile Sur Mera Tumhara" (transl. "As our tune(s) merge together") as it is better known, is an Indian song and accompanying video promoting national integration and unity in diversity.

The concept for Mile Sur was developed in 1988 by Lok Seva Sanchar Parishad and promoted by Doordarshan (then India's sole TV broadcaster) and India's Ministry of Information. The song was composed by Bhimsen Joshi and arranged by Louis Banks, with lyrics by Piyush Pandey (then an account manager and later, Chief Creative Officer Worldwide and Executive Chairman India of Ogilvy). The project was conceived by Suresh Mallik and Kailash Surendranath, was directed by Surendranath and recorded by people from all walks of life, including a supergroup of Indian celebrities—musicians, sports persons, movie actors.

The national integration video was intended to instill a sense of pride and promote unity amongst Indians, highlighting India's different linguistic communities and societies—India's unity in diversity, so to speak.

Mile Sur was telecast for the first time on Independence Day, 1988, after the telecast of the Prime Minister's speech from the ramparts of the Red Fort.

Roughly 32 years since its release, the song was remade by composer duo Sachin Sanghvi and Jigar Saraiya, with Saraiya also writing the lyrics to the new version, for the soundtrack of the 2020 film Street Dancer 3D.

== Languages featured ==
Hindi (Bhimsen Joshi and Lata Mangeshkar's parts, among others), and chronologically, the others were: Kashmiri, Punjabi, Sindhi, Urdu, Tamil, Kannada, Telugu, Malayalam, Bangla, Assamese, Odia, Gujarati and Marathi. (These were among the languages, then in 1988, in the Eighth Schedule of the Constitution of India.)

== Cast ==
- Singers and musicians: Pandit Bhimsen Joshi, Vidwaan Sri M Balamuralikrishna, Lata Mangeshkar, Kavita Krishnamurthy, Shubhangi Bose, Suchitra Mitra, R A Rama Mani, Ananda Shankar, Poornima
- Poets: Nirendranath Chakravarty, Sunil Gangopadhyay, Javed Akhtar
- Actors: Kamal Haasan, Amitabh Bachchan, Jeetendra, Mithun Chakraborty, Sharmila Tagore, Hema Malini, Tanuja, Meenakshi Seshadri, Saira Banu, Revathi, K.R. Vijaya, Waheeda Rehman, Shabana Azmi, Deepa Sahi, Om Puri, Bhisham Sahni, Amrish Puri, Dina Pathak, Harish Patel, Virendra Saxena, Uttam Mohanty, Pratap Pothen, Geetanjali
- Cricketers: Narendra Hirwani, Erapalli Prasanna, Arun Lal, Diana Edulji
- Footballers: Pradip Kumar Banerjee, Chuni Goswami
- Hockey-Players: Leslie Claudius, Gurbux Singh
- Badminton-Player: Prakash Padukone
- Basketball-Player: Gulam Abbas Moontasir
- Dancers: Sudharani Raghupathy, Amala Shankar, Mallika Sarabhai, Sathyanarayana Raju
- Others: cartoonist Mario Miranda, filmmaker Mrinal Sen, architect Kalpana Kuttaiah, Bansi Maneyapanda from Coorg, television host A. V. Ramanan

== Production ==
It is widely reported that the idea for the song was formed by Rajiv Gandhi, Kona Prabhakar Rao and Jaideep Samarth, who was the brother of actresses Tanuja and Nutan and a senior executive at Ogilvy Bensom & Mather (OBM). Samarth approached Suresh Mullick with the proposal made by Doordarshan to create a film on the unity of India with a planned release date of 15 August 1988. Mullick had previously worked with Kailash Surendranath on the successful national integration film of 1985, Torch of Freedom (or Freedom Run), and thus chose him to produce the film. Mullick and Surendranath then approached Pandit Bhimsen Joshi who immediately agreed. Mullick decided to fuse together Carnatic and Hindustani classical music with modern music for the same, choosing Raga Bhairavi as the base (as per Pandit Joshi's suggestion). The lyrics were written by a young Piyush Pandey and were approved after seventeen other drafts were rejected. Mullick chose Louis Banks and L Vaidyanathan to blend the music correctly and arrange the final score, which was sung by M Balamuralikrishna, Pandit Joshi and Lata Mangeshkar.

Producer and director Kailash Surendranath filmed the opening sequence with Pandit Bhimsen Joshi at Pambar Falls in Kodaikanal, where Surendranath had previously filmed a famous ad for Liril soap (leading to the falls being known popularly as "Liril Falls"). With the help of an Air Marshal and an IAF helicopter, he shot the aerial view of the Taj Mahal. This led both Surendranath and the Air Marshal into trouble. The video also features the Kolkata Metro and the Deccan Queen. Kamal Hassan's cameo was initially unplanned but he was included only because he accompanied M Balamuralikrishna for the shooting at the beach. At the request of Doordarshan, many actors agreed to be a part of the film, with only Naseeruddin Shah declining. While Kavita Krishnamurthy had recorded most of the initial track for the actresses to lip sync, Lata Mangeshkar made time in her schedule at the last minute and recorded the song in the studio, wearing a sari with a pallu (transl. drape) in the colours of the Indian flag. The last shot of the film, featuring school children, was filmed at Mullick's alma mater in Shimla.

== Phir Mile Sur Mera Tumhara ==
Twenty years after the tune's debut, it was re-recorded with an updated cast for telecast on 26 January 2010 by Zoom TV. This version, titled "Phir Mile Sur Mera Tumhara", features Indian musicians, singers, sportspersons and film personalities from the current generation. The current version's 16 min 17 sec length exceeds the older 6 min 9 sec version and was directed by Kailash Surendranath who had produced the original version as well. The new version retains music composer/arranger Louis Banks. It attracted criticism in a large part of the population among them were the Sindhi community which were upset over the deletion of the Sindhi lines "Muhinjo sur tuhinje saan pyara mile jadein, geet asaanjo madhur tarano bane tadein" present in the original. Further criticism arose over the omission of notable personalities such as, A.P.J. Abdul Kalam, Sachin Tendulkar and Viswanathan Anand. It was also criticized for its failure to capture the soul and essence of the original version, focusing excessively on Bollywood actors, ignoring eminent personalities in other fields.

The new version featured the following people:

- Musicians: A. R. Rahman, Shankar–Ehsaan–Loy, Anoushka Shankar, Shivkumar Sharma, Rahul Sharma, Zakir Hussain, Bhupen Hazarika, Sivamani, L. Subramaniam, Amjad Ali Khan, Amaan Ali Khan, Ayaan Ali Khan, Louis Banks, Darshan Doshi, Siddharth Mahadevan
- Singers: Shreya Ghoshal, Gurdas Maan, Shaan, Kavita Krishnamurthy, K. J. Yesudas, Vijay Yesudas, Sonu Nigam, Karthik (singer), N. C. Karunya
- Actors: Suriya, Amitabh Bachchan, Vikram, Aishwarya Rai Bachchan, Abhishek Bachchan, Mahesh Babu, Juhi Chawla, Prosenjit Chatterjee, Rituparna Sengupta, Shilpa Shetty, Salman Khan, Deepika Padukone, Priyanka Chopra, Mammootty, Shobana, Sonali Kulkarni, Atul Kulkarni, Aamir Khan, Shahid Kapoor, Ranbir Kapoor, Shah Rukh Khan.
- Sportspeople: Abhinav Bindra, Bhaichung Bhutia, Mary Kom, Vijender Singh, Sushil Kumar, Pullela Gopichand, Saina Nehwal
- Others: Sand artist Sudarshan Pattnaik, choreographer Shiamak Davar, film director Karan Johar
