= Panna-Mukta oilfield =

Oilfield in India

Panna-Mukta
- Location within India
- Country: India
- Region: Gulf of Khambhat
- Location: off the coast of Mumbai
- Offshore/onshore: Offshore
- Coordinates: 19.362976°N 71.941223°E
- Operators: Reliance Industries, BG Group, ONGC

Production
- Current production of oil: 19,000 barrels per day (~9.5×10^{5} t/a)
- Year of current production of oil: 2016
- Current production of gas: 205×10^{6} cu ft/d (5.8×10^{6} m^{3}/d)
- Year of current production of gas: 2010
- Estimated oil in place: 287 million barrels (~3.92×10^{7} t)

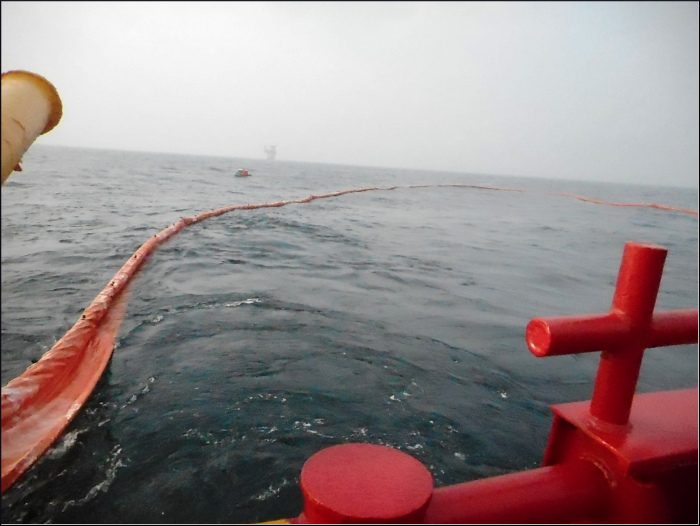
View from the ONGC oil platform Heera, located about 40 nautical miles west of Mumbai harbour, in the Heera–Panna oilfield.

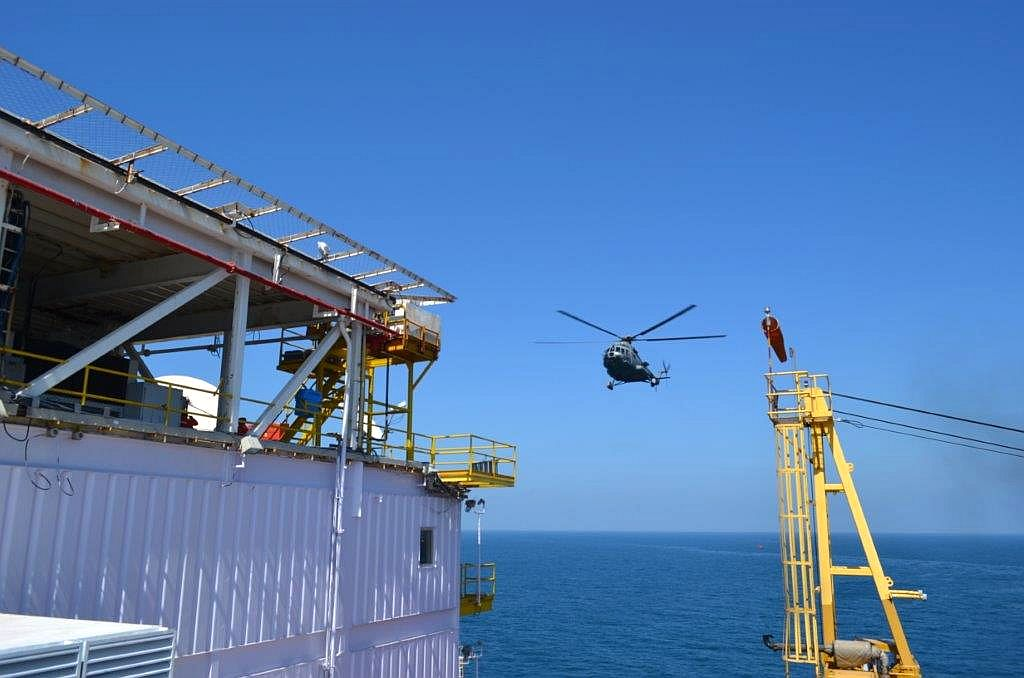
An Indian Air Force Mil Mi-17 helicopter approaching an oil rig in the Panna oilfield, approximately 100 km southwest of Mumbai.

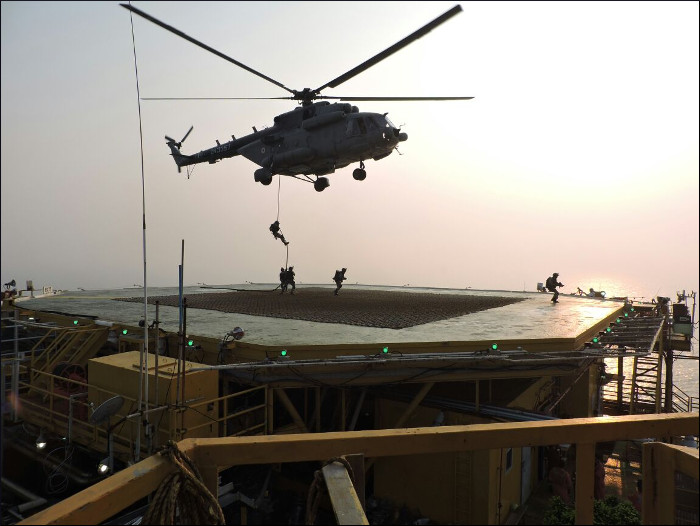
MARCOS descend from a helicopter onto the ONGC oil platform Heera during an exercise Prasthan 2017.

The Panna-Mukta oilfield consists of two contiguous offshore oil fields to the northwest of Mumbai, India.

== Location ==
The Panna field is 95 kilometres (59 mi) northwest of Mumbai, and has an area of 430 square kilometres (170 sq mi). It is just north of the Bassein gas field and about 50 kilometres (31 mi) east of the Bombay High oilfield. The Mukta field is about 100 kilometres (62 mi) northwest of Mumbai, and has an area of 777 square kilometres (300 sq mi). Average water depth is 45 metres (148 ft) in the Panna field and 65 metres (213 ft) in the Mukta field. As of May 1999 estimated recoverable reserves of oil were 287 million barrels. Source rock is of Panna Formation

== Ownership ==
The Panna-Mukta oil field and the Tapti gas field to the north were discovered by the Indian state-owned Oil and Natural Gas Corporation (ONGC), who initially operated the fields. Following a privatization policy a Reliance - Enron consortium gained a 25-year lease on the oil field in February 1994. Oil production at that time was 12,000 barrels per day. The lease was awarded under a production sharing arrangement. The Government of India would receive a variable share of profit depending on the investment multiple. In December 1994 a joint venture between ONGC (40%), Enron (30%) and Reliance (30%) took control of the field.

In 2002 British Gas (BG) bought Enron's 30% share of the Panna-Mukta and Tapti fields for $350 million. The other two stakeholders remained the ONGC with 40% and Reliance with 30%. Initially, BG continued as operator in place of Enron. However, there was a dispute between the partners over operation of the field, with BG wanting to control operations and the two Indian firms wanting a more equal sharing of control.

== Controversy ==
The contract was awarded during the tenure of Satish Sharma as petroleum minister. The Comptroller and Auditor General of India wrote a report that was highly critical of the contract award process. In December 1995 Y.P. Singh, a Superintendent of Police, investigated allegations on nepotism and submitted a detailed report. The Central Bureau of Investigation (CBI) registered a preliminary inquiry in June 1996. By August 1997 the CBI had yet to issue a report on the affair. An article in Outlook India that month reported that serious evidence of bribe-giving by companies looking for oil exploitation contracts had been submitted, but claimed that CBI was attempting a cover-up.

The Centre for Public Interest Litigation (CPIL) filed a petition for a judicial probe of the deal. In October 1997 the Delhi High Court heard the CPIL petition and issued notices to the involved companies and government organizations. The petition alleged that V P Singh's notes had been lost. Prashant Bhushan, advocate for CPIL, said: "If files are going to disappear like this, no investigation into criminal cases can be carried out". In May 1998 the CBI admitted that Y.P. Singh's case diary had indeed been lost and might have been deliberately destroyed. In response to a further CPIL petition the Supreme Court of India conducted a hearing into the affair, which concluded in August 2000.

In September 2010 the Comptroller and Auditor General of India found that the consortium running the fields had made excessive payments to service contractors, which could have cut into the profits that the government made from the fields.

== Development and production ==
The initial phase of development was from 1995 to 1999, during which the joint venture installed three wellhead platforms, drilled development wells and established facilities for processing and transport. In a subsequent phase between November 2004 and March 2007 the joint venture installed pipelines and two wellhead platforms in the Panna oilfield. As of 2006, production centered on the PPA facility, designed to handle 45,000 barrels (7,200 m^{3}) of oil per day and 90 million cubic feet (2.5 million cubic metres) per day at standard conditions of gas. Fluid from seven satellite platforms reaches PPA through subsea lines, where it is processed. Crude oil is loaded onto a tanker and gas is sent via a line to Hazira. The PPA can accommodate 75 workers.

In 1999 production was 27,000 barrels (4,300 m^{3}) of oil per day and 71 million ft^{3} (2.0 million m^{3}) per day of gas. As of 2006 the fields were producing 30,000 barrels (4,800 m^{3}) of oil per day and 90 million ft^{3} (2.5 million m^{3}) per day. As of 2008 the field was producing 40,000 barrels (6,400 m^{3}) of oil per day and 190 million ft^{3} (5.4 million m^{3}) per day of gas. All of the oil was being sold to Indian Oil and all the gas to GAIL India. On 3 June 2008 there was an explosion in which one worker was killed, forcing a temporary halt to production. As of July 2010 the field was producing about 35,000 barrels (5,600 m^{3}) of oil per day and 205 million ft^{3} (5.8 million m^{3}) per day of gas. On 20 July 2010 production was halted due to a leak in the sub-sea hose near the Panna single buoy mooring. Production could not be resumed until October that year.

In October 2008 it was reported that British Gas was waiting for approval of a US$150 million program to construct nine in fill wells. These would be used to pump water into the reservoir to maintain pressure and improve recovery. The joint venture had started to implement a program to drill nine more production wells and install two additional platforms, with the platforms being due for commissioning in June 2009. As of 2011 BG Group was continuing to incrementally develop the fields by well intervention, infill drilling and installation of new projects such as the recently installed Panna L.
