= Aniruddh Agarwal =

Indian actor (born 1949)

- Born: 20 December 1949 (age 76); Dehradun, United Provinces, India
- Occupation: Actor
- Years active: 1975–2010
- Height: 1.93 m (6 ft 4 in)

Aniruddh "Ajay" Agarwal (born 20 December 1949) is an Indian retired actor. He is known for his appearances in horror films such as Purana Mandir, Bandh Darwaza, and Saamri as well as starring in episodes of Zee Horror Show.

== Early life and education ==
During his school and college years, Agarwal was a sports ambassador. He studied Civil Engineering at the Indian Institute of Technology Roorkee, before graduating in 1974. He moved to Mumbai, where he initially started working as an engineer but quit his job to begin his acting career.

== Career ==
Due to his somewhat intimidating appearance, caused by a tumor near his pituitary gland, Agarwal starred in Hindi films and television as demonic/ghostly characters or villains in general. He most notably worked with the Ramsay brothers, first starring in their film Purana Mandir as Samri, then as the vampire Nevla in Bandh Darwaza and once again as Samri in Saamri. He also featured in two Hollywood films; playing a supporting antagonist in Stephen Sommers' 1994 live action adaptation of The Jungle Book and later briefly appearing in Such a Long Journey.

And in 1994, when he was approached by Shekhar Kapur for the role of Babu Gujjar in Bandit Queen, it was a defining moment as he got the right opportunity to demonstrate his versatility as an artist. He later joined hands with his friends Aamir Khan for Mela in 2000 and with Akshay Kumar for Talash: The Hunt Begins in 2003.

Following a cameo in Mallika in 2010, Agarwal retired from acting due to film roles becoming scarce.

== Filmography ==
Year	Film	Role	Notes
1982	Teri Maang Sitaron Se Bhar Doon		
1984	Purana Mandir	Samri	
1984	Awaaz	Malhotra's Henchman	
1985	3D Saamri	Dharmesh Saxena 'Samri'	
1986	Allah Rakha	Gorilla fighter	
1986	Avinash	Pratap's Henchman	
1988	Kasam		
1988	Mar Mitenge		
1989	Jaadugar		
1989	Ram Lakhan	Jeeva	
1990	Tum Mere Ho	Kaalu Sapera	
1990	Bandh Darwaza	Nevla	
1990	Aaj Ka Arjun		
1992	Tahalka	Dong's Henchman	
1993	Gopalaa	Vikraal, Prisoner in Jail	
1994	Bandit Queen	Babu Gurjjar	
1994	The Jungle Book	Tabaqui	English film
1995	Trimurti	Talaf	
1998	Such a Long Journey		English film
1999	Dulhan Bani Daayan	Not known	
2000	Mela	Kaali	
2003	Talaash: The Hunt Begins	Passenger on Train	
2003	Palanati Brahmanaidu		Telugu film
2007	Journey Bombay to Goa Laughter Unlimited	Junglee	
2010	Mallika	Samri	
2010	Bachao: Inside Bhoot Hai		

=== Television ===
- Zee Horror Show (1993)
- Tu Tu Main Main (1994)
- Mano Ya Na Mano (1995)
- Shaktimaan (1997)
- Hudd Kar Di (1999)
