= Francesca Fusco =

American dermatologist

- Born: August 17, 1958 (age 68)
- Education: New York Medical College
- Medical career
- Field: Dermatology
- Institutions: New York Medical College

Francesca J. Fusco (born August 17, 1958) is an American dermatologist based in New York City who specializes in dermatologic surgery, and hair and scalp care. Fusco is part of a growing trend, according to the New York Observer, of female dermatologists who also "serve as 'faces' of the treatments they peddle."

== Early life and education ==
She graduated with a medical degree from New York Medical College in 1985, completed an internship in pediatrics at the St. Vincent's Medical Center in New York City. She was trained in dermatology at Westchester Medical Center. She is also professor at New York Medical School. She followed by a three-year residency in dermatology in which she served as chief resident. She has been a dermatologist in New York since 1989.

== Career ==
Fusco has worked as a resident dermatologist at Wexler Dermatology in New York City. She is a member of the American Academy of Dermatology and the American Academy of Cosmetic Surgery, a member of the American Society for Laser Medicine and Surgery, the American Society for Dermatologic Surgery.

She has appeared in several programs of media experts, including CNN, Eyewitness News, CBS News, Fox News and The Today Show. She has criticised various products to treat cellulite, saying "everyone wants an easy answer for it…but there is no magic cream."

Fusco advocates adding a spoonful of sugar to shampoo, claiming the mix will "gently exfoliate and completely dissolve, without leaving behind any grit or particles". She recommends periodic detoxification of the scalp.

== Product co-creations ==
Fusco worked with Unilever brand, Sunsilk, as a product co-creator. She is the brand's hair fall solutions expert.
