= Purana Mandir =

1984 Indian Hindi-language horror film

- Theatrical release poster
- Directed by: Tulsi Ramsay; Shyam Ramsay
- Written by: J. K. Ahuja (story); Kumar Ramsay (screenplay)
- Produced by: Kanta Ramsay
- Starring: Mohnish Behl; Puneet Issar; Aarti Gupta; Sadashiv Amrapurkar; Pradeep Kumar; Trilok Kapoor; Anirudh Agarwal
- Music by: Ajit Singh (soundtrack)
- Production company: Ramsay Films
- Release date: 19 October 1984
- Running time: 138 minutes
- Language: Hindi
- Budget: ₹2.5 lakh
- Box office: ₹2.5 crore

Purana Mandir (transl. The Old Temple) is a 1984 Indian Hindi-language horror film directed by the Ramsay brothers and produced by Kanta Ramsay. The soundtrack was composed by Ajit Singh.

Typical of Ramsay's other works, the film chronicles the story of a demonic magician Samri who after a violent standoff, curses a king that every female member of the latter's family would die at childbirth.

== Plot ==
The film opens 200 years ago, with the royal procession of Raja Harimaan Singh of the sultanate of Bijapur, stranded near the Kali Pahari (the Black Mountain). The Raja is concerned because his daughter, Princess Rupali, has disappeared near the lair of the devil-worshipper Samri. The princess wanders into the ruins of an old fortress and is promptly captured by Samri. He attacks by mesmerising her, then sucking out her life-force which turns her eyes white. During this process, Samri's eyes gleam blood red. Raja Harimaan Singh catches Samri in this act and orders him captured.

Samri is put on trial, where his terrible litany of crimes is read. He has performed various heinous acts to please his demonic spirit masters and enhance his own evil powers. While the rajpurohit (royal priest) suggests Samri to be burned alive as it was believed that fire purifies the soul, the Raja proposes another sentence—Samri is to be decapitated, with the headless body to be buried behind the old temple at Kalighat and the head secured in a strong-box to be kept at a secret chamber in the Raja's haveli (mansion).

Samri casts a curse upon the Raja: "So long as my head is away from my body, every woman in your line shall die at childbirth; and when my head is rejoined to my body, I will arise and wipe out every living person in your dynasty."

Decades pass away and the princely states merge into the Indian republic after British Raj ends, and the great-great-grandson of Raja Harimaan Singh, Thakur Ranvir Singh, now resides in the city. Samri is long gone, but not forgotten. His evil legend is passed from father to son in the Harimaan Singh clan. Ranvir Singh's wife died during the birth of their daughter, Suman.

In the present day, Suman is a college student and has a boyfriend, Sanjay. When the Thakur learns about their relationship, he disapproves of their relationship, mainly because Sanjay is not of royal birth.

Suman is unaware of the ancient curse and resolute in her love, and Sanjay is steadfast in standing by her. They try to confront the intractable Thakur and the latter succumbs and reveals the curse which has been terrorising their families for 200 years. Suman leaves her home in the middle of the night and convinces Sanjay to accompany her to Bijapur. They are accompanied by Sanjay's friend Anand with and his girlfriend Sapna.

The haveli has a painting of Raja Harimaan Singh; this painting shifts its gaze when Suman looks at it; and the eerie likeness of Samri appears through it. Anand and Sanjay smash the wall behind the painting and uncover the strong box that holds Samri's head. Misinterpreting the head to be potentially that of a brave soldier who incurred the king's displeasure, they head back with the intention of sealing the wall the next day.

Sanga stumbles upon Samri's head while treasure-hunting in the mansion. The head mesmerises and puts Sanga into a trance, forcing him to bring the head to the body behind the old temple. The head rejoins the body in a gruesome ritual, making Samri whole. Samri begins his murderous rampage to eliminate the descendants of Raja Harimaan Singh.

Misunderstandings and tensions claim the lives of many townspeople and Anand and Sapna meet horrific deaths at the hands of Samri. Thakur Ranvir Singh arrives, but he does not know how to defeat the bloodthirsty Samri.

People seek refuge at the temple as Samri cannot enter that holy ground. They perform aarti to Lord Shiva. Divine guidance comes to Sanjay; the trishul holds the key to check the monster. Sanjay and Suman return to the haveli to seek the trishul and offer a battle to Samri. Durjan had moved the trishul to a different location within the haveli itself.

After a series of tumultuous events, Sanjay manages to trap Samri in a coffin and, with the trishul in hand to check the monster, drags him out to the village square (next to the old temple). There, they construct a hasty pyre and burn Samri alive once and for all. Then, Suman and Sanjay get married.

== Cast ==
- Mohnish Bahl as Sanjay
- Aarti Gupta as Suman Singh
- Pradeep Kumar as Thakur Ranvir Singh
- Puneet Issar as Anand
- Sadashiv Amrapurkar as Durjan
- Anirudh Agarwal as Samri
- Sadhana Khote as Sadhna Khote
- Trilok Kapoor as Raja Harimaan Singh
- Satish Shah as Sanga (the woodcutter)
- Jagdeep as Machhar Singh (Dacoit)
- Rajendra Nath as Thakur Murdaar Singh aka Thakur
- Lalita Pawar as Basanti
- Ashalata Wabgaonkar as Suman's maternal aunt
- Dheeraj Kumar as Raka
- Alka Nupur as Bijli

== Soundtrack ==
Soundtrack is produced by Sony Music India. The complete soundtrack is as follows:

Track listing
No.	Title	Singer(s)	Length
1.	"Hum Jis Pe Marte The"	Alka Yagnik	3:55
2.	"Shiv Shiv Shankar"	Mahendra Kapoor	3:42
3.	"Main Hoon Akeli Raat Jawan"	Asha Bhosle	3:24
4.	"Woh Beete Din Yaad Hai" (female version)	Asha Bhosle	6:11
5.	"Woh Beete Din Yaad Hai" (male version – part I)	Ajit Singh & Asha Bhosle	5:59
6.	"Woh Beete Din Yaad Hai" (male version – part II)	Ajit Singh	1:09

== Box office ==
Made on a budget of ₹2.5 lakh, Purana Mandir collected a total gross of ₹2.5 crore. It was a successful at the box office. It stood the second-highest film after 1984's Sharaabi.

== Home media ==
Purana Mandir was released on DVD by Mondo Macabro as a double feature with the 1990 film Bandh Darwaza (also directed by the Ramsay brothers), as the Bollywood Horror Collection Vol. 1. In 2023, Mondo Macabro released Purana Mandir on Blu-ray as part of the Bollywood Horror Collection boxed set, which also includes the Ramsay brothers-directed films Aatma (2006), Bandh Darwaza, Purani Haveli (1989), Tahkhana (1986), and Veerana (1988).
