= Lead India =

- A promotional image of "Lead India".
- Created by: Miditech Pvt. Ltd.
- Presented by: Anupam Kher
- Opening theme: "Lead India" by ??
- Country of origin: India
- No. of seasons: 1

Production
- Running time: approx. 52 minutes

Original release
- Network: STAR One
- Release: 8 December 2007 – 9 February 2008

Lead India is an Indian television initiative launched on India's 60th Independence Day by The Times of India Group. Hosted by Anupam Kher, the program aired on STAR One every Saturday evening. Citizens of India aged between 25 and 45 could participate in the three-stage contest, for which the winner would be a contender for participating in India's next assembly elections, a place on the leadership and politics course at Harvard University, and a grant of Rs 50 lakh for pursuing a public welfare project of the winner's choice.

Lead India was the sequel to the newspaper's earlier "India Poised" initiative launched in January 2007. "India Poised" aimed to promote India's recent successes and its growing international importance, and also conducted a critical assessment of sectors where India needed improvement, with public governance at the top of the latter list. Lead India therefore aimed to address that concern by offering the winner an entry to active politics without a long path up the political ladder.

A program with a similar name was also launched, much before The Times of India's Lead India campaign, by Dr. A. P. J. Abdul Kalam, the then President of India, in the early 2000s.

In an episode telecast on 22 December 2007, Kumaramangalam Birla and Akshay Kumar joined the jury as celebrity judges. Saumya Mishra left the contest for personal reasons.

In the United States and Canada, the show aired on STAR One every Saturday evening.

== Finalists ==
Since 8 December 2007 eight Lead India finalists have competed to decide the national winner:

- Saumya Mishra - Hyderabad
- Sanjiv Kaura - Delhi
- Dipayan Dey - Kolkata
- Ujjawal Banerjee - Mumbai
- Ranjit Gadgil - Pune
- Devang Nanavati - Ahmedabad (Runner up)
- R. K. Misra - Bengaluru (Winner)
- Abha Singh - Lucknow

On 9 February 2008, the results were announced. R.K.Misra (Bangalore) won the contest against Devang Nanavati of Ahmedabad, with more votes and a lead of 6-1 from the jury of seven judges. He was crowned as Lead India "Mahanayak" by Abdul Kalam, the former president of India.

Later on one of the finalists, Sanjiv Kaura, became the CEO of CSR for Times of India Group. Along with the British Council, the group launched the Teach India Program.

A "Lead India Video Contest" was also held. The winners were declared as Jyotsna Khatry, Ashwani Thakur, and Achin Jain as 1st, 2nd, 3rd respectively. Awards were declared on the Times of India website. Videos made by the winners were posted to YouTube.

There were three members of the jury:

- Javed Akhtar
- Kiran Bedi
- Vikas Singh
