= Jeevante Jeevan =

- Official poster
- Directed by: J. Williams
- Written by: J. Williams; M. R. Jose (dialogues)
- Story by: J. Williams
- Starring: Mohanlal; Maniyanpilla Raju; Prathapachandran; Aarti Gupta Surendranath
- Cinematography: J. Williams
- Edited by: K. Sankunni
- Music by: Shyam
- Production company: Dhanya Films
- Distributed by: Dhanasree Films; K. K. Release
- Release date: 7 May 1985
- Country: India
- Language: Malayalam

Jeevante Jeevan is a 1985 Indian Malayalam-language film written and directed by J. Williams. The film stars Mohanlal, Maniyanpilla Raju, Prathapachandran and Aarti Gupta in the lead roles. The film has musical score by Shyam.

== Cast ==
- Mohanlal as Jayan, a widower
- Shalini Kumar as Biju (Jayan's son)
- Aarti Gupta Surendranath
- Sharat Saxena as a boxer
- Balan K. Nair as Pathmanabhan Thambi
- Kuthiravattam Pappu as Peter (Jayan's friend)
- Maniyanpilla Raju as Prakash
- T. G. Ravi as Police officer Zachariah
- C. I. Paul as Hari Master
- Prathapachandran
- Pattom Sadhan
- Bob Christo as Boxer Bob Christo
- Manik Irani as Chandran
- Rani Padmini as Stella
- Lalithasree as Mummy
- Silk Smitha
- Anuradha as Item dancer

== Soundtrack ==
The music was composed by Shyam and the lyrics were written by Poovachal Khader.

No.	Song	Singers	Lyrics	Length
1	"En karalil Nilaavin Hamsangal"	K. J. Yesudas, S. Janaki	Poovachal Khader	
2	"Kandaalumen Priyane"	S. Janaki	Poovachal Khader	
3	"Nirave Niravadyathe"	S. P. Sailaja	Poovachal Khader	
4	"Oru Loka Sanchaaram"	K. J. Yesudas	Poovachal Khader	
