= Mallika (2010 film) =

- Promotional poster
- Directed by: Wilson Louis
- Written by: Mohan Savalkar
- Produced by: Wilson Louis
- Starring: Sameer Dattani; Himanshu Malik; Suresh Menon; Sheena Nayar; Pooja Ballutia; Rajesh Khera; Arjun Mahajan; Farzil Pardiwalla; Mamik Singh
- Cinematography: Viraj Sinha
- Music by: Songs: Pritam; Akbar Sami; Score: Shamir Tandon
- Production company: Glorious Entertainment
- Distributed by: PPC Horrotainment
- Release date: 3 September 2010
- Country: India
- Language: Hindi

Mallika is a Hindi horror film, produced and directed by Wilson Louis. The film was released on 3 September 2010 under the Glorious Entertainment banner.

== Plot ==
Whenever she closes her eyes, all Sanjana sees is a ghost staring at her in various states of blood and gore, often prompting her to be scared all the time. When she awakens, she can see them lying by her side.

Unable to sleep, she sees visions of a desolate mansion where she sees a swinging chair and most particularly about a storeroom. In one vision, she sees herself in a forest while being at home, where she follows the woman in white whom she sees as herself. After she is standing just a few feet away, the ghost kills her with a dagger, and the vision ends. Then, she decides to go to the mansion with her friends and boyfriend, who mostly plays a violin.

There, a series of mysterious murders start to happen with her friends, with no clue over who did it. Then, Sanjana gets her most powerful vision, where she sees the entire murder process that occurred before they even got there.

They seek the help of a Hindu priest, who after listening to her claims, researches and finds out about the murder. It is revealed that the ghost is none other than the owner of the mansion, "Mallika." And the murderer, Mallika's husband, who was cheating with some other girl and reveals that he married her for her property, soon left India after taking possession of the property.

Meanwhile, it was believed that Sanjana was the medium through which the murders occurred, as she is a lookalike of Mallika. The priest finds out that Sanjana is not the medium, so they decide to perform a ritual to find out about the medium.

In the middle sequence of the ritual, the vengeful ghost of Mallika appears and kills the priest. Then, Mallika's husband "Kaushik" comes to the mansion and sees Sanjana and takes her for Mallika. He says that he can kill another time too. There, he hears the violin tunes of Sanjana's boyfriend, which are the same tunes as of Mallika. Then he shows a ghostly face, proving that he is Mallika's medium. Flashback reveals that he was the one who pulled out the blood-stained dagger from its resting place. And was cut in the fingertip with her blood entering his body. After some time, he was fully possessed. He tortures Kaushik, and Mallika leaves his body to kill him inside her dying place.

The hauntings and killings soon begin ending. And there is a hint for a happy ending.

== Cast ==
- Sameer Dattani as Saahil
- Himanshu Malik as Vikram
- Rajesh Khera as Chandar
- Suresh Menon as Inspector P K Girpade
- Mamik Singh as Mr. Kaushik
- Bikramjeet Kanwarpal
- Sheena Nayar as Sanjana/Mallika
- Pooja Ballutia as Maya
- Arjun Mahajan as Maddy
- Farzil Pardiwalla as Bhim Singh
- Anirudh Agarwal as Samri

== Music ==
Mallika

Soundtrack album by Pritam
- Released: 3 September 2010
- Genre: filmi
- Producer: Pritam

Pritam chronology
Hello Darling (2010)	Mallika (2010)	Crook (2010)

All lyrics are written by Sudhakar Sharma; all music is composed by Pritam, Shamir Tandon & Akbar Sami.

No.	Title	Music	Singer(s)	Length
1.	"Chaahoon Tujhe"	Pritam	Sunidhi Chauhan, KK
2.	"Ittefaq Tu Nahi" (Rock Version)	Shamir Tandon	Raaj, Shilpa Rao
3.	"Ittefaq Tu Nahi" (Sensuous Version)	Shamir Tandon	Raaj, Shilpa Rao
4.	"Shah-e-Khuban"	Shamir Tandon	Amjad, Neeti Mohan
5.	"Woh Bhooli Dastan" (Dance Mix)	Akbar Sami	Pamela Jain
6.	"Woh Bhooli Dastan" (Radio Mix)	Akbar Sami	Pamela Jain
