= Yogesh Pratap Singh =

Indian polymath

- Born: 1959 (age 66–67)
- Occupations: Lawyer and activist
- Known for: Kya Yahi Sach Hai
- Spouse: Abha Singh
- Children: 2
- Website: ypsingh.com

Yogesh Pratap Singh (born 1959) is a former Indian police service officer who left to become a lawyer and activist in Mumbai. He directed the international award-winning film Kya Yahi Sach Hai (2010), a fictional account of corruption in the police force that is based on Singh's own experiences.

== Police officer ==
Y.P. Singh served as an officer of the Indian Police Service of the 1985 batch, Maharashtra Cadre. During his stint in the IPS he worked in various positions in the district police, the Food and Drugs Administration, the Central Bureau of Investigation (CBI) and the reserve police. Singh's first posting was in Wardha. There he developed a reputation for tough policing, conducting raids and clampdowns on a daily basis. During his stint in the CBI, he dealt with several high-profile cases like the Unit Trust of India US-64 scam. In December 1995 Singh, then a Superintendent of Police, investigated allegations of nepotism in the award of contracts for exploiting the Panna-Mukta oilfield and submitted a detailed report. However, the CBI dragged its heels on pursuing the investigation.

The police leadership at first commended Singh's efforts. Later, according to his account in an interview with Rediff, he ran into trouble because he was uncovering awkward facts that he would not cover up. In May 1998 the CBI admitted that Y.P. Singh's case diary had been lost and said it might have been deliberately destroyed. He was shunted to insignificant postings. Singh challenged these postings in the court, alleging that he was being targeted because of his investigations into the honest practices of senior officers and politicians. He lost his case in the lower courts, which upheld the Government's transfer order stating that it was a policy decision not to be interfered with by the courts. Singh appealed the judgment in the Supreme Court, where he subsequently won. He was reinstated in the Maharashtra Police and posted as Commandant of the State Reserve Police Force, Group 8.

== State Reserve Police Force ==
From 1998 to 2003, Singh was commandant of the Reserve Police Force in Goregaon (East). Heading Group 8 of the SRPF turned out to be a new experience for Mr. Singh. The entire unit (almost 600 men) were housed in a drab 136 acres (55 ha) campus which lacked modern amenities and enjoyed little or no funding from the State Government. Consequently, he took it upon himself and his men to improve the campus and set an example for other Reserve Police units to follow. Over the course of 4 years, starting in 1997, applying the concept of Shramdaan – that is donated labour from the men and inhabitants, tremendous infrastructure to support the welfare of constables was constructed.

To generate funds for such activities, Singh assumed the role of a corporate executive. The loss-making bakery on the Campus was shut down and replaced by two stores – one for vegetables and the other for groceries. Following the principles of organised retail and economies of scale, the stores started selling items at prices lesser than that of other retailers. They soon became a hit and were generating more than One Lakh Rupees per day in revenues. It was from these revenues that a 30 metres (98 ft) long swimming pool, a 400 metres (1,300 ft) long lake, a modern computer center and a host of other welfare facilities were set up for the benefit of the constables and their children.

== Comment on rape ==
After the Mumbai rape, he said 90 percent rape cases are false.

== Later career ==
In 2003 Singh released a novel named "Carnage by Angels" that exposed the rampant corruption and malpractices that go on in the police force. He had written the book while working as a junior IPS officer and was forced to quit after publication. Singh retired in February 2004 but refused to vacate his 750 sq ft flat at Nariman Point in Mumbai until November 2011. He gave as his reason the fact that the government did not pay his provident fund for 7 years. He became a lawyer and an activist. He practices as an Advocate in Mumbai, helps several NGOs on corruption-related and often lectures on corruption and the law.

In 2004 Singh released a second book named "Vultures in Love", a novel about corruption in the customs and income-tax departments. The film Kya Yahi Sach Hai based on Singh's first novel won a Silver Award in the Narrative Film Category of the California Film Awards in 2010. A critic said "'Kya Yahi Sach Hai' is a hard-hitting film arousing enormous emotions and reactions". It was publicly screened in Mumbai in December 2011 in an event attended by celebrities such as L. K. Advani, Nitin Gadkari, Maneka Gandhi, Vijay Goel, Anurag Thakur, Prakash Javadekar, Murli Deora, Rajeev Shukla and Jagdambika Pal. The cricket leader Mahendra Singh Dhoni helped launch the CD "Music Of 'Kya Yahi Sach Hai'". His film was pulled from the screen by a multiplex at Inox Nariman point. Singh claimed the reason was concern by the cinema that the police would retaliate by raising charges over statutory violations.

In February 2012 Y.P. Singh protested against extending the service of Municipal Commissioner Subodh Kumar, which he claimed was in violation of the rules regulating All India Service staff. He was also concerned that Subodh Kumar had in the past shown favour to a member of team of the anti-corruption campaigner Anna Hazare. The team was fielding candidates in by-elections, and there should be no doubt about the impartiality of the authorities.

He has been involved in fighting corruption cases like Adarsh Housing Society scam, the Powai land scam and Lavasa Township case in court.
