= Swar Dharohar Festival =

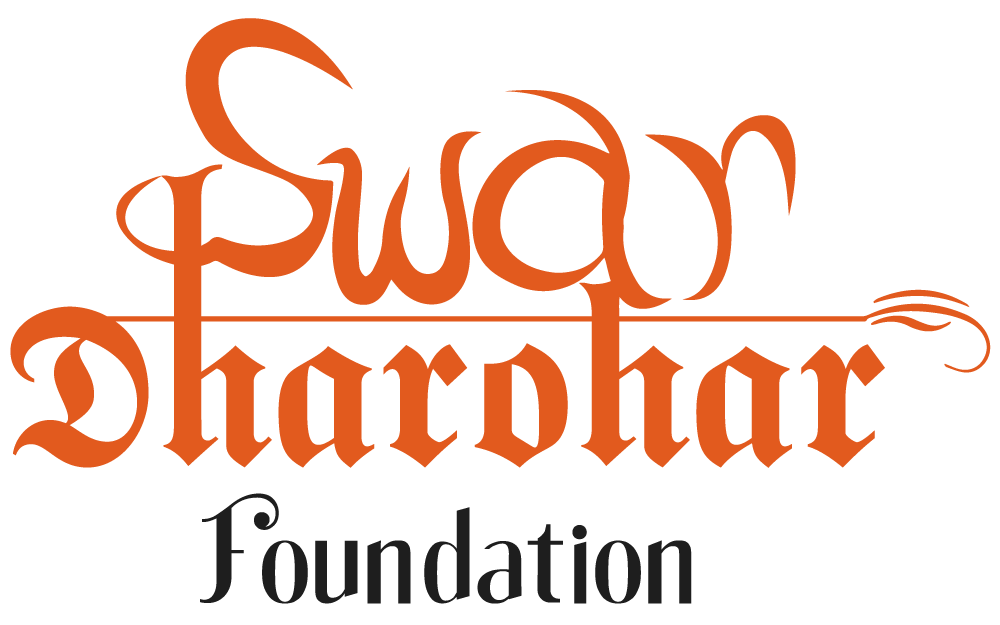
- Founder: GM Khan
- Type: NGO
- Purpose: Music and Cultural Festival
- Headquarters: New Delhi
- Website: https://swardharohar.org/

Swar Dharohar Festival (Hindi: स्वर धरोहर महोत्सव) is a celebration of music, art, and literature that highlights the rich cultural diversity and artistic legacy of India. As part of Azadi Ka Amrit Mahotsav, it has been organized by the Swar Dharohar Foundation in association with the Indian Ministry of Culture every year.

The festival aims to showcase a variety of Indian classical and Sufi music, both vocal and instrumental.

== History ==
The Swar Dharohar Foundation in Delhi launched the festival in 2003 to commemorate, protect, and advance India's rich cultural and creative legacy.

The foundation's primary goal is to uncover and give a platform to underappreciated artists and unsung champions in the field. Collaborations with nearby communities allow it to showcase the diversity of Indian culture. It was organised at India Gate in 2022 under the Kalanjali (an Amrit Mahotsav initiative).

The founder of the festival is GM Khan, and the director is Md Umar Kadri.

=== Notable participants ===
- Pandit Lalit Prasad (Classical vocalist)
- (Sufi music)
- Hamsar Hayat Nizami (Sufi music)
- Athar Hayat Nizami (Sufi music)
- Nooran Sisters
- Pandit Suvir Mishra
- Hans Raj Hans
- Shahid Anjum

== See also ==
- Azadi Ka Amrit Mahotsav
- Indian Culture
- Ministry of Culture (India)
