= Naya Safar =

- Starring: Javed Khan; Rajendra Nath; Kamini Kaushal
- Music by: Nadeem-Shravan
- Release date: 1982

Naya Safar is a 1982 Bollywood film where Javed Khan romances Arti Gupta Surendranath who is playing the female lead. Kamini Kaushal, Dev Kumar and Rajendranath play key supporting roles in the movie.

== Soundtrack ==
Lyrics: Surendra Sathi

| Song | Singer |
|---|---|
| "Kitni Nasheeli" | Anwar |
| "Mohe Kahan Tu" | Chetan |
| "Dekho Aaye" | Asha Bhosle |
| "Jane Kyun Log Mujhe" | Asha Bhosle, Usha Mangeshkar |
| "Jai Shiv Shankar" | Asha Bhosle |
| "Dil Se Door Jana Na" | Sapna Mukherjee, Anwar |
