= Kya Yahi Sach Hai =

- Directed by: Yogesh Pratap Singh
- Written by: Yogesh Pratap Singh
- Based on: novel 'Carnage by Angels'
- Starring: Ashok Kumar Beniwal, Gurpreet Kaur Chadha, Shalini Chandran
- Release date: 30 December 2011
- Country: India
- Language: Hindi

Kya Yahi Sach Hai is an international award-winning film directed by former IPS officer Yogesh Pratap Singh. The film is based on Mr. Singh's novel 'Carnage by Angels' which was released in 2003, which exposed the rampant corruption and malpractices that go on in the police force.

The film won the Silver Award in the Narrative Film Category of the California Film Awards in 2010 and the Best story award for Y. P. Singh in IRDS Film awards 2011 by Institute for Research and Documentation in Social Sciences (IRDS), a Lucknow-based Civil society for being a very genuine and truthful story about governance and policing.

Kya Yahi Sach Hai was released on 30 December 2011 in cinemas across India.

== Plot ==
Raghu Kumar is a young trainee Indian Police Service (IPS) officer. During the course of his training, he is being taught cycle patrolling in the streets when the head constable giving training comes out with certain startling revelations. This head constable gives an honest confession about his largely corrupt activities in the detection branch of Kotwali Police Station and how one incident changed his life, and which made him give up corruption and take to honesty.

Overwhelmed in emotions, this IPS officer and his wife resolve not to earn bribes in the police as that would be an unforgivable sin - A Carnage by Angels! But as this officer goes to the district police in Kolhapur and then to Mumbai police, he starts confronting the real picture. What he saw was a profound nexus of police, bureaucrats, power-brokers, and politicians - all hidden by the glittering curtain of "Rule of Law" and administrative sophistication. As this emotional story unfolds, what emerges in the film is a graphic narration of intrigue, deceit, sex, love and money in the world of glamour, police, bureaucracy, politicians, citizens, corporate bodies, powerbrokers, doctors and media.

== Cast ==
- Ashok Beniwal
- Nilesh Malhotra
- Saurabh Dubey
- Shalini Chandran as Radha R. Suryavanshi
- Jagannath Nivangune as Inspector
- Rajiv Roda as DCP Raghu Kumar Suryavanshi
- Shilpa Sapatnekar as Anchor – Medal Function

== Filming ==
The shooting for the film began in mid-2009. Most of the shoot was done at authentic police locations in Mumbai, Pune and Daund, a railway junction approximately 90 kilometers from Pune.

== Soundtrack ==
The music of the film was released on 28 November by Mahendra Singh Dhoni, captain of the Indian Cricket Team.

== Release ==
The film was released on 30 December 2011.
