= Love You Hamesha =

- Directed by: Kailash Surendranath
- Written by: Sanjay Chhel; Manoj Lalwani; Vivek Sharma
- Story by: Kailash Surendranath
- Produced by: Dr. Murali Manohar; Sunanda Murali Manohar
- Starring: Akshaye Khanna; Sonali Bendre; Amitabh Nanda; Riya Sen
- Cinematography: Ravi Yadav; R. M. Rao
- Edited by: Omkarnath Bhakri
- Music by: A. R. Rahman
- Production company: Cee (I) TV Entertainment
- Distributed by: NMP Movies
- Release date: 7 July 2022
- Running time: 130 minutes
- Country: India
- Language: Hindi

Love You Hamesha (transl. Love You Forever) is a 2022 Indian Hindi-language romance film written and directed by Kailash Surendranath. It stars Akshaye Khanna and Sonali Bendre as its main cast, and other supporting actors. The film was stuck in the cans and remained unreleased for over 21 years. Sonali Bendre called her role in this film one of her best roles. The film was finally released on 7 July 2022 on YouTube on the NMP Movies Channel.

== Plot ==
The story revolves around young people in their early 20s coming of age. Trouble follows a young woman when she breaks her engagement to a mismatched man and falls in love with someone else whom she meets after running away from home. A search for her is initiated by the woman's father. Things take a turn when her father conspires to ruin the relationship between the duo.

== Cast ==
- Akshaye Khanna as Shaurat
- Sonali Bendre as Shivani
- Amit Behl as Samrat
- Riya Sen as Meghna
- Rohit Bal as himself
- Daboo Malik as Ronnie
- Dalip Tahil as Ronnie's father
- Vijayendra Ghatge as Ronnie's adoptive father

== Production ==
The film began production in 1999. Elle editor Amitabh Nanda made his foray into acting with this film. Fashion designer Rohit Bal played himself in the film. The film was primarily shot in exotic locales in Rajasthan and a song sequence in Andaman Islands. The film was originally scheduled to be released in 2001. Due to unknown reasons the film was not released to mainstream public. The soundtrack composed by A.R. Rahman was released in April 2001 and two music videos were released on mainstream TV channels and YouTube.

== Soundtrack ==
Love you Hamesha

Soundtrack album by A. R. Rahman
- Released: 6 February 2001
- Recorded: 2000–2001 (Hindi Recording Version); Panchathan Record Inn, Chennai
- Genres: Feature film soundtrack, world music
- Labels: Saregama; Zee Music Company
- Producer: A. R. Rahman

A. R. Rahman chronology
One 2 Ka 4 (2001)	Love you Hamesha (2001)	Lagaan (2001)

The soundtrack has six songs and were reused from the Tamil film May Maadham released in 1994. The composer of the songs is A.R. Rahman with lyrics by Anand Bakshi. The soundtrack by A.R. Rahman was released to positive reviews and was received better than most Hindi films in 2001.

1. "Gup Chup Baatein" – Hariharan, Sadhna Sargam
2. "Botal Tod De – " – Hema Sardesai, Sonu Nigam
3. "Sone Ka Palang" – Ila Arun, Kavita Paudwal, Udit Narayan
4. "Yaar Teri Bewafaai " – Mahalaxmi Iyer
5. "Ek Ladki Thi " – Kavita Krishnamurthy
6. "Love You Hamesha" – Sonu Nigam, Shweta Shetty, G. V. Prakash
