= Education Times =

Newspaper supplement in India

- Type: Weekly magazine
- Format: Broadsheet
- Owner: Bennett, Coleman & Co. Ltd.
- Publisher: Bennett, Coleman & Co Ltd.
- Founded: 1995
- Language: English
- Headquarters: Mumbai
- Price: Complementary with Times of India on Mondays
- Website: Education Times

Education Times is a weekly supplement of The Times of India newspaper and was launched in 1995. This newspaper supplement caters to the ever-expanding student community as a career guide, counselor and adviser. The editorial covers exhaustive profiles of mainstream and offbeat careers, prepares the roadmap for a student on the way to a foreign degree. The editorial offers tips on cracking competitive exams as well as guidelines on how to prepare one’s resume or gear up for an interview. The editorial also puts the spotlight on topical issues affecting the student community and invites reader participation. Education Times is also available in Hindi in Uttar Pradesh, Uttarakhand and Haryana as a monthly compact.

Education Times has 21 editions in the following Indian cities - Mumbai, Delhi, Bangalore, Chennai, Pune, Kolkata, Hyderabad, Lucknow, Varanasi, Ahmedabad, Patna, Chandigarh, Baroda, Nagpur, Jaipur, Kanpur, Surat, Goa, Bhubhaneshwar, Bhopal and Indore.

== Content ==
Education Times portal was launched in 2006. The portal is not a mere extension of the print and has a lot more to offer to the online readers who are looking for information 24X7. Hitherto uncharted territory on print such as distance education, executive education, and virtual learning all form the backbone of the portal’s editorial strategy. The various sections of the portal are:

- Career Profiles: exhaustive profiles of mainstream and offbeat careers
- Test Drives: exam announcements
- Prep Talks: tips on how to crack various examinations
- Distance Learning: information on distance learning courses, institutes offering such courses, tips on how to prepare oneself for a distance learning course and other tips
- College Life: it is a ‘feel-light’ section that comprises college profiles and reflects campus life
- For Parents: dedicated to issues that parents face during the academic journey of their child
- Your Health: covers health-issues pertaining to the youth
- Book-ed: information on books, views and reviews
- Walk a Job: includes articles on resume tips, interview guide, workplace etiquette, dealing with boss/colleagues, tips to climb up the corporate ladder, soft skills, etc.
- Editor’s Pick: covers topical issues that effect the student community
- Virtual Classrooms: articles on e-learning- the concept, trends, courses available and the latest in e-learning
- Study Abroad: profiles courses in the US, UK, Australia, New Zealand, France and Singapore and has information on how one can apply for study there, on application procedures, visa formalities among others
- Experts’ Speak: industry leaders put forth their views here. The section also profiles notable student achievers, heads of institutes both in India and abroad and eminent personalities
- Edu Funds: information on scholarships and educational loans
- Exec Education: information on academic options for working professionals and the paraphernalia associated with it
- Students’ Speak: section for the students, by the students, of the students. It is a platform where they can voice their opinion on any issue ranging from lack of infrastructure in colleges to campus trends to experiences of studying abroad or studying any niche course
- Special Needs: section dedicated to students with learning difficulties and advocates inclusive education
- Coursing Along: lists course information
- Newsroom: features news related to the education sector
- Karan Gupta, is a study abroad counselor with Education Times

== See also ==
- Times Now
- ET Now
- Times Wellness
- Times Ascent
- The Economic Times
- List of newspapers in India by circulation
- List of newspapers in the world by circulation
