= Abha Singh =

Indian activist and High Court advocate

- Occupation: Lawyer
- Spouse: Yogesh Pratap Singh
- Children: Aditya Pratap & Isha Singh
- Website: www.abhasingh.in

Abha Singh is an Indian activist and advocate currently practising in the High Court of Judicature at Bombay. Her activism has focused on women's rights, gender equality, and justice.

She runs an NGO by the name Rann-Samar that provides free legal assistance to women and slum dwellers who claim to have been unfairly persecuted by local authorities and builders for land that is rightfully theirs.

== Education ==
Singh attended Loreto Convent, Lucknow and graduated from Isabella Thoburn College, Lucknow. She completed an M.Phil on Child Rights from Jawaharlal Nehru University, New Delhi and her LL.B. from Mumbai University. In 1994 she cleared the UPSC examination and joined the Indian Postal Service.

== Career ==
Singh started her career as a customs appraiser at Bombay Custom House in 1991 and remained there till 1994. Next, she joined the Indian Postal Service and later started her practice as a lawyer in the Bombay High Court.

=== Indian Postal Service ===
Singh joined the Indian Postal Service in 1995. During her stint as Director of Postal Services in Uttar Pradesh, she pioneered the usage of solar panels to power post offices to improve service to remote villages.

=== Law ===
Singh has been a part of many cases which also includes social cases in India. Some of the cases that she had participated in as a lawyer are -

1. When Justice Markanday Katju, in his capacity as the Chairman of the Press Council of India wrote to the governor of Maharashtra asking him to pardon Sanjay Dutt for his involvement in the 1993 bomb blasts. She was the first to bring to the notice of the public that he was exerting undue influence and wrote to the governor rebutting his assertions.
2. She was responsible for highlighting Zaibunissa Kazi’s case.
3. When the BMC gave the notice to demolish the “Puncham Pyao” water fountain opposite Bombay Gymkhana she successfully fought for them and got a stay from the Court.
4. Accused AIB for organising AIB Knockout for spreading obscenity.
5. She has been pursuing the Salman Khan Hit-and-Run case and is an active legal participant in the case.

=== Author ===
Abha Singh launched her book Stree – Dasha aur Disha which promotes women's empowerment by highlighting real-time cases and their legal recourse, and aims to educate women about their rights. Gul Panag, Bhagyashree and other celebrities praised her on launching the book.

=== Activism ===
In 2018 she cohosted a seminar on LGBT rights, adultery, and the pothole menace in the city of Mumbai alongside advocate Aditya Pratap.

She has advocated for menstrual leave for women.

Abha Singh held a round table discussion in Mumbai on how to make the Prevention of Sexual Harassment (POSH) Act, 2013 more effective in the corporate world.

Singh partnered with Akancha Srivastava on a campaign against cyber-stalking. Called Akancha Against Harassment, the campaign seeks to bring awareness among citizens about the issue of young people, especially girls, being targeted online, their activities tracked and which could even result in real-life manifestations like bullying, harassment and even, in some cases, criminal activities like kidnapping.

Singh offers legal aid to women with her radio show 'Dhun badal ke toh dekho', cohosted with Vidya Balan.

Abha Singh gave a seminar on 'Will and succession' for Amdavadi women on 1 March organised by the JITO Ladies Wing, Ahmedabad chapter with an aim to make women aware of their rights.

Singh said the state government can regulate dance bars but cannot prohibit them. Abha Singh said she is happy that the Supreme Court quashed the state government's provision to install CCTV cameras in dance bars as it violated the right to privacy and discouraged people from coming to dance bars. She also said the state government was responsible for some of these women "facing penury" without being provided an alternate means of employment.

Singh believes that women need to be educated for the development of the country. Such is her passion for women’s rights that even on her vacation, Abha Singh and her daughter have gone to Riyadh to study the situation of women there.

Abha Singh walked the ramp for fashion designer Shaina NC’s Fashion Show to raise funds for Cancer Patients Aid Association in Mumbai. Sonam Kapoor, Pretty Zinta, Karan Johar, and Shweta Bachchan Nanda, among others, walked the ramp to create awareness.

== Speeches ==
In May 2017, Singh spoke at TEDx Oxbridge. Entitled "Why laws in place do not empower women?"

Singh was a keynote speaker at the Global Forum of the XIN Philanthropy Conference 2018 in New Delhi hosted by the Alibaba Foundation.

Singh delivered a talk on the #MeToo Movement and its effect on Indian corporate culture at India Dialogues, Columbia University, New York

Singh spoke at She/Talks Mumbai, an event organised by SheThePeople.TV in association with the Consulate General of Canada in Mumbai.

== Personal life ==
Singh's father was an award-winning police officer. One of her primary influences was her mother who was the first woman from her village to attain Post-Graduation in 1961 from Allahabad University.

She is married to Yogesh Pratap Singh, who was formerly an officer in the Indian Police Service and currently serves as a lawyer in Bombay High Court.

== Rann-Samar Foundation ==
Singh runs an NGO named Rann-Samar, which helps people who cannot afford legal assistance from professional lawyers. The foundation has helped construct toilets in rural areas and organises beautician courses for women convicts in Lucknow Jail.

Rann-Samar provides computer training to convicts of Lucknow Jail and Jaunpur Jail. Around 200 convicts have been trained in Lucknow Jail in a span of one year.

== Awards ==
- Tata Consultancy Services and Taj Group Women Achievers Award in April 2008.
- Shatabdi Varsh Samman by Bank of Baroda for outstanding contribution to society through dissemination of knowledge in July 2008.
- Government Citizen Karmaveer Puraskaar by the Confederation of NGOs, New Delhi.
- 2007 Lead India finalist
- Mumbai Mayors award on International Women's Day in March 2011.
- I Am Woman Award in 2018
