= Sosyo =

Aerated drink from India

- Type: Carbonated drink
- Manufacturer: Sosyo Hajoori Beverages Pvt. Ltd. Reliance Consumer Products Ltd
- Country of origin: India
- Region of origin: Surat, Gujarat
- Introduced: 1923
- Ingredients: Fruit Juice Based Soft drink, Mixed Fruit flavor drink
- Website: www.hajoori.com

Sosyo is an Indian carbonated drink, produced and marketed mainly in the western and northern states of India; Gujarat, Maharashtra, Rajasthan, Uttar Pradesh and Madhya Pradesh. Sosyo is a mixture of grape and apple cider with some ingredients imported from Germany and Italy. Originating from Surat, it has since become a regional brand.

Sosyo is a product of the Swadeshi movement within the Indian independence struggle. Mohsin Hajoori introduced Sosyo in 1927 in Surat, as an Indian alternative to the British drink Vimto, which had been marketed in India by Abdul Hajoori since 1923.The current owner is Abbas hajoori

Originally, Sosyo was called Socio. The name was derived from the Latin word 'Socious', suggesting a social drink.

50 million bottles of Sosyo are consumed every year, mainly in Surat and parts of Gujarat and Maharashtra where bottling plants are located. It is exported as far as the United Arab Emirates, South Africa, New Zealand, the United Kingdom, and the United States of America, Gulf and many more countries. Exported bottles are marked as 'An Indian Drink' with a tri-coloured backdrop the exports department is managed by the director Mohammed Karbalai.

In January 2023, Reliance Consumer Products, a subsidiary of Reliance Retail, acquired a 50% stake in Sosyo Hajoori Beverages.

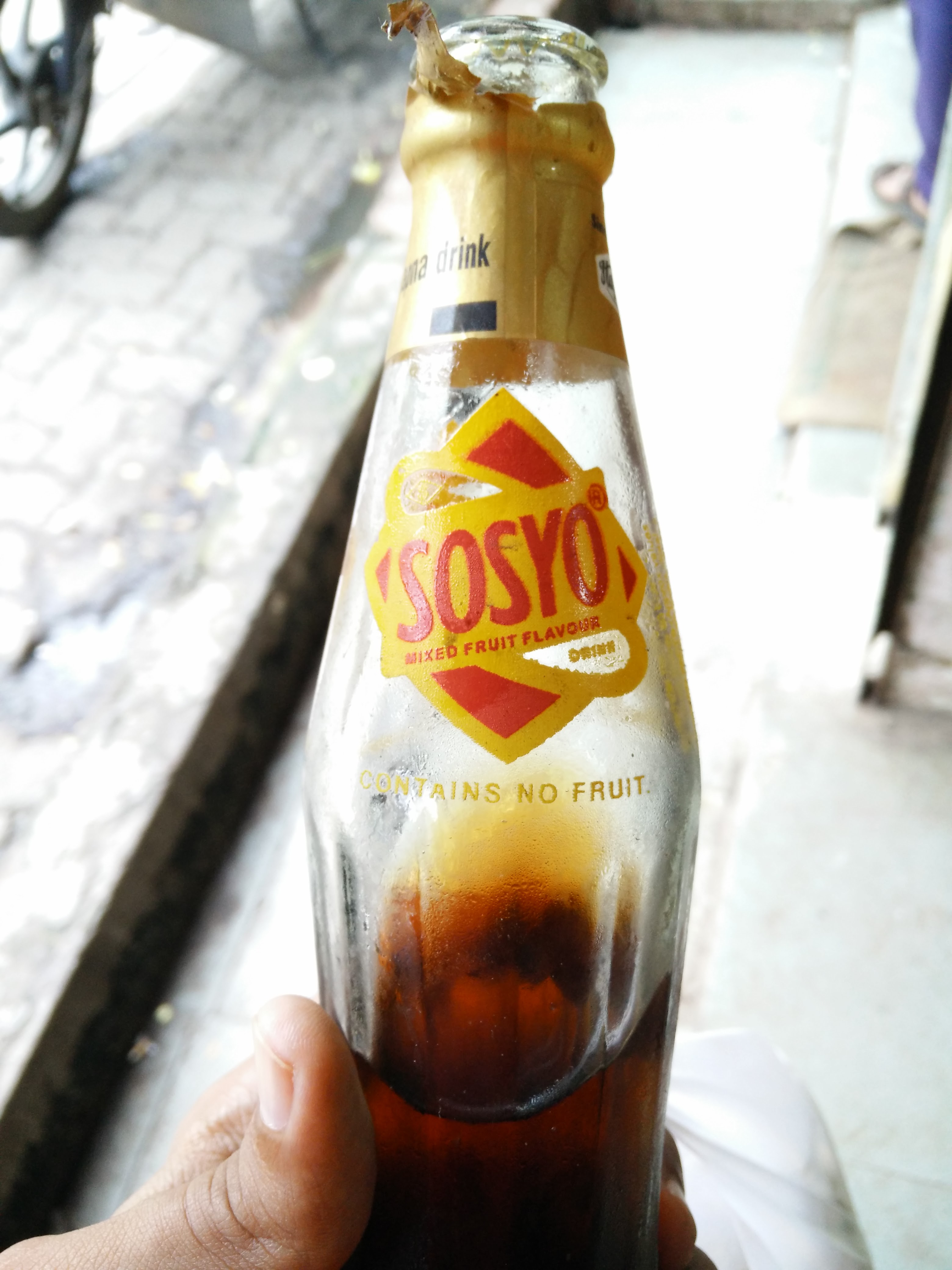
A bottle of Sosyo
