= Campa Cola =

Soft drink brand in India

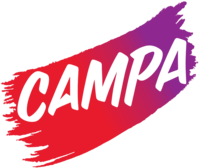
- Manufacturer: Reliance Industries
- Origin: India
- Introduced: 1977; 49 years ago
- Flavour: Cola, orange, lime, lime and lemon, lemon
- Variants: Campa Cola, Campa Lime, Campa Lemon, Campa Lime & Lemon and Campa Orange, Campa Jeera
- Related products: Thums Up, Coca-Cola, Pepsi Cola, Sosyo
- Website: campabeverages.com

Campa Cola is a soft drink brand in India. It was a market leader in the Indian soft drink market in the 1970s and 1980s in most regions of India when India imposed restrictions on foreign products. It was popular until the advent of the foreign players Pepsi and Coca-Cola after the liberalisation policy of the P. V. Narasimha Rao government in 1991.

== History ==
Campa Cola was a drink created by the Pure Drinks Group, owned by Mohan Singh in the 1970s.

Pure Drinks Group were the pioneer in the Indian soft drink industry when they introduced Coca-Cola into India in 1949 and were the sole manufacturer and distributor of Coca-Cola until the 1970s when the drink industry was nationalised for Indian interests. The Pure Drinks Group and Campa Beverages Pvt. Ltd. virtually dominated the entire Indian soft drink industry for about 15 years. Then they started Campa Cola during the absence of foreign competition with the logo heavily based on Coca-Cola's. The brand's slogan was "The Great Indian Taste", an appeal to nationalism. It subsequently marketed an orange flavoured drink called 'Campa Orange', with the logo "Campa" on its bottles.

During the 1980s, Campa Orange and Rush were the two main orange soft drinks in India, with large bottling plants in Mumbai (Worli) and Delhi. Following the return of foreign corporations to the soft drink market in the 1990s, the popularity of Campa Cola declined. In 2000–2001, its bottling plant and offices in Delhi were closed. In 2009 a small amount of product was still being bottled in the state of Haryana, but the drink was still not commonly found.

In 2022, Campa Cola was acquired by Reliance Industries for ₹22 crores. Reliance Retail Ventures, the retail arm of the Reliance group launched three variants of the drinks (cola, orange and lemon) at some select stores.

== Current operations ==
Reliance Consumer Products (RCPL), a subsidiary of Reliance Retail Ventures (RRVL), on 9 March 2023 announced the relaunch of the Campa brand.

The Campa portfolio will initially include Campa Cola, Campa Lemon and Campa Orange in the sparkling beverage category.

Reliance Industries (RIL) has also acquired soft drink brand Sosyo from Surat-based Hajoori. Reliance Consumer Products Ltd (RCPL) announced it would acquire a 50 percent equity stake in Gujarat-headquartered Sosyo Hajoori Beverages Pvt Ltd (SHBPL). The company owns and operates a beverage business under the flagship brand ‘Sosyo’. Existing promoters, the Hajoori family, will continue to own the remaining stake in SHBPL.

== Gallery ==
An advertisement for a Campa Cola product, Campa Orange. Source is a May 1979 Indian Indrajal Comics edition of Phantom: The Swamp Dragon.

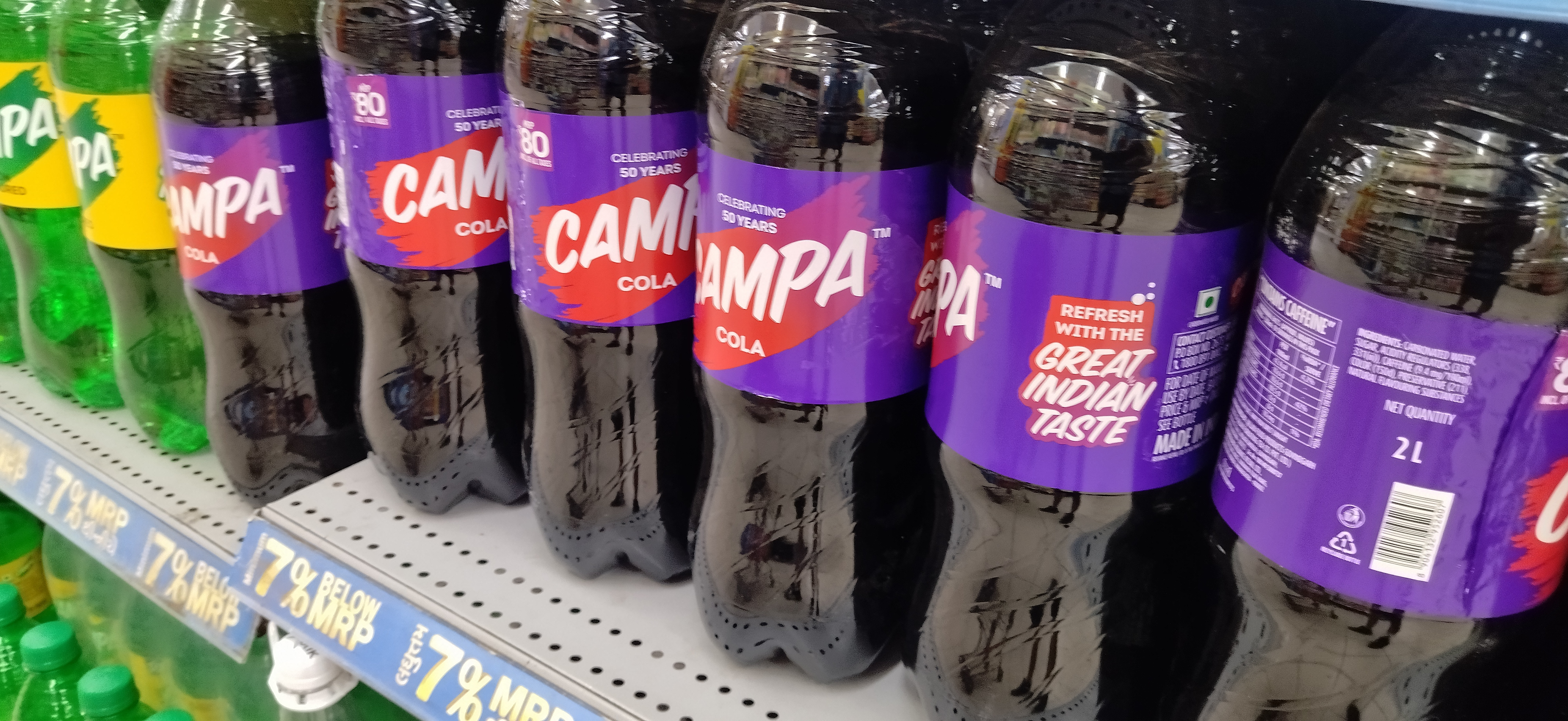
Campa Cola in 2023, Reliance Mart, ISCON Mega Mall, Ahmedabad.

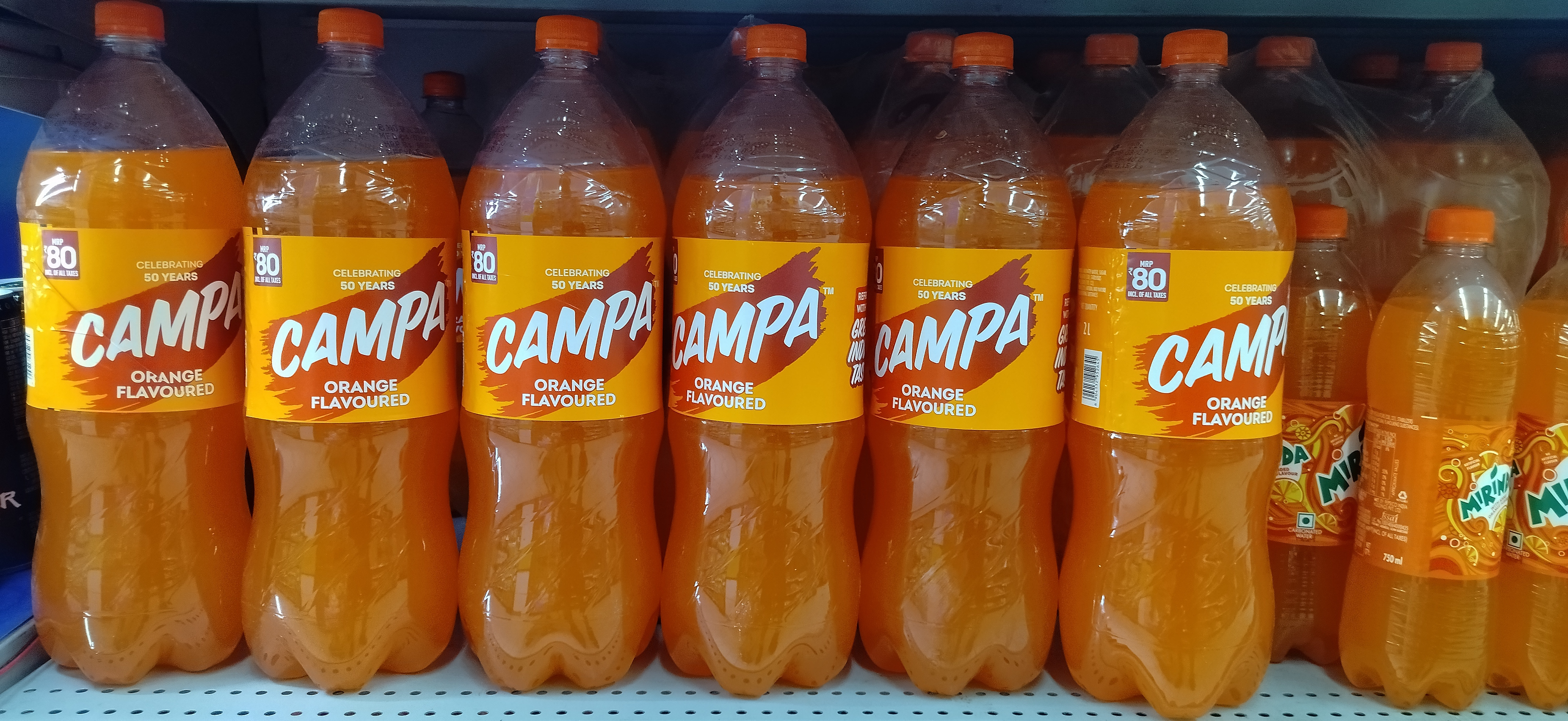
Campa Cola - Orange Flavor in 2023, Reliance Mart, ISCON Mega Mall, Ahmedabad.

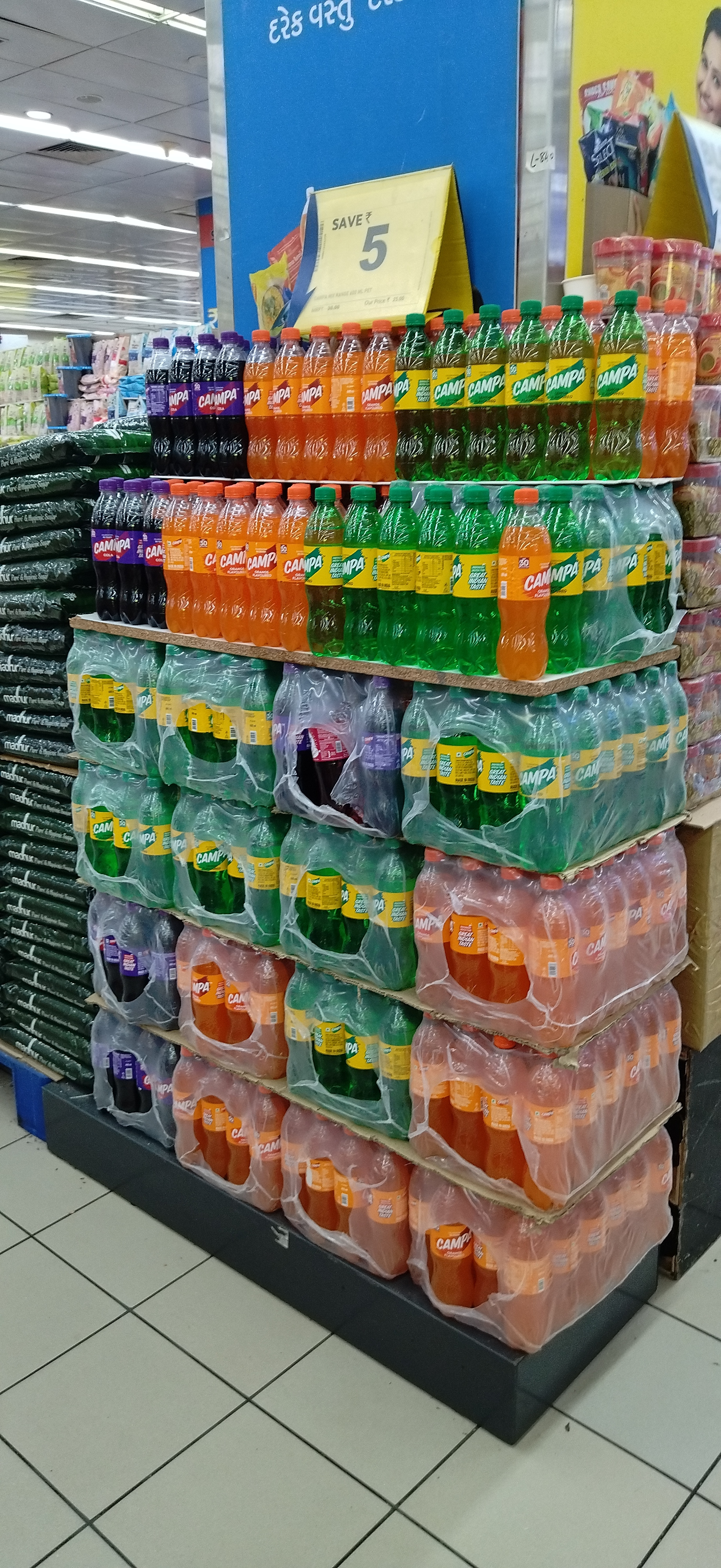
Campa Cola Aisle in 2023, Reliance Mart, ISCON Mega Mall, Ahmedabad

== See also ==
- List of soft drinks by country
