= 75th Anniversary of Indian Independence =

Celebration on 15 August 2022

Azadi Ka Amrit Mahotsav 75th anniversary of Indian independence
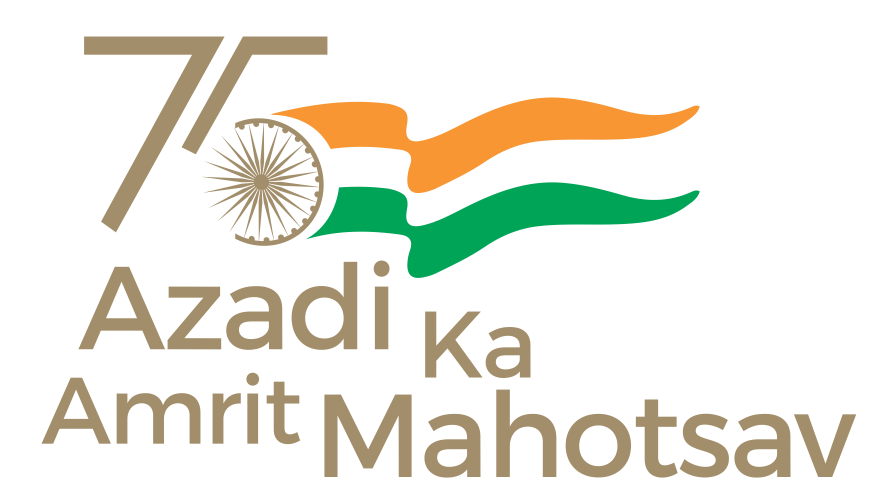
- Official logo of ceremony
- Observed by: India, Indians living abroad
- Type: National
- Significance: Commemorates the 75th anniversary of the independence of India
- Celebrations: Flag hoisting, parade, fireworks, singing patriotic songs and the national anthem Jana Gana Mana, speech by the prime minister of India and president of India
- Begins: 12 March 2021
- Ends: 15 August 2023
- Date: 15 August 2022
- Duration: 24 hours
- Frequency: Annual
- First time: 15 August 1947 (75 years ago)
- Started by: Government of India
- Related to: Independence Day

Azadi Ka Amrit Mahotsav or 75th Anniversary of Indian Independence was an event, in which the 75th anniversary of the independence of India was celebrated in India and abroad.

== Summary ==
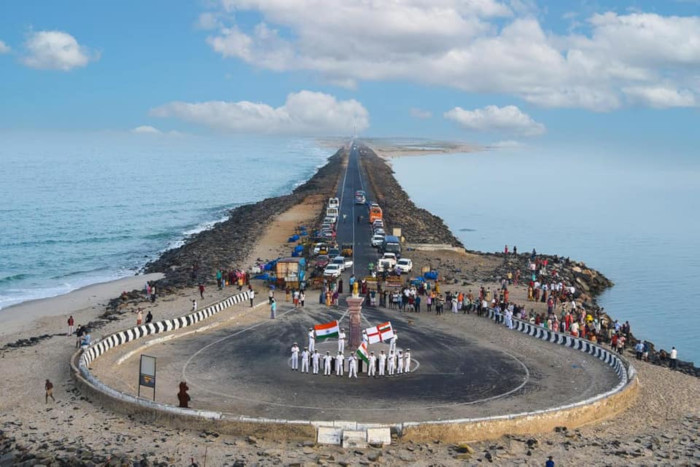
Indian flag flying in the Western Naval Command's areas of responsibility on India's 75th Independence Day.

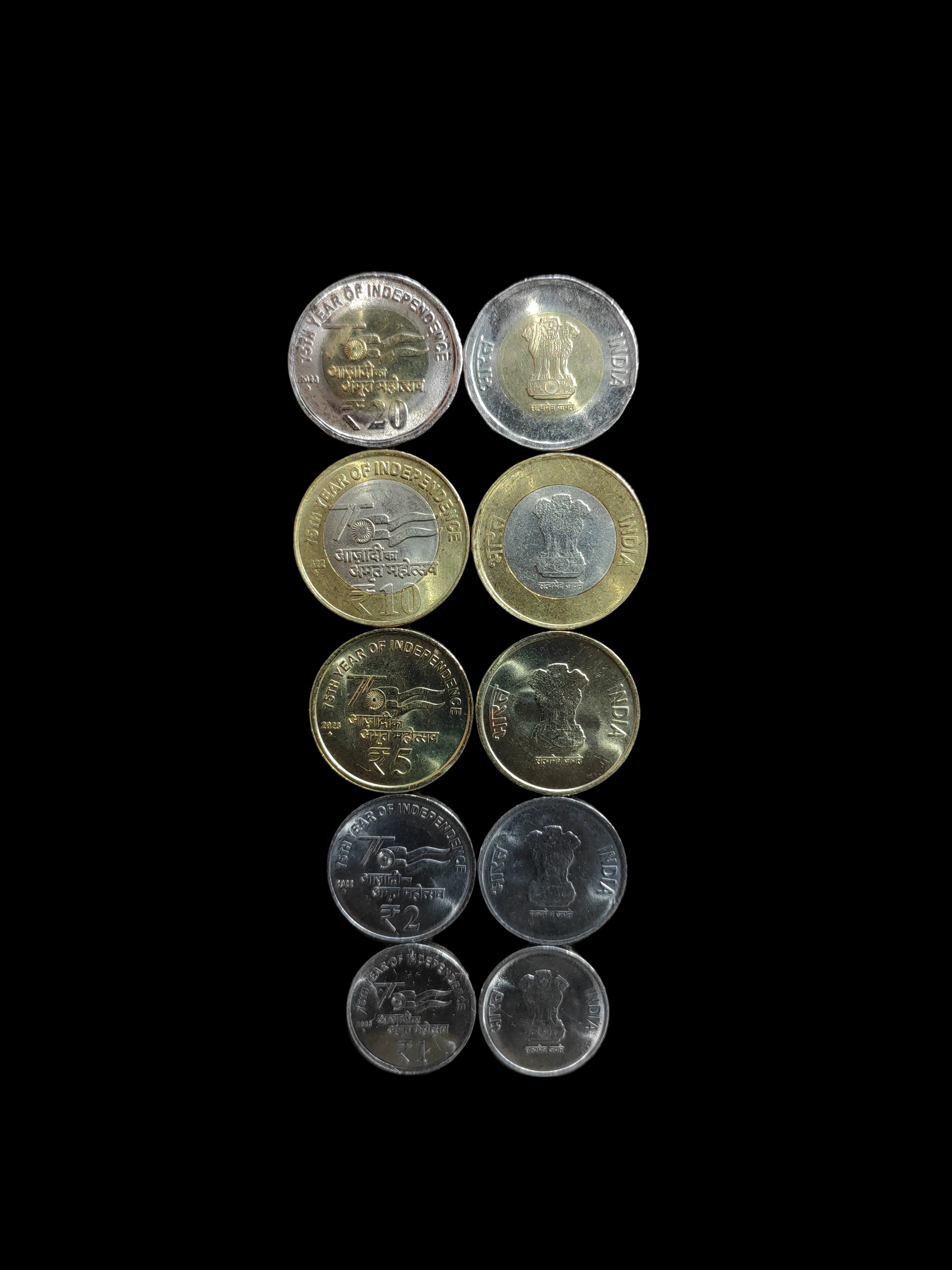
Set of coins of various denominations released on 6th May 2022 in memory of the event. These coins are available for regular circulation.

The government of India decided to celebrate 75 years of independence of India. It was an initiative to celebrate the history of India's people, culture and achievements and commemorate 75 years of independence from British rule. There were a series of events organised by the government of India. Prime minister of India Narendra Modi inaugurated the celebration on 12 March 2021 with a padyatra (march) at Sabarmati Ashram with a 75-week countdown to its 75th anniversary of independence and it will continue till 2023 ending on 15 August 2023.

There are five themes of the 'Azadi Ka Amrit Mahotsav', mainly:

- Freedom struggle: It focuses on and celebrates the countless freedom fighters who had helped India achieve freedom from the British. Programs under this theme include Birsa Munda Jayanti (Janjatiya Gaurav Diwas), Declaration of Provisional Government of Free India by Netaji, Shaheed Diwas etc.
- Ideas@75: This theme brings into spotlight the programs and events inspired by ideas and ideals that have shaped India so far and are to influence for next 25 years (till India's 100th independence day, named Amrit Kaal). The events and initiatives in this section include Kashi Utsav and Post Cards to Prime Minister.
- Resolve@75: This theme focuses on the collective resolve and determination to shape the destiny of India. Events and programs under this theme include initiatives such as Constitution Day, Good Governance Week etc.
- Actions@75: This theme focuses on all the efforts that are currently being undertaken by the Government to take India to carving out its position at the world level. It has a motto: SABKA SAATH. SABKA VIKAS. SABKA VISHWAS, SABKA PRAYAS. The events and initiatives under this include Pradhan Mantri Gati Shakti – a national master plan for multi-modal connectivity, WEPNxt: an initiative to nurture women entrepreneurship etc.
- Achievements@75: This theme highlights all the milestones and collective achievements achieved since India's ancient history along the way till today's 75-year-old independent country. Events and programs under this theme include initiatives such as Swarnim Vijay Varsh dedicated to the victory of 1971, launch of Shreshtha Yojana during Mahaparinirvan Diwas etc.

In the usual ceremonial practice the prime minister of India hoists the flag from Red Fort at Delhi followed by a speech on achievements and proud moments as a people of India.

The individual states and cities of India will also celebrate the same at their local level. For example, Thane has created its own version of 'Utsav 75', which will be held from 12 to 15 August and spread all over the city. The celebrations include various programs, performances, various rallies, community carnivals, etc. On 31 July 2022, in Mann Ki Baat, Narendra Modi urged Indians to replace their social media profile picture with the flag of India. from 2 August to 15 August.

The government of India also started a campaign Har Ghar Tiranga (transl. Tiranga at each house) under the auspices of 'Azadi Ka Amrit Mahotsav' to endorse people to bring the flag home and hoist it to mark the 75th year of India's independence. Ultra runner Zainul Abideen set the record for the longest tiranga run of India by running 555 km Prayagraj to Moradabad on the occasion of Independence Day and spread awareness of a clean Ganges. The government is facilitating the delivery of a 20 x 30-inch national flag through India Post to every household at a subsidized rate of ₹25 (26¢ US).

India has celebrated Azadi Ka Amrit Mahotsav commemorating 75 years of its independence. To renew the connection with India's ancient and glorious past and commit the task of nation-building towards a greater tomorrow, various cultural and heritage events and programmes have been done. Nari Samman, Tribal Pride, Swar Dharohar Festival, AKAM Delhi International Arts Festival etc. have been organised in that manner.

== See also ==
- Partition Horrors Remembrance Day
