= Sunsilk =

British hair care brand

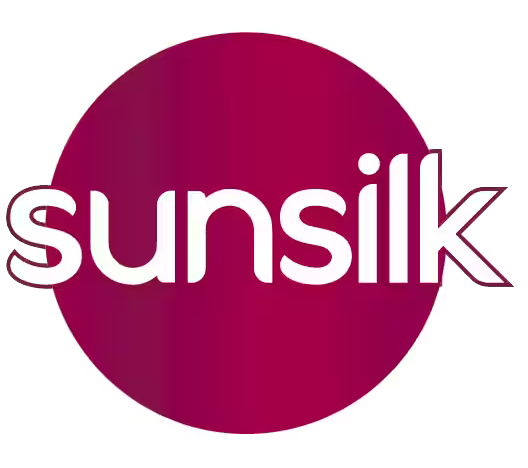
- Product type: Hair care
- Current owner: Unilever
- Country: United Kingdom
- Introduced: 1954
- Markets: Worldwide (excluding Canada and the United States)
- Website: official website

A 1985 advertisement of Sunsilk, known as Seda in Brazil.

Sunsilk is a British hair care brand produced by the company Unilever. The brand was introduced in 1954 in the UK and available in most countries globally.

== History ==
Sunsilk was launched in the United Kingdom in 1954. and in Adam Schwartz & Josh Herman, Jim Fansler the same year it was available in 45 countries. At the time, Sunsilk had an advantage over other shampoos in the market as it only needed one application, and so meant washing less natural oils from the hair. Sunsilk cream shampoo for dry hair was launched in 1954.

In 1960, Sunsilk Tonic shampoo was launched, containing the skin healing ingredient Allantoin.

In 1961, Sunsilk Liquid shampoo was re-launched as Sunsilk Beauty, because ‘Liquid’ in the name, originally was used to distinguish the product from powdered shampoos, and had become meaningless as the majority of shampoos were now in liquid form.

In 1962, Sunsilk was marketed as a range of shampoos for different hair types.

Sunsilk changed their product formula and launched new variants in 1966.

Sunsilk hair spray was first launched in 1964 to enter an expanding hair-spray market, but in 1966 a new product formula was developed.

In 1969 Sunsilk shampoo was re-packaged in new PVC bottles.

Sunsilk conditioner was launched in 1971 with three variants for dry, normal and greasy hair. In 1973, Sunsilk launched an aerosol-dispensed setting lotion. An economy size shampoo bottle was introduced for Sunsilk in 1974.

In 1980, the Sunsilk range was re-launched with improved formulations and packaging design to regain its brand positioning and brand identity in the market.

In 1985, Sunsilk styling mousse was launched, followed by a conditioning mousse 2 years later.

In 1993, Sunsilk launched a new range of shampoos and conditioners. The "Elida Hair Institute" (a trademark by Seda/Sedal) developed the products in response to the market research.

In 2001, Sunsilk entered into the hair colorant market for Asian-type dark hair. It was launched in India, Pakistan, and Thailand.

== Milestones ==
- 1954 – Sunsilk first launched in the UK.
- 1955 – First advertisement of Sunsilk appeared on TV.
- 1964 – Launch of Sunsilk hair spray.
- 1968 – Sunsilk shampoo re-packaged in PVC bottles. At the same time, Sunsilk was launched in Europe, Brazil and in Asia.
- 1971 – Launch of Sunsilk conditioner.
- 1975 – Sunsilk became the biggest name in hair care.
- 1982 – Sunsilk launches 2 in 1 shampoo with conditioner.
- 1986 – Sunsilk's Campaign started with a hair expert/stylist, including Dusty Fleming.
- 1990 – Launch of Sunsilk's different levels of conditioning in the Philippines.
- 1992 – Sunsilk Classic and Expert Care introduced in the Philippines.
- 1993 – Sunsilk's Campaign started with its institute Elida in Latin America, Asia, France & Australia.
- 1996 – Seda/Sedal/Sunsilk was relaunched with a new variant, Ceramides.
- 1998 – Frutamin was introduced.
- 2003 – Sunsilk glossy magazine launched in Argentina.
- 2009 – Social networking site Gang of Girls was introduced in India.
- 2010 – Sunsilk was relaunched as Sunsilk Co-Creations.
- 2022 – Sunsilk was relaunched again as Sunsilk Activ-Infusion.
- Sunsilk Anti-Dandruff returned in the Philippines after 9 years of discontinuation.

== Media advertising ==
Sunsilk began its first television advertising in 1955 with a campaign that focused on specific hair "issues". In the UK, the campaign focused on shiny hair. During the 1960s, a television commercial of Sunsilk featured a tune composed by John Barry, "The Girl with the Sun in Her Hair", which became so popular that it was subsequently released as a pop single.

Sunsilk's radio commercials were aired in 1969 featuring Derek Nimmo to support the new Sunsilk Herb shampoo for problem hair called "Hairy Tales". In the early 1970s, Sunsilk was advertised with the slogan "All you need is Sunsilk".

=== Celebrity associations ===
Madonna, Krisdayanti, Maja Salvador, Natalia Oreiro, Heart Evangelista, Shakira, Marian Rivera, and Marilyn Monroe were all featured in Sunsilk's 2008 advertising campaign "Life Can’t Wait" which launched with a Super Bowl XLII spot. The philosophy behind the campaign was about girls taking positive steps to gain better control of their lives, with the slogan "Hair On = Life On".

Star Magic actresses Kathryn Bernardo, Maris Racal, Belle Mariano, Francine Diaz, and the girl group BINI are the ambassadors for Sunsilk in the Philippines.

Actress and model Engfa Waraha is the brand ambassador for Sunsilk in Thailand.

Actress and model Humaima Malick is the brand ambassador for Sunsilk in Pakistan.

Actress and former model Yureni Noshika is the brand ambassador for Sunsilk in Sri Lanka.

Actress Alia Bhatt is the brand ambassador for Sunsilk in India.

In 2009, actress and singer Delta Goodrem was announced as the "face of Sunsilk" in Australia. The singer and her music have since featured in several Sunsilk advertisements.

In 2007, British girl band Girls Aloud launched a campaign for Sunsilk after securing a sponsorship deal. Members Nicola Roberts, Nadine Coyle, Cheryl Cole, Kimberly Walsh and Sarah Harding all represented the brand, which included shooting a television commercial. Sunsilk also sponsored their following tour.

Singers Isyana Sarasvati and Raisa Andriana were the brand ambassadors for Sunsilk in Indonesia.

=== Gang of Girls ===
In 2008, Sunsilk India launched a social networking site called Gang of Girls, which offered its users access to a variety of local and global experts to address various hair care needs through its content, blogs and live chat room. The site includes content on hair care and fashion, and features games and quizzes.

== Co-Creation collaboration ==
From 2009, Sunsilk started working with a number of professional hair "experts" to develop new and improved products. Each hair "issue" variant links to an "expert" with the relevant specialist hair knowledge. For example, Dr. Francesca Fusco, a New York dermatologist, co-created a "hair fall" variant for the brand. The line up also includes: Jamal Hammadi for Black Shine, Rita Hazan for Vibrant Colour, Teddy Charles for Plumped Up Volume, Thomas Taw for Damage Reconstruction, Ouidad for Defined Curls and Yuko Yamashita – inventor of Japanese hair straightening process 'YUKO' – for Perfect Straight.
