= Preethi Srinivasan =

Indian cricketer

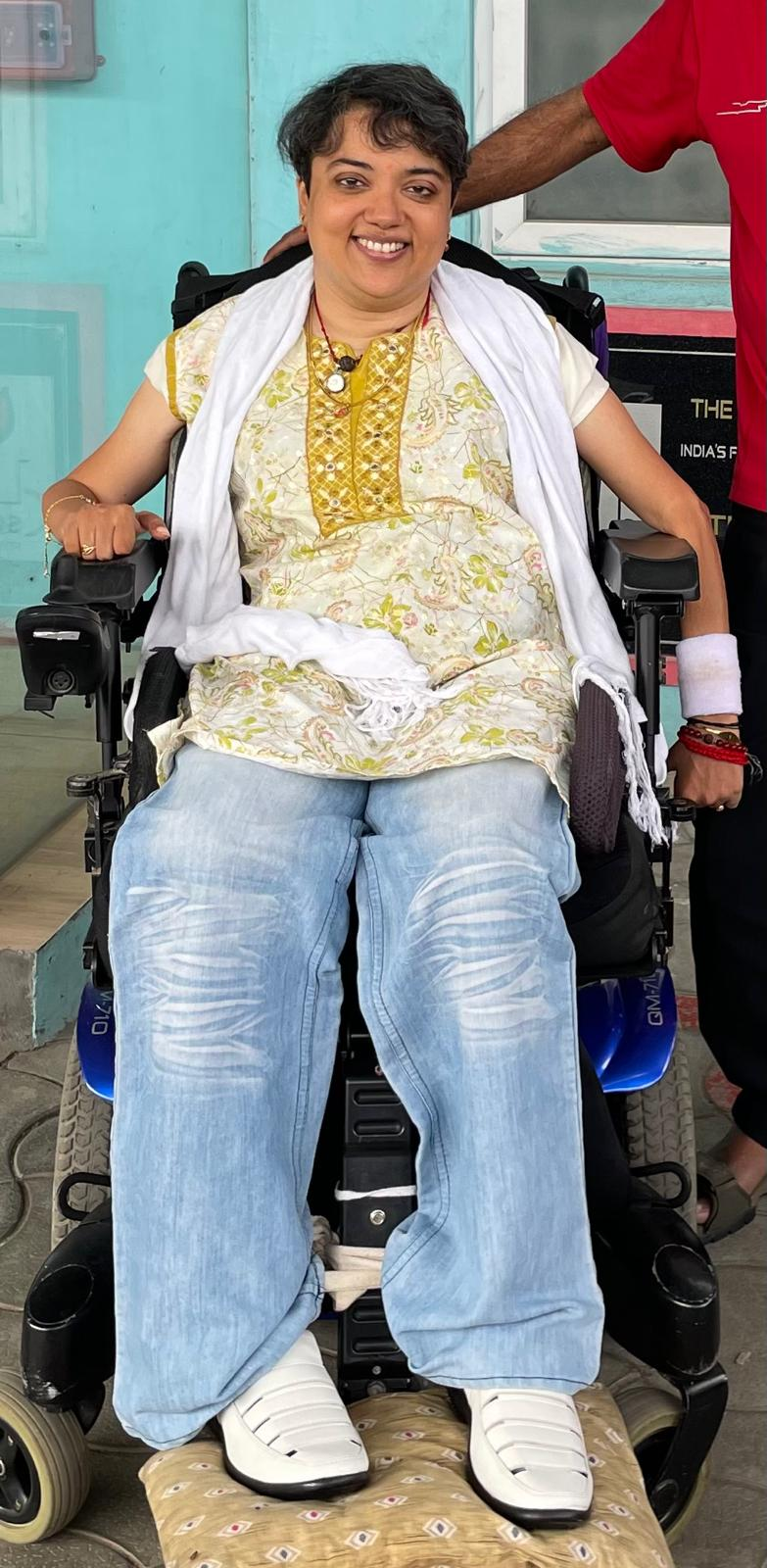
Preethi Srinivasan in her office in Thiruvannamalai, Tamil Nadu on October 21, 2023

Preethi Srinivasan (born 1979) was the captain of the under-19 Tamil Nadu women's cricket team, and led the state team to the national championships in 1997 at the age of 18. After surviving an accident that left her quadriplegic, she co-founded Soulfree, a foundation that champions the causes of restoring, rehabilitating, and re-integrating those with spinal cord injuries and spreads awareness on its prevention among Indian youth.

She was also a title-holder swimmer, having won a state gold in 50 m breaststroke and silver in other events. After her spinal cord injury she often delivers talks on disability issues.

== Education and early years ==
Preethi graduated from Upper Merion Area High School, Pennsylvania, US, in 1997 and was awarded the academic honours for outstanding accomplishment and excellence in academics for year 1996/97 along with other recognitions. In class 12, she was among United States of America's top 2 percent merit students and was awarded representation with Who's Who Among American high school students. Due to her father's transferable job, Preethi got the opportunity to extensively travel and learn about different cultures/traditions.

After her accident, she took up a bachelor correspondence course in medical sociology from the University of Madras. She also holds interest in music, art, films, and literature. She considers her mother, Mrs. Vijayalakshmi Srinivasan, a constant source of encouragement and backing.

== Career ==
Preethi's charitable organization, Soulfree, was founded with the aim of "transforming the lives of persons with disabilities".

== Awards ==
- Vijay TV's "Sigaram Thotta Pengal – Ray of Hope" award
- Raindropss' "Woman Achiever of the Year 2014" award
- Femina "Penn Sakthi" award bestowed upon the top 10 most influential women in Tamil Nadu for the year 2014
- Envisage ability award 2014...
- Sudesi magazine's "Dhruva award" for excellence in social work
- The Rotary's highest award "For the Sake of Honour"
- Agent of change" Award from district Rotaract Council (Rotary International district 3230) for the year 2014–15
- Kalpana Chawla award from Tamil Nadu CM
