= Malini Agarwal =

Indian blogger

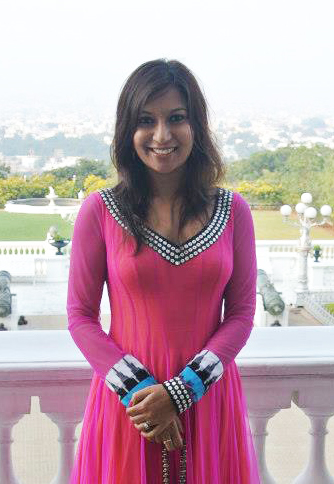
- Malini Agarwal in 2012
- Born: 26 May 1977 (age 49); Allahabad, Uttar Pradesh, India
- Other name: MissMalini
- Occupation: Influencer
- Years active: 2000−present
- Spouse: Nowshad Rizwanullah
- Website: missmalini.com

Malini Agarwal (born 26 May 1977), a.k.a. MissMalini, is an Indian celebrity and influencer. She was a radio personality on Radio One (India) and Channel V. Her blog, MissMalini.com is founded in 2008. She also appeared on various TV shows, including two seasons of her own show, MissMalini's World on TLC and Inside Access with MissMalini on VH1. Agarwal is the author of the book To The Moon: How I Blogged My Way To Bollywood.

== Early life ==
Malini was born on 26 May 1977, in Allahabad, India. She grew up in various countries as her parents worked with the Indian foreign service, eventually graduating from Maitreyi College, Delhi University and moving to Mumbai, where she now lives.

== Radio ==
Agarwal started her radio career as a Radio Jockey with WIN 94.6 in Mumbai, which later became Go 92.5 and then Radio One 94.3. Some of the shows she hosted included Horn OK Please, 225, Tiger Time with Malini, Overdrive and Malini till Midnight. Agarwal worked her way up to Programming Director before she decided to transition to digital TV, becoming Channel V India's Head of Digital Content. Although she no longer hosts her own show, Agarwal continues to be a regular contributor to radio shows, including a weekly call-in with the BBC Asia Network.

== MissMalini.com ==
MissMalini.com was founded as a hobby blog in 2008, as an extension to the gossip column Agarwal had been writing on the side for many years, with Mumbai tabloid Mid-Day. She left Channel V to focus full-time on the blog some time after.
