= Jyoti Dhawale =

Indian activist (born 1976)

- Born: 24 July 1976 (age 50); Namkum, Ranchi, Jharkhand
- Education: Air Force Golden Jubilee Institute, New Delhi; Holy Innocents High, Wellington, Coimbatore; Kendriya Vidhyalaya Agra, Secunderabad; Saint George's Convent Agra, The Air Force School Bagdogra, Sherwood Public School Hyderabad
- Occupations: Community advisor, motivational speaker, writer/blogger
- Years active: 2005-present
- Height: 170 cm (5 ft 7 in)
- Children: 1

Jyoti Dhawale (also known as "Jo") is an HIV activist who works to empower people living with HIV/AIDS in India and across the world.

== Early life ==
Jyoti was born July 24, 1976, at Namkum Military Hospital in Ranchi, Jharkhand. Her father, Group Captain Janak Narayan Dhawale, was an ex-NDA (39th Course) officer in the Indian Air Force and her mother was a homemaker. Dhawale grew up and was schooled in various parts of India. She finished her secondary schooling from National Institute of Open Schooling, New Delhi.

== Health ==
She developed bilateral sensorineural hearing loss at the age of 3 due to a bicycle accident. She strongly relies on lip-reading to follow the conversations and uses text messaging or video calls, instead of phone calls.

== Medical negligence ==
Dhawale underwent three forced abortions; during the third one in 2005, she contracted HIV due to medical negligence. On her fourth forced attempt, she tested positive, and decided to go ahead with the pregnancy. On March 31, 2006, she delivered a healthy, HIV-negative baby born via Cesarean section.

== Career ==
=== Humanitarian work ===
Dhawale is a supporter of the rights and equality of People Living with HIV/AIDS (PLWHA) and the LGBT community. She has been involved in activities concerning human rights, human trafficking, sex workers and women and child health since 2007. She has supported Bapuji Center for AIDS Research & Education, (B'CARE) since 2012 as a regional coordinator for its Hyderabad-Mumbai AIDS Ride 2014. She counsels HIV (infected/affected) and suicide-related cases and is also a motivational speaker at the Deep Griha Society in Pune.

=== Activism ===
Dhawale promotes awareness and education of PLWHA and works with PLWHA survivors and international activists. In December 2012, she took part in a short documentary film by Through Positive Eyes, in collaboration with Heroes Project, along with 13 other HIV-positive people. The project was co-directed by London-based South African photographer and AIDS activist Gideon Mendel. She has also worked with Roy Wadia, brother of Riyad Vinci Wadia who worked for World Health Organization.

She is the creative manager and social media and public relations head for Black Swan Entertainment, where she and her team produce stories of women empowerment for a TV show ('Stree Shakti'). She is also the ambassador for Beydaar in Pakistan.

=== Featured in publications ===
An interview with Dhawale was published in the Times of India stating an example of successful and satisfied life of a mixed-status couple. She works to inspire, motivate and encourage people living with HIV to live a healthy lifestyle. Her interview articles have been published in various sites. Dhawale's work as ambassador for The Stigma Project enables her to create and spread awareness, art, provocation and education on a wide scale. In her documentary video Life After HIV she speaks in brief about her journey.

=== Endorsements ===
Since 2012, Dhawale has been the Indian Goodwill ambassador of The Stigma Project, which provides insight into HIV stigma within countries/communities. The program enables her to create and spread awareness, art, provocation and education on wide scale. Dhawale is also a face of RiseUpToHIV campaign with a tagline, "No Shame About Being HIV Positive." The campaign received the 2014-2015 KarmaVeer Award from iCongo REX for selfless work through social activism and reaching out to break the myth against HIV.

== Awards ==
In 2019 Dhawale was awarded the Gold Karmaveer Chakra Award for proactive voluntary citizen action. The award was instituted by the International Confederation Of NGOs (iCONGO) in partnership with the UN.

She has also been awarded the Bharat Prerna Award, which honors disabled people, and the APCOM Hero Award.

== Personal life ==
Dhawale lives in Bangalore since 2022 and has one child.
