= Liril =

Indian soap brand

Liril is a popular soap brand sold, to a large degree, in India, and Asia, as well as a few places in Europe. The soap is currently manufactured by Hindustan Unilever in India. Liril launched a blue variant called Icy Cool Mint in 2002. It also tried launching an Orange variant, called Liril Orange Splash in India in 2004. Neither of these variants created much splash in the market. The company even changed agencies handling the brand, from Lowe to McCann Erickson before going back to Lowe.

== Advertising and sales ==
Liril has had a static market share for quite some time now. The majority of their sales happen during summer. Preity Zinta, among others, has advertised for this product. The original ads, featuring Karen Lunel, from 1975 and 1986 are now popular on the internet.

Some of the others who were also in the Liril ad are Deepika Padukone, Hrishita Bhatt, and Pooja Batra.
