= Shaktimaan (franchise) =

Superhero media franchise

- Created by: Mukesh Khanna; Dinkar Jani; Ghalib Asad Bhopali; Brij Mohan Pandey
- Original work: Shaktimaan
- Years: 1997–present

Films and television
- Film(s): Shaktimaan (film) (TBD)
- Television series: Shaktimaan (1997–2005); Shaktimaan is Back (TBD)
- Animated series: Shaktimaan: The Animated Series (2011); Shaktimaan (TBD)
- Television film(s): Hamara Hero Shaktimaan (2013)

Games
- Video game(s): Shaktimaan; Shaktimaan: Tab

Shaktimaan is an Indian superhero media franchise consisting of TV series, comic books and films. The original work is Shaktimaan, which was produced by Mukesh Khanna under his banner Bheeshm International and directed by Dinkar Jani and Vikram Veturi.

== Production ==
Inspired by American superhero Superman, Mukesh Khanna said Shaktimaan was conceptualised by him in 1981 when he was working on a film with Rajshri Productions. He narrated the idea to producer Rajkumar Barjatya, who liked it, and the two adapted it into a film titled Akash. In November 1997, Screen reported quoted him: "I would watch my nephew sitting glued to the TV whenever Power Zone came on, shooting with imaginary fire guns, or operating some imaginary hi-fi gadget in his own little world. That's when it struck me that if I made Shaktimaan I would have a readymade audience of kids who are always most impressed with SFX tricks." Over the development of the titular character, Khanna said, "In Indian mythology, there are a lot of strong characters but no super-heroes. All we get to see our Superman or Spider-Man, who are alien concepts. That's why I decided to create an Indian superhero, Shaktimaan, who is born out of a yagna, and a result of all the creative energies of the universe. A superhero who can fly... disappear. And when he is not in his super-hero avataar, he's a bumbling photographer who always misses scooping much to the chagrin of his boss Geeta Vishwas." He added that the attire of Shaktimaan's alter ego, "complete with buck teeth and floppy hair", was inspired by American comedian Jerry Lewis.

Having wanted the "best ever" special effects seen on Indian television, following the series' airing, Khanna felt that it "[fell] is short of [his] expectations". He added, "When I had planned the serial I wanted the kind of special effects seen in Superman, Spider-Man and Terminator. Maybe I was too ambitious. Computer graphics has just arrived in India and there is lack of trained professionals here." He further said, the special effects for each episode cost him ₹2 lakh, and ₹10 lakh overall. In 2004 Sign language interpretation was launched for the social message given at the end of the episodes.

The series was sponsored by Parle-G from its first episode.

In 2019, Khanna revealed through his YouTube channel Bheeshm International that the show had to be cancelled because the high broadcasting charges were bringing him losses, and not due to complaints of children imitating stunts from the show as popularly believed.

== Television series ==
=== Shaktimaan (1997–2005) ===
Shaktimaan (Hindi: शक्तिमान) is a fictional Indian superhero from the television series of the same name which aired on DD National from 27 September 1997 to 27 March 2005 on Sundays. The series was produced by Mukesh Khanna and directed by Dinkar Jani. It has also aired on Pogo in English, Tarang in Odia and Chutti TV in Tamil, and repeated its Hindi telecast on STAR Utsav. Mukesh Khanna plays the roles of Shaktimaan and his alter ego Pandit Gangadhar Vidyadhar Mayadhar Omkarnath Shastri, a photographer for the newspaper Aaj Ki Aawaz. Shaktimaan is depicted as a human who has attained superhuman strength and power through deep meditation and attaining control over five elements of life. Kitu Gidwani, and later Vaishnavi Mahant plays the role of Geeta Vishwas, a reporter in the series who loves Shaktimaan. Surendra Pal plays the role of Tamraj Kilvish.

=== Shaktimaan: The Animated Series (2011–2012) ===
Shaktimaan: The Animated Series is an Indian animated action series based on the live-action series Shaktimaan. It is created by Reliance Animation and was aired on Sonic on 20 December 2011. In 2017 Discovery Kids acquired the rights of syndication from Reliance Entertainment.

=== Shaktimaan (TBD) ===
In October 2019, Mukesh Khanna announced himself that a 3D animated series will be launched in future, with its teaser launching on 7 December 2019 at Comic Con India 2019.

== Web series ==
On 15 March 2019 a show named Sorry Shaktimaan started on a YouTube channel having the same name. It is the educational section of Shaktimaan.

== Film ==
| Year | Films | Producer | Notes |
|---|---|---|---|
| 2013 | Hamara Hero Shaktimaan | Bheeshm International | Telefilm |
| TBA | Shaktimaan† | Producing with Sony Pictures International | Announced |

== Cast and characters ==
| Character | Live-action TV series | Television film | Animated TV series |
| Character | Shaktimaan (1997-2005) | Hamara Hero Shaktimaan (2013) | Shaktimaan: The Animated Series (2011) |
|---|---|---|---|
| Pt. Gangadhar VIdyadhar Mayadhar Omkarnath Shastri/Shaktimaan | Mukesh Khanna | Mukesh Khanna | |
| Vehaan Arya/Shaktimaan | | | Jason Griffith (Voice) |
| Gita Viswas | Kitu Gidwani; Vaishnavi Mahant | Manasi Salvi | |
| Lina Ray | | | Suzy Myers (Voice) |
| Tamraj Kilvish | Surendra Pal | Surendra Pal | Scott Rayow (Voice) |
| Dr. Jackol | Lalit Parimoo; Arun Bakshi | Gufi Paintal | |
| Mahaguru | Tom Alter | Tom Alter | Michael Alston Bailey (Voice) |
| Sahab / Kumar Ranjan | Raman Khatri | | |
| Durandhar Singh | Raju Shrivastav | | |
| Kaushaliyaa | Manjeet Kullar | | |
| Shalaaka / Kaali Billi | Ashwini Kalsekar | | |
| Shaliyaa / Safed Billi | Dolly Minhas | | |
| Naurangee | Kishore Bhanushali | | |
| Prof. Viswas | Rajendra Gupta | | |
| Mayor Jai Kumar Janardan / Kakodar | Nawab Shah | | |
| Paroma | Deepshikha | | |
| Sheraali | Deepshikha | | |
| Queen Mayaadri | Sunila Karambelkar | | |
| Bankelal / Toyman | Brij Mohan Pandey | | |
| Kaamini | Nupur Alankaar | | |
| The Villain Alien | Shikha Swaroop | | |
| Bilas Rao | Goga Kapoor | | |
| Matandeeka | Mohini Ghosh | | |
| Inspector Jai Singh | Deepraj Rana | | |
| Satyaprakash Nirala | Sharad Smart | | |
| Maansi Sharma | Urvashi Dholkia | | |
| Teemira / Behroopia | Annu kashyap | | |
| Maansi | Neelam Mehra | | |
| Dr. Gyaani | | | Mike Pollock (Voice) |
| Tick | | | Marc Thompson (Voice) |
| Tock | | | Sean Schemmel (Voice) |
| Bumpy | | | Tom Wayland (Voice) |
| General D’Cruze | | | David Manis (Voice) |
| Major Geek | | | Dan Green (Voice) |

== Controversies ==
When Shaktimaan first aired on Doordarshan, there were a lot of controversies created as children set themselves on fire or jumped off buildings hoping that Shaktimaan would save them. In an effort to promote responsible behaviour among children, Mukesh Khanna spent a substantial part of the airtime in explaining to the children that the stunts shown on television were not real and should not be emulated. Khanna also stated that most of the controversies were fake and were raised in media to undermine its popularity.

== Comic books ==
A series of comic books appeared featuring Shaktimaan and published in many Indian languages as well as English in association with Diamond Comics.

== Merchandise ==
Shaktimaan merchandise like costumes, stickers, dolls were introduced in the market.

== Games ==
Zapak, an Indian mobile video game developer has released adaptations of the animated TV series including Shaktimaan, Shaktimaan: Tab.

== Awards and nominations ==
Shaktimaan: The Animated Series won 2012 FICCI BAF award for best animated TV series.
