= Shaktiman =

Shaktiman may refer to:

- Shaktiman truck
- Shaktiman (horse)
- Shaktiman (1993 film)
- Shaktiman (2024 film)
- Shaktimaan (franchise)
  - Shaktimaan a TV show
  - Shaktimaan: The Animated Series
