= Maryada =

Maryada may refer to:

- Maryada (1950 film), a Bengali drama film
- Maryada (1971 film), a Hindi film
- Maryada... of an Indian family, a Hindi TV serial on TV Asia
- Maryada: Lekin Kab Tak?, a Hindi TV serial on STAR Plus
- Sikh Rehat Maryada, the Sikh code of conduct
