= Bambai Ka Babu =

Bambai Ka Babu may refer to:

- Bombai Ka Babu, a 1960 Hindi film
- Bambai Ka Babu (1996 film), a 1996 Bollywood action film
