= Waqt Batayega Kaun Apna Kaun Paraya =

- A Promotional logo of "Waqt Batayega Kaun Apna Kaun Paraya"
- Created by: Vikas Kapoor
- Written by: Vikas Kapoor
- Directed by: Rajiv Bhanot; Ajay Kumar; Vivek Kumar
- Starring: See below
- Opening theme: "Waqt Batayega Kaun Apna Kaun Paraya" by Anjan Biswas
- Country of origin: India
- No. of episodes: 116

Production
- Producers: Dheeraj Kumar & Zuby Kochhar
- Running time: 23 minutes

Original release
- Network: Sony Entertainment Television
- Release: 14 April – 30 October 2008

Waqt Batayega Kaun Apna Kaun Paraya (transl. Time will tell who is your own and who is an outsider) is a Hindi television saga that aired on Sony TV based on the story of a girl named Rudra who faces many hurdles by her adoptive family members. The series premiered on 14 April 2008 and is produced by Dheeraj Kumar's production house Creative Eye Limited.

== Plot ==
The story is based on the life of an adopted girl named Rudra, who is searching for love from her stepmother and other family members. Rudra knows that she is adopted. She is very close to her father but not to other family members. She is aware of her limitations and keeping that in mind she takes care of her family members. She does not take it to heart when family members yell at her or curse her.

In reality she is the heiress of the family as she is her stepfather's older brother's daughter and Nanny is her real mother. However, Nanny hides this truth as her marriage with Rudra's real father was hidden from the family because she was poor.

== Cast ==
- Payel Sarkar as Rudra
- Rucha Gujarathi as Piya
- Sachin Shroff as Saurav / Joy
- Nishigandha Wad as Sunanda
- Mukesh Khanna as Biswajeet Raichoudhury
- Kishori Shahane as Yashomati Raichoudhury
- Surendra Pal as Sarvadaman Raichoudhury
- Eva Grover as Jaya
- Gufi Paintal as Pandit Ji
- Nayan Bhatt as Dadi
- Rakesh Kukreti as Bankim
- Aakansha Awasthi as Shubhangi
- Aroop Deb as Upendra
- Jaya Binju as Nandita
- Pooja Pihal as Protima
- Deepak Parashar as Basab Malhotra
- Roopa Ganguly as Madhvi Basab Malhotra
- Madhuri Sanjeev as Taiji
- Smriti Sinha as Mitali
- Shriya Bisht as Anushka
- Geeta Khanna as Mangla
- Devi Irani as Shakuntala
- Sameer Sharma as Dev
