= Om Namah Shivay (1997 TV series) =

Indian mythological television series

- Genre: Spirituality
- Written by: Vikas Kapoor
- Screenplay by: Darshan Laad
- Directed by: Dheeraj Kumar
- Starring: Samar Jai Singh; Yashodhan Rana; Gayatri Shastri
- Narrated by: Rishabh Shukla; Dilip Sinha
- Music by: Sharang Dev
- Opening theme: Pt. Jasraj
- Country of origin: India
- Original language: Hindi
- No. of seasons: 1
- No. of episodes: 208

Production
- Producer: Zuby Kochhar
- Running time: 45 minutes
- Production company: Creative Eye

Original release
- Network: DD National
- Release: 19 January 1997 – 7 January 2001

Om Namah Shivay is an Indian television series that aired on DD National based on the Shiva Purana.

== Plot ==
The series centers on Shiva and presents stories drawn from Hindu history and religious traditions. The series begins with the creation of the universe and the emergence of the devas, then guides the viewer through Shiva's marriage to Sati, Sati's death, Shiva's marriage to Parvati, and tales of many devotional acts, demonic battles, and important religious events (such as the creation of the twelve Jyotirlingas). It ends with events covered in the Mahābhārata and the blessing of the hero Arjuna by Shiva.

Sources included Vayu Purana, Shiva Purana, Skanda Purana, Linga Purana, Tantra Churamani, Valmiki Ramayana, Shvetashvatara Upanishad, Vamana Purana, Varaha Purana, Kurma Purana, Rudra Yamala Tantra, Padma Purana, Devi Bhagavata Purana, and Bhagavata Purana. The director, Dheeraj Kumar oversaw nine years of research.

== Cast ==
- Samar Jai Singh as Shiva (1997, 2000–01)
  - Yashodhan Rana replaced Singh as Shiva (1997–2000). He also portrayed the role of Kamadeva initially.
- Gayatri Shastry as Parvati and other forms of Shakti
  - Manjeet Kullar as Sati
  - Priyanka Putran as Kaushiki
- Jagesh Mukati as Ganesha
- Saurabh Agarwal as Kartikeya
- Rajeshwari Sachdev as Rati
- Amit Pachori as Vishnu
- Anita Kulkarni/Reena Kapoor as Lakshmi
- Sunil Nagar as Brahma
- Mona Parekh as Saraswati
- Sandeep Mehta as Narada
- Kishori Shahane Vij as Sumati/Sandhya/Chhaya
- Sameer Dharmadhikari as Priyavrata
- Roma Bali as Rohini/Barhismati
- Jyoti Joshi as Ila/Tapti
- Sandeep Mohan as Rama/Vajrasena
- Siraj Mustafa Khan as Krishna
- Sanjay Swaraj as Indra
- Shailey Chowdhary as Shachi
- Firdaus Mevawala as Brihaspati
- Bhakti Narula as Tara
- Santosh Kumar Shukla as Chandra
- Dharmendra Rana as Varuna
- Gautam Chaturvedi as Bhadrayu/Yudhishthira/Vasu
- Shalini Kapoor Sagar as Karkati
- Chand Dhar as Shukra
- Gajendra Chauhan as Daksha/Kartravirya Arjuna
- Kshama Raj as Prasuti/Ghritachi
- Virendra Razdan as Vishwakarma
- Nimai Bali as Jalandhara/Shani/ Duryodhana /Sindurasura
- Rajesh Shringarpore as Arjuna
- Gufi Paintal as Shakuni
- Sarvadaman D. Banerjee as Vrishadhvaja/Kannappa
- Upasana Singh as Mohini
- Kaushal Kapoor as Andhaka/ Kadamba
- Vaquar Shaikh as Ravana
- Manish Raj Sharma as Indrajita
- Sudhir Dalvi as Pulastya
- Pappu Polyester as Nandi
- Kulraj Bedi as Durgamasura / Kumbhakarna
- Raman Khatri as Vibhishana/Hiranyakashapu/ Bhasmasura
- Govind Khatri as Hiranyaksha / Rambha / Mount Meru
- Radhakrishna Dutta as Vidura / Markandeya / Dadhichi
- Pankaj Kalra as Durvasa
- Qasim Ali as Dushasana
- Navneet Chaddha as Nakula
- Keerti Gaekwad Kelkar as Draupadi
- Daman Maan as Mahishasura
- Utkarsha Naik as Kaikesi / Diti
- Arun Mathur as Sumali / Mount Mandara / Ruru / Mandhata
- Manish Sharma as Indrajita
- Amrit Pal as Tarakasura
- Mahendra Ghule as Kamalaksha / Bhima / Hanuman / Singhrasura
- Deepak Jethi as Vidyunmali
- Sanjeev Siddharth as Tarakaksha
- Prateek Bohara as Shumbha /Surya / Parshurama / Jamadagni
- Anil Yadav as Nishumbha / Parashurama
- Firoz Ali as Agni
- Renuka Israni as Ketumati
- Jitendra Trehan as Vasuki
- Arup Pal as Chitrangada/Kubera
- Jaya Mathur as Simantini
- Kirti Singh as Tilottama / Vrinda
- Sanjeev Sharma as Prahlada / Bhagiratha
- Sunila Karambelkar as Ganga
- Anita Hassanandani Reddy as Devayani
- Aparna Aaskarkar as Kanheri
- Mulraj Rajda as Bhadrasena
- Manoj Joshi as Shiva Charan, and father of Somadutta, and so called father Bhadrayu

== Soundtrack ==
Songs from many well-known Indian singers are featured in this serial; a few examples include the title song "Om Namah Shivay" (Pandit Jasraj), "Rudra Rudra" (Vinod Rathod and Udit Narayan, episode 53), and "Trikal Darsh" (episode 89), "Man Mein Ek Kamna" (episode 62), and "Maha Shivratri Aayi" (Alka Yagnik). Sharang Dev composed music and Abhilash provided lyrics.

== Home video ==
In 2003, Om Namah Shivay was released as a two-part, 42-DVD set, distributed by Madhu Entertainment and Media. It includes an option for English subtitles and a choice of four languages for audio (Hindi, Tamil, Telugu, and Malayalam).
