= Awaaz De Kahan Hai =

Awaaz De Kahan Hai आवाज़ दे कहाँ है
- Directed by: Sibte Hasan Rizvi
- Produced by: Riyaz Baba Qureishi
- Starring: Avinash Wadhavan; Shikha Swaroop
- Music by: Naushad
- Release date: 5 January 1990
- Country: India
- Language: Hindi

Awaaz De Kahan Hai is a 1990 Bollywood drama film directed by Sibte Hasan Rizvi, starring Avinash Wadhavan, Shikha Swaroop, Bindu and Satyen Kappu.

== Cast ==
- Avinash Wadhavan
- Shikha Swaroop
- Bindu
- Satyen Kappu
- A.K. Hangal
- Annu Kapoor
- Anjan Srivastav

== Soundtrack ==
All songs were penned by Hasan Kamal. The music was composed by Naushad Ali.

#	Title	Singer(s)
1	"Chali Re Chali Re Gori Chali Re"	Mohammed Aziz
2	"Chaha To Humne Magar"	Mohammed Aziz, Anuradha Paudwal
3	"Rulane Ko Aansu" (Male)	Mohammed Aziz
4	"Yaar Na Aaya Yaar Na Aaya"	Anuradha Paudwal, Mohammed Aziz
5	"Rulane Ko Aansu" (Female)	Anuradha Paudwal
6	"Aayi Re Holi Aayi"	Anuradha Paudwal, Mohammed Aziz
7	"Bhole Bhale Se Kuchh Matwale Se"	Mohammed Aziz
8	"Darpan Jo Dekha To Khud Se Lajayi"	Anuradha Paudwal
