= Mohabbat Ke Dushman =

- Promotional Poster
- Directed by: Prakash Mehra
- Screenplay by: Prakash Mehra; Laxmikant Sharma
- Produced by: Prakash Mehra
- Starring: Raaj Kumar; Hema Malini; Sanjay Dutt; Farah
- Cinematography: N. Satyen
- Edited by: Shyam Gupte
- Music by: Kalyanji-Anandji
- Release date: 20 May 1988
- Country: India
- Language: Hindi

Mohabbat Ke Dushman (transl. Enemy of love) is a 1988 Indian Hindi-language action film produced and directed by Prakash Mehra. It stars Raaj Kumar, Hema Malini, Sanjay Dutt, Farah in the lead roles.

== Plot ==
Circa 18th century India, the beauty of Shamajaan is widely known all over the region. This gets the interest of notorious Shahbaaz Khan, who decides to make her one more wife in his harem. He goes to her residence to woo her, but she indicates her unwillingness. Shahbaaz abducts her, killing her dad in the process, and takes him to his palace. Shamajaan manages to escape, and ends up at the palace of Ahmed Khan, where she is received and treated with respect, and is assured that Shahbaaz will not dare to attack anyone in the protection of Ahmed. Frustrated, Shahbaaz circulates that Shamajaan is one of his concubines, and when word of this gets to Ahmed's palace, the family has no choice except to turn Shamajaan out, and again at the mercy of Shahbaaz Khan.

== Cast ==
- Raaj Kumar as Rehmat Khan
- Hema Malini as Shamajaan
- Sanjay Dutt as Hashim
- Farah as Reshma
- Pran as Rustam
- Amrish Puri as Shahbaaz Khan
- Om Prakash as Pandit
- Suresh Oberoi as Abu Bhai
- Dina Pathak as Ammijaan
- Manjeet Kular as Raabiya

== Soundtrack ==
Song	Singer
"Allah Kare, Maula Kare"	Kishore Kumar
"Bahut Kat Chuka Hai"	Asha Bhosle
"Dil Khoya Khoya Gumsum"	Asha Bhosle
"Tumne Kaha Tha Hum Bin"	Asha Bhosle
"Mohabbat Ibaadat Hai" (Part 1)	Asha Bhosle
"Mohabbat Ibaadat Hai" (Part 2)	Asha Bhosle
"O Jaanu, Meri Jaan Bhi Tu Hai, Jaan To Kya, Imaan Bhi Tu Hai"	Suresh Wadkar, Alka Yagnik
"Na Teer Se Maaro, Na Talwaar Se Maaro, Dushman Ko Maarna Hai To Phir Pyar Se Maaro"	Suresh Wadkar, Alka Yagnik, Sadhana Sargam
