= Vikas Kapoor =

Indian author and director

- Born: Kanpur, India
- Occupations: Screenwriter; Author; Director; Producer

Vikas Kapoor is an Indian author, screenwriter, director, and producer based in Mumbai. He primarily works as a screenwriter in Hindi religious serials and shows. He has worked on Om Namah Shivaay, Shirdi K Sai Baba, Jai Shri Ganesh, and Jai Santoshi Maa. He has directed and produced feature films as well.

He had authored the books "Kaikeyi– Shri Ram Vanvas Keval Chaudah Varsh Kyon?", Sai Ki aatmkatha and Kundalini Jagran. He has also directed and produced shows and films.

He has won the President's award for the show Shirdi K Sai Baba and also termed as God's own writer by The Times of India. He has also won Top 50 Indian Icon Awards 2025 (T50IIA Awards).

== Early life and career ==
Vikas Kapoor was born in Swarup Nagar, Kanpur, India. He graduated from VSSD College and got his break as a screenwriter when Nitish Bharadwaj noticed him and offered him to write in his serial. He eventually kept writing for the religious serials and became an established writer.

== Filmography ==
=== Serials and mythological shows ===
Serial	Writer	TV Channel	Ref.
Om Namah Shivaay	Yes	DD National	
Jai Shri Ganesh	Yes	Sony Entertainment	
Jai Santoshi Maa	Yes	Zee TV	
Anantkoti Bramhandnayak Saibaba	Yes	DD Kisan	
Shrimad Bhagwat Mahapuran	Yes	Colors TV	
Achanak Uss Roz	Yes	Dangal	
Shobha Somnath ki	Yes	Zee TV	
Man Me Hai Vishwas	Yes	Sony TV	
Sai Bhakton Ki Sacchi Kahania	Yes	Sony TV	
Shri Chaitanya Mahaprabhu	Yes	yes	
Sunderkand	Yes	Zee Anmol	
Soone Soone Nayan	Yes	sahara TV	
Raavi aur magic mobile	Yes	Big Magic	
Kasak	Yes	DD National	
Mazhab Nahi Sikhata	Yes	DD National	
The Wheel of life	Yes	Zee Business	
Ramayana	Yes	NDTV Imagine	
Jap Tap Vrat	Yes	Star TV	
Om Namo Narayan	Yes	Sahara TV	
Jai Maa Vaishno Devi	Yes	9X	
Uplabdhiyan	Yes	DD National	
Geeta Rahasya	Yes	DD National	
Andhaa Yug	Yes	DD National	
Surya Puran	Yes	Mahua TV	
Savitri	Yes	DD Kisan	

=== Feature films ===
Film	Writer	Contribution	Ref.
Shirdi Ke Sai Baba	Yes	Story, Screenplay & Dialogues	
Sri Chaitanya Mahaprabhu	Yes	Story, Screenplay, Dialogues & Creative Direction	

== Bibliography ==
- Kaikeyi– Shri Ram Vanvas Keval Chaudah Varsh Kyon?
- Sai Ki Atmkatha
- Kundalini Jagran
- Kaaljaee
- Kanpur Bhumi Ka Bhugol (Approved for Class 6 & 7 syllabus)
- Sai Baba Comic Book

== Awards ==
- President Award– Best Film on National Integration (2002)
- Kala Shri Award– By then PM Shri Atal Bihari Vajpayee (1998)
- 50 Icon Award (2025)
- Prabha Shri Award– Kashi (2025)
