= Pyar Hua Chori Chori =

- Poster
- Directed by: K. Bapayya
- Story by: Priyadarshan
- Produced by: Ramesh Rao
- Starring: Mithun Chakraborty; Gautami; Shikha Swaroop; Shafi Inamdar; Shakti Kapoor; Anupam Kher
- Music by: Laxmikant–Pyarelal
- Production company: Anirudha Arts
- Release date: 7 June 1991
- Running time: 125 minutes
- Country: India
- Language: Hindi

Pyar Hua Chori Chori is a 1991 Indian Hindi-language romantic comedy film directed by K. Bapayya, starring Mithun Chakraborty, Gautami, Shikha Swaroop, Shafi Inamdar, Shakti Kapoor and Anupam Kher. This was Gautami's debut film in Hindi. It is a remake of the Malayalam film Chithram (1988). The film was a Superhit at the box office, proving Mithun Chakraborty's acting versatility.

== Plot ==
Vijay is looking for quick money for his son's operation. He is offered the "job" to act as a husband for a rich, wealthy girl Radha due to circumstances. The make-believe marriage evolves into love for each other. But Vijay has a dark past, which would hurt everyone. Can he manage to survive?

== Cast ==
- Mithun Chakraborty as Vijay Kumar
- Gautami as Radha
- Shakti Kapoor as Bishambhar
- Anupam Kher as Jhunjhunwala
- Shikha Swaroop as Vaishali Verma
- Satish Kaul as Jailor
- Shafi Inamdar as Vikram Singh / Raja Sahib
- Yunus Parvez as Shakura
- Viju Khote as Constable Verma
- Mehmood Jr. as Ramkishan
- Shubha Khote as Subhadra

== Songs ==
- "Pyar Hua Chori Chori" –

Alka Yagnik, Amit Kumar

- "Ja Re Ja O Besharam Chanda" –

Kavita Krishnamurthy, Amit Kumar

- "Aayi Bahar Phool Khilati" –

Suresh Wadkar, Jayshree Shriram

- "Aayo Re Aayo Nandlal" –

Hariharan, Suresh Wadkar

- "Teri Khamoshi Zuban Ban Gayi" –

Amit Kumar
