= Paandav =

1995 film by Raj N. Sippy

- Release poster
- Directed by: Raj N. Sippy
- Written by: Anand S. Vardhan
- Produced by: Keshu Ramsay
- Starring: Akshay Kumar; Nandini
- Cinematography: S. Pappu
- Edited by: V. N. Mayekar
- Music by: Jatin-Lalit
- Production company: DMS Films
- Release date: 3 March 1995
- Country: India
- Language: Hindi
- Budget: ₹1.5 crore
- Box office: ₹2.9 crore

Paandav is a 1995 Indian Hindi-language action drama film directed by Raj N. Sippy. It stars Akshay Kumar, Pankaj Dheer and Nandini in lead roles.

== Plot ==
Inspector Vijay lives with his elder brother, Assistant Commissioner of Police, Ashwini Kumar; and sister-in-law, Jyoti, in an upper middle-class community in India. Assigned an investigation, which leads Vijay to conclude that the crime was committed by K.K. Kelva's man, he risks his life to arrest him, and hold him in prison until such time a date is fixed for a court hearing. Vijay also interrogates his prisoner, often using excessive force. Shortly thereafter, Vijay is instructed to release the prisoner – and the person who instructs him thus is no other than his very own brother, Ashwini, who it seems on the pay-roll of Kelva and his gangsters. What can Vijay possibly do to bring an end to this illicit relationship?

== Cast ==
- Akshay Kumar as Inspector Vijay Kumar
- Nandini as Ritu
- Kanchan as Nisha Tiwari
- Pankaj Dheer as Hariya
- Mukesh Khanna as ACP Ashwini Kumar
- Kiran Kumar as K.K.Kelva
- Prithvi as Ajay
- Ajinkya Deo as Captain Vikas Sood
- Surendra Pal as Daata
- Manjeet Kullar as Mrs. Jyoti Ashwini Kumar
- Sudhir Pandey as Commissioner J. K. Srivastav
- Anil Nagrath as Home Minister Purshotam Sinha
- Bhushan Jeevan as A.C.P. Chaugle
- Shiva as David
- Aasif Sheikh as A.K.
- Bob Christo as K.K's henchman

== Soundtrack ==
#	Title	Singer(s)	Lyricist(s)
1	"Tere Liye Rehta Hai"	Kumar Sanu, Alka Yagnik	Vinoo Mahendra
2	"Aaj Main Ye Izhaar Karoon"	Kumar Sanu, Kavita Krishnamurthy	Shyam Raj
3	"Sapne Sajaakar Apna Banakar"	Devki Pandit	Mahendra Dehlvi
4	"Pyar Ka Andaz Tum"	Udit Narayan, Devki Pandit	Majrooh Sultanpuri
5	"Kasam Hai Pyar Ki Tumhe"	Kumar Sanu, Devki Pandit	Mahendra Dehlvi
6	"Ye Haina Pyaar Hi To Haina"	Amit Kumar, Sadhana Sargam	Majrooh Sultanpuri
7	"Ye Chaman Jo Jal Gaya"	Udit Narayan, Amit Kumar	Majrooh Sultanpuri
8	"Trailer O Trailer"	Alisha Chinai, Anu Malik	Anwar Sagar
