= Do Ankhen Barah Hath =

- Directed by: Kirti Kumar
- Written by: Aadesh K. Arjun (dialogues)
- Story by: Keshav Rathod
- Produced by: Shashee Prabhoo
- Starring: Govinda; Madhuvanti; Sadashiv Amrapurkar
- Cinematography: Anil Dhanda
- Edited by: Kuldip MEhan
- Music by: Bappi Lahiri
- Production company: Sri Nirmaladevi Combines
- Release date: 11 July 1997
- Language: Hindi

Do Ankhen Barah Hath (English: Two Eyes Twelve Hands) is a 1997 Indian action drama film directed by Kirti Kumar. The movie stars Govinda, Madhuvanti, Aruna Irani and Sadashiv Amrapurkar.

== Plot ==
Wealthy Sharda is in love with poor Vinod Kumar and would like to marry him. But her gangster brother, Vishwanath Dayaram refuses to permit her, as he would like her to marry Nano, a garage owner and fellow-gangster, with whom he already has arranged her marriage. So Vishwanath gets Vinod killed, and Sharda, who is pregnant, runs away and gives birth to a baby boy, from whom she separates. Vishwanath has sent his men to kill Sharda and her child at any cost, but she continues to elude them.

Twenty years later Sharda does meet her brother—who is just on the verge of killing Sagar—who is none other than her estranged long-lost son.

== Cast ==
- Govinda as Sagar
- Johnny Lever as Rickshaw walla
- Arun Govil as Police Inspector
- Madhuvanti Patwardhan as Vidya - (Bhagyashree's sister)
- Rupali Ganguly as Neeta Dayaram: Vishwanath's daughter; Raman's wife
- Raman Khatri as Raman: Neeta's husband
- Lilliput as Balla: Sagar's friend
- Aruna Irani as Sharda
- Sadashiv Amrapurkar as Vishwanath Dayaram
- Asrani as Jagjivan Ram Barjatya
- Anil Dhawan as Vinod Kumar
- Ishrat Ali as Nano
- Arjun as Police Inspector
- Kiran Kumar as Daman Sood
- Harish Patel as Keshav Bapu Darwaza
- Akhilendra Mishra as "Kumar Khidki" Keshav Bapu's Son

== Music ==
#	Song title	Singers
1	"Mile Jo Tere Naina"	Alka Yagnik, Kumar Sanu
2	"Jo Bhi Dekhe Aap Ko"	Kavita Krishnamurthy, Kumar Sanu
3	"Ho Gaya Ji Ho Gaya"	Kavita Krishnamurthy, Kumar Sanu
4	"Ae Mausam Suhane Suhane"	Abhijeet Bhattacharya, Alka Yagnik
5	"De De De De"	Sudesh Bhosle
6	"Fursat Mile Toh"	Govinda
7	"Karte Hain Hum Pyaar"	Kirti Kumar, Alka Yagnik
8	"Kasam Se Kasam Se"	Alka Yagnik, Kumar Sanu
9	"Tere Baap Ko"	Govinda
