= Chal Chalein =

- Original DVD Cover
- Directed by: Ujjwal Singh
- Written by: Vijaya Ramchandrula
- Produced by: Mahesh Padalkar
- Starring: Mithun Chakraborty; Chirag P Ruia; Mukesh Khanna; Rati Agnihotri; Shilpa Shukla; Kanwaljeet Singh
- Cinematography: Arvind Kumar
- Edited by: Aseem Sinha
- Music by: Ilaiyaraaja
- Release date: 7 August 2009
- Running time: 148 minutes
- Country: India
- Language: Hindi

Chal Chalein is a 2009 Indian Hindi-language film directed by Ujjwal Singh and produced by Mahesh Padalkar, starring Mithun Chakraborty, Rati Agnihotri, Mukesh Khanna and Kanwaljeet Singh in a story about the academic pressures on children.

== Plot ==
A student commits suicide because of extreme anxiety over pressure from his dad to get good grades. The student's empathetic friends enlist the help of a lawyer named Sanjay (Mithun Chakraborty) to speak up against the parents, the government and the school system. The case draws national attention and generates massive public opinion.

== Production ==
Chakraborty (prosecuting lawyer) worked again with his 1980s romantic films co-star Rati Agnihotri (student's mother). Their previous films included Pasand Apni Apni, Shaukeen, and Boxer.

== Cast ==
- Mithun Chakraborty as Prosecuting Lawyer
- Mukesh Khanna as Justice Bharat Kumar
- Rati Agnihotri as Student's mother
- Nishikant Dixit as Father
- Syed Hussain Haider Abidi as Sunny
- Tanvi Hegde as Vaishnavi
- Shilpa Shukla
- Kanwaljeet Singh
- Vishwajeet Pradhan
- Anup Soni
- Anand Abhyankar
- Reema Worah as Sona

== Soundtrack ==
Maestro Illayaraja provided the film score for this film and lyrics written by Piyush Mishra.

=== Track listing ===
No.	Title	Singer(s)	Length
1.	"Tum Bhi Dhoondna"	Hariharan
2.	"Shehar Hai Khoob Kya Hai"	Shaan, Shreya Ghoshal & Krishna
3.	"Jhoom Jhoom So Ja"	Sadhna Sargam
4.	"Gup Chup Shaam Thi"	Hariharan
5.	"Chal Chal Chal Ke"	Aditya Narayan, Kavita Krishnamurthy & Krishna
6.	"Batladein Koi"	Aditya Narayan, Shaan, Sunidhi Chauhan & Krishna
7.	"Uff Are Tu Mirch Hai"	Shaan, Shreya Ghoshal & Krishna
Total length:			28:48
