= Vaishnavi Macdonald =

Indian actress

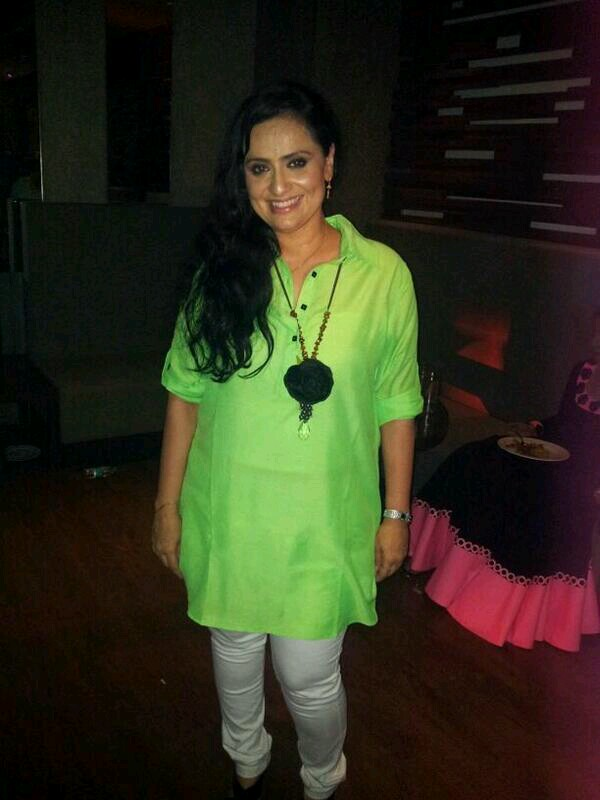
- Macdonald in 2014
- Born: Vaishnavi Mahant; Bombay, Maharashtra, India
- Occupation: Actress
- Years active: 1988–present
- Known for: Shaktimaan, Miley Jab Hum Tum, Sapne Suhane Ladakpan Ke
- Spouse: Leslie Macdonald
- Children: 1

Vaishnavi Macdonald (née Mahant) is an Indian film and TV actress who is best known for playing Geeta Viswas in Mukesh Khanna's television series Shaktimaan, telecasted on Doordarshan. She is currently seen in Dangal's recently launched Aye Mere Humsafar. She has acted in various Bollywood films such as Bambai Ka Babu, opposite Saif Ali Khan, Ladlaa and Barsaat Ki Raat (1998). She is also known for playing Shilpa Sharma in Miley Jab Hum Tum, Shail in the Zee TV show Sapne Suhane Ladakpan Ke and Leela Taneja in the television series Tashan-E-Ishq.

== Early life and career ==
As a child she moved to Hyderabad where she decided to become a scientist. However, while vacationing in Mumbai, she had the opportunity to appear in the Ramsay Brothers' horror film Veerana and decided to pursue acting as a profession. She subsequently appeared in Barsaat Ki Raat, Ladlaa, Maidan-E-Jung, Bambai Ka Babu, Daanveer and Oru Mutham Manimutham.

From 1998 to 2005, she played the female lead Geeta Vishwas in the superhero series Shaktimaan on Doordarshan. The show, as well as her character, got high acclaim and was considered her breakthrough role. When her journalist character Geeta Vishwas was written out of the series, fan protests prompted the producers to bring her back. In 2000, she played the role of ACP Ratna, a daring police officer in the comedy serial Raju Raja Rajasaab on Sahara TV.

She went on to play leading roles in several Telugu films.

She played the role of Sameera's mother Sapna in Chhoona Hai Aasmaan and Bhaskar's mother in the Sony Entertainment Television serial Bhaskar Bharti. She also appeared in Karmyudh on Doordarshan in the role of Inspector Shivangi Chauhan.

She is married to Leslie Macdonald and has a daughter.

== Filmography ==
=== Films ===
Year	Title	Role	Notes
1988	Veerana	Child Jasmine Pratap	
1994	Laadla	Item girl in song Ladki hai kya	
1995	Maidan-E-Jung	Radha	
1996	Bambai Ka Babu	Anita	
1996	Daanveer	Sudha	
1997	Oru Mutham Manimutham	Lekha	Malayalam Movie
1998	Barsaat Ki Raat	Rangeeli	
2001	Dal – The Gang	Reshma	
2006	Baabul		
2006	Mata	Swamini ("dil wanted" song)	Kannada movie
2008	Saanchaa		
2011	Mummy Punjabi	Amrita (Jackie Shroff's wife)	
2014	Super Nani	Mann's mother	
2017	Who Is the First Wife of My Father	Nikita	
2018	Raja Abroadiya	Prakash Kaur	
2019	Dosti Ke Side Effects	Shristi's mother	
2019	Hansa Ek Sanyog		

=== Television ===
Year	Title	Role
1998–2005	Shaktimaan	Geeta Vishwas
1998–1999	Main Dilli Hoon	Sanyogita
1998	Saturday Suspense	
1998	X Zone	
1998	Awaz Ki Duniya	Herself (co-anchor)
1999	Naagin	Cameo
1999	Baat Ban Jaaye	Guest appearance
1999	Zee Horror Show – The Party	
2000	Raju Raja Rajashaab	ACP Ratna
2000	Naqab	
2001	Dushman	
2001	Chingaari	
2001	Gharana	
2001	Choti Maa – Ek Anokha Bandhan	Sharda/Shakti
2001	Chandan Ka Palna Resham Ki Dori	Shreya
2001	Suraag – The Clue	
2004	Dekho Magar Pyaar Se	Priyanka
2004	K. Street Pali Hill	Ishita Khandelwal
2005	Kasautii Zindagii Kay	Madhavi Bose/Madhavi Vineet Khanna
2005–2007	Ek Ladki Anjaani Si	Meera Sachdev
2007	Mamta	Vasundhara
2007–2008	Chhoona Hai Aasmaan	Sapna/Anupama Singh
2007–2008	Kahe Naa Kahe	Urmila
2008	Saas v/s Bahu	Contestant
2008–2010	Miley Jab Hum Tum	Shilpa Sharma
2009	Mere Ghar Aayi Ek Nanhi Pari	
2009	Bhaskar Bharti	Bhaskar's mother
2010	Bairi Piya	Sunanda Devi Pundir
2010	Karmyudh	Shivangi Chauhan
2010	Sapnon Se Bhare Nena	Anjali
2010–2012	Sasural Genda Phool	Suhana's Mother
2011	Maa Exchange	Herself
2012–2015	Sapne Suhane Ladakpan Ke	Shail Garg
2015–2016	Tashan-E-Ishq	Leela Taneja
2016	Pardes Mein Hai Mera Dil	Cameo Role
2017–2018	Dil Se Dil Tak	Indu Bhanushali
2017–2018	Hum Paanch Phir Se	Parikrama
2017–2019	Yeh Un Dinon Ki Baat Hai	Vishakha Maheshwari Somani
2017	Savdhaan India	
2018	Mitegi Laxman Rekha	Devyani
2019–2020	Divya Drishti	Mahima Shergill aka Laal Chakor
2020–2021	Aye Mere Humsafar	Surajmukhi Sharma
2020	Shaadi Mubarak	Mrs. Gopalani
2021	Kyun Utthe Dil Chhod Aaye	Zahida Iqbal Baig
2021	Tera Yaar Hoon Main	Shobha Roy
2021–2022	Meet: Badlegi Duniya Ki Reet	Anubha Ashok Hooda
2022	Banni Chow Home Delivery	Vandana Hemant Singh Rathore
2022–2025	Parineetii	Parminder Rajveer Bajwa
2025-Present	Rimjhim	Rani Sa

== Publications ==
- Macdonald, Vaishnavi. The Invisible Hand of God. ISBN 979-8-6696-6456-5.
- Macdonald, Vaishnavi. The Cinderella Effect: Nothing Here is Forever. Pen It! Publications, LLC. ISBN 978-1-954868-15-1.
