= Agnee Morcha =

1997 film directed by Raju Chouhan

- Directed by: Raju Chouhan
- Written by: Raju Chouhan, Vinay Mahajan (Dialogue)
- Screenplay by: Vinay Mahajan
- Produced by: Rajesh Kothari
- Starring: Dharmendra; Mukesh Khanna; Ravi Kishan; Simran
- Cinematography: Nand Kumar Chowdhary
- Edited by: Prashant Khedekar, Vinod Nayak
- Music by: Shyam - Surendra
- Release date: 4 April 1997
- Running time: 142 minutes
- Country: India
- Language: Hindi

Agnee Morcha is a Hindi action movie of Bollywood starring Dharmendra, Ravi Kishan & Mukesh Khanna, directed by Raju Chauhan and produced by Rajesh Kothari. This film was released on 4 April 1997 under the banner of Shiv Dolly Films.

== Cast ==
- Dharmendra as Kishan Singh Bhatti
- Mukesh Khanna as Saleem
- Ravi Kishan
- Simran as Mantri
- Johnny Lever
- Raza Murad
