= Oru Mutham Manimutham =

- Directed by: Sajan
- Written by: Unnikrishnan Chozhiyakkodu; Mani Shornur (dialogues)
- Screenplay by: Mani Shornur
- Produced by: George Karyathu; Mahima Ramachandran
- Starring: Mukesh; Vaishnavi MacDonald; Srividya; KPAC Lalitha; Harishree Ashokan
- Cinematography: Prathapan
- Edited by: K. K. Balan
- Music by: Raveendran
- Production company: Mahima Movies
- Distributed by: Mahima Movies
- Release date: 1997
- Country: India
- Language: Malayalam

Oru Mutham Manimutham is a 1997 Indian Malayalam-language film, directed by Sajan and produced by George Karyathu and Mahima Ramachandran. The film stars Mukesh, Vaishnavi MacDonald, Srividya, KPAC Lalitha and Harishree Ashokan in the lead roles. The film has musical score by Raveendran Master.

== Plot ==
Balachandran lives with his widowed mother Lakshmi, grandmother, her two middle aged sons Madhavan and Sreedharan, and their wives Sarada and Savithri respectively. The two middle-aged couples have been lacking kids so far and is yet actively trying to give birth, the whole family longing for kids as an obsession. Madhavan is a traditional healer while Sreedharan and Balachandran are teachers at the local school. Balachandran is devoted to his granny and his family in general, and his life and dreams revolve around family sentiments.

The domestic help, Kumaran, has an acute short-term memory problem, which regularly leads to hilarious situations. For eg., when Savithri once vomits and is suspected to be pregnant, he runs off to inform the men of the family at their workplaces, but in his condition, reports various women to be pregnant to various men - while Madhavan is told that his wife Sarada is pregnant, Kumaran reports at Sreedharan and Balachandran's school that Sreedharan is set to be a dad and that Ammutty, the domestic help is pregnant, to his humiliation before coworkers. (It turned out Savithri just had an upset stomach that time, by the way.)

While they are looking for a bride for Balachandran, granny chances upon an advertisement on TV featuring a beautiful model with familiar face, and it turns out to be Lekha Menon, Lakshmi's brother Krishna Menon's daughter, and thereby Balachandran's cross-cousin (marriageable by South Indian custom) who is pursuing a modelling career at Bangalore. Granny immediately decides that she'd be Balachandran's bride.

Krishna Menon is happy with the alliance, and even feels an obligation to yield because the family had helped him a lot during his early days. Lekha, however, had dreams of an extended modelling career is devastated when she is abruptly called back home and announced to be a would be bride within the month, even arrangements for the wedding happening without her consent. Lekha meets Balachandran and mentions her non-consent. Inexplicably, instead of reporting things as such to his family, a stupid Balachandran tries telling them that he suddenly doesn't like Lekha anymore, but of course this doesn't sell, especially with his toxic granny who goes on a hunger strike. Apparently due to his ego in admitting the girl rejected him, Balachandran refuses to reveal the truth to his family and instead try to convince Lekha to a marriage with him on her terms. An overwhelmed Lekha is finally forced to agree to the marriage, on the secret agreement with Balachandran that they wouldn't be consummating the marriage any time soon, and that she will be allowed to pursue her modelling career.

As we learn later, Balachandran wasn't a bit serious when he promised Lekha anything, but was expecting to be able to change her mind once the wedding was done, using melodrama as usual.

The marriage finally happens. On their first night, Balachandran expects to be able to seduce the beautiful Lekha but naturally she does not relent, apparently denying him "even a kiss". This continues overdays. To be fair, the feisty Lekha does show off her sexy assets and tempt Balachandran quite a bit too. Meanwhile the other family members mistake innocuous sounds Lekha makes and her exercising as steamy sex between them and expect them to be having a steamy relationship.

However, soon, Balachandran is forced to confess to Sreedharan who, instead of realising their combined folly in trapping an uninterested career woman in a marriage she did not want, conspires with Balachandran to make Lekha yield to the latter by hook or crook. When cliched tricks fail, they decide to drug Lekha with a heavy traditional sexual stimulant drug from Madhavan, resulting in hilarious sequences and a very interesting night. Kumaran's short term memory loss results in the drug being fed to Sarada first, and when a second cup is about to be consumed by his wife Savithri, Sreedharan panics and drinks the potion himself. Soon enough, a hyper-stimulated Sarada corners an unsuspecting Madhavan, while Sreedharan take out his lust on poor Savithri all night. Balachandran is left alone to fend for himself but he manages to slip a thir pellet into Lekha's drink and feed her, resulting in her getting stimulated as planned. Balachandran exploits the opportunity well to seduce a sexually stimulated Lekha in bed, popping her virgin cherry finally and satisfying all his prolonged sexual urges on her over the night.

In the morning, a dazed Lekha finds herself sore and is shocked to see herself in her innerware. Watching a cocky Balachandran on her treadmill, she realises she has been taken and cries, helpless now that all is over. As expected, she gets pregnant from that single night, to her utter dismay. While Balachandran and family cherish the news, Lekha inexplicably tries all hook and crook to have the baby aborted, unsuccessfully. At a fix, she is forced to reveal that she was under a legal agreement with an advertising agency to not conceive or even marry for a prescribed number of years when they trapped her in this marriage. Fernandez, the advertising executive arrives with a legal warning. Instead of realising their folly, Balachandran's family, and Krishna Menon try to intimidate Fernandez at first, and when that fails miserably, they try to appeal to his melodramatic sense by working out family sentiments. At the end, granny succeeds in making Fernandez fall for her toxicity and the poor man leaves without either money or model.

The film ends on an apparent happy note when Lekha delivers successfully and she too survives the ordeal.

== Cast ==
- Mukesh as Balachandran
- Vaishnavi MacDonald as Lekha Menon
- Srividya as Lakshmi, Balachandran's mother
- KPAC Lalitha as granny
- Harishree Ashokan as Kumaran, the help
- CP Prathapan as Madhavan, granny's elder son
- Janardanan as Sreedharan, granny's second son
- Ramadevi as Sarada, Madhavan's wife
- K. R. Vatsala as Savithri, Sreedharan's wife
- Lalu Alex as Fenandez
- N. F. Varghese as Krishna Menon
- Thesni Khan as Ammutti
- Prathapachandran
- Valsala Menon

== Soundtrack ==
The music was composed by Raveendran with lyrics by O. N. V. Kurup.

No.	Song	Singers	Lyrics	Length (m:ss)
1	"Devi Neeyen"	K. J. Yesudas	O. N. V. Kurup	
2	"Ee Gaanam Kelkkaathe"	K. S. Chithra	O. N. V. Kurup	
3	"Omanathinkalurangoo"	K. J. Yesudas	O. N. V. Kurup	
4	"Omanathinkalurangoo" [F]	K. S. Chithra	O. N. V. Kurup	
5	"Poovittallo"	K. S. Chithra, M. G. Sreekumar	O. N. V. Kurup	
6	"Poovittallo" [F]	K. S. Chithra, Chorus	O. N. V. Kurup	
