= The Legacy of Mahaveer =

- Directed by: Pradeep P. Jadhav & Vivek Iyer
- Story by: Abhishek Maloo
- Produced by: Abhishek Maloo
- Starring: Surendra Pal; Manish Bishla; Sharad Gore; Sanyog Sogani; Aanand Dev
- Cinematography: Amit R. Malviya
- Edited by: Vijay N Panchal
- Music by: Vivian Richard & Vipin Patwa
- Production company: Mahaveer Talkies
- Release date: 27 October 2023
- Country: India
- Language: Hindi

The Legacy Of Mahaveer is a 2023 Indian Hindi mythological, historical film produced by Abhishek Maloo was released in theaters on 27 October 2023.

== Synopsis ==
In the era of Vikram Samvat 1080 (1023 AD), Jain Muni Acharya Vardhman Suri came to know about the evil deeds and wickedness of Chaityavaas supremo Suracharya, thus he teams up with his ascetic duo disciples, Jineshwar Suri and Buddhisagar, to establish faith and righteousness of Khartargach.

== Cast ==
- Swayam Joshi as Shreedhar
- Surendra Pal as Raj Durlabh Singh
- Manish Bishla as Vardhman Suri
- Sharad Gore as Suracharya
- Sanyog Sogani as Bheem
- Aanand Dev as Rajpurohit

== Production ==
Under the Banner of Mahaveer Talkies the film is a Mythological, Historical drama produced by Abhishek Maloo and directed by Pradeep P. Jadhav & Vivek Iyer. The story is by Abhishek Maloo and screenplay Beybaar (formerly known as Prashant Beybaar), music is given by Vivian Richard & Vipin Patwa, lyrics by Beybaar, and Background Score by Swapnil Choudhari. Cinematography by Amit R. Malviya and Editing by Vijay N Panchal. The film has been shot at various location of Mumbai, Umbergaon.
