= Cheetah (1994 film) =

- Film poster
- Directed by: Harmesh Malhotra
- Written by: Ravi Kapoor
- Produced by: Rajiv Babbar
- Starring: Mithun Chakraborty; Ashwini Bhave; Shikha Swaroop; Prem Chopra
- Cinematography: Shyam Rao
- Music by: Jatin–Lalit
- Production company: Aabha Films
- Release date: 24 June 1994 (India)
- Running time: 135 minutes
- Country: India
- Language: Hindi
- Budget: ₹2.10 crore
- Box office: ₹6.76 crore (India Net Collection) ₹ 16 Crore (Worldwide)

Cheetah is a 1994 Indian Hindi-language action film directed by Harmesh Malhotra starring Mithun Chakraborty, Ashwini Bhave, Shikha Swaroop, Prem Chopra and Raza Murad. The film's theme is based on the 1990 film Hard to Kill and was later remade as Ram Shastra.

== Cast ==
- Mithun Chakraborty as Police Inspector Amar
- Ashwini Bhave as Doctor Anita Kedarnath
- Rakesh Bedi as Lachhoo
- Shikha Swaroop as Rajni Kamalnath
- Prem Chopra as Jaimal
- Gulshan Grover as Police Inspector Sher Singh
- Raza Murad as Kedarnath
- Puneet Issar as ACP Khurana
- Goga Kapoor as DCP Rajeshwar (Amar's Father)
- Guddi Maruti
- Deep Dhillon as Inspector Gupta
- Shammi as Nurse
- Jayshri T as an item number
- Disco Shanti as an item number
- Vikas Anand as Inspector Kamalnath - Rajni's dad
- Gurbachan

== Soundtrack ==
The music was composed by Jatin-Lalit.

#	Title	Singer(s)	Lyricist(s)
2	"Yeh Tera Sajna Savarna"	Kumar Sanu, Alka Yagnik	Anwar Sagar
1	"Chu Chu Chu"	Ila Arun, Poornima	Manoj Darpan
4	"Yeh Kudi Mera Dil Le Gayee"	Kumar Sanu, Alka Yagnik	Dev Kohli
3	"Meri Chunri Lehrayee"	Alka Yagnik	Zameer Kazmi
6	"Premium Kashm Kash Badi Toh"	Poornima	Dev Kohli
5	"Ya Habibi Mehbooba Teri Mahjabi"	Sonu Nigam, Kavita Krishnamurthy	Dev Kohli
