= Maryada... of an Indian family =

- Promotional logo
- Created by: ANKK Media Arts
- Directed by: Yatindra Rawat & Ashok K. Kotwani
- Starring: Jyoti Makker; Vineet Raina; Akshat Gupta; Asha Sharma; Kiran Kumar; Saheba Khan
- Opening theme: "Maryada" by Aslam Surty
- Country of origin: India
- Original language: Hindi
- No. of seasons: 1
- No. of episodes: 395

Production
- Running time: approx. 23 minutes

Original release
- Network: TV Asia
- Release: 2007 – 2009

Maryada...of an Indian family is a Hindi TV serial that aired on TV Asia from 2007 until 2009, based on the story of a 19-year-old girl Meenakshi, who is a real life example of tradition in which she tries to change herself to save relationships with her dad's family.

== Plot ==
One day Surendra migrates to London to get away from his brother Veerpratap's mockings, while his wife stays in India. There he meets a woman whom he starts liking; they get married. Time goes by and Surendra's first wife, who stays in India, delivers a son named Vikram. The wife in London delivers a daughter named Meenakshi.

Unfortunately, one day Surendra and his wife dies in an accident in London. Their last wish is to get their ashes immersed in India. To fulfill their wish, Meenakshi comes to India with her parents' ashes. There she goes to her dad's family's house as he had told her to. The family does not accept her, especially Veerpratap Singh, and they want her to go back as soon as possible. Meenakshi stays in the house to convince everyone in the family to perform the last rituals for her parents. Leisurely, she convinces her uncles Veerpratap and Rajvir to perform the ritual. But Rajvir and Veerpratap are shocked when Meenakshi expresses her desire that her mother should get her due respect in this house. In spite of all that, she makes it happen. In the bargain Meenaskhi causes clashes at home.

Meenakshi gradually makes a good impression, but complications arise when her boyfriend, whom she met in London, arrives at the same house as Krishna. Krishna is Veerpratap's son and Meenakshi's cousin. It is later revealed that Krishna was adopted and that they are not biological siblings. Meenakshi must then reconsider her relationship and make decisions about her future.

Meenasksi cannot stop loving Krishna, and Krishna loves Meenakshi. Now uncle fixed Meenashi's wedding with a guy in outside family. The question remains that how Meenakshi finds her love? How will she keep her tradition alive?

== Cast ==
- Jyoti Makker ... Neelakshi
- Vineet Raina / Akshat Gupta ... Krishna (Krish)
- Asha Sharma ... Maa Saheba
- Kiran Kumar ... Veerpratap Singh
- Saheba Khan ... Padma
- Surendra Pal ... Rajvir Singh
- Shashi Sharma ... Roopvati
- Afzaal Khan ... Vikram
- Monika Kale ... Rimzim
- Mukesh Khanna ... Vishal
- S. M. Zaheer ... Rana Sahab
- Jayshree T. ... Sandhya
- Jaya Binju ... Kali (worker in the office)
- Meena Sharma ... Raziyappa
- Nitin Keswani ... Vinith
- Tej Sapru ... Vijay
- Rachana Mutreja ... Laxmi
- Shruti Bhattacharya ... Urmi (House-maid)
- Kapil Soni ... Nikhil
- Jayashree ... Sony
