= Surendra Pal =

Indian actor

Surendrapal Singh
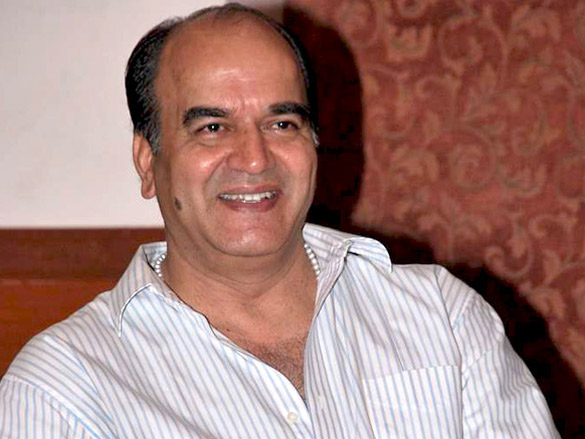
- Pal in 2010
- Born: 25 September 1953 (age 73); Lucknow, Uttar Pradesh, India
- Occupation: Actor
- Years active: 1981–present
- Spouse: Barkha Sharma Singh (m. 1996; div. 2002)
- Children: 3

Surendrapal Singh (born 25 September 1953) is an Indian film and television character actor who works in Hindi films and TV series. He is best known for his roles of Dronacharya in Mahabharat, Amatya Rakshas in Chanakya, Tamraj Kilvish in Shaktiman and Daksha in Devon Ke Dev...Mahadev.

Starting in 1984, Pal has worked in numerous films (Khuda Gawah, Sehar and Jodhaa Akbar) and television serials such as Woh Rehne Waali Mehlon Ki, Left Right Left and Vishnu Puran, where he played the role of Guru Shukracharya, teacher of the demons.

One of his most notable roles on TV was that of Vikranta Jabbar, which he played in Ramsay Brothers horror TV serial Zee Horror Show's episode Saya.

In 2007, Pal started a production company to produce and direct Bhojpuri films. He produced a Bhojpuri film Bhauji Ke Sister.

== Filmography ==
All films were in Hindi.

Year	Film	Role
1981	Krodhi	Victor
1981	Khuda Kasam	Chouhan
1984	Grahasthi	
1984	Manzil Manzil	
1985	Paapi Sansar	
1985	Maa Kasam	SANAM TERI KASAM (2000 FILM)
1985	Ghulami	Daku Suraj Bhan
1988	Ek Naya Rishta	Vikram
1988	Aakhri Nischay	
1988	Tamas	Shah Nawaz
1990	Tejaa	
1990	Shaitani Ilaaka	
1991	Aakhri Cheekh	
1991	Kurbaan	
1991	Vishkanya	
1992	Khuda Gawah	
1993	Platform	
1995	Policewala Gunda	
1995	Veergati	
1995	Paandav	
1995	Prayikkara Pappan (Malayalam)	
1996	Return of Jewel Thief	
1996	Mr. Romeo (Tamil)	
1996	Rajali (Tamil)	
1997	Judge Mujrim	
1998	Hafta Vasuli	
2001	Maharaani	
2001	Indian	
2003	Dhund: The Fog	
2004	Bardaasht	
2004	Lakshya	Lt. General, IMA Commandant
2004	Ab Tumhare Hawale Watan Saathiyo	Brigadier Rakesh Malhotra
2005	Sehar	Ramnath Mishra
2005	Jo Bole So Nihaal	Balwant Singh
2007	Aseema: Beyond Boundaries	
2008	Jodhaa Akbar	Rana Uday Singh
2008	Tathagatha Buddha	Suddhodana
2010	Aasal	
2010	Rann Neeti-The Conspiracy Plan	
2010	Binu Sheela Sunila	
2010	Aisan Pyar Se Dekhbu T Pyar Ho Jai	
2013	Mahabharat Aur Barbareek	Drona
2014	Gurjar Aandolan	Nageena Singh
2016	Airlift	External Affairs Minister
2016	1920 London	Shivangi's father
2018	Maa Tujhe Salaam	
2023	The Legacy of Mahaveer	

== Television ==
Year	Serial	Role	Channel
1988	Bharat Ek Khoj	Man Singh (Episode 32 & 33); Dara Shikoh (Episode 35 & 36)	DD National
1989–1990	Mahabharat	Dronacharya	DD National
1991	Chanakya	Mahamatya Rakshas (Mahamatya Katyayan)	DD National
1994	Zee Horror Show Episode:- Saaya	Vikranta Jabbar	Zee TV
1994	Zee Horror Show Episode:- Dhund (The Fog)	Avinash	Zee TV
1997–2005	Shaktimaan	Tamraj Kilvish	DD National
2010	Agnipareeksha – Jeevan Ki Gangaa		Colors TV
2015	Suryaputra Karn	Parashurama	Sony Entertainment Television
2015	Adhikaar ek kasam ek tapasya		
2016 – 2017	Jaana Na Dil Se Door	Amarkant “Dadaji” Vashisht	Star Plus
2017	Chandrakanta (2017)	King Avantimala	Colors TV
2022	Na Umra Ki Seema Ho	Pratap	Star Bharat
2023 – 2024	Teri Meri Doriyaann	Akaal Singh Brar	Star Plus
2024	Shrimad Ramayan	Maharishi Vashisht	Sony Entertainment Television
2024	Pracchand Ashok	Samrat Chandragupta Maurya	Colors TV
1997–2005	Shaktimaan	Tamraj Kilvish	DD National
1997	Amanat (Indian TV series)		Zee TV
2005	C.I.D. (India TV series)	D.C.P. (episodes 366, 367, 369, 378, 380, 388, 390)|	Sony TV
2000	Vishnu Puran (TV series)	Shukracharya	Zee TV
2000	Zee Horror Show: Anhonee Episode:- Telephone		Zee TV
2002	Ramayan (2002 TV series)	Ravana	Zee TV
2001–2004	Shagun	Kailashnath	Star Plus
	Vishnupuran	Guru Shukracharya	Zee TV
2003	Urmila		
2003	Kunti		
2006	Dharti Ka Veer Yodha Prithviraj Chauhan		Star Plus
	Kumkum (TV series)	Chandumal Mishra	Star Plus
2006	Left Right Left (TV series)	Virendra Rai Chauhan	SAB TV
	Woh Rehne Waali Mehlon Ki	Guruji	Sahara One
2007	Maryada... of an Indian family	Rajvir Singh	Star Plus
	Chotti Bahu	Mr. Purohit	Zee TV
2008	Neeli Aankhen		Sahara One
2008	Sujata (TV series)	M.D. Shah	Sony TV
	Waqt Batayega Kaun Apna Kaun Paraya	Sarvadaman Raichawdhury	Star Plus
	Santaan		Star Plus
	Babul Ka Aangann Chootey Na		Sony TV
	Love u Zindagi		Star Plus
	Ma Shakti	Rakthabija, Rambha (Mahishasur's father)	
2011	Devon Ke Dev...Mahadev	Daksha	Life OK
	Diya Aur Baati Hum		Star Plus
	Desh Ki Beti Nandini	Inderraj Raghuvanshi	Sony TV
	Bharat Ka Veer Putra – Maharana Pratap	Rao Maldeo Rathore	Sony TV
2013–2014	Pradhanmantri	B. R. Ambedkar	ABP News
2016	Siya Ke Ram	Vishrava (father of Ravana)	Star Plus
	Prithvi Vallabh − Itihaas Bhi, Rahasya Bhi	Guru Vinayaditya	Sony TV
	Ghar Sansaar	Rakeshnath Inamdar	

- Kanoon (1993) – Judge
- Zee Horror Show (1995) – Dhundh
- Shaktimaan (1997) – Tamraj Kilvish
- Amanat (1997)
- C.I.D. (2005) – D.C.P. (episodes 366, 367, 369, 378, 380, 388 and 390)
- Vishnu Puran (2000) – Shukracharaya
- Ramayan (2002) – Ravana
- Aakhir Kaun
- Shagun (2001–2004) Kailashnath
- Vishnupuran (2003) – Guru Shukracharya
- Urmila (2003)
- Kunti (2003)
- Dharti Ka Veer Yodha Prithviraj Chauhan (2006)
- Kumkum – Chandumal Mishra
- Left Right Left (2006) – Virendra Rai Chauhan
- Woh Rehne Waali Mehlon Ki – Guruji
- Maryada (2007) – Rajvir Singh
- Chotti Bahu (TV series) – Mr. Purohit
- Neeli Aankhen (2008)
- Sujata (2008) – M.D. Shah
- Waqt Batayega Kaun Apna Kaun Paraya – Sarvadaman Raichawdhury
- Santaan
- Babul Ka Aangann Chootey Na
- Love u Zindagi
- Ma Shakti – Rakthabija, and Rambha (Mahishasur's father)
- Devon Ke Dev...Mahadev (2011) – Daksha
- Diya Aur Baati Hum (Star Plus)
- Desh Ki Beti Nandini – Inderraj Raghuvanshi
- Maharana Pratap – Rao Maldeo Rathore
- Pradhanmantri (2013–14) B. R. Ambedkar
- Siya Ke Ram (2016) Vishrava, father of Ravan
- Prithvi Vallabh − Itihaas Bhi, Rahasya Bhi – Guru Vinayaditya
- Ghar Sansaar as Rakeshnath Inamdar
