= Policewala Gunda =

- Directed by: Pappu Verma
- Produced by: Anil Sharma; Sanjay Sharma
- Starring: Dharmendra; Reena Roy
- Music by: Bappi Lahiri
- Production company: Shantketan Films
- Release date: 19 May 1995
- Running time: 135 mins
- Country: India
- Language: Hindi

Policewala Gunda is a 1995 Indian Hindi-language crime film, which stars Dharmendra, Reena Roy in lead roles.

== Plot ==
This film revolves around a policeman, who is a kind and honorable person. After arresting the henchmen of a notorious crime leader, Kaalishankar Peeli Topiwaley, the crime lord sets out to kill the policeman with the minister. His wife becomes depressed. She is helped by a policeman Ajit Singh, who, after listening to the full story, vows to take revenge on Kaalishankar Peeli Topiwaley, Lala, Don and the minister.

== Cast ==
- Dharmendra as ACP Ajit Singh
- Reena Roy as Sudha Singh
- Sudesh Berry as Vikram Singh
- Jay Mehta as Jai Singh
- Mamta Kulkarni as Renu
- Shikha Swaroop as Mona Singh
- Mukesh Khanna as Inspector Ranveer Chauhan
- Deepti Naval as Mrs. Chauhan
- Jagdeep as Mamu
- Mohan Joshi as Chief Minister Shambhunath
- Sharat Saxena as Police Commissioner Suraj Singh
- Viju Khote as Jailor Shamsher Singh Kallu
- Pradeep Rawat as Jailor Patania
- Ajit Vachani as Constable / Inspector Nihal Singh
- Brahmachari as Police Constable R.K.Kadam
- Naresh Suri as Police Inspector Mahendra Singh
- Ram Sethi as Damodar
- Ishrat Ali as Narayandas
- Girija Shankar as Don Kailashnath Narang
- Ranjeet as Kalishankar Peeli Topiwaley
- Arun Bali as Central Government Minister Vishal Chaudhry
- Achyut Potdar as Mehra, Intelligent chief
- Seema Deo as Suman, mother of Ajit Singh

== Soundtrack ==
Music: Bappi Lahiri, Lyrics: Maya Govind.

=== Track list ===
Song	Singer
"Duniya Ke Mele" - 1	Vinod Rathod
"Duniya Ke Mele" - 2	Vinod Rathod
"Aate Baate Dahi Chatake Bad Phule Mangale, Chak Dhum Chak Dhum Gaate Gaate Aaja Mauj Manale"	Mohammed Aziz, Kumar Sanu, Arun Bakshi
"Dil Humse Poochhta Hai Kayi Baar Ae Sanam"	Lata Mangeshkar, Kumar Sanu
"Maine Dekha Ek Sapna, Mere Dil Mein Koi Aaya"	Lata Mangeshkar, Kumar Sanu
"Kangana Khanak Khanak"	Asha Bhosle
