= Manjeet Kullar =

Indian actress

Manjeet Kular
- Born: 28 June 1969 (age 55)
- Occupation: Actress
- Years active: 1985 – 2007
- Spouse: Sunil K. Mehan 1997-2021

Manjeet Kullar (also known as Manjeet Kular) is an Indian film and television actress. She is famous for her role of Devi Sati in Om Namah Shivay 1997 & for the role of nikki In Dhadkan movie 2000.

== Career ==
Manjeet Kular acted very well in Om Namah Shivay as Devi Sati. Kular acted in many Hindi films including notable films like Tehkhaana, Dil Ka Kya Kasoor, Dhadkan, Ikke Pe Ikka, Mohabbat Ke Dushman, Mr. Bond, Paandav, Sahiban and Yalgaar. She did many Punjabi films in the 1990s, including Mirza Sahiban, Vairee, Mirza Jatt, Deson Pardeson, Jaildaar, Main Maa Punjab Dee, Pachtawa, and Ishq Nachavye Gali Gali. She also worked on some TV serials. She was last seen in 2006's hit Mehndi Wale Hath, where she played the role of the evil mother in law. She is currently doing two Punjabi films. One film is being directed by Sham Ralhan and the other by National Award-winning Director Balwant Dullat.

== Filmography ==
Year	Title	Role	Language	Notes
1985	Misaal	Jelpa	Hindi	Credited as Manjeet Kaur
1987	Ahsaan		Hindi	
1987	Ahmad Suhrab Ahmadzai		Hindi	
1988	Mohabbat Ke Dushman		Hindi	
1990	Lootera Sultan		Hindi	
1990	Bandh Darwaza	Sapna	Hindi	
1991	Jatt Jeona Mour	Channi	Punjabi	
1991	Ajooba Kudrat Ka		Hindi	
1992	Vairi	Raano	Punjabi	
1992	Mirza Jatt	Sahiban	Punjabi	
1992	Dil Ka Kya Kasoor	Anu	Hindi	
1992	Mr. Bond	Reshma	Hindi	
1992	Yalgaar	Lily	Hindi	
1993	Jid Jattan Di	Kamaljeet Kaur 'Guddi'	Punjabi	
1993	Sahibaan		Hindi	
1993	Ankhila Soorma	Preeto	Punjabi	
1994	Kachehri		Punjabi	
1994	Ikke Pe Ikka	Kanchan	Hindi	
1995	Bagawat	Channi	Punjabi	
1995	Paandav	Mrs. Jyoti Kumar	Hindi	
1995	Zaildaar	Billo	Punjabi	
1995	Muqaddar		Punjabi	
1995	Dhee Jatt Di	Special appearance in Song- Sassi	Punjabi	
1996	Ishq Nachavye Gali Gali	Raano	Punjabi	
1996	Deson Pardes		Punjabi	
1996	Pachhtawa		Punjabi	
1996	Maahir	Chaand	Hindi	
1997	Truck Driver	Special appearance in Dance number	Punjabi	
1998	Main Maa Punjab Dee	Naseeb Kaur 'Naseebo'	Punjabi	Movie won National award
2000	Dalaal No.1	Monica	Hindi	
2000	Dhadkan	Nikki	Hindi	
2000	Mohabbatein		Hindi	
2006	Mehndi Wale Hath	Jageer Kaur	Punjabi	
2007	Vidroh	Raano	Punjabi	

== Television ==
Year	Title	Role	Notes
1991	Kujh Khatta Kujh Mittha	Jugni	Song picturisation
1996	Dastaan-e-Hatimtai	Fairy Queen	Antagonist
1996	Zimbo		Supporting role
1997	Om Namah Shivay	Goddess Sati	Lead Role
1997	Shaktimaan	Kaushalya/Maharani Shavalika	Supporting role
1998	X Zone	Kapalika	Episode-93
2000	Mehndi Tere Naam Ki	Meeta Raheja	Antagonist
2002	Aryamaan - Brahmaand Ka Yodha	Queen Nasa	Antagonist
2006	Mehndi Wale Haath		Negative role
