= Raman Khatri =

Indian actor and producer

- Born: Raman Vedprakash Khatri; 3 January 1947; Pune, Maharashtra,India
- Other name: Sahab
- Occupations: Film and TV actor
- Years active: 1990s–present
- Television: Shaktimaan Shri Krishna Om Namah Shivay Ramayan

Raman Khatri is an Indian film and television serial actor and producer. He is known from Doordarshan TV serial Shri Krishna in which he played Yudhishthira, and Ramayan in which he played Valmiki.

== Early life ==
Raman Khatri was born into a Hindu-Khatri family in Pune to Vedprakash Khatri and Amrita Khatri. Father had a distinguished career in the military, While his Mother was a Visharad in music and also Music teacher by prfoession; while his brother was actively involved in theatre. It was on the sets of a film that Raman Khatri had a chance encounter with the renowned actor Govinda, who was impressed by him and subsequently offered him a role in a movie.

== Film and television ==
=== Films ===
Khatri has appeared in the following films and television sitcoms:

- Do Ankhe Baarah Hath (1997)
- Shaktimaan (1997)
- Kudrat (1998)
- Abhishek De (2011)
- Qaidi Band – Mantri (2017)

=== Television ===
Year	Serials	Acting	Ref.
1995–1997	Shri Krishna (1993 TV series)	Dharmarajā	
1997	Shaktimaan	Kumar Ranjan or Saheb	
1997	Jai Hanuman	Parsuram/Indrajit	
1997	Jai Ganga Maiyaa	Lord Bhole	
1998	Abhay	Kapil Kumaar	
1998–2000	Om Namah Shivaya	Hiranyakashipu/Bhasmasura/Vibhishan	
1999	Aurat	Inspector Vikram	
2000	Japa,Tapa and Vrata	Indra	
2000	Jai Santoshi Maa	Naarad	
2000	Sri Ganesh	Bhayasurā/Dayasurā	
2001	Brahma Vishnu Mahesh	Mahesh	
2002	Ret ka Dariya		
2007	Ganesh Leela	Kashinaresh	
2008	Ramayan	Kuber Dev/Valmiki	
2011	Shama	Asagar	
2011	Devon Ke Dev...Mahadev	Rishi Arthram	
2012	Savdhan India	Appearance (Episode 985)	
2012	Har Yug mein Aayega Arjun	Dinesh Chopra	
2013	Fear Files	Episode character	
2013	CID (Indian TV series)	Guddu (episode 931 और 932)	
2013	Aadalat	Episode character	
2014	Dard Ka Rishta	Kedarnath Sharma	
2024	Mangal Lakshmi	Mr. Tandon	
