= Shaktiman (1993 film) =

1993 Indian film by K. C. Bokadia

- Release poster
- Directed by: K.C. Bokadia
- Written by: K.C. Bokadia
- Produced by: Suresh Bokadia
- Starring: Ajay Devgn; Karisma Kapoor; Mukesh Khanna; Kulbhushan Kharbanda
- Music by: Channi Singh
- Distributed by: B.M.B Combines
- Release date: 9 July 1993
- Running time: 155 minutes
- Country: India
- Language: Hindi

Shaktiman (transl. The Powerful Man) is a 1993 Indian Hindi-language action film directed by K.C. Bokadia and starring Ajay Devgn, Karisma Kapoor, Mukesh Khanna, Kulbhushan Kharbanda. Other cast members include Gulshan Grover, Ajit Khan, Parikshat Sahni and Mahavir Shah.

== Plot ==
Businessman Rai Bahadur Laxminarayan lives a wealthy lifestyle in Mumbai with his wife, Laxmi. Although they have been married for several years, they have no children. While on a trip to Shimla, they adopt their servant, Diler's son, rename him Vicky, and bring him back home, much to the dismay of Diler's wife, Parvati. Sometime later, Laxmi gets pregnant and revisits Shimla where she meets with an accident and passes away, leaving behind a newborn son, Amar. Diler wants to kill Amar, but Parvati wants to return him to Laxminarayan and runs away to Mumbai. Diler informs his employer that both his wife and son have died and have been cremated. Diler relocates to Bombay and follows her but is unable to locate Parvati. She does reach Mumbai along with Amar but is unable to find Laxminarayan. Years later Amar has grown up, lives with Parvati in Versova, works as a Police Inspector at Sion Police Station, and is in love with Priya, the Superintendent of Police's daughter, while Diler is a taxi driver, and Vicky is an alcoholic and wants to marry Priya. Their lives will soon interline and become complicated with blackmail, deceit, and murder.

== Cast ==
- Ajay Devgan as Amar Chauhan
- Karishma Kapoor as Priya Vashisht
- Kulbhushan Kharbanda as Rai Bahadur Laxminarayan
- Mukesh Khanna as Diler
- Parikshit Sahni as Police Superintendent
- Gulshan Grover as Vicky Bose
- Ajit as Shamsher Singh / Tiger
- Mahavir Shah as Chhote Arvind Singh
- Tiku Talsania as Dimagchand
- Anjana Mumtaz as Parvati
- Beena Banerjee as Laxmi

== Soundtrack ==
Sameer wrote all songs.

Song	Singer
"Kaise Teri Main"	Aparna Mayekar
"Mere Haath Ki Chudi"	Asha Bhosle, Udit Narayan
"Yeh Kaisa Mausam"	Amit Kumar
"Haule Haule"	Asha Bhosle
"Jee Na Lage"	Udit Narayan, Sadhana Sargam
"Sun Goriye"	Asha Bhosle, Channi Singh
