= Shikha Swaroop =

Indian actress

- Born: 23 October 1970 (age 55); New Delhi, India
- Occupation: Actress
- Beauty pageant titleholder
- Title: Miss India 1988
- Major competitions: Miss Navi Queen 1987 (Winner); Eve's Weekly Miss Delhi 1988 (Winner); Eve's Weekly Miss India 1988 (Winner); Miss International 1988 (Unplaced)

Shikha Swaroop (born 23 October 1970) is an Indian actress, model and beauty pageant titleholder who won the title of Miss India International 1988.

== Career ==
While still in college, she became Miss India International in 1988 with Shabnam Patel and continued to wear this crown until 1991 when she relinquished it to Preeti Mankotia.

No beauty contests were held during 1989 and 1990 due to the demise of the sponsor, Eve's Weekly. The contests resumed after a new sponsor, Femina, took over in 1991. Apart from being crowned Miss India 1988, she won a gold medal in the All India Pistol Shooting Championship in 1988. In addition to modelling and being the brand ambassador for many products, she was a fashion model for over 400 shows in India and abroad. She also played badminton on a national level. At 5 feet 11 inches tall, she was the tallest actress at the time. Her career catapulted, but she suffered major setbacks when she became seriously ill.

She appeared in several 1990s Hindi films, and on television in Chandrakanta, which was a huge hit. In the 1980s and early 1990s, Shikha was considered one of the most desirable women in India. She appeared as a lead in 11 movies, some of which were multi-starrers: Anil Sharma's Tahalka, Policewala Gunda, Pranlal Mehta's Police Public, Gulshan Kumar's Naag Mani, Kayda Kanoon, Pyar Hua Chori Chori, Cheetah, Thanedarni, and Awaaz De Kahan Hai.

Her other popular TV shows are Himesh Reshammiya's Andaaz, Amarprem, Anupama, Sunil Agnihotri's Yug, and Siddhant Vision's Kahan Se Kahan Tak. She made a comeback with the TV serial Kahani Chandrakanta Ki. She also played the role of Kaikeyi in the Zee TV show Ramayan.

== Personal life ==
She is the only child of her parents and leads a content life. She remains unmarried.

== Filmography ==
Year	Film	Role	Notes
1990	Awaaz De Kahan Hai.		
1990	Police Public	Usha Swaroop	
1991	Pyar Hua Chori Chori	Vaishali Verma	
1991	Naag Mani		
1992	Tahalka	Intelligence Chief Cynthia	
1993	Kayda Kanoon	Kavita Sinha	
1994	Thanedarni		
1995	Policewala Gunda	Mona Singh	
1994	Cheetah	Rajni Kamalnath	

== Television ==
Year	Series	Role	Notes
1994	Chandrakanta	Princess Chandrakanta	
1996	Yug	Professor Anja	
1997	Shaktimaan	The Villain Alien	
2011	Kahani Chandrakanta Ki	Maharani Chandrakanta	
2012	Ramayan	Kaikeyi	

Preceded by (India) Erica Maria De Sousa	Eve's Weekly Miss India; 1988	Succeeded by (India) Preeti Mankotia
