= Shaktimaan =

Indian television series (1997–2005)

- Genre: Action; Superhero
- Created by: Mukesh Khanna
- Written by: Ghalib Asad Bhopali; Brijmohan Pandey
- Directed by: Dinker Jani
- Starring: Mukesh Khanna; Vaishnavi Mahant; Kitu Gidwani; Surendra Pal; Lalit Parimoo; Tom Alter
- Opening theme: "Shaktiman"
- Country of origin: India
- Original language: Hindi
- No. of seasons: 1
- No. of episodes: 450

Production
- Producer: Mukesh Khanna
- Production location: Mumbai
- Cinematography: Manoj Soni
- Editor: Nasir Hakim Ansari
- Running time: 45-60 minutes
- Production company: Bheeshm International

Original release
- Network: DD National
- Release: 13 September 1997 – 27 March 2005

Shaktimaan is an Indian Hindi-language superhero television series created and produced by Mukesh Khanna. Inspired by American superhero Superman, the series aired on DD National from 13 September 1997 to 27 March 2005. Khanna starred as the titular superhero, who gains superhuman abilities through meditation and the five elements of nature, and his alter ego, Pandit Gangadhar Vidhyadhar Mayadhar Omkarnath Shastri, a photographer for Aaj Ki Aawaz. The series also featured Vaishnavi Mahant (initially played by Kitu Gidwani) as journalist Geeta Vishwas and Surendra Pal as the primary antagonist, Tamraj Kilvish.

The series was widely popular and received recognition for its impact on children, with Khanna being acknowledged by Indian political leaders for his portrayal. The show was followed by Shaktimaan: The Animated Series in 2011 and a television film, Hamara Hero Shaktimaan, in 2013. In 2024, Khanna announced the revival of Shaktimaan through a teaser video.

In 2025, Shaktimaan made a comeback as an audio series titled Shaktimaan Returns on the audio entertainment platform Pocket FM. According to media reports, the adaptation comprises a 40-episode new storyline that expands the original universe of the superhero. The narrative takes Shaktimaan's mission beyond fighting traditional evil, focusing instead on humanity's greed and the reckless exploitation of nature. The series introduces a new antagonist, Mahatatva, a former guardian of balance who becomes corrupted and seeks to restore harmony to Earth—even if it means resorting to destruction.

== Plot ==
Humanity existed in peace until the onset of the Kali Yuga, which brought greed and hatred, leading to its decline over 6,000 years. To restore balance, a mystical sect of saints known as the Suryanshis chose a man to rise against evil and protect society. He was trained in Kundalini Yoga to awaken his seven chakras, granting him mystical and supernatural abilities. As part of his training, he underwent the ritual of death, immersing his body in holy fire to attain complete control over his powers. When the five natural elements—fire, earth, water, wind, and sky—infused his being, he transformed into a superhuman. With his newfound powers, he vowed to eradicate corruption and injustice. Recognising his heroic deeds, journalist Geeta Vishwas named him Shaktimaan.

It is later revealed that Shaktimaan is the reincarnation of Shri Satya, a member of the Suryanshi Sect from the Mahabharata era 5,000 years ago. To maintain his secret identity, he assumes the persona of Pandit Gangadhar Vidyadhar Mayadhar Omkarnath Shastri, a comical and eccentric photographer who speaks in formal Hindi.

Shaktimaan's greatest adversary is Tamraj Kilvish, the embodiment of darkness and evil, who seeks to spread corruption and chaos.

== Cast ==
- Mukesh Khanna as Pandit Gangadhar Vidyadhar Mayadhar Omkarnath Shastri / Shaktimaan, Major Ranjeet Singh, Shri Satya, Evil Clone Shaktimaan
- Kitu Gidwani as Gita Viswas (1997)
  - Vaishnavi as Gita Viswas (1997–2005), Vaishnavi replaced Gidwani as Viswas
- Surendra Pal as Tamraj Kilvish / Guru Sarvagya
- Lalit Parimoo as Dr. Jaikaal (Jackal)
  - Arun Bakshi as Dr. Jaikaal (in last few episodes)
  - Amit Mishra as Dr. Jaikaal (in last few episodes)
- Tom Alter as 1st Mahaguru
- Arun Mathur as 2nd Mahaguru
- Salil Sudhakar as 3rd Mahaguru
- Gajendra Chauhan as 4th Mahaguru / Shuv
- Mohsin Memon as Appu (in first few episodes) and then replaced by Master Vinnie pachauri.
- Raju Shrivastav as Durandhar Singh, the 2nd editor of Aaj Ki Awaaz
- Manjeet Kullar as Kaushalya, Shaktimaan's biological mother/ Maharani Shavalika
- Karminder Kaur/Ashwini Kalsekar as Shalaaka / Kaali Billi
- Dolly Minhas as Shaliyaa / Safed Billi, elder sister, and guardian of Shalaaka
- Shweta Kawatra as Kalushah Karadunga Ruler
- Shweta Shinde as Matandikaa Daak Bunglow Witch
- Sharmila Shetty as 2nd Villain Alien with Shikha Swaroop, Behroopia in starting Episodes Later Replaced By Annu Kashyap, Sheena Alien
- Sunila Karambelkar as Queen Mayaadri and Natasha in starting episodes
- Annu Kashyap as Teemira / Behroopia
- Kishore Bhanushali as Naurangee the thief
- Rajendra Gupta as Prof. Gyanesh Viswas, paranormal scientist, Gita Viswas's father
- Nawab Shah as Mayor JJ "Jai Kumar Janardhan" / Kakodar
- Deepak Bhatia as Mathur / Girgit
- Mohan Gokhale as The Invisible Man
- Alka Amin as Dr. Nadia Jackal Assistant in last episodes
- Sharad Smart as Satyaprakash Nirala, the 1st editor of Aaj Ki Awaaz
- Ram Sethi as Harishchand Satyavadi, the editor of Dainik Dhamaka
- Dilip Darbar as Inspector Salim Qazi
- Jitu Mehta as Constable Bhinde
- Arvind Vekaria as Manager of Rajputana Dharamshala
- Allauddin Khan as Tony Bhai
- Deepshikha Nagpal as Paroma and Sheraali (dual roles)
- Arun Bali as Dayal Chopra, Businessman, and owner of Aaj Ki Awaz
- Zahida Parveen as Nisha Saluja, a reporter who replaced Geeta at Aaj Ki Awaaz
- Shikha Swaroop as Alien (special appearance) / Jal rani
- Goga Kapoor as Vilas Rao
- Deepraj Rana as Inspector Jai Singh, a Corrupt Police officer
- Urvashi Dholakia as Maansi Sharma
- Neelam Mehra as Maansi
- Faqir Nabi as Kapala/ Dr. Sahab
- Raman Khatri as Sahab / Kumar Ranjan
- Jay Mishra as Ghosh Babu
- Brijmohan Pandey as Toyman/Raja/Raj
- Sanjeev Chaddha as Shudhanshu Ji
- Ajit Mehra as Swami Ji
- Govind Khatri as Mahashay
- Shubhangi Latkar as Arundhati Devi
- Hemal Dharia as Hemal
- Urmila Amar as Leela Lautekar
- Nupur Alankar as Kamini, film gossip writer at Aaj Ki Awaaz
- Raj Premi as Johaharu
- Swati Anand as Sunanda Superwoman & Copycat of Shaktimaan
- Durgesh Nandini as Rachna (Punjabi Bahu)
- Shravani Goswami as Shalini (Bengali Bahu)
- Manav Sohal as Shalini's husband
- Preeti Puri as Inspector Amrita Arora

== Production ==
=== Development ===
I would watch my nephew sitting glued to the TV whenever Power Zone came on, shooting with imaginary fire guns, or operating some imaginary hi-fi gadget in his own little world. That's when it struck me that if I made Shaktimaan I would have a readymade audience of kids who are always most impressed with SFX tricks.

— Mukesh Khanna.

Mukesh Khanna conceived Shaktimaan in 1981 while working on a film with Rajshri Productions. He shared the idea with producer Rajkumar Barjatya, and they planned to develop it as a film titled Aakash, but the project did not progress. Khanna later revived the concept under his own production banner, Bheeshm International, named after his acclaimed role as Bheeshma in Mahabharat (1988–1990).

In a 1997 interview with Screen, Khanna explained that the growing popularity of superhero content among children influenced his decision to create Shaktimaan. Observing his nephew's fascination with animated superhero shows, he saw an opportunity to introduce an Indian superhero. He noted that while Indian mythology featured powerful figures, it lacked a dedicated superhero like Superman or Spider-Man. This led him to create Shaktimaan, a character born from a yagna and the combined energies of the universe.

For Shaktimaan's alter ego, 'Pandit Gangadhar Vidhyadhar Mayadhar Omkarnath Shastri', Khanna wanted a distinct, comical persona to contrast with the superhero's powerful presence. The character's appearance, including buck teeth and floppy hair, was inspired by American comedian Jerry Lewis.

The series was sponsored by Parle-G from its debut episode. In 2004, sign language interpretation was introduced for the social messages delivered at the end of episodes to make them accessible to a wider audience.

=== Special effects ===
Mukesh Khanna aimed for Shaktimaan to feature the "best-ever" special effects on Indian television. However, after the series aired, he admitted that it fell short of his expectations. He had envisioned effects comparable to those in Superman,Independence Day (1996 film),Armageddon (1998 film),volcano (1997 film),2012 (film),Independence Day: Resurgence,Rambo: First Blood Part 2 Spider-Man1,2,3 and Terminator, but acknowledged that the availability of advanced computer graphics and trained professionals in India was limited at the time. The special effects for each episode cost ₹2 lakh, with a total expenditure of ₹10 lakh in 1997.

== Release ==
=== Broadcast ===
Shaktimaan aired for 450 episodes on Doordarshan National from 13 September 1997 to 27 March 2005. The series was later dubbed and broadcast in multiple Indian languages, including Tamil on Doordarshan Tamil (then DD Podhigai) and Chutti TV, and in Odia on Tarang. Reruns aired on STAR Utsav and Dangal TV, while a re-edited version premiered on Pogo TV in 2006, including an English-dubbed version for the network.

In 2019, Mukesh Khanna stated on his YouTube channel, Bheeshm International, that the series was canceled due to high broadcasting costs, which resulted in financial losses. He clarified that the decision was not influenced by concerns over children imitating stunts from the show, as was widely speculated.

In response to the COVID-19 pandemic, Shaktimaan was re-telecast on DD National from 1 April 2020 after the suspension of ongoing productions. It was also aired on DD Retro starting 13 April 2020.

=== Home media and streaming services ===
The series was released on DVD by Ultra India. The series was also launched on their YouTube channel on 17 February 2011. A Bhojpuri version was also launched on Ultra Kids Zone's YouTube channel in 2014.

The series was made available to stream on Amazon Prime Video in 2019.

== Fictional biography ==
Shaktimaan
- Shaktimaan character
- First appearance: Episode 1
- Last appearance: Shalu Dupes Sethji
- Created by: Mukesh Khanna
- Portrayed by: Mukesh Khanna

In-universe information
- Full name: Gangadhar Shastri
- Alias: Pandit Gangadhar Vidyadhar Mayadhar Omkarnath Shastri
- Species: Human (Yogi)
- Occupation: Photographer for 'Aaj Ki Awaaz' Newspaper; Hindi Professor at Tarun College; Reporter at KR TV
- Affiliation: Suryanshi
- Family: Ranjit Singh (biological father); Kaushalya Singh (biological mother); Vidyadhar Shastri (foster father); Arundhati Devi (foster mother); Mayadhar Shastri (foster grandfather); Omkarnath Shastri (foster great grandfather)
- Religion: Hindu
- Origin: Himalayas
- Nationality: Indian
- Position: Protector of Earth from evil

=== Origin ===
Shaktimaan received powers from seven gurus who trained and blessed him with "yogic shakti which was natural power." He was the chosen warrior against evil by Siddha gurus of a cult named Suryanshi. They are followers of the star Sun. As part of the training, he trained with Kundalini Yoga to awake the 7 chakras of the body and gain 'supernatural' powers from them. To gain complete control over his powers, he performed the ritual of death. However, this did not cause death but made him more alive than when he was a normal man. He also performed Yajna in which he entered the fire himself and dissolved his body in the fire. Then, the five elements of life, i.e. fire, wind, water, earth, sky revived his body giving him special powers from them. Thus, after leaving his mortal body, he was given a superhuman form to fight against the evil in the world as Shaktimaan.

After Shaktimaan was created, he set out to destroy his archenemy Kilvish. But, as the Mahaguru (Tom Alter) explained, Kilvish can only be defeated after evil is destroyed. Shaktimaan's mission is to destroy the sin within people, not the sinned people. Shaktimaan's adventures show him pursuing justice and saving his friends while Kilvish and his minions plot to defeat him.

=== Powers ===
Shaktimaan has superhuman powers that lie inside his body in his seven chakras of Kundalini attained through meditation. Shaktimaan worships God through the symbol Om. Truthfulness is his motto. He can even separate his body into five different bodies of fire, wind, water, earth, and sky. He is an expert, skilled and intelligent fighter and has fought with super-skilled enemies. He possesses physical powers like unlimited speed (up to the speed of light), strength, durability as well as psychic powers like telepathy, teleportation, telekinesis, etc. Although he possesses godlike powers, his only weakness is a crystal (Papmani) possessed by Tamraj Kilvish which can be used to defeat and even kill him. This makes him powerless because it is filled with the evil of the world and is the source of the black powers. But he regains his strength after the crystal is taken away from him. He can be killed if the crystal is placed in front of him and he is treated violently to the verge of death. Shaktimaan also gets brief premonitions about the incidents that are going to happen to him in the future. This can be observed in Kashtak's episode, Geeta going to jail, and in Kapala's reappearance episodes.

Shaktimaan's powers are virtually limitless. He can do practically anything he imagines. The only limit to his powers is his own belief in himself and his knowledge of how to manifest his powers. His powers come from his chakras. (Note: Although we'll call them chakras in the Vedas, in the series dialogue they will also be called energy centers.)

The seven chakras in his body which give him powers are:

- Energy Chakra (1): This chakra gives Shaktimaan super strength, enabling him to fly, shoot fire from his hands, emit rays from his fingertips, blow a stream of freezing air, or send out protective force fields which nothing can penetrate (provided he can maintain his willpower and not give in). Shaktimaan's strength allows him to physically penetrate anything and lift any object.
- Creative Chakra (2): This chakra gives Shaktimaan the power to manifest things out of thin air.
- Astral Chakra (3): This chakra gives Shaktimaan the power to control his astral body (a semi-transparent, ethereal duplicate of himself) which can fly, walk through walls, see inside objects, etc.
- Heart Chakra (4): This chakra gives Shaktimaan the power to control the will of others, but only for good. He can will people to do the right thing, see the error in their ways. This power is most useful when Shaktimaan needs to stop someone who is under the control of Kilvish from doing evil.
- Vibration Chakra (5): This chakra gives Shaktimaan the power to control all types of vibrations, including sound waves, light waves, healing warmth, etc. He can also use it to hear ultrasonic sounds and can speed up the vibrations of his own atoms, allowing him to transport himself in space or time. This can be very useful for getting out of dangerous situations.
- Psychic Chakra (6): This chakra gives Shaktimaan the power of the "third eye", which enables him to read minds and see anywhere in the world at any distance. He can sense impending danger and see things at any corner of the world.

=== Personal life ===
To avoid being an easy prey of Tamraj Kilvish, Shaktimaan adopted an alter ego of Pandit Gangadhar Vidyadhar Mayadhar Omkarnath Shastri in the society. The character Gangadhar is completely opposite to that of Shaktimaan in all aspects, e.g. appearance, intelligence while he speaks pure Hindi. Whenever he gets an important job to do, he says that he has written a book on it which had never been published. Staying in society as a common person helped him to get knowledge about the crime. He got a job as a photographer for the newspaper Aaj Ki Awaaz after being interviewed by Geeta Vishwas. After a few weeks, he became a co-reporter working with Geeta. Through a series of incidents and the fact that he could never capture a photo of Shaktimaan, Geeta came to know about the dual identity of Shaktimaan, which was previously known only to Suryanshis. After Aaj Ki Awaaz was shut down, Gangadhar became a Hindi professor at a Tarun college. Later, he left the college to work for a news channel KR TV with Geeta.

== Characters ==
=== Main characters ===
==== Shaktimaan / Gangadhar Vidhyadhar Mayadhar Omkarnath Shasthri ====
Actor Mukesh Khanna portrays the main character of the show Shaktimaan and his alter ego Gangadhar. In the show, Shaktimaan was depicted as a character who had attained superhuman powers through meditation and five elements of nature. He is trained by a mystical sect of saints to fight against all odds and defeat the evil prevailing within the society.

Shaktimaan's alter ego is Gangadhar, who is a funny geek. He works as a photographer in a daily newspaper office to maintain his secret identity. He is portrayed as the complete opposite of Shaktimaan.

==== Gita Vishwas ====
Gita Vishwas (Vaishnavi Mahant, previously Kitu Gidwani), the female lead in the serial, used to work as a brave news reporter in Aaj Ki Awaaz. She was the first to report about Shaktimaan in a newspaper and named the superhero Shaktimaan. Incidentally, she was the only reporter to get interviews with Shaktimaan as Gangadhar used to accompany her as a photographer on missions. She died in a crash planned by Dr. Jackal. As Shaktimaan loved her, he brought her back to life again using his power, which resulted in losing his powers temporarily due to his against the nature actions. Gita came to know about this after Shaktimaan regained power with the vow that he will never repeat the same mistake again. To ensure this, she planned to leave the country. In the lead up to that situation, she got to know about Shaktimaan's dual character for the third time. But unlike the first two occasions, Shaktimaan didn't erase it from Gita's memory this time as she promised to keep it secret forever.

One year later^{‡}, after Aaj Ki Awaaz was shut down, its staff members persuaded Gita in returning to India to join them to release Shaktimaan comics. Later, she teamed up with Gangadhar again and joined KR TV as a television reporter while working for the comics simultaneously.

^{‡} – When the journalist character Gita Vishwas was written out of the series, fan protests prompted the producers to bring her back.

==== Gyanesh Vishwas ====
He is a scientist who was Gita's father and Ranjit Singh's friend. He encountered Ranjit Singh while on an expedition to perform research at a mysterious valley, where he and his team were attacked by invisible figures (later revealed to be Tamraj Kilvish's servants) that shot fires at them and was rescued by Ranjit Singh. When he went to the city and returned to meet Ranjit Singh at the forest later, he found out that Ranjit Singh and the whole group of soldiers there had been killed. He writes the incidents in his diary. Many years later, Shaktimaan wanted to know more about Ranjit Singh from Gyanesh, as he didn't know Ranjit Singh was actually Shaktimaan's father and he was only raised by Pandit Vidyadhar Shastri. However, Gyanesh is killed by Dr. Jackal before it happens. Later, Gita gives Gangadhar Gyanesh's diary which helps him find out the truth.

=== Enemies ===
==== Girgit ====
the girgit known as (chameleon) the girgit along with his kakodhar it was a half man half animal the girgit attack's Shaktimaan with uses his long tongue As if a strong rope then shaktimaan attacks and defeated the girgit then Shaktimaan tied him up the girgit with this tongue and threw him into the Orbit or Space

==== Tamraj Kilvish ====
Tamraj Kilvish is Shaktimaan's archenemy and overall the main antagonist of the entire franchise. Tamraj means King of Darkness (Tama = darkness, raj = king) and Kilvish means shameful. He has lived 6000 years and is the source of evil in the world. He intends to rule the world by spreading darkness, hatred, sin, and evil. It is said that the source of his strength is one-half of the "Shakti Punj" (the half which is referred to as "Shaktiman") which he managed to retain after he originally obtained the entire Shakti Punj by deceit from Shri Satya (Satya means truth), the founder of the Suryavanshi. However, it is also mentioned that the source of his strength is the evil that is committed by people in this world.

It was later revealed that only Shri Satya can kill Tamraj Kilvish. After a death-defying adventure, Shaktimaan was told that he is the rebirth of Shri Satya. Shri Satya had given the exact time of the child's birth and the place before he died about 6000 years ago. Tamraj also knows this and this is the main reason he is frightened by the appearance of Shaktimaan as he knows that only Shaktimaan can kill Tamraj. He murdered Shaktimaan's parents and his adoptive father, Pandit Vidyadhar Shastri. He and his minion's plot to kill him but always fail. His minions include Electric-man (who can shoot lightning bolts from his body), Stone-man (who can shoot stones from his body), Plastica (who can stretch any part of her body), Dr. Jackal (an evil scientist), and others. Dr. Jackal has helped Kilvish in his various schemes by cloning Shaktimaan and also by turning aliens against him.

In the television series, Kilvish is often treated as the personification of darkness itself even though he was once a human being who later becomes very powerful and commits many evil deeds. In an attempt to become immortal, he left his mortal body and took an ethereal body that can't be killed but Shaktimaan is told that he has to kill all the evil in the world to destroy Tamraj's ethereal body. Kilvish's trademark quote is "Andhera Kaayam Rahe" (May Darkness Prevail), which is also used by his followers.

Kilvish's character evolves as the series progresses. In the beginning episodes of Shaktimaan, his face is never shown and his voice is different from the voice that he uses in the later episodes of Shaktimaan, in which his role is played by Surendra Pal. Later his face deforms to become a distorted wolf-like face.

==== Dr. Jackal ====
Dr. "Jackal" Vishvamitra Shandilya is an evil scientist who works for Kilvish. His earlier intention was not that of becoming evil. However, when he was denied scholarship for research, Kilvish provided him with funds and labs; this made him a supporter of Kilvish and helped him become an evil scientist. Though he is overall a brilliant scientist, his specialisation is cloning and various energy rays. His creations against Shaktimaan include Kekda Man (a clone formed by fusing cells of crab and human), followed by Jonk Jonkaa (a clone using leech), an evil clone of Shaktimaan, Plastica, Lightman, 3D image, Super-heroine Sunanda and others. He also invented a height control solution and fictional EC- rays.

==== Sahab ====
Sahab is an organised criminal and drug lord. Like Shaktimaan he also possesses a double identity, the other being that of a law-abiding industrialist and Mayor, known as Kumar Ranjan. Except for Tamraj Kilvish (and later Dr. Jackal), no one knows that Sahab and Kumar Ranjan are the same people, thus making this his biggest strength. Through his criminal mind, Sahab keeps plotting ways to create trouble for Shaktimaan or to defame him and to find out about the real identity of Shaktimaan.

==== Other antagonists ====
Kakodar

Kakodar is a sorcerer with the visage of a devil who was imprisoned in a statue nearly five hundred years ago. He could only be freed if a good person removes a thread from his neck. It is unclear whether he was cursed by an enemy or punished by Tamraj to end up imprisoned. In the present day, the mayor of Mumbai, Jai Kumar Janardhan a.k.a. JJ (Nawab Shah) was deceived by his personal assistant Mathur (Deepak Bhatia) to break the thread and free him. Mayor JJ died in shock at seeing Kakodar's true form. As instructed by Mathur, Kakodar possessed JJ's body and decided to spread Andhera (darkness).

He was the primary supervillain in the first part of the series as he uses JJ's wealth and power to hatch plots to kill Shaktimaan but always failed. Unlike most of the other assailants of Shaktimaan, he is very sharp and analytical. He even tries to approach Tarendra, an all-knowing sentient being of light, to know the truth about Shaktimaan. He is cunning enough to be able to use mental manipulation to trick Shaktimaan on occasion. This put the hero into a dilemma, and self-doubt drained him of his powers temporarily.

The full extent of his powers is not revealed. On an occasion, JJ's girlfriend Zuby realises that JJ is possessed by a demon and tries to reveal him in public. He uses hypnosis to drive her mad so that the public will ignore her statements. He has a potent and fatal poison inside him that he can spit out of his mouth which affects everyone except Shaktimaan and the jj turns kakodhar the Shaktimaan and Kakodar end things and starts in a front fighting when Kakodar turns into his real form and Shaktimaan turns him back to a statue and shaktimaan throws the kakodhar the golden idol into the sea

Natasha

Natasha (Portrayed by Sunila Karambelkar) was also a demonic evil woman sent by Kilvish. Along with Mathur, she serves JJ/Kakodar. She was JJ's secretary before he was possessed. She has the ability to change her appearance. She kills a C.B.I. officer and takes her appearance to interrogate Gangadhar and Geeta on one occasion. Her powers were greatly diminished due to Shaktimaan defeating Kakodar. To regain the power she and Mathur decide to sacrifice Shaktimaan. For this they kidnap the son of a scientist to get the formula of invisible man which may help to defeat Shaktimaan.

Mathur

Mathur (Deepak Bhatia) was a girgit it is one of the two trusted demonic accomplices of JJ/Kakodar along with Natasha. He initially served JJ as his personal assistant (PA) before he was possessed, but was secretly preparing the stage for Kakodar's entry under Tamraj's directions. His true identity is revealed after Kakodar is released from his imprisonment. Not many of his powers are revealed in the series. He has the ability to change his appearance at will, but not shapeshift to assume someone else's body. He also loses his powers when Kakodar was defeated by Shaktimaan.

Electric-man

He was the first synthetic villain faced by Shaktimaan. Dr. Chandola, an evil scientist, created him. Dr. Chandola claims that the Electric man was his son, whom he killed so that he can resurrect the dead body with electricity. When he comes to life he kills Dr. Chandola. Without recognising a friend from a foe he kills everyone in his path and spreads destruction in the city. His powers include shooting electricity from eyes and electrocution on contact. Finding him difficult to restrain, Shaktimaan grabs him and tunnels deep into the earth, pushing him deep underground.

Kapala

Kapala is a corrupted Tantrik who serves Tamraj Kilvish. His primary skill is his shapeshifting to inanimate objects such as vehicles and weapons. He also has many other magical devices and servants under his control. One such device is a metal plate he wears around his neck that has the power to steal his opponent's strength. The villain Stone man was created from his magic skull. Shaktimaan destroys both the metal plate and the magic skull. He has an odd sense of humour as he makes jokes while fighting Shaktimaan. There are occasions where he serves as comic relief. This is in contrast to other villains who are stark and serious. He also has a very fragile ego and falls victim to taunts. His main accessory is a trident. Shaktimaan eventually turns him into stone and shatters him at one instance. However, in later episodes of Shaktimaan, he is shown resurrected back to life. He is played by Faqir Nabi.

Khali-Bali

Khali and Bali are two dwarvish green and red imps. Their names originate from the Urdu word Khalbali which means commotion. Throughout their appearances, they constantly argue and reconcile with each other over inane reasons. They claim to eat humans but there is no evidence regarding the same. They can combine to form a single full-size demon. This demon wears green and red garb. Their power is insignificant when they are separated but when they both combine they become as physically strong as a full-fledged demon. Not much is shown regarding any psychic powers they possess.

Kashtak

During an archaeological dig in the qila(fort) at Bhangdu Khati, the lead archaeologist Prof. Hussain and his assistant Hema discover a sarcophagus and a mysteriously untarnished sword made out of an unknown metal in the ruins. Hema accidentally opens the sarcophagus and unleashes Kashtak, a servant of Tamraj Kilvish. Kashtak used to terrorise the world and was imprisoned nearly 2500 years ago by the curse of Komalatha, a lady sage. Geeta Vishwas turns out to be the reincarnation of Komalatha. His sword Khadgi has many powers imbued in them such as telekinesis, petrification and resurrection and control of his army. In the series, it is enhanced with the power of mind control by Tamraj. When he controls the mind of a scientist to create a weapon of mass destruction, Shaktimaan stops him .

Kekda Man

Kekda man (Crab man) is one of the two dangerous clones of Dr. Jackal (along with Jonk Jonkaa). He is a clone created by Dr. Jackal by fusing cells of crab and a kidnapped Suryanshi. Dr. Jackal managed to twist the mind of the pure Suryanshi to become the Kekda man. He can breathe fire which contains an extremely dangerous poison that even impeded Shaktimaan. Shaktimaan left an illusion of him behind and narrowly escaped. Because he returns with only the illusion, Kekda man is destroyed by his short-tempered creator.

Jonk Jonkaa

Jonk (leech) is one of the two most dangerous clones of Dr. Jackal (along with Kekda Man); He was created by fusing genes of humans and alien leech from Mars. He has the power to eat any form of matter and grow larger in size. He was killed by Geeta and the campers using salt. Shaktimaan is however captured in a flying prison in the process.

Evil clone Shaktimaan

After capturing Shaktimaan, Dr. Jackal makes a clone of him but twists his mind to be a servant of darkness. The evil clone is created stronger than Shaktimaan and is unleashed on the world. When the real Shaktimaan escapes his prison, he challenges the evil clone to a fight. He then captures the clone and sends him into deep space.

Later, during the crash when Geeta and her father, Gyanesh, died, Dr. Jackal's missiles released him from his trap. He comes to the Earth searching for Shaktimaan, unable to find him as Shaktimaan had lost his power. Geeta is misled into believing the clone was the real Shaktimaan until he was killed by the real Shaktimaan who gained his power later.

Catsisters

Shalaka & Shaliyaa(portrayed by Ashwini kalsekar & Dolly Minhas) Kilvish sent Shaliyaa the white cat to kill Major Ranjith singh, However, in the process Shaliyaa failed in her attempt and cursed by kilvish as a cat. Years later kilvish Sent Shalaka the black cat to kill his son Shaktimaan with the wrong info that Shaliyaa was killed by Major Singh, so it is a chance to take revenge by his son Shaktimaan. Shalakaa captures Shaktimaan and tortures him. In the process she accidentally kills her sister, thinking the cat was Shaktimaan's supporter, and it is revealed that the whole time kilvish was lying to her. She leaves Shaktimaan and heads to Kilvish to kill him. However, she is stabbed and killed by Kilvish.

Teemiraa

Teemira (portrayed by Annu Kashyap) was another devil magician sent by Tamraaj to kill Shaktimaan in childhood but she failed. Tamraaj tortured her in a fire for several years for this. Later he again gives her a chance to kill Shaktimaan with a warning but Teemiraa was planning to kill both Shaktimaan and Tamraaj Kilvish. She drinks Human blood like a vampire so that she can maintain her charm and be young always. She kidnaps and tortures Geeta Vishwas and takes her form as an identity to set trap for Shaktimaan for making him as a partner, in the process kilvish kills her for her misbehaves.In 2005 Diamond Comics Shaktimaan issue "Paap Samraat" has a more detailed story with the encounters of teemira and baby Gangadhar.

Matandeeka

She was a devil creature who works for Kilvish, she hitches somebody on-road and kills him brutally by taking his spirit. She wants to become powerful, so she goes in front of Kilvish for her request. Kilvish tells her to Kill Shaktimaan and she will become what she wants. Her look was mostly similar to Teemiraa, she wears a red dress and also the background score of Teemiraa was played on her.

Toyman

Toyman's character was played by Brij Mohan Pandey. He is mentally a psycho lover who kills his love interest Shailaa after she lodged a complaint against him to the police. To make more profit, he made a weapons of a toys using low-priced colours which are harmful to children, causing death to many children and he was jailed after Shailaa reported it. He killed Shailaa on returning from Jail. Later he created dangerous toys as weapons to destroy Shaktimaan.

Kalushaah

She is a devil woman, running her black world as an agent of Tamraj Kilvish. She is so cruel that she kills her own servants who can't do her given work. She made the jungle of Karadunga, her penthouse, a mysterious place so that no one can come there. Once, she attacked Shaktimaan's father Ranjeet Singh when he tried to investigate the secrets of Karadunga. Later, Shaktimaan ruins her world, leaving her no way but to flee.

Maharani Mayadri

Her role was played by actress Sunila Karambekar as a villain. She enters when Shaktimaan, Dwijj, Geeta time-travel upon centuries Diamond Comics collect chakra, but they were unable as Queen Mayadri makes them her hostages. She thought of the Shaktimaan as Satya, the Mahaguru, who was once a king but later became a priest as he loves the environment of the forest. His fighting skills make maharani fell in love with him and she proposes to Satya, but he rejects her. It makes her angry and so psycho that she creates her own world where she rules like a queen. She also has many magical powers that nobody can destroy her. Later after telling the story to Shaktimaan, she also told him that she is immortal and nobody can kill her. Shaktimaan wants the time machine remote from Maharaniji which she stole from him while kidnapping Geeta and Dwijj to an unknown place. Shaktimaan requests Maharaniji to return the remote and free both hostages. For her love, she shows both Geeta and Dwijj. Later Maharaniji attacked Geeta with her magical dangerous rays so cruelly that she can be dead. What happened then is shown in the remaining episode.

Behroopia

She has the power to shapeshift to any appearance. On one occasion, she changes her appearance to that of Shaktimaan and engages in a fake fight to defame Shaktimaan. Later she again changes her shape to that of Geeta Vishwaas to give mislead people through an interview on television about Shaktimaan. Shaktimaan was able to reveal her real appearance to everyone later. Dr. Jackal punishes her angrily for her failure and kills her.

Sunanda

She was a mutant like Akansha. She can touch any electrical wave and make her powers. Her neighbours want to kill her as they think that she is a witch. She was saved by Suryanshi samuday, who want to help her. But she was kidnapped by Dr. Jackal. He offers her to make more powerful than Shaktimaan to revenge society. He converts her to a superwoman and uses her to destroy Shaktimaan's status with another devil woman Behroopia. Later Sunanda changes heart and surrenders after seeing the reality of Kilvish and Jaikaal.

Kitanuman

Kitanuman is an extremely dangerous green-coloured creature completely made from germs and is also one of the servants of Tamraj Kilvish. Thousands of years ago, Shri Satya turned him into a statue, and later he gets freed from the statue and spreads germs so badly and turn each and every child of the world into old men. Kitanuman was one of the most dangerous and difficult devils to defeat Shaktimaan and had a really tough time with him. However, later Shaktimaan kills him using his own germs. Later when Shaktimaan defeats and burns him in space, unknown to Shaktimaan his germs do not completely finish and are left in space. A space guard Sheena, while coming towards the earth sees and take the germs and store them in a protective jar and later along with another space guard Mr. Subkar they try to kill germs, but Dr. Jackal comes and injure them and takes the germs. He again brings Kitanuman back to life, but later Shaktimaan freezes Dr. Jackal, Nadia (his assistant), Kitanuman, along with 3 dangerous criminals name yellow man torture man captain cavity lived in shuroka planet in his neighbouring galaxy milky way of space and sentences them in the Inter-Galactic Prison (A prison made in a galaxy near the sun made by the space guards Mr. Subkar and Sheena).

Wolfa

An extremely dangerous humanoid clone created by Dr. Jackal. She was made by combining the genetic material of a human, a snake, and a wolf. She is the only clone with three animal attributes. Her main objective is to attract a person towards her and then kill them instantly by touch, and subsequently drink their blood. Later Shaktimaan kills her.

Pretola

Like Tamraj Kilvish he has also lived more than 6000 years and is a ghost-like creature he is extremely dangerous and when he gets hungry he eats away the body of the whole world and makes them ghosts, he gets hungry very often once in 1000 years. 6000 years ago when he was in space Shri Satya created a protective coating around the Earth, because of which he couldn't enter the Earth for 6000 years. The protective coating could be broken by Shri Satya only or his rebirth Shaktimaan which was impossible, but Tamraj Kilvish controlled Shaktimaan's brain with the power of smashed Divya mani and Shaktimaan broke the coating and allowed Pretolla to enter the Earth as soon as he entered he turned half of the people of Earth in ghosts as Tamraj Kilvish had only the half part of Shaktipunja (Pap Punja). Tamraj Kilvish sends his men to find the remaining part of Shaktipunja whereas Shaktimaan travels time in different time zone along with Geeta and Dwijj to collect 8 chakras and save the world. Later, Shaktimaan is successful in collecting 8 chakras of life from different time zones and saves the world, and Pretolla is sent out of the Earth and the protective coating is again made.

Dakoda

He is another devil sent by Tamraj Kilvish to kill Shaktimaan. He is completely made from fire and Tamraj Kilvish awoke him from thousands of years of his sleeping to kill Shaktimaan. He first spread destruction in the city by showing himself as Ranjeet Singh, Shaktimaan's father, but dies due to the attack of nitrogen gas which him, but he again re-emerges. Shaktimaan later killed him with nitrogen gas.

Lightman

He was created by Dr. Jackal when he was rescued from jail by Sahab, one of the main enemies of Shaktimaan. He released him from prison to help him to kill Shaktimaan, he created Lightman by cloning one hair of Shaktimaan and sunlight. Later Shaktimaan took all light from Lightman and took it inside his body which made him extremely weak but he managed to fly to the sun and transferred the light in the sun.

Plastica

Dr. Jackal was made of plastic and released dangerous poisonous gas which kills people in seconds. She can stretch any part of her body and there is no way to kill her.

Froga

He is a half-human half frog, he is really powerful and has a really long and sticky tongue which is really dangerous. His tongue is his main power source which he uses to catch its prey. He (along with Visdhar, Behroopia, and Chinksu) spread a lot of destruction in the city but was defeated by Shaktiman and three other powerful Suryanshis.

Stone-man

He was created by Kapala, a servant of Tamraj Kilvish using his magic skull. He is made entirely of stone. His glance can turn any inanimate object to stone. On humans, the glance can only petrify them. His glance follows the rules of electromagnetic radiation and can be reflected. The Stone-man kidnaps Santa Claus from a party and disguises himself as the Santa. When he starts attacking Shaktimaan at the party, Shaktimaan cleverly evades his glances. Shaktimaan uses a metal tray to turn his glance back to him, petrifying the Stone-man. He then switches appearances with Stone-man and deceives Kapala into attacking him. Kapala is hurt badly and Shaktimaan uses this opportunity to destroy the magic skull of Kapala. The Stone-man disappears when the skull is destroyed.

Chinksu

He is really powerful in hand-to-hand combat and is an expert in martial arts. He can break trees into two pieces with his one punch. He (along with Froga, Behroopia, and Visdhar) spread a lot of destruction in the city but was defeated by Shaktiman and three other powerful Suryanshis.

Visdhar

He is half-snake half-human and releases extremely dangerous poison from his mouth. His poison weakens Shaktimaan. He (along with Froga, Behroopia, and Chinksu) spread a lot of destruction in the city but was defeated by Shaktiman and three other powerful Suryanshis.

Dr. Chandola

Dr. Chandola is a mad scientist who aspired to create an army of humans from dead bodies resurrected with electricity. His first experiment was his own son, who he personally kills to create Electric Man. Although he was involved in the grave robbing crimes, he was not shown successful with any of the dead bodies he collected. When Electric Man comes to life, he kills Dr. Chandola and his associates.

=== Other characters ===
The family of three daughter-in-laws

A family with three daughters-in-law from three different communities, Rachna (Punjabi), Shalini (Bengali), and a South Indian always fights with each other. Gangadhar as a servant and cook enters the family and creates happiness among them.

Mr. Sabkar

An alien space guard, who is extremely powerful but not evil. He is on the side of truth and he is so powerful that bullets, electricity, etc. do not harm him, his mind works faster than computers and can also fly. Therefore, his name is Sabkar. Sab means "everything" and kar means " done". He can do many things which are beyond a normal human-like he can stay underwater for hours without breathing. He became popular by name Sabkar in media particularly in Krtv channel in which Geeta and Gangadhar work and so they were sent for Sabkar interview to know if he is another identity of Shaktimaan. He (along with Sheena another powerful space guard) was in the process of killing the germs of Kitanuman when Dr. Jackal attacked them and they had to flee. Even Suriyanshis do not know about it. He (along with Sheena) is the owner of InterGalactic Prison. Later in a spaceship, they follow Jaikal but Jaikal blasts their spaceship, and Mr. Sabkar and Sheena are badly injured and turn. So Shaktimaan finds a special flower to save them and in the process, he catches Dr. Jackal and then freezes him along with the others in the InterGalactic Prison (A prison made in a galaxy near the sun made by the space guards Mr. Subkar and Sheena). When Mr. Subkar and Sheena are saved they are about to leave, the mayor of the city, Kumar Ranjan comes and names them foreign spies living visas and does not allow them to go. Later to defame Shaktimaan he spreads a virus in the city and says it is done by the space guards. Also, he kidnaps Mr. Subkar and Sheena and tells it's done by Shaktimaan and an arrest comes out for Shaktimaan, but Mr. Subkar and Sheena brings the truth by showing the real face of Kumar Ranjan.

Sheena

Another powerful space guard. She first came to the earth in her space, when Shaktimaan tried to stop her he was attacked by powerful rays from her space. Like Mr. Subkar's electricity and bullets do not harm her, her mind is faster than a computer and she can also fly. She (along with Mr. Subkar) is the owner of InterGalactic Prison. Sheena and Mr. Subkar were the first people who saw Shaheb's real face and made him arrested by the police. Later in a spaceship, they follow Jaikal but Jaikal blasts their spaceship, and Mr. Subkar and Sheena are badly injured and turn. So Shaktimaan finds a special flower to save them and in the process, he catches Dr. Jackal and then freezes him along with the others in the Inter-Galactic Prison (A prison made in a galaxy near the sun made by the space guards Mr. Subkar and Sheena). When Mr. Subkar and Sheena are saved they are about to leave Mayor of the city Kumar Ranjan comes and names them foreign spy living visas and does not allow them to go. Later to defame Shaktimaan he spreads a virus in the city and says it is done by the space guards. Also kidnaps Mr. Subkar and Sheena and tells it's done by Shaktimaan and an arrest comes out for Shaktimaan, but Mr. Subkar and Sheena bring the truth by showing the real face of Kumar Ranjan.

Dr. Shishir

He is considered one of the strongest Suryavanshis and has telekinetic powers through which he can attract his victims towards him and also paralyze them. He lives with Sanjeev Mahashay in the hidden headquarters of the Suryavanshis in the city, where he also has a hospital and helps Shaktimaan fight against the evil forces of Tamraj Kilvish.

Vivek / Andhi and Abhimanyu

He is a really powerful Suryanshi he has the power of wind and it comes out from his eyes. He lives with Sanjeev Mahashay at the secret places of Suryanshis in the city and even runs a hospital. One blow from his mouth throws the person wherever he wants. He is later killed by Tamraj Kilvish but his brother Abhimanuv has the same powers. He joins them and fills his place and also helped Shaktimaan many times in defeating Tamraj Kilvish's armies.

Abhinav / Vidyut

He is a really powerful Suryanshi he has the power of fire and fire rays come out from his eyes. He lives with Sanjeev Mahashay at the secret places of Suryanshis in the city and even runs a hospital. He has also helped Shaktimaan many times in defeating Tamraj Kilvish's armies. He is also rarely shown using 'Murli-Magic', to ensnare his gurus to act upon his will.

Sanjeev Mahashay

The Chief head of all the Suryanshis places in the city. He first met Shaktimaan as Gangadhar when he lost his memory. He is a genius and is very powerful, with the help of his brainpower he can break anything and even kill anyone. He has the power of Earth and his voice reaches till the end of the earth wherever he wants he is the head of a hospital.

Jwaala and Euroo

They are aliens from Sudoku planet. They landed on earth to save their lives from the three evil aliens who want to destroy everything. Later Dr. Jackal kidnaps them, to use their powers for darkness (andhera).

Kamini

Nupur Alankaar plays the role of Kaamini, a flirty, filmy gossip writer in the newspaper Aaj ki Aawaz. She often attempts to flirt with Gangaadhar and fires taunts at Geeta.

Shaila

Toyman is like a friend to Shaila. But Toyman loves her. After using poisonous colours in toys many children die. As a result, Toyman is sent to jail. Shaila begins hating him and never wants to see his ugly face again. She is later married to a new man. When Toyman discovers this, he finds her and kills her along with her whole family.

Shalu

Shalu is a small-time thief turned fan of Shaktimaan. Her accomplice is Tilly, another crook. She is someone who has lost faith in the system and adopted a life of crime. However, her adoration for Shaktimaan starts cultivating good thoughts in her. She has a tomboy personality and is courageous enough to take on multiple goons. She has moderate skill in hand-to-hand combat.

== Reception ==
In an interview with Nupur Rekhi of Indiantelevision.com, Khanna told that he has even received letters from the external affairs minister and then Prime Minister of India Atal Bihari Vajpayee saying that he has done a very good thing in choosing the role of Shaktimaan and keeping up with it. He has been featured in The Asian Wall Street Journal on the front page reflecting on Shaktimaan's (and hence Khanna's) positive influence on children.

When Shaktimaan aired on Doordarshan, there were a lot of controversies created as children set themselves on fire or jumped off buildings hoping that Shaktimaan would save them. In an effort to promote responsible behaviour among children, Mukesh Khanna spent a substantial part of the airtime in explaining to the children that the stunts shown on television were not real and should not be emulated. Khanna also stated that most of the controversies were fake and were raised in the media to undermine its popularity.

The series was also popular in Bhutan, even before the introduction of a national television channel. Students skipped Saturday classes to watch the show, while drawings of the title character were drawn by local children in roads, walls and books.

== Other media ==
Shaktimaan has generated other media including comic books, Animated series, Television film, and YouTube mini-episodes with characters from the series.

=== Comic books ===
Comic books appeared featuring Shaktimaan and published in many Indian languages as well as English in association with Diamond Comics and Raj Comics. Raj Comics published 13 titles.

=== Shaktimaan: The Animated Series (2011–2012) ===
Shaktimaan: The Animated Series produced by Reliance Animation was aired on Sonic from 2011 to 2012.

=== Hamara Hero Shaktimaan (2013) ===
Hamara Hero Shaktimaan (Our Hero Shaktimaan) is a television film that aired on Pogo TV on 30 June 2013.

=== Sorry Shaktimaan (2019–present) ===
On 15 March 2019, a show named Sorry Shaktimaan started on a YouTube channel having the same name. It is the educational section of Shaktimaan.

=== Dhamaka (2020) ===
A Shaktimaan reference was made in the 2020 Malayalam language romantic comedy film Dhamaka in which a character visualises another character as Shaktimaan. Mukesh Khanna initially wanted to take legal action against the makers but later allowed them to use the reference.

=== Shaktimaan film trilogy ===
Shaktimaan is an upcoming Indian superhero film in the franchise. Mukesh Khanna officially confirmed on his official YouTube channel that he is making Shaktimaan not only with Sony Pictures Networks India but with Sony International. On 10 February 2022, SPE India made the announcement on Twitter with a short concept video showing the rise of Shaktimaan. It was also reported that the film would be part of a trilogy.

== Future ==
On 8 November 2024, Mukesh Khanna, owner of Bheeshm International, released a teaser video on the company's YouTube channel announcing the anticipated return of Shaktimaan. The teaser featured memorable scenes from the original series and hinted at the revival of the character, with Khanna stating, "It's time for him to return."

=== Games ===
Zapak, an Indian mobile video game developer has released adaptations of the animated TV series including Shaktimaan, Shaktimaan: Tab.

== See also ==
- Space Sheriff Gavan
- Superman
