= Bambai Ka Babu (1996 film) =

- Directed by: Vikram Bhatt
- Written by: Iqbal Raj
- Produced by: Ravi Vachani
- Starring: Saif Ali Khan; Kajol; Atul Agnihotri
- Cinematography: Bhushan Patel
- Edited by: Waman Bhonsle
- Music by: Anand–Milind
- Release date: 22 March 1996
- Country: India
- Language: Hindi
- Budget: ₹22.50 million
- Box office: ₹31 million

Bambai Ka Babu (transl. Gentleman of Bombay) is a 1996 Indian Hindi-language action drama film directed by Vikram Bhatt. It stars Saif Ali Khan, Atul Agnihotri and Kajol. The film's music by Anand–Milind was a major highlight.

== Plot summary ==
Born and brought up in a small village by foster parents, Vikram, alias Vicky comes to Mumbai - the big city - to find his fortune. He wants to get rich soon, and he does get lucky when fate, his confidence, courage, and good looks land him a job with a politician-cum-criminal named Masterji. He also meets a bar dancer named Anita and loves blossoms. Masterji starts him off with petty crimes, just to ensure his capabilities. Through his hard work and dedication, Vicky soon wins the respect of Masterji and his colleagues, especially one trusted man of Masterji named Vinayak More.

He soon becomes Bambai ka babu. Then Vicky is entrusted with the task of subduing Masterji's rival, Jaya Shetty, which he does easily. Then instead of being disposed of, Jaya is asked to make friends with Masterji, so as to benefit the latter. But soon, Vicky learns of Masterji's plan with Jaya to incite communal violence as a means of indirectly winning the elections, so he decides to sabotage their plans. Angered at this, Masterji orders the death of Vicky at any cost. Vicky has nowhere to turn to, except to live in fear for the rest of his life, as sooner or later, Jaya and Masterji's men will track him down.

Amit, Vicky's stepbrother in his village, in the meantime, hears of all that is taking place in Mumbai, and decides to come to find Vicky and bring him back home. He meets Neha, a freelancing press photographer, with whom love blossoms, and he teams up to find Vicky. They soon learn that everyone believes that Vicky is dead, killed in communal violence, with his charred body and belongings in the mortuary. But Amit does not agree, as he does not find a chain there that he had given Vicky before the latter had left for Bombay. They find Vinayak More and Anita, from whom they learn that Vicky is actually alive and in hiding.

The four soon decide to expose Masterji and prevent any more communal violence in the city. Neha and Amit lodge a complaint against Masterji, which infuriates him, and he gives orders to kill them. Jaya and his men attack them, but Vicky intervenes and kills all of them except Jaya, who immediately tells Masterji that Vicky is alive. The all-the-more infuriated Masterji now orders that Vicky be killed. Vicky and his friends decide that Masterji's conversations must be brought to the light, so Neha manages to sneak into Masterji's house and fixes microphones in his telephone receivers without being noticed, but soon gets caught. At this point, it is revealed that Neha is actually Masterji's illegitimate daughter. This softens the criminal, but he still locks up his daughter.

From their hideout, Vicky and Amit record all of Masterji's plots on the phone, and also get to know that Neha is captured. With the help of More, they manage to bring Masterji alone to a deserted house on the pretext of having to meet the ruling party CM for discussions. And in the meantime, More fools Jaya into destroying Masterji's house completely, saying that it is to fool the public into believing that "Masterji was also affected by the riots" and thus remove any suspicions from the public. Vicky and Amit, in the meantime, run to Masterji's crumbling abode and rescue Neha.

Masterji returns to find his mansion burnt down. But he finds More and tortures him into revealing the whereabouts of Vicky and Amit. He soon finds them, shoots More before them, and orders that they are beaten and killed. Neha and Anita are forcefully taken away.

Beaten badly, Amit and Vicky are chained, and the place is set on fire by the goons. But they manage to free themselves amidst the fires and escape.

The goons take the girls to an abandoned village and bind them with time bombs ticking away. But Amit arrives on the scene and kills all of them one by one, lastly killing Jaya.

Finally, the climax reaches a point where Masterji is giving a speech to a crowd to win their support for elections, and Vicky appears and plays the tape with the former's wicked schemes. The people are aroused. Vicky thrashes Masterji and makes him confess to his crimes, which he does. The enraged public then gangs up the criminal and rough him up.

Amit arrives at the scene with Neha and Anita. Neha's eyes are filled with tears on seeing her father, but Amit says, "there's no need to grieve over something that was never found". The film finally ends with all the four returning to the heroes village happily.

== Cast ==
- Saif Ali Khan as Vikram "Vicky"
- Atul Agnihotri as Amit
- Kajol as Neha
- Vaishnavi Mahant as Anita
- Dalip Tahil as Masterji
- Vishwajeet Pradhan as Jaya Shetty
- Saeed Jaffrey as Vicky's father
- Reema Lagoo as Beena, Vicky's mother
- Viju Khote as Vinayak More
- Mushtaq Khan as Commissioner D.A. Chauhan
- Harish Magon as Inspector Sahu
- Manmauji as Restaurant owner

== Reception ==
Kajol and Saif had made a successful pair in the film and it had a very successful and melodious soundtrack. However, this couldn’t save the film in the box office and it flopped.

== Soundtrack ==
Anand–Milind teamed up with Vikram Bhatt for the second time after Madhosh (1994), along with lyricist Sameer. The songs were popular after the release of the film.

#	Title	Singer(s)
1	"Bambai Ka Babu"	Abhijeet
2	"Chori Chori"	Kumar Sanu & Alka Yagnik
3	"Ham Nikal Pade"	Udit Narayan, Kumar Sanu, Alka Yagnik & Bela Sulakhe
4	"Honge Kabhi Ab Na Juda"	Kumar Sanu & Alka Yagnik
5	"Sapne Hai Yaadein Hai"	Kumar Sanu & Sadhana Sargam
6	"Tham Zara"	Udit Narayan & Kumar Sanu
7	"Ure Baba"	Alisha Chinoy
