= Shaktimaan: The Animated Series =

2011 Indian animated television show directed by Vikram Veturi

- Genre: Action; Superhero
- Based on: Shaktimaan
- Written by: Jeffrey Scott
- Directed by: Vikram Veturi
- Country of origin: India
- Original language: English
- No. of episodes: 26

Production
- Producer: Ashish S.K.
- Editor: J.V. Varaprasad
- Running time: 23 minutes
- Production companies: Reliance Animation; Bheeshm International

Original release
- Network: Nickelodeon Sonic
- Release: 20 December 2011

Shaktimaan: The Animated Series is a 2011 Indian animated television show based on the live-action series of the same name. Produced by Reliance Animation in association with Accel Animation Studios, the series centers around Vehaan Arya, a young college student who uses his yogic superpowers to become Shaktimaan and defeat the evil forces of Kilvish, who wants to destroy the world.

Set in a fictional city named Indus City, the series consists of 26 episodes, and each episode features Kilvish plotting to destroy the world and Shaktimaan saving it with his superpowers and guidance from the 7 gurus who trained him and Kilvish. The scripts were written by Emmy Award winner Jeffrey Scott. The protagonist Vehaan Arya, a college student and lab assistant, is based on Pandit Gangadhar Vidyadhar Mayadhar Omkarnath Shastri, a photojournalist played by Mukesh Khanna in the live-action series.

Also dubbed in Hindi, Bengali, Telugu and Tamil languages, the series was aired on Nickelodeon Sonic in 2011, and on Discovery Kids in 2016. Following the first season's success, it was re-aired on Nickelodeon from 7 May 2012. It was also released on DVD in all four languages via Reliance Home Video. The 13th episode Shaktimaan: Unfinished Business won the 2012 FICCI BAF Award for Best Animated TV Episode.

== Plot ==
Vehaan Arya is a college student who starts attending the Indus City University as his "cover" and becomes a lab assistant to Professor Gyani, the head of computer science department who is often assisted by Louise, a computer program with the memories of his dearly departed mother. Vehaan befriends Leena, a journalism student who in need of a "big scoop" to become a broadcast journalist. In the meanwhile, Kilvish recruits his henchmen Tick and Tock, to assist him with his evil acts. When the city comes in danger, Vehaan seeks guidance from his 7 yogic gurus who bless him with superpowers and saves everyone from an evil giant robot. Unaware of his true identity, Leena names him Shaktimaan and decides to collect his news in order to get a job. Soon, it is revealed that both Vehaan and Kilvish were the students of the 7 yogic gurus, who chose the former in a competition due to his humane traits while Kilvish wasn't due to his aggressive usage of his superpowers. An enraged Kilvish unleashed his evil powers and killed Vehaan's friends, something that continues to traumatize the latter to date.

Louise witnesses Vehaan using his superpowers to save everyone in the lab, but promises to keep it a secret when he convinces her to do so. He is joined by Bumpy, his roommate who soon becomes his best friend. Leena's brother Chikoo adores Shaktimaan and aspires to be like him. General D’Goze, the head of a secret military commando unit, despises Shaktimaan for being the true hero and getting all the credit and news coverage. Using Gyani's gadgets, he futilely attempts to thwart Kilvish's evil plots himself, only to comically fail each time. Kilvish keeps putting Shaktimaan through physical challenges ranging from monsters to natural disasters to plagues to alien invasions. Dr. Jackal, an evil scientist and Professor Gyani's greatest archenemy, joins hands with Kilvish to seek his revenge and in the process destroy the world, only to find Shaktimaan saving it and defeating them again and again.

== Characters ==
These are the primary characters appearing in the series.

- Vehaan Arya/Shaktimaan: A young college student who works as a lab assistant to Professor Gyani at Indus City University, Vehaan wants to help himself develop a super powerful antivirus software that will ultimately destroy Kilvish for good. As his superhero alter-ego Shaktimaan, he uses his limitless superpowers to fight evil forces and save the day, apart from inspiring everyone, especially kids, to do the right thing. Shaktimaan's powers originate from five chakras (energy centers), namely the Astral, Heart, Vibration, Psychic, and Wisdom Chakras. The only limit to his powers is his own belief in himself and his knowledge of how to manifest his powers. He is voiced by Damandeep Singh Baggan.
- Leena Ray: A journalism student at the Indus City University and Vehaan's friend, Leena wants to become a journalist and runs a blog called Leena Ray 24/7 and with her mini HD camera or smartphone, records interviews and situations mainly featuring herself. She believes that the key to her journalistic dreams is getting a scoop on Shaktimaan, who saves her whenever she is in danger. She is voiced by Pooja Punjabi.
- Professor Gyani: He runs the AI lab at the Indus City University. He aims to create the world's first artificially intelligent anti-virus in order to protect the world's computers from cyber attacks, while Vehaan wants it in order to destroy Kilvish. Professor Gyani frequently teams up with Vehaan and often develops defensive computer-controlled smart weapons for use by the army to fight Kilvish. Like most people, he too is unaware of the fact that Vehaan is Shaktimaan. He is voiced by Vinod Kulkarni.
- Louise: Created by Professor Gyani, LOUISE (Laser Optical Unified Intelligent Software Entity) is an AI supercomputer based on personality traits from his dear departed mother. She is fond of Vehaan and even promises to keep his identity as Shaktimaan a secret. Vehaan and Professor turn to her whenever it comes to saving the world from Kilvish.
- Dr. Jackol: Often pronounced as Dr. Jackal, he is an evil scientist and Professor Gyani's greatest archenemy since the latter got him arrested. Escaping from prison, Jackol joins hands with Kilvish, who wants him to defeat Shaktimaan in the process of exacting revenge upon Professor Gyani. He is voiced by Lalit Agarwal.
- Tick and Tock: They're Kilvish's henchmen who work for him half out of fear and half out of hopes of someday becoming powerful and wealthy. Tick is a gaunt, black-haired man and Tock is a giant man. Together, they execute the missions assigned to them by Kilvish and often end up foiling his plans unintentionally. They're voiced by Ajay Singhal.
- General D’Goze: An angry, strict soldier who pretends to be tough but is actually timid. General D’Goze despises Shaktimaan for getting all the fame and credit. He relies on Professor Gyani's gadgets and tries in vain to thwart Kilvish's plans, only to find himself failing and at times, even rescued by Shaktimaan. However, he controls the government funding that subsidizes the lab and often threatens the professor to do whatever he wants, or he'll cut off the funding. He is voiced by Manoj Pandey.
- Major Meek: The sidekick of General D'Goze, he does all the dirty work for him and believes Vehaan to be hiding something from everyone. He fails whenever he tries to find out Vehaan's secret in order to impress the general and get promoted.
- Bumpy Morgan: Vehaan's roommate and best friend, Bumpy, an aspiring actor in the university's drama department, is the only human who's aware of Vehaan's identity as Shaktimaan and often assists him whenever he needs assistance with something he's too busy to handle. Bumpy is a nervous boy who dreams of stardom but doesn't want to work hard for it. He is voiced by Rajesh Kava.
- ACP: Indus City Police Force's most decorated police officer, ACP is obsessed with catching criminals and keeping Indus City safe. He, however, despises Shaktimaan, and often tries to prove that it was he who trained Shaktimaan to become the hero that people perceive him as. He is voiced by Ravi Rajesh.
- The 7 gurus: Based in the Himalayas, these are the seven gurus who trained Vehaan/Shaktimaan and Kilvish. Representing the 7 chakras of a man, they have no names and are differentiated only by the color of their robes. Shaktimaan often communicates with them if he needs advice to get out of some difficult situation. He can reach them psychologically and usually trains with just one of his gurus, though the others may be present. One of the gurus is voiced by Kumar Pravesh.
- Kilvish: An evil student of the 7 gurus who also trained Vehaan, Kilvish also possesses superpowers and uses them for destructive purposes. Dwelling in a dark, mysterious underground lair and possessing advanced technology and dark mysticism, he wants to destroy all goodness that stands in his way, which is why Shaktimaan becomes his greatest archenemy. He creates human and inhuman monsters to battle Shaktimaan. He is voiced by Shailendra Pandey.

== Episodes ==
The series consists of two seasons featuring 13 episodes each.

1 – The Battle Begins

2 – Subway To Disaster

3 – Fuels Rush In

4 – Genius' Fly Trap

5 – The Taj Kilvish

6 – Descent Into Darkness

7 – Terror In The Sky

8 – Tsunami!

9 – Blackout

10 – Endangered Species

11 – Zombie Attack!

12 – Volcanic Villain

13 – Unfinished Business

14 – True Identity

15 – Jackol's Revenge

16 – Madman At Work

17 – Out Of Focus

18 – Return Of Kilvish

19 – Demon Lord

20 – Gorilla Trap

21 – Negative Nex

22 – Kite Fright

23 – Shaktimaan Unmasked

24 – Crystal Of Darkness

25 – Dark League

26 – Ultimate Power

== Games ==
Zapak, an Indian mobile video game developer has released adaptations of the animated TV series including Shaktimaan, Shaktimaan: Tab.
