= Mukesh Khanna =

Indian television and film actor (born 1958)

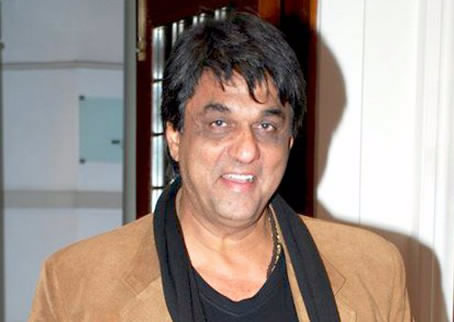
- Born: 23 June 1958 (age 68); Bombay, Bombay State, India
- Education: St. Xavier's College, Mumbai; Film and Television Institute of India
- Occupations: Actor; Producer; Talk show host
- Years active: 1980–present

YouTube information
- Channel: Bheeshm International
- Years active: 2019–present
- Genres: Entertainment and Informational
- Subscribers: 1.37 million
- Views: 205 million
- Last updated: 4 August, 2026

Mukesh Khanna (born 23 June 1958) is an Indian actor, producer, and talk show host known for his work in Hindi films and television. He is best known for portraying the titular superhero in the television series Shaktimaan (1997–2005), which he also created and produced, and for his role as Bhishma in B. R. Chopra's Mahabharat (1988–1990). He has also appeared in television series such as Pyaar Ka Dard Hai Meetha Meetha Pyaara Pyaara (2012–2013).

== Early life and education ==
Khanna was born into a Khatri family of Punjabi Hindus, with roots in Multan and Dipalpur. His family had moved from West Punjab to Bombay due to the Partition of India in 1947.

Following his higher education at Mumbai's St. Xavier's College, earning a Bachelor of Science (BSc) degree and a Master of Laws (LLM) degree, he later completed an acting course from the Film and Television Institute of India (FTII) in Pune.

== Non-acting work ==
=== Chairman of the Children's Film Society India ===
Khanna was also the chairman of the Children's Film Society India, from which he resigned in February 2018.

=== YouTube channel ===
He is also the founder and director of the entertainment company Bheeshm International. He is currently running The Mukesh Khanna Show on his own YouTube channel, Bheeshm International.

== Filmography ==
=== Television ===
Year	Series	Role	Notes
1988–1990	Mahabharat	Bhishma	Debut serial
1989	Vishwamitra	Vishvamitra	
1990	Chunni	Karamjeet Singh	
1994–1996	Chandrakanta	Janbaaz/Meghawat	
1994	The Great Maratha	Ibrahim Khan Gardi	
1995–1996	Marshall	Marshall	
1995–1996	Saraab	Ajay/Vijay	
1996–1998	Yug	Darshan Lal	
1997–1998	Vishwaas	Vijay Verma	
1997–1998	Mahabharat Katha	Bhishma	Sequel to Mahabharat
1997	Mahayodha	Virat	Also producer
1997–2005	Shaktimaan	Shaktimaan/Pandit Gangadhar Shastri/Major Ranjit Singh/Shri Satya/Clone SHAKTIMAAN	Also producer
1997–1998	Maharana Pratap – The Pride of India	Rana Sangha	
2002–2003	Aryamaan – Brahmaand Ka Yodha	Aryamaan/Ojwan/Narrator	Also producer
2003	Deewar	Vikram Singh	
2003	Ehsaas	Digvijay Singh Rathore	
2007	Sautela	Vikram Arya/Vikrant	Also producer
2008	Kal Hamara Hai	Professor Vimalkant Vishnoyi	
2008	Waqt Batayega Kaun Apna Kaun Paraya	Biswajeet Raichowdhury	
2009	Ssshhhh...Koi Hai	Panini Guruji	episode: Nishan
2012–2013	Pyaar Ka Dard Hai Meetha Meetha Pyaara Pyaara	Purushottam Deewan	
2013	Hamara Hero Shaktimaan	Shaktimaan	Also producer Television film
2016	Waaris	Lala Pratap Singh Bajwa	

=== Videos ===
Year	Title	Role	Notes
2020	Shaktimaan Masked	Shaktimaan/Also Producer	To spread awareness about COVID-19
2021	Shambhu Ki Yaari	Devotee (Presented)	Bhajan on lord Shiva

=== Web ===
Year	Series	Role	Notes
2019–2020	Sorry Shaktimaan	Himself/Shaktimaan	Also producer
2020–present	The Mukesh Khanna Show	Host	Also producer
2021	Kailash Parvat: An Unsolved Mystery	Host	Also producer

=== Films ===
Year	Title	Role	Notes
1981	Roohi	Prakash	Debut film
1982	Waqt Ke Shahzade	Samson aka Sunny	
1983	Dard-E-Dil	Govinda	
1984	Captain Barry		
1985	Mujhe Kasam Hai	Rakesh	
1991	Saugandh	Chaudhary Sarang	
1991	Saudagar	Gagan	
1992	Tahalka	Major Krishna Rao	
1992	Yalgaar	Mahendra Ashwini Kumar	
1993	Meri Aan	Commissioner Ashfaque Khan	
1993	Kundan	Editor Sharma	
1993	Rani Aur Maharani		
1993	Shaktimaan	Diler	
1994	Rakhwale		
1994	Mohabbat Ki Aarzoo	Rai Bahadur Mahendra Pratap Singh	
1994	Insaaniyat		Narrator
1994	Betaj Badshah	Balwan	
1994	Main Khiladi Tu Anari	Arjun Joglekar	
1994	Amaanat	Agarwal Seth	
1994	Aao Pyar Karen	Shankar	
1994	Pathreela Raasta	Inspector Arjun	
1995	Police Lockup	Inspector Pratham	
1995	Hukumnama	Inspector Rajan	
1995	Pathreela Rasta	Inspector Arjun	
1995	Reshma		
1995	Jawab	Rajeshwar	
1995	Paandav	Ashwin Kumar	
1995	Maidan-E-Jung	S.P. Arun	
1995	Policewala Gunda	Inspector Chauhan	
1995	Nazar Ke Samne	Baadshah Khan	
1995	Raja	Rana Mahendra Pratap Garhwal	
1995	Taaqat	Police Inspector Khushwant Singh Bedi	
1995	Guddu	Vikram Bahadur	
1995	Veer	Tiger	
1995	Barsaat	Baba	
1996	Jagannath		
1996	Himmat	Inspector D'Souza	
1996	Himmatwar	Inspector Rajeshwar	
1996	Bal Brahmachari	Thakur Raghuveer Singh	
1997	Aakhri Sanghursh	Shakti Singh	
1997	Nazarr	Commissioner	
1997	Salma Pe Dil Aa Gaya	Sardar Gul Khan	
1997	Judge Mujrim	Mangal Singh	
1997	Agnee Morcha	Saleem	
1998	Mahayuddh		
1998	Keemat:They Are Back	Suraj Pratap Singh	
1998	Zulm-O-Sitam	Ins. Liyaqat Khan	
1999	Jaalsaaz	Advocate D.K. Khanna	
1999	International Khiladi	Bismillah	
2000	Gang	Lala	
2000	Khauff	S.P. Jaidev Singh	
2000	Hera Pheri	Police Commissioner Prakash	
2001	Censor		
2001	Ek Aur Jung		
2001	Hamari Bahu		
2003	Tada		
2004	Plan	Alibhai	Special appearance
2004	Mission Mumbai	Inspector Indrajeet	
2005	Dhana 51	Mahesh Chandra	Telugu film
2005	Hanuman	Hanuman (voice)	
2005	The Film	Police Commissioner of Mumbai	
2009	Chal Chalein	Justice Bharat Kumar	
2010	Barood: (The Fire) - A Love Story	Abhay Kumar	
2012	Akkad Bakkad Bam Be Bo	Ins. Vikram	
2012	Krishna Aur Kans	Akroor (voice) and Narrator	
2014	Ardha Gangu Ardha Gondya		Marathi film
2014	Rajadhi Raja	Sikhander	Malayalam film
2014	Money Back Guarantee	God	
2022	3 Shyaane	Businessman	
2024	Purushothamudu	Harsha Vardhan Khanna	Telugu film
2025	Vishwaguru	Kashyap	Gujarati film

== Awards and nominations ==
Year	Award	Category	Title	Result	Ref.
2013	Indian Telly Awards	Best Actor in a Supporting Role	Pyaar Ka Dard Hai Meetha Meetha Pyaara Pyaara	Nominated	
