= Victor Banerjee filmography =

Films starring Victor Banerjee

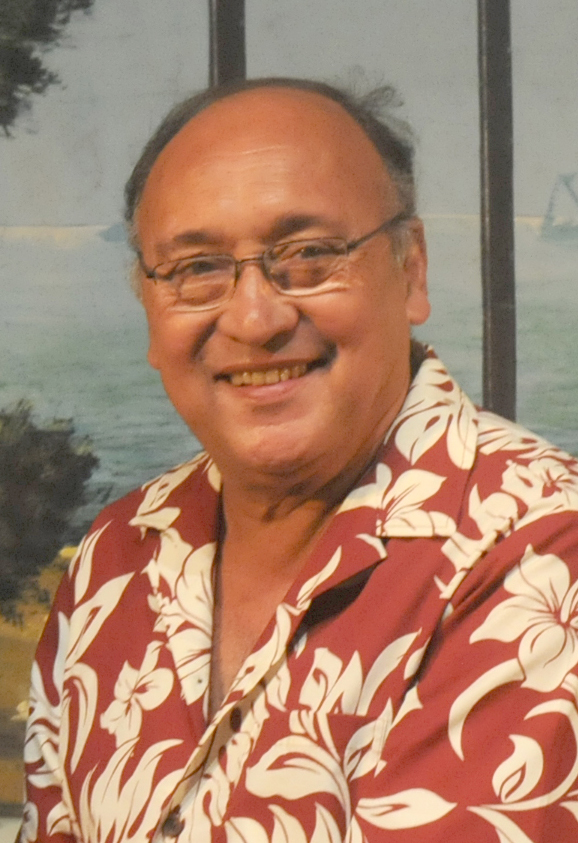
Victor Banerjee at the Closing Ceremony of the North East Films, during the 44th International Film Festival of India (IFFI-2013), in Panaji

Victor Banerjee is an internationally acclaimed Indian actor known for his work in Bengali, Hindi, Assamese and English-language cinema. He began his film career with Shatranj Ke Khilari, directed by Satyajit Ray, in 1977. Banerjee gained global recognition for portraying Dr. Aziz in A Passage to India, directed by David Lean. His performance earned him a nomination for the BAFTA Award for Best Actor, along with the Evening Standard British Film Award and the National Board of Review Award.

Over the course of his career, Victor Banerjee has collaborated with renowned filmmakers such as Roman Polanski, James Ivory, Mrinal Sen, and Shyam Benegal. In Bengali cinema, some of his notable performances include Ghare Baire, Mahaprithivi, and Lathi. He received the National Film Award for Best Supporting Actor for his role in Ghare Baire.

In recognition of his outstanding contribution to Indian cinema, the Government of India honored him with the Padma Bhushan in 2022. With a career spanning more than four decades, Victor Banerjee remains an important figure bridging Indian and international cinema.

== Films ==
Year	Title	Role	Director	Language	Note
1977	Shatranj Ke Khilari	Prime Minister	Satyajit Ray	Hindi, English	debut film
1978	Hullabaloo Over Georgie and Bonnie's Pictures	Maharaja	James Ivory	English	British Indian film
1980	Dui Prithibi	Kunal Dutta	Pijush Basu	Bengali	
1981	Pikoo	Hitesh	Satyajit Ray	Bengali	
1981	Kalyug	Dhan Raj / Duryodhana	Shyam Benegal	Hindi	
1982	Jaipur Junction		Werner Schaefer	German	West Germany film
1982	Arohan	Jotdar Bibhutibhushan Ganguly	Shyam Benegal	Hindi	
1983	Doosri Dulhan	Anil	Lekh Tandon	Hindi	
1983	Protidan		Prabhat Roy	Bengali	
1984	Ghare Baire	Nikhilesh "Nikhil" Choudhury	Satyajit Ray	Bengali	
1984	A Passage to India	Dr. Aziz	David Lean	English	UK, US film
1985	Pratigya		Asit Sen	Bengali	
1986	Foreign Body	Ram Das	Ronald Neame	English	United Kingdom film
1987	Pratikar		Prabhat Roy	Bengali	
1987	Ekanta Apon		Biresh Chatterjee	Bengali	
1988	Dadah Is Death	Karpal Singh	Jerry London	English	Australian film
1988	Aagoon		Victor Banerjee	Bengali	
1989	Aakrosh	Samrat	Sujit Guha	Bengali	
1990	Byabodhan		Dilip Mukherjee	Bengali	
1990	Debota		Abhijit Sen	Bengali	
1991	Mahaprithibi	Elder Son	Mrinal Sen	Bengali	
1992	Bitter Moon	Mr. Isaiah Singh	Roman Polanski	Frence, English	French film
1996	Lathi	Atindra Mohan Banerjee	Prabhat Roy	Bengali	
1996	Mahaan		Haranath Chakraborty	Bengali	
1998	Moner Moto Mon	Rani's father	Montazur Rahman Akbar	Bengali	Indo-Bangladesh joint production
1999	Tumi Ele Tai			Bengali	
2001	Dada Thakur		Haranath Chakraborty	Bengali	
2002	Deva	Prabhakar Chowdhury	Sujit Guha	Bengali	
2002	Chandramallika		Anjan Choudhury	Bengali	
2002	Antarghaat	Pratap	Tathagata Bhattacherjee	Bengali	
2002	Ferari Fauj		Prasanta Bal	Bengali	Guest appearance
2003	Bhoot	Dr. Rajan	Ram Gopal Varma	Hindi	
2003	Jogger's Park	Justice Jyotin Prasad Chatterjee	Anant Balani	Hindi	
2004	Aabar Asbo Phire		Ravi Ojha	Bengali	
2004	Bandhan	Pratap Narayan Chowdhury	Rabi Kinnagi	Bengali	
2004	Bow Barracks Forever	Peter the Cheater	Anjan Dutt	English, Hindi, Bengali	
2005	Parinam		Tanmoy Mukhopadhyay	Bengali	
2005	My Brother... Nikhil	Navin Kapoor	Onir	Hindi	
2005	It Was Raining That Night	Jai Banerjee	Mahesh Manjrekar	Benglish, English	
2005	Home Delivery		Sujoy Ghosh	Hindi	
2006	Ho Sakta Hai	Mohan's grandfather	Wilson Louis	Hindi	
2006	Bradford Riots	Azad	Neil Biswas	English	
2006	The Bong Connection	Gary	Anjan Dutt	Bengali	
2007	Aloy Phera		Subhash Sen	Bengali	
2007	Ta Ra Rum Pum	Shubho Shekhar Rai Banerjee	Siddharth Anand	Hindi	
2007	Bandhu		Prashanta Nanda	Bengali	
2007	Apne	Ehsaan Ali	Anil Sharma	Hindi	
2007	Chaurahen	Dr. Bose	Rajshree Ojha	English	
2007	Kali Shankar	Grandfather of Kali and shankar	Prashant Nanda	Bengali	
2008	Sarkar Raj	Mike Rajan	Ram Gopal Varma	Hindi	
2008	Tahaan	Tahaan's Grandfather	Santosh Sivan	Hindi	
2009	Chowrasta: Crossroads Of Love		Anjan Dutt	English, Hindi	
2009	Aladin	Aladin's grandfather	Sujoy Ghosh	Hindi	
2009	Aparadhi		Subhash Sen	Bengali	
2010	Gumshuda	Jalaluddin	Ashoke Viswanathan	Hindi	
2010	Bondhu Eso Tumi		Parthasarathi Joarddar	Bengali	
2011	Meherjaan	Khwaja Saheb	Rubaiyat Hossain	Bengali	
2011	Punorutthan		Rishi Mukherjee	Bengali	
2011	Gosain Baganer Bhoot	Ram Kabiraj	Nitish Roy	Bengali	
2012	Jaal		Amit Samanta	Bengali	
2012	Om Shanti		Satabdi Roy	Bengali	
2012	Delhi In A Day	Dhanbir	Prashant Nair	English, Hindi	
2012	Ekhon Nedekha Nodir Xhipare	Grandfather of Sudakshina	Bidyut Kotoky	Assamese	
2012	Tor Naam	Swapna's father	Satabdi Das	Bengali	
2013	Shabdo	Dr Sen	Kaushik Ganguly	Bengali	
2013	Kagojer Nouka	Raman	Parthasarathi Joarder	Bengali	
2013	Shantiniketaney		Ashok Biswanathan	Bengali	
2014	Amavas		Sidharth Srinivasan	Hindi	
2014	Gunday	SP Avijit Dutt	Ali Abbas Zafar	Bengali, Hindi	
2014	Children Of War	Baba	Mrityunjay Devvrat	Hindi	
2014	Jeeya Jurir Xubax	Dhon	Sanjib Sabhapandit	Assamese	
2014	It Was Raining That Night	Jai Banerjee	Mahesh Manjrekar	Bengali, English	
2015	Unfreedom	Fareed Rahmani	Raj Amit Kumar	English	
2016	Tui Je Amaar		Prodyut Bhattacharya	Bengali	
2016	Fever	Dr. David Roy	Rajeev Jhaveri	Hindi	
2016	Land of the Gods	Rahul Negi	Goran Paskaljević	Hindi, English	
2016	Love Express	Shibo Prasad Ganguly	Rajiv Kumar Biswas	Bengali	
2017	Biporjoy		Sourav Chakraborty	Bengali	
2017	Golmaal		Narayan Roy	Bengali	
2017	The House Next Door		Milind Rau	Hindi, Tamil	
2018	Alifa		Deep Choudhury	Bengali	
2018	The Answer	Paramahansa Yogananda	Pavan Kaul	English	
2018	Ami Sudhu Tor Holam		Subrata Halder	Bengali	
2018	High Life	Indian Professor	Claire Denis	English	
2018	Xhoixobote Dhemalite		Bidyut Kotoky	Assamese	
2019	Josef: Born in Grace	Father O' Hara	Susant Misra	Hindi	
2019	E. M. Forster: His Longest Journey	Self (archive footage)	Vance Goodwin	English	
2022	Thinking of Him	Gurudev Rabindranath Tagore	Pablo Cesar	English	Indo- Argentinian film
2022	Master Moshai		Abhijit Sen	Bengali	
2022	Sannyasi Deshonayok	Subhas Chandra Bose	Amlan Kusum Ghosh	Bengali	
2022	Josef - Born in Grace	Father O'Hara	Susant Misra	Hindi	
2022	Tryst with Destiny		Prashant Nair	Hindi	
2023	Akorik		Tathagata Bhattacherjee	Bengali	
2023	Raktabeej	Animesh Chatterjee	Nandita-Shiboprosad	Bengali	
2024	City of Small Blessings	Prakesh	Chen‐Hsi Wong	English	Singaporean film
2025	5th September		Kunal Shamshere Malla	Hindi	
2025	Raktabeej 2	Animesh Chatterjee	Nandita-Shiboprosad	Bengali	
2025	Roi Roi Binale	Victor Sir	Rajesh Bhuyan	Assamese	

== Series ==
Year	Title	Role	Language	Network/TV	Note
2021	Tryst with Destiny	Mr. Ashwa	Hindi	SonyLIV	
