= Ashish Vidyarthi filmography =

Ashish Vidyarthi is an Indian actor who predominantly works in Hindi, Telugu, Tamil, Bengali, Kannada, Malayalam, English, Marathi, and Odia films. He is noted for his antagonist and character roles. During his career he has acted in over 300 films in 11 different languages.

== Filmography ==
=== Hindi ===
Year	Title	Role	Notes
1993	Sardar	V. P. Menon	
1994	Drohkaal	Commander Bhadra	
1994	1942: A Love Story	Ashutosh	
1995	Oh Darling! Yeh Hai India!		
1995	Baazi	Shiva	
1995	Naajayaz	Ratan	
1996	Jeet	Inspector Pratap Bidyarthi	
1996	Is Raat Ki Subah Nahin	Ramanbhai	
1997	Vishwavidhaata	Rai Bahadur	
1997	Kaal Sandhya		
1997	Bhai	David	
1997	Mrityudaata	Mohanlal	
1997	Daud: Fun on the Run	Inspector Nair	
1997	Koi Kisise Kum Nahin	Ashok	
1997	Ziddi	ACP Inder Saxena	
1998	Major Saab	Shankar	
1998	Soldier	Dinesh Kapoor	
1998	Yamraaj	Raja Bhaiya	
1999	Haseena Maan Jaayegi	Bhai	
1999	Arjun Pandit	Haldiram	
1999	Lohpurush	Inspector Salim Hindustani	
1999	Benaam	Damak	
1999	Trishakti	Rajeshwar Raja	
1999	Jaanwar	Inspector Arjun Pradhan	
1999	Vaastav: The Reality	Vitthal Kaanya	
2000	Badal	Jeet Ram	
2000	Kaho Naa... Pyaar Hai	Inspector Satish Shinde	
2000	Bichhoo	Devraj Khatri	
2000	Gaja Gamini	Scientist	
2000	Joru Ka Ghulam	Pappu Anna	
2000	Refugee	Makkad	
2001	Ek Rishtaa: The Bond of Love	Hari Singh	
2001	Jodi No.1	Sir John	
2001	Kyo Kii... Main Jhuth Nahin Bolta	Kalra Bhai	
2002	Ab Ke Baras	Rudra Singh	
2002	Chor Machaaye Shor	Tito	
2002	Hum Kisise Kum Nahin	Pillai	
2002	Kya Yehi Pyaar Hai	Raj Patil (Raja)	
2002	Shararat	Arora	
2002	Waah! Tera Kya Kehna	Charles	
2002	Zindagi Khoobsoorat Hai	Gul Baloch	
2003	Ek Aur Ek Gyarah	Cobra	
2003	LOC: Kargil	Col. Ravindran, 2 Rajputana Rifles	
2003	Border Hindustan Ka	Major Ansari	
2003	Fun2shh... Dudes in the 10th Century	Ghoshal	
2003	Jaal: The Trap	Naved Rabhani	
2003	Love at Times Square	Hashmi 'Bullet'	
2003	Talaash: The Hunt Begins...	Police Commissioner	
2004	Kismat	Vikas Patil	
2004	Shikaar	Kanwar Singh	
2004	Agnipankh	Pakistani Army Commander	
2004	AK-47	Dadua	
2005	Jurm	Police Inspector	
2005	Eashwar Mime Co.	Eashwar	
2006	Mere Jeevan Saathi	Torani	
2007	Awarapan	Rajan D. Malik	
2008	Mr. Black Mr. White	Don Ladla	
2008	Jimmy		
2009	Lahore	Mohd. Akhtar	
2009	Red Alert: The War Within	Velu	
2009	Kisse Pyaar Karoon	Police Inspector	
2010	Khuda Kasam	Home Minister	
2010	Rakta Charitra	Mandha	
2012	Barfi!	Mr. Chatterjee	
2013	R... Rajkumar	Manik Parmar	
2014	Haider	Brigadier T. S. Murthy	
2014	Rang Rasiya	Raja Thirumal	
2015	Rahasya	Sachin Mahajan	
2015	Once Upon a Time in Bihar	Madan Sharma	
2016	Aligarh	Advocate Anand Grover	
2016	Bollywood Diaries	Vishnu	
2017	Begum Jaan	Harsh	
2017	Bachche Kachche Sachche	Munna	
2019	The Lion King	Scar	Voiceover
2021	Helmet	Jogi	
2022	Kaun Pravin Tambe?	Coach Vidyadhar Paradkar	
2022	GoodBye	P.P. Singh	
2023	Kuttey	Harry	
2023	Khufiya	Jeev Bonda	
2023	Tejas	IAF chief R K Panicker	
2024	Kill	Beni	
2026	Prahaar: The Untold Story of Ujjwal Nikam	Justice M.L.Tahiliyani	

=== Telugu ===
Year	Title	Role	Notes
1998	Pape Naa Pranam	Assassin	
1999	AK-47	Dawood	
2002	Sreeram	Encounter Shankar	
2004	Gudumba Shankar	Kumaraswamy	
2004	Vijayendra Varma	Nanaji	
2005	Athanokkade	Anna	
2005	Narasimhudu	Police Commissioner	
2006	Annavaram	Tapas Balu	
2006	Raraju	Kotireddy Venkat Reddy	
2006	Brahmastram	Rudra	
2006	Pokiri	Sub-inspector Pasupathy	
2007	Chirutha	Mattu Bhai	
2007	Athidhi	Danny Bhai	
2007	Tulasi	Veeranna	
2007	Lakshyam	DIG Ajay Prakash	
2008	Konchem Koththaga		
2008	Kantri	Seshu	
2008	Ontari	Lal Mahankali	
2009	Ganesh Just Ganesh	Mahadevan	
2010	Varudu	Raj Gopal	
2010	Adhurs	Dhanraj	
2011	Ala Modalaindi	John Abraham	
2011	Chattam	Shivaji	
2011	Madatha Kaja	Nanda	
2012	Genius	Peddapuram Peda Babu	
2013	Naayak	CBI Officer	
2013	Baadshah	Crazy Robert	
2013	Minugurulu	Father	
2013	Kevvu Keka	Gottam Gopalakrishna	
2013	Bhai	David	
2013	Chandee	Minister	
2013	Greeku Veerudu	P. R.	
2013	Kamina	Teja	
2014	Autonagar Surya		
2014	Aagadu	SP Mallikarjun	
2015	Gopala Gopala	Shankar Narayana	
2015	Jadoogadu		
2015	Where Is Vidya Balan	Police Inspector	
2015	Kick 2	Settlement Durga	
2015	Sher	Chhota	
2015	James Bond	Don	
2016	Nannaku Prematho	Kapil Sinha / Satpal Singh	
2016	Janatha Garage	Raghava's business partner	
2017	Radha	Home Minister	
2017	Oxygen	CBI Officer	
2017	Andhhagadu	Dr. Ashish	
2018	Inttelligent	Venkateswara Rao	
2018	Pantham	Defence Lawyer	
2019	iSmart Shankar	Ramamoorthy	
2023	Writer Padmabhushan	Madhusudhan Rao	
2026	Raakaasa	Ramesh	

=== Tamil ===
Year	Title	Role	Notes
2001	Dhill	DSP Shankar	
2002	Thamizh	Periyavar	
2002	Thamizhan	GK	
2002	Ezhumalai	Nagalingam	
2002	Baba	'Ippo'	
2002	Bagavathi	Easwarapandiyan	
2003	Ramachandra	"Sodukku" Chockalingam	
2003	Dum	Thilak	
2004	Ghilli	Sivasubramanian	
2004	Aai	SP Eashwarapandian	
2004	Jananam	Muthukaruppan	
2005	Aaru	Naadhan	
2006	E	Dr. Ramakrishnan	
2006	Madhu	Siluvai	
2007	Azhagiya Tamil Magan	Anand Chelliah	
2007	Malaikottai	Chittappa Kanthaswamy	
2007	Manikanda	Balasingam	
2008	Dhanam	Nambiar	
2008	Ellam Avan Seyal	Anbukkarasu	
2008	Kuruvi	Konda Reddy	
2008	Theekuchi	Pasupathy Pandian	
2008	Bheemaa	Commissioner	
2009	Adada Enna Azhagu	Alexander	
2009	Solla Solla Inikkum	Madhiyazhagan	
2009	Kanthaswamy	Pallur Paramajothi Ponnusamy (PPP)	
2010	Uthamaputhiran	Periyamuthu Gounder	
2010	Vallakottai	Nachiyar	
2011	Mappillai	Devaraj	
2011	Kandaen	Narmadha's Father	
2011	Udhayan	Ayyanaar	
2012	Thiruthani		
2014	Amara	Sethupathi	
2014	Meaghamann	Sharma	
2015	Yennai Arindhaal	Golden Raj	
2015	Anegan	Commissioner Gopinath and Rana	Dual role
2015	En Vazhi Thani Vazhi		
2023	Echo	Edward	
2023	Iraivan	Hari K. Vedantam	
2026	Sardar 2	Bommai	

=== Bengali ===
Year	Title	Role	Notes
2003	Bombaiyer Bombete	Mr. Gore	
2006	Kranti	Vishnu	
2007	Greptar	Balaram Ghosh	
2007	Kalishankar	Debu Soren	
2008	Satyameba Jayate		
2008	Neel Rajar Deshe		
2011	Fighter	DIG	
2011	Gosainbaganer Bhoot	Habu Sardar	
2012	Khokababu	Ballu	
2012	Awara	Indrajit	
2012	Challenge 2	Guru Nayak	
2013	Nirbhoya		
2014	Bachchan	Inspector	
2014	Teenkahon	Joydeb Guha	
2015	Besh Korechi Prem Korechi	Dibakar	
2015	Agnee 2	Python	Indo-Bangladesh joint production film
2015	Black	Biru Pande	
2016	Angaar	Swapan Sarkar	Indo-Bangladesh joint production film
2016	Hero 420	Rai / Riya's father	Indo-Bangladesh joint production film
2016	Rokto	Villain	Indo-Bangladesh joint production film
2018	Jole Jongole	Police Officer	
2018	Chalbaaz	Dada	
2018	Captain Khan	Abdur Rahman	Bangladeshi film

=== Kannada ===
Year	Title	Role	Notes
1999	AK-47	Dawood	
2001	Vande Matharam	Major Sujan	
2001	Kotigobba	Mark Anthony	
2002	Nandhi	Different Dyani alias Dhanraj	
2004	Durgi	Police Commissioner	
2005	Aakash	Nandini's fiancé	
2005	Nammanna		
2006	Thandege Thakka Maga	Dharmanna	
2006	Suntaragaali	Kalinga	
2007	Aa Dinagalu	M. P. Jayaraj	
2008	Citizen	Simhadri	
2008	Janumada Gelathi		
2008	Paramesha Panwala		
2009	Yodha	Patil	
2010	Porki	Ali Bhai	
2010	Jothegara	ACP Veerabhadra	
2012	Shakti	Police Officer	
2013	Bachchan	Mahesh Deshpande	
2015	Siddhartha	Yeshwanath	
2017	Pataki	Rudrapratap	
2017	March 22	Muslim Maullah	
2026	Balaramana Dinagalu	Jayaram	

=== Malayalam ===
Year	Title	Role	Notes
2003	CID Moosa	Commissioner Gowri Shankar	
2006	Chess	SP Swaminathan	
2007	Black Cat	Prabhul Kumar	
2007	Rakshakan	CI Sugathan	
2009	I G Inspector General	Scaria Zachariah	
2009	Daddy Cool	Bheem Bhai	
2010	Black Stallion	Irumban John	
2012	Bachelor Party	Chettiyar	
2024	Aavesham	College executive Director	

=== Other language films ===
Year	Title	Role	Language	Notes
2000	Nightfall	Kopton	English	American film
2007	Kalishankar	Debu Soren	Odia	
2011	Dam 999	Durai	English	
2014	Punha Gondhal Punha Mujra	Himself	Marathi	
2014	Avatarachi Goshta	Himself	Marathi	Cameo

=== Television ===
Year	Title	Role	Language	Notes
1995	Dastaan	Lankesh		
2016	24 (Season 2)	Roshan Sherchan		
2019	M.O.M. - Mission Over Mars	K. Murlidharan	Web series	
2020	Criminal Justice: Behind Closed Doors	Dipen Prabhu, Public Prosecutar	Web series	
2021	Sunflower	Dilip Iyer	Web series	
2021	Tryst with Destiny	Mr. Mudira	Web series	
2022	Raktanchal	Ramanand Rai	Season 2	
2022	Rudra: The Edge Of Darkness	Jt. CP Raman Acharya		
2022	Aar Ya Paar	Business tycoon		
2022	TVF Pitchers	Kishen Charan Desai	Season 2	
2022	Half Pants Full Pants	Railway guard Subbarao		
2023	Rana Naidu	Raj Naidu	Hindi, Telugu	
2023	Trial By Fire	Neeraj Suri	Hindi	
2023	Slow Rivers	Guru Margadarishi	English	
2024	Ranneeti: Balakot & Beyond	Madhusudan Dutta	Hindi	
2025	The Traitors	Contestant	Hindi	11th place
2026	Bandwaale	David	Hindi	
