= Anjali Patil =

Indian actress

- Born: Nashik, Maharashtra, India
- Occupation: Actress
- Years active: 2011–present

Anjali Patil is an Indian actress who works in Hindi, Marathi, Telugu and Tamil film productions. She has received several awards including a National Film Award and a Filmfare Marathi Award. She received the IFFI Best Actor Award (Female) Silver Peacock Award at the 43rd International Film Festival of India her role in the Sri Lankan film With You, Without You.

She earned rave reviews for her work in Delhi in a Day, Chakravyuh, Newton and With You, Without You. In 2013, she starred in the Telugu film Naa Bangaaru Talli for which she received the National Film Award – Special Mention, and the state Nandi Award for Best Actress.

She won Best Female Debut for her Marathi film The Silence.

== Early life and education ==
Patil was born into a Marathi family and raised in Nashik, Maharashtra, India. Patil completed her higher school in Nashik. By age 14, she had decided to pursue performance art as her career. She persuaded her parents to send her to the Center for Performing Arts at University of Pune. In June 2007, she earned a bachelor's degree in arts with a gold medal for her excellence. Later that year, Patil was chosen to pursue Masters in Theater Design at National School of Drama in New Delhi. It presented her with many opportunities to work extensively with Indian and International film and theater actors and directors.

== Career ==
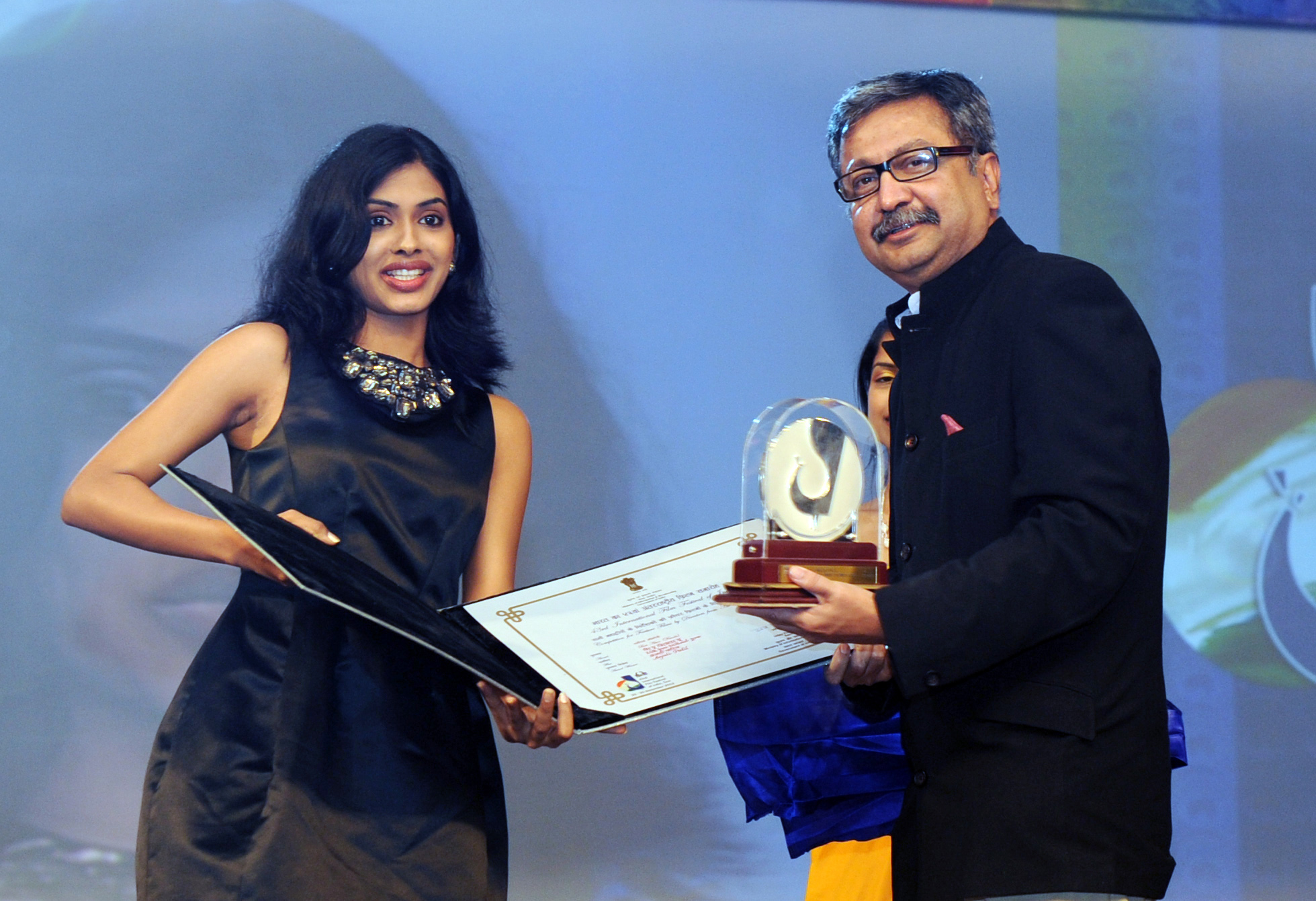
Patil receiving IFFI Best Female Actor award, 2012

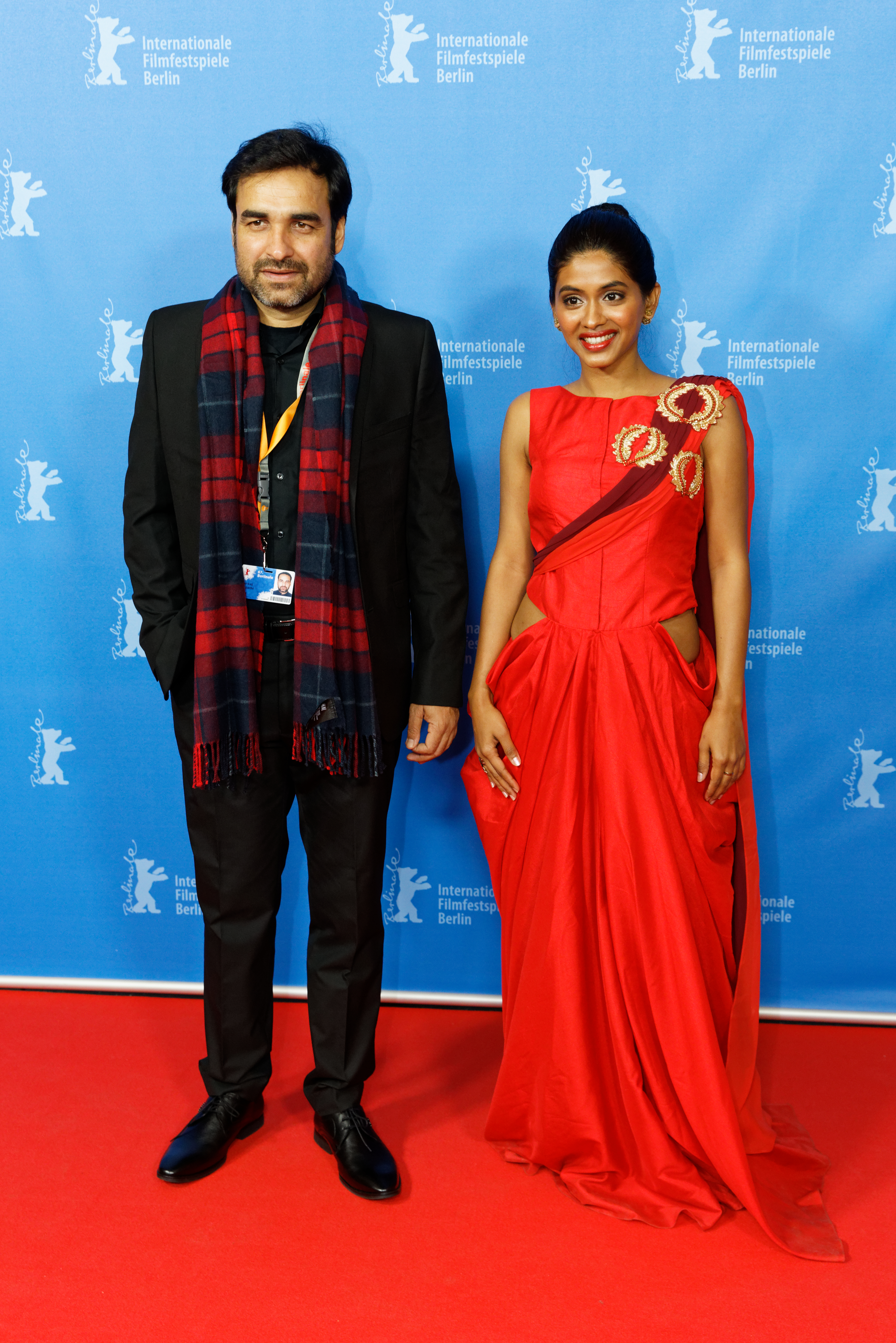
Patil with Pankaj Tripathi at World Premiere Newton Zoopalast Berlinale 2017

Patil's first feature film opportunity came with Prashant Nair's Hindi-English international independent film Delhi in a Day. She was critically acclaimed for her portrayal of Rohini. The film premiered in Asia at the Mumbai film festival on 13 October 2011 and was released theatrically in India in August 2012.

In 2010–11, Patil worked as the lead actress and a producer on an international short film Green Bangles. It was selected as India's official entry to WIFTI (Women In Film and Television International, Los Angeles) and was eventually selected and screened at the WIFTI International Showcase 2012 in 44 cities in 15 countries.

She later worked in Prakash Jha's film on issues related to Naxalism: Chakravyuh. Patil received rave reviews for her fierce portrayal of Naxal leader Juhi.

Oba Nathuwa Oba Ekka (With You, Without You) (2012) was her international collaboration with acclaimed Sri Lankan writer-director Prasanna Vithanage. Patil did the dubbing herself and that makes her the first Indian actress to dub in the Sinhala language. Her stellar performance won her Silver Peacock award for Best Actor Female at International Film Festival of India in Goa in November 2012. She is one of the youngest actors to receive this award. Patil also received the Presidential award Of Sri Lanka for her performance in 2017.

In 2016 Patil did her first Marathi film The Silence with Nagraj Manjule as a co-actor, for which she received a Filmfare award.

She played a pivotal role in Mirzya from Rakeysh Omprakash Mehra which was released in 2016. She went on to collaborate with him as the lead in Mere Pyare Prime Minister in 2018.

Patil's performance as Gondi speaking Malko- Adivasi BLO in Newton, with Rajkumar Rao in 2017 was highly applauded across all levels.

She played a bold and fierce activist, Puyal in Pa. Ranjith's Kaala with Rajinikanth earning a major following in Tamil industry. Her next Tamil venture was Kuthiraivaal which was screened at international film festivals.

Patil's latest work is Hutatma a web series based on the Samyukta Maharashtra Samiti. She recently received the prestigious Ma TA Sanmaan- Best actress for her performance in this series. In 2020, her next web series was Amazon Prime Video's Afsos starring Gulshan Devaiah in the lead role.

Anjali has also worked in an ad film for Sintex, which urged people to take a pledge to save rivers.

== Filmography ==
=== Films ===
Year	Film	Role	Language	Notes
2011	Delhi in a Day	Rohini	Hindi	
2011	Green Bangles	Manu	Hindi	Short Film
2012	Prathyayam	Durga	Telugu	
2012	Oba Nathuwa Oba Ekka	Selvi	Sinhala	Sinhala debut
2012	Chakravyuh	Juhi	Hindi	
2013	Ente	Durga	Malayalam	Bilingual film Malayalam debut
2013	Naa Bangaaru Talli	Durga	Telugu	Bilingual film Malayalam debut
2013	Apna Desh	Vasundara	Kannada	
2013	Shree	Sonu	Hindi	
2014	Kill the Rapist?	Mira Shukla	Hindi	
2014	Finding Fanny	Stefanie 'Fanny' Fernandes, Fanny's daughter	English	Special appearance
2015	The Silence	Maami	Marathi	Marathi debut
2015	Mrs Scooter	Ashima	Hindi	
2016	Mirzya	Zeenat	Hindi	
2017	Sameer	Alia Irade	Hindi	
2017	Newton	Malko	Hindi	
2018	Meri Nimmo	Nimmo	Hindi	
2018	Kaala	Puyal Charumathi Gaekwad	Tamil	Tamil debut
2019	Dithee	Tulsa	Marathi	
2019	My Client’s Wife	sindura singh	Hindi	
2019	Mere Pyare Prime Minister	Sargam	Hindi	
2020	Mann Fakiraa	Mahi	Marathi	
2021	Bardo	Ashalata	Marathi	
2022	Kuthiraivaal	Vanga / Irusaayi	Tamil	
2022	Kaun Pravin Tambe?	Vaishali Tambe	Hindi	
2023	Danny Goes Aum		English	
2024	MahaParinirvaan		Marathi	
2024	Soch: A Perception	Priyanka Negi	Hindi	
2024	Malhar	Kesar	Marathi / Hindi	Bilingual film
2026	The Narmada Story	Gulab Singh	Hindi	
2026	Selvi	Selvi	Tamil	Also producer

=== Web series ===
Year	Title	Role	Language	Notes
2019	Hutatma	Vidyut	Marathi	
2020	Afsos	Shloka	Hindi	
2020	My Client's Wife	Sindoora	Hindi	
2024	Zindaginama	Devaki	Hindi	
2026	Akka		Hindi	

== Awards and nominations ==
Year	Awarded Work	Award	Result
2012	With You, Without You	International Film Festival of India in Goa - Best Actress	Won
2012	Chakravyuh	Stardust Awards 2013 - Breakthrough Supporting Performance - Female	Nominated
2012	Chakravyuh	Star Screen Awards for Most Promising Newcomer- Female	Nominated
2012	Delhi in a Day	New York Indian Film Festival for Best Actress.	Nominated
2012	Delhi in a Day	South Asian Film Festival New York - South Asian Rising Star for Best Supporting Actress	Nominated
2013	Naa Bangaaru Talli	Nandi Award - Nandi Award for Best Actress	Won
2013	Naa Bangaaru Talli	National Film Award – Special Mention	Won
2015	The Silence	Filmfare Marathi Award Best Female Debut	Won
2016	With You, Without You	Sarasaviya Awards in Colombo Sri Lanka - Best Actress	Won
2016	With You, Without You	Presidential Film Awards in Colombo Sri Lanka - Best Actress	Won
2024	Veni	International Film Festival of South Asia (IFFSA) Toronto – Best Actor, Short Film	Won
