= Broken Bird =

Broken Bird may refer to:

- "Broken Bird," the 13th episode of the 6th season of NCIS
- Broken Bird, a 2024 horror movie directed by Joanne Mitchell
