= Ivan Sylvester Rodrigues =

Indian actor

Ivan Rodrigues
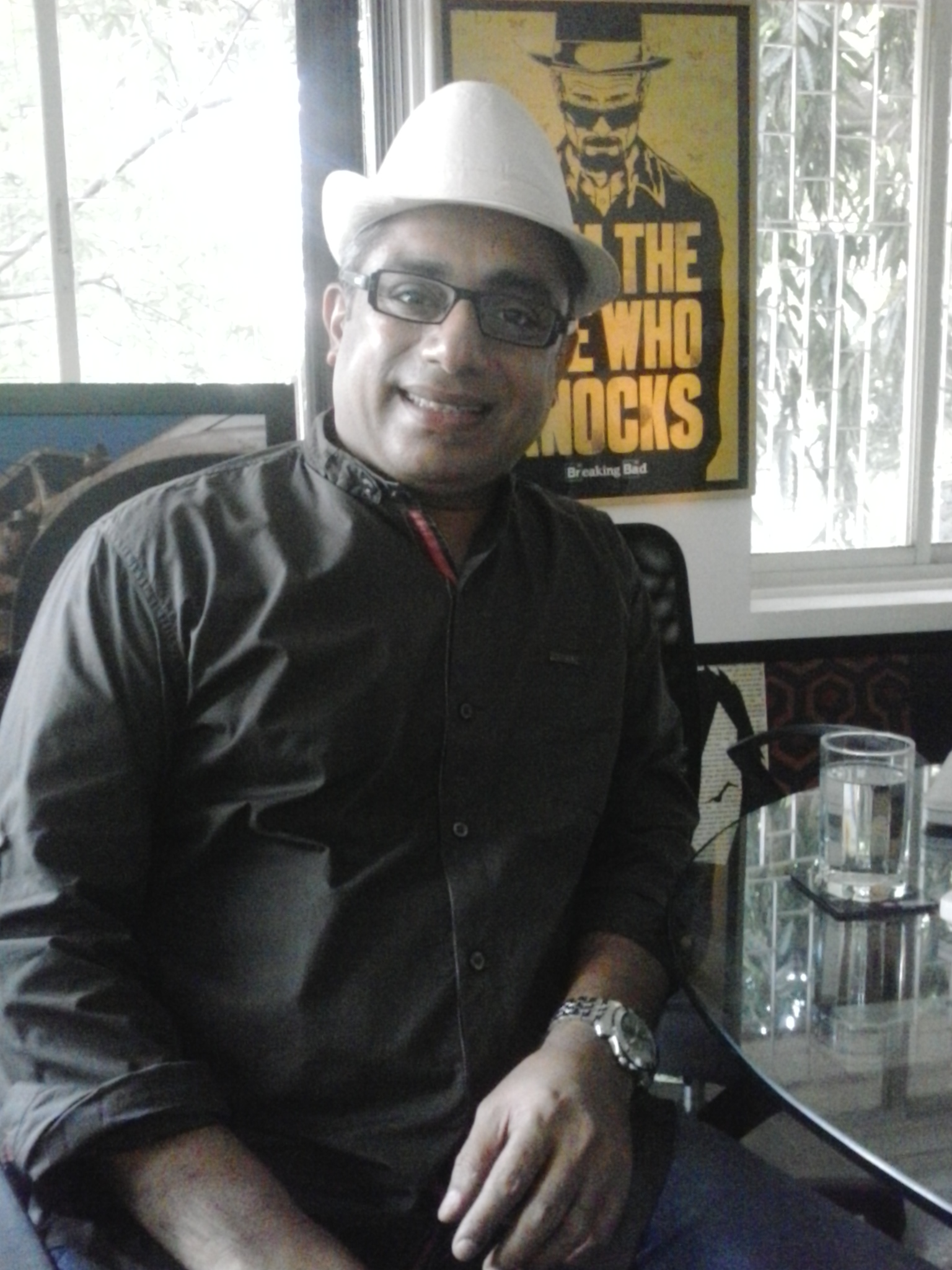
- Image of Ivan Rodrigues
- Born: Ivan Rodrigues; 23 November 1968 (age 57); Mumbai, India
- Occupation: Actor
- Years active: 2011–present
- Spouse: Andrea Rodrigues
- Children: Jeremiah Rodrigues

Ivan Rodrigues (born 23 November 1968) is a film and theatre actor based in Mumbai, Maharashtra, India.

== Early life and education ==
Ivan was born on 23 November 1968 in Mumbai to Robert and Nancy Rodrigues. His parents though were born and brought up in Mangalore, Karnataka, before they moved to Mumbai.

Ivan was involved in school and parish plays. He made his debut in professional theatre with the musical Godspell directed by Joel Furtado and staged by St. Michael's Parish, Mahim. He completed his SSC from St. Michael's High School, Mahim in 1984 standing second in his school.

He graduated in commerce from Sydenham College in 1989 and then did his MBA in Marketing from S.P. Jain in 1991.

After working for 19 years as a senior marketing professional in the corporate world, he quit his job in 2009 to follow his passion for acting full-time.

== Career ==
=== In Theatre ===
It was in his final year in Sydenham College, where he won the awards for Best Play, Best Director and Best Actor for the play The Chairs written by Eugène Ionesco at the prestigious Dr. S. K. Muranjan intra-college competition in 1989. It was at this competition that Mr. Dandavate, who was the then Chairman of the NCPA, invited Ivan to stage The Chairs at the Little Theatre, NCPA. The play received positive reviews in the press at that time.

Since then Ivan has acted in several professional productions and has performed at venues all over India. Some of these include:

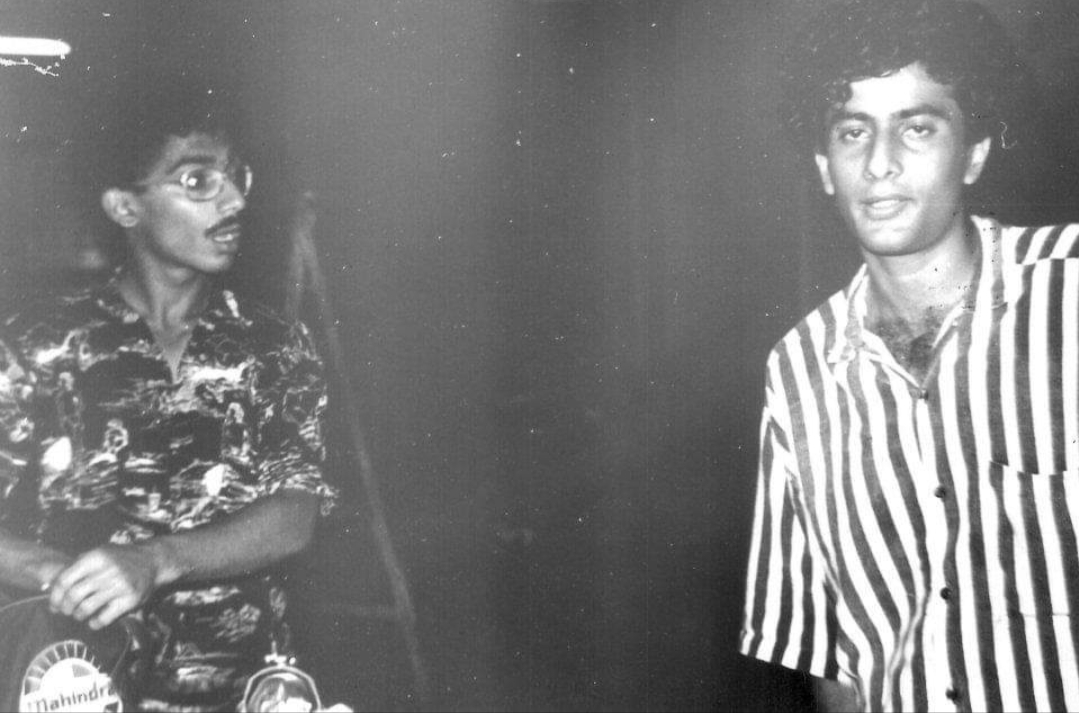
Ivan Rodrigues and Ramu Ramanathan during a rehearsal of 'Krapp's Last Tape'

The Fantasticks, a musical play (music by Harvey Schmidt and lyrics by Tom Jones) directed by Janak Toprani and Nandu Bhende, Krapp's Last Tape (Samuel Beckett) directed by Ramu Ramanathan, In the Matter of J. Robert Oppenheimer (Heinar Kipphardt) directed by Janak Toprani, The Public Eye (Peter Shaffer) directed by Janak Toprani, Final Solutions, written and directed by Mahesh Dattani, Animal Farm (George Orwell), a musical play directed by Arundhati Raja, Holy River (an Indo-British production), directed by Etienne Coutinho and The Big Fat city, written and directed by Mahesh Dattani. He has also written AGP World's The Scent of a Man.

He has also worked with young directors on experimental plays – like Raul Valmiki in The Date(d) and Megha Burman in Do You, I Do.

Over the years, his acting has been much appreciated by audiences and critics alike.

=== In Films ===
Since 2013, he has acted in the following Bollywood films: Satyagraha directed by Prakash Jha, Shamitabh directed by R. Balki, Dil Dhadakne Do directed by Zoya Akhtar, Bharat, Tiger Zinda Hai and Sultan directed by Ali Abbas Zafar, Dear Zindagi directed by Gauri Shinde, Commando 2 directed by Deven Bhojani, MOM directed by Ravi Udyawar, Jagga Jasoos directed by Anurag Basu, Hichki directed by Sidharth P. Malhotra, Love Per Square Foot directed by Anand Tiwari, Bioscopewala directed by Deb Medhekar, Gold directed by Reema Kagti, URI:The Surgical Strike directed by Aditya Dhar, Noblemen directed by Vandana Kataria, Upstarts directed by Udai Singh Pawar, Mumbai Saga directed by Sanjay Gupta, Dial 100 directed by Rensil D'silva and Ek Villain Returns directed by Mohit Suri.

=== In Web Series ===
He has acted in the following TV and web series on Netflix, Amazon Prime, ITV, Alt Balaji, Disney+ Hotstar, ZEE5 Premium, Sony Liv and YouTube: What The Folks S1 directed by Ruchir Arun, The Good Karma Hospital S2 directed by Alex Winckler, Official CEOgiri directed by Samar Sheikh, What's Your Status directed by Madhur Agarwal, The Final Call directed by Vijay Lalwani, Made in Heaven directed by Alankrita Srivastava, Abhay directed by Ken Ghosh, Medically Yourrs directed by Abhijit Das, The Verdict: State vs Nanavati directed by Shashant Shah, Minus One directed by Shubham Yogi, The Family Man directed by Raj Nidhimoru and Krishna D.K., Broken But Beautiful S2 directed by Harsh Dedhia, Brochara directed by Simarpreet Singh, It Happened in Calcutta directed by Ken Ghosh, Kehne Ko Humsafar Hain S3 directed by Abhijit Das, SCAM 1992: The Harshad Mehta Story directed by Hansal Mehta, City of Dreams S2 directed by Nagesh Kukunoor, Tryst Wth Destiny directed by Prashant Nair, Bestseller directed by Mukul Abhyankar and Trial By Fire directed by Prashant Nair.

Over the years, Ivan has gained popularity amongst the youth for featuring in several Filter Copy, Dice Media and Arré web sketches on YouTube.

=== Voice acting ===
Ivan is a professional Voice Over Actor and has lent his voice to several TVCs and Corporate AVs. He has also voiced for the character of Feroze Modi in Amazon audibles Spot Dada directed by Riya Mukherjee and as Mr. Shah in Pitching Pyaar directed by Saad Khan

=== Interviewing ===
Ivan is a professional interviewer and has interviewed many top CXOs and Business Leaders as part of the Economic Times Cutting Chai Stories as also The Brand Story. These interviews are available on YouTube.

=== Hosting ===
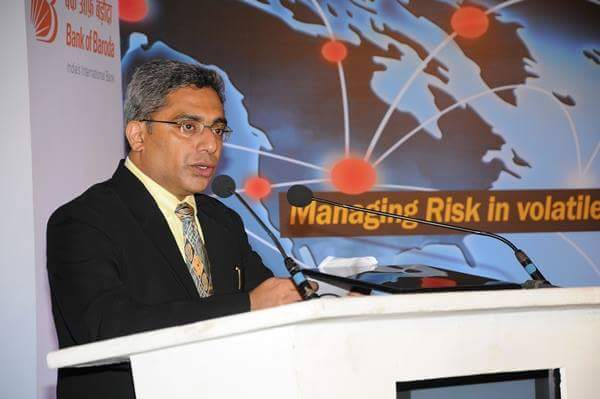
Ivan Rodrigues compering a Dun and Bradstreet event

He has been a compere and MC for corporate events organized by conference producers such as Times Conferences (ET Edge), Dun & Bradstreet, Bloomberg, NRAI, UBM and EC Council.

=== TEDx speaker ===
Ivan delivered his first TED Talk at TEDx MSRIT in Bangalore titled, "You Are Never Too Old To Pursue Your Dreams".

== Filmography ==
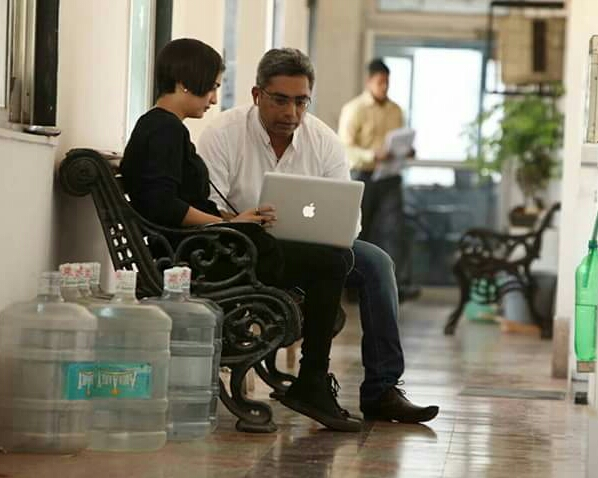
Akshara Hassan and Ivan Rodrigues in Shamitabh

=== Films ===
Year	Title	Role	Notes
2013	Satyagraha	Channel Head	
2015	Shamitabh	Anay Verma	
2015	Kuch Kuch Locha Hai	Mac Mundra	
2015	Dil Dhadakne Do	Dharmapala Sr.	
2016	Sultan	Mr. Patel	
2016	Dear Zindagi	VP Hotel	
2017	Commando 2: The Black Money Trail	Mr. Kamath	
2017	MOM	Principal	
2017	Jagga Jasoos	Mr. Ahuja	
2017	Tiger Zinda Hai	India's Ambassador to Iraq	
2018	Hichki	Principal	
2018	Love Per Square Foot	Noel Misquita	Platform Netflix
2018	Armed	Dr. Murthy	Short Film
2018	Bioscopewala	Airline Spokesperson	
2018	Gold	Sports Official	
2019	Uri: The Surgical Strike	Brian D'souza	
2019	377 Ab Normal	Lawyer Anand Grewal	Platform Zee5
2019	Bharat	Gupta	
2019	Noblemen	Deputy Headmaster	Platform Netflix
2019	Upstarts	Investor 3	Platform Netflix
2020	Unmothered (Short Film)	Ankur	
2021	Mumbai Saga	Journalist Sanjay Kumar Pandey	
2021	Dial 100	Gautam Mehra	Platform Zee5
2021	Dybbuk	Milind Sanghvi	Platform Amazon Prime
2022	Ek Villain Returns	Thapar	
2023	Gumraah	Advocate Bijou	
2024	Crew	Divya's Father	
2026	Ikka	Dr Galvankar	Platform Netflix
2026	Delhi 2021	Dr. D'silva	Zee 5

=== Web series / TV series / Vertical series ===
Year	Title	Role	Notes
2014	Samvidhaan – The Making of the Indian Constitution	P. Subbarayan	
2017	The Big Fat City	Kailash	Hindi Cineplay on Netflix
2017	What The Folks - Season 1	Sunil	
2018	The Good Karma Hospital - Season 2	Davinder Bakshi	English series
2018	Official CEOgiri - Season 2	Vijay Talsania	Platform Arré
2018	What's Your Status	Bharat's Father	
2018	Better Life Foundation - Season 2	Rajiv	
2019	The Final Call	Thakur	Platform Zee5
2019	Made in Heaven - Season 1	Priest	Platform Amazon Prime Video
2019	Abhay - Season 1	Channel Head	Platform Zee5
2019	Medically Yourrs	Dean Dr. Komudhi Banerjee	Platform Alt Balaji
2019	Minus One	Subhash	
2019	The Family Man - Season 1	CEO of INITEK	Platform Amazon Prime Video
2019	The Verdict - State vs Nanavati	Admiral Katari	Platform Alt Balaji
2019	Broken But Beautiful - Season 2	Ahaan's Dad	Platform Alt Balaji and ZEE5
2019	Brochaara - Season 1	Boss	You Tube
2020	It Happened In Calcutta	Dr. Dasgupta	Platform Alt Balaji and ZEE5
2020	Kehne Ko Humsafar Hain - Season 3	Paritosh	Platform Alt Balaji
2020	SCAM 1992 - The Harshad Mehta Story	Fortune India Editor	Platform SonyLIV
2020	Lockdown Rishtey	Doctor	
2020	Lips Don't Lie	Reporter	
2021	City of Dreams - S2	Nambiar	Platform Disney Hotstar
2021	Tryst with Destiny	Galava's Lawyer	SonyLIV
2022	Bestseller	DCP Mehrotra	Amazon Prime
2023	Trial By Fire	Abhishek	Netflix
2025	Culture Vulture	Pai - Boss	You Tube
2026	Dhurandhar Teacher	Principal Ivan Rodrigues	Story TV

=== Amazon Audibles ===
Year	Film	Director	Role
2019	Spot Dada	Riya Mukherjee	Feroz Modi
2022	Pitching Pyar	Saad Khan	Mr. Shah

=== Films / Web series / TV series - Awaiting release / Post production / Shooting for ===
Year	Film	Director	Role
2027	Three Monkeys	Abbas Mustan	Ravindra Jacob
2027	Colour Black	Anand Singh	Ivan
2027	Job Trafficking	Prashant Nair	Fidaris Capital Client

== Plays ==
No.	Title	Playwright	Role	Notes
1	The Chairs	Eugène Ionesco	Actor and Director	
2	Stale News	Badal Sircar	Actor and Director	
3	Krapp's Last Tape	Samuel Beckett	Actor	
4	The Fantasticks	Harvey Schmidt	Actor	
5	Procession	Badal Sircar	Actor	
6	In The Matter Of J. Robert Oppenheimer	Heinar Kipphardt	Actor	
7	The Public Eye	Peter Shaffer	Actor	
8	Holy River	Etienne Coutinho	Actor	
9	Animal Farm (George Orwell)	Arundhati Raja	Actor	
10	The Big Fat City	Mahesh Dattani	Actor	
11	The Scent Of A Man	Ivan Rodrigues (self)	Writer	
12	Date(d)		Actor	
13	Do You, I Do		Actor	
