= Uphaar Cinema fire =

1997 cinema fire in Delhi, India

- Date: 13 June 1997
- Location: Green Park, Delhi, India
- Cause: Electric transformer fire due to improper maintenance, leading to stampede
- Deaths: 59
- Injuries: 103

The Uphaar Cinema fire was a major fire in Green Park, Delhi. The fire started on Friday, 13 June 1997, at Uphaar Cinema (a theatre) during the three o'clock screening of the movie Border. 59 people were trapped inside and died of asphyxiation (suffocation), while 103 were seriously injured in the resulting stampede.

The victims and the families of the deceased later formed The Association of Victims of Uphaar Fire Tragedy (AVUT), which filed the landmark civil compensation case. The suit led to an award of ₹25 crore (equivalent to ₹69 crore or US$7.3 million in 2026) in compensation for the victims' families. The case is now considered a landmark decision in India's civil compensation law. However, on 13 October 2011, a Supreme Court bench headed by Justice R Raveendran, inexplicably, nearly halved the sum of compensation awarded to victims by the [Delhi High Court], and slashed punitive damages to be paid by cinema owners, the Ansal brothers, from ₹2.5 crore (equivalent to ₹5.6 crore or US$600,000 in 2026) to ₹25 lakh (equivalent to ₹56 lakh or US$60,000 in 2026).

In its final order on 25 August 2015, the Supreme Court modified its earlier order and sentenced the Ansal brothers to a two-year jail term if they failed to pay the families of the victims Rs.30 crore each within three months. The Supreme Court reviewed this order again on 9 February 2017, and sentenced Gopal Ansal to a year in jail for the case. The other accused, Sushil Ansal, did not have to serve a further sentence because of his old age.

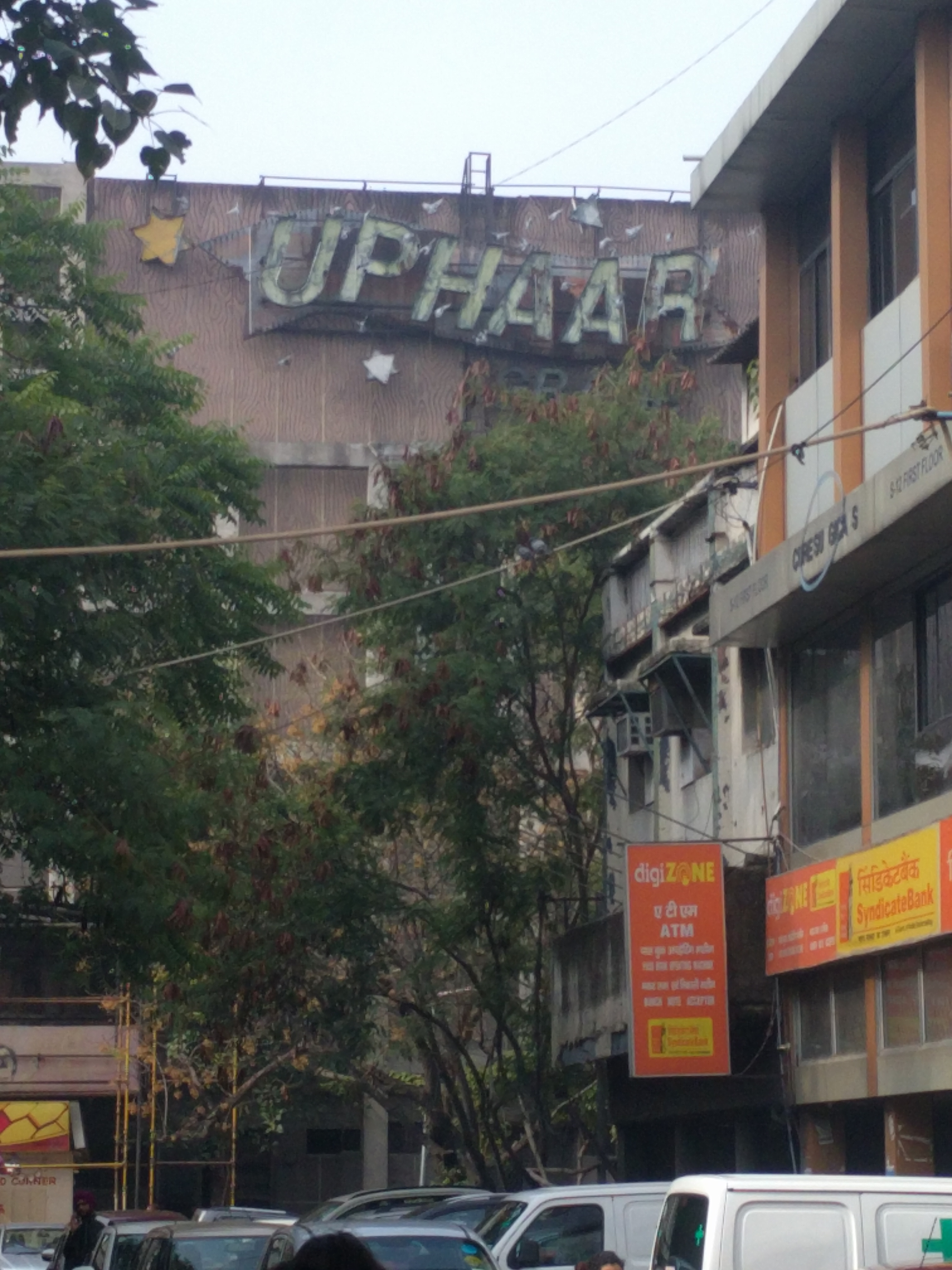
Uphaar Cinema.

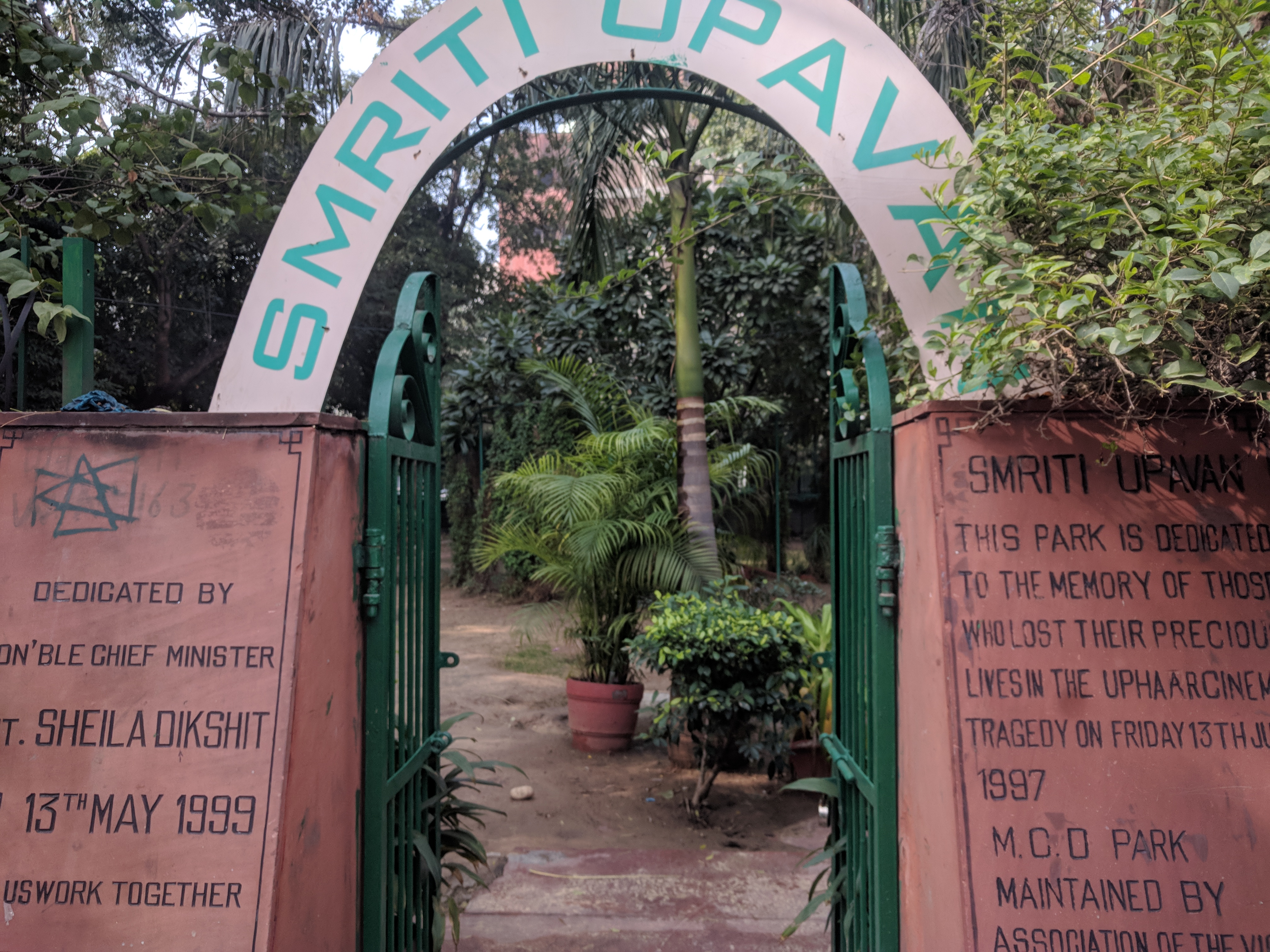
Uphaar fire victim Memorial Park

== Fire ==
On 13 June 1997, at about 6:55 a.m., the larger of the two transformers installed and maintained by DVB on the ground floor of the Uphaar Cinema building caught fire. At around 7 a.m, an explosion was heard by the security guard, Sudhir Kumar, who then discovered smoke in the transformer room. The fire brigade and the Delhi Vidyut Board (DVB) were informed and the fire was brought under control by 7.25 a.m. Inspection of the transformer by the Superintendent of the DVB and his team revealed that three of the low tension cable leads of the transformer had been partially burnt. At around 10:30 a.m., inspectors from DVB and Senior Fitter conducted repairs on the transformer by replacing two aluminum sockets on the B-Phase of the low tension cable leads. The repairs, it appears, were carried out with the help of a die and hammer, and without the use of a crimping machine. DVB completed their repairs between 10:30 a.m. and 11 a.m. The transformer was recharged for the resumption of electric supply by 11:30 a.m. on 13 June 1997.

It is alleged that repairs conducted on the transformer in the earlier part of the day were unsatisfactory and resulted in loose connections that caused sparking on the B-Phase of the transformers. This resulted in the loosening of one of the cables of the transformer, which eventually came off and started dangling loose along with the radiator and burnt a hole in the radiator fin. Through this hole, the transformer oil started leaking out which, on account of the heat generated by the loose cable touching against the radiator, ignited the oil at about 4.55 p.m. on 13 June 1997. Since the transformer did not have an oil soak pit, as required under the regulations and the standard practice, the oil that spread out of the enclosure continued leaking and spreading the fire to the adjacent parking lot where cars were parked at a distance of no more than a metre from the door of the transformer. The result was that all the cars parked in the parking area on the ground floor of the cinema hall were ablaze. Smoke started billowing in the northern and southward directions in the parking lot of the cinema complex. The northern bound smoke encountered a gate, which was adjacent to a staircase leading to the cinema auditorium on the first floor. Due to chimney effect, the smoke gushed into the stairwell and eventually entered the cinema auditorium through a door and through the air conditioning ducts. The southward bound smoke similarly traveled aerially through another staircase and into the lower portion of the balcony of the auditorium from the left side. All this happened while numerous of people were seated in the auditorium enjoying the matinee show of ‘BORDER’, a popular Hindi movie with a patriotic theme.

Because of smoke and carbon monoxide released by the burning oil and other combustible material, the people in the auditorium started suffocating. The Shift In-charge of the Green Park Complaint Centre of DVB received a telephonic message at the relevant point of time, regarding the fire. It was only then that the AIIMS grid to which the transformer in question was connected was switched off and the flow of energy to the cinema complex stopped. According to the prosecution, the supply of the 11 KV outgoing Green Park Feeder tripped off at 5.05 p.m. thereby discontinuing the supply of energy to the cinema. Inside the auditorium and balcony, there was complete pandemonium. The people in the balcony are said to have rushed towards the exits in pitch darkness as there were neither emergency lights nor any cinema staff to help or guide them. No public announcement regarding the fire was made to those inside the auditorium or the balcony, nor were any fire alarms set off, no matter the management and the employees of the Uphaar Cinema were aware of the fact that a fire had broken out. Even the Projector Operator was not given instructions to stop the film while the fire was raging nor was any patron informed about the situation outside. On the contrary, doors to the middle entrance of the balcony were found to be bolted by the gatekeeper who had left his duty without handing over charge to his reliever. More importantly, the addition of a private 8-seater box had completely closed off the exit on the right side of the balcony, while the addition of a total of 52 extra seats over the years had completely blocked the gangway on the right side of the balcony. Similarly, the gangway on the right of the middle entrance was significantly narrower than required under the regulations. All these obstructions, deviations, violations and deficiencies had resulted in the victims getting trapped in the balcony for at least 10–15 minutes exposing them to lethal carbon monoxide, to which as many as 59 people eventually succumbed.

An off-duty Capt. Manjinder Singh Bhinder of the 61st Cavalry of the Indian army and a talented horse-rider, out celebrating his success at a recent national games with his family and a junior officer at the movie hall, gave his and his family's lives up saving over 150 people, on his personal initiative. Rushing out along with his family at first, realising the gravity of the unfolding tragedy, he and his people went back inside and tried to set order and guide people out to safety. Fire services were delayed due to the heavy evening traffic and the location of the cinema hall, situated in one of the busiest areas of South Delhi. At least 48 fire tenders were pressed into service at 5:20 p.m. and it took them over an hour to put out the fire. Later the dead and the injured were rushed to the nearby All India Institute of Medical Sciences (AIIMS) and Safdarjung Hospital, where scenes of chaos and pandemonium followed, as relatives and family members of the victims scurried around to look for known faces.

== Causes and fire violations ==
The enquiries done by the Law commission of India, the Delhi Fire department, the Naresh Kumar committee, the Dy. commissioner of Police and the CBI found a number of fire code violations including the following:

- No functional public announcement system (no announcement was made when the fire broke out)
- No emergency lights, foot lights, exit lights (The cinema hall was in pitch darkness when the fire broke out)
- Blocked gangways (the hall had made unauthorized extensions and additions to seats)
- Blocked exits (many exit doors – including the one leading to the terrace – and gates were locked)
- Unauthorised use of premises (shops were being run from spaces supposed to be empty)
- Installation and maintenance of the DVA transformer (where the fire had started) – in violation of Indian Electricity Rules (no periodic maintenance, no fire extinguishers, no isolation device, haphazard electrical cables)

== The investigation and trial ==
In the beginning a magisterial probe (judicial review) took place which submitted its report on 3 July 1997, wherein it held cinema management, Delhi Vidyut Board, city fire service, the Delhi police's licensing branch and municipal corporation responsible for the incident saying "it contributed to the mishap through their acts of omission and commission", it also blamed the cinema management for losing precious time in alerting the fire services, and also for not maintaining proper distance between the transformer room and the car park. It also said that, "when the fire broke out at 1645 hours, the movie was not stopped nor any announcement made to evacuate the audience. Exit signs were not battery-operated and once the lights went out, panic-struck people had to grope in the dark for exits, many of which were blocked by seats". Subsequently, the courts issued non-bailable warrants against Sushil Ansal, his brother Gopal, a Delhi Vidyut Board inspector and two fire service officials. After evading arrest for many days, Sushil and his son Pranav Ansal, the owners of Ansals Theatres and Club Hotels Limited, which owned the Uphaar cinema were finally arrested in Mumbai on 27 July 1997, and sent to judicial custody, though were later released on bail. Also amongst those arrested was the company's director V K Aggarwal.

Following the inquiry, Union Home ministry transferred the probe to the Central Bureau of Investigation (CBI) amidst charges by victims' families of cover-up, which on 15 November 1997, filed a chargesheet against 16 accused, including theatre owners Sushil and Gopal Ansal, for causing death by negligence, endangering life and relevant provisions of the Cinematography Act, 1952. By 2000, the prosecution had completed the recording of evidence with the testimony of its 115 witnesses. The court case ran for over a decade, and the court had over 344 hearings during the first seven years. Four of the accused died, and eight witnesses, mostly relatives of Ansals turned hostile witness, despite the High court responding to AVUT's plea and asking the trial court in 2002 to expedite the case. Meanwhile, as the criminal trial dragged on, in 2003, a presiding judge commented upon the repeated requests (for adjournment) as being intended to delay the case.

Almost nine years after the tragedy, a trial court judge visited the Uphaar cinema hall in August 2006, accompanied by CBI officials who investigated the case to get a first-hand look at the seating and fire safety arrangements, which have been blamed for the tragedy. The site had been preserved as "material evidence" since the tragedy. The visit followed a High Court order in which the trial court was asked to examine all available evidence in the matter, as the courts proceeding were coming to an end. In its report the court observed that on the second-floor balcony of the theatre, where victims were asphyxiated, "the space provided for exhaust fans on the walls was found blocked with the help of a cardboard".

== Civil compensation case ==
In a connected civil court case, 'The Association of Victims of Uphaar Fire Tragedy' (AVUT) sought civil compensation from Ansal Theatre and Clubhotels Ltd., which owned the theatre, and the Delhi government alleged 'negligence' on their part led to the fire in the cinema hall. The verdict of this case came on 24 April 2003, and the Delhi High Court found owners of the Uphaar cinema, Municipal Corporation of Delhi (MCD), Delhi Vidyut Board (electricity Board) (DVB) and the licensing authority 'guilty of negligence', and awarded Rs 25 crore (Rs 250 million) civil compensation to the relatives of victims, which included Rs 15 lakh each to the relatives of the victims, less than 20 years at the time of the tragedy and a sum of Rs 18 lakh each to those, above 20 years. The compensation included Rs.2.5 crore for development of a trauma centre near New Delhi's Safdarjung Hospital, situated close to the cinema hall. The court directed the cinema owners to pay 55 percent of the compensation since they were the maximum beneficiaries of the profit earned from the cinema, the remaining 45 per cent was to be borne equally by MCD, DVB and licensing authorities, each contributing 15 percent of the amount.

The Supreme Court on 13 October 2011 reduced the amount of compensation to be paid to the victims of 1997 Uphaar Cinema fire tragedy. The compensation to the family of deceased above 20 yrs cut from Rs. 18 lakh to Rs. 10 lakh each; for those below 20 yrs, from Rs. 15 lakh to Rs. 7.5 lakh.

== Evidence tampering case ==
In 2003, the public prosecutor in the case reported that several important documents filed along with the charge sheet were missing from the court record of the case or had been tampered with or mutilated. The court ordered an inquiry and dismissed the court clerk. In 2006, the Economic Offences Wing (EOW) of the Delhi Police registered the case on a Delhi High Court direction on a petition by 'Association of the Victims of Uphaar Tragedy' (AVUT) convener Neelam Krishnamurthy.

In February 2008, on the basis of the charge-sheet filed by the Economic Offences Wing of the Delhi police for allegedly removing, tampering and mutilating important documents of the Uphaar fire tragedy case in conspiracy with a clerk in a trial court there in 2003, the Delhi court summoned Uphaar cinema hall owners Sushil Ansal and Gopal Ansal and four others in the evidence tampering case, under Sections 120-B (criminal conspiracy), 201 (causing disappearance of evidence or giving false information to screen offenders) and 409 (criminal breach of trust) of the Indian Penal Code.

== The verdict ==
The final verdict came four years later on 20 November 2007, and the quantum of sentences were given out on 23 November, in which 12 people, including the two Ansal brothers, were found guilty, and later convicted for of various charges including, causing death by negligent act, and were given the maximum punishment of two years’ rigorous imprisonment. They were also fined Rs.1,000 each for violating Section 14 of the Cinematography Act. The court also directed the CBI to investigate the role of other officials who had been giving temporary licenses to the Uphaar cinema hall for 17 years.

The other seven accused, three former Uphaar cinema managers, the cinema's gatekeeper and three DVB officials, were all given seven years' rigorous imprisonment, under Section 304-A (causing death by negligence) of the Indian Penal Code (IPC), and housed at the Tihar Jail. The court also fined all the 12 accused with Rs.5,000 each, and also sentenced all of them to two years’ rigorous imprisonment, as they were found guilty of endangering the personal safety of others, both the sentences, however, were to run concurrently. Sources:ABP News But in the court session only the staff and the head was punished and not the DVB superintendent and the DVB labourers.

== Post verdict ==
One year after the verdict, one of the managers, who had allegedly fled from the hall soon after the fire broke out and the fire safety measures were not followed, died at a Delhi hospital on 6 December 2008. In December 2008, the High Court, while upholding the trial court order convicting the Ansal brothers, had reduced their sentences of imprisonment from two years to one year. On 30 January 2009, an Apex bench of the Supreme Court granted bail to Sushil Ansal and Gopal Ansal. On 5 March 2014, the Supreme court upheld the conviction of the Ansal brothers. The apex court further stated that Ansals were more concerned about making money than ensuring the safety of cinema-goers. The issue on the quantum of punishment referred to a three-judge bench in view of the difference in opinion between the two judges who delivered the verdict.

On 26 March 2014, Sushil Ansal left India without seeking permission from the Apex Court. The Supreme Court has expressed displeasure over real estate baron Sushil Ansal, convicted in Uphaar fire case, leaving the country without its permission. The apex court, however, allowed Ansal to stay abroad for medical treatment after he gave an assurance that he would return on 11 April.

== Final verdict ==
On 19 August 2015, Supreme court of India imposed a fine on Ansal brothers for ₹ 30 crores each and held that their jail terms will be reduced to the term already undergone by them if they pay the fine, considering their old age. The court ruled that the lack of a trauma center at the nearby AIIMS hospital had contributed to the high death toll in the incident. However this decision has been criticized by the victims families.

In November 2021, the Delhi court sentenced the brothers seven years in jail and fined ₹2.25 crore (US$240,000) each for tampering with the evidence. In July 2022, the Ansal brother’s were again released citing old age. For more details see reference.

== Aftermath ==
The fire exposed the poor safety standards at public places in the country's capital. This was not the first instance of such a fire. On 6 July 1989, a fire had broken out at Uphaar cinema due to a fault in the substation. After an earlier transformer caused fire at Gopal Towers, a high-rise in Rajendra Place, New Delhi in 1983, the licenses of 12 cinemas, including that of Uphaar, had been canceled. The Deputy Commissioner of Police (Licensing) who inspected Uphaar, had listed ten serious violations, however, all remained uncorrected until the fire 14 years later.

== In popular culture ==
The 2023 Hindi language Netflix Series Trial By Fire by Prashant Nair starring Rajshri Deshpande, Abhay Deol, Rajesh Tailang, Ashish Vidyarthi, Anupam Kher, Ratna Pathak, Shilpa Shukla, and Shardul Bharadwaj, is based on the Uphaar cinemas fire and tells the story of a couple who lost their two children in the Uphaar fire theater. The series centered on their trials and tribulations as they struggled to find justice over 20 years later. The story portrayed the aftermath of the fire and the effect the incident had on the victims’ families.
