= Mere Pyare Prime Minister =

2018 Indian film directed by Rakeysh Omprakash Mehra

- Theatrical release poster
- Directed by: Rakeysh Omprakash Mehra
- Written by: Manoj Mairta; Rakeysh Omprakash Mehra; Hussain Dalal
- Produced by: Rakeysh Omprakash Mehra; P.S. Bharathi; Navmeet Singh; Rajiv Tandon; Arpit Vyas
- Starring: Anjali Patil; Om Kanojiya; Atul Kulkarni; Makrand Deshpande
- Cinematography: Pawel Dyllus
- Edited by: Meghna Manchanda Sen
- Music by: Shankar–Ehsaan–Loy
- Production companies: ROMP Pictures; Aham Brahmasmi Entertainment; PVR Cinemas
- Distributed by: Pen Studios
- Release dates: 23 October 2018 (Rome Film Festival); 15 March 2019
- Running time: 104 minutes
- Country: India
- Language: Hindi
- Box office: est. ₹03.9 million

Mere Pyare Prime Minister (transl. My Dear Prime Minister) is a 2018 Indian Hindi-language social-drama film directed by Rakeysh Omprakash Mehra. It stars Anjali Patil, Om Kanojiya, Atul Kulkarni, Makrand Deshpande, Niteesh Wadhwa and Rasika Agashe. The film follows an eight-year-old boy who decides to write a letter to the Prime Minister of India after his mother is raped. The film brings into focus the issues of defecation in open and sanitation problems faced in slums. It was the only Asian film which was screened at the Rome Film Festival. The film was released on 15 March 2019 in theatres.

== Plot ==
The story revolves around the film's eight-year-old protagonist, Kannu (Kanojia), who lives in a slum and dreams of building a toilet for his mother. After his mother Sargam (Patil) is raped when she goes out in the night to defecate in the open, Kannu takes charge of improving the conditions in the slum.

In his quest to build a toilet, Kannu writes a letter to the prime minister and travels to New Delhi from Mumbai with his comrades Ringtone (Bharti) and Nirala (Prasad). The fourth member of their gang Mangla (Syna Anand) is providing support to the family back in Mumbai. After they give their letter to the office in Delhi, they return to Mumbai where Sargam is very worried for Kannu. When defecating near the pipes, Kannu mistakenly falls in the water and his friend, Ringtone jumps in to save him. Sargam comes to find Kannnu and Ringtone unharmed. The Toilet is eventually built but a public toilet not a private one but Kannu is still grateful that it was at least built. The slum residents all come to celebrate the toilet being built and inaugurate it.

== Cast ==
- Om Kanojiya as Kanhaiya 'Kanhu' 'Kanna'
- Anjali Patil as Sargam
- Atul Kulkarni as Prime minister's official
- Makarand Deshpande as Sainath Adgale
- Rasika Agashe as Rabiya
- Sonia Albizuri as Eva Patten
- Syna Anand as Mangla
- Adarsh Bharti as Ringtone
- Prasad as Nirala
- Nachiket Purnapatre as Sajju
- Niteesh Wadhwa as Pappu Pandey
- Jigyasa Yaduwanshi as Lady Cop

== Production ==
=== Development ===
The director of the film, Rakeysh Omprakash Mehra has made films on stories based on Delhi. This time he based the story of his film, Mere Pyare Prime Minister, on the life of people in slums of Mumbai. Mehra said, "The subject has been simmering on a slow fire for three years. I'm a Delhi boy and all my films – Rang De Basanti, Delhi 6, Bhaag Milkha Bhaag and Mirzya – were all set in the North. But I've been living in Mumbai since 1988 and seen it transform into a world city. The buildings are taller now but there are still slums around them that have always intrigued me and made me follow the path of Salaam Bombay, Slumdog Millionaire and other stories which have grown out of them." He noted the film was not so much about comparisons as a story of people and relationships.

=== Casting ===
National award-winning actress Anjali Patil was selected to play mother of the child protagonist around whom the film revolves. Three kids living in the slums were selected to play role of his friends.

=== Filming ===
The principal photography began in May 2017.

== Soundtrack ==
Mere Pyare Prime Minister

Soundtrack album by Shankar–Ehsaan–Loy
- Released: 14 March 2019
- Recorded: 2017–18
- Genre: Feature Film Soundtrack
- Length: 18:18
- Language: Hindi
- Label: Sony Music India; Saregama Music (Baja Baja Dhol Baja)

Shankar–Ehsaan–Loy chronology
Manikarnika: The Queen of Jhansi (2019)	Mere Pyare Prime Minister (2019)	Saaho (2019)

The film's music is composed by Shankar–Ehsaan–Loy and lyrics written by Gulzar.

Track listing
No.	Title	Singer(s)	Length
1.	"Mere Pyare Prime Minister – Title Track"	Arijit Singh	3:42
2.	"Rezgaariyaan"	Shivam Mahadevan, Shankar Mahadevan	4:11
3.	"Kanha Re"	Rekha Bhardwaj	5:00
4.	"Bajaa Bajaa Dhol Bajaa"	Shankar Mahadevan, Divya Kumar, Asha Bhosle, Rekha Bhardwaj, Shrinidhi Ghatate, Neela Mulhekar	5:25
Total length:			18:18

== Release ==
The film was released in India on 15 March 2019.

=== Home media ===
The film became available as VOD on Netflix on 30 May 2019.

== Reception ==
=== Critical review ===
Rajen Sen of Hindustan Times gave Mere Pyare Prime Minister three stars out of five, calling it 'an earnest fairy-tale, modest but far from memorable'.
