= The Debt (2003 film) =

British television crime drama film directed by Jon Jones

- DVD cover
- Genre: Crime drama
- Written by: Richard McBrien
- Directed by: Jon Jones
- Starring: Warren Clarke; Hugo Speer; Lee Williams; Orla Brady; Martin Freeman; Nina Sosanya; Malcolm Storry; Barbara Marten; Amanda Abbington
- Theme music composer: Martin Phipps
- Country of origin: United Kingdom

Production
- Executive producers: Sally Haynes; Laura Mackie; Jim Reeve
- Producer: Pier Wilkie
- Cinematography: John Pardue
- Editor: Nick Arthurs
- Running time: 55 minutes (per part)
- Production company: Strand Productions

Original release
- Network: BBC One
- Release: 31 August – 1 September 2003

The Debt is a two-part British television crime drama film, written by Richard McBrien and directed by Jon Jones, that first broadcast on BBC One on 31 August 2003. The film stars Warren Clarke as Geoff Dresner, a retired safe-cracker determined to leave his criminal past behind, who is persuaded to come out of retirement to do one last job to clear the debt of his son-in-law, Terry (played by Martin Freeman), owed to a notorious loan-shark. However, things go badly wrong when a security guard dies as a result of their plan. Hugo Speer, Lee Williams, Orla Brady and Nina Sosanya are also credited as principal members of the cast.

Writer Richard McBrien said of the production; "The Debt is a story about a criminal, a detective and a lawyer and how their lives collide with each other. The idea is that all three men owe debts to their children in some way which affects the way they do their job." The first part drew 5.08 million viewers, while the second part drew 4.48 million. The film holds a 71% rating on Rotten Tomatoes. The Debt was released on Region 1 DVD on 7 November 2006.

== Cast ==
- Warren Clarke as Geoff Dresner
- Hugo Speer as DS Edward 'Ed' Foster
- Lee Williams as James Hilden
- Orla Brady as Angela Jahnsen
- Martin Freeman as Terry Ross
- Nina Sosanya as DI Kate Jaspers
- Malcolm Storry as Tony Stokes
- Barbara Marten as Gwen Dresner
- Amanda Abbington as Stacey Ross
- Jodi Albert as Sophie Stokes
- Doug Rao as Jez Kinnion
- Sharlene Whyte as Leona Tilding
- Roger Alborough as Chief Supt. Baxter
- Ben Alsford as Charlie Foster
- Harri Earthy as Gillian Hilden
- Brandon Miller as Andy Ross
- Rosalind Paul as Mary Peyre
- Neville Robinson as Matt Tilding
- Roger Watkins as Archie
- Josephine Welcome as Hamilton

== Plot ==
=== Part 1 ===
Geoff Dresner (Warren Clarke), a retired safe-cracker, has turned his back on a life of crime in an attempt to turn an honest living as a baker. But his past comes back to haunt him when he's forced to take on one last job in order to help his less than useful son-in-law Terry (Martin Freeman), who has failed to pay his debt to a cutthroat loan shark, and must immediately cough up an enormous sum of money if he has any hope of emerging unscathed. Dresner organises a robbery in an attempt to help Terry, but the plan immediately goes wrong. Dresner finds himself caught in the sights of DS Edward Foster (Hugo Speer), who is struggling financially, and is eager to finally bring him to justice after years of evading the law; and James Hilden (Lee Williams), a hotshot rookie lawyer who has recently married and has a baby on the way.

=== Part 2 ===
Dresner finds himself caught up in a tangled web of lies, secrets and double-crossing, as he tries to find a way to save himself and his family. Not quite ready for his loss of independence, Hilden embarks on an affair with an ex-colleague, and agrees to take on Dresner's case, but unwittingly, his secret love life becomes caught up in his professional affairs, and before he knows it, he is stuck in a vicious circle of deceit and denial. Dresner soon realises that Hilden is unequipped with the experience or know-how to successfully defend him. Foster's second job as a night taxi driver continues to take its toll on his police work, and as a result, he is overlooked for promotion – but he soon realises that the Dresner investigation could be an opportunity for him to make the grade.
