= White Settlers =

- Directed by: Simeon Halligan
- Written by: Ian Fenton
- Produced by: Rachel Richardson-Jones
- Starring: Pollyanna McIntosh; Lee Williams; Joanne Mitchell
- Cinematography: James Swift
- Edited by: Ewa J. Lind
- Music by: Jon Wygens
- Production company: Not a Number
- Distributed by: Falcon Films; Grimm Up North
- Release date: 23 August 2014 (FrightFest)
- Running time: 79 minutes
- Country: United Kingdom
- Language: English

White Settlers (also released as The Blood Lands) is a 2014 British thriller-horror film that was directed by Simeon Halligan. The film had its premiere on 23 August 2014 at Film4 FrightFest and stars Pollyanna McIntosh and Lee Williams as a couple that find that their new home is not as hospitable as they would have hoped.

== Plot ==
Married couple Ed (Lee Williams) and Sarah (Pollyanna McIntosh) have decided that they want to get away from their busy, stressful lives in London and move somewhere more peaceful. They believe that they've found the perfect place in a bucolic farmhouse in Scotland; however, their real estate agent Flo (Joanne Mitchell) informs them that the land is the site of a gruesome battle between the English and the Scottish. Despite this knowledge and Flo's chilly story, Ed and Sarah choose to purchase the farmhouse and restore the property. Initially all seems well, but on their first night they hear strange sounds in the nearby area and discover that they are not at all welcome in the area. Later that night while Sarah is downstairs she witnesses the key coming out of the door, implying someone is entering. Quickly, she hides under a table as three men wearing pig masks enter. Sarah moves to a different room and attempts to climb out of the window, breaking a glass and cutting her hand. She later escapes the house and enters the woods. Sarah runs through the woods before finding a car in front of an old farmhouse that holds Ed hostage. Sarah beats in his captor's face and when a second man comes in, she knocks him down, but as more come, she cuts her Achilles heel. She and Ed escape the house. Ed tells her to hide while he distracts them so that she can make a run for the road. Ed knocks one to the ground and escapes, but is later caught in a bear trap. The captor Ed knocked down wanted to kill him, but another captor stops him, mentioning "a plan" they had for Ed and Sarah.

Sarah runs into a boy who was at their house earlier and he takes her to the road. Sarah is seen limping as many men surround her. She demands to know where her husband is as they close in on her.

The film ends with Sarah and Ed being found in a square in the middle of Manchester, alive. A group of people are having a barbecue at their Scottish home. One of them is the little boy who helped Sarah to the road. He is wearing a pig mask, like the captors, implying that the pig masked captors were the ones that owned the house and wanted the rich couple from London out of their home.

== Cast ==
- Pollyanna McIntosh as Sarah
- Lee Williams as Ed
- Joanne Mitchell as Flo
- James McCreadie as Local
- Dominic Kay as Local

== Reception ==
Critical reception for White Settlers has been mixed, and the film holds a rating of 57% on Rotten Tomatoes, based on 7 reviews. Bloody Disgusting and Starburst both praised the movie, and Bloody Disgusting noted "White Settlers couldn’t have been planned more timely. Released against the political debates of independence raging in Scotland, it’s a relevant film. But it also stands on its own as a fierce, atmospheric thriller." The Hollywood Reporter and The Scotsman panned the film overall, and The Scotsman commented on the film's political and social message, writing "HORROR can be a great genre for engaging with current events. It’s too bad, then, that White Settlers, a film much-hyped as the first independence referendum-themed horror movie, delivers neither decent genre thrills nor provokes much subtextual unease about Scotland’s relationship with England in the run up to the vote."

=== Awards ===
- Festival Trophy for Best Cinematography at the Screamfest Horror Film Festival (2014, won)

== See also ==
- List of films featuring home invasions
