= Lee Williams (actor) =

British actor

- Born: 3 April 1974 (age 52); Bangor, Wales
- Occupation: Actor
- Website: http://www.leewilliams.tv/

Lee Williams (born 3 April 1974) is a British screen actor and former model.

== Early life ==
Lee Williams was born in Bangor. Early in his life he lived in Holyhead with his mother and grandmother and grandfather. He went to a comprehensive school in Warrington, England. He did an art foundation at Lancaster and Morecambe College, then enrolled to study fine art and fashion at Central Saint Martin's College of Art and Fashion in London. It was whilst working for Vivienne Westwood, where he worked at the World's End shop and then helping in her designer shows in Paris; it was here that the photographer Steven Meisel encouraged Lee to pursue modelling.

== Career ==
=== Modelling ===
He was discovered by Steven Meisel in Paris when he was working for Vivienne Westwood. Represented by Models One, he went on to model with top photographers Mario Testino, Bruce Webber, David Bailey, Paolo Roversi, Meisel, Nick Knight - who shot him for the album cover 'Coming up' for the band Suede. He was the 'it' male model of the 90s, where he modelled with Kate Moss for W magazine, as well as numerous appearances in The Face, Sky, Elle, Vogue, Vogue Homme, L'uomo Vogue and Runway Shows and Campaigns for CK Jeans, Versace, D&G, Dries Van Notes, Yohji Yamamoto, Thierry Mugler, Lagerfeld, Anne Demeulemeester, Raf Simmons. He was friends with Alexander McQueen and featured in his first two fashion shows wearing the infamous 'bumsters', and the mannequin company 'Adele Rootstein' immortalised him as a shop mannequin where he was seen in the windows of Liberty, Selfridges and Harvey Nichols.

Williams worked as a model for two and a half years at the time when the heroin chic look was in popular demand and was being popularised by Kate Moss, and used in Calvin Klein advertisements. He was tall, skinny, had long hair and looked androgynous; a perfect candidate to model. Williams worked in many big magazines and was used as a model for The Face, I-D, Arena, Vogue, Elle, L'uomo. He also worked with top photographers such as Mario Testino, Bruce Weber and David Bailey. He did campaigns for Calvin Klein and fashion shows for Versace and Dolce and Gabbana. During his modelling career he lived in Japan, New York City and Paris. He is on the cover of Suede's album 'Coming Up', photographed by Nick Knight.

=== Acting ===
Williams was encouraged by his drama teacher to pursue acting, but instead chose to attend an art school in London, putting acting on hold. He eventually trained at The Neighbourhood Playhouse in New York and The Actors Centre in London, where he focused on The Meisner Technique. He has over 40 screen acting credits, many of them leading roles in some critically acclaimed programmes and films.

As an actor, he played lead roles such as Jon Forsyte in The Forsyte Saga, Ewan in Channel 4's Teachers, Jack the manager of Hotel Babylon, and other TV roles. He was nominated for a Gemini award (Canadian equivalent of an Oscar) for best Lead Actor in No Night Is Too Long alongside Marc Warren.

He auditioned for the role of Tom Riddle in the film Harry Potter and the Chamber of Secrets but lost out to Christian Coulson in the final stages. It was also between him and James Mcavoy for the role of 'Mr Tumnus' in The Lion, The Witch and The Wardrobe. In 2011, he played Henry Mynors in Helen Edmundson's adaptation of Anna of the Five Towns on BBC Radio 4. The same year he appeared in Four Nights in Knaresborough (Morville) at the Southwark Playhouse.

Williams directed an adaptation of Kafka's 'The Trial' at the Edinburgh Festival in 2013 and has been part of the writers programme at The Marlow Theatre in Canterbury, where his first play won a competition and they commissioned him to write a new original piece called 'SNUFF'.

=== Voice Overs ===
Williams is also a prolific voice over artist, represented by the agency Yakety yak in London. Clients include Virgin, HMV, Rimmel, VO5, Nivea, Dove men, Alton Towers, DHL, as well as documentaries and promos for the BBC, ITV, Disney and the History Channel.

== Filmography ==
- Grantchester (TV series) Episode #1.4 (2014) - Dominic Taylor
- White Settlers (2014) – Ed
- When Calls the Heart (2013) – Thomas Higgins
- Delhi in a Day Feature Film – Jasper (2010)
- The Tudors Robert Testwood (2009)
- Hotel Babylon (2008) – Jack Harrison
- Casualty (TV series) (2008–2011) – Brian
- Lena: The Bride of Ice (2008) – Johnny
- Kimono (2007) – Narrator
- The Waiting Room – Brian
- New Street Law – Joe Stevens (12 episodes, 2006–2007)
- Miss Marie Lloyd – Queen of The Music Hall (2007) (TV) – Freddie Lloyd
- Popcorn (2007) – Emil
- The Trial (TV) – Clay
- No Angels – Patrick (2 episodes, 2006)
- Ideal – Luke (4 episodes, 2007)
- Coming Up (2006) (TV) – Clay
- Stalking Pete Doherty (2005) (TV) – Narrator
- Teachers – Ewan Doherty (Series 4, 2004) (9 episodes)
- Murder in Suburbia – Jamie Finch (1 episode, 2004)
- The Debt (2003) (TV) – James Hilden
- The Forsyte Saga: To Let (2003) (TV mini-series) – Jon Forsyte
- The American Embassy – Drew Barkley (3 episodes, 2002)
- No Night Is Too Long (2002) (TV film) – Tim Cornish
- Vallen (2001) – Lucas
- Me Without You (2001) – Ben
- In His Life: The John Lennon Story (2000) (TV) – Stuart Sutcliffe
- Losing It (2000) (TV) – Jude
- Urban Gothic – Carter (1 episode, 2000)
- A Many Splintered Thing (2000) – Simon
- Billy Elliot (2000) – Tutor 4
- Canone Inverso (2000) – David Blau
- Mauvaise passe (1999) – Customer in cafe
- Elephant Juice (1999) – George
- Boyz Unlimited (1999) – Scott LeTissier
- The Wolves of Kromer (1998) – Seth
- Still Crazy (1998) – Young Keith
