= Medically Yourrs =

- Genre: Drama; Web series
- Created by: Mayuri Roychoudhury
- Developed by: Ekta Kapoor
- Written by: Dialogues; Sumit Raje Shahi; Durjoy Raje Dutta
- Screenplay by: Mayuri Roychoudhury
- Story by: Mayuri Roychoudhury
- Directed by: Abhijit Das
- Creative director: Mitali Mitra
- Starring: Shantanu Maheshwari; Nityaami Shirke
- Composer: Harshwardhan Dixit
- Country of origin: India
- Original language: Hindi
- No. of seasons: 1
- No. of episodes: 10

Production
- Executive producer: Mayur Shah
- Producers: Ekta Kapoor; Shobha Kapoor
- Editors: Vikas Sharma; Vishal Sharma; Sunil Bhattarai; Risabh Singh
- Camera setup: Multi-camera
- Running time: 17-24 minutes
- Production company: Balaji Telefilms Limited

Original release
- Network: ALT Balaji
- Release: 27 May 2019

Medically Yourrs is a 2019 Hindi web series created and produced by Ekta Kapoor for video on demand platform ALTBalaji. The series stars Shantanu Maheshwari and Nityaami and revolves around the plight of a medical students and explores the problems faced by them in the quirkiest possible way.

The series is available for streaming on the ALT Balaji App and its associated websites since its release date.

== Plot ==
The series revolves around a lives of medical students. It explores the problems and issues faced by them. In series Discuss about bestfriend, and it's friendship.

== Cast ==
- Shantanu Maheshwari as Abir
- Nityaami Shirke as Nibedita
- Keval Dasani as Lolly
- Manas Adhiya as Pallav
- Radhe Lotwala as Vishesh
- Priyanka Arya as Nishta
- Jayna Ruchandani as Nanki
- Mrinal Dutt as Akshay
- Ivan Rodrigues as Dr. Komudhi Banerjee (Dean)
- Bijay Anand as Dr. Basu
- Shubhavi Choksey as Mrs. Basu
- Poonam Gurung as Maina
- Trishna Mukherjee
- Shruti Bapna as Chandni Ma'am
- Subha Rajput as Ruchi
- Annie Singh as Ojeeta
- Vijay Tilani as Bedanto
- Siddharth Sen as Koustub

== Episodes ==
No.	Title	Directed by	Written by	Original release date
1	"Welcome to Hell"	Abhijit Das	Mayuri Roychoudhury	May 27, 2019
2	"Kompetition Ka Keeda"	Abhijit Das	Mayuri Roychoudhury	May 27, 2019
3	"Udta Hua Teer"	Abhijit Das	Mayuri Roychoudhury	May 27, 2019
4	"Khoda Pahad Nikli Maiyaa"	Abhijit Das	Mayuri Roychoudhury	May 27, 2019
5	"Brain Freeze"	Abhijit Das	Mayuri Roychoudhury	May 27, 2019
6	"First Love My A*s"	Abhijit Das	Mayuri Roychoudhury	May 27, 2019
7	"Teri Tou Le Lii.."	Abhijit Das	Mayuri Roychoudhury	May 27, 2019
8	"Bokach*ddaaaaaa!!"	Abhijit Das	Mayuri Roychoudhury	May 27, 2019
9	"Khola Mooh, Nikla Sach!!"	Abhijit Das	Mayuri Roychoudhury	May 27, 2019
10	"Karma is a B***h"	Abhijit Das	Mayuri Roychoudhury	May 27, 2019
