= Shruti Bapna =

Indian television actress

- Occupation: Actress
- Years active: 2008–present

Shruti Bapna is an Indian actress who has worked in commercial films, web series, and TV shows.

== Early life and education ==
Shruti Bapna was born in India and was raised in Nigeria. She did her primary schooling there, then she moved to Mumbai for higher studies and her career.

== Career ==
Shruti made her film debut in Wake up Sid (2009). In 2013, she appeared in The Lunchbox. She has since then worked in films such as Daddy, Mardaani 2, Gabbar is Back, Umrika and Chitrakut. Bapna appeared in shows The Verdict, Medically Yourrs, and MTV Girls on Top. She is also known for Saas Bina Sasural as Nitika, and for her role as Vandita Bala Chandran in Ye Hai Mohabbatein. Shruti started her career with the role of Parul in Jasuben Jayantilaal Joshi Ki Joint Family on Imagine TV.

== Filmography ==
=== Films ===
| Year | Title | Role | Notes | Ref(s) |
|---|---|---|---|---|
| 2009 | Wake Up Sid | Debbie | | |
| 2012 | Rowdy Rathore | Paro's friend | | |
| 2012 | Ekk Deewana Tha | Anu Kulkarni | | |
| 2013 | The Lunchbox | Mehrunisa | | |
| 2013 | War Chhod Na Yaar | Anu | | |
| 2015 | Gabbar Is Back | Lakshmi | | |
| 2017 | Daddy | Rani | | |
| 2019 | Chitrakut | Kim | | |
| 2019 | Mardaani 2 | Bharti | | |

=== Web series ===
| Year | Title | Role | Ref. |
|---|---|---|---|
| 2015–2018 | Sense8 | Devi | |
| 2016 | Girls on Top | Diana | |
| 2019 | Medically Yourrs | Chandni Ma'am | |
| 2019 | The Verdict - State vs Nanavati | Mrs Trivedi | |
| 2020 | Breathe: Into the Shadows | Natasha Garewal | |
| 2022 | Human | Sucheta Shekhawat | |

=== Television ===
| Year | Title | Role | Ref(s) |
|---|---|---|---|
| | Sasural Genda Phool | Peeya | |
| 2010–2012 | Saas Bina Sasural | Nitika Vedprakash Chaturvedi | |
| 2013 | Chhanchhan | Rupali | |
| 2013–2017 | Yeh Hai Mohabbatein | Vandita Bala Chandran | |
| 2022 | Shadyantra | Manisha | |

== External link ==
  - SHRUTI BAPNA Official Website
- Shruti Bapna at IMDb
