= Soch: A Perception =

- Directed by: Ravi Gautam
- Written by: Ravi Gautam; Pepino Pushpani
- Produced by: Jennifer Pengel; Rahul Sharma
- Starring: Anjali Patil; Mukti Ravi Das; Silpi Dutta; Muzammil Bhawani; Ritika Sharma; Gauri Webster; Dayal Prasad
- Cinematography: Pepino Pushpani
- Edited by: Ravi Gautam, Pepino Pushpani
- Music by: Dipesh Varma
- Production company: Webfilmland Productions
- Distributed by: Webfilmland Productions
- Release date: 2024
- Running time: 100 minutes
- Country: India / Germany
- Language: Hindi

Soch: A Perception is a 2024 Indo-German psychological thriller written and directed by Indian-German filmmaker Ravi Gautam. Produced by Webfilmland Productions, the film explores gender inequality, identity politics, and communal tensions in contemporary Indian society.

== Plot ==
Set in the Himalayan village of Arkee, police officer Priyanka Negi (Anjali Patil) investigates the mysterious disappearance of activist Shaila Awasthi (Silpi Dutta). As the case uncovers communal fault lines, Negi faces growing media pressure and political tension while confronting her own moral compass.

== Cast ==
- Anjali Patil as Priyanka Negi
- Mukti Das as Bashar
- Silpi Dutta as Shaila Awasthi
- Muzammil Bhawani as Nadeem
- Bhavani Bashir Yasir as Prem Awasthi
- Ritika Sharma as Sumitra
- Gauri Webster as Shanta Awasthi
- Dayal Prasad as Officer Sharma

== Production ==
Ravi Gautam served as director, writer, editor, and VFX artist, with cinematography by Pepino Pushpani and music composed by Dipesh Varma. In interviews, Gautam explained that the narrative draws from his own observations of patriarchal dynamics within Indian society and the impact of religious identity politics.

== Release and reception ==
The film premiered in 2024 and screened at multiple international film festivals:

- Official Selection – India International Film Festival of Boston (2024)
- Official Selection – Chicago South Asian Film Festival (2024)
- Official Selection – Chennai International Film Festival (2024)
- Official Selection – Jagran Film Festival (2025)
- Official Selection – Bollywood Festival Norway (2025)

=== Awards ===
At the 22nd Indian Film Festival Stuttgart (2025), Soch: A Perception received the Director's Vision Award, one of the festival's top honors. German daily Hannoversche Allgemeine Zeitung described the award as a "prestigious recognition for Webfilmland’s social cinema." The film was also highlighted by MFG Filmförderung Baden-Württemberg among notable features of the festival lineup.

== Awards and nominations ==
- Director's Vision Award – Indian Film Festival Stuttgart (2025)
- Best Debut Director – Ayodhya International Film Festival (2024)
- Best Actor (Female) – Florida South Asian Film Festival (2024)
- Best Feature Film – Florida South Asian Film Festival (2024)
- Best Feature Film – Chauri Chaura International Film Festival (2025)
- Best Actor (Female) – Chauri Chaura International Film Festival (2025)

== Themes ==
The film examines how patriarchal social structures intersect with religious identity politics in modern India. Gautam noted, "Misogyny often hides behind the cloak of religious identity-politics; this film aims to give diverse voices a platform without taking a partisan stance."
