= Delhi in a Day =

- Poster
- Directed by: Prashant Nair
- Produced by: Kumar C. Dev; Chintu B. Mohapatra; Prashant Nair
- Starring: Victor Banerjee; Vidya Bhushan; Lillete Dubey; Kulbhushan Kharbanda; Arun Mallick Kumar; Anjali Patil; Lee Williams; Dinesh Yadav; Gourav soni
- Cinematography: Eun-ah Lee
- Edited by: Sylvie Landra; Bhuvan Srinivasan
- Music by: Mathias Duplessy
- Release dates: October 2011 (Mumbai Film Festival); 24 August 2012 (India)
- Country: India
- Language: Hindi

Delhi in a Day is a 2011 Hindi independent film directed by Prashant Nair. The film was released on 24 August 2012 in cinemas. As per director Prashant Nair his film uses flashes of comedy to shine a light on the uncomfortable realities of contemporary life in a country that has been transformed in many ways by two decades of economic growth. The film features Victor Banerjee, Vidya Bhushan, Lillete Dubey, Kulbhushan Kharbanda, Arun Mallick Kumar, Anjali Patil, Lee Williams, Gourav soni and Dinesh Yadav.

== Cast ==
- Victor Banerjee
- Vidya Bhushan
- Lillete Dubey
- Kulbhushan Kharbanda
- Arun Mallick Kumar
- Anjali Patil
- Lee Williams (actor)
- Dinesh Yadav
- Gourav soni

== Plot ==
Jasper (Lee Williams) has arrived in Delhi to begin a tour of India, where the newness of his surroundings quickly proves overwhelming. As he is drawn into the dynamics of his host family, the Bhatias, he finds that his mere presence has upset the natural order of things. Jasper finds that the first day of his journey is possibly more than he bargained for.

== Production ==
=== Casting and filming ===
Movie is set in sprawling bungalow in a posh part of New Delhi.

== Reception ==
=== Critical reception ===
Delhi In A Day had mostly positive reviews. "There's something immensely charming and instantly likeable about Prashant Nair's Delhi In A Day that makes you settle into the plot rather comfortably, quite early on in the film", said Sudhish Kamath of The Hindu. It is a complete package - a simple story well-told, natural performances and the right dose of entertainment too said Troy Ribeiro of Yahoo Movies. "As a standalone story, Delhi in a Day is watchable. But the moment it attempts to make a statement on the socio-economical strata, you feel like calling it a day." said Gaurav Malani of Times Of India. "Overall, ‘Delhi in a Day’ is a simple film which is not made with a preoccupied mind. It largely remains sweet but conveys the point strongly." said Rohit Vats of IBNLive. "Though it’s not mainstream cinema, Delhi In a Day has all the ingredients for an entertaining flick. It's a must watch." said Zinnia Ray Chaudhuri of DNA.

== Festivals and awards ==
Delhi in a Day was very active on film festivals. During this time it has won several awards. Below is the list of festival it has visited and awards it has won:

- Opening Film, Film India Worldwide Section of the 2011 Mumbai Film Festival
- International Competition, International Film Festival Of Kerala 2011
- Best Feature Jury Award, Indian Film Festival Houston 2011
- Award of Excellence, IndieFest 2011
- Official Selection, Palo Alto International Film Festival 2011
- Florida International Film Festival 2011
- Best Screenplay Award, Cincinnati Film Festival 2011
- Best Director, Honorable Mention, Cincinnati Film Festival 2011
- San Francisco Asian International Film Festival 2012
- London Indian Film Festival 2012
- New York Indian Film Festival 2012 (nominated for best director and best actress)
- Indian Film Festival of Los Angeles 2012
- Silk Screen Film Festival 2012
- Opening Film, Monthly Film Series at the National Center of Performing Arts Mumbai 2011
- DC South Asian Film Festival 2012
- Honorable Mention, Accolade Competition 2011
- Closing night film, Bollywood & Beyond Festival, Stuttgart 2012
- Official Selection, INDIA WEEK at The Hamburg Film Festival 2012
- Best In Show, Accolade Competition 2012
- Closing Film, Bollywood & Beyond Film Festival 2012, Director's Vision Award
- Kinemathek Hamburg 2012, India Focus
