= Ferari Fauj =

- Video cover
- Directed by: Prasanta Bal
- Based on: Ferari Fauj by Utpal Dutt
- Screenplay by: Prasanta Bal
- Produced by: Mohan Kukreja
- Starring: Soumitra Chatterjee; Mithun Chakraborty; Debashree Roy; Sabyasachi Chakraborty; Lily Chakravarty; Debraj Ray; Indrani Haldar; Kunal Mitra; Kaushik Sen; Bishwajit Sarkar; Debesh Roy Chowdhury; Victor Banerjee
- Cinematography: Victor Banerjee; Gour Karmakar
- Edited by: Dulal Dutta
- Music by: Songs: Nabin Chatterjee Background score: V. Balsara
- Production company: Srijani Chitram Pvt. Ltd.
- Distributed by: Srijani Chitram Pvt. Ltd.
- Release date: 2002
- Running time: 166 minutes
- Country: India
- Language: Bengali

Ferari Fauj is a 2002 Indian Bengali-language period political drama film co-written and directed by Prasanta Bal. Produced by Srijani Chitram Pvt Ltd, the film was based on the play of the same name written by Utpal Dutt. It stars an ensemble cast consisting of Soumitra Chatterjee, Mithun Chakraborty, Debashree Roy, Sabyasachi Chakraborty, Lily Chakravarty, Debraj Ray, Indrani Haldar, Kunal Mitra, Kaushik Sen and Debesh Roy Chowdhury in the main leads, with Shobha Sen and Victor Banerjee in a special appearances. The Background score of the film was composed by V. Balsara. Victor Banerjee is the cinematographer of the film. Set in 1932 against the backdrop of the revolutionary movement for Indian independence, it narrates the tale of some Indian revolutionaries who form an uprising against the British colonialism in India.

== Plot ==
Ashok Chatterjee, an Indian revolutionary bombards the jeep of the police-super Wilmort and accidentally drops his muffler while evading, which Brajen Chowdhury, the zamindar of Bhubandanga identifies to be his. Ashok meets schoolmaster Debabrata Bose and his revolutionary team at Nilkuthi. Debabrata Bose informs Ashok that he has been instructed by Shanti Roy, the mentor of their team to stay at Sirajul's house as he will not be able to return his home because Brajen Chowdhury has identified his muffler after the bombing. Radha gives a letter of Shanti Roy to Ashok who reads it and finds that they have been instructed to meet at the graveyard tomorrow. When they gather at the graveyard, schoolmaster Debabrata Bose reveals Shanti Roy's plan that they have to dig down a tunnel from Radha's house to the graveyard. In the middle of their conversation they discover police over a distance. Everyone flees while Ashok chased by dogs takes resort to his house and meets his family after a long time. Unfortunately police arrives and arrests Ashok. Sirajul gives Shanti Roy's letter to schoolmaster Debabrata Bose who reads it at once and tells others that Ashok has been arrested. Jyotirmoy and Kumud fume that Ashok went to meet his family despite Shanti Roy's instruction not to go his home. Schoolmaster Debabrata Bose says that Ashok has done so out of an emotional interest. Kumud again fumes at Debabrata Bose and says that there is no room for emotion in revolution. He tells Debabrata Bose to leave his post if he entertains this idea of being an emotional fool. To this Debabrata Bose counter argues why Kumud secretly meets Debjani Dasgupta. Everyone at once wants to know who Debjani Dasgupta is and Debabrata Bose reveals that she is the daughter of Hiten Dasgupta. Now everyone fumed with Kumud thinks that it is Kumud who is a spy of Hiten Dasgupta and chases him down the tunnel to kill him but Radha finally stands between them and urges not to kill Kumud. They spare him.

Hiten Dasgupta, the officer-in-charge of Bhubabdanga keeps torturing Ashok who never yields to say who Shanti Roy is. Hiten Dasgupta brings Ashok's wife Shachi to the cell where Ashok is kept and in front of him several ruffians rape her. Still Ashok does not yield to reveal who Shanti Roy is. Ashok becomes seriously ill with high fever. He keeps muttering to himself and from this Hiten Dasgupta learns that a woman named Radha is involved with this revolutionary activity. He goes to Radha's place and discovers a spade, a pitcher and a wooden stuff beneath it in Radha's bedroom. He feels dubious and breaks the pitcher apart. Radha takes a revolver out but accidentally drops it which Hiten Dasgupta at once picks up. Now Radha turns into a fine actress. She narrates the whole plan to Dasgupta and makes him believe that she has been exhausted serving the team and intends to stand out of this. She stealthily poisons a glass of wine and gives it to Dasgupta who drinks it and dies. Shanti Roy arrives at Radha's place and informs everyone that Jackson has planned to go to Dhaka from Bhubandanga; and the night he will leave, an attack has to be launched by them at the steamer port to bombard Jackson along with the port and the oil depot.

Kumud changes his mind and decides to stand out of all the revolutionary activities as he intends to settle with his ladylove Debjani Dasgupta. He stealthily goes to Prakash Mukherjee, the new officer-in-charge and reveals the plan of Shanti Roy. Ashok overhears this conversation. He evades through the window of the toilet and shoots Kumud to death on the way back to his home. Prakash Mukherjee comes to check Radha's house where he arrests Debabrata Bose. Radha is compelled to guide him along with his unit through the tunnel where he faces fight-back from the hidden revolutionists. At the same time the rest of the revolutionists under Shanti Roy's leadership charge upon the police at port. Ashok joins them. He sets himself on fire and runs into the oil depot.

== Cast ==
- Soumitra Chatterjee as Jogen Chatterjee
- Mithun Chakraborty as Ashok Chatterjee, Jogen's son
- Debashree Roy as Shachi, Ashok's wife
- Sabyasachi Chakraborty as Nilmoni Mitra / Shanti Roy
- Lily Chakravarty as Bangabasi, Jogen's wife and Ashok's mother
- Debraj Ray as Debabrata Bose, a school master
- Indrani Haldar as Radha, a prostitude
- Kunal Mitra as Jyotirmoy
- Kaushik Sen as Kumud
- Bishwajit Sarkar as Bipin
- Debesh Roy Choudhury as Prakash Mukherjee
- Piyali Mitra as Debjani Dasgupta
- Shibani Bhattacharjee
- Kanaklata Devi
- Samir Majumder as Inspector Dasgupta

=== Guest appearance ===
- Shobha Sen
- Victor Banerjee as father

== See more ==
- Hindustani Sipahi
