= Akorik =

- Directed by: Tathagata Bhattacherjee
- Starring: Victor Banerjee; Rituparna Sengupta; Anuradha Roy; Sudeshna Chakraborty; Angana Bose; Master Ankan Mallick
- Cinematography: Rana Dasgupta
- Edited by: Sumit Chowdhury
- Music by: Debjit Bera
- Production company: Iceberg Creations
- Release date: 7 April 2023
- Country: India
- Language: Bengali

Akorik is a 2023 Indian Bengali-language family drama film directed by Tathagata Bhattacherjee. The film stars Victor Banerjee, Rituparna Sengupta, Anuradha Roy in lead roles. The film premiered on 28th Kolkata International Film Festival.

== Synopsis ==
Akorik is a story about a relationship between an old man, who is a product of the traditional Bengali Joint Family System, and a little boy.

== Cast ==
- Victor Banerjee
- Rituparna Sengupta
- Anuradha Roy
- Sudeshna Chakraborty
- Angana Bose
- Master Ankan Mallick
