= Satyameba Jayate =

2008 Indian action thriller film

- Poster of Satyameba Jayate
- Directed by: Milan Bhowmik
- Written by: Milan Bhowmik; Mithun Chakraborty
- Produced by: Ashok Kumar Bed; Soma Bhowmik
- Starring: Mithun Chakraborty; Puneet Issar; Seemran; Tania; Priyadarshini
- Music by: Subhayu
- Release date: 18 April 2008
- Country: India
- Language: Bengali

Satyameba Jayate is a 2008 Indian Bengali-language neo-noir action thriller film directed by Milan Bhowmik and produced by Ashok Kumar Bed and Soma Bhowmik, starring Mithun Chakraborty, Puneet Issar, Seemran, Tania and Priyadarshini.

== Plot ==
Satyameva Jayate is the story of a traffic constable named Vinayak Chakraborty who witnesses a murder committed by a politician's son in night and the reactions he had to face when he tries to bring the culprits to book. As a bunch of dishonest bureaucrats and corrupted cops acts against him, he had to turn into the long-haired, local goon Pandiya to take revenge.At the end he finally killed yadav by throwing a big knife on him.

== Cast ==
- Mithun Chakraborty as traffic police constable Vinayak Chakraborty/Pandeya
- Puneet Issar as corrupt minister M. P. Yadav
- Shankar Chakraborty as corrupt police officer Chakradhar
- Sanjib Dasgupta as corrupt DGP Ghoshal
- Joy Badlani as ACP Ashok Chakraborty
- Lokesh Ghosh as Vinayak's friend
- Shyamal Dutta
- Anamika Saha as Vinayak's mother
- Biplab Chatterjee as a lawyer
- Suman Dey, newsreader of Star Ananda, guest appearance
