= Ramu Ramanathan =

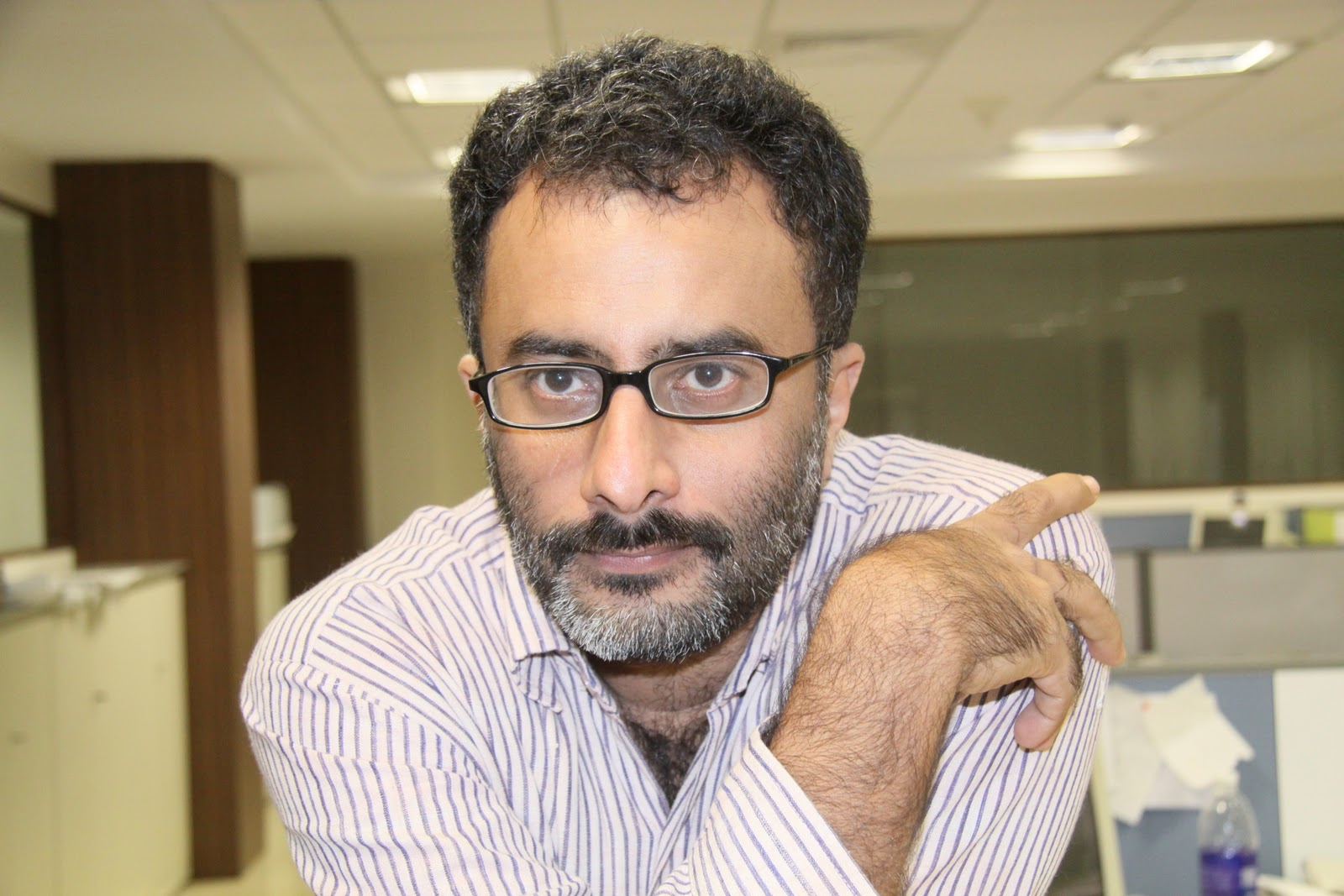
- Born: 29 December 1967 (age 57); Calcutta (now Kolkata), West Bengal, India
- Education: Bachelor of Science, Chemistry, University of Mumbai, 1988
- Spouse: Kinnari Vohra
- Website: placesotherthanthis.blogspot.com

Ramakrishnan Ramanathan, known as Ramu Ramanathan, is an Indian playwright and director. His plays include Mahadevbhai, Cotton 56, Polyester 84, Jazz, Comrade Kumbhakarna, and Postcards From Bardoli.

Besides playwriting, Ramanathan is the editor of PrintWeek and WhatPackaging? magazines. He has been associated with the print industry for 30 years.

He is the author of three books. 3, Sakina Manzil And Other Plays, a collection of eight plays and two collections of poems, My Encounters with a Peacock and To Sit on A Stone - And Other Shorts.

His book 3, Sakina Manzil And Other Plays, is published by Orient Blackswan in collaboration with the English and Foreign Languages University.

== Publications ==
- Combat, published by National School of Drama (2003)
- Collaborators And Mahadevbhai, Sahitya Akademi (2006)
- Tathasthu ("So Be It"), in The Little Magazine (2010)
- Mahadevbhai (in Marathi), Popular Prakashan (2011)
- 3 Sakina Manzil and Other Plays (in English), Orient Blackswan (2012) - An anthology of eight plays: Shanti, Shanti It’s A War; The Boy Who Stopped Smiling; Curfew; Mahadevbhai (1892–1942); Collaborators; 3, Sakina Manzil; Shakespeare And She; Jazz.
- Book Binding with Adhesives along with Tony Clark and P Sajith
- My Encounters With a Peacock, Red River (2017)
- Babri Masjid, 25 Years .. along with Irfan Engineer and Sameena Dalwai (Gyan Prakashan) (2017)
- To Sit on A Stone - And Other Shorts, Red River (2020)
- Mumbai Murmurings: 213* Tiny Tales of Theatre (Manipal Universal Press) (2023)
- Two plays: Cotton 56, Polyester 84 and Comrade Kumbhakarna, Red River (2023)
