= Tryst with Destiny (TV series) =

- Based on: Tryst with Destiny by Jawaharlal Nehru
- Written by: Prashant Nair; Neeraj Pandey
- Directed by: Prashant Nair
- Starring: Vineet Kumar Singh; Suhasini Maniratnam; Jaideep Ahlawat; Victor Banerjee; Ashish Vidyarthi
- Music by: Naren Chandavarkar; Benedict Taylor
- Country of origin: India
- Original language: Hindi
- No. of seasons: 1
- No. of episodes: 4

Production
- Producer: Manish Mundra
- Cinematography: Avinash Arun
- Editor: Xavier Box
- Camera setup: Multi-camera
- Running time: 35-42 minutes

Original release
- Network: SonyLIV
- Release: 5 November 2021

Tryst with Destiny is a 2021 SonyLIV original Hindi-language television series written by Prashant Nair and Neeraj Pandey and directed by Prashant Nair. It stars Vineet Kumar Singh, Suhasini Maniratnam, Jaideep Ahlawat, Victor Banerjee, Ashish Vidyarthi, Palomi Ghosh, Kani Kusruti, Lillete Dubey and others.

== Cast ==
- Suhasini Maniratnam as Yayati Mudiraj
- Vineet Kumar Singh as Gautam
- Victor Banerjee as Mr. Ashwa
- Lillete Dubey as Mrs. Ashwa
- Ashish Vidyarthi as Galava Mudiraj
- Sahana Vasudevan as Madhavi Mudiraj
- Ivan Sylvester Rodrigues as Galava's Lawyer

== Release ==
The series was premiered on SonyLIV on 5 November 2021.

== Critical reception ==
Reviewing for Scroll.in, Nandini Ramnath observed that "The background score by Benedict Taylor and Naren Chandavarkar might have been more impactful if it hadn’t been plastered over every other scene.". Shilajit Mitra of Cinema Express stated that the series "never sets its characters free." Udita Jhunjhunwala for Moneycontrol spoke about director, and wrote "His frustrations with the state of the nation, a revisiting of Nehru’s speech."

== Award ==
Year	Award	Category	Result	Ref.
2020	Tribeca Festival	Best Screenplay	Won	
