= Prashant Nair =

Indian film director, screenwriter and producer

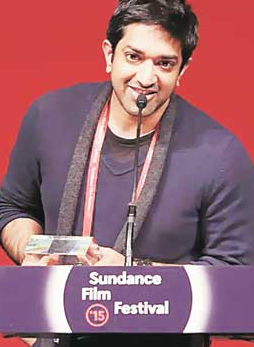
- Nair at the Sundance Film Festival in January 2015
- Born: Chandigarh, India
- Occupations: Film director & screenwriter
- Years active: 2011-present

Prashant Nair is an Indian film director, screenwriter and producer best known for his 2015 feature film Umrika, starring Suraj Sharma and Tony Revolori, which premiered at the 2015 Sundance Film Festival and won the World Cinema Dramatic Audience Award. His latest feature, Tryst With Destiny, premiered at the 2020 Tribeca Film Festival where it won the Best Screenplay in an International Narrative award.

== Biography ==
Nair was born in Chandigarh, India to diplomat parents but was raised in Europe, Africa and Asia before going on to live and work in New York, Paris, Prague, Berlin and Mumbai. He credits his constant moving and exposure to different parts of the world as the biggest impact on the subjects of his films. As a result of his upbringing, Nair is fluent in English, French and Hindi and has studied Italian, German and Arabic.

He initially worked as a social media entrepreneur well until late 2010 when he first transitioned towards a career in film. His first full-length film was the micro-budget Delhi In A Day which Nair has said he made as "a sort of film school." The film went on to have a limited theatrical release in India in 2012 and was well received by critics, voted one of the top ten independent films of the year by Times of India.

His 2015 film, Umrika became the first Indian feature to win a top award at the Sundance Film Festival, taking home the World Cinema Dramatic Audience Award. Its European premiere took place at the 2015 Karlovy Vary Film Festival following which the film went on to play at over forty international film festivals, picking up numerous accolades including the HP Bridging the Borders Award at the 2016 Palm Springs International Film Festival and the FIPRESCI Critic's prize at the Cairo International Film Festival 2015.

Shortly after its premiere, theatrical rights of the film were sold by sales agent Beta Cinema to France, Germany, Austria, Australia, South Korea and numerous other territories, making it one of the more widely distributed Indian independent films in recent times.

Nair has said that the film is "about the mythology of America and, more generally, how cultures perceive each other: the stereotypes, assumptions, misunderstandings and labeling as “exotic” of all things unfamiliar".

In 2018, Nair directed two episodes of the Amazon Prime TV series Made In Heaven.

Tryst With Destiny, a co-production between Drishyam Films and Backup Media, won the Best Screenplay in an International Narrative award at the 2020 Tribeca Film Festival where it screened for a jury that included Demián Bichir, Danny Boyle, Judith Godrèche, Sabine Hoffman and William Hurt.

Nair showran, co-created, co-directed 2023's Trial By Fire, a Netflix Original Series based on the book by Neelam and Shekhar Krishnamoorthy, the couple who lost their children in the uphaar cinema fire. The series chronicles the event and their subsequent battle for justice. It was nominated for five Filmfare awards, winning Best Actress and Best Series Critic's Choice. The series currently holds a 100% Rotten Tomatoes rating.

== Filmography ==
Year	Film	Notes
2012	Delhi In A Day	Debut
2015	Umrika	won World Cinema Dramatic Audience Award at 2015 Sundance Film Festival
2019	Made in Heaven	2 episodes only; Best Director, Indian Television Academy Awards 2019
2020	Tryst With Destiny	Best Screenplay In An International Narrative, Tribeca Film Festival 2020
2023	Trial By Fire	TV series on Netflix, Filmfare Best Series Critic's Choice 2023
