= Trial by Fire (TV series) =

Indian crime drama television series

- Official poster
- Genre: Crime Drama
- Created by: Prashant Nair; Kevin Luperchio
- Based on: Trial by Fire: The Tragic Tale of the Uphaar Fire Tragedy by Neelam Krishnamoorthy and Shekhar Krishnamoorthy
- Written by: Prashant Nair; Kevin Luperchio
- Directed by: Prashant Nair; Randeep Jha; Avani Deshpande
- Starring: Abhay Deol; Ashish Vidyarthi; Anupam Kher; Rajshri Deshpande; Rajesh Tailang; Ratna Pathak Shah; Shilpa Shukla
- Country of origin: India
- Original language: Hindi
- No. of seasons: 1
- No. of episodes: 7

Production
- Producers: Henry Dcunha; Sidharth Jain; Rishi Negi; Vinod Iyer; Prashant Nair (Showrunner)
- Cinematography: Saumyananda Sahi
- Camera setup: Multi-camera
- Running time: 45-48 minutes
- Production companies: Endemol Shine India; House of Talkies

Original release
- Network: Netflix
- Release: 13 January 2023

Trial By Fire is a 2023 Indian Hindi-language crime drama television series written by Prashant Nair, Kevin Luperchio and directed by Prashant Nair and Randeep Jha and Avani Deshpande. It stars Abhay Deol, Ashish Vidyarthi, Anupam Kher, Rajshri Deshpande, Rajesh Tailang, Ratna Pathak Shah, Shilpa Shukla, Shardul Bharadwaj and others. The series is based on the book Trial by Fire: The Tragic Tale of the Uphaar Fire Tragedy authored by Neelam Krishnamoorthy and Shekhar Krishnamoorthy about the Uphaar Cinema fire.

At the 2023 Filmfare OTT Awards, Trial by Fire received 6 nominations, including Best Drama Series, Best Director in a Drama Series (Nair) and Best Actor in a Drama Series (Deol) and won 2 awards – Best Series (Critics) and Best Actress in a Drama Series (Deshpande).

== Cast ==
- Abhay Deol as Shekhar Krishnamoorthy
- Rajshri Deshpande as Neelam Krishnamoorthy
- Abhishek Sharrma as Ujjwal Krishnamoorthy (Shekhar and Neelam's son)
- Ashish Vidyarthi as Neeraj Suri
- Anupam Kher as Captain Hardeep Bedi
- Ratna Pathak Shah as Mrs. Bedi
- Atul Kumar as Mahesh Karve
- Ivan Rodrigues as Abhishek
- Shardul Bhardwaj as Mr. Arora
- Shilpa Shukla as Shalini
- Rajesh Tailang as Veer Singh
- Nimisha Nair as Amrita Singh
- T. M. Karthik as Minister
- Punit Tiwari as Veer Singh's Son-in-Law
- Shardul Bharadwaj as Umesh
- Akanksha Vishwakarma as female AVUT member
- Sharmila Kumari as news reporter
- Chetan Sharma as Chirag
- Jaspal Sharma as Hari
- Abhinav Jha as Rupesh
- Kiran Sharma as Sarla
- Mohit Tripathi as Reporter

== Episodes ==
No.	Title	Directed by	Written by	Original release date
1	"Trial by Fire"	Prashant Nair	Prashant Nair, Kevin Luperchio	13 January 2023
2	"A.V.U.T"	Prashant Nair, Randeep Jha	Kevin Luperchio, Prashant Nair	13 January 2023
3	"Memorial"	Prashant Nair, Randeep Jha	Prashant Nair, Kevin Luperchio	13 January 2023
4	"Uphaar"	Prashant Nair, Randeep Jha	Kevin Luperchio, Prashant Nair	13 January 2023
5	"Heroes"	Prashant Nair	Prashant Nair, Kevin Luperchio	13 January 2023
6	"Villains"	Prashant Nair, Randeep Jha, Avani Deshpande	Kevin Luperchio, Prashant Nair	13 January 2023
7	"Border"	Prashant Nair	Prashant Nair, Kevin Luperchio	13 January 2023

== Reception ==
Praising the performance of Rajshri Deshpande, Anuj Kumar of The Hindu in his review stated "Delivering a flawless performance that will remain etched in memory for years, Rajshri Deshpande makes us forget that we are watching a dramatic adaptation of true events, and Abhay Deol plays a perfect foil as the sedate Shekhar."

Santanu Das of Hindustan Times in his review stated "Trial by Fire is an urgent and important work that urges the viewers to sit up and take notice of a decades-old tragedy that has been passed from one verdict to another. Rather than bridging the trials and calculations of a court-room investigation thriller, this is a controlled, heartbreaking drama that looks back in order to ask what has changed."

Mike McCahill of Variety wrote "Trial by Fire becomes vastly more kaleidoscopic than the linear procedural form typically allows. Nair and Luperchio dig out involving subplots for the Ansals’ enforcer Neeraj (Ashish Vidyarthi) and repairman Veer Singh (Rajesh Tailang), while a haunting, deftly acted sidebar centred on a retired Army couple (Anupam Kher and Ratna Pathak Shah) allows the show to re-examine both the veracity of the film people were literally dying to see, and what India was prepared to stand and fight for circa 1997."

Elisa Guimarães of Collider stated "Over the course of seven episodes, the miniseries chronicles the family’s long struggle in the Indian justice system, as well as the pain of losing one’s children in such a horrifying, unexpected way."

Shubhra Gupta of The Indian Express expressed that she was in the same theatre for the 12 o clock show, just three hours before the incident but moved to another theatre, and after reaching home she got the information about the incident. She wrote "Gopal and Sushil Ansal may still be the biggest names in the construction business, the charges against them may have been drastically reduced, they may have escaped serving their long sentence, but there is no missing the fact that they were brought to book. It was also their trial by fire, made a reality by Neelam and Shekhar, who have managed to start some ‘badlaav’, as opposed to ‘badla’, even though their fight for justice is far from over."

Saibal Chatterjee of NDTV rated 4 out 5 stars and wrote "The script adopts a consistently solemn tone to convey the magnitude of the Krishnamoorthy's loss and sorrow. The impact is enhanced manifold by a performance of stupendous power from Rajshri Deshpande as Neelam, who has been at the forefront of the campaign to prevent the misuse of power and pelf to escape culpability."

Deepa Gahlot for Scroll.in wrote "The show also captures the poignancy of small moments – Neelam suddenly noticing that her kids’ toothbrushes are still by the basin in the bathroom; a birthday cake being shoved into the arms of Shekhar; the stoic-looking Neelam exploding because she heard Shekhar humming."

Abhishek Srivastava of The Times of India praised Abhay Deol and Rajashri Deshpande's performance and wrote "The series' heart and soul, Rajshri Deshpande as Neelam Krishnamoorthy, delivers a gripping performance that will resonate for a very long time. She belts out a standout performance as a grieving mother who is driven to seek justice. She continues to take the lead, while her husband Shekhar, played by Abhay Deol, offers wonderful support."

Utkarsh Mishra for Rediff.com rated the series 3 out of 5 stars and wrote "The series seems to show that the Ansals were single-handedly responsible for the tragedy (no wonder they went to court seeking an injunction against its release). Other perpetrators, or 'villains' as the series calls them, get their comeuppance, or reach a point of regret."

Kartik Bhardwaj of The New Indian Express wrote "Abhay Deol finally gets a role deserving of his acting capabilities. His Shekhar, emanates hopelessness and despondency in subtle actions, like brushing his teeth or standing in a beeline at a government office. His zeal to fight for justice is fading out as the years pass and he is becoming someone just yearning for an escape."

Pratikshya Mishra of The Quint wrote "While the show does suffer in pacing towards the end, sometimes spending too long on an arc, Trial By Fire is one of the best examples of telling such a story."

Shubham Kulkarni of Koimoi rated the series 3.5/5 and wrote "Trial By Fire is difficult to watch if you are sensitive but a very important conversation. Do not give this a miss because it isn’t just a show."

The series currently holds a 100% Rotten Tomatoes rating.

== Accolades ==
Year	Award ceremony	Category	Nominee / work	Result	Ref.
2023	Filmfare OTT Awards	Best Drama Series	Trial by Fire	Nominated	
2023	Filmfare OTT Awards	Best Series (Critics)	Trial by Fire	Won	
2023	Filmfare OTT Awards	Best Director in a Drama Series	Prashant Nair	Nominated	
2023	Filmfare OTT Awards	Best Actor in a Drama Series	Abhay Deol	Nominated	
2023	Filmfare OTT Awards	Best Actress in a Drama Series	Rajshri Deshpande	Won	
2023	Filmfare OTT Awards	Best VFX (Series)	Deepak Bhatia, Prashant Thakur	Nominated	
2023	Filmfare OTT Awards	Best Editing (Series)	Xavier Box, Dániel Hajnal	Nominated	
