= Joanne Mitchell =

English film, stage and TV actress

- Born: 30 July 1971 (age 55); London, England
- Occupations: Actress, Director, Producer
- Years active: 1995–present
- Spouse: Dominic Brunt (m. 2003)
- Website: mitchell-bruntfilms.com www.joanne-mitchell.com

Joanne Mitchell (born 30 July 1971) is an English actress, director, and producer. In 2011 she co-founded Mitchell Brunt Films with husband and Emmerdale colleague Dominic Brunt and has worked as producer, writer, and/or director on several of the company's films.

== Career ==
Mitchell trained at The Bristol Old Vic Theatre School, where she met future husband Dominic Brunt. After graduating she embarked on a varied career in theatre and TV, including four roles in TV soap Emmerdale. Mitchell's theatrical roles have included Macbeth's Lady McDuff, Hermia in A Midsummer Night's Dream and Rosaline in Love's Labours Lost. She has also played Valerie in Conor McPherson's The Weir and Jenny in Alan Ayckbourn's Family Circles.

Since forming Mitchell-Brunt Films, Mitchell has expressed a desire to push boundaries and to merge drama and horror in unique ways. She wrote and produced four short films The Mighty Witch Killers of Pendle Hill, Shell Shocked, Sybil, The Outing - the latter two she also Directed. She then co-starred in the claustrophobic chiller White Settlers (2014) and the Manchester-set Habit (2016). She conceived, produced and starred in the zombie drama Before Dawn (2013) and 'female revenge' thriller Bait (2015).She also produced Attack of the Adult Babies, Evie and Wolf Manor (aka Scream of The Wolf). Her first directed feature film, Broken Bird, was released in 2024.

== Emmerdale ==
Mitchell has had four roles in Emmerdale. Her first in the long-running rural soap was in 2003, when she played DS Karen Barnborough in two episodes. She had further roles as Midwife Yeo and Susan Davies and, in 2016, took over the role of Sandra Flaherty.

== Filmography ==
Television
Programme	Episode	Role	Year	Notes
Justice	“There for the Grace of ...”	Jenny Woods	2011	
Coronation Street		Marsha Westbrook; Sonographer	2018; 2009	
Waterloo Road	Series 3 #6; Series 5 #7	TV Reporter; Mrs Turner	2007; 2009	
Doctors	"Scrub Away, Scrub Away" "Who Do You Think You're Kidding?" "Born Again"	Rosie Richardson; Carmen Perry; Josie Maray	2007; 2008; 2016	
A Touch of Frost	"Dead End"	Joan Atkins	2008	
Holby City	"Is There Something I Should Know?"	Heather	2007	
Bodies	Series 2 #6	Jo Lyons	2005	
Heartbeat	"Daniel"	Paediatric Nurse	2004	
Emmerdale	#17,434 onwards #15,291/94;#143,00/12 #13,492/94	Sandra Flaherty; Susan Davies; Midwife Yeo; DC Barnborough	2016; 2009; 2006; 2003	
Bad Girls	"Common Criminal"	Jude	2001	
The Maze House		Jo	2001	
Holding On	Series 1 #4	Caroline	2001	
Casualty	"Duty of Care"	Louise Austin	1995	

Film
Film	Role	Year	Notes
Licence to Live	Paula	1994	TV movie
The Way of the Monkey's Claw	Matka Draak	2011	
Shortcuts to Hell (Vol 1)	Hannah	2013	
Before Dawn	Meg/Writer/Producer	2013	
White Settlers	Flo	2014	
Bait	Dawn Greenwood	2015	
Porridge	Prosecuting Counsel	2016	
Habit	Katy	2016	
Pandora	Martha	2016	
Attack of the Adult Babies	Producer	2017	
Sybil	Director/Producer/Writer	2018	
Evie	Producer	2021	
Wolf Manor (Scream of the Wolf)	Producer	2022	
The Outing	Director/Producer	2022	
Broken Bird	Director/Writer	2024	

Theatre
Production	Role	Venue	Year	Notes
Alma and Gustav Mahler	Alma Mahler	Bridgewater Hall, Manchester		
A Sense of Justice	Millie	Perth Theatre	2005	
84 Charing Cross Road	Megan/Maxine	Nick Brooke No.1 Tour	2004	
The Weir	Valerie	Bolton Octagon	2004	
Fallen Angels	Jane	Salisbury Playhouse		
A Phoenix Too Frequent	Dynamene	Salisbury Playhouse		
Betrayal	Emma	Nick Brooke No.1 Tour		
Hamlet	Ophelia			
Hedda Gabler	Hedda Gabler			
The Weir	Valerie	Royal Court	1997	
Melonfarmer	Kathy	Plymouth Theatre Royal	2000	
Macbeth	Lady MacDuff	Orange Tree, Richmond		
Family Circles	Jenny	Orange Tree, Richmond	1996	
Romeo and Juliet	Juliet	Orange Tree, Richmond		
All In the Wrong	Belinda	Orange Tree, Richmond	1991	
Black Sea	Sarah	Paines Plough		
Jungle Book	Mother Wolf	The Swan Stratford		
Mansfield Park	Julia Bertram	The Redgrave		
Stags and Hens	Maureen	Edinburgh Festival		

Radio
Production	Role	Broadcaster	Year	Notes
Writing the Century II	Ada Reese	BBC Radio Four	2016	
Edward Elgar's The Crown of India	India	BBC Radio Three	2015	
The Treehouse	Clare	BBC Radio Four	2014	
Writing the Century I	Mrs Trim / Tracy Clarke	BBC Radio Four	2014	
The Testament of Jessie Lamb	Mum	BBC Radio Four	2013	
The Journey	Sophie	BBC Radio Four	2010	
Caesar Price Our Lord	Mum	BBC Radio Four	2008	
The Paston Letters	Joan / Alice / Emily	BBC Radio Four	2006	
On It	Jo	Woolly Back Productions		
