= Victor Banerjee =

Indian actor (born 1946)

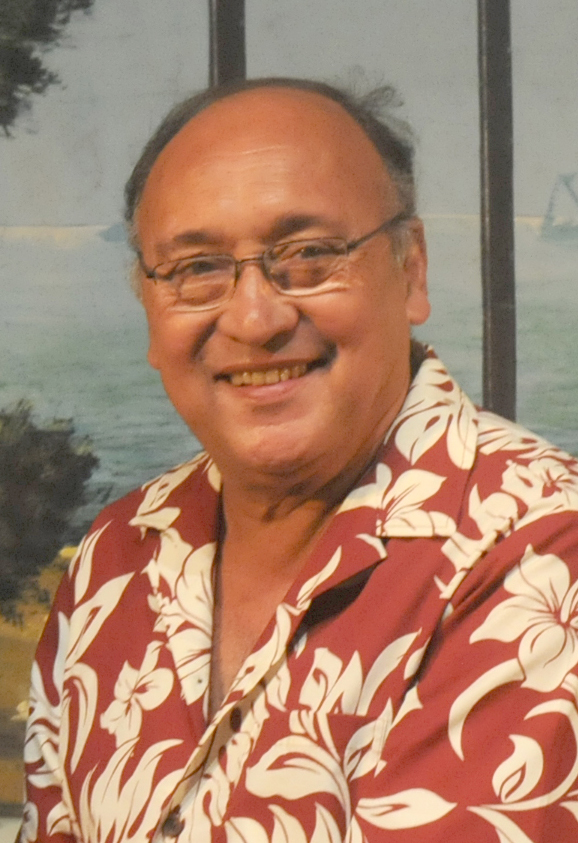
- Banerjee in 2013
- Born: 15 October 1946 (age 79); Jalalpur, Bengal Presidency, British India (present-day West Bengal, India)
- Occupation: Actor
- Years active: 1977–present
- Notable work: Full list
- Spouse: Maya Bhate Banerjee
- Children: 2
- Honors: National Board of Review Award for Best Actor (1984); Evening Standard British Film Award (1985); Padma Bhushan (2022)

Victor Banerjee (Bengali pronunciation: [bʱikʈɔɾ bɔnd̪opad̪ʱːae̯]; born 15 October 1946) is an Indian actor who has appeared in nearly 100 films in English, Hindi, Bengali, and Assamese cinema. He has worked with directors such as Roman Polanski, James Ivory, Sir David Lean, Jerry London, Ronald Neame, Satyajit Ray, Mrinal Sen and Shyam Benegal. He won the National Film Award for Best Supporting Actor for the film Ghare Baire. He was awarded the Padma Bhushan, India's third highest civilian award, in 2022 for his contribution to cinema by the Indian Government.

== Personal life ==
While in Calcutta, Banerjee performed in plays. He also performed during his time in Bombay.

=== Art aficionado ===
Banerjee established The Calcutta Art Gallery in the late 1970s. It claims to be the first commercial art gallery in the city.

== Film career ==
In 1984, Banerjee portrayed Dr. Aziz Ahmed in David Lean's film of A Passage to India, bringing him to the attention of western audiences.

He acted in Merchant Ivory Productions Hullabaloo Over Georgie and Bonnie's Pictures, Satyajit Ray's Shatranj Ke Khilari and Ghare Baire and in Mrinal Sen's Mahaprithivi.

He played role of God in the 1988 production of the York Mystery Plays, directed by Steven Pimlott. He was the first Asian to play a lead role in British Theatre.

== Awards and nominations ==
=== Civilian Awards ===
- 2022 — Padma Bhushan — India's third highest civilian award.

=== Film awards ===
Year	Award	Film	Category	Result	Ref.
1986	BAFTA Awards	A Passage to India	Best Actor in a Leading Role	Nominated	
1986	Bengal Film Journalists' Association Awards	Ghare Baire	Best Actor	Won	
1997	Bengal Film Journalists' Association Awards	Lathi	Best Actor	Won	
1985	Evening Standard British Film Awards	A Passage to India	Best Actor	Won	
1984	National Board of Review Awards	A Passage to India	Best Actor	Won	
1985	National Film Awards	Ghare Baire	Best Supporting Actor	Won	

== Political career ==
Banerjee unsuccessfully contested the 1991 Lok Sabha election in Calcutta North West from the Bharatiya Janata Party.

As an active member of the BJP, he was critical of Mulayam Singh Yadav's order to shoot the Karsevaks who had once climbed the Babri Masjid prior to its demolition.

He has been highly critical of what he called Navjot Singh Sidhu's pacifist attitude to terrorism exported from Pakistan.
