= Sumann =

- Suman Mishra
- Born: 24 December 1989 (age 36); Jamshedpur, Bihar (present-day Jharkhand), India
- Education: Sophia College for Women, Mumbai
- Occupations: Actress, Model, Dancer
- Years active: 2011 – present
- Height: 1.65 m (5 ft 5 in)
- Parent(s): Sushil Kumar Mishra (Father); Kamal Mishra (Mother)
- Relatives: Sheetal Mishra (Sister)
- Website: www.iamsumann.com (archived)

Sumann (earlier Suman Mishra, Jugnu Ishiqui ) (born 24 December 1989) is an Indian actress, model, singer and a dancer.

== Personal life ==
Sumann was born and brought up in Jamshedpur, Jharkhand. She completed her schooling from D.B.M.S. English School and her higher schooling from Motilal Nehru Public School. She completed her graduation from Sophia College for Women in Mumbai. Her father Sushil Kumar Mishra is a doctor. She has been practicing dance since the age of four and did her master's degree in Kathak dance.

== Career ==
Sumann started her career as modelling and came into limelight when she did a photoshoot with firecrackers on Diwali. She then appeared in the promotional song Saari Dhuniya Mere Ispe in the movie Loot. In 2013 she did an item song in Sillunu Oru Sandhippu.

She also worked as Tarla in Ammaa Ki Boli. Later she got recognition in the movie Crazy Cukkad Family, as Cherry produced by Prakash Jha. Sumann has attended Raosaheb Gurav's painting exhibition at Jehangir Art Gallery.

== Filmography ==
- Loot (2011) appeared in the promotional song "Saari Duniya Mere Ispe"
- Sillunu Oru Sandhippu (2013) Item song
- Ammaa Ki Boli (2013) as Tarla
- Crazy Cukkad Family (2015) as Cherry
- Bongu (2017)
