= Mahaakshay Chakraborty =

Indian actor (born 1984)

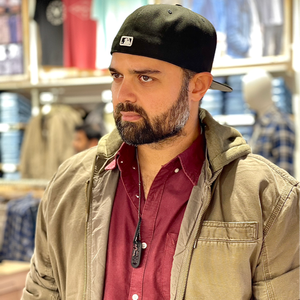
- Chakraborty in 2022
- Born: 30 July 1984 (age 42); Bombay, Maharashtra, India
- Education: New York Film Academy
- Occupation: Actor
- Years active: 2006–present
- Spouse: Madalsa Sharma (m. 2018)
- Parents: Mithun Chakraborty (father); Yogeeta Bali (mother)
- Relatives: See Chakraborty family

Mahaakshay Chakraborty (born 30 July 1984), also known as Mimoh Chakraborty and Mimoh, is an Indian actor who works in Hindi films. He is the son of actors Mithun Chakraborty and Yogeeta Bali.

== Early life ==
Chakraborty was born on 30 July 1984 in Bombay (now Mumbai) to actors Mithun Chakraborty and Yogeeta Bali. He has two brothers and a sister namely Ushmey Chakraborty, Namashi Chakraborty and Dishani Chakraborty.

== Career ==
Chakraborty debuted as "Mimoh" with a lead role in the 2008 film Jimmy, playing a DJ, who is falsely accused of murder, which leads him into the crime world. The film was directed by Raj N. Sippy and starred Rahul Dev, Shakti Kapoor and Vivana Singh in key roles. The film received only negative reviews from critics and audiences and it was declared a box-office bomb. Many viewers criticised acting skills of Mimoh. Film journalist Patchy N from Rediff.com wrote "In this day and age when debutants are well-groomed, trained in action, dance, and most importantly, dialogue, diction and acting, it's shocking that Mimoh Chakraborty looks so terribly unprepared".

His next two releases after Jimmy (2008) went unreleased namely He- The Only One (2010) and The Murderer- Hamilton Palace (2011). In the film He- The Only One, he was paired opposite Hansika Motwani.

In 2011, his first release was Haunted - 3D which was the first Indian stereo-scopic 3D horror film. The film received mixed reviews from critics and audiences and went onto become a commercial success. The Times of India while giving it three stars out of five stated "if the film works -- and it works quite well -- is only because of the special effects of the film. Experiencing the horror in 3D is indeed a novel experience for the viewer, specially since it is smartly done."

In his next release, Loot, he plays a boy-next-door, who has been taken to Pattaya to rob a house, although him and his crime-partners (Govinda, Suniel Shetty and Jaaved Jaffrey) end up looting the wrong house. Loot received mixed to negative reviews from most critics, and was a box office flop.

After Loot, he then starred in films like Rocky (2013), Enemmy (2013) and Ishqedarriyaan (2015). All three were critically and commercially failed at the box office. In 2021, he appeared in the biographical film Main Mulayam Singh Yadav. He portrayed the role of Shivpal Singh Yadav younger brother of Mulayam Singh Yadav.

He will be next seen in the thriller film titled Rosh which is directed by Jayeveer Panghaal and also stars Nikita Soni. He has also been roped in Nawazuddin Siddiqui starrer film Jogira Sara Ra Ra, directed by Kushan Nandy. The film also stars Sanjay Mishra and Neha Sharma in key roles.

== Personal life ==
In 2010, Indian gossip columnist Vicky Lalwani linked Chakraborty to actress Shama Sikander – a claim both parties denied. In July 2018, he married actress Madalsa Sharma.

Mahaakshay is an avid Battlefield and Call of Duty fan and regularly streams on Twitch under the alias meem0h.

In October 2020, Chakraborty and his mother Yogeeta Bali were booked in a rape case registered in Mumbai. A Bhojpuri actress accused Chakraborty of rape on the pretext of marriage, and a FIR was registered at the Oshiwara Police Station in Mumbai. Yogeeta Bali was accused of threatening the victim and forcing her to settle the case which was widely criticised and Mithun Chakraborty was accused of joining politics to get linency for his son and wife.

== Filmography ==
- All films are in Hindi, unless otherwise noted

Year	Title	Role	Notes
2008	Jimmy	DJ Jimmy	
2011	Haunted – 3D	Rehan Ahmed	
2011	Loot	Wilson	
2013	Rocky	Rocky	Bengali film
2013	Enemmy	CID Officer Maddy / Madhav Sinha	
2015	Ishqedarriyaan	Agam Diwan	
2017	Holy Smoke!	Max	Short film
2018	Tukkaa Fit	Vijay Khanna	
2018	Ab Mujhe Udhnaa Hai	Dance Teacher	Short film
2021	Main Mulayam Singh Yadav	Shiv Pal Yadav	
2023	Rosh	Rajat Khanna	
2023	Jogira Sara Ra Ra	Lallu Pandey	
2024	Pride		
2025	Oye Bhootni Ke		
2025	Nenekkadunna...?	Anand	Telugu film
2026	Haunted 3D: Echoes of the Past	Devadutt Choudhary / Dev	
2026	Public Kaa Hero	Vishva	

=== Television ===
Year	Title	Role	Network
2025	Khakee: The Bengal Chapter	Himel Majumder	Netflix
