= Tariq Khan (producer) =

Indian actor, producer, and television personality

- Born: 15 February 1982 (age 44); Poonch, Jammu and Kashmir, India
- Occupations: Film producer; television personality; actor
- Notable work: Am I Next; Country of Blind; Kaya Palat; Bioscopewala; Love in Vietnam
- Style: Hindi cinema
- Awards: KL Saigal Award (2023)

Tariq Khan (born 15 February 1982) is an Indian film producer, television personality and actor known for his work in Hindi cinema. He has made notable contributions to the industry with his involvement in films such as Am I Next, Country of Blind, Kaya Palat, Bioscopewala, Love in Vietnam, and Lihaaf.

== Biography ==
Tariq Khan was born on February 15, 1982, in Poonch, Jammu and Kashmir, India.

Khan began his career in film production and acting with a focus on showcasing diverse regional stories to a global audience. He gained prominence with several notable films, including the critically acclaimed Am I Next (2023) and the internationally recognized Country of Blind (2023). The latter was a film shot in Kashmir and featured Mir Sarwar. In Am I Next, which featured actress Anuskha Sen, Khan played a significant role both as a producer and actor, contributing notably to the film's success within the Hindi film industry.

In addition to his film work, Khan was involved in the production of notable projects such as Guilt 2 (2022) and Kaya Palat (2024), that were produced in collaboration with Satyen Bose and Rahhat Shah Kazmi.

Khan demonstrated a commitment to bring regional stories to the global audience with a vision for international cinema. Besides his work in film, Khan has been involved in supporting the community through the Starclub Social Welfare Society, a non-government organisation, where he has focused on awareness and support of the community.

== Filmography ==
Title	Language	Year	Role	Notes
Identity Card	Hindi	2014	Co-producer	
Mantostaan	Hindi	2017	Producer	
Rabbi	Hindi	2017	Producer	
Side A & Side B	Hindi	2018	Producer	
Million Dollar Nomad	Hindi	2018	Producer	
Delhi Bus	Hindi	2018	Producer	
2 Band Radio	Hindi	2019	Producer	
Lihaaf: The Quilt	Hindi	2019	Producer	
Wishlist	Hindi	2020	Producer	
Doorman	Hindi	2020	Producer	
Angithee	Hindi	2021	Producer	
Lines	Hindi	2021	Producer	
Cyanide	Hindi	2021	Producer	
Guilt 2	Hindi	2022	Producer	
Am I Next	Hindi	2023	Producer	
Dil kehke Bulaon	Hindi	2023	Producer	
Country of Blind	Hindi	2023	Producer	
Shakkar Masala	Hindi	2023	Producer	
Bed No 17	Hindi	2023	Co-producer	
Kaya Palat	Hindi	2024	Producer	
Scammy Boys	Hindi	2024	Producer	
Love in Vietnam	Hindi	2025	Producer	

== Awards and nominations ==
In 2023, Khan was awarded the KL Saigal Award for his significant contribution to the film industry.
