= Swanand Kirkire =

Indian musician and actor

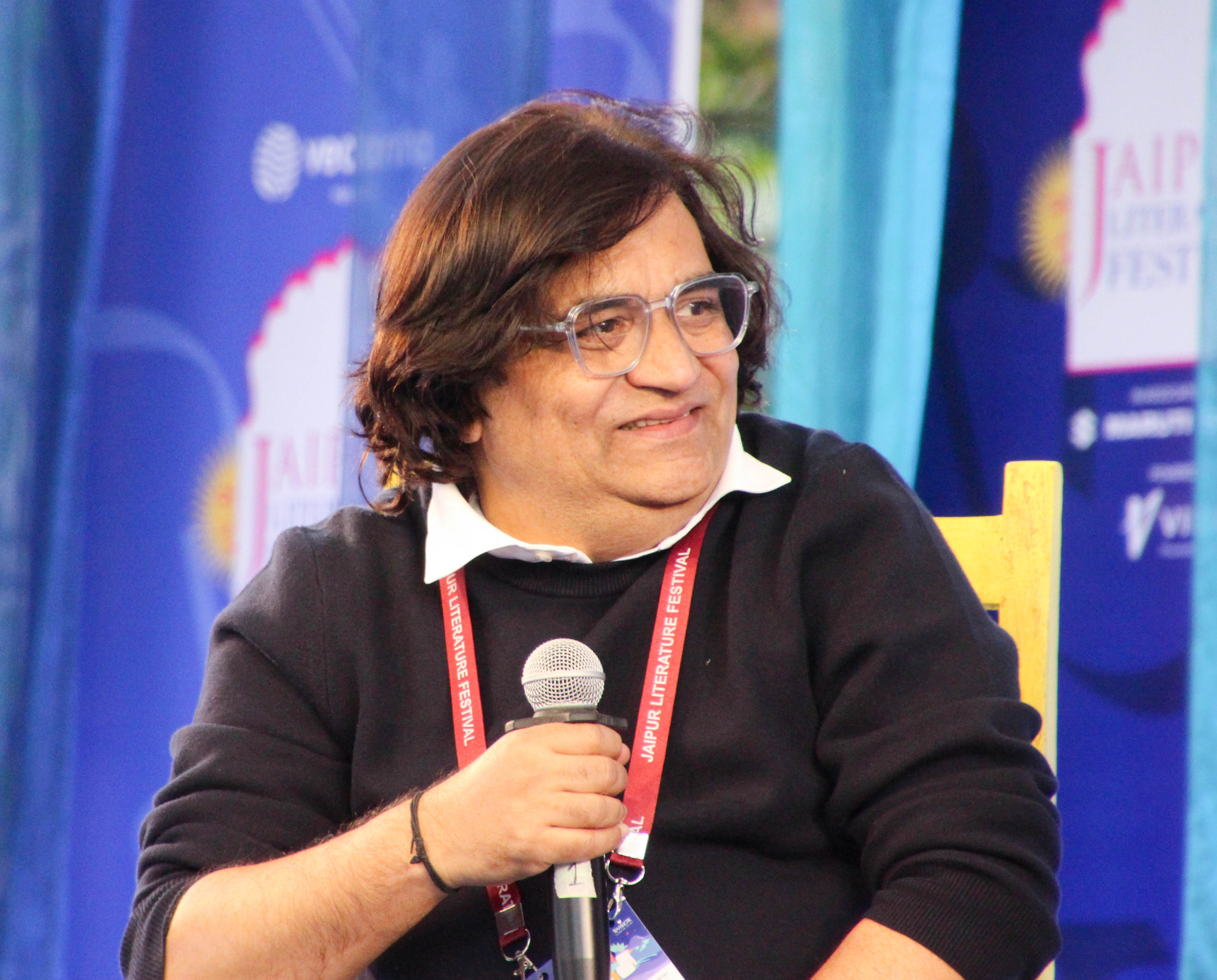
- Kirkire in 2025
- Born: 29 April 1970 (age 56); Indore, Madhya Pradesh, India
- Education: National School of Drama
- Occupations: lyricist, musician, screenwriter, actor, author
- Years active: 2003–Present
- Awards: National Film Award for Best Lyrics; National Film Award for Best Supporting Actor

Swanand Kirkire (born 29 April 1972) is an Indian lyricist, playback singer, writer, assistant director, actor and dialogue writer, who works in Marathi and Hindi film and television.

Kirkire won the National Film Award for Best Lyrics twice: first in 2006 for the song "Bande Me Tha Dum...Vande Mataram" from the film Lage Raho Munna Bhai, and then in 2009, for the song "Behti Hawa Sa Tha Woh" from the film 3 Idiots. He received Filmfare Award nomination for Best Lyrics for the song "Piyu Bole" in Parineeta (2005). In 2018, at the 66th National Film Awards he won the National Film Award for Best Supporting Actor for the Marathi film Chumbak. He made a cameo appearance as Sansad ji in Panchayat 3 and as Mansoor Khan Sahab in Qala to whose soundtrack he also contributed as a lyricist and singer.

== Early life and education ==
Swanand Kirkire was born and brought up at Rambagh in Indore-based Marathi speaking family to Chintamani (father) and Neelambari (mother), both of whom are classical singers. However, Swanand had no formal training in singing.

He moved to Delhi after graduating in commerce. In 1996, Swanand graduated from National School of Drama and started doing theatre. During his National School of Delhi days, his batchmates were Nawazuddin Siddiqui, Subrat Dutta and Chittaranjan Tripathy.

== Filmography ==
=== As lyricist ===
Year	Film	Notes
2003	Hazaaron Khwaishein Aisi	
2004	Lao Mehndiyan	Personnel album
2005	Kohinoor	
2005	Parineeta	
2005	Sehar	
2005	Kal: Yesterday and Tomorrow	
2006	Lage Raho Munna Bhai	National Film Award for Best Lyrics – 2006
2006	Kahan Se Aaye Badarva	
	Jai Santoshi Maa	
2007	Laaga Chunari Mein Daag	
2007	Khoya Khoya Chand	
2007	Eklavya: The Royal Guard	
2007	Johnny Gaddaar	
2007	Go	
2008	Welcome to Sajjanpur	
2009	3 Idiots	National Film Award for Best Lyrics – 2009
2009	Paa	
2010	Lafangey Parindey	
2010	Striker	One Song; 1) Maula Ajab Teri Karni Maula
2010	Well Done Abba	
2010	Enthiran	Robot – Hindi version
2010	Raajneeti	
2010	Peepli Live	
2011	Yeh Saali Zindagi	
2011	Singham	
2011	Bbuddah Hoga Terra Baap	
2011	Stand By	
2011	Balgandharva	Marathi film
2011	Deool	Marathi film
2011	The Dewarists	Episode 2 Kya Khayaal Hai
2012	Barfi!	
2012	English Vinglish	
2012	Vicky Donor	
2012	Oh My God	
2012	Bol Bachchan	
2012	Krishna Aur Kans	
2012	Paanch Adhyay	
2012	Ferrari Ki Sawaari	
2012	Gali Gali Chor Hai	
2012	Satyamev Jayate	Three songs 1) O Ri Chiraiya; 2) Sakhi; 3) Rupaiya
2012	Coke Studio Mtv Season 2	
2012	Jai Ambike	Personnel Album
2013	Kai Po Che!	
2013	Inkaar	
2013	Bombay Talkies	
2013	Maazii	Three Songs; 1) Zindagi; 2) Mora Jiya; 3) Maula
2014	Shaadi Ke Side Effects	
2014	Satyamev Jayate Season 2	One song 1) Kaun Madari Yahan Kaun Jhamura
2014	Bobby Jasoos	
2014	Singham Returns	
2014	Tera Mera Tedha Medha	
2014	Sonali Cable	One Song; 1) Sikkay
2014	Satyamev Jayate Season 3	Two songs 1) Khelen; 2) Maati
2014	Bhopal: A Prayer for Rain	One Song 1) Dhuan Dhuan
2014	PK	Four songs
2015	Shamitabh	
2015	Hunterrr	
2015	Parched	
2016	Fitoor	
2018	October	One Song; 1) Manwaa
2018	Helicopter Eela	Four songs 1) Mumma Ki Parchai; 2) Yadoon Ki Almari; 3) Dooba Dooba; 4) Khoya Ujaala
2019	Sye Raa Narasimha Reddy	For Hindi Dubbed Version - four songs 1) Jaago re Narasimha Jaagore; 2) Sandal mera mann 3) Sye Raa (Title Song); 4) Saansein Teri Desh Ha
2020	Tanhaji	One song 1) Mai Bhavani
2020	Raat Akeli Hai	One song 1) Jagoo
2020	Ludo	One song 1) Dil Julaha
2020	Haathi Mere Saathi	Three Songs 1) Shukriya 2) Dheeme Dheeme 3) Ae Hawa
2021	Madam Chief Minister	One Song 1) Chidi Chidi
2022	Chup: Revenge of the Artist	Two songs 1) Mera Love Main; 2) Gaya Gaya Gaya
2022	Qala	One song 1) Rubaaiyaan
2022	Goodbye	1) Jaikal Mahakal 2) Chann Pardesi 3) Maaye 4) Kanni re Kanni 5) Happy Birthday 6) Beautiful
2023	Lost	1) Nauka Doobi 2) Roshni 3) Mon Re 4) Zara Hat Ke
2023	Ghoomer	Two songs 1) Taqdeer Se; 2) Purnaviram
2023	Ganapath	One song 1) Lafda Kar Le
2023	12th Fail	1) Restart 2) Restart (Rap 'N' Folk)
2023	Laapataa Ladies	One song 1) Dheeme Dheeme
2023	Dunki	One Song; 1) Lutt Putt Gaya; Along with IP Singh
2023	Trial Period	One Song 1) Papa Superhero
	Pinky Beauty Parlour	One Song 1) Bandishen
2024	Singham Again	Three songs 1) "Jai Bajrangbali"; 2) "Singham Again – Title Track"; 3) "Lady Singham"
	Zero se Restart	One Song 1) Chal Khushiyon se Milte Hain
2025	Azaad	One song 1) Azaad Hai Tu; Along with Amitabh Bhattacharya
2025	Inspector Zende	1) Majhi Baygo 2) Charlie Baby
2026	Assi (film)	1) Maai Teri Yaad
2026	Bandwaale	1) Muqaabla (Side A) 2) Darr ki Cycle (Side A) 3) Machhri ko Pankh Laga Karr (Side A) 4) New Modern Band Anthem (Side A) 5) Train Stop (Side B) 6) Knock Knock (Side B) 7) Rebo Proposal Rap (Side B) 8) Tu mere Dil Mein Bus Ja

=== As playback singer ===
Year	Film	Songs	Notes
2003	Hazaaron Khwaishein Aisi	1) Bavra Mann; 2) Aye Sajni; 3) Qawwali – Mann Yeh Bavra; 4) Aye Sajni – The Club Mix	
2005	Kohinoor	Title Track	TV Serial One Song
2005	Parineeta	Raat Hamari Toh	
2005	Sehar	Palken Jhukao Na	
2007	Khoya Khoya Chand	Khoya Khoya Chand	
2007	Gulaal	Sheher	
2007	Eklavya: The Royal Guard	1) Janu Naa; 2) Suno Kahani	
2007	Laaga Chunari Mein Daag	Hum To Aise Hain	
2008	Uttaran	Uttaran Title Song	TV Serial One Song
2009	3 Idiots	1) Aal Izz well 2) Aal Izz well – Remix	
2010	Striker	Maula Ajab Teri Karni Maula	
2010	Well Done Abba	Hum Toh Apni Bawdi Lenge	
2010	Raajneeti	Ishq Barse	
2010	Deswa	Manwa Ke Maani	Bhojpuri movie
2011	Deool	1) Phoda Datta Naam Taho; 2) Tu Jhop Tujha Datta Jaga Aahe	Marathi movie
2011	The Dewarists	Kya Khayaal Hai	Episode 2
2012	Arjun: The Warrior Prince	Manva	
2012	Krishna Aur Kans	1) Advent of Krishna (Ayega Koi Ayega); 2) Natkhat Natkhat	
2012	Barfi!	Ala Barfi	Version 2
2012	English Vinglish	Navrai Majhi	
2012	Paanch Adhyay	Uda Jaaye	
2012	Satyamev Jayate	O Ri Chiraiya	
2012	Coke Studio Mtv Season 2	1) Lagi Lagi; 2) Pinjra	
2013	Inkaar	1) Darmiyan; 2) Maula Tu Malik Hai	
2013	Ammaa Ki Boli	Maa	
2013	Lootera	Monta Re	
2014	Satyamev Jayate (Season 2)	Kaun Madari Yahan Kaun Jhamura	
2014	Bhopal: A Prayer for Rain	Dhuan Dhuan	
2014	Crazy Cukkad Family	Chand Yeh	
2015	Masaan	Tu Kisi Rail Si	
2017	Hanuman: Da' Damdaar	The Maa Song	
2020	Raat Akeli Hai	Jaago	
2020	Serious Men	Raat Hai Kaala Chhata	
2022	Qala	1) Shauq; 2) Rubaaiyaan	
2023	Lost	1) Nauka Doobi 2) Roshni 3) Mon Re 4) Zara Hat Ke	
2023	12th Fail	1) Restart; 2) Restart (Rap 'N' Folk)	
2024	Coke Studio Bharat	1) Re Mann	
2025	Azaad	One song 1) Azaad Hai Tu; Along with Amitabh Bhattacharya	
2026	Bandwaale	1) Muqaabla (Side A) 2) Darr ki Cycle (Side A) 3) Machhri ko Pankh Laga Karr (Side A) 4) New Modern Band Anthem (Side A) 5) Train Stop (Side B) 6) Knock Knock (Side B) 7) Gubbare (Side B) 8) Rebo Proposal Rap (Side B) 9) Jiye to Jiye 10) Jiye to Jiye (Rishi Rich Mix) 11) Tu mere Dil Mein Bus Ja	

=== Singles ===
Year	Songs
2023	O re Mana
2023	Journey of Lifetime
2024	Shor Gul
2024	Meri Jaan (with Hansika Pareek)
2025	Chaand Aawara
2025	Mehfooz Rakh
2026	Aise Na Humko

=== As music director ===
Year	Film	Songs
2010	Striker	Maula Ajab Teri Karni Maula
2014	Bhopal: A Prayer for Rain	Dhuan Dhuan

=== As actor ===
Year	Film	Role	Notes
2003	Hazaaron Khwaishein Aisi	Villager	
2004	Chameli	Search party member	
2007	Eklavya: The Royal Guard	Havaldar Bablu	
2012	Maximum	Bachi Singh	
2013	Pune 52		
2014	Sonali Cable	Dattaram Tandel (Baba)	
2015	Crazy Cukkad Family	Pawan Beri	
2016	Irudhi Suttru/Saala Khadoos	Shopkeeper	
2017	Badrinath Ki Dulhania	Vaidehi's father	
2017	Mirza Juuliet	Rajan's father	
2017	Chumbak	Prasanna National Film Award for Best Supporting Actor	
2018	Beautiful World	Prasanna National Film Award for Best Supporting Actor	
2019	Bhai - Vyakti Ki Valli (part 1)	Kumar Gandharva	
2019	Bhai - Vyakti Ki Valli (part 2)	Kumar Gandharva	
2019	Girlz	Police officer	
2020	Ghoomketu	Guddan chacha	Released on ZEE5
2020	Raat Akeli Hai	Ramesh Chauhan	Released on Netflix
2020	Khaali Peeli	Choksi	
2021	Cash	Sanjay Gulati	
2022	Kiss	Salil Aabid	
2022	Qala	Mansoor Khan Sahab	Released on Netflix
2022	Zwigato	Govind Raj	
2023	The Tenant	Mr. Mishra	
2023	Three of Us	Dipankar Desai	
2025	Maalik	Balhar Singh	

=== Web series ===
Year	Title	Role	Platform	Notes
2019	Parchhayee - Ghost stories by Ruskin Bond	Peon Khatri	ZEE5	
2018	Table No. 5		ZEE5	
2019	The Verdict - State vs Nanavati	Justice R.M.Mishra	ALTBalaji and ZEE5	
2022	Code M - Season 2	DSP Ismail Qureshi	ALTBalaji	
2024-2025	Panchayat	Sansad Ji	Amazon Prime Video	Guest Star
2026	Bandwaale	Robo Kumar	Amazon Prime Video	

=== As dialogue writer ===
Year	Film	Notes
2004	Chameli	
2007	Eklavya: The Royal Guard	
2007	Sivaji	Dubbed Hindi Dialogues
2010	Enthiran	Dubbed Hindi Dialogues – known as "Robot" in Hindi
2014	Lingaa	Dubbed Hindi dialogues
2015	I	Dubbed Hindi dialogues

=== As associate director ===
Year	Film	Notes
2003	Hazaaron Khwaishein Aisi	
2003	Calcutta Mail	
2004	Chameli	

== Awards ==
Year	Category	Recording/Film	Result
National Film Awards
2006	Best Lyrics	"Bande Me Tha Dum..Vande Mataram" from Lage Raho Munna Bhai	Won
2009	Best Lyrics	"Behti Hawa Sa Tha Woh" from 3 Idiots	Won
2018	Best Supporting Actor	Chumbak	Won
Screen Awards
2013	Best Lyrics	"Maanjha" from Kai Po Che	Won
Mirchi Music Awards
2012	Album of The Year	Barfi!	Nominated
2012	Indie Pop Song of the Year	"Chiraiyya"	Nominated
