= Country of Blind =

2023 Indian Hindi-English film, based on H. G. Wells

- Directed by: Rahhat Shah Kazmi
- Written by: Rahhat Shah Kazmi
- Story by: Based on the 1904 story by H. G. Wells
- Produced by: Rahhat Shah Kazmi and Tariq Khan
- Starring: Hina Khan; Shoib Nikash Shah; Ahmer Haider; Inaamulhaq; Anushka Sen; Pradhuman Singh; Namita Lal; Mir Sarwar; Hussein Khan; Jitendra Rai; Farhana Bhat; Yulian Caesar
- Production companies: Assad Motion PicturesHiro"s Faar Better Films, Rahat Kazmi Film Studios, Tariq Khan Production
- Release date: 6 October 2023
- Country: India
- Languages: Hindi, English

Country of Blind is a 2023 Indian film in Hindi and English, directed and written by Rahhat Shah Kazmi. The film features a cast including Hina Khan, Mir Sarwar, Anushka Sen, Ahmer Haider and others. It is based on the 1904 story of the same name by H. G. Wells. The film gained significant attention and was one of three Indian films considered for the 2024 Academy Award nominations (Oscars 2024).

== Plot ==
The film follows Abhimanyu, an expert mountaineer, who falls into a remote and isolated society inhabited by blind people. This society has existed for fifteen generations, cut off from the rest of the world. Abhimanyu attempts to use his advantage as a sighted person to gain control, but his efforts lead to unexpected consequences, resulting in his entrapment.

== Cast ==
- Hina Khan as Gosha
- Shoib Nikash Shah as Abhimanyu
- Ahmer Haider as Vishwa
- Inaamulhaq as Paras
- Anushka Sen as Nandini
- Pradhuman Singh as Rajan
- Namita Lal as Mayatri
- Mir Sarwar as Ved Ji
- Hussein Khan as Guru Ji
- Jitendra Rai as Raghuraj
- Farrhana Bhatt as Rameshwari
- Yulian Caesar as The Mountaineer
- Rahhat Shah Kazmi as Old Man (credited as Rahat Kazmi)

== Release ==
The film was released in the USA on 6 October 2023. It received international praise for its storytelling and production quality.

== Reception ==
Outlook India reviewed the film, highlighting Hina Khan's earnest performance but critiquing the screenplay as lackluster.

== Notable Achievements ==
Hina Khan celebrated the inclusion of Country of Blind in the Oscars 2024 consideration list, expressing pride and excitement. The actress highlighted the film's achievement alongside other notable films like '2018' and '12th Fail,' marking a significant milestone for Indian cinema on the global stage.
