= Jaya Ojha =

Indian actress and singer

- Born: Jaya Ojha; Sri Ganganagar, Rajasthan, India
- Occupation: Actress
- Years active: 1989–present
- Spouse: Udbhav Ojha

Jaya Ojha is an Indian actress and singer known for her work in Indian soap operas. She is known for her role as Mandodari in the 2000s epic TV series Ramayan. She played a supporting role in the long-running soap opera Saath Nibhaana Saathiya on channel Star Plus. She played the role of Malti in Badho Bahu.

== Career ==
Jaya went to school in Jaipur and during her studies, she developed an interest in music and acting. She completed her master's in Hindustani vocal music. While completing her studies in the early 1990s, she worked in a number of TV shows, including The Sword of Tipu Sultan and The Great Maratha, as well as performing in theatre. After getting married, she moved to Mumbai and took a break from her professional career in order to focus on her family. She made a comeback in 2005 and joined a theatre group called Yatri and continued to work on more stage projects. She then progressed to television, and was signed for shows like Lucky and Kumkum. Her first breakthrough roles were playing Mandodari in the epic drama Ramayan, and a major role in the sitcom Angrezi Mein Kehte Hain. In 2013, she joined the long-running soap opera Saath Nibhaana Saathiya, where she held the supporting role of Madhu. Her recent work was in &TV's popular sitcom Badho Bahu.

== Filmography ==
List of film or television appearances, with year, title, and role shown
Year	Series	Role	Notes
1989	Indradhanush		
1990–91	The Sword of Tipu Sultan		Historical drama based on Tipu Sultan
1993	The Great Maratha		Historical drama based on Mahadaji Shinde
2005	Sai Baba	Unknown	7 episodes Based on the life of Shirdi Sai Baba
2006	Kumkum	Chaya Sangya	Cameo
2006–09	Lucky		
2008	C.I.D.		Episodic role
2008–09	Angrezi Mein Kehte Hain	Rukhsana	First lead role
2008–09	Ramayan	Mandodari	Parallel lead role
2008–09	Main Kab Saas Banoongi		
2010–11	Yeh Ishq Haaye	Seema Chaturvedi	
2011–13, 2014, 2016	Sasural Simar Ka	Meena Dwivedi	
2011–13	Dil Se Di Dua... Saubhagyavati Bhava?	Uma Sharma	
2012	Mrs. Kaushik Ki Paanch Bahuein	Mrs. Sharma	Guest appearance
2013–16	Saath Nibhaana Saathiya	Madhu Kapadia	Supporting role
2014	Piya Basanti Re	Geeta Patel	Cameo
2016–2018	Badho Bahu	Malati Singh Ahlawat	
2020–2022	Tera Yaar Hoon Main	Sushma Pratap Bansal	
2022	Gud Se Meetha Ishq	Sonia Jaydeep Khurana	
2022–2023	Palkon Ki Chhaon Mein 2	Surabhi Mithilesh Jha	
2024	Krishna Mohini	Rajshree Mehta	
