= Jimmy (2008 film) =

- Directed by: Raj N. Sippy
- Written by: Ranbir Pushp
- Story by: Mahima Kaushal (story idea)
- Produced by: Nawman Malik, Salman Malik
- Starring: Mimoh Chakraborty; Vivana Singh; Rahul Dev; Prithvi; Vikas Anand
- Cinematography: S. Pappu
- Edited by: Prashant Khedekar, Vinod Nayak
- Music by: Anand Raj Anand, Bappa Lahiri
- Production company: High Definition Motion Pictures
- Release date: 9 May 2008
- Running time: 115 minutes
- Country: India
- Language: Hindi
- Budget: ₹9 crore
- Box office: ₹1.86 crore

Jimmy is a 2008 Indian Hindi-language action film directed by Raj N. Sippy. The film introduces the son of Mithun Chakraborty, Mimoh Chakraborty. This was the Bollywood debut of Mimoh Chakraborty with high expectations, but it was a box-office bomb. It was a remake of the 1974 movie Majboor.

== Plot ==
In this film, a young woman's body in cold blood is recovered by the assistant commissioner of police (Rahul Dev). All the clues (including a purse) where the girl's body was found point to Jimmy (Mimoh Chakraborty) as the killer. To everyone's surprise, including his girlfriend and mother, he confesses to the crime of killing Rithu Bhatnagar to Rahul Dev in the police station. An automobile mechanic by profession and a dance heartthrob of everyone by night, Jimmy works as a DJ in the local dance club to pay off the debts left behind by his late father. Jimmy owns up to the murder and is sentenced to death. Why would a young man on the threshold of life commit such a heinous crime? What is the real motive behind it? Only Jimmy knows the truth, and if he is not the murderer, then he knows who is. In a sudden twist of fate, Jimmy realizes in jail that he has been drawn into a vicious conspiracy. But it is too late... or is it? What follows is a spine-chilling suspense that unfolds in this fast-paced saga of crime, deceit and murder.

== Cast ==
- Mahakshay Chakraborty as Jasminder Kumar Pushp (DJ Jimmy)
- Vivana Singh as Megha
- Zulfi Syed as Rejected Person
- Adi Irani as Rajat Sharma
- Gargi Patel as Ms. Pushp
- Prithvi as Jimmy Father
- Vikas Anand as the Doctor Mohan Kumar
- Shakti Kapoor as Inspector Battu Singh Tobar Patialewala
- Rahul Dev as ACP Rajeshwar Vyas

== Reception ==
The film was panned by all critics and audiences and holds a rating of 1.7/10 on IMDb.

Upon recovering only 20% of its budget, the film turned out to be a box-office bomb.

== Music ==
1. "Yeh Meri Hai Daastaan" - Vijay Verma
2. "Marhaba Yeh Rab Mera Rooth Gaya" - Debojit Saha
3. "Jive Bulliya Te Aake Fariyad Nahi" - Anand Raj Anand
4. "Aaya Hoon, Dil Leke Aaya Hoon" - Kunal Ganjawala
5. "Why Not Jimmy" - Shaan, Suzanne D'Mello
6. "Do Minute Me De Diya Hai Dil" - Shaan, Suzanne D'Mello
7. "Jamaane Se Keh Do Na Hamko Sataaye" - Kailash Kher
