= Apna Time Bhi Aayega =

Indian television series

- Genre: Drama
- Written by: Dialogues; Manasvi Arya
- Screenplay by: Abhijeet Sinha; Tanya Sinha
- Story by: Abhijeet Sinha
- Creative director: Vidhi Tandon
- Starring: See below
- Music by: Isha Vedraj; Punit Dixit
- Opening theme: "Apna Time Bhi Aayega theme music"
- Country of origin: India
- Original language: Hindi
- No. of episodes: 297

Production
- Producer: Ved Raj
- Editors: Sanjay Kamla Singh; Vikas Jha
- Camera setup: Multi-camera
- Running time: 22 minutes
- Production company: Shoonya Square Productions

Original release
- Network: Zee TV
- Release: 20 October 2020 – 16 October 2021

Apna Time Bhi Aayega (transl. My time will also come) is an Indian Hindi-language television drama that aired on Zee TV. The show stars Fahmaan Khan, Megha Ray and Vivana Singh in the lead roles.

The show revolves around the life of Rani, an intelligent, ambitious village girl who aspires to become an engineer but is forced to work as a servant for the royal Rajawat family. Rajeshwari Singh Rajawat "Rani Sa" is the family's arrogant matriarch. Due to circumstances, Rani is forced to marry Veer, Rani Sa's son. Rani Sa initially does not accept her but eventually does.

Megha Ray replaced Anushka Sen, Vivana Singh replaced Tanaaz Irani in 2021. The series premiered on 20 October 2020 and was produced by Ved Raj, under the company Shoonya Square Productions. The show's final episode was telecast on 16 October 2021.

== Plot ==
Rani is an ambitious and naive girl from the village of Ballia who comes to Jaipur to fulfill her dream of becoming an engineer and meet her father, Ramadheer, who worked as the chief servant for the Rajawat family, a royal family in Jaipur. Rajeshwari Singh Rajawat "Rani Sa" is the arrogant matriarch of the family who demands perfection in everything. Ramadheer is arrested on the charge of driving a car over 4 people, while drunk. Rani is forced to quit her dreams and replace her father as the chief servant. She is also determined to prove him innocent and tries to bail him out but in vain. Later, it's revealed that Rani Sa is sore towards her adopted son, Veer, cause he was the son of Rani Sa's husband Digvijay, and another woman, with whom Digvijay had an affair with. Veer's marriage is fixed with a rich girl, Kiara, whom Rani Sa chose for him. Rani Sa's daughter, Nandini, is also soon to marry the prince of Gwalior, Jay, who wants to marry her only cause of her property and greed. He also has a mistress, Champa, who works as a servant for the Rajawats. Jay is expelled from the palace by Veer, when he tries to molest Rani. Soon, Rani discovers that Veer caused the accident and trapped her father.

To avenge his humiliation, Jay plays a scheme. He calls Rani and poses as an outsider who has got evidence in favour of Ramadheer. He asks Rani to meet him in a temple to get the evidence, a temple where only married women are allowed. Rani, who was unaware of this, visits the temple where Jay tries to molest her again. However, when Jay sees Veer in the temple, he runs away and locks both of them in a room. The temple priests discover Veer and Rani in the room and attempt to kill them for breaking the rules. In a bid to save Rani's life, Veer marries Rani. Rani Sa gets enraged and keeps creating rifts between Veer and Rani. The whole Rajawat family, including Veer, refuses to accept Rani. Rani Sa's son Vikram and Digvijay's mother Rajmata are the only ones in the family who support Rani. Rani Sa leaves the house in anger and sends her sister, Padmini, to humiliate and expel Rani.

Jay re-enters in the house and his alliance is again fixed with Nandini. Gradually, Rani wins the heart of everyone, including Padmini. Though Rani disliked Veer for trapping her father but still she helps him to expose Jay and throw him out, and protect Nandini from an unhappy marriage. Rani and Veer fall in love. Rani wishes to go to Ballia to fill the form of her exam and Veer agrees. Rani Sa returns and asks Veer to leave Rani permanently in Ballia. Veer and Rani reach Ballia where Veer is showered with love and king-like treatment by Rani's grandmother, which makes it difficult for him to leave Rani. Rani's bestfriend, Birju who was secretly in love with her, returns from Dubai and is heartbroken to see that Rani married Veer. Though Veer initially leaves Rani but returns to take her back when a group of village women assault and taunt her for her husband leaving her. When they return to Jaipur, Rani Sa pretends to have accepted Rani, to play the victim card in front of Veer. Rani gets busy with her father's case as it could even lead to his hanging, if proper steps aren't taken. Rani Sa creates several rifts between Veer and Rani. Kiara and Rani Sa's son, Vikram marry in a drunken state as Kiara visualizes Vikram as Veer. When they realize what happened, they both decide to forget this and part their ways. Out of guilt, Veer surrenders to the police and Ramadheer gets released. Rani Sa bails out Veer.

It's revealed that Rani Sa did the accident while Veer was only taking the blame of hers. Jay deceitfully records a confession of Rani Sa and gives it to the police. Soon, Rani Sa is arrested. Jay abducts Rani. After a series of events, Veer finds Rani in Goa where they reunite. Kiara loses her memory due to an injury and forgets the marriage of Veer and Rani. She starts treating Rani as her servant like before and makes her work. Rani Sa gets released from jail and comes to Goa. She decides to throw Rani out of Veer's life as she believes that Rani was the one to give evidence against her. Rani Sa makes Veer believe that Rani and Birju are having an affair. Veer pretends of marrying Kiara to hurt Rani. Rani Sa throws Rani out at night, but she returns with the help of an NGO woman and demands a huge sum of money from the Rajawats. Veer begs her to leave him alone and let him move on with his life and Kiara. Rani sadly leaves Goa and goes to Ballia. Veer follows her to Ballia, along with Kiara, to punish her mentally for betraying him. Soon, Veer learns Rani Sa's scheme and unites with Rani. They both return to Jaipur where Rani gets admitted in a college for further studies. Nandini marries Jay at Rani Sa's behest. Veer sees a mysterious patient at his hospital who is in a coma. Soon, it's revealed that the patient is none other than Veer's biological father, Ranvijay. Ranvijay is Digvijay's elder brother and Rani Sa's ex-husband who left her abruptly after their marriage, leaving her pregnant with Veer and worsening her health. Digvijay married Rani Sa and hid Veer on doctor's recommendation as it could worsen Rani Sa's health and remind her of Ranvijay.

Rani Sa apologizes to Veer for treating him like an outsider all these years but he gets angry on her. Ranvijay enters the house and starts plotting against Rani to kill her, when he sees that Rani wants Veer to unite with Rani Sa again. When Rani discovers this, Ranvijay confesses that he married someone else after leaving Rani Sa, and he never regretted for his actions and has returned to snatch Veer from everyone and take him away with him. Rani learns that Ranvijay has kidnapped Digvijay. Ranvijay pushes Rani off a building who is presumed to be dead by him. But Rani survives and enters the house, disguised as an old maidservant to expose Ranvijay. Meanwhile, Rani's uncle and his daughter, Kajri, too arrive there. Kajri gets impressed by Vikram's money and decides to marry him. When Ranvijay kidnaps Rani and tries to kill her, Veer saves her and Ranvijay is exposed. Rani Sa's step-sister, Vijaya, snatches Rajawats' property and throws them out of their house.

Vijaya's son, Suraj, falls in love with Rani on the road when she saves him from getting hit by a car. Rani enters the house as Suraj's tutor and helps the Rajawats to regain their property. Soon, Rani is exposed. Vijaya and Suraj kidnap Veer and make the whole Rajawat family their servants, except Rani. They force Rani to marry Suraj. However, on Rani and Suraj's wedding day, the police arrive and arrest Suraj and Vijaya. The Rajawats get their house and property back. Rani Sa finally accepts Rani. Jay gets exposed in front of everyone and Nandini leaves him for his abusive behaviour towards her. Jay gets arrested. Vikram and Kiara confess their love. Kajri gets angry and kidnaps Vikram and Kiara and tries to marry Vikram. However, Vikram and Kiara escape and fool Kajri. Kajri apologizes to everyone for her mistakes and they forgive her. Everyone attends the wedding where Veer-Rani and Vikram-Kiara remarry. Finally, Veer and Rani are reunited, and the show ends on a happy note.

== Cast ==
=== Main ===
- Anushka Sen/Megha Ray as Rani Singh Rajawat: Ramadheer's daughter; Pinku's sister; Veer's wife; Suraj's ex-fiancée (2020–2021)
- Fahmaan Khan as Dr. Veer Pratap "Veer" Singh Rajawat: Rajeshwari and Ranvijay's son; Digvijay's stepson; Nandini, Vikram and Devraj's half-brother; Rani's husband; Kiara's ex-fiancé (2020–2021)
- Tanaaz Irani/Vivana Singh as Rajeshwari "Rani Sa" Singh Rajawat: Matriarch of the Rajawat family; Digvijay's wife; Ranvijay's ex-wife; Veer, Nandini and Vikram's mother; Devraj's stepmother; Padmini's sister; Vijaya's half sister (2020–2021)

=== Recurring ===
- Pratish Vora as Ramadheer "Ramu" Singh: Former chief-servant at Rajawat Household; Suman's son; Rani and Pinku's father (2020–2021)
- Vivan Singh Rajput as Suraj Singh Shekhawat: Vijya's son; Rani's obsessive one-sided lover and ex-fiancé (2021)
- Sehrish Ali as Nandini Rajawat: Rajeshwari and Digvijay's daughter; Vikram's sister; Veer and Devraj's half-sister; Jay's wife (2020–2021)
- Pulkit Bangia as Advocate Vikram Pratap Singh Rajawat: Rajeshwari and Digvijay's son; Nandini's brother; Veer and Devraj's half-brother; Kiara's husband (2020–2021)
- Samaksh Sudi as Jay Singh Shekhawat: Malini's son; Nandini's husband (2020–2021)
- Yajuvendra Singh as Digvijay Singh Rajawat: Bhairavi's younger son; Ranvijay's brother; Kumud's ex-lover; Rajeshwari's husband; Devraj, Vikram and Nandini's father; Veer's adoptive father (2020–2021)
- Gargi Patel as Bhairavi "Rajmata" Singh Rajawat: Ranvijay and Digvijay's mother: Veer, Vikram and Nandini's grandmother (2020–2021)
- Priyal Shah as Kiara Raghuvanshi: Dev and Mrs. Raghuvanshi's daughter; Veer's ex-fiancée; Vikram's wife (2020–2021)
- Raymon Singh as Padmini Singh Shekhawat: Rajeshwari's sister; Vijaya's half sister; Nakul's widow (2020)
- Hiten Meghrajani as Arun Grover: A cook who liked Nandini secretly (2020–2021)
- Komal Sharma / Dolphin Dwivedi as Kumud Prajapati: Servant at Rajawat Household; Digvijay's ex- mistress; Devraj's mother; Veer's childhood governess (2020–2021)
- Karan Kaushal Sharma as Dev Raghuvanshi: Kiara's father; Mrs. Raghuvanshi's husband (2020–2021)
- Jigna Shastri as Mrs. Raghuvanshi: Kiara's mother; Dev's wife (2020)
- Akshita Arora as Suman Singh: Ramadheer's mother; Rani and Pinku's grandmother (2020–2021)
- Smita Dongre as Shanti Bajpai: Servant at Rajawat household (2020–2021)
- Sangeeta Kapure as Vijaya Singh Shekhawat: Rajeshwari and Padmini's half-sister; Suraj's mother (2021)
- Imran Khan as Ranvijay Singh Rajawat: Bhairavi's elder son; Veer's father; Digvijay's brother; Rajeshwari's ex-husband (2021)
- Neeraj Khetarpal as Mr. Singh "Mausa ji": Kajri's father (2021)
- Pratiksha Rai as Kajri Singh: Mr. Singh's daughter; Vikram's one-sided-lover (2021)
- Manisha Singh Chauhan as Preet: Rani's college friend (2021)
- Anjali Thakkar as Malini Singh Shekhawat: Jai's mother (2020)/(2021)
- Sangeeta Adhikari as Champa: Maidservant in the Rajawat household; Jay's mistress (2020–2021)
- Niklesh Rathore as Birju Bhayankar: Rani's childhood friend and one-sided lover (2020) (2021)
- Kavyansh as Pinku Singh: Ramadheer's son; Rani's brother (2020–2021)
- Unknown as Devraj Singh Rajawat: Digvijay and Kumud's illegitimate son; Rajeshwari's stepson; Nandini, Veer and Vikram's half-brother (2021)

== Production ==
Initially, Anushka Sen was cast for the role of Rani. She left the series three weeks after the launch claiming health issues while the producers cited that she was unprofessional and threw tantrums on the set. Anushka was replaced by Megha Ray. Tannaz Irani tested positive for COVID-19 but resumed shooting after she recovered. Megha Ray had tested positive for COVID-19 and she is staying at home quarantining. She eventually tested negative and she continued working. Tannaz Irani was replaced by Vivana Singh as Rajeshwari Singh Rajawat. Irani said, "It was a random call; they told me that I was required to shoot every day, as my character is pivotal. They went on to add that they have thought it through and since I can’t travel to Goa, they are replacing me. I am shocked and confused". The show telecasted its last episode on 16 October 2021.

== Soundtrack ==
Apna Time Bhi Aayega

Soundtrack album by Puneet Dixit
- Released: 7 September 2021
- Length: 10:36
- Label: Zee Music Company
External media
Audio
- OST on JioSaavn
Video
- "Apna Time Bhi Aayega" on YouTube
- "Rangrez Piya" on YouTube

Two music videos were released from the soundtrack. The first one was picturized on Anushka Sen, while second one contains different scenes from the drama featuring Megha Ray and Fahmaan Khan.

All music is composed by Puneet Dixit.

Original Soundtrack
No.	Title	Lyrics	Singer	Length
1.	"Apna Time Bhi Aayega"	Manasvi Arya	Amrit Rajasthani Harasar, Puneet Dixit	3:10
2.	"Rangrez Piya"	Abhendra Kumar Upadhyay	Rafiq Sagar, Esha Gaur, Puneet Dixit	7:26
Total length:				10:36
