= Sapnon Ki Chhalaang =

Indian drama television series

- Promotional poster
- Genre: Coming Of Age; Slice Of Life; Drama
- Starring: See Below
- Theme music composer: Kanishk Seth - Kavita Seth
- Opening theme: Hum Chote Chote Shehron Se
- Country of origin: India
- Original language: Hindi
- No. of episodes: 90

Production
- Producers: Herumb Khot; Nilanjana Purkayasstha
- Camera setup: Multi-camera
- Running time: 23 minutes
- Production company: Invictus T Mediaworks

Original release
- Network: Sony Entertainment Television; SonyLIV
- Release: 10 April – 11 August 2023

Sapnon Ki Chhalaang (transl. Leap of Dreams) is an Indian drama television series premiered on 10 April 2023 on Sony TV. Produced under Invictus T Mediaworks, it stars Megha Ray and Pulkit Bangia as the leads. The show concluded on August 11, 2023.

== Cast ==
=== Main ===
- Megha Ray as Radhika "Guddi" Yadav - Radhe Shyam and Suman's daughter; Pintu's elder sister; Abhishek's love interest (2023)
- Pulkit Bangia as Abhishek "Rinku" Saxena – Pradeep and Vrinda's son; Kritika's elder brother; Radhika's neighbour (2023)

=== Recurring ===
- Mohini Sapnani as Taanya - Abhishek's ex girlfriend (2023)
- Neel Motwani as Hrithik – Radhika's suitor and office senior (2023)
- Sadhwi Majumder as Sreemoyee Banerjee – Radhika's flatmate and best friend (2023)
- Alma Hussein as Preeti – Baldev's ex-wife; Radhika's flatmate and best friend (2023)
- Anusubdha Bhagat as Vaishali Tiwari – Radhika's flatmate and friend (2023)
- Kashish Duggal as Suman Yadav – Radhe Shyam's wife; Radhika and Pintu's mother (2023)
- Sanjeev Jotangia as Radhe Shyam Yadav – Suman's husband; Radhika and Pintu's father (2023)
- Benaf Dadachandji as Priyal – Radhika's boss (2023)
- Haresh Sharma as Jayaram Yadav – Gomti's husband, Radhika's uncle, Lucky and Lavi's father, Radhe Shyam's elder brother (2023)
- Varsha Dhagat as Gomti Yadav – Jayaram's wife, Radhika's aunt, Lucky and Lavi's mother (2023)
- Manas Adhiya as Lavi – Radhika's elder cousin brother. Lucky's younger brother. Gomti and Jayaram's younger son, Mili's husband (2023)
- Bhavya Nil Shinde as Lucky – Radhika's elder cousin brother. Lavi's elder brother. Gomti and Jayaram's older son (2023)
- Kartavya Upadhyay as Pintu – Radhika's younger brother (2023)
- Lata Shukla as Radhika, Lucky, Lavi and Pintu's grandmother (2023)
- Sanjeev Singh Rathore as Pradeep Saxena – Radhika's neighbour, Abhishek (Rinku's) father, Kritika (Kittu's) father. (2023)
- Pyumori Mehta Ghosh as Vrinda Saxena – Abhishek (Rinku) and Kritika (Kittu's) mother, Radhika's neighbour and guide. (2023)
- Kajal Pahuja as Kritika Saxena (Kittu) – Abhishek's sister and Radhika's neighbour (2023)
- Gulshan Shivani as Baldev Dhingra – Preeti's ex-Husband (2023)
- Rushad Rana as Rajesh Nayak – CEO of ACS 360 (2023)
- Krishna Shetty as Veer Shetty
- Devanggana Chauhan as Jasmine 'Jazz' (2023)
- Dipti Joshi as Mrs Taluskar – Radhika's society secretary (2023)
- Priyanka Mishra as Mili, Lavi's wife (2023)
- Ashima Chauhaan as Alisha – Radhika's colleague (2023)
- Ameya Edvankar as Kartik Nemlekar – Radhika's colleague and rival (2023)
- Snehal Waghmare as Samiksha – Radhika's colleague (2023)
- Navein Singh as Zeeshan – Radhika's colleague (2023)
- Kishan Raitani as Alex – Radhika's colleague (2023)
- Shubham Vyas as Manish – Radhika's colleague (2023)

== Production ==
=== Development ===
In January 2023, the series was announced by Invictus T Mediaworks for Sony Entertainment Television. Initially titled "Chhalaang Sapno Ki", later changed and launched with the title "Sapnon Ki Chhalaang".

=== Filming and casting ===
Principal photography commenced in Mumbai, with Megha Ray, Benaf Dadachandji and Alma Hussein joining the cast. The series marks the second collaboration between Benaf Dadachandji and Alma Hussein with Invictus T Mediaworks after Dhadkan Zindaggi Kii (2021).

=== Release ===
The first promo of the show was unveiled on 26 February 2023, featuring the protagonists.

== See also ==
- List of programs broadcast by Sony Entertainment Television
