= Krishna Mohini =

Indian drama television series

- Genre: Romance; Drama; Social issue
- Created by: Pawandeep Kaur
- Screenplay by: Divya Nayyar
- Directed by: Vinod Rautela; Sanjay Satavase; Maanish Singh
- Starring: See below
- Country of origin: India
- Original language: Hindi
- No. of seasons: 1
- No. of episodes: 99

Production
- Producers: Sushanta Das; Gurjit Singh; Surinder Singh
- Cinematography: Indranil Singha
- Camera setup: Multi-camera
- Running time: 22 minutes
- Production company: Boyhood Productions

Original release
- Network: Colors TV
- Release: 29 April – 5 August 2024

Krishna Mohini is an Indian Hindi-language television drama series that premiered from 29 April 2024 to 5 August 2024 on Colors TV and streams on JioCinema. Produced by Sushanta Das under Boyhood Productions, it stars Debattama Saha, Ketaki Kulkarni, Fahmaan Khan and Mohit K Sachdeva. It was replaced by Megha Barsenge in its time slot.

== Plot ==
As the sole breadwinner of her family, gifted 21-year-old singer Krishna sets out on a journey to support her younger sibling, struggling with gender identity in the face of life's challenges and societal norms. Later, it is revealed that Mohini, formerly Mohan, has transitioned both socially and physically into a transgender woman.

== Cast ==
=== Main ===
- Debattama Saha as Krishna Joshi Mehta: Bansi and Kaushalya's daughter; Mohini's sister; Shailesh's cousin; Aryaman's wife; Bharat and Rajshree's daughter-in-law; Anshuman and Meghna's sister-in-law; Mohana's mother (2024)
- Ketaki Kulkarni as
  - Mohan Joshi: Bansi and Kaushalya's son; Krishna brother; Shailesh's cousin (2024) (before transition)
  - Mohini Joshi Thakkar: Bansi and Kaushalya's daughter; Krishna's sister; Shailesh's cousin; Siddharth's wife; Kundan and Srijila's daughter-in-law; Ananya and Piya's sister-in-law (2024) (after transition)
- Fahmaan Khan as Aryaman "Arya" Mehta: Bharat and Rajshree's son; Anshuman and Meghna's brother; Krishna's husband; Bansi and Kaushalya's son-in-law; Mohini's brother-in-law; Mohana's father (2024)
- Mohit K Sachdeva as Siddharth "Sid" Thakkar: Kundan and Srijila's son; Ananya and Piya's brother; Dayawanti's grandson; Mohini's husband; Bansi and Kaushalya's son-in-law; Krishna's brother-in-law (2024)

=== Recurring ===
==== Joshi family ====
- Faiz Mohammed Khan as Bansi Joshi: Kaushalya's husband; Krishna and Mohini's father; Aryaman and Siddharth's father-in-law; Mohana's grandfather (2024)
- Atin Taneja as Shailesh Joshi: Bansi and Kaushalya's nephew; Krishna and Mohini's cousin; Mohana's uncle; Kumud's husband (2024)
- Preeti Singh as Kumud Joshi: Shailesh's wife (2024)
- Yogeshraj Bedi as Krishna foster's brother: Ratna's husband (2024)
- Kajal Rathore as Ratna Joshi: Krishna's bestfriend and sister–in–law (2024)

==== Mehta family ====
- Jaya Ojha as Rajshree Mehta: Bharat's wife; Aryaman, Anshuman and Meghna's mother; Krishna and Esha's mother-in-law; Mohana's grandmother (2024)
- Abhishek Soni as Anshuman Mehta: Bharat and Rajshree's son; Aryaman and Meghna's brother; Esha's husband (2024)
- Sejal Jaiswal as Esha Mehta: Anshuman's wife; Bansi and Rajshree's daughter-in-law; Aryaman and Meghna's sister-in-law (2024)
- Priyanjali Uniyal as Meghna Mehta: Bharat and Rajshree's daughter; Aryaman and Anshuman's sister (2024)

==== Thakkar family ====
- Farida Patel Venkat / Farida Dadi as Dayawanti Thakkar: Kundan's mother; Srijila's mother-in-law; Siddharth, Ananya and Piya's grandmother (2024)
- Naveen Saini as Kundan Thakkar: Dayawanti's son; Srijila's husband; Siddharth, Ananya and Piya's father; Mohini's father-in-law (2024)
- Ashita Dhawan as Srijila Thakkar: Kundan's wife, Siddharth, Ananya and Piya's mother; Mohini's mother-in-law (2024)
- Anoushka Chauhan as Ananya Thakkar: Kundan and Srijila's daughter; Siddharth and Piya's sister; Dayawanti's granddaughter (2024)
- Apeksha Malviya as Piya Thakkar: Kundan and Srijila's daughter; Siddharth and Ananya's sister; Dayawanti's granddaughter (2024)

==== Others ====
- Himanshu Awasthi as Ketan: Aryaman's assistant (2024)
- Navya Singh as Anuradha: A Professor; Mohini's teacher (2024)

== Production ==
=== Development ===
The show tackles the social issue by showcasing gender identity as problems faced by trans gender and received both positive comments and negative feedback.

=== Casting ===
Fahmaan Khan and Debattama Saha were roped to play the leads as Krishna Joshi and Aryaman Mehta respectively. Ketaki Kulkani was cast in a LGBTQ role. Sejal Jaiswal joined the show as Esha Mehta, a fashion designer. Anoushka Chauhan was cast as Ananya.

=== Release ===
The first promo was released in May 2024. The show premiered on 29 April at 7 p.m. slot. The final shooting of the series wrapped up on 30 June 2024.
