= Waaris (2016 TV series) =

Indian television series

- Show Poster
- Genre: Social drama thriller
- Created by: Devyani Rale; Ashvini Yardi
- Written by: Devyani Rale; S. Manasvi; Malvika Asthana; Pranjal Saxena; Nikhil Vaddiboina; Nishikant Roy
- Directed by: Tabrez khan
- Creative director: Niraj Kumar Mishra
- Starring: Sania Touqeer; Wahib Kapadia; Farnaz Shetty; Neel Motwani
- Theme music composer: Ashish Rego and Saurabh Kalsi
- Opening theme: Waaris
- Country of origin: India
- Original language: Hindi
- No. of seasons: 1
- No. of episodes: 404

Production
- Producers: Ashvini Yardi; Devyani Rale
- Production locations: Mumbai, India
- Camera setup: Single-camera
- Running time: 20 minutes approx.
- Production company: Viniyard Films

Original release
- Network: &TV
- Release: 16 May 2016 – 1 December 2017

Waaris (English: The Heir) is an Indian Hindi drama television series based on the practice of Bacha posh and broadcast on &TV from 16 May 2016 to 1 December 2017. The title track has been sung by the Nooran Sisters. It stars Farnaz Shetty and Neel Motwani.

== Premise ==
Amba Pawania, a Punjabi mother, is forced to raise her third daughter Manpreet as a boy in efforts to keep peace in the village and prevent her violent younger brother of her husband- Jagan from taking the leadership position, but in process of hiding the identity of Manpreet she faces many challenges.

== Plot ==
Deena tells Amba that if her third daughter is born, she will kill her baby. As Amba unfortunately delivers a daughter, she lies that she is her son and raises her as a boy, becoming a protective mother for him due to the gender inequality.

=== 7 years later ===
Amba has brought Manpreet up as Mannu to keep Charan's title and doesn't want Jagan to become the village leader. Manpreet tends to prefer feminine things like Simmi and Gunjan. Simmi learns of her truth and supports Amba. Manpreet befriends the handicapped Raj, who is neglected by Harjeet. Although rivals, the Pawanias and Bajwas work together to bring peace in village. Simmi is pregnant with Raman's child. Mohini secretly shoots Raman; Harjeet shoots Simmi. Bajwas think Manpreet shot Raman. Her and Raj's friendship breaks; he and Amrit leave the Bajwa family.

=== 10 years later ===
Raj returns and falls for the grown-up Manpreet unaware she is Mannu. Harjeet has married Mohini. Raj learns Manpreet's truth and they marry. He reveals it was a plan to avenge Raman's death, but she enters the Bajwa mansion. Alive and kidnapped by Amba, Simmi is mentally unstable. Rohan finds her. Mohini is afraid as Simmi knows she killed Raman. Raj realises he really loves Manpreet. Mohini is exposed to have killed Raman, and gets arrested. Simmi is secretly married off to Rohan and regains her memory. Raj helps Manpreet in making Amba the leader of Pawanias. The two and Simran-Rohan remarry.

=== 6 years later ===
Raj and Manpreet have two children, Payal and Rakshit. Simmi and Rohan are parents to Mahima and Aarav. Manpreet teaches them that there's no difference between men and women.

== Cast ==
=== Main ===
- Arti Singh as Amba Kaur Dhillon / Amba Charan Pawania: Patriach of Pawania family - Charan's widow; Simran, Gunjan and Manpreet's mother (2016–2017)
- Farnaz Shetty as Manpreet Pawania Bajwa a.k.a. Preet / Mannu :Amba and Charan's younger daughter; Simran and Gunjan's sister; Raj's childhood friend turned wife; Payal and Rakshit's mother (2017)
  - Saniya Touqeer as Young Manpreet Pawania / Mannu : (2016–2017)
- Neel Motwani as Rajveer "Raj" Bajwa :Harjeet and Amrit's youngest son; Raman and Rohan's younger brother; Manpreet's childhood friend turned husband; Payal and Rakshit's father (2017)
  - Wahib Kapadia as Young Rajveer "Raj" Bajwa (2016–2017)

=== Pawania family ===
- Sucheta Shivkumar as Deena Pawania :Patriarch of Pawania family: Charan and Jagan's mother; Simran, Gunjan, Manpreet Sukhi and Babbly's grandmother (2016)(Dead)
- Mohammed Iqbal Khan as Charan Pawania; Deena's elder son; Jagan's elder brother; Amba's husband; Simran, Gunjan and Manpreet's father (2016)(Dead)
- Akshay Dogra as Jagan Pawania: Deena's younger son; Charan's younger brother; Raavi's husband; Babbly and Sukhi's father (2016–2017)
- Kaivalya Chheda as Sukhveer "Sukhi" Pawania; Raavi and Jagan's elder son; Babbly's elder brother (2017)
  - Sneh Mirani as young Sukhveer Pawania (2016–2017)
- Swati Bajpai as Raavi Kaur Chaddha / Raavi Jagan Pawania:Jagan's wife; Babbly and Sukhi's mother (2016–2017)
- Unknown as Babbly Pawania; Raavi and Jagan's younger daughter; Sukhi's younger sister (2017)

=== Bajwa family ===
- Anand Suryavanshi as Harjeet Bajwa : Patriarch of Bajwa family, Swaroop's brother, Amrit and Mohini's husband; Raman, Rohan and Raj father (2016–2017)
- Jaswir Kaur as Mohini Bajwa(Jadhav) Harjeet's second wife; Nihaal's and Pami mother; Raj, Raman and Rohan's step-mother; Raman's murderer (2017)
- Yatin Mehta as Raman Bajwa; Amrit and Harjeet's elder son; Rohan and Raj's brother; Simran's first husband (2016–2017)(Dead)
- Farhina Parvez as Simran "Simmi" Bajwa (Pawania) : Amba and Charan's elder daughter;Gunjan and Manpreet's elder sister; Raman's widow, Rohan's second wife; Mahima and Aarav's mother (2016–2017)
- Sanket Choukse as Rohan Bajwa: Amrit and Harjeet's second son; Raman and Raj's brother; Simran's second husband; Mahima and Aarav's father(2017)
  - Viraj Kapoor as Young Rohan Bajwa (2016–2017)
- Vandana Lalwani as Amrit Harjeet Bajwa: Matriarch of the Bajwa family; Harjeet's first wife; Raman, Rohan and Raj's mother; Mahima, Aarav, Payal and Rakshit's grandmother (2016–2017)
- Kushabh Manghani as Nihaal Bajwa; Mohini's son, Pami's brother (2017)
- Lavina Tandon as Swaroop Bajwa: Harjeet's sister; Jagan's ex-lover (2016)
- Mukesh Khanna as Lala Pratap Singh Bajwa: Harjeet and Swaroop's father; Raman, Rohan and Raj's grandfather (2016)(Dead)
- Unknown as Pami: Mohini's daughter; Nihaal's sister.

=== Pahuja family ===
- Ankita Bahugana as Gunjan Pahuja(Pawania): Amba and Charan's second daughter; Simran and Manpreet's younger; Aman's wife (2017)
  - Sumbul Touqeer as young Gunjan Pawania (2016–2017)
- Nitin Goswami/Unknown as Aman Pahuja: Gunjan's husband (2016)

=== Other recurring cast ===
- Angad Hasija as Chandar Singh Sodhi (2016–2017)
- Roop Durgapal/Vindhya Tiwari as Sakshi Sinha: Rajveer's fake lover (2017)
- Rahul Verma Rajput as Ronit Sood (2016)
- Lakshya Wahi as Yuvraj (2016)
- Dolly Bindra as Mandavati Singh / Dumroo Daayan (2016)
- Pankaj Berry as Suraiya (2016)
- Gaurav Sharma as Veeresh "Veeru" Singh Dhillon :Amba's brother (2016–2017)
- Bhavana Balsavar as Sushila Taluja (2016)
- Ashish Kapoor as Jairaj "Jai" Prajapati (2016–2017)

== Reception ==
Urmimala Banerjee of Bollywood Life has commented "Waaris has the feel of the JP Dutta films of the 80s – earthy, masculine and dramatic. The highlight is obviously the performances. Right from Iqbal to Aarti Singh, they are in fine form. The plot has resemblances to Anup Singh’s Qissa. Here the difference is instead of the father, it’s the mother who makes her daughter live like a son. According to the makers, it is based on the tradition of Bacha Posh, which is quite prevalent in Afghanistan and Pakistan. With supernatural sagas and family dramas ruling TV, Waaris has a newer theme. It remains to be seen how the makers keep up the tempo, which is quite good in the first episode."

== Broadcast Television ==
Language	Title	Original Release	Network(s)	Last aired
Vietnam	Bi Mat Nguoi Thua Ke; Waaris	28 July 2017	TodayTV	7 May 2018
