= Rosh (film) =

- Directed by: Jayveer Panghaal
- Screenplay by: Jayveer Panghaal
- Story by: Jayveer Panghaal
- Produced by: Amrut Lal Soni; Jayveer Panghaal; Sachin Garg
- Starring: Mahaakshay Chakraborty; Nikita Soni; Yesh Raj; Alina Rai; Ruchi Tiwari
- Cinematography: Abhay Anand
- Edited by: Alok Singh
- Music by: Monty Sharma
- Production companies: Mates Entertainment; Shivan Music
- Release date: 12 May 2023
- Running time: 113 minutes
- Country: India
- Language: Hindi

Rosh is Indian Hindi language crime thriller movie starring Nikita Soni, Alina Rai, Ruchi Tiwari, Mimoh Chakraborty and Yash Raj (Yr).

== Production ==
Under the banner Mates Entertainment and Shivan Music, Rosh is produced by Amrut Lal Soni and Jayveer Pangal. Rosh is directed, story, lyrics, screenplay and dialogue is given by Jayveer Panghaal. The music is given by Monty Sharma and cinematography by Abhay Anand.

== Plot ==
The story of Rosh is a tale of a clash where it becomes difficult to differentiate between the hero and the villain, good and evil. On their way back from a party, Ronika, Alina, and Rajat are involved in an accident that changes everything. There are many layers of mystery between the delivery boy Ganesh and businessman Rajat Khanna. As events unfold, the story becomes even more mysterious, and the line between right and wrong becomes blurred for the protagonist and the antagonist.

== Cast ==
- Nikita Soni as Ronika
- Alina Rai as Alina
- Mahaakshay Chakraborty As Rajat Khanna
- Yesh Raj (Yr) as Ganesh
- Vrajesh Hirjee as Champat
- Govind Panday as Inspector
- Ruchi Tiwari as Priyanshi (Ganesh's wife)
- Allu Ashish Soni as Jignesh
- Mimo Chakraborty
- Virajesh Heerji
- Jill Kilroy

== Music ==
The music of the film is composed by Monty Sharma while lyrics are written by Jayveer Singh.

Track listing
No.	Title	Singer(s)	Length
1.	"De Daru Pani Thoda Kam"	Pranav Singhal, Sukriti Kakar, Prakriti Kakar	2:48
2.	"Teri Hi Duniya Hai"	Pranav Singhal	4:18
3.	"Bandiya"	Pranav Singhal	4:08
