= Fahmaan Khan =

Indian television actor (born 1990)

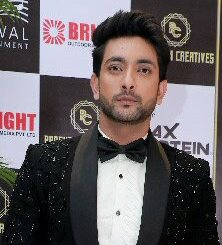
- Khan in 2023
- Born: 4 September 1990 (age 36)
- Occupations: Actor; model
- Years active: 2014–present
- Notable work: Apna Time Bhi Aayega; Imlie
- Relatives: Faraaz Khan (half-brother)

Fahmaan Khan (born 4 September 1990) is an Indian actor and model who predominantly works in Hindi television. He is best known for playing Dr. Veer Pratap Singh Rajawat in Zee TV's Apna Time Bhi Aayega and Aryan Singh Rathore in StarPlus's Imlie. He is half-brother of actor Faraaz Khan.

== Career ==
He started his career first as a model and worked with various brands. For more than nine years, he acted in theatre plays before landing in a short film titled Ver Joints in 2014. His small screen career started with a cameo role in Yeh Vaada Raha in 2015 and then a cameo role in the TV Serial Kundali Bhagya in 2018.

From 2017 to 2020, Khan was seen in recurring roles in Kya Qusoor Hai Amala Ka, Ishq Mein Marjawan and Mere Dad Ki Dulhan. Since 2020, he is seen playing lead roles in Apna Time Bhi Aayega, Imlie and Pyar Ke Saat Vachan Dharampatnii.

In 2022, he made his directorial debut with music video Ishq Ho Gaya sung by Tabish Pasha starring himself alongside Sumbul Touqeer. From April 2024 to August 2024, Khan portrayed Aryaman Mehta in Colors TV's Krishna Mohini opposite Debattama Saha.

== Media image ==
In 2026, he was listed in 40 Under 40 by the Indian edition of Variety.

== Filmography ==
=== Television ===
Year	Title	Role	Notes	Ref.
2017	Kya Qusoor Hai Amala Ka?	Suveer Malik	Negative Role	
2019	Ishq Mein Marjawan	CBI Officer Randheer Khurana	Supporting Role	
2019–2020	Mere Dad Ki Dulhan	Randeep Mehndiratta	Supporting Role	
2020–2021	Apna Time Bhi Aayega	Dr. Veerpratap "Veer" Singh Rajawat	Lead Role	
2021–2022	Imlie	Aryan Singh Rathore	Lead Role	
2022–2023	Pyar Ke Saat Vachan Dharampatnii	Ravi Randhawa	Lead Role	
2024	Krishna Mohini	Aryaman "Arya" Mehta	Lead Role	
2024–2025	Iss Ishq Ka Rabb Rakha	Ranbir Singh Bajwa	Lead Role	

==== Special appearances ====
Year	Title	Role	Ref.
2018	Kundali Bhagya	Samar	
2022	Ravivaar With Star Parivaar	Aryan Singh Rathore	
2022	Bigg Boss 16	Himself	
2023	Parineetii	Ravi Randhawa	
2023	Entertainment Ki Raat Housefull	Himself	

=== Web series ===
Year	Title	Role	Notes
2019	Gandii Baat 2	Soma	Episode 4

=== Music video appearances ===
Year	Title	Singer	Ref.
2019	"Tere Bina"	Hardil Pandya	
2022	"Ishq Ho Gaya"	Tabish Pasha	
2023	"Beirada"	Tabish Pasha	
2023	"Ishq Nibhaja Mahiya"	Tabish Pasha	
2023	"All Love"	Tabish Pasha	

== Awards and nominations ==
Year	Award	Category	Work	Result	Ref.
2022	Indian Television Academy Awards	Popular Actor (Drama)	Apna Time Bhi Aayega	Nominated	
2022	Indian Television Academy Awards	Popular Actor (Drama)	Imlie	Nominated	

== See also ==
- List of Indian television actors
