= Megha Ray =

Indian television actress

- Born: Mumbai, Maharashtra, India
- Education: Rajiv Gandhi Institute of Technology, Mumbai
- Occupation: Actress
- Years active: 2019-present

Megha Ray is an Indian actress who primarily works in Hindi television. She began her career in 2019 with Dil Yeh Ziddi Hai. She is best known for her role as Rani in Apna Time Bhi Aayega. She gained further recognition for her portrayal as Radhika Yadav in Sapnon Ki Chhalaang.

== Television ==
Year	Serial	Role	Ref.
2019–20	Dil Yeh Ziddi Hai	Kajal Vyas	
2020–21	Apna Time Bhi Aayega	Rani Singh Rajawat	
2022	Rang Jaun Tere Rang Mein	Dhani Chaubey Tripathi (formerly Pandey)	
2022	Rang Jaun Tere Rang Mein	Devyani Tripathi Srivastava	
2023	Sapnon Ki Chhalaang	Radhika Yadav (Guddi)	
2025–2026	Divya Prem - Pyaar aur Rahasya Ki Kahaani	Divya	

=== Special appearances ===
Year	Serial	Role	Ref.
2021	Meet: Badlegi Duniya Ki Reet	Herself	
2022	Kumkum Bhagya	Herself	

== Awards and nominations ==
Year	Award	Category	Show	Result
2019	Zee Rishtey Awards	Favourite Naya Sadasya (Female)	Dil Yeh Ziddi Hai	Nominated
2019	Zee Rishtey Awards	Favourite Nayi Jodi (With Rohit Suchanti)	Dil Yeh Ziddi Hai	Won
2019	Zee Rishtey Awards	Favourite Nayi Jodi (With Shoaib Ali)	Dil Yeh Ziddi Hai	Nominated
