= Divya Prem: Pyaar Aur Rahasya Ki Kahaani =

- Genre: Drama; Romance; Supernatural; Fantasy
- Created by: Neeraj Sharma; Nissar Parvez; Alind Srivastava
- Screenplay by: Divya Nayar
- Story by: Laxmi Jaykumar; Shashwat Rai
- Directed by: Harsh B Agrawal; Sanjay Satavase
- Creative director: Arya Gupta
- Music by: Sarthak Nakul
- No. of seasons: 1
- No. of episodes: 485

Production
- Producers: Nissar Parvez; Alind Srivastava; Hitesh Takkar
- Editors: Ganga; Prashant Rai
- Production company: Peninsula Pictures

Original release
- Network: Sun Neo
- Release: 16 June 2025 – present

Divya Prem: Pyaar Aur Rahasya Ki Kahaani is an Indian Hindi-language television supernatural series that premiered on 16 June 2025 on Sun Neo and streams digitally on Sun NXT. Produced by Peninsula Pictures and stars Megha Ray, Kavitha Banerjee and Suraj Pratap Singh.

== Plot ==
The first storyline begins many years in the past, in a tapovana (remote spiritual retreat) near Ujjain. In the tapovana lived many mohinis, each possessing immense powers, such as the ability to bring the dead back to life. But among them one mohini, who desired immortality, performed the dark ritual of Shmashana Sādhanā (a graveyard ritual involving the dead). She gained numerous dark powers and was transformed into Karn Mohini, killing all the other mohinis and absorbed their powers. Only one mohini remained — her name was Netra. According to a prophecy it was revealed that Netra's daughter would be the one to end Karn Mohini. So, Netra left her tapovana and began living on Earth. She married a man named Raghu and became pregnant with Raghu's child, who they named Divya. Eventually Karn Mohini found and tried to kill Netra, and snatch her new born baby girl who has been born as a swarn mohini (golden goddess). But at the same time Raghu's sister-in-law also delivered a baby girl named Tapasya. Karna mohini misidentifies Tapasya as the mohini Netra's daughter, Divya, so she takes Tapasya with her.

The subsequent unfolding story largely focuses on the grown up Divya finding romance with a young man named Prem, while dealing with the threat of the evil Karn Mohini.

After the first story concluded, the second storyline began by jumping forward in time by eight years. Divya and Prem have now adopted a daughter, Tara, and are living unremarkable lives as husband and wife in their Ujjain family home alongside Prem's mother, Padma. Also in the same home is Prem's cousin, Bittu, his wife Vishaka, and their son Sappu. Vishaka is secretly a naagin (snake who can take human form), and a former henchwoman of Karna Mohini who betrayed her mistress. The family's peace is threatened when Rakshasi, the sister of Karna Mohini, returns after a century-long absence and learns of her sister's defeat. During her absence she had acquired many dark powers, and she intends to use them to get revenge on the people of Ujjain, in particular its children.

Divya is forced to use her own golden goddess powers to protect the community's children, but she adopts a costume and golden mask so that Tara and Sappu will not recognise her. The children christen the new costumed heroine 'Super Aunty'. And so begins a series of self-contained adventures in which Divya (as Super Aunty), her husband Prem, and the shape-shifting naagin Vishaka, battle a succession of extra-terrestrial and supernatural threats, many of them created by their arch foe Rakshasi.

== Cast ==
=== Main ===
- Megha Ray as Divya / Super Aunty: a swarn mohini, Prem's wife and Tara's adopted mother, Raghu and Netra's daughter, Tapasya's sister
- Suraj Pratap Singh as Prem; Divya's husband and Tara's adopted father, Padma's son;
  - Nihan Jain as Young Prem (2025)
- Harithi Joshi as Tara (second storyline): Prem and Divya's adopted daughter;
- Shreshtha Pramanik as Vishaka / Vishaili: a shape shifting snake, Bittu's wife and Sappu's mother (as 'Vishaka'), former henchwoman to Karn Mohini (as 'Vishaili')

=== Recurring ===
- Rushiraj Pawar as Cheelraj: the eagle king who wants to destroy the Naglok
- Kunal Gaud as Bittu: Vishaka's husband and Sappu's father, Ratna's son, Prem's cousin;
- Aqdas Khan as Sappu (second storyline): son of Bittu and Vishaka;
- Sanjana Phadke as Padma: Prem's mother, Divya's mother-in-law, Tara's adopted grandmother;
- Massheuddin Qureshi ( Raghuvendar mathur as hero's father negative character
- Akanksha Gilani as Malini: Ruhi's and Bittu's mother, Vishaka's mother-in-law, Sappu's grandmother, mohinis's sevika
- Rohit Mehta as Gajendra (first storyline): Padma and Raghuvendra's son, Prem's brother;
- Nyshita Bajaj as Ruhi (first storyline); Gajendra's young daughter;
- Sarthak Dayma as Tinku (second storyline): school friend of Tara and Sappu;
- Tanishq Shah as Sheena (second storyline): school friend of Tara and Sappu.
- Kavita Banerjee as Karn Mohini (first storyline): Rakshasi's sister, Tapasya's adopted mother;
- Shurti Anand as Netra (first storyline): a mohini; Divya's mother and Raghu's wife;
- Palak Rana as Tapasya (first storyline): Divya's sister, the new Karn Mohini;
- Ridhima Tiwari as Rakshasi (second storyline): sister of Karn Mohini;
- Shridhar Watsar as Dhan Krud (second storyline): comical sidekick to Rakshasi.
- Tanu Khan as Maya Jaduwala
- Raashul Tandon as Jimmy
- Neetha Shetty as Saaya (second storyline)

=== Guests ===
- Vinit Kakar as Macharasur (October 2025): guest villain who lives at a garbage dump and commands a swarm of mosquitoes;
- Darshana Khandelwal as April (April 2026): a mischievous guest villain based around the April Fools tradition;
- Riddhi Sharma as Shuddhi (April 2026);
- Anaf Khatri as Jeenu (April 2026);
- Aparna Agarwal (first storyline);
- Pinky Chinoy (first storyline);
- Nihal Ahmad as Chotu (first storyline): comical friend of Prem;
- Aadit as Shikara.

== Production ==
=== Development ===
The show was soft-rebooted after its initial storyline to shift genre and audience. The first storyline centred around a tale of romance, prophecy, and revenge, involving mohinis (enchanted women with supernatural powers). It ran for 106 episodes. Starting with episode 107 the second storyline adapted the supernatural elements into a classic superhero format, focusing heavily on stories aimed at a younger audience. It has currently broadcast approximately 200 episodes in this reinvented format.
