= Jogira Sara Ra Ra =

2023 Indian romantic comedy film

- Theatrical release poster
- Directed by: Kushan Nandy
- Written by: Ghalib Asad Bhopali
- Produced by: Kiran Shroff; Naeem Siddiqui
- Starring: Nawazuddin Siddiqui; Neha Sharma; Zarina Wahab
- Cinematography: Sourabh Waghmare
- Edited by: Virendra Gharse
- Music by: Score: Anup Bhat; Songs: Tanishk Bagchi; Meet Bros; Hitesh Modak
- Production company: Touchwood Multimedia Creations
- Distributed by: AA Films
- Release date: 26 May 2023
- Running time: 121 minutes
- Country: India
- Language: Hindi
- Budget: est. ₹25 crore
- Box office: est. ₹1.75 crore

Jogira Sara Ra Ra is a 2023 Indian Hindi-language romantic comedy film written by Ghalib Asad Bhopali and directed by Kushan Nandy and jointly produced by Kiran Shroff and Naeem Siddiqui. The film stars Nawazuddin Siddiqui and Neha Sharma, alongside Sanjay Mishra and Mahaakshay Chakraborty in supporting roles. It was released theatrically on 26 May 2023.

== Cast ==
- Nawazuddin Siddiqui as Jogi Pratap
- Neha Sharma as Dimple Chaubey
- Sanjay Mishra as Chacha Chaudhry
- Mahaakshay Chakraborty as Lallu
- Zarina Wahab
- Suman Patel as Sarita
- Ananya Thakur as Lalita
- Aanshi pal as Babita
- Manisha Gupta as Kavita
- Nikki Tamboli as Item number in the song "Cocktail"

== Production ==
The principal photography began on 27 February 2021. The film was wrapped up on 7 April 2021.

== Music ==
Jogira Sara Ra Ra

Soundtrack album by Meet Bros, Tanishk Bagchi and Hitesh Modak
- Released: 14 April 2023
- Recorded: 2021–2022
- Genre: Feature film soundtrack
- Length: 9:14
- Language: Hindi
- Label: Zee Music Company

Official audio
- Jogira Sara Ra Ra (Audio Jukebox) on YouTube

The songs are composed by Meet Bros, Tanishk Bagchi and Hitesh Modak while the song lyrics are written by Lavraj, Kumaar and Vayu.

No.	Title	Lyrics	Music	Singer(s)	Length
1.	"Babua"	Lavraj	Hitesh Modak	Suvarna Tiwari, Anandi Joshi	3:10
2.	"Torture"	Kumaar	Meet Bros	Jonita Gandhi, Meet Bros	3:37
3.	"Cocktail"	Vayu	Tanishk Bagchi	Nakash Aziz, Nikhita Gandhi	2:27
Total length:					9:14

== Reception ==
=== Box office ===
As of 30 May, Jogira Sara Ra Ra collected 1.93 crore.
