= Neel Motwani =

Indian actor

- Born: 31 January; Nagpur, Maharashtra
- Occupations: Actor, Model
- Years active: 2013–present
- Known for: Waaris; Yeh Hai Mohabbatein

Neel Motwani is an Indian television actor known for portraying Advocate Neel Pathak in Yeh Hai Mohabbatein and Raj Bajwa in Waaris.

== Biography ==
Motwani acted in the television series Waaris as Raj Bajwa. He previously appeared in Ye Hai Mohabbatein as Adovacte Neel Pathak and Bahu Hamari Rajni Kant, and other serials on Sony Entertainment Television, Colors TV and Zee TV. He gained popularity by playing a weird geek scientist named Devendra in the show Bahu Hamari Rajni Kant.

Motwani is also a singer, guitarist and keyboard player.

== Television ==
Year	Title	Role	Notes	Ref(s)
2012	C.I.D.	Raman	Episode 820	
2013	C.I.D.	Harsh	Episode 921	
2013	Bade Achhe Lagte Hain	Daljeet Kapoor		
2014-2015	Ye Hai Mohabbatein	Advocate Neel Pathak	Cameo appearance	
2014-2015	Kumkum Bhagya	Corporator Neel Thakur	Secondary male antagonist	
2014	Meri Aashiqui Tumse Hi	Pranav	Cameo appearance	
2014	Beintehaa	Bilal Rahim Qureshi		
2015	Uff! Yeh Nadaniyaan	Dhananjay		
2015	Aahat	Aman	Season 6 Episode 56	
2016-2017	Bahu Hamari Rajni Kant	Dev/Devendra Bangdu/D'Bang	Supporting role	
2017	Waaris	Rajveer Bajwa	Male lead role	
2018	Kundali Bhagya	Corporator Neel Thakur	Special appearance	
2019	Paramavatar Shri Krishna	Surya Putra Karn	Epic Mahabharat's character	
2019	Tera Kya Hoga Alia	Kunal Ahuja		
2020	Haiwaan	Ashwathama		
2020	Bramharakshas 2	Maddan	Supporting role	
2023	Bekaboo	Vijay	Cameo appearance	
2023	Sapnon Ki Chhalaang	Hrithik		

== Filmography ==
Year	Title	Role	Notes	Ref.
2014	Main Tera Hero	Neel	Balaji Motion Pictures	
2019	Dosti Ke Side Effects	Manveer		
