= Shehzada (2023 film) =

2023 Indian film by Rohit Dhawan

- Theatrical release poster
- Directed by: Rohit Dhawan
- Screenplay by: Rohit Dhawan
- Dialogues by: Hussain Dalal
- Story by: Trivikram Srinivas
- Based on: Ala Vaikunthapurramuloo by Trivikram Srinivas
- Produced by: Bhushan Kumar; Krishan Kumar; Aman Gill; Allu Aravind; S. Radha Krishna; Kartik Aaryan
- Starring: Kartik Aaryan; Kriti Sanon; Paresh Rawal; Manisha Koirala; Ronit Roy
- Cinematography: Sudeep Chatterjee; Sanjay F. Gupta
- Edited by: Ritesh Soni
- Music by: Songs: Pritam; Guest Composer: Abhijit Vaghani; Background Score: Julius Packiam
- Production companies: T-Series Films; Allu Entertainment; Haarika & Hassine Creations; Brat Films
- Distributed by: AA Films
- Release date: 17 February 2023
- Running time: 145 minutes
- Country: India
- Language: Hindi
- Budget: ₹65 crore
- Box office: est. ₹47.43 crore

Shehzada (transl. Prince) is a 2023 Indian Hindi-language action comedy film directed by Rohit Dhawan. A remake of the Telugu film Ala Vaikunthapurramuloo (2020), the film stars Kartik Aaryan, Kriti Sanon, Paresh Rawal, Manisha Koirala and Ronit Roy.

Principal photography began in October 2021 and ended in January 2023 with filming held in Mumbai, Mauritius and Delhi. The music was scored by Pritam. Released on 17 February 2023, it was a critical and commercial failure.

== Plot ==
Valmiki and Randeep start their careers as clerks in the company of Aditya Jindal. Randeep, who marries Jindal's daughter Yashoda "Yashu," becomes wealthy while Valmiki remains poor. On the day of the birth of both their children, Randeep's son appears to be dead. When nurse Sulochana informs Valmiki about this, he pities Randeep and offers to exchange his baby with the dead one since the Jindals have done so much for him.

However, after switching them, Randeep's child begins to cry, having not died after all. Valmiki, sensing that his son would have a better life growing up in a rich family, prevents Sulochana from switching the babies back and accidentally pushes her off a ledge. Sulochana goes into a coma, keeping Valmiki's secret from coming out.

25 years later, Raj, raised at Jindal's house, is timid and innocent, while Bantu, raised by Valmiki, is street-smart and outspoken. Valmiki, who favours his own son, Raj, treats Bantu badly. Bantu gets a job at a law firm headed by Samara, who is impressed by his knowledge and quick-wittedness. Meanwhile, Raj returns from his studies abroad. Jindal sends Raj to reject Sarang, a powerful man who offers to buy their company's shares but deals with drugs. Randeep watches the deal from a restaurant where Samara has a meeting. When the client misbehaves with Samara, Bantu interferes. Randeep is disappointed by Raj's inability to say no to Sarang but beams at Bantu and Samara when they defend themselves against the rowdy client. Following this, Raj becomes engaged to Samara but she and Bantu have fallen in love.

Sarang attempts to kill Randeep for getting in his way. Bantu saves Randeep; at the hospital, he meets Sulochana, who has come out of her coma. She reveals Bantu's true parentage before dying. Bantu denounces Valmiki as his father. Aditya Jindal, Bantu's true grandfather, is fond of Bantu for saving Randeep and hires him.

Bantu begins to address the issues plaguing the house by patching up Randeep relationship with Yashu, which has been strained since Randeep's affair seven years ago. He also settles the dispute with Sarang and reforms the corrupt family members, Kailash and Arun. He and Samara tell Raj about their relationship; Raj calls off his marriage with Samara and confronts his parents, telling them he should be allowed to make his own decisions rather than have everything handed to him. Sarang kidnaps Yashu and threatens to kill her unless Randeep gives him money.

Bantu saves Yashu. Jindal reveals that he knew all along who Bantu was, which is why he brought him home; he had overheard the conversation between Sulochana and Bantu right before her death. Bantu unites with Randeep but asks him not to reveal the truth to Yashu, fearing she might be disheartened to know that Raj, who she dotes on so much, is not her real child. Yashu remarks that Bantu is like her son, as he saved her and the family. Yashu asks Valmiki to train Raj to be as competent as Bantu and become the CEO of their company. Bantu forgives Valmiki and mends his relationship with him.

== Cast ==
- Kartik Aaryan as Bantu Nanda
- Kriti Sanon as Samara Singh, Bantu's love interest
- Paresh Rawal as Valmiki, Bantu's foster father and Raj's father
- Manisha Koirala as Yashoda "Yashu" Jindal Nanda, Bantu's biological mother and Raj's foster mother
- Ronit Roy as Randeep Nanda, Bantu's biological father and Raj's foster father
- Sachin Khedekar as Aditya Jindal, Bantu's grandfather
- Debattama Saha as Nisha, Bantu's foster sister and Raj's biological sister
- Ankur Rathee as Raj, Valmiki's biological son
- Rajpal Yadav as Inspector Satish Yadav, DP
- Rakesh Bedi as Satyanarayan Singh, Samara's father
- Sunny Hinduja as Sarang Paul
- Vin Rana as Vikrant Paul, Sarang's brother
- Ashwin Mushran as Kailash Jindal
- Ali Asgar as Arun Jindal
- Shalini Kapoor Sagar as Aarti Jindal
- Aishwarya Narkar as Veena, Bantu's foster mother
- Sharvari Lohokare as Nurse Sulochana
- Vipul Goyal as Doctor

== Production ==
The film was announced on 12 October 2021. Principal photography began on the next day i.e. 13 October 2021 in Mumbai. The next schedule took place in Delhi. After many sequences were shot in Mauritius, filming wrapped up on 10 January 2023.

== Soundtrack ==
Shehzada

Soundtrack album by Pritam and Abhijit Vaghani
- Released: 28 February 2023
- Recorded: 2022–2023
- Genre: Feature film soundtrack
- Length: 21:29
- Language: Hindi
- Label: T-Series
- Producer: Bhushan Kumar
External audio
- Shehzada - Full Album on YouTube

All the songs are composed by Pritam while the song "Character Dheela 2.0" from the 2011 film Ready has been recreated by Abhijit Vaghani and Pritam. The lyrics are written by Kumaar, Mayur Puri, Shloke Lal and IP Singh. The background score was composed by Julius Packiam.

The first single titled "Munda Sona Hoon Main" was released on 16 January 2023. The second single titled "Chedkhaniyan" was released on 24 January 2023. The third single titled "Mere Sawaal Ka" was released on 2 February 2023. The fourth single titled "Character Dheela 2.0" was released on 9 February 2023. The song, "Character Dheela 2.0", is a remix of the song "Character Dheela" from Salman Khan-starrer Ready.

All music is composed by Pritam except where noted.

Track listing
| No. | Title | Lyrics | Singer(s) | Length |
|---|---|---|---|---|
| 1. | "Munda Sona Hoon Main" | Kumaar | Diljit Dosanjh, Nikhita Gandhi | 3:50 |
| 2. | "Chedkhaniyan" | Shloke Lal, IP Singh | Arijit Singh, Nikhita Gandhi | 3:51 |
| 3. | "Mere Sawaal Ka" | Shloke Lal | Shashwat Singh, Shalmali Kholgade | 4:15 |
| 4. | "Character Dheela 2.0" (Recreated by Abhijit Vaghani) | Amitabh Bhattacharya, Ashish Pandit | Neeraj Shridhar, Style Bai | 2:37 |
| 5. | "Shehzada Title Track" | Mayur Puri | Sonu Nigam | 3:47 |
| 6. | "Mere Sawaal Ka" (King Version) | Shloke Lal | King | 3:09 |
| Total length: | | | | 21:29 |

== Release ==
=== Theatrical ===
Shehzada was released on 17 February 2023. Initially the film was scheduled for theatrical release on 4 November 2022 but was delayed due to production.

=== Home media ===
The digital streaming rights of the film were acquired by Netflix for ₹40 crore. On the platform, the film premiered on 14 April 2023. Goldmines Telefilms who also previously dubbed and released Ala Vaikunthapurramuloo in Hindi bought the telecast rights and aired the film on their TV channel on 24 October 2023.

== Reception ==
=== Box office ===
As of 17 March 2023, the film has grossed ₹38.33 crore (US$4.0 million) in India and ₹9.1 crore (US$940,000) overseas for a worldwide gross collection of ₹47.43 crore (US$4.9 million).

=== Critical response ===
Shehzada received mixed reviews from critics.

Sukanya Verma of Rediff.com wrote: "Kartik's No Allu Arjun" and went ahead to add on that: "It's nearly not enough to make an already brainless movie a better one." Rahul Desai in this review for Film Companion wrote: "A Kartik Aaryan Entertainer that forgets to entertain" whereas another critic labelled Aaryan as a "Royal Bore" synonymous to the film title. Nandini Ramnath of Scroll.in stated: "Rehash of Telugu hit is catnip for Kartik Aaryan fans" Dhaval Roy of The Times of India gave the film 3.5 stars out of 5, stating "With campy humour and action, this is just a mass entertainer". Saibal Chatterjee of NDTV stated: "Take Kartik Aaryan Out, There Might Not Be Much Left. The obsolescence of the film's essence is difficult to shrug off."

Shalini Langer of The Indian Express gave 0.5 out of 5 and stated: "Only Manisha Koirala and Ronit Roy come out of this Kartik Aaryan starrer with some dignity intact. That's more than can be said about the audience. It should be a crime to make such films in 21st century." Ziniya Bandhyopadhyay wrote for India Today that the film was a disappointment of massive proportions. India Today later included the film as one of the five worst Hindi films of 2023. In his review for The Hindu, Anuj wrote :Kartik Aaryan can't salvage this prince of pointless banter. It's the wrong vehicle to launch Kartik Aaryan into the universe of a mass entertainer. Pratyusha Mishra for The Quint called the film "A Royally Painful Massy Film" At Firstpost, Vinamra Mathur wrote: "The problem with the remake is it never earns the mood it wants to create." Devesh Sharma of Filmfare opined: "Don't expect anything to make sense because it doesn't. The original was extremely loud and over the top, so the remake can hardly be less so."
