= Dil Dosti Dilemma =

2024 Indian drama series by Debbie Rao

- Release poster
- Genre: Drama
- Based on: Asmara’s Summer by Andaleeb Wajid
- Written by: Manjiri Vijay Pupala; Anuraadha Tewari
- Directed by: Debbie Rao
- Starring: Anushka Sen; Shishir Sharma; Mahesh Thakur; Priyanshu Chatterjee
- Music by: Sid Paul
- Country of origin: India
- Original language: Hindi

Production
- Producers: Jahanara Bhargava; Seema Mohapatra
- Cinematography: Deep Metkar
- Editor: Vaishak Ravi

Original release
- Network: Amazon Prime Video
- Release: 25 April 2024

Dil Dosti Dilemma is a 2024 Indian Hindi language romantic comedy drama television series for Amazon Prime Video. The series is directed by Debbie Rao and produced by Jahanara Bhargava and Seema Mohapatra. It stars Anushka Sen, Shishir Sharma, Mahesh Thakur, Priyanshu Chatterjee and others. The series premiered on 25 April 2024.

== Plot ==
Dil Dosti Dilemma, based on the book Asmara's Summer by Andaleeb Wajid, is the story of a young girl, Asmara, who has to move to her grandparents' home for the summer instead of traveling with her parents to Canada. Popular and witty in college, she doesn't want her friends to know her association with this tacky neighbourhood, and she lies to them that she's gone to Canada. Living for a month with her grandparents, though, making new friends, checking out the hot neighbour next door, and learning things about herself, makes Asmara undergo a journey of change.

== Cast ==
- Anushka Sen as Asmara
- Shruti Seth as Arshiya: Asmara's mother
- Khalid Siddiqui as Khalid: Asmara's father
- Shishir Sharma as Asmara's Nana
- Tanvi Azmi as Asmara's Naani
- Revathi Pillai as Naina Kariappa: Asmara's friend
- Elisha Mayor as Tania: Asmara's friend
- Kush Jotwani as Farzan: Asmara's love interest and Rukhsana's Brother
- Priyanshu Chatterjee as Rohan Kariappa: Naina's father
- Akshit Sukhija as Armaan: Naina's beau
- Mahesh Thakur as AB: Tania's father
- Visakha Pandey as Rukhsana: Asmara's childhood friend
- Ritik Ghanshani as Suhail: Rukhsana's love interest
- Suhasini Mulay as Akhtar Begum
- Arjun Berry as Dhruv: Tania's office colleague
- Nitya Beria as Nia
- Shreya Shanker as Ariana
- Farida Dadi as Ghazala Aapa
- Kenny Panchal as Sharifa
- Dilnaz Irani as Nandini
- Sonal Jha as Afroz
- Samvedna Suwalka as Mandira
- Kanan Gill as Nasir Akhtar: Cameo Appearance

== Reception ==
Saibal Chatterjee of NDTV gave 3 stars out of 5 and said that "It thrives on the simple and pertinent ideas that it espouses about the clash of tradition and modernity and the importance of balancing heritage with hasty models of urban redevelopment driven by greed." Archika Khurana of The Times of India rated 3/5 stars and said "This young adult drama serves as a poignant exploration of the importance of cultural identity, familial bonds, and self-discovery." Deepanjana Pal writes in the Film Companion that if you’re in the mood for an easy, breezy, undemanding binge that holds out the reward of a sweetly chaste love story, Dil Dosti Dilemma should be your weekend watch. Trisha Bhattacharya of India Today writes in her review that "If you're craving some chill time and in need of a show that's personal, then look no further than Prime Video's freshest delight" Udita Jhunjhunwala of the Scroll.in stated that "Dil Dosti Dilemma is a low-cal, feel-good entertainer that gradually draws you in, just the way Asmara is drawn into Tibri Road." Vinamra Mathur of the Firstpost stated in his review that "Dil Dosti Dilemma is both alarming and aspirational. It can be scary for any child who aspires to travel to Canada to land up at a place she has no desire to be at." Deepa Gahlot of Rediff.com rated 3/5 stars and observed "Dil Dosti Dilemma is a coming-of-age series without profanity, and that by itself breaks the current mould."

== See also ==
- Happy Family: Conditions Apply
- Panchayat
