= Bandwaale =

2026 Indian television series

- Promotional release poster
- Genre: Comedy drama
- Written by: Swanand Kirkire; Ankur Tewari
- Directed by: Akshat Verma; Ankur Tewari
- Starring: Swanand Kirkire; Zahan Kapoor; Shalini Pandey
- Music by: Sid Shirodkar
- Country of origin: India
- Original language: Hindi
- No. of seasons: 1
- No. of episodes: 8

Production
- Producers: Vikram Singh; Ankur Tewari
- Cinematography: Himman Dhamija
- Editor: Gourav Gopal Jha
- Camera setup: Multi-camera
- Running time: 30–37 minutes
- Production company: OML Entertainment

Original release
- Network: Prime Video
- Release: 13 February 2026

Bandwaale is a 2026 Indian Hindi-language musical comedy drama television series directed by Akshat Verma and Ankur Tewari it features Swanand Kirkire, Zahan Kapoor and Shalini Pandey in lead roles, alongside a supporting ensemble cast. The series premiered on 13 February 2026 on Prime Video.

== Synopsis ==
Set in Ratlam, the series follows Mariam, a young poet who struggles against the constraints of tradition and limited autonomy in her surroundings. Seeking self-expression and a sense of identity, she begins posting her poetry anonymously online. Her path gradually intersects with Robo, a brass band vocalist, and DJ Psycho, whose companionship and encouragement inspire her to pursue her artistic aspirations.

== Cast ==
- Swanand Kirkire as Robo Kumar
- Zahan Kapoor as DJ Psycho
- Shalini Pandey as Mariam
- Ashish Vidyarthi as David
- Sanjana Dipu as Cynthia
- Anupama Kumar as Valsala
- Vikram Kochhar as Rafi
- Robin Das as Ismail
- Naushad Mohammed Kunju as Sebastian
- Addis Akkara as Roysten

== Release ==
The trailer was released on 11 February 2026

The series began streaming on Prime Video on 13 February 2026.

== Reception ==
Rahul Deasi of The Hollywood Reporter India writes that "The endless 8-episode seeries revolves around a small-town poetess who struggles to break free from societal shackles." Abhishek Srivastava of Times of India gave 2.5 stars out of 5 and said that "‘Bandwaale’ comes across as a safe idea stretched into a full series without enough substance to sustain it. It is sincere, but sincerity alone does not create engagement. The themes of ambition, self-expression, and friendship are present, yet they are handled in a way that feels cautious." Deepa Gahlot writing for scroll.in stated that "the series derails into absurd subplots that have no bearing on anything else going on in the family. If there’s a melodramatic misunderstanding over a pregnancy, there’s also a crazy rescue from a charlatan’s clinic."

Vinamra Mathur of Firstpost rated it 2.5 stars out of 5 and said that "There are a lot of boxes that Bandwaale tries to tick. But most of them now feel tried and tested." Divya Nair of Rediff.com gave 3.5 stars out of 4 and said that "Kudos to the makers for attempting to create a meaningful series, Bandwaale, that blends the beauty of music to inspire you to look within, and find your voice." Pritinanda Behera of India Today rated it 2/5 stars and writes that "Bandwaale attempts to tell a heartfelt story about dreams, artistic freedom, and small-town pressures but falters due to scattered storytelling and predictable tropes."
