= Crazy Cukkad Family =

- Film poster
- Directed by: Ritesh Menon
- Written by: Suhaas Shetty, Kushal Punjabi
- Produced by: Prakash Jha
- Starring: Swanand Kirkire; Shilpa Shukla; Zachary Coffin; Nora Fatehi; Kiran Karmarkar; Jagat Singh; Pravina Deshpande; Kushal Punjabi; Jugnu Ishiqui; Anushka Sen
- Cinematography: Sojan Narayanan
- Edited by: Shakti Hasija
- Music by: Songs: Sidhartha-Suhaas; Lyrics: Kumaar
- Production company: Prakash Jha Productions
- Distributed by: Prakash Jha Productions
- Release date: 16 January 2015 (India)
- Country: India
- Language: Hindi

Crazy Cukkad Family (transl. Crazy chicken family) is a 2015 Indian Hindi-language comedy film directed by Ritesh Menon and produced by Prakash Jha. The film stars Swanand Kirkire, Shilpa Shukla, Zachary Coffin, Nora Fatehi, Kushal Punjabi, Jugnu Ishiqui, Jagat Singh and Anushka Sen. Upon release the movie received mixed to positive responses. Rajkumar Hirani, Sudhir Mishra and Gauri Shinde praised the performances and the story.

== Plot ==
This roller coaster ride begins with the Wealthy Mr. Beri slipping into his third Coma. His four estranged children have to make it back home to be there while their father "hopefully" breathes his last, leaving behind his huge estate in the mountains.

Pawan Beri, the oldest child of Mr. & Mrs Beri, is a hustler who is in big trouble with a local mafia don turned Politician. Rude, brash, and arrogant, he looks at everything from his own crooked view. Archana Beri is a wannabe socialite and former Miss India hopeful, forced to give up her dreams after an arranged marriage at a young age. She is bitter towards the entire world, including her family, and bullies her meek husband Digvijay who in secret has a dual personality. Aman Beri is the New York-based son who returns with his American wife, Amy who meets the family for the first time. He pretends to be a top fashion photographer, but is actually struggling and unemployed. Abhay "Chotu" Beri is the youngest in the family. Not much is known about his present status. Years ago he was sent to New Zealand to study, but has returned only now.

Along with the four siblings, various characters like a village item girl, an extra slow family lawyer, and 3 goofy investigators. The chaos begins when they discover that in order to open the will, they need to get 'Chotu' married. Set in a lush green hill station, the story is about the dysfunctional Beri family. The story is about an estranged family brought together by greed but eventually finding each other, discovering the true meaning of being a family.

== Cast ==
- Swanand Kirkire as Pawan Beri
- Shilpa Shukla as Archana Berry
- Kushal Punjabi as Aman Beri
- Siddharth Sharma as Abhay Beri/ Chotu
- Pravina Deshpande
- Kiran Karmarkar
- Yusuf Hussain
- Ninad Kamat
- Nora Fatehi as Amy
- Vikrant Soni as Mony Beri
- Jagat Singh as Lakhan
- Zachary Coffin
- Jugnu Ishiqui as Cherry
- Dev Dhakal
- Anushka Sen

== Soundtrack ==
Crazy Cukkad Family

Soundtrack album by Sidhartha-Suhaas
- Released: 21 November 2014
- Genre: Feature film soundtrack
- Length: 19:47
- Language: Hindi
- Label: T-Series

The soundtrack for the album was composed by Sidharth Suhaas and lyrics were penned by Kumaar.

No.	Title	Singer(s)	Length
1.	"Crazy Cukkad"	Shahid Mallya, Shipra Goyal, Kumaar	3:26
2.	"Party Ka Hero"	Shahid Mallya, Shipra Goyal	4:34
3.	"Chand Yeh"	Swanand Kirkire	3:59
4.	"Sexy Wala PakodaSexy Wala Pakoda"	Sumann, Suhas Shetty	3:37
5.	"Yeh Dil Jaane Na"	Shipra Goyal, Ankit Dayal	4:11
Total length:			19:47
