= Am I Next =

2023 Indian Hindi-language crime film

- Official release poster
- Directed by: Rahat Kazmi
- Written by: Screenplay: Kritika Rampal; Rahat Kazmi; Dialogue: Shalini Bhede; Rahat Kazmi
- Story by: Kritika Rampal
- Produced by: Rahat Kazmi; Tariq Khan; Zeba Sajid
- Starring: Anushka Sen; Neelu Dogra; Pooja Dargan; Tariq Khan; Ahmer Haider
- Cinematography: Luxmi Chand
- Edited by: Rahat Kazmi
- Music by: Tuhin K Biswas
- Production companies: Rahat Kazmi Film Studios; Loop Pool Films and Piku Art's (Singapore)
- Distributed by: ZEE5
- Release date: 17 March 2023
- Running time: 85 minutes
- Country: India
- Language: Hindi

Am I Next is a 2023 Indian Hindi-language crime film directed and produced by Rahat Kazmi under the banner of Rahat Kazmi Film Studios, along with Loop Pool Films and Piku Art's (Singapore). It features Anushka Sen, Neelu Dogra, Pooja Dargan, Tariq Khan, and Ahmer Haider. It was digitally released on ZEE5 on 17 March 2023.

== Plot ==
A sudden shock grabs the family of 14–year old Honey, when they learn that their teenage daughter is pregnant. She was raped and now there is a long court battle to seek her right to terminate the pregnancy.

== Cast ==
- Anushka Sen as Honey
- Neelu Dogra as Rammi, Honey's mother
- Pankaj Khajuria as Ramandeep, Honey's father
- Rajeev Rana as Gopal Das, Aman's father
- Pooja Dargan as Lawyer Naina
- Swaroopa Ghosh as Vaibhavi Sachdeva
- Tariq Khan as Sukhchain Singh, Inspector
- Ahmer Haider as Dr. Rahul
- Satish Bhat as Aman
- Monica Aggarwal as Monica Sharma, High court judge
- Mir Sarwar as Lower court judge
- Kusum Tikko as Principal

== Release ==
The film was digitally premiered on ZEE5 on 17 March 2023. As a result, it reached audiences in 190+ countries.

== Reception ==
The film received positive reviews from critics as well as it is highly acclaimed movie on teenage rape. The Times of India rated 3 out of 5 stars and praised performances and screenplay. The Director of the film Rahat Kazmi said: "This film is extremely special to me because of the powerful story that we have. With a lot of research, we managed to make a film that will connect with the audience."

== Soundtrack ==
Am I Next

Soundtrack album by Tuhin K Biswas, Rohit Bhatia, Adif Altaf, Sukhamrit-Sachin
- Released: March 2023
- Genre: Feature film soundtrack
- Length: 14:59
- Language: Hindi
- Label: Panorama Music

The soundtrack is composed, arranged and produced by Tuhin K Biswas, Rohit Bhatia, Adif Altaf, Sukhamrit-Sachin.

Track listing
No.	Title	Lyrics	Music	Singer (s)	Length
1.	"Makdi Ke Jaale"	Rahat Kazmi	Tuhin K Biswas	Shovan Biswas	3:40
2.	"Meri Khata"	Adif Altaf	Rohit Bhatia, Adif Altaf	Rohil Bhatia	4:24
3.	"Savera"	Sukhamrit Soin	Sukhamrit-Sachin	Sukhamrit Soin	3:23
4.	"Dil Ronda Hai"	Rahat Kazmi	Tuhin K Biswas	Shovan Biswas	3:25
Total length:					14:59
