= Rocky (2013 film) =

- Promotional Poster
- Directed by: Sujit Mondal
- Written by: NK Salil; Vakkantham Vamsi
- Produced by: Shree Venkatesh Films
- Starring: Mimoh; Puja Banerjee; Mithun Chakraborty; Poulomi Das
- Music by: Jeet Gannguli
- Production companies: Shree Venkatesh Films, Surinder Films
- Release date: 26 April 2013
- Running time: 125 minutes
- Country: India
- Language: Bengali

Rocky is a 2013 Indian Bengali-language action thriller film directed by Sujit Mondal, starring Mimoh and Pooja. Earlier Sayantika was signed to play the female lead role as Nandini, but after a few days of shooting she refused to play the character as she did not like the change made in the story. The film also has Mithun Chakraborty in a guest appearance.

== Plot ==
Rocky is a goon from Mumbai and does anything for money. He is on a mission and constantly runs away from the police. Everyone relates to him as a 'chameleon' who constantly changes colors. Rocky finally reaches Kashmir and meets Nandini, and he instantly falls in love with her. Rocky rescues Nandini while being kidnapped by terrorists. Later Rocky finds that Nandini is already engaged to Avik. Avik is a goon (and the minister's son), but Nandini doesn't know that. When Nandini finds out that Avik is a goon, she dumps him. And she also discovers that she is in love with Rocky. Later on, Rocky kills Avik and the minister. One day when Rocky, Nandini, and Diya (Nandini's friend) go to the temple, Diya sees Rocky killing someone. And then there is a flashback about how he and Nandini met before, but she lost her memory. That happened because Nandini's brother was an undercover cop, and when goons found out, they killed the whole family. The only one who survived was Nandini, but she had a bullet in her head. The doctors said that she would lose her memory soon. So, she tells Rocky to kill the people who killed her family because she had seen Rocky beating up a bunch of people. In the end, Rocky kills all the goons who killed Nandini's family.

== Cast ==
- Mimoh as Rocky, a local gangster in Mumbai.
- Pooja as Nandini/Anindita Sen
- Poulomi Das as Diya
- Mithun Chakraborty as Fatakeshto, Rocky's father (cameo) / special appearance in an item song named "Rocky Bhai"
- Somnath Panja
- Bharat Kaul as Mafia Ravi Verma, the most wanted person in Interpol
- Surajit Sen as Raj Verma, Ravi Verma's younger brother
- Abir Goswami as Soumya Sen, an undercover police officer and Nandini's elder brother
- Rajat Ganguly as a corrupt Housing Minister Vinayak Sen
- Sujoy as minister's son, Avik Sen
- Moushumi Saha as Vinayak's wife
- Mita Chatterjee as Vinayak's mother
- Kaushik Chakravorty as Police Officer Ranjit Sinha
- Vashcar Dev as a Police officer

== Soundtrack ==
Rocky

Soundtrack album by Jeet Gannguli
- Released: 13 July 2013
- Recorded: 2013
- Genre: Feature film soundtrack
- Language: Bengali
- Label: Surinder Films
- Producers: Shree Venkatesh Films, Surinder Films

Jeet Gannguli chronology
Bapi Bari Jaa (2012)	Rocky (2013)	Boss: Born to Rule (2013)

Singles from Rocky
- 1. "Tui Borsha Bikeler Dheu" Released: 10 Dec 2018; 2. "Aaj Chai Toke" Released: 10 Dec 2018; 3. "Rocky Bhai" Released: 10 Dec 2018; 4. "Jay Maa Kali" Released: 11 Dec 2018

All lyrics are written by Prasen (Prasenjit Mukherjee), Raja Chanda; all music is composed by Jeet Gannguli.

No.	Title	Lyrics	Singer(s)	Length
1.	"Jay Maa Kali"	Prasen (Prasenjit Mukherjee)	Saikat, Swajal, Basudeb	2:34
2.	"Aaj Chai Toke"	Prasen (Prasenjit Mukherjee)	Jeet Gannguli	4:38
3.	"Tui Borsha Bikeler Dheu"	Prasen (Prasenjit Mukherjee)	Shaan, Palak Muchhal	4:51
4.	"Rocky Bhai"	Raja Chanda	Jeet Gannguli	4:25

== Reception ==
The music of Rocky, and the film as well, received bad reviews and was declared a flop at box office.
