= Debattama Saha =

Indian actress and singer

- Born: Silchar, Assam
- Education: Don Bosco High School, Silchar
- Alma mater: Amity University, Kolkata
- Occupations: Actress; Singer
- Years active: 2016–present

Debattama Saha is an Indian actress and singer who mainly works in Hindi and Bengali television. She is best known for her lead roles in Ishaaron Ishaaron Mein and Shaurya Aur Anokhi Ki Kahani. Born in Silchar, Assam, she is one of the very few people from this part of the country who ventured into Bollywood as well as Indian television, inspiring lots of young girls to pursue their dreams from this region.

She made her Bollywood film debut in 2023 with Shehzada and her Bengali film debut as a lead in Tobuo Bhalobashi (2025).

== Early life ==
Debattama Saha is originally from Silchar, Assam. She has said that as a child, her mother arranged for her to train as a singer and dancer secretly due to the objection of her father. She completed her studies from Don Bosco High School, Silchar and graduated in English Honours from Amity University, Kolkata.

== Career ==
Saha started her career in 2016 with E Amar Guru Dakshina. She played role of Shoi/Uma/Nayantara opposite Suman Dey and Biswarup Bandhopadhyay. She has also applied her training as a dancer.

In 2019, she made Hindi TV debut with Ishaaron Ishaaron Mein as a parallel lead role of Dr. Parineeti Ganguly opposite Mudit Nayar and Simran Pareenja. She both performed and helped choreograph the dance in the promotional video for the show.

From 2020 to 2021, she played the lead role of Anokhi Bhalla in Shaurya Aur Anokhi Ki Kahani opposite Karanvir Sharma. In 2021, after the end of Shaurya Aur Anokhi Ki Kahani, she also sang Jo Tera Howega video song in which she featured with Sharma, who also directed the video. She was also seen in the music video Aankhen Band Karke and Mubarak Ho with Sharma.

In 2022, she was seen as Mithai Gosain in Mithai opposite Aashish Bharadwaj.

In 2023, she was seen as Nisha Upadhyay in the movie Shehzada.

On 12 May 2023, she sang and featured in the video song Ranjhana. Since April 2024, she played Krishna Joshi in Krishna Mohini opposite Fahmaan Khan.

Saha made her Bengali film debut with Tobuo Bhalobashi, a romantic drama directed by Rabindra Nambiar and produced by Ashok and Himanshu Dhanuka. The film co-starred Aryann Bhowmik and Saheb Bhattacharya and was released theatrically on 1 August 2025.

In 2025, Saha starred in the YouTube series Parindey, produced by The Little Cinema Company.

She also appeared in a vertical-format series titled QAID, released on Rocket Reels. The project was designed for mobile-first short-form video platforms.

In 2026, Debattama Saha portrayed Saumya in the digital series Jab Zodiacs Met, directed by DKP. The series explored zodiac-based narratives and was released on online platforms, further expanding her work in digital and short-format content.

=== Film debut (2023–2025) ===
In 2023, Saha made her Hindi film debut with Shehzada, where she portrayed Nisha Upadhyay alongside Kartik Aaryan and Kriti Sanon.

She made her Bengali film debut in 2025 with Tobuo Bhalobashi, a romantic drama directed by Rabindra Nambiar and produced by Ashok and Himanshu Dhanuka. The film co-starred Aryann Bhowmik and Saheb Bhattacharya and was released theatrically on 1 August 2025.

=== Web series and digital projects (2025) ===
In 2025, Saha appeared in the YouTube series Parindey, produced by The Little Cinema Company.

She also starred in a vertical-format series titled QAID, released on Rocket Reels. The project was designed for mobile-first viewing on short-form video platforms.

== Filmography ==
=== Television ===
Year	Title	Role	Language	Ref.
2016–2018	E Amar Gurudakshina	Soi/Nayantara/Uma	Bengali	
2019–2020	Ishaaron Ishaaron Mein	Dr. Parineeti "Pari" Ganguly	Hindi	
2020–2021	Shaurya Aur Anokhi Ki Kahani	Anokhi Bhalla	Hindi	
2022	Mithai	Mithai Gosain	Hindi	
2024	Krishna Mohini	Krishna Joshi	Hindi	

=== Films ===
Year	Title	Role	Language	Ref.
2023	Shehzada	Nisha Upadhyay	Hindi	
2025	Tobuo Bhalobashi		Bengali	
2026	Keu Bole Biplobi Keu Bole Dakat	Fatima	Bengali	

=== Music videos ===
Year	Title	Singer	Ref.
2021	Jo Tera Howega	Herself	
2021	Aankhein Band Karke	Abhi Dutt	Ekta
2022	Mubarak Ho	Soham Naik	Naina

=== Web series ===
Year	Title	Role	Platform	Ref
2025	Parindey	Lead role	YouTube (The Little Cinema Company)	
2025	QAID	Lead role	Rocket Reels	
2026	Jabb Zodiacs Met	Lead role	Youtube (Director's Kut Productions)	
2026	Heer Sharma Gayi	Lead role	Youtube (Director's Kut Productions)	
2026	Undekhi (season 4)	Supporting role	Sony Liv	
