= Vivana Singh =

Indian television actress

- Born: Moradabad, Uttar Pradesh, India
- Occupations: Actress; model
- Years active: 2008–present

Vivana Singh is an Indian actress who had appeared in TV serials like Mahabharat, Police Factory, Ajeeb Daastaan Hai Ye, Kumkum Bhagya etc. She is known for her roles as Inspector Maya Mohan and Sarika Sachdev.

== Early life ==
Singh was born in Moradabad, Uttar Pradesh and has her ancestral home in Amroha. She studied in a boarding school in Mussoorie.

== Filmography ==
=== Film ===
Year	Film	Role	Language	Notes
2008	Jimmy	Megha	Hindi	Debut
2012	Desi Romeos		Punjabi	
2021	Dybbuk		Hindi	

=== Television ===
Year	Title	Role	Notes	Ref(s)
2013–2014	Mahabharat	Goddess Ganga		
2014	Kehta Hai Dil Jee Le Zara	Suparna Anvay Goel		
2014–2015	Ajeeb Daastaan Hai Ye	Sarika Sachdev / Madhura Kashyap		
2015	Police Factory	Inspector Maya Mohan		
2016–2017	C.I.D.	Cyber Inspector Ritu		
2017–2018	Kumkum Bhagya	Simonika Dushyant Rana		
2018	Laal Ishq	Daanvi		
2018	Savdhaan India	Savita		
2020–2021	Apna Time Bhi Aayega	Rajeshwari Singh Rajawat		
2022	Shubh Shagun	Bindiya		
2023	Titli	Mania Manikant Mehta		
2024	Pracchand Ashok	Maharani Diana		
2026–present	Hastinapur Ke Veer	Gandhari		

=== Web-series ===
Year	Title	Role	Notes
2019	Faceless	Nisha Thakral	
2020	Shrikant Bashir	Shalani Kaura	
