= Loot (2011 film) =

- Theatrical release poster
- Directed by: Rajnish Raj Thakur
- Written by: S.M. Sabir Firozabadi
- Produced by: Sunil Shetty; Shabbir Boxwala; Anup Gandhi
- Starring: Govinda; Suniel Shetty; Mahaakshay Chakraborty; Jaaved Jaaferi; Ravi Kishan
- Cinematography: T. Surendra Reddy
- Edited by: Ashok Honda
- Music by: Songs: Mika Singh; Shravan Sinha; Shamir Tandon; Background Score: Viju Shah
- Production company: Popcorn Motion Pictures
- Distributed by: Viacom 18 Motion Pictures
- Release date: 4 November 2011
- Running time: 110 mins
- Country: India
- Language: Hindi

Loot is a 2011 Hindi-language crime comedy film directed by Rajnish Raj Thakur, written by S.M. Sabir Firozabadi, and produced by Shabbir Boxwala and Anup Gandhi under the Popcorn Motion Pictures banner. The film stars Govinda, Suniel Shetty, Mahaakshay Chakraborty, Jaaved Jaaferi, Shweta Bhardwaj, and Ravi Kishan. It was released on 4 November 2011, to mixed reviews from critics and was a commercial failure. The film is a loose remake of the 2003 film, Crime Spree.

== Plot ==
Loot revolves around the misadventures of four criminals, comprising Builder, Pandit, Akbar, and Wilson, who work for one Batliwala. The four rogues are sent on a mission to Pattaya to rob a house filled with priceless valuables. However, the quartet soon discovers that the house they have been sent to rob belongs to a dreaded don named Lalla Bhatti, an unpleasant sod who doesn't think twice about breaking his own brother's arm for an unpaid debt. If robbing a don's residence was not enough, the quarter also managed to get in the way of a 'poetic' spouting intelligence agent VP Singh keeping tabs on the don, an underworld patriarch Khan, and an East Asian thug named Asif trying to trace his stolen car. Pretty soon, all the characters of the film are pulled into a cat-and-mouse game with each other, with some audio tapes containing some damning conversations being the prize of the game. In the climax, the quartet, with some help from a local hustler, Varinder and his moll Sharmili, manage to set off the bad guys against each other. But soon enough, it is revealed that Batliwala was behind the whole thing and wanted to set the quartet up to get revenge on his brother, who is now in jail because of them. The quartet manages to save themselves and hires Khan to murder Batliwala.

== Cast ==
- Govinda as Pandit
- Suniel Shetty as Builder
- Jaaved Jaaferi as Akbar Qureshi
- Mahaakshay Chakraborty as Wilson
- Ravi Kishan as V.P. Singh
- Shweta Bhardwaj as Tanya Sharma
- Mahesh Manjrekar as Lala Taufeeq Omar Bhatti
- Mika Singh as Varinder Yuvraaj Singh (VYS) (extended cameo appearance)
- Kim Sharma as Sharmili Siqueira (SMS)
- Dalip Tahil as Batliwala
- Prem Chopra as Khan
- Shehzad Khan as Lala's brother
- Razzak Khan as Razak
- Rakhi Sawant in an item number "Jawani Bank Loot Le"

== Production ==
The filming began in Summer 2008. It completed shooting in early 2010, and was expected to release in June 2010. The release date was then delayed, and postponed to Dussehra 2010. Though, due to financial problems, director Rajnish Thakur pushed back the release date. In September 2010, he announced that the film would be releasing in Diwali 2010. He revealed the official first look poster on 28 September 2011. The theatrical trailer was revealed on 10 October 2011, alongside Rascals in cinemas.

== Soundtrack ==
Loot

Soundtrack album by Mika Singh
- Released: 26 October 2011
- Recorded: yes
- Genre: Film soundtrack
- Label: T-Series

No.	Title	Singer(s)	Length
1.	"Jawani Bank Loot Le"	Mamta Sharma	4:33
2.	"Loot Loot"	Shravan Sinha	5:03
3.	"Saari Duniya Mere Ispe"	Mika Singh	4:08
4.	"Ek Pata Ya Do Pata Ke"	Kunal Ganjawala	4:56
5.	"Ajab Hulchul Si"	Kunal Ganjawala, Shaan, KK, Vasundhara Das, Pinky Chinoy	5:28

=== Reception ===
Joginder Tuteja of Bollywood Hungama give it 2 stars out of five and commented "As mentioned earlier, the music of Loot came with hardly any expectations due to which whatever little is offered does turn out to be a bonus element".
