= Ammaa Ki Boli =

2021 Hindi film

- Directed by: Narayan Chauhan
- Written by: Sajan Aggarwal
- Produced by: Mukesh Chaudhury; Zeeshan Ahmad; Gyan Sharma; Prakash Bharadwaj; Shivam Aggarwal; Pankaj Jaiswal
- Starring: Sanjay Mishra; Hrishitaa Bhatt; Zakir Hussain; Govind Namdev
- Cinematography: Saptarshi Pratim
- Edited by: Aseem Sinha
- Music by: Manoj Santoshi
- Release date: 30 August 2019
- Country: India
- Language: Hindi

Ammaa Ki Boli (transl. Mother's dialect/language) is an Indian Hindi language comedy drama film directed by Narayan Chauhan and produced by Amaash Films, Next Entertainment and Street Act Productions.

== Plot ==
The story revolves Rukmi who buys a scooter using his mother's money. Later, when his brothers and nephew find out that he bought a scooter using Amma's money, his wife Pramila tells him to throw away Amma out of his house. Amma decides to live in Munna's house. She remembers her young days and when she was living in Hari's house when she broke a cup. She dies in Munna's house. Her daughter Kalavati and daughter in law Tarla steal her jewellery. In Amma's funeral, Hari blames the pandit that he stole the jewellery and beats him.

== Cast ==
- Sanjay Mishra as Rukmi
- Hrishitaa Bhatt as Pramila
- Zakir Hussain as Hari
- Govind Namdev as Parmu
- Farrukh Jaffar as Amma
- Anupam Shyam as Tiwari Ji
- Sitaram Panchal as Jeetu
- Himani Shivpuri as Kalavati
- Jugnu Ishiqui as Tarla
- Ishtiyak Khan as Munna
- Shravani Goswami as Bimla
- Nitu Pandey as young Amma
- Sheela Sharma as Kamla
- Sangeeta Tiwari as Sarla
- Shekhar Singh as Laxman
- Priya Patil as Urmila
