= Anushka Sen =

Indian actress (born 2002)

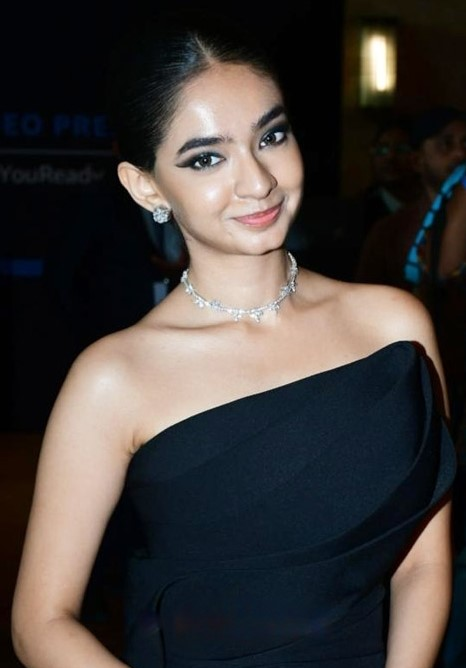
- Sen in 2024
- Born: 4 August 2002 (age 24); Ranchi, Jharkhand, India
- Education: Ryan International School; Thakur College of Science and Commerce
- Occupation: Actress
- Years active: 2009–present
- Known for: Baalveer; Jhansi Ki Rani; Khatron Ke Khiladi 11; Dil Dosti Dilemma

Anushka Sen (born 4 August 2002) is an Indian actress. She is well-known for her work in Baalveer, Jhansi Ki Rani, Fear Factor: Khatron Ke Khiladi 11, and Dil Dosti Dilemma.

== Early life ==
Anushka Sen was born on 4 August 2002, in Ranchi in a Bengali Baidya family, and later moved to Mumbai along with her family. She studied at Ryan International School, Kandivali, and scored 89.4% in the higher secondary education CBSE board exams as a commerce student. Later, she pursued a degree in filmography at Thakur College of Science and Commerce, Mumbai.

== Career ==
Sen began her career as a child actor in 2009 with Zee TV's serial Yahan Main Ghar Ghar Kheli. In the same year, her first music video Humko hai Aasha was released.

In 2012, she became popular for playing the character of Meher in Sab TV's Baalveer. In 2015, she appeared in the Bollywood film Crazy Cukkad Family.

She has acted in TV serials Internet Wala Love and Devon Ke Dev...Mahadev. She also appeared in the period drama film Lihaaf: The Quilt, and acted in a short film Sammaditthi. She has also appeared in several music videos.

She is known for playing the historical character Manikarnika Rao a.k.a. Rani Lakshmi Bai in the 2019 series Khoob Ladi Mardaani – Jhansi Ki Rani. In 2020, she was a lead in Zee TV's Apna Time Bhi Aayega but left after three weeks.

In 2021, she entered the stunt-based reality TV show Fear Factor: Khatron Ke Khiladi 11 and was eliminated in the seventh week. She was the youngest contestant to appear on this show.

In 2023, she was appointed as the Honorary Ambassador of Korean Tourism. She is also shooting for her first Korean film, titled Asia.

In 2024, she starred as Asmara in Amazon Prime Video's teen drama Dil Dosti Dilemma. She will next be seen in JioHotstar's musical drama series Hai Junoon! Dream. Dare. Dominate..

In March 2025, she starred in the webseries Kill Dill – The Heartbreak Club and played a bold character who tries solving mystery of her sister's disappearance while going through the dark secrets of the college. She was also featured in the soundtrack. In November, she started her career in the music by releasing her debut single "Chameleon", produced by Ken Lewis. The track was recorded earlier during her U.S. tour.

== Filmography ==
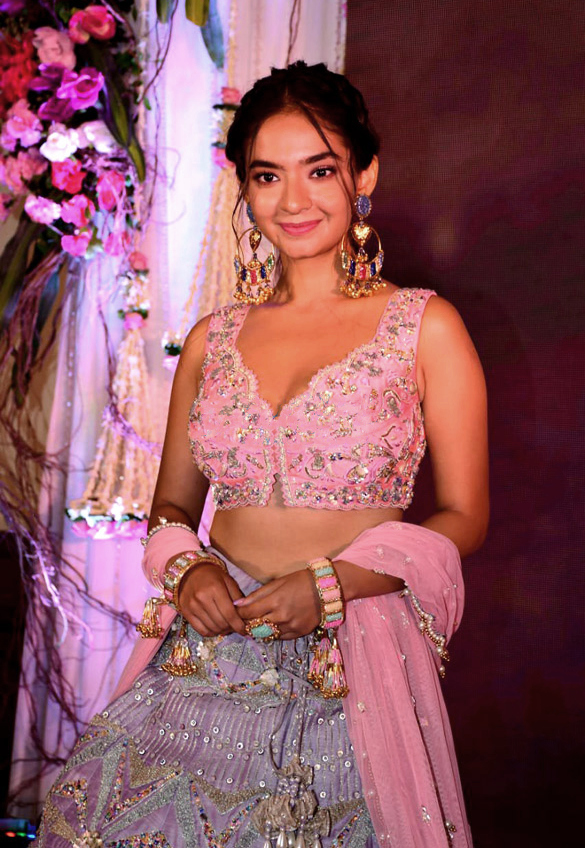
Sen in 2022

=== Films ===
Year	Title	Role	Notes	Ref.
2015	Crazy Cukkad Family	Unnamed		
2019	Lihaaf: The Quilt	Young Ismat Chughtai		
2019	Sammaditthi	Bittu	Short film	
2023	Am I Next	Honey		

=== Television ===
Year	Title	Role	Notes	Ref.
2009	Yahan Main Ghar Ghar Kheli	Misti		
2011	Devon Ke Dev...Mahadev	Child Parvati		
2012	Fear Files: Darr Ki Sacchi Tasvirein	Unnamed	Season 1; Episode 13	
2012–2016	Baalveer	Meher Dagli / Baal Sakhi		
2013	Comedy Circus Ke Mahabali	Child comedian	Cameo appearance	
2016	Comedy Nights Bachao Taaza	Child comedian	Cameo appearance	
2018	Internet Wala Love	Diya Verma		
2019	Jhansi Ki Rani	Manikarnika "Manu" Rao		
2020	Apna Time Bhi Aayega	Rani Singh Rajawat	18 episodes	
2021	Fear Factor: Khatron Ke Khiladi 11	Contestant	9th place	

=== Web series ===
Year	Title	Role	Ref.
2021	Crashh	Jia/Alia Mehra	
2022	Swaanng	Muskaan	
2024	Dil Dosti Dilemma	Asmara	
2025	Kill Dill – The Heartbreak Club	Kisha	
2025	Hai Junoon!	Charulaxmi Iyer	

=== Music video appearances ===
Year	Title	Singer(s)	Ref.
2019	"Gal Karke"	Asees Kaur	
2020	"Superstar"	Neha Kakkar and Vibhor Parashar	
2020	"Pyar Naal"	Vibhor Parashar	
2020	"Meri Hai Maa"	Tarsh	
2020	"Aaina"	Monali Thakur and Ranajoy Bhattacharjee	
2021	"Teri Aadat"	Abhi Dutt	
2021	"Chura Liya"	Sachet–Parampara	
2021	"Choorha"	Nikk	
2022	"Mast Nazron Se"	Jubin Nautiyal	
2022	"Is This That Feeling"	Shekhar Ravjiani	
2023	"Teri Aadat 2"	Abhi Dutt	

== Awards and nominations ==
Year	Award	Category	Work	Result	Ref.
2022	Indian Television Academy Awards	Popular Actress – Web	Crashh	Nominated	
2024	Filmfare OTT Awards	Best Actor in a Series (Female): Comedy	Dil Dosti Dilemma	Nominated	
