= Ashmith Kunder =

Film editor

- Born: Mumbai, Maharashtra, India
- Occupations: Film editor, film producer, actor
- Years active: 2000–present
- Relatives: Shirish Kunder (brother); Farah Khan (sister-in-law)

Ashmith Kunder is an Indian film editor, film producer, and actor. He is best known for editing films, including Dasavatharam (2008), Shor in the City (2010), Matrubhoomi: A Nation Without Women (2003). He debuted as an actor in the Amazon Prime original series, The Family Man. He became a producer with Babumoshai Bandookbaaz in 2017 starring Nawazuddin Siddiqui. He has also produced the film The Comedian, starring Satish Kaushik in his last title role.

== Early life ==
Kunder was born in Mumbai, Maharashtra. He is an engineer by education (B.E. Instrumentation) from Mumbai University. His brother is Shirish Kunder and his sister-in-law is Farah Khan.

== Career ==
Kunder began his career in 2000 as an associate editor for the film Champion. He then went on to be an editor for several films including 88 Antop Hill (2003), Mumbai Xpress (2005), Ghatothkach (2008), Lamhaa (2010), and Charlie Kay Chakkar Mein (2015). He was also a screenwriter and wrote the script for Tees Maar Khan, which was directed by Farah Khan.

In 2017, Kunder collaborated with Kushan Nandy and produced a film called Babumoshai Bandookbaaz a film that showcases the life and times of a contract executioner, Babu, played by Nawazuddin Siddiqui.

Kunder was the lead actor in the Hindi feature film Agam, where he plays the character of an Aghori Tantrik. The film was selected for the 37th Cairo International Film Festival.

== Filmography ==
Year	Film	Role
2000	Champion	Associate Editor
2001	Yeh Raaste Hain Pyaar Ke	Associate Editor
2002	Aankhen	Associate Editor
2002	Koi Mere Dil Se Poochhe	Associate Editor
2002	Na Tum Jaano Na Hum	Associate Editor
2003	Calcutta Mail	Associate Editor
2003	Sandhya	Associate Editor
2003	88 Antop Hill	Film editor
2003	Matrubhoomi	Film editor
2004	Kis Kis Ki Kismat	Film editor
2005	Hum Dum	Film editor
2005	Hum Dum	Sound editor
2005	Mumbai Xpress	Film editor
2008	Ghatothkach	Film editor
2008	Ghatothkach	Additional writer
2008	Kabhi Socha Na Tha	Film editor
2008	Dasavathaaram	Film editor
2010	Lamhaa	Film editor
2010	Shor in the City	Additional writer
2010	Tees Maar Khan	Screenplay
2010	Tees Maar Khan	Dialogues
2011	Hidden	Film editor
2011	Avant Garde Pythagoras Sharma	Film editor
2015	Charlie Kay Chakkar Mein	Film editor
2017	Babumoshai Bandookbaaz	Film Producer
2017	Babumoshai Bandookbaaz	Film editor
2017	Agam	Actor
2019	Mirror O Mirror	Actor
2019	The Family Man	Actor
2020	It Happened In Calcutta	Actor
2021	Crimes and Confessions	Actor
2023	Guns & Gulaabs	Actor
2023	Parikrama	Actor
2023	The Comedian	Producer

== Television series ==
Year	Film	Role	Director	Network	Notes
2019	The Family Man	Bilal	Raj Nidimoru and Krishna D.K.	Amazon Prime Video	Web Series
