= Sachin Sudhakaran and Hariharan Muralidharan =

Indian sound designer duo

- Education: SAE Institute, Chennai
- Occupations: sound designers; sound effects editors; sound editors
- Years active: 2012–present
- Awards: National Film Award (2025); Filmfare Award (2024); IIFA Award (2024)
- Website: synccinema.co.in

Sachin Sudhakaran and Hariharan Muralidharan are an Indian sound designer duo known for their work in South Indian cinema. Active across Tamil, Telugu, Malayalam, and Hindi films, they have contributed to over 200 feature films. The duo jointly received the National Film Award, Filmfare Award, and IIFA Award for Best Sound Design for the Hindi film Animal.Their notable works include Dhuruvangal Pathinaaru, Kaithi, Arjun Reddy, Vikram Vedha, Vikram, Hridayam, Kabir Singh and Animal.

== Early life ==
Sachin Sudhakaran was born in India and raised in Muscat, Oman, where he attended Indian School Muscat (ISM). In an interview, Sudhakaran stated that his time at the school helped nurture his creative interests. After returning to India, he earned a Bachelor of Technology degree from Model Engineering College, Kochi, and later pursued a Diploma in Sound Engineering at School of Audio Engineering (SAE) Institute, Chennai, to begin a career in sound design.

Hariharan Muralidharan, who grew up in Bengaluru, Karnataka, developed a passion for audio technology, rock music and live performances during his formative years. He went on to study sound engineering at the SAE Institute, Chennai, where he met Sudhakaran and began a long-term professional collaboration.

== Career ==
After completing their studies, Sudhakaran and Muralidharan began working together in Tamil and Malayalam cinema. They made their debut as sound effects editors on Pizza (2012), followed by Ee Adutha Kalath (2012) and Left Right Left (2013), handling foley and sound effects. They later worked on Dhag (2014), a Marathi film that won multiple National Film Awards, and Chaar Sahibzaade (2014), a Punjabi Animated film honoured at PTC Punjabi Film Awards that year. During this period, Sudhakaran also worked independently as the sound effects editor for the Italian film The Invisible Boy (2014).

Muralidharan trained under sound engineer M.R Rajakrishnan at Four Frames Sound Company before transitioning fully into sound design.

The duo's early sound design credits include Sutta Kadhai (2013), Yennai Arindhal (2015), 10 Endrathukulla (2015) and Maya (2015), which earned critical praise for its immersive soundscape.

In 2016, they founded Sync Cinema, a post-production sound studio in Chennai.

That year, they worked on the Kannada film U Turn (2016), which received critical acclaim for its innovative use of sound in narrative storytelling. It was followed by Dhuruvangal Pathinaaru (2016). a Tamil neo-noir thriller, that was both a critical and commercial success. M Suganth of The Times of India noted that "with help from his cinematographer Sujith Sarang and his sound team (sound designers Sachin Sudhakaran and Hari Haran of Sync Cinema and audiographer Raja Krishnan), Karthick turns this investigative thriller into an immersive experience for the viewer". Their early success coincided with a broader trend among emerging filmmakers who increasingly emphasized the narrative potential of sound in cinema.

Their work on Maanagaram (2017), Vikram Vedha (2017), and Arjun Reddy (2017) established them as leading sound designers in the South Indian film industry. Ratsasan (2018), was particularly praised for its sound design, which contributed significantly in building the film's psychological tension. Critics highlighted the atmospheric detail of the audio work, describing it as one of the film's most impressive technical aspects.

In Game Over (2019), critics commended the duo's atmospheric sound design, with the reviews describing it as "terrific", "pulsating" and "unsettling". That year, they also worked on Kaithi and Nerkonda Paarvai, both of which were commercially and critically successful, and along with Game Over, were included in The News Minute's list of best Tamil films of 2019. Their work in 2019 also included large-scale productions like Kabir Singh, Saaho and Sye Raa Narasimha Reddy, on which they served as sound designers. Composer Sam CS acknowledged the duo’s contribution in creating ambient sound layers and effects for films such as Kaithi, crediting Sync Cinema, for its role in shaping a cohesive sound mix that complement the score.

In 2021, their sound design for Marakkar: Lion of the Arabian Sea was noted for its technical excellence, while Garuda Gamana Vrishabha Vahana was acclaimed for its seamless integration of score and sound design. Their work on Rocky, a neo-noir action received widespread critical acclaim for its intense and visceral soundscape. Ashameera Aiyappan of Firstpost observed that "music and sound blend in and out to create a chilling sensory experience."

The following year, they designed the sound for the action-thriller Valimai, noted for its detailed soundscape despite mixed critical reception. Speaking to Cinema Express, Muralidharan explained that the team had recorded the sounds of numerous bikes, superbikes and dirtbikes to create an authentic auditory experience for the film's racing sequences. That year, Sudhakaran also worked individually on the Telugu short film Manasanamaha, which received international recognition for its narrative structure and technical execution. The short went on to win multiple awards at international film festivals, earning Sudhakaran recognition for his contribution in sound design. The film holds the Guinness World Record for winning the most awards for a short film. They also worked on the Tamil web series Suzhal: The Vortex (2022), which used sync sound recording.

Sudhakaran and Muralidharan subsequently designed sound for a series of commercially successful and technically acclaimed films, including Vikram (2022), Hit:The Second Case (2022), Love Today (2022), Leo (2023), RDX (2023) and Animal (2023). Their work on Animal brought them wider recognition, earning the duo the Filmfare Award, IIFA Award, and National Film Award for Best Sound Design. The film also received honours for the Best Background Score and a Special Mention for Re-recording, making it one of the few productions to win across all major sound categories at the National Film Awards.

Since then they have continued to work on several high-profile productions across languages including Parking (2023), Captain Miller (2024), ARM (2024), Devara: Part 1 (2024), Vettaiyan (2024), Bazooka (2025), Kingdom (2025), Coolie (2025), and They Call Him OG (2025).

== Selected filmography ==
Since 2012, Sudhakaran and Muralidharan have worked on over 200 feature films and several television series across Tamil, Malayalam, Telugu, and Hindi cinema. The following is a selected list of their notable works:

=== Films ===
Year	Title	Language	Role	Notes
2012	Pizza	Tamil	Sound Effects Editors	Debut as sound effects editors
2012	Ee Adutha Kaalathu	Malayalam	Sound Effects Editors	Debut film in Malayalam
2013	Left Right Left	Malayalam	Sound Effects Editors	
2013	Sutta Kadhai	Tamil	Sound Designers	Debut as Sound Designers
2014	Dhag	Marathi	Sound Effects Editors	National Film Award winning film
2014	The Invisible Boy	Italian	Sound Effects Editors	European Film Academy Young Audience Award Winner
2014	Chaar Sahibzaade	Punjabi	Sound Effects Editors	
2015	Maya	Tamil	Sound Designers	
2016	Guppy	Malayalam	Sound Designers	Kerala State Award winning film
2016	U Turn	Kannada	Sound Designers	Debut film in Kannada
2016	Dhuruvangal Pathinaaru	Tamil	Sound Designers	
2016	Maanagaram	Tamil	Sound Designers	
2017	Vikram Vedha	Tamil	Sound Designers	
2017	Arjun Reddy	Telugu	Sound Designers	Debut film in Telugu
2018	Rangasthalam	Telugu	Sound Designers	
2018	Ratsasan	Tamil	Sound Designers	
2018	Imaikkaa Nodigal	Tamil	Sound Designers	
2018	Maari 2	Tamil	Sound Designers	
2019	Game Over	Tamil	Sound Designers	
2019	Jersey	Telugu	Sound Designers	
2019	Kaithi	Tamil	Sound Designers	
2019	Kabir Singh	Hindi	Sound Designers	
2019	Dear Comrade	Telugu	Sound Designers	
2019	Helen	Malayalam	Sound Designers	
2019	Nerkonda Paarvai	Tamil	Sound Designers	
2019	Saaho	Telugu,Hindi	Sound Designers	
2020	Varane Avashyamund	Malayalam	Sound Designers	
2020	Hit: The First Case	Telugu	Sound Designers	
2020	Mafia: Chapter 1	Tamil	Sound Designers	
2021	Rocky	Tamil	Sound Designers	
2021	Master	Tamil	Sound Designers	
2021	Marakkar: Lion of the Arabian Sea	Malayalam	Sound Designers	National Film Award winning film
2021	Garuda Gamana Vrishabha Vahana	Kannada	Sound Designers	
2022	Hridayam	Malayalam	Sound Designers	
2022	Valimai	Tamil	Sound Designers	
2022	Vikram	Tamil	Sound Designers	
2022	Manasanamaha	Telugu	Sound Designer	Credited individually (Sachin Sudhakaran); Guinness World Record winning short film
2022	Saani Kaayidham	Tamil	Sound Designers	
2022	HIT: The Second Case	Telugu	Sound Designers	
2022	Connect	Tamil	Sound Designers	
2023	Leo	Tamil	Sound Designers	
2023	Animal	Hindi	Sound Designers	National, Filmfare and IIFA Award winning work
2023	Por Thozhil	Tamil	Sound Designers	
2023	Pookkaalam	Malayalam	Sound Designers	
2023	RDX	Malayalam	Sound Designers	
2023	Parking	Tamil	Sound Designers	
2024	Captain Miller	Tamil	Sound Designers	
2024	ARM	Malayalam	Sound Designers	
2024	Vettaiyan	Malayalam	Sound Designers	
2024	Devara	Telugu	Sound Designers	
2024	Amaran	Tamil	Sound Designers	
2024	Nirangal Moondru	Tamil	Sound Designers	
2025	Dragon	Tamil	Sound Designers	
2025	HIT: The Third Case	Telugu	Sound Designers	
2025	Bazooka	Malayalam	Sound Designers	
2025	Maareesan	Tamil	Sound Designers	
2025	Kingdom	Telugu	Sound Designers	
2025	Coolie	Tamil	Sound Designers	
2025	Dude	Tamil	Sound Designers	
2025	They Call Him OG	Telugu	Sound Designers	

=== Television ===
Year	Title	Language	Distributor	Notes
2018	Vella Raja	Tamil	Amazon Prime Video	2 episodes
2021	Kudi Yedamaithe	Telugu	Aha	
2021	Navarasa	Tamil	Netflix	S1.E3 - Project Agni: Adbhuta S1.E7 - Inmai: Bhaya
2022	Vadhandhi: The Fable of Velonie	Tamil	Amazon Prime Video	
2023	Story of Things	Tamil	SonyLIV	

== Accolades ==
- 71st National Film Awards (2025): Best Sound Design, win for Animal
- 69th Filmfare Awards (2024): Best Sound Design, win (as Sync Cinema) for Animal
- 24th IIFA Awards (2024): Best Sound Design, win for Animal
- Guinness World Records (2022): Record for most awards won by a short film for Manasanamaha (Sachin Sudhakaran credited as Sound Designer)
