= Black Home =

- Promotional poster
- Directed by: Ashish Deo
- Produced by: Shri Vijay Kamble
- Starring: Ashutosh Rana; Chitrashi Rawat; Murli Sharma; Achint Kaur
- Cinematography: Shailesh Awasthi
- Edited by: Anand Diwan
- Music by: Akshay Hariharan; Sahil Sultanpuri (lyrics)
- Production company: Samajik Samata Manch Film Company
- Release date: 20 March 2015
- Running time: 105 minutes
- Country: India
- Language: Hindi

Black Home is a 2015 Hindi social drama thriller film produced by Shri Vijay Kamble and co-produced by Mahesh R. Salunke under the banner Samajik Samata Manch Film Company. The film is written & directed by Ashish Deo. The film sheds light on the gruesome living conditions and the violence faced by minor girls in Rajawadi Remand Home. It's a research based film inspired by true incidents with a lot of information from news papers and real life interviews of girls from the remand home to better understand the intensity of the subject. The music for the film is scored by Akshay Hariharan and lyrics are penned by Sahil Sultanpuri. The soundtrack was released in September 2013. Akshay Hariharan, son of noted Tamil singer Hariharan debuted in this film.

== Plot ==
Rajawadi Remand Home is in lot of controversy because of many illegal activities. DK, a news channel bureau chief, wants to bring out the facts. Amidst channel politics, he appoints a newbie journalist Anjali to expose the racket and the dark side of the society shows its ugly face. It unfolds so many cruel realities of the crime & politics, which go ignored. The system is, however, not so easy to expose.

The film attempts to highlight the harsh situations faced by kids in remand homes.

== Impact ==
Juvenile Act is implied for the betterment of children's future. But unfortunately the reality is unimaginable. The child, who comes to the remand home, is not criminal always. It is most of the time an unwanted child of the house or the parents are poor to raise this child.

This film is a sincere effort to reveal the reality of these remand home girls in front of the society and make the society aware of the facts that these children lead a life worse than hell. We are part of this society, where we live a very secure life but the other side of the society is very dark, like a BLACK HOME.

=== Issues highlighted ===
- India stands 3rd in the world for rape.
- Every 20 min a girl is raped in India.
- 5 lakh children are forced into sex trade every year.
- Out of 12 million girls born in India, 1 million girls do not see their first birthday.

== Cast ==
- Ashutosh Rana
- Chitrashi Rawat
- Ashmita
- Murli Sharma
- Simran Sehmi
- Sharad Ponkshe
- Achint Kaur
- Amit Behl
- Mohan Joshi
- Santosh Juvekar
- Raju Kher
- Neelu Kohli

== Credits ==
Banner: Samajik Samata Manch Film Company

Producer: Vijay Kamble

Co producer: Mahesh R. Salunke

Story, Screenplay, Dialogues & Direction: Ashish Deo

Line Producer: Salim Khultabadkar

Music Director: Akshay Hariharan

Lyricist: Sahil Sultanpuri

Singers: Asha Bhosle, A. Hariharan, Suraj Jagan

Cinematographer: Shailesh Awasthi

Action: Allan Amin

Editor: Anand Diwan

Choreography: Swarup Medara

Background Music: Amar Mohile

Art Director: Deepak Chakrabarty

PRO : Prem Jhangiyani, Pradnya Shetty

== Music ==
No.	Title	Singer(s)	Length
1.	"Tu Aadi Hai"	Asha Bhosle, Yadnesh Raikar	4:30
2.	"Kaanha Mose"	Hariharan	4:37
3.	"Mann Hai Bheega"	Suraj Jagan	4:32
4.	"Mann Hai Bheega (Sad)"	Akshay Hariharan	3:09
Total length:			16:48
