= Teen Do Paanch =

- Written by: Mehran Amrohi, Shruti Varma, Nishant Chaturvedi and Amitabh Varma
- Directed by: Amitabh Varma
- Starring: Shreyas Talpade; Bidita Bag; Brijendra Kala; Shantanu Anam; Akashdeep Arora; Sheeba Chadhdha; Akhilendra Mishra; Raj Singh bhamrah
- Music by: Amitabh S Varma; Kamlesh Shamania; Adrijo; Lyrics: Amitabh varma
- Country of origin: India
- Original language: Hindi

Production
- Producers: Faqhrul Husaini; Mehran Amrohi
- Cinematography: Ankit Arya
- Editor: Suraj Gunjal
- Running time: 10-15 minutes

Original release
- Release: 7 May – 19 May 2021

Teen Do Paanch is an Indian miniseries produced by Smiley Films. It features Shreyas Talpade as Vishal and Bidita Bag as Priyanka as an urban couple lives in Delhi NCR (New Okhla). They want to have a kid but could not conceive after 7 years of married life so they opt for adoption but their lives turn upside down when they end up adopting three kids.Now a couple who wanted one child in their life has three. And after couple of months, excitement or the shock becomes double when the come to know Priyanka is also pregnant. She delivers twins. Now this couple has five kids.

== Plot ==
A couple Vishal and Priyanka is in their 30’s, reside in Noida. Both are educated and professionals. But since some time Priyanka has left her job to low down the city stress level, as they want to conceive a baby now. Despite having a good health they do not conceive and finally plan to adopt a baby. They go to an orphanage, finalize a baby girl of 4 years and start getting the paperwork done. But they soon come to know that they can’t adopt that baby girl as this girl is one baby out of a triplet and as they have already lost their parents, now orphanage doesn’t want them to get separated furthermore. So they will give this child to a couple who will take all three together otherwise the orphanage can take care of them. Vishal has to bow down in front of priyanka's wish and ends up adopting all three. Now a couple who wanted one child in their life has three. The story doesn’t end here. After couple of months, the excitement or the shock becomes double when they come to know that Priyanka is pregnant. She delivers twins. Now this couple has five kids. How these five kids make them go through all the lows and highs is the fun filled story of our film "Teen Do Paanch". Do they continue to live with the adopted kids? Or Do the three adopted ones go? This is what forms the rest of the story.

== Cast ==
- Shreyas Talpade as Vishal Sahu
- Bidita Bag as Priyanka Sahu
- Shantanu Anam Kartik
- Brijendra Kala as Gambhir
- Akashdeep Arora as Sushant
- Sheeba Chadhdha as Priyanka's Mother
- Akhilendra Mishra as Madhav Sahu
- Lovleen Mishra as Vishal's Mother
- Shanaya Rai as Divya
- Rannanjay Pratap Singh as Ajay
- Ransh Mathur as Aalok
- Priya Gupta as Kanchan
- Raj Singh Bhamrah as Chemist

== Production ==
Shooting of the mini-series took place in Noida Gautam Budh Nagar, Uttar Pradesh in 2019 and post production was completed in spring 2020. The film was noted as a shift in the acting career of Bidita Bag, who was so far "best known for tough characters in The Sholay Girl, Babumoshai Bandookbaaz, and Abhay" and thus "had a change of pace. The actress was recently seen in the comedy-drama Teen Do Paanch alongside Shreyas Talpade", which showed her wish of making more commercial films.

== Release ==
The film was made available on Disney+Hotsar in May 2021.

== Reception ==
The miniseries was panned in a review for The Times of India, titled "Teen Do Paanch season 1 (...) : an inept take on adoption with poor performances and weak script". Another review was less negative but insisted nonetheless on the forthcomings induced by the format chosen: "There is no denying that Teen Do Paanch would have worked better as a feature film. Watching over a dozen episodes of 10 minutes each can be a little exasperating."
