= Riddhi Kumar =

Indian actress

- Born: Kopargaon, Shirdi, Maharashtra
- Occupation: Actress
- Years active: 2018–present

Riddhi Kumar is an Indian actress who works in Hindi, Telugu, Marathi and Malayalam films and web series, she made her feature film debut with the Telugu romance Lover (2018) and has since appeared in web series Candy (2021), Crash Course, Human (2022) , Hack Crimes Online, as well as in several pan-Indian projects, gaining attention on both the festival circuit and in commercial cinema.

She made her acting debut with the Telugu film Lover (2018). She then made her Malayalam debut with Pranaya Meenukalude Kadal (2019) and her Marathi debut with Kadhipatta (2025).

== Early life ==
Riddhi Kumar was born in Kopargaon, near Shirdi, Maharashtra, into an Army family; her father is an officer in the Indian Army. She graduated with a bachelor’s degree in Philosophy from Fergusson College, Pune. Before entering films, she began her career in modelling and pageantry, participating in fashion shows and regional beauty contests, which eventually led her to acting.

== Career ==
Kumar made her acting debut in 2018 with the Telugu film Lover opposite Raj Tarun. The same year, she appeared in the telugu film Anaganaga O Premakatha opposite Viraj Ashwin.

In 2019, she made her Malayalam film debut with Pranaya Meenukalude Kadal alongside Vinayakan and Dileesh Pothan.

Riddhi Kumar has also featured in a popular Cadbury Dairy Milk advertisement.

Riddhi made her web debut with the Hindi series Candy alongside Ronit Roy and Richa Chaddha. In 2022, she appeared in the Hindi series Human alongside Shefali Shah and Kirti Kulhari.

She then appeared in the 2022 Telugu-Hindi bilingual Radhe Shyam alongside Prabhas.

Riddhi has appeared in the Hindi web series Crash Course alongside Annu Kapoor. She will also appear in the Malayalam film Chethi Mandaram Thulasi opposite Sunny Wayne.

Riddhi Kumar portrays Mallika in Superboys of Malegaon, a heartfelt tribute to small-town cinema dreams, directed by Reema Kagti.

She also made her Marathi film debut in 2025 with Kadhi Patta opposite Bhushan Patil.

Riddhi Kumar will be seen as one of the leading heroines Prabhas in The Raja Saab, a multilingual romantic-horror film directed by Maruthi.

== Awards and nominations ==
She was nominated for the Indian Television Academy (ITA) Awards alongside Rasika Dugal and Shabana Azmi in the Best Supporting Actress – Drama (OTT) category for her role in Candy.

== Filmography ==
Key
†	Denotes films that have not yet been released

=== Films ===
Year	Title	Role	Language	Notes	Ref.
2018	Lover	Charita	Telugu		
2018	Anaganaga O Premakatha	Ananya	Telugu		
2019	Pranaya Meenukalude Kadal	Jasmine	Malayalam		
2019	Dandam	Priya	Marathi		
2022	Radhe Shyam	Tara	Telugu	Bilingual film	
2022	Radhe Shyam	Tara	Hindi	Bilingual film	
2022	Salaam Venky	Sharda Prasad Krishnan	Hindi		
2025	Superboys of Malegaon	Mallika	Hindi		
2025	Kadhipatta	Meera	Marathi		
2026	The RajaSaab	Anitha	Telugu		

=== Television ===
Year	Title	Role	Notes	Ref.
2021	Candy	Kalki Rawat		
2022	Human	Deepali		
2022	Crash Course	Shanaya Qazi		
2023	Hack Crimes Online	Shakti		
