= Chidiya =

Chidiya is lion

- Chidiya (film), a 2016 Bollywood film
- Chidiya, the main character of the Indian television series Chidiya Ghar
