= Tiger by the Tail (Chase novel) =

1954 novel

Tiger By the Tail
- Book Cover
- Author: James Hadley Chase
- Language: English
- Publisher: Robert Hale
- Publication date: 1954
- Publication place: United Kingdom
- ISBN: 9780709138365

Tiger by the Tail is a 1954 thriller novel written by British author James Hadley Chase. There are several films based on this book.

== Synopsis ==
Banker Ken Holland, encouraged by his close friend Parker, throws caution to the winds and decides to visit a hooker when his wife Ann is away, despite his conscience warning him not to, and when the hooker is murdered mysteriously in her apartment, soon gets into a muddle with gangsters, hard boiled elements, police and politicians which he is left to deal with.

== Plot ==
Ken Holland is advised by colleague Parker to spend time with a hooker named Fay Carson as his wife Ann is away. Fay Carson and Ken enjoy each other's company throughout the evening, and Fay introduces him to her acquaintances at the bar as well, including the owner Sam Darcy and an ex pal Gilda Dorman, who leaves soon after. That night on returning to her apartment Fay is murdered silently by an unknown assailant with an ice pick. Ken wipes all his traces and flees the apartment in terror. Fay's neighbor Mr Raphael Sweeting, a small time offender looking for a big break, always carrying a pet Pekinese dog with him, sees Ken. Soon the police and politicians in California are on the case. The police find no reason to suspect Ken or Parker. Parker tells Ken not to ever mention his name regarding Fay.

Lieutenant Harry Adams and Sergeant Donovan are put on the case, each trying to solve it to advance their careers. Police commissioner Paul Howard and his despised brother-in-law Captain of police Motley are not in good terms, and Motley has married his glamorous sister Gloria to Howard only to get Howard to toe the line, for promotion. Howard tells Adams to carry on with his own investigations.

Howard visits Sean O'Brien, an ex drug peddler from France, now turned politician who is going to marry Gilda Dorman, the sister of Fay's ex-boyfriend Johnny Dorman who once assaulted Fay. Howard warns O'Brien that his reputation is at stake if Fay's building activities (which is actually a brothel) owned by O'Brien, come to light. It is strongly suspected that Johnny is back in California and has murdered Fay. O'Brien evicts the building and kidnaps Johnny with his henchmen Tux and Solly, keeping him in seclusion in a cruiser named Willow Point.

Local goon Paradise Louie tries to blackmail Gilda for sex in exchange for his silence, as he claims Johnny visited him for Fay's whereabouts and this information can lead to Johnny's arrest; but O'Brien learns of it and gets Louie fatally assaulted by Tux and Solly. Sweeting follows Ken to blackmail him for his silence in the case. But Ken just throws him out and finally decides to confess his deeds to the cops. Donovan and subordinate detective Duncan search Ken's house and conclude Ken is the killer, with Donovan issuing a look out notice for him.

Ken fortunately meets Adams and tells his entire story, and Adams gives him shelter at his own house from the cops, knowing that if he is arrested, O'Brien being may try to make Ken the fall guy to save his future brother-in-law Johnny from the electric chair. He also learns of Louie and takes his statement as he is dying in hospital, regarding Tux and Solly. Unknown to Adams yet, O'Brien actually contemplates eliminating Johnny as he is a nuisance. Adams visits a shady hotel named Washington to find Yarde but only finds Yarde's empty room ransacked.

Ken learns that Johnny is in Willow Point and goes there himself to investigate without informing Adams, finding a boat with help of Rose Little, a salesgirl at the amusement arcade on the shore, on time to see O'Brien meeting Johnny there at Willow point, asking him to write a letter to Gilda saying he is going to Paris for a few days, promising him a flight to Paris for his safety, and then leaving the cruiser. Ken learns that O'Brien wants Tux to kill Johnny and dispose him at sea. He frantically jumps in to warn Johnny but both are attacked by Tux, and in the ensuing fight, Tux is knocked out by Johnny. The two scamper away but soon cops find Ken and begin to chase them. They are given shelter by Rose Little unexpectedly, who nurses Johnny's wounds. Adams questions Sweeting, and he says Gilda's ex boyfriend Maurice Yarde may be the killer as he saw Yarde threatening Fay a few months ago when they broke up. When Adams leaves, Sweeting gets the idea of blackmailing Gilda for money. He visits her apartment but Gilda threatens him with a gun; he tells her about Johnny and Yarde, after which she gives him twenty dollars and turns him out. But Sweeting sneaks back inside Gilda's house at night and discovers Yarde's dead body in Gilda's refrigerator.

The police pursue Johnny and Ken, Tux and Solly arrive in search of Johnny and learn he is in Rose's apartment. Johnny and Rose advise Ken to leave immediately, with Johnny giving Ken Gilda's address, saying she will help him. Tux and Solly find Rose's house but are met with cops who shoot Solly and injure Tux, but he manages to get into the apartment and strangle Rose and shoot Johnny, as police arrive and shoot Tux as well.

Ken leaves a phone message for Adams saying he is at Gilda's house and runs to Gilda's apartment and tries to explain everything including O'Brien's treachery, but Gilda turns on him with her gun, accusing him of being Fay's killer. Motley informs O'Brien that his henchmen and Johnny have been killed and O'Brien proceeds to Gilda's apartment to lie again about Johnny. Inspector Adams arrives at the apartment too and at this point it is revealed by him that the real killer is Gilda Dorman, and he has obtained enough evidence to jail her. Gilda was already married to Yarde 13 months back and she divorced him, but Yarde and Fay Carson knew about it and were blackmailing her with revealing this to O'Brien. Hence she ransacked Yarde's apartment and destroyed the divorce papers, entered Fay's apartment and killed her, stabbed Yarde and hid the body in the refrigerator when he visited her. It is then seen that Sweeting has also been murdered by Gilda when he found Yarde's body in her refrigerator. O'Brien is shocked but still wants Adams to toe the line, telling him to leave Gilda and implicate Ken in the murders, to which Adams refuses. O'Brien threatens the duo at gunpoint saying he will make things look different, but Adams shoots him dead as Sweeting's Pekinese distracts O'Brien. Cornered Gilda jumps off her apartment floor and dies. Adams then tells Ken to just run back home as though nothing ever happened, because with all the evidence at hand, he won't be implicated at all.

The book ends with Lieutenant Harry Adams promoted as Captain of police, and a now courageous and confident Ken Holland, much to Parker's surprise, picking Ann from the railway station. As they arrive home, they find Raphael Sweeting's Pekinese dog at their doorstep.

== Critical response ==
Neil Baran, writing for the British newspaper Truth accused Chase of being predictable, but admitted that the book had a firm grip on the reader.

Australian critic Zelie McLeod writing for The Daily Telegraph noted “a slightly moralising atmosphere” of the book and compared the last chapter to some of Shakespeare's dramas due to “a tidy little massacre of almost everyone engaged in the plot”. The Farmer & Settler observed that the book follows the usual Chase's “pattern of sex, crime, fast living and improbability”.

== In film ==
Two films have been adapted from this book:

- The Man in the Raincoat, a 1957 French-Italian comedy-thriller directed by Julien Duvivier.
- 88 Antop Hill, a 2003 Indian murder mystery directed by Kushan Nandy.

== In literary research ==
Several literary critics noted that the novel follows the usual Chase theme of sexual obsessions of rather weak men, dominated and lured by femmes fatales.
