= Lover (2018 film) =

2018 film by Anish R. Krishna

- Theatrical release poster
- Directed by: Anish R. Krishna
- Written by: Anish R. Krishna; Swapawan Basamsetti; Bhargava Karthik
- Produced by: Dil Raju; Harshith Reddy
- Starring: Raj Tarun; Riddhi Kumar
- Cinematography: Sameer Reddy
- Edited by: Prawin Pudi
- Music by: Score: Jeevan Babu; Songs: Tanishk Bagchi; Ankit Tiwari; Arko Pravo Mukherjee; Rishi Rich; Sai Karthik; Ajay Vas
- Production company: Sri Venkateswara Creations
- Release date: 20 July 2018
- Running time: 130 minutes
- Country: India
- Language: Telugu

Lover is a 2018 Indian Telugu-language action romantic comedy film directed by Anish R. Krishna and produced by Dil Raju and Harshith Reddy, under Sri Venkateswara Creations. The film features Raj Tarun and debutant Riddhi Kumar in the lead roles. The film was released on 20 July 2018.

== Synopsis ==
Raj, a custom-bike maker, falls in love with Charitha, a responsible nurse. However, they face a challenge in love with Raj to a deadly conspiracy.

== Cast ==
- Raj Tarun as Raj
- Riddhi Kumar as Charita
- Sachin Khedekar
- Ajay as Bhai
- Rajiv Kanakala as Jaggu, Raj's brother
- Praveen as Praveen
- Satyam Rajesh as Nalla Seenu
- Rohini as Charita's mother
- Subbaraju
- Viva Raghav
- Satya as Balu
- Brijila Ragesh as Malavika

== Soundtrack ==
Lover

Soundtrack album by Tanishk Bagchi, Ankit Tiwari, Arko Pravo Mukherjee, Rishi Rich, Sai Karthik and Ajay Vas
- Released: 24 June 2018
- Recorded: 2018
- Genre: Feature film soundtrack
- Length: 27:46
- Language: Telugu
- Label: Aditya Music
External audio
- Audio Jukebox on YouTube

Track listing
No.	Title	Lyrics	Music	Singer(s)	Length
1.	"Naalo Chilipi Kala"	Sri Mani	Sai Karthik	Yazin Nizar	3:38
2.	"What A Ammayi"	Sri Mani	Arko Pravo Mukherjee	Sonu Nigam	3:45
3.	"Adbhutham"	Sri Mani	Tanishk Bagchi	Jubin Nautiyal, Ranjini Jose	3:36
4.	"Ramuni Banamla"	Sri Mani	Rishi Rich	Sai Charan	3:28
5.	"Anthe Kada Mari"	Sirivennela Seetharama Sastry	Ankit Tiwari	Ankit Tiwari, Jonita Gandhi	4:43
6.	"Yevaipuga Naa Choopu Saagali"	Sri Mani	Ankit Tiwari	Ankit Tiwari	8:36
Total length:					27:46

== Reviews ==
Times of India gave the film 3 out of 5 stars stating, "Raj Tarun and Riddhi Kumar's film is total eye candy".
