= Mumbai Xpress =

2005 film by Singeetam Srinivasa Rao

- Tamil theatrical release poster
- Directed by: Singeetham Srinivasa Rao
- Written by: Kamal Haasan; Saurabh Shukla (Hindi dialogues)
- Produced by: Kamal Haasan; Chandrahasan
- Starring: Kamal Haasan; Manisha Koirala
- Cinematography: Siddharth Ramaswamy
- Edited by: Ashmith Kunder
- Music by: Ilaiyaraaja
- Production company: Raaj Kamal Films International
- Release date: 14 April 2005
- Running time: 152 minutes (Tamil); 146 minutes (Hindi)
- Country: India
- Languages: Tamil; Hindi
- Budget: ₹4.50 crore
- Box office: ₹5.17 crore

Mumbai Xpress is a 2005 Indian black comedy film directed by Singeetham Srinivasa Rao and produced by Kamal Haasan. It stars Kamal Haasan himself in the lead role alongside Manisha Koirala. The music was composed by Ilaiyaraaja, while Siddharth Ramaswamy and Ashmith Kunder handled the cinematography and editing. The film was simultaneously shot in Tamil and Hindi. This was the first Indian censored film to be filmed in digital format.

The lead pair, as well as Sharat Saxena, Ramesh Aravind, Hardik Thakar, and Dheena, were retained for the Hindi version of the film; also, Vijay Raaz, Dinesh Lamba, Om Puri, Saurabh Shukla and Pratima Kazmi reprised the roles played by Pasupathy, Vaiyapuri, Nassar, Santhana Bharathi and Kovai Sarala in the Tamil version, respectively. The Tamil version of Mumbai Xpress was released on 14 April 2005, and the Hindi version the day after. Both versions were not successful at the box office.

== Plot ==
Three amateur thieves plot to kidnap the young son of wealthy Chettiar (Tamil) / Kishore Mehta (Hindi) from school. They do a trial run. However, on the eve of the kidnapping, Raju, whose job it is to operate a crane in this plan, is hospitalised. The services of Avinasi (Tamil) / Avinash (Hindi), a.k.a. Mumbai Xpress, a deaf but docile stuntman who performs daredevil bike acts, is hired. Twists and turns take place where the other two gang members are hurt, and invariably, the Mumbai Xpress is left to perform the task all by himself. He kidnaps the wrong boy, Daddu, the illegitimate son of Ahalya and police officer Rao, but manages to get a huge ransom from Chettiar / Mehta by default. A brawl takes place between the original kidnap planners – Chidambaram (Tamil) / Digambar (Hindi), Johnson, and Avinasi / Avinash – in handling Ahalya's child, but Avinasi / Avinash delivers the child unhurt to his mother. He eavesdrops into her tele-con with Rao, where Rao wants to settle both the ransom and sever his ties with her. Ahalya pleads and coaxes him to help her get the ransom, which Rao is willing to pay. The child takes a fancy to Avinasi / Avinash and wants him to be the man in their life, and gets him to agree (or else he would throw himself from a multi-story building). Ahalya wants either Rao's or Chettiar / Mehta's money, which Avinasi / Avinash is holding, whereas Avinasi / Avinash is in love and wants to be that protective person. Rao appoints Chettiar / Mehta to handle the ransom, and what follows is a series of humorous mix-ups. In the end, all settle their differences and become the board of directors of Avinasi / Avinash's Mumbai Express, a mega-bar owned by Avinasi / Avinash and Ahalya, now married, to a happy ending.

== Cast ==
- Kamal Haasan as Avinasi / Avinash (Mumbai Xpress / "C")
- Manisha Koirala as Ahalya
- Nassar as ACP Sri Puniapragya Rao (Tamil)
- Om Puri as ACP Sri Puniapragya Rao (Hindi)
- Santhana Bharathi as Chettiar
- Saurabh Shukla as Kishore Mehta
- Ramesh Aravind as Insurance agent Thambhu
- Pasupathy as Chidambaram "A" (Tamil)
- Vijay Raaz as Digambar "A" (Hindi)
- Sharat Saxena as Inspector Saxena
- Kovai Sarala as Durga (Tamil)
- Pratima Kazmi as Durga (Hindi)
- Vaiyapuri as Johnson "B" (Tamil)
- Dinesh Lamba as Johnson "B" (Hindi)
- Dheena as Raju
- Raza Murad as Rao's relative
- Shama Deshpande as Kishore's wife
- Hardik Thakar as Hardhik Rao (Daddu)

== Production ==
In May 2004, actor Kamal Haasan and director Singeetham Srinivasa Rao were revealed to be developing a Hindi-Tamil bilingual film tentatively titled Kumar Sambhavam with Madhuri Dixit as the lead actress. Haasan stated he needed a "woman of substance who would look convincing as a wife and mother" and stated there was "no second choice" for the role. Bharat Shah was set to finance the project and negotiated terms with Dixit to work on the project, having earlier worked with her during the making of Devdas (2002). The film was eventually dropped.

On 8 November 2004, Haasan and Rao's next film, titled Mumbai Xpress, was officially announced. Haasan revealed that the film would be made in Tamil and Hindi, with the former version also featuring Nassar, Pasupathy and Vaiyapuri while the latter would include Mahesh Manjrekar, Om Puri and Saurabh Shukla in its cast. Vijay Raaz eventually replaced Manjrekar, while a ten-year-old boy, Hardhik Thakar, was added to the cast. Haasan then decided to fund the film and Crazy Mohan was approached to write the dialogues, though the writer later pulled out of the venture as he went for a tour to United States.

The team faced problems casting the lead actress, with attempts to cast Bipasha Basu, Tabu and Kajol unsuccessful. Finally in mid-November 2004, the team agreed terms with Manisha Koirala and the actress flew to Chennai to take part in a photoshoot. During production the film faced criticism for having an English title, but Haasan remained unperturbed and refused to change the title. During the filming of a motorbike stunt sequence, Haasan suffered an injury which resulted in severe bruising, while Thakar his co-passenger on the motorbike escaped injury.

== Soundtrack ==
Mumbai Xpress

Soundtrack album by Ilaiyaraaja
- Released: 7 March 2005
- Genre: Feature film soundtrack
- Length: 37:19 (Hindi)
- Languages: Tamil; Hindi
- Labels: Raajkamal Audios (Tamil); Ayngaran Music (Tamil); An Ak Audio (Tamil); Venus (Hindi)
External audio
- Official Hindi Audio Jukebox on YouTube

The soundtrack was composed by Ilaiyaraaja, the Tamil lyrics were written by Vaali, and the Hindi lyrics were written by Dev Kohli. Kamal Haasan launched an audio company called Rajkamal Audios, just to release the film's music and held a special opening event at Prasad Labs.

Tamil track listing
No.	Title	Lyrics	Singer(s)	Length
1.	"Yelae Nee Yetipoo"	Vaali	Kamal Haasan, Sunidhi Chauhan, Sonu Nigam, Shreya Ghoshal, Shaan	7:38
2.	"Poo Poothadu"	Vaali	Sonu Nigam, Shreya Ghoshal, Shaan	6:34
3.	"Kurangu Kaiyil Maalai"	Vaali	Kamal Haasan, Tippu	5:40
4.	"Vandemataram"	Bankim Chandra Chatterjee	Chorus	1:43
5.	"Well Of Death" (Instrumental)			3:24
6.	"Theme Music" (Instrumental)			5:05
Total length:				30:04

Hindi track listing
No.	Title	Lyrics	Singer(s)	Length
1.	"Pyaar Chahiye"	Dev Kohli	Sonu Nigam, Shaan, Shreya Ghoshal
2.	"Pyaar Chahiye (2)"	Dev Kohli	Sonu Nigam, Shaan
3.	"Aila Re"	Dev Kohli	Sonu Nigam, K. K., Shaan, Sunidhi Chauhan, Shreya Ghoshal & Chorus
4.	"Bander Ki Dug Dugi"	Dev Kohli	Sonu Nigam, K. K., Shaan, Sunidhi Chauhan
5.	"Monkey Chatter" (Instrumental)

Telugu track listing
No.	Title	Singer(s)	Length
1.	"Idemi Vinta Gola"	S.P. Balasubramaniam, Kamal Hassan, Parthasarathy
2.	"Lera Addu"	S.P. Balasubramaniam, Gopika Poornima, S.P. Sailaja
3.	"Na Kanulalo"	S.P. Balasubramaniam, K. S. Chitra
4.	"Vandemataram"	Chorus

== Release ==
The Tamil version of Mumbai Xpress was released on 14 April 2005, clashing with Chandramukhi and Sachein. The Hindi version released the day after.

== Reception ==
=== Critical response ===
Baradwaj Rangan praised the film calling it "one of Kamal Haasan's most tight-knit, most convoluted screenplays, where every pratfall, every pun, every preposterous moment seems to have been spat on, polished, and precisely positioned into an overall jigsaw pattern". He added that "Mumbai Xpress isn't exactly an all-out comedy. Like Pushpak, it's the blues with belly laughs, a stack of serious issues coated with smiles." Malathi Rangarajan of The Hindu wrote, "Rajkamal Films International's Mumbai Xpress is a clean, comic package for the entire family, which showcases Kamal's versatility in story and dialogue writing too". Nikhat Kazmi of The Times of India reviewing the Hindi version gave the film 2.5 stars out of 5, writing "Other than that occasional laugh, there isn't much to lift your spirits or tickle your ribs." Pankaj Shukla of SmasHits reviewing the Hindi version wrote, "Technically, Mumbai Xpress is a brilliant film except for its music. [Ilaiyaraaja] is yet to know what the entertainer from Bollywood requires".

Sneha May Francis of Rediff.com gave the Hindi version a mixed review, writing "To sum it up, Mumbai Xpress is a poor man's superhero movie and an out-and-out children's flick. If you are the kind looking for intelligent humour, this one is not for you. After taking you through such a long ride, the movie ends abruptly, leaving you thinking that the joke was on you for watching the film!", while Siddhu Warrier of the same website, gave the Tamil version a positive review, wrote "The dialogues are the highlight of the movie -- almost every line elicits a guffaw. The jokes, bucking today's trend, are not ribald and risqué, but of the kind that would get even the average 10 year old kicking the back of the seat in front of him in joy (of course, much to my dismay)." Visual Dasan of Kalki reviewing the Tamil version called it a modern comedy express to celebrate summer with family.

=== Box office ===
Box Office India certified the film as a "flop" as it netted only ₹3.50 crore (US$370,000) from the North Indian region. According to Srivatsan of The Hindu, the film may have failed because of over-expectations from audiences, given Haasan and Srinivasa Rao's famed partnership, and since the cinematography had been done with a digital camera it might have made the visuals look a "little off-putting".
