= Kagojer Nouka =

- Directed by: Parthasarathi Joarder
- Written by: Ashok Basu
- Screenplay by: Ashok Basu
- Starring: Victor Banerjee; Soumitra Chatterjee; Bidita Bag; Rajesh Sharma
- Cinematography: Siddhartha Dey
- Edited by: M. Sushmit
- Production company: Olivia Creation
- Release date: 13 May 2013
- Running time: 122 minutes
- Language: Bengali

Kagojer Nouka is a Bengali language socio-political drama film directed by Parthasarathi Joarder and produced by Olivia Creation. This film was released on 13 May 2013. Nandan (Kolkata) theatre refused to screen this film. The film revolved around a chit fund scam. Director Joardar told the media that they sent the film to Nandan authority for preview, but he thought they did not even see the film before refusing it.

== Plot ==
An officer of National Investigation Agency, Arvind Singh, investigates the chit funds scams of West Bengal. People are being misguided by these fraudulent schemes. This huge amount of money from the common people is used to finance films. Mr. Raman is a freedom fighter who goes all out to get rid of this menace in the society. His son, Bhuvan, and his wife also get murdered. Finally, Mr. Sujoy Sen Sharma, another freedom fighter is the real kingpin who is running this chit fund business to help terrorists by supplying them with arms to run terrorism in the state.

== Cast ==
- Victor Banerjee as Raman
- Soumitra Chatterjee as Mr. Sujoy Sen Sharma
- Bidita Bag
- Rajesh Sharma as Arvind Singh
- Anusuya Majumdar
- Priyam
- Piyali Munshi

== Songs ==
1. "Khujechhi Toke Shudhu" - Nilanjana Sarkar
2. "Andhokare Poth Je Haray"
3. "Ei Nesha" - Priyo Chatterjee - Kalpana Patowari
4. "Andhokare Poth j Harai" - Sanchayita - Javed Ali
5. "Rupia Chara Ki Rupashi Potere" - Priyo Chatterjee - Kalpona Patwari
