= Jorugaa Husharugaa =

- Theatrical release poster
- Directed by: Anu Prasad
- Produced by: Nireesh Thiruveedula
- Starring: Viraj Ashwin; Pujita Ponnada
- Cinematography: Mahi Reddy Pandugula
- Edited by: Marthand K. Venkatesh
- Music by: Praneeth Muzic
- Production companies: Shikhara & Akshara Arts LLP
- Release date: 15 December 2023
- Country: India
- Language: Telugu

Jorugaa Husharugaa (transl. Loud and smart) is a 2023 Indian Telugu-language romantic drama film directed by Anu Prasad and starring Viraj Ashwin and Pujita Ponnada. The film was released to average reviews.

== Cast ==
- Viraj Ashwin as Santhosh
- Pujita Ponnada as Nitya
- Sonu Thakur
- Siri Hanumanthu
- Madhunandan as Anand
- P. Sai Kumar as Santhosh's father
- Rohini as Santhosh's mother
- Brahmaji as Church father

== Reception ==
Bhargav Chaganti of NTV Telugu gave the film two-and-a-half out of five stars. A critic from Eenadu found the storyline lacking novelty, with a draggy first half, while the second half was engaging. A critic from Sakshi rated the film two-and-a-half out of five stars, suggesting that a better-written script could have made the film more engaging.

Sunil Boddula of News18 Telugu gave it two-and-a-half out of five stars, raising criticism similar to the Eenadu critic's regarding the film's screenplay. A critic from ABP Desam also gave it two-and-a-half out of five stars, criticizing the story for lacking freshness.
