= Lakeerein =

- Theatrical release poster
- Directed by: Durgesh Pathak
- Screenplay by: Dilip Shukla
- Story by: Durgesh Pathak; Surya Saxena
- Produced by: Naval K Tandon; Kavita Pathak; Dinesh Kumar
- Starring: Ashutosh Rana; Bidita Bag; Gaurav Chopra; Tia Bajpai; Rajesh jais
- Cinematography: Naren A Gedia
- Edited by: Harkirat Singh Lal; Sunder Pathuri; Parag
- Production companies: Image & Creation; BTC Multimedia; Blackpearl Movies
- Distributed by: Reliance Entertainment
- Release date: 3 November 2023
- Country: India
- Language: Hindi

Lakeerein is a 2023 Indian Hindi-language legal drama film directed by Durgesh Pathak. It stars Ashutosh Rana, Bidita Bag, Gaurav Chopra and Tia Bajpai. It addresses the complex and often underreported issue of marital rape within the confines of marriage. It is produced by Image & Creation, BTC Multimedia, and Blackpearl Movies and distributed by the Reliance Entertainment. It explores the legal, societal, and emotional challenges its victims face. The film was released on 3 November 2023.

== Synopsis ==
Lakeerein tells the powerful story of Kavya, played by Tia Bajpai, who seeks justice against her husband, Professor Vivek Agnihotri, portrayed by Gaurav Chopra, for marital rape, a deeply troubling issue often overlooked due to societal misconceptions about consent in marriage. The film, set in Lucknow and Ayodhya, delves into Kavya's emotional journey and its impact on those around her, like her friend Anita and maid Naseema, who've also suffered similarly. Advocate Geeta Bishwas, played by Bidita Bag, challenges the legal differentiation between married and unmarried women when recognizing rape, sparking a vital conversation about societal values and justice.

== Cast ==
- Ashutosh Rana as Dudhari Singh
- Bidita Bag as Geeta Biswas
- Gaurav Chopra as Professor Vivek Damodar Agnihotri
- Tia Bajpai as Kavya Agnihotri
- Rajesh Jais as Purushottam Bharti
- Saharsh Shukla as Adv. Sagar Srivastava
- Aman Verma as Ravi Verma
- Mukesh Bhatt as Rambabu
- Anil Rastogi as Padam Singh
- Aditi Dixit as Naseema
- Kasim as Ali Mohd.
- Meenakshi Arya as Anita
- Purnima Tiwari as Neelu
- Rehan Kedwai as Altaf Bhai, Geeta's driver
- Samreen Siddiqui as anchor
- Aayushi Sharma as field reporter

== Production ==
The film is directed by Durgesh Pathak and Produced by Kavita Pathak, Naval Kishore Tandon, Dinesh Kumar, co-produced by Swarnika Pandey, Naren A Gedia, Aabha Tandon, Varun Mishra, Soni Mishra, and Pawan Gaur. The film has been shot at various locations of Lucknow, Ayodhya and other cities.
