= Crash Course (TV series) =

2022 Indian television series

- Genre: Drama
- Written by: Manish Hariprasad; Raina Roy
- Directed by: Vijay Maurya
- Starring: Annu Kapoor; Bidita Bag; Bhanu Uday; Chirag Vohra; Hetal Gada; Riddhi Kumar; Siddharth Kak
- Music by: Av Prafullachandra
- Country of origin: India
- Original language: Hindi
- No. of seasons: 1
- No. of episodes: 10

Production
- Producer: Manish Hariprasad
- Cinematography: Nagaraj Rathinam
- Editor: Chandrashekhar Prajapati
- Running time: 42-47 minutes
- Production company: Owlet Films

Original release
- Network: Amazon Prime Video
- Release: 5 August 2022

Crash Course is an Indian Hindi-language drama television series written by showrunner–producer Manish Hariprasad and Raina Roy, directed by Vijay Maurya and produced by Owlet Films. Starring Annu Kapoor, Udit Arora, Anvesha Vij, Anushka Kaushik, Bhanu Uday, Hetal Gada, Hridhu Haroon, Pranay Pachauri and others, the series was released on Amazon Prime Video on 5 August 2022.

== Plot ==
The series follows a group of students who, in the midst of preparations for competitive exams to fulfil their parent's expectations, are affected when two rival coaching institutes of Kota (Rajasthan) – the Ratanraj Jindal and Arvind Batra-led centres engage in a power struggle. It is a blend of ambitions, teen life, student pressure, academics, business, friendship, etc.

== Cast ==
- Annu Kapoor as Ratanraj Jindal
- Siddharth Kak as Arvind Batra
- Bhanu Uday as Shashank Batra
- Chirag Vohra as Mayank Batra
- Bidita Bag as Antara Jaiswal
- Hetal Gada as Tejal Patel
- Riddhi Kumar as Shanaya Qazi
- Deepak Dutta as Home Minister
- Udit Arora as Binny Agarwal
- Pranay Pachauri as Ashutosh Kumar/AK
- Anushka Kaushik as Vidhi Gupta
- Hridhu Haroon as Sathya Srinivasan
- Mohit Solanki as Anil Baid
- Bhavesh Balchandani as Aviral Bharti
- Aryan Singh as Rakesh Gulia
- Anvesha Vij as Nikki Kapoor
- Gaurav Sharma as Dheeraj Khandelwal/KD
- Devas Dixit as Mahender

== Episodes ==
No.	Title	Directed by	Written by	Original release date
1	"Faces on a Billboard"	Vijay Maurya	Manish Hariprasad, Raina Roy	5 August 2022
2	"Wheeler-Dealer"	Vijay Maurya	Manish Hariprasad, Raina Roy	5 August 2022
3	"Covalent Bonding"	Vijay Maurya	Manish Hariprasad, Raina Roy	5 August 2022
4	"The A,B,C,D Game"	Vijay Maurya	Manish Hariprasad, Raina Roy	5 August 2022
5	"Bell Curve"	Vijay Maurya	Manish Hariprasad, Raina Roy	5 August 2022
6	"The Loyalty Tests"	Vijay Maurya	Manish Hariprasad, Raina Roy	5 August 2022
7	"Brothers in Arms"	Vijay Maurya	Manish Hariprasad, Raina Roy	5 August 2022
8	"Red Handed"	Vijay Maurya	Manish Hariprasad, Raina Roy	5 August 2022
9	"Free Falling"	Vijay Maurya	Manish Hariprasad, Raina Roy	5 August 2022
10	"The End. The Beginning"	Vijay Maurya	Manish Hariprasad, Raina Roy	5 August 2022

== Release ==
Crash Course was released on Amazon Prime Video in India and worldwide on 5 August 2022.

== Reception ==
Most of the critics found Crash Course as a spin-off version of Netflix series Kota Factory. Archika Khurana for The Times of India rate 3/5 stars and wrote "'Crash Course' has nothing new to offer in terms of insights. One thing that remains constant throughout the show, if not more, is that you will miss Kota Factory's Jeetu Bhaiya and his words of wisdom..."

Prateek Sur for Outlook rated 2.5/5 stars and wrote "'Crash Course’ is a hard-hitting and realistic view of today's education system. Its heart is in the right place, however, it's the sloppy writing that kills the fun."

Ruchi Kaushal for Hindustan Times wrote "Crash Course stands far from Kota Factory in realism but does take credit for addressing student suicides, parental pressure, the distractions they face away from home, love angles, teenage pregnancy and even drugs." Deepa Gehlot for Scroll.in wrote "There was nothing new to add to the narrative of avaricious coaching classes, pushy parents and vulnerable students. Thus the Amazon Prime Video series Crash Course, directed by actor-writer Vijay Maurya from a script by Manish Hariprasad and Raina Roy, treads familiar ground."

Pratikshya Mishra for The Quint wrote "Unlike Kota Factory, the show is more gripping when it’s focusing on the business and the politics of education, especially living through Udit Arora as Binny, the ‘real kingpin’ of Kota".

Namrata Thakker for Rediff.com wrote "The series has 10 episodes with a runtime of 50-odd minutes per episode, and that's too much. The makers could have squeezed the story in seven or eight episodes, making it crisper."

The Pinkvilla focused some light on the series to Netflix series Kota Factory and wrote "All in all, Crash Course is a distant relative of Kota Factory, which builds some tension in the first episode but lacks the novelty due to an already iconic series in the same space."
