= Hetal Gada =

Indian actress

- Born: 19 January 2003 (age 23); New Delhi, India
- Occupation: Actress
- Years active: 2014–present

Hetal Gada is an Indian film and television child actress. She is known for portraying the lead role of Pari in the hit film Dhanak and Arya Mathur in the serial Aap Ke Aa Jane Se, that airs on Zee TV.

== Career ==
In 2014, Gada guest-starred in an episode of Savdhaan India. In 2015, she was cast as the lead in two films, Dhanak as Pari, and Ishani in Chidiya. In the same year, she was cast in Zee TV's series Jamai Raja, Color TV's Code Red and another episode of Savdhaan India. In 2017, she was cast in a third film, Daak Ghar as a character named Sudha. In late 2017, she bagged a recurring role in the soap opera Aap Ke Aa Jane Se as Arya Mathur. She also played a major role as Tejal Patel in the prime web series Crash Course released in 2022.

== Personal life ==
Gada was born to a casting director Krupa Pandya.

== Filmography ==
Film
Year	Title	Role	Notes
2016	Dhanak	Pari	Lead role
2016	Chidiya	Ishani	Lead role
2017	Daak Ghar	Sudha	Lead role

Television
Year	Title	Role	Channel	Notes
2010	Pyaar Kii Ye Ek Kahaani	Piyali Jaiswal (younger)	STAR One	Recurring role
2014	Savdhaan India	Methali (Episode 822)	Life OK	Episodic role
2015	Savdhaan India		Life OK	Episodic role
2015	Code Red		Colors TV	Episodic role
2015	Crime Patrol	Neha Sharma	Sony Entertainment Television	Episodic role
2016	Jamai Raja		Zee TV	Recurring role
2016	Crime Patrol Dial 100	Ayesha	Sony Entertainment Television	Episodic Role
2017	Thapki Pyar Ki	Kesar	Colors TV	Recurring role
2017	Crime Patrol Dial 100	Jaanvi	Sony Entertainment Television	Episodic Role
2018–19	Aap Ke Aa Jane Se	Arya Mathur/ Shrivastav/ Agarwal	Zee TV	Recurring role
2022	Yeh Kaali Kaali Ankhein		Netflix	
2022	Crash Course	Tejal Patel	Amazon Prime Video	
2023-2024	Yeh Meri Family (Season 2 & 3)	Ritika	Amazon Mini TV	

== Awards and nominations ==
Year	Award	Category	Work	Result
2016	Screen Awards	Screen Award for Best Child Artist	Dhanak	Nominated
2017	Zee Cine Awards	Zee Cine Award for Best Female Debut	Dhanak	Nominated
