= 88 Antop Hill =

- Directed by: Kushan Nandy
- Written by: Kushan Nandy; Kiran Shroff
- Produced by: Kiran Shroff
- Starring: Rahul Dev; Atul Kulkarni; Shweta Menon; Jasmine D'Souza
- Cinematography: Hari Nair
- Music by: Rajesh Roy
- Release date: 27 June 2003
- Running time: 119 minutes
- Country: India
- Language: Hindi

88 Antop Hill is a 2003 Indian Hindi-language mystery thriller film written and directed by Kushan Nandy, with dialogues by Ashish Deo. The film is a murder mystery and is loosely based on James Hadley Chase's 1954 novel Tiger by The Tail and was released on 27 June 2003.

== Plot ==
The film opens with the brutal murder of Neeraj Shah. His body is dumped in the trunk of a car. Elsewhere, bank employee Pratyush Shelar gets home late on his anniversary because he was consoling an old college classmate and crush about her marital woes, which does not go over well with his wife Antara, furthering their own marital woes and leading to her leaving home with their daughter. Pratyush's colleague, Aslam Durrani, suggests he visit an exotic dancer, Teesta. Pratyush is not interested. However, that night, Aslam calls Pratyush in a panic, stating that some thugs are about to kill him and asking Pratyush to come immediately to 88 Antop Hill. Pratyush arrives, only to find out that Aslam was putting on an act to get him to see Teesta. Pratyush is frustrated but, curious to know what exactly Teesta knows about him, goes to a club with her, where she points out a few folks she knows. Having learned nothing significant, he drives her home and asks for the keys to his car; she tells him to come upstairs and get them from her place. While she is waiting for Teesta to get the keys, Teesta is mysteriously murdered. Scared and confused, Pratyush leaves immediately, but is seen by a neighbor and the watchman. Inspector Arvind Khanvilkar is assigned the case, and while investigating, the cops become suspicious for Pratyush. Desperate to prove his innocence, Pratyush tries to investigate and comes across a few more suspicious characters and, eventually, another murder. He contacts cops, but a dimwitted cop doesn't hear him out and instead sternly asks him to surrender, as the police have found the murder weapon and his blood-stained shirt. At wits end, Pratyush decides to go visit Teesta's friend, who is also the sister of the other murder victim; Inspector Khanvilkar also ends up here, and the truths of the multiple murders are revealed.

== Cast ==
- Rahul Dev as Inspector Arvind Khanvilkar
- Atul Kulkarni as Pratyush Shelar
- Shweta Menon as Teesta
- Subrat Dutta as Prashant
- Jasmine D'Souza as Sonali
- Suchitra Pillai as Antara
- Harsh Khurana as Aslam Durrani
- Shauket Baig as Murli Mansukhani
- Sachin Dubey as Neeraj
- Sharad Ponkshe as Police officer
- Sanjay Singh as K. K. Memon

== Reception ==
Taran Adarsh of IndiaFM gave the film 1 out of 5, ″On the whole, 88 ANTOP HILL is high on technique, but low on substance.″ Deepa Gumaste of Rediff.com wrote ″ilms like 88 Antop Hill don't exactly need a saving grace -- they are better off not being made at all. But if there is something worth a mention, it is a couple of scary moments and solid performances from Atul Kulkarni and Rahul Dev. Both actors rise above the frailties of the film (and the rest of the cast), but their heroic efforts aren't enough to salvage the situation.″
