= Hum Dum =

- Theatrical release poster
- Directed by: Kushan Nandy
- Written by: Ghalib Asad Bhopali
- Screenplay by: Kiran Shroff
- Story by: Kiran Shroff
- Produced by: Kushan Nandy; Kiran Shroff
- Starring: Romit Raj; Anjana
- Cinematography: Ashok Behl
- Edited by: Ashmith Kunder
- Music by: Sujeet–Rajesh
- Production company: Sarvodaya Visuals
- Release date: 11 February 2005
- Country: India
- Language: Hindi

Hum Dum is a 2005 Bollywood romantic-drama film directed by Kushan Nandy and produced by Kushan Nandy and Kiran Shroff under the banner of Sarvodaya Visuals. It features actors Romit Raj and Anjana in the lead roles. Sujeet–Rajesh scored the music for the film.

== Cast ==
- Anjana as Rutu Joshi
- Romit Raj as Siddhant Dey
- Tanvi Azmi
- Benjamin Gilani
- Ranvir Shorey
- Shammi
- Prithvi Zutshi
- Jaidev Hattangadi
- Om Katare

== Music ==
Hum Dum

Soundtrack album by Sujeet–Rajesh
- Released: 2005
- Genre: Feature film soundtrack
- Length: 34:10
- Label: Das Music

The soundtrack of the film was composed by Sujeet–Rajesh. Lyrics were written by Surendra Mishra and Shaheen Iqbal.

All lyrics are written by Surendra Mishra, Shaheen Iqbal; all music is composed by Sujeet–Rajesh.

Hum Dum (Original Motion Picture Soundtrack)
No.	Title	Artist(s)	Length
1.	"Humdum"	Shreya Ghoshal, Sonu Nigam	4:51
2.	"Tanhaiya" (Female Version)	Shreya Ghoshal	5:34
3.	"Lahaul Vila"	Sunidhi Chauhan, Shaan	4:57
4.	"Ab Hum Hain"	Sujeet Shetty	1:51
5.	"Sitaron Pe"	Shaan	5:49
6.	"Hanste Raho"	Madhushree, Abhijeet Bhattacharya	5:32
7.	"Tanhaiya" (Male Version)	Sonu Nigam	5:36
Total length:			34:10
