= Bidita Bag =

Indian film actress and model

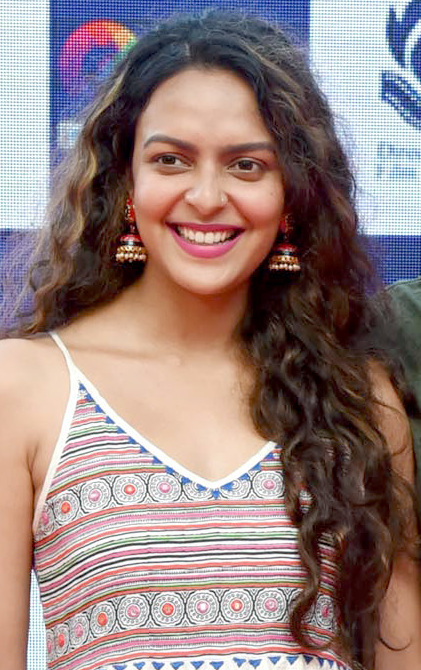
- Bidita Bag in 2019
- Born: Santragachhi, Howrah, West Bengal, India
- Education: Jadavpur University (Economics)
- Occupations: Actor; Model
- Years active: 2010–present

Bidita Bag is an Indian actress and model. She is mostly known for her inclination towards socio-political films.

== Career ==
Bidita pursued a career in modelling in college. She was spotted by Jeena Mitra Banik and ace make-up artist Late Prabeer Kumar Dey. She came to prominence in Kolkata after working for designers like Sabyasachi Mukherjee. After graduation she moved to Mumbai. She has worked for Lakme Fashion Week, Lakmé, Elle-18, Vaseline, Nokia, Motorola, Colgate, Reliance, Fair and Lovely (make-up man ki beti), 7UP, Samsung Corby TV, Wild Stone deodorant, Kwality Walls Cornetto, Manubhai Jewellers, Jade, Bombay Dyeing, Eye-tex Dazzler etc.. Bidita made her film debut with a Bengali film Mukti, followed by Icche, which was released in July 2011.

== Filmography ==
=== Films ===
Year	Film	Role(s)	Language	Notes
2011	Nirbaan	Haasi	Bengali	Debut Film
2011	Icche	Jayanti Laha	Bengali	
2012	From Sydney with Love	Megha Banerjee	Hindi	
2012	Ekhon Nedekha Nodir Xhipare	Sudakshina	Assamese	Simultaneously made in Hindi as As The River Flows
2013	Kagojer Nouka	Nusrat	Bengali	
2015	Bhaunri	Janha	Odia	
2015	X: Past Is Present	Heena	Hindi	Story – "Audition"
2016	Sangabora		Bengali	
2016	Once Again	Meera	Hindi /English	Netflix film
2016	T for Taj Mahal	Chuniya	Hindi	
2017	Babumoshai Bandookbaaz	Phulva	Hindi	
2019	Bouma	Bouma	Bengali	Short film
2019	Moksh to Maya	Maya	Hindi	
2019	The Sholay Girl	Reshma Pathan	Hindi	ZEE5 film
2020	Mera Fauji Calling	Sakshi Singh	Hindi	
2022	Plan A Plan B	Runjhun Chougule	Hindi	Netflix film
2023	Lakeerein	Geeta Biswas	Hindi	

=== Web series ===
Year	Web Series	Role	Notes
2020	Bhaukaal	Nazneen	MX Player
2020	The Missing Stone	Dhwani	MX Player
2020	Abhay	Saloni	Zee5
2021	Ray	Debashree Roy	Netflix
2021	Teen Do Paanch	Priyanka sahu	Disney Hotstar
2022	Crash Course	Antara Jaiswal	Prime Video
2023–Present	Inspector Avinash	Amrita	JioCinema
