= Thank You Brother =

2021 film directed by Ramesh Raparthi

- Release poster
- Directed by: Ramesh Raparthi
- Produced by: Magunta Sarath Chandra Reddy; Tharaknath Bommi Reddy
- Starring: Anasuya Bharadwaj; Viraj Ashwin
- Cinematography: Suresh Ragutu
- Edited by: Nav cuts
- Music by: Guna Balasubramanian
- Production company: Just Ordinary Entertainment
- Distributed by: Aha
- Release date: 7 May 2021
- Running time: 94 minutes
- Country: India
- Language: Telugu

Thank You Brother is a 2021 Indian Telugu-language thriller film written and directed by Ramesh Raparthi. Produced by Magunta Sarath Chandra Reddy and Tharaknath Bommi Reddy, the film stars Anasuya Bharadwaj and Viraj Ashwin in primary roles. The film premiered on Aha on 7 May 2021. Music of the film was composed by Guna Balasubramanian. The film is an official remake of the 2019 Nigerian film Elevator Baby.

== Plot ==
The narrative unfolds with the lives of two distinct individuals, Priya and Abhi, who become entangled by the threads of fate and circumstance. Priya, a resilient pregnant widow, navigates the challenges of loss following her husband Surya's tragic demise in a factory accident. Meanwhile, Abhi, a young man engrossed in a reckless lifestyle, faces the consequences of his irresponsible actions when his mother cuts off his finances due to his extravagant and careless behaviour.

Abhi's pursuit of employment in the midst of the COVID-19 pandemic adds a layer of difficulty to his character, showcasing the harsh realities of unemployment. The narrative takes an unexpected turn when Priya and Abhi, seemingly worlds apart, are trapped in a malfunctioning elevator that crashes down to the basement.

Isolated from the outside world, Abhi's attempts to seek help from his friends are met with rejection due to their prior argument. The news of their predicament spreads throughout the apartment complex, prompting the community to unite in a collaborative effort to rescue Priya and Abhi. As tensions rise, Priya goes into labour, intensifying the urgency of escape from their situation.

In a surprising twist, Abhi's estranged father, Dr. Prem, a respected gynaecologist in the community, steps in to assist in the birth. The shared experience of impending parenthood and the struggle for survival forge an unexpected bond between Priya and Abhi. A pivotal moment occurs when an electrician, a crucial figure in the unfolding drama, manages to repair the elevator.

In the aftermath of this harrowing ordeal, Priya gives birth to a baby girl, symbolising hope and new beginnings. The community witnesses Abhi's transformation during this life-altering experience, accepting him as a changed man.

== Cast ==
- Anasuya Bharadwaj as Priya
- Viraj Ashwin as Abhi
- Mounika Reddy as Sameera
- Anish Kuruvilla as Dr. Prem
- Harsha Chemudu as Chiku
- Annapoorna
- Archana Ananth as Bhanu
- Aadarsh Balakrishna as Surya
- Kadambari Kiran
- Viva Raghav
- Sajiv Pasala

== Production ==
Viraj Ashwin and debutant Mounika Reddy were cast for main roles in the film. Filming was done in late 2020. A promotional poster was released in November 2020, revealing the title of the film.

== Soundtrack ==
The lyrical version of the first single "The Soul of Thank You Brother" was released on 28 April 2021 on Aditya Music label.

All music is composed by Guna Balasubramanian.

Telugu (OST)
No.	Title	Lyrics	Singer(s)	Length
1.	"The Soul of Thank You Brother"	Lakshmi Priyanka	Shakthi Shree Gopalan, Guna Balasubramanian	3:51

== Marketing and release ==
The film was originally scheduled for a theatrical release on 30 April 2021. Due to the COVID-19 pandemic, the film was scheduled to release on Aha on 7 May 2021.

== Reception ==
The film received mixed reviews from critics. Sravan Vanaparthy of The Times of India wrote that "there are more misses than hits and as a viewer, you're left yearning for more." Another critic of Cinema Express quoted "Thank You Brother is a better drama than a thriller." A reviewer of India Today rated the film 2 out of 5 and stated that the film is yet another OTT film that is cliched and predictable and also said that the film's story does not offer anything new.

The Hindu's Sangeetha Devi Dundoo wrote, "Despite the predictability of how things will unravel, I kept watching in the hope that Priya is safe and Abhi rises to the occasion and helps her," and compared the film with the 2019 Nigerian film Elevator Baby.
