= Ashish Deo =

Indian film director and screenwriter

- Born: Mumbai, India
- Occupations: Film director; screenwriter
- Years active: 2004–present

Ashish Deo is an Indian script writer and film director. He started his career with the television serial Chhoti si yeh duniya under the corporation of Vishesh Films. He has written and directed documentaries and films. His theatre plays in Marathi have performed hundreds of shows and have been translated into Hindi and Gujrathi. He has also directed an English play.

His works has been used by film critics, directors like Ramesh Sippy, Ravi Rai and had appeared or used by television screen producers including; Cinevistaas, Kushan Nandy Creations, Mad Films, UTV and more. His television serials includes; Do Lafzon ki Kahani & Chacha Chowdhary for Sahara One, Saturday Suspense and Suspense Hour & Thriller at Ten for Zee TV, Kya Baat hai? for Star Plus, while others includes Crime Patrol, Sony TV, etc.

Deo started his film writing career debuting his first written movie, 88 Antop Hill, a critically acclaimed suspense thriller. He had also won awards including the best film award for Vasudeo Balwant Phadke.

== Filmography ==
A. Experience : Feature Films.. released

1. Feature Film : [JETA] (Marathi) (Additional Dialogues) Producer : [Ramesh Deo Productions] Released on 6 August 2010

2. Feature Film : [Vasudeo Balvant Phadke] (Marathi) Producer : [Ramesh Deo Productions] Released on 7 Dec 7

3. Feature Film : [Darnaa Zaruri Hai..] (Released on 28 Apr 6) Produced by : [Ram Gopal Varma].

4. Feature Film : [Vishvas] (Marathi) (Directed By : [Girish Mohite]) Produced by : Oracle entertainment Pvt. Ltd.(released on 24 Mar 6)

5. Feature Film : [88 Antop Hill] Produced by : Sarvodaya Visuals(Released on 27 June 2003)

B. Experience : TV Serials..

1. Name : [Crime Patrol] ( Episodic real stories of crime) Produced by : Cine Vista (Released on Sony TV 2004–2006)

2. Name : [Chhoti si yeh duniya] ( Emotional & Comedy ) Produced by : [Mr.Mukesh Bhatt]

3. Name : [Kya baat Hai?] (Slapstick Comedy) Produced by : [Mr. Ramesh Sippy] (Released on STAR PLUS) 1997–1998

4. Name : [Raajkahaani] (Historical Drama) [DD1] – 1998–99

5. Name : [Mr. Gaayab] (Science Fiction) [ZEE TV] – 19 98–99

6. Name : [Do Lafzo ki Kahani] (Family Drama) [Sahara TV]-June 2001–02

7. Name : [Shree 420] ( Episodic) (Con Cases) Produced by : MAD Entertainment Ltd. Directed by : Anshuman Singh (Released on Zee TV) 2001

8. Name :[Saturday Suspense] & Suspense Hour

9. Name :Thriller at 10 ([ZEE TV])

10. Name : [The Locked Room] ( X zone ) [Zee Tv]. On 26 November 2000

C. Experience : [Tele Film]

1. Name : Chakravyuha (Director's cut) (Suspense Thriller) Directed by : Shahjehan Released on Channel 9 16 December 2000

2. Name : Kisi Mod Par (Slot – Kambakht Ishq) Directed by : Hari Nair Released on Zee TV.. on 25 January 2003

D. Experience : Stage Shows & Events

1. Name : Zintag 98.. (Written and Directed a musical show with play back singers to raise fund for a church) May 1998

2. Name : Superstar Millennium 2001 ( New Year Show 31 December 2000) For[Zee TV] Many film based anchor shows.. for various channels like[zee], [Sahara], [Sony], [EL Tv], [Channel 9], [DD Metro],

3. Name : Bollywood Musical Night, (G.S. Entertainment)(An Entertainment show with playback singers at Dubai on 3 October 2003)

4. Name : Dil Ka Maamla hai.. Designed, Written and Directed An Entertaining Event with.. Magicians.. Musical Orchestra of all the doctors.. and an audio visual show.. "Direct Dil Se" (for a company named B BRAUN, for a conference of Cardiologists from all over India ) 2002 March.

5. Name : ROSY BLUE SHOW.. Written and Directed an Event for Lintas Advertising.. Client Rosy Blue, at Hotel Taj on 28 Dec 6

E. Experience : Marathi Serial

1. Name : Reshim gaathi Released on [ZEE ( Alpha )TV] 23 February 2000

F. Experience : TVC (English, Hindi, Marathi)

1. Ad Agency : Strategic Vision 2. Campaign : Winston Jeans 3. Campaign : Moniba Water Purifier 4. Campaign : Super Gas (Corporate film, van promotional film, )

G. Experience : Documentary / Presentation Films

1. Name : Sangharsh Yatri (Written and Directed a documentary on Mr. Govindrao Adik.) (President- [Maharashtra Pradesh Congress Committee])

2. Name : The Story of success (Written and Directed a presentation film for Yash Holidays)

H. Experience : Marathi Stage

Ø One Act Plays

1. Aayushya Asach Jagaayacha Asata (Over all 27 Awards in state level competitions) I 2. the Maanus Jaaga Aahe (Over all 22 Awards in state level competitions)

3. Ghar Doghancha (Over all 46 Awards in state level competitions)

Ø Two Act Professional Plays

1. Aayushya Asach Jagaayacha Asata (1997 jan) 2. Eka Talyaat Hoti.... (2002 July.) 3. Aamchi Jyeshth Kanya... 2002 aug. (Completed 150 shows successfully)

Ø Hinglish (hind & English) Play.. Writing and Creative Direction.

1. Just Muhobbat.. ( 25 July 2004)
