= Jasmine D'Souza =

Indian actress

Jasmine D'Souza is an Indian Model, Bollywood actress and a film director. She is the winner of the Gladrags Mrs. India 2001 beauty pageant. She is known for her role in 88 Antop Hill.

== Career ==
Jasmine D'Souza started her career as a model endorsing popular brands such as Lakme, Mitsubishi Lancer, Nescafe, Cinthol Soap, Lux Soap, Colgate, Sunsilk, Maggi Soups, World Gold Council, De Beers Diamonds, Shoppers Stop, and others. Jasmine was a television show host for the Food Food channel. She is the director of Hindi movie One Night Stand which was released worldwide release on 6 May 2016.

== Personal life ==
Jasmine D’Souza married a film director Anthony D'Souza in 1998.

== Filmography ==
As director

- One Night Stand (2016)
