= The RajaSaab =

2026 Indian film by Maruthi

- Theatrical release poster
- Directed by: Maruthi
- Written by: Maruthi
- Produced by: T. G. Vishwa Prasad; Krithi Prasad
- Starring: Prabhas; Sanjay Dutt; Nidhhi Agerwal; Malavika Mohanan; Riddhi Kumar; Zarina Wahab; Ammu Abhirami
- Cinematography: Karthik Palani
- Edited by: Kotagiri Venkateswara Rao
- Music by: Thaman S
- Production company: People Media Factory
- Release date: 9 January 2026
- Running time: 183 minutes
- Country: India
- Language: Telugu
- Budget: ₹400–450 crore
- Box office: ₹208.38 crore

The RajaSaab (titled onscreen as Prabhas's The RajaSaab) is a 2026 Indian Telugu-language fantasy horror comedy film written and directed by Maruthi, and produced by People Media Factory. The film stars Prabhas, alongside Sanjay Dutt, Nidhhi Agerwal, Malavika Mohanan (in her Telugu film debut), Riddhi Kumar and Zarina Wahab. In the film, a man searching for his missing grandfather finds himself in a mansion inhabited by a sinister presence.

The project was officially announced in January 2024, though principal photography began earlier in October 2022. The film's music is composed by Thaman S, with cinematography by Karthik Palani and editing by Kotagiri Venkateswara Rao.

The film was theatrically released worldwide on 9 January 2026, coinciding with Sankranti. It opened to generally negative reviews from critics, with criticism directed primarily at the screenplay and runtime. Despite the festive release window, the film became a box office failure.

== Plot ==
Gangamma, an Alzheimer's patient, lives a quiet life under the care of her grandson, RajaSaab. Although she forgets almost everything, she continues to hold on to memories of her husband, Kanakaraju, an exorcist believed to be living in exile.

RajaSaab's search for his grandfather leads him to Hyderabad. During his journey, he encounters numerous obstacles and navigates a complex romantic life. He falls in love with Bessy, a devout nun, while another woman, Bhairavi—the granddaughter of a thief—joins his quest and assists him in the search for Kanakaraju.

Their search eventually leads them to a notorious haunted mansion, where they discover that Kanakaraju is not a victim but the architect of their misfortune. He reveals that he deliberately disappeared and orchestrated a long-term plan to lure RajaSaab to the mansion for his own dark purposes.

RajaSaab, Bessy, and Bhairavi find themselves imprisoned within the estate. Despite their attempts to escape, Kanakaraju's supernatural or psychological control over the mansion proves too strong. In a desperate attempt, they summon Specialist Padmabhushan, an expert in dealing with such threats; however, he is swiftly defeated by Kanakaraju's superior powers.

Pushed to his absolute limit, RajaSaab awakens a hidden, mighty strength. His power becomes so immense that it distorts reality, creating a parallel world. Within this altered dimension, RajaSaab manages to overpower and defeat Kanakaraju.

As the events conclude and the group prepares to move on, a mysterious joker-like figure resembling RajaSaab is seen lurking in the shadows, leaving the ultimate fate of the bloodline uncertain.

== Cast ==
- Prabhas in dual roles as
  - Joker
  - Raju "Rajasaab"
- Sanjay Dutt as Pekamedala Kanakaraju, Raju's grandfather (Voice dubbed by P. Ravi Shankar)
- Nidhhi Agerwal as Bessy
- Malavika Mohanan as Bhairavi
- Riddhi Kumar as Anitha
- Zarina Wahab as Gangadevi "Gangamma", Raju's grandmother and Kanakaraju's wife
  - Ammu Abhirami as young Gangadevi
- Samuthirakani as Gangaraju, Bhairavi’s grandfather
- Boman Irani as Dr. Padmabhushan
- Murali Sharma
- VTV Ganesh as Mangalam Babai
- Prabhas Sreenu as Autodriver Seenu
- Saptagiri as Brother RIP, Bessy’s aide
- Satya as Warden
- Rajitha as Raju’s aunt
- Harsha Chemudu as Kareemulla, Raju’s friend
- Mahesh Achanta as Mahesh, Raju’s assistant
- Rohit Pathak as Bhairaagi
- Nanda Gopal MK as Police SI
- Manisha Kandkur as Bessy’s friend
- Supreeth Reddy as Thief
- Vadlamani Srinivas as Gangadevi’s father
- Sonia Chowdary
- Ronson Vincent as Goon
- Anandhi as lady at carnival (cameo appearance)

== Production ==
=== Development ===
In 2022, director Maruthi narrated a horror comedy script to Prabhas to which he agreed. While Prabhas was already shooting Salaar and Kalki 2898 AD, he decided to shoot for the film simultaneously and Maruthi began pre-production work. The film marks the maiden collaboration between Prabhas and Maruthi, and Maruthi called it a “golden opportunity” to direct a star like Prabhas.

The film was tentatively titled Raja Deluxe, to be produced by DVV Entertainment, however, production was later transferred to People Media Factory. Several titles like Royal and Ambassador were considered, however, the title The Raja Saab was announced in January 2024 on the occasion of Sankranti. It is reported that the film takes place at the backdrop of an old cinema theatre. Prabhas reportedly plays dual roles in the film, as the owner of a theatre and another as a ghost, playing both grandson and grandfather.

Several actresses like Raashii Khanna and Sreeleela were considered for the film, before signing Malavika Mohanan, Nidhhi Agerwal and Riddhi Kumar as the three lead actresses. Nayanthara was also roped in for a special song. Later, Sanjay Dutt and Boman Irani also joined the film for important roles.

=== Filming ===
Principal photography began in October 2022. A special set was erected at the Aluminium Factory near Gachibowli in Hyderabad. The next schedule took place in Kanchipuram. Filming continued at a stretch from a period that began after the completion of Prabhas's previous project, Kalki 2898 AD. This block commenced in late July or mid-August and continued uninterrupted until the end of December, totalling approximately five months. During this period, the technical crew worked 16 to 18 hours per day, often from 6:00 AM to 10:00 or 11:00 PM, for more than 120 days. Actors were scheduled in 8-hour shifts, while the crew maintained extended hours to manage the demands of filming on the set.

The film was shot on what is the largest indoor film set ever constructed in India, spanning 41,256 square feet. This set, designed by art director Rajeevan Nambiar, was erected on property owned by People Media Factory in Aziznagar, Moinabad, near Hyderabad. Over 1,200 workers completed the set in four months, constructing a full-scale haveli (mansion) with multiple rooms, a drawing room, dining area, library, kitchen, and custom-designed spaces to serve the film's horror-comedy narrative. The climax of the film was shot entirely on this set. The post-production phase included nearly 300 days of visual effects work. In October 2025, a song was filmed in Greece. The principal photography was wrapped by November 2025.

== Music ==
The film's soundtrack is composed by Thaman S in his first collaboration with Prabhas and third with Maruthi after Mahanubhavudu and Prati Roju Pandage . The music rights were acquired by T-Series.

The first single, "Rebel Saab", was released on 23 November 2025; the second, "Sahana Sahana", was released 17 December 2025; the third, "Raja Yuvaraje", was released 31 December 2025; and the fourth, "Nache Nache", was released 5 January 2026. The latter is a remake of "Auva Auva Koi Yahan Nache Nache" from Disco Dancer (1982), originally composed and sung by Bappi Lahiri and Usha Uthup.

== Release ==
=== Theatrical ===
The film was released worldwide on 9 January 2026, coinciding with Sankranthi in Telugu alongside dubbed versions of Hindi, Tamil, Kannada and Malayalam languages. Initially, the film was set to release on 10 April 2025 and then on 5 December 2025, however, it was later postponed multiple times due to pending post-production work.

=== Home media ===
The post-theatrical digital streaming rights of the film were acquired by JioHotstar for ₹160 crore. The film began streaming on JioHotstar from 6 February 2026 in Telugu and dubbed versions of Tamil, Kannada and Malayalam languages. The Hindi dubbed version began streaming on the same platform from 6 March 2026.

== Reception ==
The film received negative reviews from critics, who criticized the screenplay and runtime.

BVS Prakash of Deccan Chronicle rated the film 2 out of 5 stars and termed the film "missed opportunity" weighed down by a thin plot, stale humour, and uneven execution. Mitali Gautam of The Statesman rated the film 2 out of 5 stars and noted that "the film struggles in storytelling. ‘The Raja Saab’ feels more like a series of ideas loosely tied together especially around the theme of hypnotism. The writing lacks cohesion, and the screenplay leaves much to be desired. Scenes often jump abruptly. Characters are introduced hastily and that too without proper narrative flow."

Swaroop Kodur of The Indian Express rated the film 2 out of 5 stars and stated that "the film cruelly does little to nothing with its solid central idea, and instead remains sloppy and outdated from start to finish". Saibal Chatterjee of NDTV rated the film 2 out of 5 and termed the film "a royal mess" and also mentioned the film is Only for Prabhas fans.

Neeshita Nyayapati of Hindustan Times rated the film 2 out of 5 stars and stated that "The horror comedy genre isn’t necessarily new to Indian cinema or Tollywood. When films like Bhool Bhulaiyaa (2007) and Anando Brahma (2017) exist, it’s lazy to build an intriguing setup and throw some cool ideas at the audience to see what sticks." Bollywood Hungama rated the film 2 out of 5 stars and noted "On the whole, THE RAJASAAB starts off with an interesting premise and boasts of a striking interval point, but the second half becomes unbearable thanks to the messy and stretched writing and poor direction."

Janani K of India Today rated the film 1.5 out of 5 stars and termed the screenplay "muddled" which jumps aimlessly between genres and locations, also stated "Despite Prabhas's sporadic comic timing, the film lacks depth, cohesion and basic storytelling craft". Suhas Sistu of The Hans India rated the film 1.5 out of 5 stars and stated, "The Raja Saab is a forgettable outing that highlights how star power alone cannot compensate for weak writing and unclear vision."

Chandra Mouli of The Siasat Daily rated the film 1.5 out of 5 stars and noted "The Raja Saab is a missed opportunity. It has poor graphics, a weak story, and bad editing." Sajin Shrijith of The Week rated the film 1 out of 5 stars and noted "The RajaSaab is so confused about what it wants to do and when to do it that everything else — the few positive aspects — feels like a wasted effort."

Amit Bhatia of ABP Live rated the film 1 out of 5 stars and wrote "Calling it a bad film wouldn’t be accurate—it’s far worse than that." Balakrishna Ganeshan of The News Minute termed the film as "loud, lazy, and hopelessly outdated".

=== Box office ===
The film collected ₹9.15 crore from paid previews the day before release and opened with ₹53.75 crore domestically and ₹100.9 crore worldwide. The film grossed ₹6 crore in Hindi on its opening day. The film grossed ₹170 crore worldwide by the end of its first weekend worldwide. The film collected ₹208.38 crore worldwide by the end of its run.

== Sequel ==
In the film's end credits, a sequel titled RajaSaab 2: Circus 1935 was announced.
