= Ekhon Nedekha Nodir Xhipare =

- Theatrical release poster
- Directed by: Bidyut Kotoky
- Written by: Bidyut Kotoky
- Produced by: National Film Development Corporation of India
- Starring: Sanjay Suri; Bidita Bag; Victor Banerjee; Nakul Vaid; Raj Zutshi; Naved Aslam; Preeti Jhangiani
- Cinematography: Madhu Ambat
- Edited by: Rajesh Parmar
- Music by: Zubeen Garg
- Release date: 14 September 2012
- Running time: 90 minutes
- Country: India
- Languages: Assamese; Hindi
- Box office: est. ₹1 crore

Ekhon Nedekha Nodir Xhipare (English: On the other bank of the unseen river) is a 2012 Assamese language socio-political thriller film, with some dialogue in Hindi, starring Sanjay Suri and Bidita Bag in the lead roles. It was directed by Bidyut Kotoky and produced by National Film Development Corporation of India. The film was simultaneously made in Hindi as As the river flows.

The story was inspired by the kidnapping of activist Sanjoy Ghosh, who was first abducted in 1997 from the island Majuli in Assam supposed to be by the United Liberation Front of Asom (ULFA) and subsequently killed. A controversy developed when it got rejected by the jury of the 59th National Film Awards in the category of best Assamese film for being "not Assamese".

== Plot ==
Sridhar Ranjan, a social activist, has gone missing from Majuli, Assam. After almost seven years, when as per law he is about to be officially declared dead, his old journalist friend Abhijit Shandilya (Sanjay Suri) goes in search of Sridhar from Mumbai to Majuli. In Majuli, Abhijit finds himself to be a stranger of sorts in a place that's infested with terrorists and where both the police and the terrorists seem to be suspicious of him. He befriends his local guide Sudakshina (Bidita Bag). Sudakshina apparently was the guide for Sridhar when he came to Majuli initially. She, however, seems to be living with her own fears and stops short of getting close to Abhijit whenever an occasion comes up. The rest of the story revolves around Abhijit trying to solve the mystery behind the disappearance of Sridhar.

== Cast ==
- Sanjay Suri as Abhijit Shandilya, an old friend of Sridhar Ranjan
- Bidita Bag as Sudakshina, a local guide in Majuli
- Victor Banerjee as grandfather of Sudakshina
- Nakul Vaid as Jyotiraj, brother of Sudakshina
- Raj Zutshi as Jayanta Doley, an ex-militant
- Naved Aslam as Sub-Divisional police officer Sameer Agarwal
- Preeti Jhangiani

== Production ==
Bidyut Kotoky, the director of Ekhon Nedekha Nodir Xhipare, said that the story has nothing to do with the disappearance of Sanjay Ghose and it is not based on his life. According to him, "if a person like Sanjay Ghose existed, then somebody like Sridhar Ranjan – the protagonist of my film – could also have existed in Majuli. True, the film is inspired by the unfortunate disappearance of Sanjay Ghose – but inspiration ends there. The entire story is totally fictitious..."

The film was shot in Assam's Majuli river island, Jorhat and Mumbai.

The film features a poem recitation by Dr. Bhupen Hazarika. It was recorded on 10 February 2010 and featured on the opening. In Bidyut Kotoky's words, "The poem represents the voice of the river Brahmaputra through the voice of the music maestro. Late Hazarika is known for his passion for the mighty river and is called the 'Bard of Brahmaputra'. So, when I needed someone to represent the voice of the river in my film, I immediately decided to approach Dr. Hazarika. ... He was ailing and not well when I approached him for recording the recitation for the film. However, he agreed to lend his voice and we finally recorded the recitation in February 2010."

The music was composed by Zubeen Garg and cinematography was done by veteran cinematographer Madhu Ambat.

== Release ==
The film was released on 14 September 2012 in 9 theatres across Assam. Its first public screening of was held on 29 July 2012 at 12th Osian's Cinefan Film Festival held in New Delhi. It was screened by the cultural affairs department of the Maharashtra government on 8 September 2012 in Mumbai to mark Bhupen Hazarika’s birth anniversary.

== Reception ==
=== Critical reception ===
The film received generally positive reviews. Utpal Borpujari said that Bidyut Kotoky made a "promising debut." Film writer Arunlochan Das rated Ekhon Nedekha Nodir Xhipare to be a "good film based on reality." Seven Sisters Post praised the acting of Raj Zutshi and said that the film is "an honest attempt to tell the truth."

== Awards and accolades ==
Bidyut Kotoky won Best Screenplay award for Ekhon Nedekha Nodir Xhipare in the Assam State Film Awards for 2010–2012, which was presented on 10 March 2013 at Machkhowa, Guwahati. Jeevan Initiative, a voluntary trust from Assam, included the film in its list of 'Special 10 of the year 2012 for Assam' and cited, "this cinema aesthetically unveils an almost forgotten story of our recent political history."

Ekhon Nedekha Nodir Xhipare was selected for screening in the second edition of the Washington DC South Asian Film Festival held from 10 May 2013. The film was awarded for the Best Script and Best Actor at the same festival. The film won the Audience Choice Award at the North Carolina International South Asian Film Festival (NCISAFF) for 2014.

== Controversy ==
Ekhon Nedekha Nodir Xhipare was sent to compete in the category of best Assamese film in 59th National Film Awards. But the 11-member jury, led by Rohini Hattangadi, rejected the film for "lack of cultural purity". Assamese filmmaker Hiren Bora, one of the jury members, said that, "The jury was of the view that a major chunk of the film was shot in Mumbai and most of the dialogues were in Hindi." This led to a controversy since the official censorship authority in India had already certified the film as Assamese. A public-interest litigation was filed by enajori.com, a socio-cultural organisation that promotes cultural heritage of Assam, against the jury's decision. In response to the plea the Delhi High Court issued a notice to the Ministry of Information and Broadcasting, the Directorate of Film Festivals, the Central Board of Film Certification, Rohini Hattangadi (chairperson of Feature Film section), and Hiren Bora.

After examining the documents submitted for the selection of regional films, the High Court dismissed the plea. The proceedings revealed that Ekhon Nedekha Nodir Xhipare, and other films from the eastern region, were previewed and rejected by the jury. The court imposed costs of ₹2,000 (US$24) on the petitioner for moving to the court without ascertaining the facts of the case.

An online campaign was created to support the film. Many film personalities, such as Nandita Das, Amol Gupte, Rajesh Parmar, Adil Hussain etc. have pledged support to the campaign.
