= One Night Stand (2016 film) =

2016 film by Jasmine D'Souza

- Theatposter
- Directed by: Jasmine Moses D'souza
- Written by: Niranjan Iyengar (Dialogues)
- Story by: Bhavani Iyer
- Produced by: Furquan Khan Pradeep Sharma
- Starring: Sunny Leone; Tanuj Virwani
- Cinematography: Rakesh Singh
- Edited by: Anukool Duvedi; Premchandra Duvedi
- Music by: Songs: Jeet Gannguli; Meet Bros; Tony Kakkar; Vivek Kar; Background Score: Sandeep Shirodkar
- Production company: Swiss Entertainment
- Release date: 6 May 2016
- Running time: 99 minutes
- Country: India
- Language: Hindi
- Box office: est.₹41.9 million (US$440,000)_{India}

One Night Stand is a 2016 Indian Hindi erotic romantic drama film written by Bhavani Iyer and directed by Jasmine D'Souza. It features Tanuj Virwani and Sunny Leone in the lead roles. The film centers on a man who ends up becoming obsessed with a woman he has a one night stand with. Principal photography was wrapped up in 55 days and filming locations included Mumbai, Bangkok and Pune. The film was released on 6 May 2016. The film was also dubbed in Telugu and Tamil .

== Plot ==
The movie starts off with a flashback that's being narrated by Urvil. It is the flashback and a series of events from his past that has defined his present. The flashback starts off with a fashion show organised by his event management agency in Phuket, Thailand. And after completing the event successfully, Urvil and his colleagues go drinking to celebrate. It is here that his friends challenge him to speak to a rank stranger for a few thousand rupees. An attempt to win the bet gets him introduced to the stranger who, in turn, introduces herself as Celina. What follows after that, is unlimited liquor drinking by the two of them, which ultimately lands them up in bed together. But, the very next day, when Urvil gets up, he finds out that Celina has already left the room, without leaving any details of her whereabouts. And when Urvil comes back to his home in Pune, he is welcomed by his beautiful and dutiful wife Simran. Things are absolutely smooth between the couple, until one day Urvil accidentally spots Celina in the same mall wherein he has gone for shopping with his wife Simran. That very sight of Celina freshens up his 'one night stand' with her, which, in turn, gets translated into his desperation to meet her again. Thereafter begins his unending quest to hunt down Celina from the length and the breadth of the world. Amidst all this, Urvil gets extremely busy with his company's big-budget event of a product launch.

It is here where he gets introduced to his rich client Adhiraj Kapoor and his family, which takes the daylights out of Urvil. The mysterious lady Celina is none other than Ambar, wife of Adhiraj, who, along with their young son Jahaan and Adhiraj's father Raghav, stay in their posh villa in Koregaon Park, Pune. Urvil loses interest in his job and wife and stalks Celina/ Ambar. His colleague David advises him to forget Ambar in order to save his marriage but he ignores his advice. Urvil tails Ambar continuously. Being fed up, she asks him to leave her alone and forget whatever happened between them as 'one night stand' but he refuses to do so and Urvil haunts her so much that he reaches their home and embarrasses Ambar. He rapes Simran, uttering Celina(Ambar)'s name. She picks up a fight with him and on the pretext of dropping him to his office, she races their car in the busy street asking Urvil to confess as to who is Celina and about their affair. He is terrified due to the rashly driven speeding car and admits to Simran about the illegitimate affair with Celina. She drops him on the road-side and tells him that it's all over between them. He returns home and begs her to pardon him for his folly but Simran is firm in refusing. Ultimately, Ambar calls Urvil to a spot on the highway to inform him that he should forget whatever happened between them and leave her alone. Urvil blames her for his marriage turmoil but she retorts that he was himself responsible. When Urvil threatens her that he would reveal the secret to Adhiraj, she informs him that she would do so herself irrespective of the consequence. She leaves him alone brooding about his future. The film ends with Urvil quitting his job and moving ahead in life in search of a new beginning.

== Cast ==
- Tanuj Virwani as Urvil Shekhar Raisingh
- Sunny Leone as Celina/Ambar Kapoor,
- Nyra Banerjee as Simran Raisingh, Urvil's wife
- Khalid Siddiqui as Adhiraj Kapoor
- Kanwaljit Singh as Raghav Kapoor, Adhiraj's father
- Ninad Kamat as David
- Narendra Jetley as Azad Awasthi
- Shishir Sharma as Mr. Walia
- Kushagra Singh as Samar
- Kapil Punjabi as Dilip Shah
- Aamir Ahmed as Siddharth Ahuja aka Sid
- Farhana Fatema as Jyoti
- Ashai Sachdeva as Rohit
- Shatakshi Dubey as Tanya
- Kiyomi Mehta as Deepa, wife of David
- Rehan Pathan as Jahaan Kapoor, son of Adhiraj
- Geeta Bisht as Diya
- Raju as Shyam, help
- Kartik Damani as customer
- Elli Avram as Sana

== Production ==
Rana Daggubati was replaced by Tanuj Virwani due to the former's lack of dates as he was committed for his Telugu film Baahubali. Sunny Leone started preparing for her role since December 2014. Filming was wrapped up in 55 days.

== Soundtrack ==
The music for the film was composed by Jeet Gannguli, Meet Bros, Tony Kakkar and Vivek Kar, while the background score was composed by Sandeep Shirodkar. The lyrics were penned by Kumaar, Manoj Muntashir and Shabbir Ahmed. The first song "Do Peg Maar" was released on 30 March 2016. The second song "Ijazat" released on 4 April 2016. The soundtrack was released on 6 April 2016 by T-Series.

No.	Title	Lyrics	Music	Singer(s)	Length
1.	"Do Peg Maar"	Kumaar	Tony Kakkar	Neha Kakkar	3:58
2.	"Ijazat"	Shabbir Ahmed	Meet Bros	Arijit Singh, Meet Bros	4:47
3.	"Ishq Da Sutta"	Kumaar	Meet Bros	Jasmine Sandlas, Meet Bros	4:24
4.	"Le Chala"	Manoj Muntashir	Jeet Gannguli	Jubin Nautiyal	4:48
5.	"Ki Kara"	Kumaar	Vivek Kar	Shipra Goyal	5:29
6.	"Tum Mere"	Kumaar	Vivek Kar	Dev Negi	3:23
Total length:					26:55

== Box office ==
=== India ===
The film collected ₹ 60 lacs on its opening day then it collected ₹ 61 lacs and ₹ 75 lacs on its second and third day respectively which bring film to weekend collection of ₹ 19.6 million. From fourth to seventh day film collected ₹ 1 crore, then its last six days collection of ₹ 6 lacs brings film to a total collection of ₹ 30.2 million in India. The film reached to a lifetime grossing of ₹41.9 million (US$440,000) in India.
