= Anaganaga O Premakatha =

Indian romantic drama film

- Theatrical release poster
- Directed by: Pratap Tatamsetti
- Produced by: K L N Raju
- Starring: Viraj Ashwin; Riddhi Kumar
- Cinematography: Edurolu Raju
- Edited by: Marthand K. Venkatesh
- Music by: KC Anjan
- Production company: Lights Media Pvt Ltd
- Release date: 14 December 2018
- Country: India
- Language: Telugu

Anaganaga O Premakatha (transl. Once upon a love story) is a 2018 Indian Telugu-language romantic drama film directed by Pratap Tatamsetti and starring Viraj Ashwin and Riddhi Kumar. It was released to negative reviews.

== Cast ==
- Viraj Ashwin as Surya
- Riddhi Kumar as Ananya
- Radha Bangaru as Pooja
- Y. Kasi Viswanath
- Anish Kuruvilla as Ananya's father
- Venu Yeldandi
- Ananth

== Production ==
This film marks the debut production of D. V. S. Raju's son-in-law, K. L. N. Raju.

== Soundtrack ==
The music was composed by KC Anjan. The music of Charlie (2015) was used in the trailer. Puri Jagannadh and Sekhar Kammula each released one song respectively.

== Reception ==
A critic from The Times of India rated the film one-and-a-half out of five stars and wrote that "Director Pratap makes you believe Anaganaga O Premakatha is going in one direction, that it has the semblance of a story and is coherent before dropping the pretense soon".
