= Kis Kis Ki Kismat =

- Poster
- Directed by: Govind Menon
- Written by: Govind Menon
- Produced by: Vivek Nayak
- Starring: Dharmendra; Mallika Sherawat
- Cinematography: Uday Devare
- Edited by: Ashmith Kunder
- Music by: D. Imman
- Release date: 22 October 2004
- Country: India
- Language: Hindi

Kis Kis Ki Kismat is a 2004 Indian black comedy film directed by Govind Menon Presented by Akbar Arabiyan (Mojdeh and Mojtaba Movies), starring Dharmendra and Mallika Sherawat. Supporting roles were played by Satish Shah, Tinnu Anand, Jagdeep, Viju Khote, Dinesh Hingoo and Shivaji Satam. Tamil composer D. Imman composed the music, making his Bollywood debut. The film received negative reviews.

== Cast ==
- Dharmendra as Hasmukh Mehta
- Mallika Sherawat as Meena Madhok
- Rati Agnihotri as Kokila Hasmukh Mehta
- Siddharth Makkar as Harish Mehta
- Satish Shah as Ahmed Rafsanjani
- Kurush Deboo as Khaled Mahmud
- Tinnu Anand as Aditya Sanganeria
- Dinesh Hingoo as Laal Madhok , Meena's maternal uncle
- Jagdeep as Dipankar Chattopadya
- Geeta Khanna as Lily
- Viju Khote as Gogi Dhanda / Inspector Dhandekar
- Tiku Talsania as Nimesh Popley
- Suresh Menon as Ramalingam
- Shivaji Satam as Minister Yeshwant Deshmukh
- Chetan Pandit as Fatman
- Ajit Kulkarni as Mehta's partner
- Manmauji

== Soundtrack ==
The music was composed by D. Imman and released by Das Music. All lyrics were penned by Farhad Wadia.

Kis Kis Ki Kismat

Soundtrack album by D. Imman
- Released: 13 January 2004
- Recorded: 2004
- Genre: Soundtrack
- Length: 41:22
- Label: Das Music
- Producer: D. Imman

D. Imman chronology
Giri (2004)	Kis Kis Ki Kismat (2004)	Thaka Thimi Tha (2005)

Track list
No.	Title	Singer(s)	Length
1.	"Talk Of The Town"	Asha Bhosle	4:58
2.	"Kis Kiski Kismat"	Sonu Nigam	5:02
3.	"Uff A Jawani"	K. S. Chithra	4:29
4.	"Shaadi Barbaadi"	Kunal Ganjawala, D. Imman; T. S. Ranganathan	4:14
5.	"Garmaagaram Gossip"	D. Imman, Suchitra Krishnamoorthi	4:17
6.	"Honey Moon"	Sonu Nigam, Sonu Kakkar	4:44
7.	"The Khwahish Theme"	Karthik, Mathangi	13:38
Total length:			41:22
