= Viraj Ashwin =

Indian actor

- Ashwin in 2023
- Born: Jajarapu Viraj Ashwin; India
- Education: Gandhi Institute of Technology and Management, Visakhapatnam
- Occupation: Actor
- Years active: 2018–present

Viraj Ashwin is an Indian actor who has appeared in Telugu film. He debuted as a lead in Anaganaga O Premakatha (2018) and gained recognition for his role in Baby (2023).

== Personal life ==
Viraj Ashwin was born in a Telugu family in India to Venkateswararao Jarajapu and Venkateswari Jarajapu. His father was a retired scientist in the Indian Space Research Organisation (ISRO). Viraj is the grandson of the late film editor K. A. Marthand, nephew of film editor Marthand K. Venkatesh and film director Shankar K. Marthand, and great-grandnephew of B. A. Subba Rao.

== Career ==
Viraj Ashwin made his debut with the Pratap Tatamsetti-directed romantic drama Anaganaga O Premakatha (2018) produced by K.L.N Raju. He played the lead role in the Telugu short film Manasanamaha (2020) which won many awards. He acted in the 2021 film Thank You Brother, directed by Ramesh Raparthi and produced by Magunta Sarath Chandra Reddy, and played the lead role in the 2022 film Valliddari Madhya.

Viraj Ashwin's Baby was released in July 2023 to positive reviews from critics and grossed ₹100 crore worldwide.

== Filmography ==
=== Films ===
Key
†	Denotes films that have not yet been released

List of Viraj Ashwin film credits
Year	Title	Role	Notes	Ref.
2018	Anaganaga O Premakatha	Surya	credited as Ashwin J. Viraj	
2020	Manasanamaha	Surya	Short film	
2021	Thank You Brother	Abhi		
2022	Valliddari Madhya	Varun		
2023	Maya Petika	Ali		
2023	Baby	Viraj		
2023	Jorugaa Husharugaa	Santhosh		
2023	Hi Nanna	Dr. Ashok Bhatia		
2024	Sriranga Neethulu			
2026	Mareechika	Sanjay		
