= Chidiya (film) =

- Theatrical release poster
- Directed by: Mehran Amrohi
- Written by: Mehran Amrohi
- Produced by: Faqhrul Husaini; Akbar Hussaini; Sudhir Kolte; Vinit Rukari
- Starring: Vinay Pathak; Amruta Subhash; Svar Kamble; Ayush Pathak; Hetal Gada
- Cinematography: Vikas Joshi
- Edited by: Mohit Takalkar
- Music by: Score: Shailendra Barve; Lyrics: Jeetendra Joshi; Mehran Amrohi
- Production companies: Smiley Films; Key Media Works
- Distributed by: Reliance Entertainment
- Release dates: 28 May 2016 (Zlín Film Festival); 30 May 2025
- Running time: 110 minutes
- Country: India
- Language: Hindi

Chidiya is a 2016 Hindi-language drama film directed by Mehran Amrohi and produced by Faqhrul Husaini under the banner of Smiley Films in association with Key Media Works. The film stars Vinay Pathak, Amruta Subhash, Svar Kamble, Ayush Pathak, Inaamulhaq, Brijendra Kala, and Muzaffar Khan.

Set against the backdrop of a Mumbai chawl, Chidiya follows the story of two young brothers who aspire to play badminton, overcoming the limitations of their modest environment. The film explores themes of childhood resilience, hope, community spirit, and the beauty of small dreams.

== Plot ==
Shanu and Bua, two young brothers living in a cramped chawl in Mumbai, discover a birdie while seeking work at a film studio. This discovery sparks a dream that seems far beyond their reach. With their mother’s unwavering support and the quirky neighbors rallying behind them, the boys transform a junkyard into their own badminton court. Their journey, marked by trials and imagination, becomes a tribute to youthful determination and the power of dreams.

== Cast ==
- Vinay Pathak as Bali
- Amruta Subhash as Vaishnavi
- Inaamulhaq as Taj (Cameo)
- Brijendra Kala as Suraj
- Svar Kamble as Shanu
- Ayush Pathak as Bua
- Hetal Gada as Ishani
- Sandeep Pathak as Tapan

== Production ==
Principal photography for Chidiya was completed in 2015. The chawl sequences were filmed in Pune, while additional scenes were shot at the Film and Television Institute of India (FTII). Exterior shots were filmed in Mumbai, including locations at Kamal Amrohi Studio. Director Mehran Amrohi sought to employ a poetic realism style, utilizing natural lighting and locations to authentically depict the world of the characters.

== Delayed Release ==
Although completed in 2015, Chidiya faced distribution challenges due to shifting trends in independent cinema. Despite nearly a decade-long delay, the film’s core themes remained resonant, leading to a confirmed theatrical release in 2025.

== Release ==
Chidiya has released theatrically across India on 30 May 2025. The film was previously scheduled for release on 23 May 2025. The official trailer of the film released on 19 May 2025. Chidiya is now available on Amazon Prime Video. The digital release marked the film’s wider outreach to audiences after a celebrated festival run and positive critical reception. The film was released on the platform under the “Rent” category, allowing viewers to access it on demand.

== Music ==
The music for Chidiya is composed by Shailendra Barve and released by Zee Music Company. The soundtrack consists of the following songs.

Track listing
| No. | Title | Lyrics | Singer(s) | Length |
|---|---|---|---|---|
| 1. | "Aye Dil Ki Nanhi Chidiya" | Mehran Amrohi | Divya Kumar | 4:00 |
| 2. | "Sasura Mera Natka" | Jitendra Joshi | Chorus | 2:25 |
| 3. | "Badal Barse" | Jitendra Joshi | Divya Kumar | 2:38 |
| 4. | "Dono Taraf Sannata" | Mehran Amrohi | Vijay Prakash | 4:17 |

== Reception ==
Deepa Gahlot of Rediff.com gave 3 stars out of 5 and said that "The tone of the film may be gloomy but it is never tragic or hopeless. Like millions of underprivileged people who find joy in small things, Shanu, Bua and their mother keep their heads above water".

Rahul Desai of The Hollywood Reporter India praised the film. He writes, "What I like the most is the film’s ability to be practical about a hopeful anti-fairytale. It doesn’t package false promises and happily ever afters for the sake of fiction. For better or worse, being spot-boys on a set full of colourful people is the kids’ destiny — it isn’t supposed to change. There is no Aamir Khan-coded saviour or social-commentary climax. Any joys of adolescence that they manage to locate from hereon is within the confines of this future — like an empty badminton court at a school on an outdoor shoot, or a short holiday between schedules."

Sana Farzeen of India Today gave 4 stars out of 5 and said that "in an age where content is abundant, but emotion often feels diluted, Chidiya is a rare gem. Honest, heartwarming, funny, and beautifully detailed — it reminds us of why we fell in love with cinema in the first place." Devesh Sharma of Filmfare also gave 4 stars out of 5 and observed that "Chidiya is a children’s film which has a poignant message about child labour even as it showcases small dreams and desires of its child protagonists." Dhaval Roy of The Times of India rated 3.5/5 stars and said "Chidiya is a must-watch family fare, offering simple yet profound storytelling that warms the heart and leaves you smiling."

Subhash K Jha writing for News 24 rated 5/5 stars and praise the film and said "Chidiya is a gem of a film, an instant classic, if you will. It conveys what the director so succinctly describes as “the joy in scarcity” with such an austere stare at neo-realism, I immediately want to put him up there with the masters of neo-realism Vittorio de Sica and Satyajit Ray." Amit Bhatia of ABP News gave 4 stars out of 5 and said that "The film is a reminder of the art that has the power to save cinema from its financial and creative struggles." Sanyukta Thakare of Mashable India commented that "Chidiya is about letting go of the expectation and being yourself, what little you can for everyday not matter what the world throws at you."

Rishabh Suri of Hindustan Times gave 3.5 stars out of 5 and writes that "Chidiya is a gentle reminder of the power of small dreams and everyday kindness. It may not roar with dramatic highs, but it speaks in a sincere voice that stays with you."
