= Manasanamaha =

- Directed by: Deepak Reddy
- Written by: Deepak Reddy
- Produced by: Gajjala Shilpa
- Starring: Viraj Ashwin; Drishika Chander; Valli Raghavender; Prithvi Sharma; Bunny Abhiran.
- Cinematography: Edurolu Raju
- Music by: Syed Kamran
- Production company: UV Creations
- Release date: 28 March 2020
- Running time: 16 minutes 24 seconds
- Country: India
- Language: Telugu

Manasanamaha (transl. Salutations to Mind) is a 2020 Indian Telugu-language non-linear romantic drama short film written and directed by Deepak Reddy. It was produced by Gajjala Shilpa starring Viraj Ashwin and Drishika Chander.work

The film was screened at various film festivals and received many accolades as well as being Oscar(Academy Award)-qualified and BAFTA-qualified. The film was officially entered into the Guinness World Records for the Most Awards won by a Short Film in May 2022. The film was critically acclaimed and received praise for its story, performances and direction.

== Plot ==
Surya (Viraj Aswin) is a young man who narrates the story about his three past love relationships. The love interests in the story represent three different seasons, Chaithra (summer), Varsha (rainy) and Seetha (winter). The three names represent his three past partners. The film is narrated in a reverse with each scene unfolding backwards to the starting point from the ending.

== Cast ==
- Viraj Ashwin as Surya
- Drishika Chander as Chaithra
- Valli Raghavender as Varsha
- Prithvi Sharma as Seetha
- Bunny Abhiran as Surya's friend
- Baby Sahasra
- Satya Varma
- Deepak Varma
- Mahesh

== Production ==
The film is Reddy's third short film. It was with a production budget of US$5000. The film was shot in 5 days but had an excessive pre-production and post-production work. Deepak's team designed 2D animated storyboards so that the crew had no ambiguity in what to execute.

== Soundtrack ==
The music is composed by Kamran.

Track listing
No.	Title	Lyrics	Singer(s)	Length
1.	"Kanapadava"	Lakshmi Priyanka	Yazin Nizar	3:11
Total length:				3:11

== Reception ==
Taryll Baker of ukfilmreview in his review about the film wrote that "Manasanamaha is a perfect display of the greatness of world cinema, and how talented these filmmakers are. In terms of concept, it’s fairly straightforward. But on a technical level, this short film raised the bar. Manasanamaha is a fantastic, stunning, colourful and uplifting film, not to be missed. Several scenes shift from a point-of-view perspective, back to the usual ‘fourth wall.’ It's these shifts, paired with the reverse effect that makes Manasanamaha so inviting and engaging. There's a lot of creativity oozing from every frame, not only visually but musically, too."

Adva Reichman of Cult Critic wrote that "The cinematic choices elevated the script. The shots were exact, and were used perfectly while toying with our expectations, the camera work was impeccable and precise, and the acting was on point and endearing, thus making the overall outcome worth your time and attention."

Film Threat's Alan Ng wrote that "I loved this short film. It’s smart and insightful…and it comes from my guy’s perspective. It’s honest enough to admit that we have our own hangups and foibles when it comes to the other sex. There’s an animation element that I’m not sure was needed, but a solid short film all around with the scenes in reverse as its highlight. Manasanamaha is a production from India, but the challenges of finding love are universal."

== Accolades ==
=== Official selections and awards ===
Festival/Event	Location	Country
Catalina Film Festival	Los Angeles	United States
Northeast Film Festival	New Jersey	United States
Woods Hole Film Festival	Massachusetts	United States
Carmarthen Bay Film Festival (BAFTA Qualifier)	Wales	United Kingdom
San Francisco Frozen Film Festival	Bay Area	United States
Lake City International Film Festival	Gwalior	India
Bengaluru international Short Film Festival (Oscar qualifying)	Bengaluru	India
Bare Bones International Film Festival	Oklahoma	United States
Idyllwild International Festival of Cinema	California	United States
Garden State Film Festival	New Jersey	United States
Indian Film Festival of Melbourne	Melbourne	Australia
Crystal Palace international Film Festival	London	United Kingdom
Jaipur international Film Festival	Jaipur	India
Cyrus International Film Festival of Toronto	Toronto	Canada
Detroit Trinity International Film Festival	Detroit	United States
WorldFest-Houston International Film Festival	Texas	United States
Dublin International Short Film and Music Festival	Dublin	Ireland
Tagore International Film Festival	Kolkata	India
Oregon Short Film Festival	Oregon	United States
Harlem International Film Festival	New York	United States
Long Island International Film Expo	New York	United States
