= Kushan Nandy =

Indian film producer, writer and director

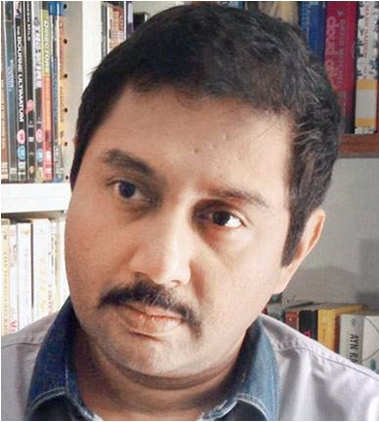
- Born: Kushan Nandy; Kolkata, West Bengal, India
- Occupation(s): Film director, producer, writer
- Years active: 1994 to present
- Father: Pritish Nandy

Kanishka Kushan Nandy, (better known as Kushan Nandy) is an Indian film producer, writer and director. He produces films under the banner of the current entertainment house Movies by the Mob. He turned independent director in television, went on to making documentaries, music videos and advert films following which he turned his focus onto his passion of directing Hindi feature films.

== Career ==
He turned independent director in television for Doordarshan, Zee TV and Shahra TV. He went on to making documentaries, music videos and advert films following which he turned his focus on to directing Hindi feature films. His first feature film was 88 Antop Hill, starring Atul Kulkarni followed by Hum Dum which received mention at various film festivals in India and overseas. Following this Kushan produced and directed documentaries and short films for International partners in North America, Hong Kong and United Kingdom.

His film Babumoshai Bandookbaaz, starring Nawazuddin Siddique in the lead role, was released in August 2017.

.

== Filmography ==
As Director

- 88 Antop Hill (2003)
- Hum Dum (2005)
- Babumoshai Bandookbaaz (2017)
- Jogira Sara Ra Ra (2023)

TV Program

- Do Lafzon Ki Kahani
- The locked Room (X Zone)
- Mumbai City Scam (Zee Thriller at 10)
- Diamonds are for ever(Zee Thriller at 10)
- Fatal attraction (Zee Thriller at 10)
- Zee Millinium Show
- Ek Raja Ek Rani
- Raajkahaani
- Yudh
