= Babumoshai Bandookbaaz =

2017 film by Kushan Nandy

Babumoshai Bandookbaaz.
- Directed by: Kushan Nandy
- Written by: Ghalib Asad Bhopali
- Produced by: Kiran Shyam Shroff; Ashmith Kunder; Kushan Nandy
- Starring: Nawazuddin Siddiqui; Bidita Bag; Jatin Goswami; Shraddha Das; Divya Dutta; Thiago Juliaci
- Cinematography: Vishal Vittal
- Edited by: Ashmith Kunder; Kushan Nandy
- Music by: Gaurav Dagaonkar; Abhilash Lakra; Joel Dubba; Debojyoti Mishra
- Production companies: Movies by the Mob; KNKSPL
- Distributed by: AA Films
- Release date: 25 August 2017
- Running time: 122 minutes
- Country: India
- Language: Hindi
- Budget: ₹ 100 million
- Box office: ₹ 126 million

Babumoshai Bandookbaaz (transl. The gunman Babu) is a 2017 Indian Hindi-language action thriller film directed by Kushan Nandy and produced by Kiran Shyam Shroff and Ashmith Kunder. The film features Nawazuddin Siddiqui and Bidita Bag in the lead roles. The movie did average business at the box office.

== Plot ==
In Uttar Pradesh's political landscape, dominated by rivals Dubey and Jiji, Babu Bihari works as a hitman for both. He charges ₹20,000 per hit, giving ₹5,000 to the constable who arranges the job. Known for his ferocity and clean, straightforward kills, Babu lives simply in a remote shanty. Jiji assigns Babu to kill a local muscleman. While surveying his target, Babu meets Phulwa, a cobbler. Attracted by her beauty and strong personality, he attempts to court her but is rejected. Babu proceeds with the hit, which Phulwa witnesses.

Phulwa doesn't identify Babu to the police. He confronts her; she stabs him in self-defense. Babu learns the victim and his brothers had raped Phulwa. She promises Babu anything if he kills the remaining brothers, which he does. Upon return, Jiji is furious as Babu unknowingly ruined her political alliance plans with the brothers, souring their relationship.

Babu and Phulwa have sex. Dubey hires Babu to kill Jiji's three men. Babu informs Jiji, challenging her to protect them. During the first attempt, another hitman with the same contract, Banke (Babu's admirer), interferes. They decide to compete: whoever kills more of the three targets wins; the loser quits. Babu kills one, Banke the second. While injured, Babu is cared for by Phulwa. Babu tests Phulwa and Banke by offering them a night together, which they refuse. Babu and Banke collaborate to kill the third target, Triloki. After succeeding, they celebrate. Banke reveals there was a fourth target and shoots Babu, who falls into a passing train.

Next, we see Babu waking up in a hospital with long hair and a beard, apparently from a long coma. He cleans himself up and returns. His cop friend reveals that after the death of Triloki, Jiji got her entire force to his location, set his house on fire, killing Phulwa as well. Babu is completely heartbroken and swears vengeance for the blood of all the traitors. He first locates Banke and just as he is about to kill him, Banke explains that he just executed his contract, and principally Babu should respect that. He spares his life because Banke had saved his life in the past. Banke tells him that Dubey revealed his address to Jiji. Thereafter, he goes on a killing spree and kills all his enemies. In the end, the secretary of Dubey (who now owns his empire) gives Babu one more contract. Babu refuses and says that he has left the business. He gives him an address and tells him that he has a strong motive to take this contract.

Babu goes to the address and instinctively avoids getting stabbed with a sharp tool, unmistakably from Phulwa. He is surprised to see her alive, and she also has his son. Then comes Banke. It is then revealed that Banke and Phulwa fell in love and had sex unknowing to Babu. It was Phulwa who gave Banke the contract to kill Babu. Babu kills Banke by tricking him into a Russian roulette-styled game. He kills Phulwa as well for her betrayal and burns both of them on a pyre, and keeps the child. In the end, we see Babu raising the child after pledging to stay away from crime. One day while going through the notebook of the child, he finds that the child has drawn a picture of a family in it (mom, dad and child). While looking at the picture, his eyes suddenly widen in surprise as he sees the same child approaching him with a gun held up. In the end, a shot is heard with the words "What goes around comes around."

== Cast ==
- Nawazuddin Siddiqui as Babu Bihari
- Bidita Bag as Phulwa
- Jatin Goswami as Banke Bihari
- Shraddha Das as Jasmine
- Anil George as Dubey Ji
- Bhagwan Tiwari
- Jeetu Shivhare
- Murali Sharma as Triloki
- Divya Dutta as Jiji
- Sachin Chaubey
- Mahesh Chandra Deva as phoolchand Mla candidate
- Rakesh Dubey as a massager
- Jeetu as Groom's Father
- Thiago Juliaci as Hari

== Production ==
=== Casting and development ===
Nawazuddin Siddiqui as Babu plays the role of a sharp shooter for which he took special lessons in handling guns and action. Prague based cinematographer Vishal Vittal was signed in for the film and added an international look to the rustic landscape of Uttar Pradesh while the crisp dialogues of Ghalib Asad Bhopali (son of famous lyricist Asad Bhopali) adds humour and spark to the desi flavour and dialect. A special dialect coach was engaged at the shoot to capture the inherent flavour. Detailed research was done for costumes and sets to give an authentic look. All the songs were choreographed by Jeet Singh.

=== Filming ===
Principal photography of the film's first schedule began in, June 2016, in Uttar Pradesh. The first schedule was completed in July 2016. The film shooting was wrapped up in January 2017 and is due to release on 25 June 2017. The film is made in only 5 crore Indian rupees including print and advertisement.

== Soundtrack ==
Babumoshai Bandookbaaz

Soundtrack album by Gaurav Dagaonkar, Debojyoti Mishra and Anup Bhat
- Released: 16 August 2017
- Genre: Feature film soundtrack
- Length: 29:12
- Language: Hindi
- Label: Saregama

The soundtrack was released on 16 August 2017.

Track listing
No.	Title	Lyrics	Music	Singers(s)	Length
1.	"Barfani (Male)"	Ghalib Asad Bhopali	Gaurav Dagaonkar	Armaan Malik	4:44
2.	"Ghungta"	Ghalib Asad Bhopali	Gaurav Dagaonkar	Neha Kakkar	4:10
3.	"Aye Saiyan"	Ghalib Asad Bhopali	Gaurav Dagaonkar	Orunima Bhattacharya, Vivek Nair	3:44
4.	"Chulbuli"	Ghalib Asad Bhopali	Gaurav Dagaonkar	Papon	4:20
5.	"Khali Khali"	Ghalib Asad Bhopali	Debojyoti Mishra	Mohit Chauhan	5:10
6.	"Barfani (Female)"	Ghalib Asad Bhopali	Gaurav Dagaonkar	Orunima Bhattacharya	4:35
7.	"Postman"	Ghalib Asad Bhopali	Anup Bhat	Geet Sagar	2:29
Total length:					29:12

== Release ==
The film was released in India on 25 August 2017 in 1,200 cinemas.

== Critical response ==
As of June 2020, Babumoshai Bandookbaaz holds a 44% approval rating, on review aggregator website Rotten Tomatoes, based on nine reviews with an average rating of 4.5 out of 10. Rajeev Masand of News18 gave the film a rating of 2.5 out of 5 and said that, "It's a guilty pleasure at best, provocative and titillating. But it's also overlong and derivative, and gives one of our finest actors little room to do much more than repeat himself." Rohit Vats of Hindustan Times gave the film a rating of 2.5 out of 5 and said that, "Babumoshai Bandookbaaz appears superficial because it fails to explore characters and their idiosyncrasies. It's a film pretending to be a stylishly raw gangster saga originated in the interiors of the Hindi heartland, but in reality, it's nothing more than another attempt to look at the crime prone lower strata of society; through a rose tinted glass." Meena Iyer of The Times of India gave the film a rating of 3 out of 5 saying that, "The screenplay could have definitely been tighter. Yet Kushan Nandy gives you a film that you find yourself compulsively watching." Namrata Joshi of The Hindu praised the performances of Nawazuddin Siddiqui, Jatin Gandhi and Bhagwan Tiwari and concluded her review saying that the film is, "Yet another revenge drama set in UP badlands that lacks cohesion despite some strong performances." Saibal Chatterjee of NDTV gave the film a rating of 1.5 out of 5 and said that, "As capricious as its unfounded title, Kushan Nandy's rough-hewn hinterland noir Babumoshai Bandookbaaz is a roaring mess. It misfires on most counts." Shubhra Gupta of The Indian Express gave the film a rating of 2 out of 5 and said that the film has interesting characters. Still, the story has nothing new to offer. Udita Jhunjhunwala of Live Mint criticized the film, saying that "Kushan Nandy's Babumoshai Bandookbaaz is a low-calorie version of Gangs of Wasseypur" in which "Nawazuddin Siddiqui reprises the sort of character audiences have already seen him perfect."
