= List of filmography and awards of Sunny Leone =

Sunny Leone is a Canadian-American actress, model, and former pornstar, currently active in Indian film industry. She was named Penthouse Pet of the Year in 2003, was a contract performer for Vivid Entertainment, and was named by Maxim as one of the 12 top porn stars in 2010. She has played roles in independent mainstream events, films and television shows. Her first mainstream appearance was in 2005, when she worked as a red carpet reporter for the MTV Video Music Awards on MTV India. She participated in the Indian reality television series Bigg Boss (2011–12). She also has been co-hosting the Indian reality TV show Splitsvilla (2014–present). In 2012 she made her Bollywood debut in Pooja Bhatt's erotic thriller Jism 2 (2012) and shifted her focus to mainstream acting which was followed up with Jackpot (2013), Ragini MMS 2 (2014), Ek Paheli Leela (2015), One Night Stand (2016) and Tera Intezaar (2017).

== Filmography ==
Key
†	Denotes films that have not yet been released

Year	Title	Role	Language	Notes	Ref.
2003	Mega Scorpions	Hot Tub Girlfriend	English	Cameo appearance	
2004	The Girl Next Door	Herself	English	Cameo appearance	
2008	Pirate's Blood	Sunny	English		
2010	The Virginity Hit	Sunny	English		
2012	Jism 2	Izna	Hindi	Hindi film debut	
2013	Jackpot	Maya	Hindi		
2013	Shootout at Wadala	Laila	Hindi	Special appearance in the song "Laila"	
2014	Ragini MMS 2	Herself	Hindi		
2014	Vadacurry	Herself	Tamil	Tamil film debut, Special appearance in the song "Low Aana Lifeu"	
2014	Hate Story 2	Herself	Hindi	Special appearance in the song "Pink Lips"	
2014	Balwinder Singh Famous Ho Gaya	Herself	Hindi	Special appearance in the song "Shake That Booty"	
2014	Current Theega	Sunny	Telugu	Telugu film debut, cameo appearance	
2015	DK	Herself	Kannada	Kannada film debut, Special appearance in the song "Sesamma"	
2015	Ek Paheli Leela	Leela / Meera	Hindi		
2015	Kuch Kuch Locha Hai	Shanaya	Hindi		
2015	Luv U Alia	Herself	Kannada	Special appearance in the song "Kamakshi"	
2015	Singh Is Bliing	Airline passenger	Hindi	Cameo appearance	
2016	Mastizaade	Laila Lele / Lily Lele	Hindi		
2016	One Night Stand	Celina / Ambar Kapoor	Hindi		
2016	Mostly Sunny	Herself	English	Documentary	
2016	Beiimaan Love	Sunaina Verma	Hindi		
2016	Fuddu	Herself	Hindi	Special appearance in the song "Tu Zaroorat Nahi Tu Zaroori Hai	"
2016	Dongari Ka Raja	Herself	Hindi	Special appearance in the song "Choli Blockbuster"	
2017	Raees	Herself	Hindi	Special appearance in the song "Laila Main Laila"	
2017	Noor	Herself	Hindi	Cameo appearance	
2017	Baadshaho	Herself	Hindi	Special appearance in song "Piya More"	
2017	Boyz	Herself	Marathi	Marathi film debut, Special appearance in song "Kuth Kuth Jayacha Honeymoon La"	
2017	Bhoomi	Herself	Hindi	Special appearance in song "Trippy Trippy"	
2017	Shrestha Bangali	Herself	Bengali	Special appearance in the song "Chaap Nishna"	
2017	PSV Garuda Vega	Herself	Telugu	Special appearance in song "Deo Deo"	
2017	Tera Intezaar	Rounak	Hindi		
2019	Jhootha Kahin Ka	Herself	Hindi	Special appearance in song "Funk Love"	
2019	Arjun Patiala	Baby Narula	Hindi	2 roles as it's a film inside film	
2019	Madhura Raja	Herself	Malayalam	Special appearance in item song "Moha Mundiri"	
2019	Password	Herself	Nepali	Special appearance in item song "Aajako Sham"	
2019	Motichoor Chaknachoor	Herself	Hindi	Special appearance in song "Battiyan Bujhaado"	
2022	Bikkhov	Herself	Bangla	Special appearance in the song	
2022	Ginna	Renuka/ Ruby D’souza	Telugu		
2022	Champion	Herself	Kannada	Special appearance in the song "Dingar Billi"	
2022	Oh My Ghost	Mayasena	Tamil		
2023	Kennedy	Charlie	Hindi	premier at 2023 Cannes Film Festival	
2023	Thee Ivan	Herself	Tamil	Special appearance in the song "Mela Aagayam"	
2024	Mrudhu Bhave Dhruda Kruthye	Dancer	Malayalam	Special appearance in the song "Fanaa"	
2024	Quotation Gang Part 1	Padma	Tamil		
2024	Petta Rap	Dancer	Tamil	Special appearance in the song "Vechi Seyyuthey"	
2025	Badass Ravi Kumar	Nisha	Hindi	Cameo appearance	
2026	Trimukha		Telugu		
2026	The Maharashtra Files †	Herself	Marathi	Special appearance in the song "Shantabai"	
2026	Rangeela †	TBA	Malayalam	Malayalam film debut, Filming	
2026	Shero †	TBA	Malayalam	Filming	
2026	Helen †	TBA	Hindi	Filming	
2026	The Battle of Bhima Koregaon †	TBA	Hindi	Special appearance in a song	

=== Music videos ===
Year	Title	Singer(s)	Music	Ref.
2014	Saree Wali Girl	Girik Aman	Girik Aman	
2015	Super Girl From China	Kanika Kapoor, Mika Singh	Kanika Kapoor	
2017	Loca Loca	Ariff Khan, Shivi	Ariff Khan, Rap by Raftaar	
2018	Lovely Accident	Taposh, Harjot Kaur	Kaushik Akash Guddu (KAG) for JAM8	
2019	Hollywood Wale Nakhre	Upesh Jangwal	Tanveer Singh Kohli	
2021	Barbie Doll	D Cali	Meet Sehra	
2021	Pardesi	Asees Kaur, Arko Pravo Mukherjee	Arko Pravo Mukherjee	
2021	Machli	Shahid Mallya, Pawni Pandey	Karan Lakhan, Oye Kunaal	
2021	Panghat	Kanika Kapoor, Arindam Chakraborty	Shaarib Sabri, Toshi Sabri	
2021	Dushtu Polapain	Fatima Tuz Zahra Oyshee		
2021	Sharam Lihaaj	Sakshi Holkar		

=== Pornographic films ===
Year	Title	Role
2002	Penthouse Video: Virtual Harem	Sunny
2004	Mystique Presents H20hh	
2004	Busty Cops	Taluca Lake
2004	Lingerie: The Secret Art of Seduction	Sunny
2005	Centerfold Fetish	
2005	Sunny	
2005	Alabama Jones and the Busty Crusade	Queen of the Jungle
2006	Busty Cops 2	Taluca Lake
2006	Virtual Vivid Girl Sunny Leone	Sunny Leone
2006	Sunny & Cher	Sunny
2006	The Female Gardener	
2007	Debbie Does Dallas ... Again	Corky
2007	Sunny Loves Matt	Sunny
2007	It's Sunny in Brazil	
2007	The Sunny Experiment	
2008	The Other Side of Sunny	
2008	Dark Side of the Sun	
2008	Descent Into Bondage	
2008	Costumed Damsels in Distress	Gypsy girl
2008	The House of Naked Captives	
2009	Undress Me	
2009	Deviance	
2009	Naughty America 4 Her 6	
2009	Sunny's Slumber Party	Sunny
2009	Sunny's B/G Adventure	
2010	Live Gonzo	
2010	Shut Up and Fuck Me	
2010	Sunny's Casting Couch: I Wanna Be a Pornstar	
2010	All Sunny All the Time	
2010	Sunny Leone Loves HD Porn	
2010	Sunny Leone Loves HD Porn 2	
2010	Girlfriends 2	
2010	Hocus Pocus XXX	Townsfolk
2010	Gia: Portrait of a Porn Star	Gia
2010	Not Charlie's Angels XXX	Kelly
2011	Roleplay	
2011	Sunny & the Suitcase	Sunny
2011	Lies: Diary of an Escort	
2011	Bang Van Blowout with Nick Swardson	
2012	Sunny Leone: Goddess	
2012	My First Lesbian Experience Vol. 1	
2012	Lesbian Workout	
2012	Sunny Leone: Erotica	
2012	Home Alone	
2013	Charlie's Girl: Georgia Jones	

== Television ==
Year	Title	Role	Notes	Ref.
2005	MTV Awards	Reporter		
2007	Debbie Does Dallas	Herself		
2008	My Bare Lady 2: Open for Business	Contestant		
2008	Co-Ed Confidential	Stripper		
2011–2012	Bigg Boss (season 5)	Contestant	6th place	
2014	Haunted Weekends with Sunny Leone	Host		
2014–present	MTV Splitsvilla	Host		
2016	Box Cricket League (season 2)	Contestant	Team Member of Chennai Swaggers	
2018	Man vs. Wild with Sunny Leone	Host		
2021	One Mic Stand	Herself		
2023	Social Currency	Herself		

== Web series ==
Year	Title	Role	Ref.
2018–2019	Karenjit Kaur – The Untold Story of Sunny Leone	Herself	
2019	Ragini MMS: Returns	Meena	
2021	Bullets	Tina	
2022	Anamika	Anamika	

=== Other media appearances ===
Year	Title	Role	Type	Notes
2001	Livin' It Up	Dancer	Videoclip	Song by Ja Rule
2007	Pocket Pool	Penthouse Pet	PlayStation Portable game	

== Awards and nominations ==
Awards and nominations of Sunny Leone
Year	Award	Category	Nominated work	Result	Ref(s)
2001	Penthouse	March Pet of the Month	—N/a	Won	
2003	Penthouse	Penthouse Pet of the Year	—N/a	Won	
2007	AVN Awards	Best All-Girl Sex Scene - Video	Virtual Vivid Girl Sunny Leone	Nominated	
2008	XBIZ Award	Web Babe of the Year	—N/a	Won	
2009	XBIZ Award	Crossover Star of the Year	My Bare Lady 2 (with Brooke Haven, Casey Parker and Veronica Rayne)	Nominated	
2009	AVN Awards	Best All-Girl Couples Sex Scene	Sunny Loves Matt (with Anne Marie Rios)	Nominated	
2009	AVN Awards	Best Couples Sex Scene	Sunny Loves Matt (with Matt Erickson)	Nominated	
2009	AVN Awards	Best Tease Performance	Sunny Loves Matt	Nominated	
2009	AVN Awards	Best Solo Sex Scene	The Sunny Experiment	Nominated	
2009	AVN Awards	Female Performer of the Year	—N/a	Nominated	
2009	AVN Awards	Jenna Jameson Crossover Star of the Year	My Bare Lady 2 (with Brooke Haven, Casey Parker and Veronica Rayne)	Nominated	
2010	AVN Awards	Best All-Girl Group Sex Scene	Deviance (with Eva Angelina, Teagan Presley and Alexis Texas)	Won	
2010	AVN Awards	Web Starlet of the Year	—N/a	Won	
2010	AVN Awards	Best All-Girl Couples Sex Scene	Sunny's Slumber Party (with Jenna Haze)	Nominated	
2010	AVN Awards	Best All-Girl Group Sex Scene	Sunny's Slumber Party (with Monique Alexander, Alyssa Reece and Alexis Texas)	Nominated	
2010	F.A.M.E. Awards	Favorite Breasts	—N/a	Won	
2010	Fame Registry Award	MVP of the Year	—N/a	Won	
2011	XRCO Awards	Mainstream Adult Media Favourite	—N/a	Nominated	
2011	Fame Registry Award	Porn Star Website of the Year	—N/a	Won	
2011	AVN Awards	Best All-Girl Group Sex Scene	Girlfriends 2 (with Ann Marie Rios, Hailie Vanderven and Sarah Vandella)	Nominated	
2011	AVN Awards	Best All-Girl Group Sex Scene	Girlfriends 2 (with Miles Long, Hailie Vanderven, Ann Marie Rios and Sarah Vandella)	Nominated	
2011	AVN Awards	Crossover Star of the Year	—N/a	Nominated	
2011	AVN Awards	Best Actress	Gia: Portrait of a Porn Star	Nominated	
2011	AVN Awards	Best Three-Way Sex Scene (G/G/B)	Sunny's Big Adventure (with Daisy Marie and Voodoo)	Nominated	
2011	AVN Awards	Best All-Girl 3-Way Sex Scene	Sunny's Big Adventure (with Devi Emmerson and Karlie Montana)	Nominated	
2011	AVN Awards	Best All-Girl Group Sex Scene	Hocus Pocus XXX (with Eva Angelina, Nikki Benz, Kiara Diane, Audrey Hollander and Madelyn Marie)	Nominated	
2011	AVN Awards	Best All-Girl Couples Sex Scene	Gia: Portrait of a Porn Star (with Tori Black)	Nominated	
2012	AVN Awards	Best Girl/Girl Sex Scene	Roleplay (with Daisy Marie)	Nominated	
2012	AVN Awards	Crossover Star of the Year	—N/a	Nominated	
2012	AVN Awards	Best Solo Sex Scene	Lies: Diary of an Escort	Nominated	
2012	XBIZ Awards	Porn Star Site of the Year	sunnyleone.com	Won	
2012	Fame Registry Award	Porn Star Website of the Year	—N/a	Won	
2013	AVN Awards	Crossover Star of the Year (tied with James Deen)	—N/a	Won	
2013	AVN Awards	Best Tease Performance	Lesbian Workout (with Daisy Marie)	Nominated	
2013	AEBN VOD Awards	Performer of the Year	—N/a	Won	
2013	Fame Registry Award	Most Popular Porn Star	—N/a	Won	
2013	Fame Registry Award	Porn Star Website of the Year	—N/a	Won	
2013	Ghanta Awards	Worst Breakthrough	Jism 2	Won	
2016	Ghanta Awards	Worst Actress	Ek Paheli Leela	Nominated	
2016	Ghanta Awards	Worst Actress	Kuch Kuch Locha Hai	Nominated	
2018	AVN Awards	Hall of Fame	—N/a	Won	
2023	Pinkvilla Style Icons Awards	Super Stylish Haute Stepper	—N/a	Won	
2023	Bollywood Hungama Style Icons	Most Stylish Glam Star	—N/a	Won	
