= Asees Kaur =

Indian singer (born 1988)

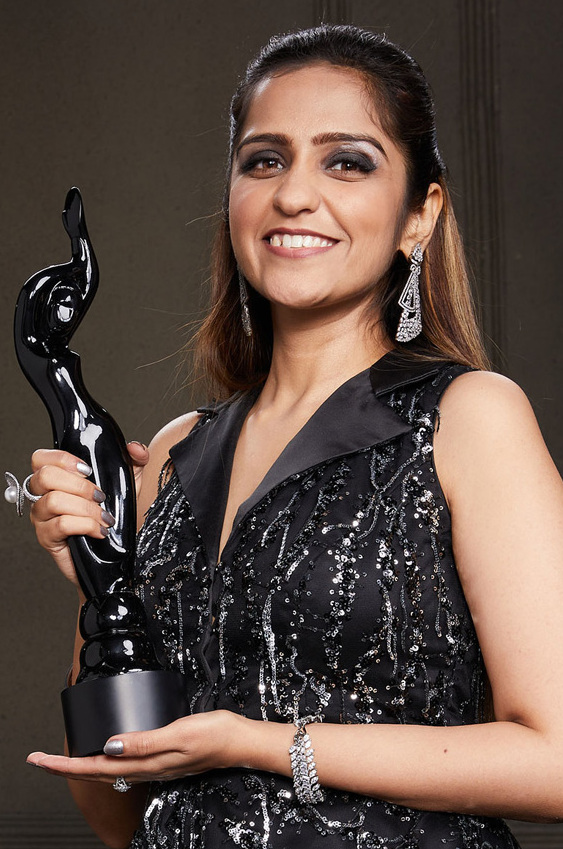
- Kaur at 66th Filmfare Awards

Background information
- Born: 26 September 1988 (age 38); Panipat, Haryana, India
- Genre: Bollywood
- Occupation: Playback singer
- Instrument: Vocals
- Years active: 2015–present
- Labels: Sony Music; T-Series; Zee Music
- Spouse: Goldie Sohel (m. 2023)

Asees Kaur (born 26 September 1988) is an Indian playback singer. She has participated in various singing reality shows including Indian Idol (season 6) and Awaz Punjab Di She has won many awards including 2 Filmfare Awards and an IIFA Award

She made her Bollywood debut with "Dildara Reprise" from Tamanchey (2014). She has worked on Bollywood songs including "Ve Maahi" from Kesari, "Makhna" from Drive, "Bandeya Re Bandeya" & "Tere Bin" from Simmba, "Akh Lad Jave" and "Chogada" from Loveyatri and "Bolna" from Kapoor & Sons.

== Early life ==
Asees Kaur was born and brought up in Panipat, Haryana Kaur attended Bal Vikas School in Panipat and later completed a Master of Commerce degree from S. D. (P.G.) College, Panipat. She developed an interest in singing at a young age and decided to pursue it professionally. Her first musical performance was singing Shabads at a local Gurdwara.She received classical music training under Ustad Puran Shahkoti in Jalandhar She began performing Gurbani recitations at various events, often accompanied by her siblings. She auditioned in Indian Idol Season 6 in 2012, but could not go beyond Round 3, Later while appearing the 75th episode of Indian Idol she recalled, "I was eliminated from Indian Idol Season 6, but that one rejection only pushed me to dream bigger. I went back to my riyaaz, and three years later, I got my first Bollywood break.” Kaur later participated in the Punjabi reality show Awaz Punjab Di.

== Career ==
Asees is known for the song "Ve Maahi" which received widespread attention and appeared on year-end lists. Her singles "Gal Karke" with Desi Music Factory, "Kisi Aur Naal" with VYRL Originals, a subsidiary of Universal Music India and "Mujhe Jeene De" with Panoctave India.

In September 2021, Kaur along with Renuka Panwar were featured at Times Square in New York City for their song "52 Gaj Ka Daman". In 2026, she released a non-film album, Nitnem, consisting of Banis, traditional Sikh prayers. She also appeared in the 75th episode of Indian Idol for the Diamond Jubilee celebration, along with other former contestants.

== Personal life ==
On 18 June 2023, she married Punjabi music composer Goldie Sohel in Mumbai at a Gurudwara. On World Music Day in 2024, she welcomed her first child.

== Discography ==
=== Film songs ===
| Denotes films that have not yet been released |

| Year | Film | Song | Music | Lyrics | Co-singer(s) | Note |
|---|---|---|---|---|---|---|
| 2015 | Ishqedarriyaan | "Mohabbat Yeh" (Reprise Version) | Bilal Saeed, Bloodline | Bilal Saeed | | |
| 2015 | Jazbaa | "Bandeyaa" (Reprise) | Amjad-Nadeem | Sanjay Gupta | | |
| 2015 | Kuch Kuch Locha Hai | "Na Jaane Kya Tumse Wasta" | Amjad-Nadeem | Sanjeev Chaturvedi | Jubin Nautiyal | |
| 2016 | Udta Punjab | "Ikk Kudi" (Asees Kaur Version) | Amit Trivedi | Shiv Kumar Batalvi | | |
| 2016 | A Flying Jatt | Bhangda Pa | Sachin–Jigar | Mayur Puri | Vishal Dadlani, Divya Kumar | |
| 2016 | Kapoor & Sons | "Bolna" | Tanishk Bagchi | Dr. Devender Kafir | Arijit Singh | |
| 2016 | Beiimaan Love | "Rang Reza" (Female) | Asad Khan | Raqueeb Alam | | |
| 2017 | Mirza Juuliet | "Tukda Tukda" | Krsna Solo | Sandeep Nath | | |
| 2017 | Behen Hogi Teri | "Tenu Na Bol Pawaan" (Reprise) | Amjad-Nadeem | Rohit Sharma | | |
| 2017 | Munna Michael | "Beat It Bijuriya" | Tanishk Bagchi | Vayu | Renesa Baagchi | |
| 2017 | Half Girlfriend | "Baarish" (Asees Kaur Version) | Tanishk Bagchi | Arafat Mehmood, Tanishk Bagchi | | Not included in the album; released separately |
| 2017 | Dobaara: See Your Evil | "Kaari Kaari" | Arko | | | |
| 2017 | Shaadi Mein Zaroor Aana | "Tu Banja Gali Benaras Ki" (Asees Kaur Version) | Rashid Khan | Shakeel Azmi | | |
| 2018 | Aiyaary | "Lae Dooba" (Version 2) | Rochak Kohli | Manoj Muntashir | | |
| 2018 | Piya Re | "Piya Re" (Female) | Jeet Gannguli | Priyo Chattopadhay | | Bengali |
| 2018 | High Jack | "Prabhu Ji" | Anurag Saikia | Akarsh Khurana | | |
| 2018 | Loveyatri | Chogada | Lijo George – DJ Chetas | Darshan Raval, Shabbir Ahmed | Darshan Raval | |
| 2018 | Loveyatri | Akh Lad Jaave | Tanishk Bagchi | Tanishk Bagchi, Badshah | Jubin Nautiyal, Badshah | |
| 2018 | Loveyatri | Tera Hua (Unplugged) | Tanishk Bagchi | Manoj Muntashir | Atif Aslam | |
| 2018 | Bhaiaji Superhit | "Sleepy Sleepy Akhiyan" | Jeet Gannguli | Kumaar | Yasser Desai | |
| 2018 | Marudhar Express | Mirza Ve (Female) | Jeet Gannguli | Manoj Muntashir | | |
| 2018 | Kedarnath | Jaan Nisaar (Version 2) | Amit Trivedi | Amitabh Bhattacharya | | |
| 2018 | Simmba | Tere Bin (Remake) | Tanishk Bagchi | Rashmi Virag | Rahat Fateh Ali Khan | Original composition by Nusrat Fateh Ali Khan |
| 2018 | Simmba | Bandeya Re Bandeya | Tanishk Bagchi | Rashmi Virag | Arijit Singh | |
| 2019 | Notebook | Nai Lagda | Vishal Mishra | Akshay Tripathi | Vishal Mishra | |
| 2019 | Gone Kesh | Bibi | Kanish Sharma | Dr. Devender Kafir | Shahid Mallya | |
| 2019 | Kesari | Ve Maahi | Tanishk Bagchi | | Arijit Singh | |
| 2019 | Article 15 | Intezari (Asees Kaur Version) | Anurag Saikia | Shakeel Azmi | | |
| 2019 | Drive | Makhna | Tanishk Bagchi | Ozil Dalal, Tanishk Bagchi | Yasser Desai, Tanishk Bagchi | Netflix film |
| 2019 | Bala | Pyaar Toh Tha | Sachin–Jigar | Priya Saraiya | Jubin Nautiyal | |
| 2019 | Pagalpanti | Bimar Dil | Tanishk Bagchi | Shabbir Ahmed | Jubin Nautiyal | |
| 2019 | Pati, Patni Aur Woh | Ankhiyon Se Goli Maare Returns | Lijo George – DJ Chetas | Shabbir Ahmed | Dev Negi | |
| 2019 | Good Newwz | Chandigarh Mein | Tanishk Bagchi | Tanishk Bagchi, Badshah | Badshah, Harrdy Sandhu, Lisa Mishra | |
| 2020 | Panga | Dil Ne Kaha | Shankar–Ehsaan–Loy | Javed Akhtar | Shahid Mallya | |
| 2020 | Panga | Dil Ne Kaha (Reprise) | Shankar–Ehsaan–Loy | Javed Akhtar | Jassi Gill | |
| 2020 | Panga | Wahi Hain Raste | Shankar–Ehsaan–Loy | Javed Akhtar | Mohan Kanan | |
| 2020 | Happy Hardy and Heer | Aadat | Himesh Reshammiya | Shabbir Ahmed | Himesh Reshammiya, Rabbi Shergill, Ranu Mondal | |
| 2020 | Happy Hardy and Heer | Ishqbaaziyaan | Himesh Reshammiya | Sonia Kapoor | Jubin Nautiyal, Harshdeep Kaur, Alamgir Khan | |
| 2020 | Happy Hardy and Heer | Le Jaana | Himesh Reshammiya | Kumaar | Himesh Reshammiya, Navraj Hans, Harshdeep Kaur | |
| 2020 | Malang | Hui Malang | Ved Sharma | Kunaal Vermaa, Haarsh Limbachiyaa | | Filmfare Award for Best Female Playback Singer – Winner |
| 2020 | Khuda Haafiz | Jaan Ban Gaye | Mithoon | | Vishal Mishra, Mithoon | Disney Plus Hotstar film |
| 2020 | Khuda Haafiz | Jaan Ban Gaye (Reprise) | Mithoon | | | Disney Plus Hotstar film |
| 2020 | Chhalaang | Deedar De | Vishal–Shekhar | Panchhi Jalonvi | Dev Negi | Amazon Prime Video film |
| 2020 | Indoo Ki Jawani | Hasina Pagal Deewani | Mika Singh | Shabbir Ahmed | | |
| 2021 | Roohi | Panghat | Sachin–Jigar | Amitabh Bhattacharya | Divya Kumar, Sachin–Jigar | |
| 2021 | Shershaah | Raataan Lambiyan | Tanisk Bagchi | | Jubin Nautiyal | Amazon Prime Video film Filmfare Award for Best Female Playback Singer – Winner |
| 2021 | Bell Bottom | Marjaawaan | Gurnazar | | | |
| 2021 | Haseen Dilruba | Lakireen | Amit Trivedi | Sidhant Mago | Devendra Pal Singh | Netflix film |
| 2021 | Qismat 2 | Paagla | B Praak | Jaani | | Punjabi film |
| 2021 | Hum Do Hamare Do | Bansuri | Sachin–Jigar | Shelle | | Disney Plus Hotstar film |
| 2021 | Tadap | Tere Siva Jag Mein (Reprise) | Pritam | Irshad Kamil, Sholke Laal | Mohammed Irfan | |
| 2021 | Velle | Yaaron Ka Bulaava | Rochak Kohli | Vayu | Armaan Malik | |
| 2022 | Janhit Mein Jaari | "Chali Re Bazaar" | Sadhu Sushil Tiwari | Niket Pandey, Sadhu Sushil Tiwari | | |
| 2022 | Jugjugg Jeeyo | "Nain Ta Heere" | Vishal Shelke | Kumaar, Ghulam Mohd. Khavar | Guru Randhawa | |
| 2022 | Khuda Haafiz 2 | "Chaiyaan Mein Saiyaan Ki" | Mithoon | Mithoon, Faruk Kabir | Jubin Nautiyal, Keshav Anand | |
| 2022 | Khuda Haafiz 2 | "Rubaru" | Vishal Mishra | Manoj Muntashir | Vishal Mishra, Niazi Nizami Brothers | |
| 2022 | Babli Bouncer | "Mad Banke" | Tanishk Bagchi | Shabbir Ahmed | Romy | Disney Plus Hotstar film |
| 2022 | Maja Ma | "Kacchi Doriyaan" | Anurag Sharma | | Arijit Singh | Amazon Prime Video film |
| 2023 | Sirf Ek Bandaa Kaafi Hai | "Sahara Mera" | Sangeet-Siddharth | Garima Obrah | Sangeet-Siddharth | Zee5 film |
| 2023 | Rocky Aur Rani Kii Prem Kahaani | "Ve Kamleya (Sufi Version)" | Pritam | Amitabh Bhattacharya | Shadab Faridi, Altamash Faridi | |
| 2023 | Rocky Aur Rani Kii Prem Kahaani | "Ve Kamleya (Reprise)" | Pritam | Amitabh Bhattacharya | | |
| 2023 | Gadar 2 | "Tuk Tuk Tenu" | Monty Sharma | Sunil Sirvaiya | | |
| 2023 | Gadar 2 | "Babul" | Monty Sharma | Sunil Sirvaiya | | |
| 2023 | Bad Boy | "Insta Vich Story" | Himesh Reshammiya | Kumaar | Himesh Reshammiya, Aditi Singh Sharma | |
| 2023 | Bad Boy | "Saajnaa" | Himesh Reshammiya | Shabbir Ahmed | | |
| 2023 | Fukrey 3 | "Ve Fukrey" | Tanishk Bagchi | Shabbir Ahmed | Dev Negi, Romy | |
| 2023 | Aankh Micholi | "Kaleja Kad Ke" | Sachin-Jigar | Jigar Saraiya | | |
| 2024 | Teri Baaton Mein Aisa Uljha Jiya | "Teri Baaton Mein Aisa Uljha Jiya (Title Track)" | Tanishk Bagchi, Raghav | Tanishk Bagchi | Raghav | |
| 2024 | Murder Mubarak | "Killer Killer" | Sachin-Jigar | Priya Saraiya | Raghav | Netflix film |
| 2024 | Crew | "Darbadar" | Akshay-IP | IP Singh | B Praak | |
| 2024 | Ishq Vishk Rebound | "Chot Dil Pe Lagi" | Rochak Kohli | Gurpreet Saini | Varun Jain | |
| 2024 | Kahan Shuru Kahan Khatam | "Rang Udaye" | Sandeep Shirodkar | Kumaar | Varun Jain | |
| 2025 | Fateh | "Heer" | Shabbir Ahmed | Shabbir Ahmed, Ajay Pal Sharma | Vishal Mishra | |
| 2025 | Sunny Sanskari Ki Tulsi Kumari | "Bijuria" | Tanishk Bagchi, Ravi Pawar | Sonu Nigam, Tanishk Bagchi, Ajay Jhingran | Sonu Nigam | |
| 2025 | Andaaz 2 | "Rabba Ishq Na Hove 2.0" | Nadeem Saifi | Sameer Anjaan | Palak Muchhal, Shadab Faridi | |
| 2026 | Ikkis | "Sajda" | White Noise Collectives | Amitabh Bhattacharya | Vishal Mishra | |
| 2026 | Hai Jawani Toh Ishq Hona Hai | "Vyah Karwado Ji" | White Noise Collectives | Vayu Shrivastav | Mika Singh | |
| 2026 | Hai Jawani Toh Ishq Hona Hai | "Chunnari Chunnari - Let's Go" | Akshay–IP, Anu Malik | Sameer Anjaan, IP Singh | IP Singh, Jonita Gandhi, Sudhir Yaduvanshi, Anuradha Sriram | |

=== Non-film songs ===
| Denotes songs that have not yet been released |

| Year | Album/Single | Song | Co-singer(s) | Music | Lyrics | Note |
|---|---|---|---|---|---|---|
| TBA | | "Wadi Teri Wadeyai" | | | | |
| TBA | | "Kar Kirpa Meloh Ram" | | | | |
| TBA | | "Sakhiyo Saheladio" | | | | |
| 2011 | Daata Oh Na Mangiye | "Daata Oh Na Mangiye" | Deedar Kaur | Master Saleem | | |
| 2014 | Tamanchey | "Dildara Reprise" | Arko | | | Not included in the album; released separately; Bollywood debut |
| 2016 | Ishqedarriyaan | "Judaa (Asees Kaur Version)" | | Jaidev Kumar | Kumaar | Not included in the respective albums; released separately |
| 2016 | Holiday | "Ashq Na Ho (Asees Kaur Version)" | | Pritam | Irshad Kamil | Not included in the respective albums; released separately |
| 2016 | ABCD 2 | "Chunar (Asees Kaur Version)" | | Sachin–Jigar | Mayur Puri | Not included in the respective albums; released separately |
| 2016 | Tu Jo Paas Mere – Duet | "Tu Jo Paas Mere – Duet" | Krsna Solo | | | |
| 2016 | Yaara Ve | "Yaara Ve" | | Krsna Solo | Raj Shekhar | |
| 2017 | Khaab | "Khaab (Cover)" | | Akhil, Bob | Raja | Original song by Akhil |
| 2017 | Agar Tum Saath Ho | "Main Kamli Ho" | TBA | | | on Zindagi |
| 2019 | Gal Karke | "Gal Karke" | | Rajat Nagpal | Babbu Maan | Female version |
| 2019 | Tujhe Kaise, Pata Na Chala | "Tujhe Kaise, Pata Na Chala" | Meet Bros | | Kumaar | Featuring Ritika Badiani |
| 2019 | Choodiyan | "Choodiyan" | Dev Negi | Tanishk Bagchi | Shabbir Ahmed | Featuring Jackky Bhagnani and Dytto |
| 2019 | Kisi Aur Naal | "Kisi Aur Naal" | | Goldie Sohel | Goldie Sohel, Kunaal Vermaa | Featuring Awez Darbar and Nagma Mirajkar |
| 2019 | Naino Tale | "Naino Tale" | Shivang Mathur | | Shayra Apoorva | Featuring Jannat Zubair Rahmani and Manish Tyagi |
| 2019 | Intezaar | "Intezaar" | Arijit Singh | Mithoon | | |
| 2020 | Baat Nahi Karni | "Baat Nahi Karni" | Goldie Sohel | | | |
| 2020 | Viah Nai Karauna | "Viah Nai Karauna" | | Rajat Nagpal | Babbu | Featuring Dheeraj Dhoopar and Shraddha Arya |
| 2020 | Wanga Kaaliyan | "Wanga Kaaliyan" | | Sunnyvik | Raj Fatehpur | |
| 2020 | Saari Ki Saari 2.0 | "Saari Ki Saari 2.0" | Darshan Raval | | | |
| 2020 | Pachtaoge (Female Version) | "Pachtaoge" (Female Version) | | B Praak | Jaani | Featuring Nora Fatehi |
| 2020 | Mujhe Jeene De | "Mujhe Jeene De" | | Krsna Solo | | |
| 2020 | Tu Lagdi Ferrari | "Tu Lagdi Ferrari" | Romy | Tanishk Bagchi | | Featuring Arradhya Mann and Amy Aela |
| 2020 | Yaarian | "Yaarian" | Jass Manak | Jass Manak, Rajat Nagpal | Jass Manak | |
| 2021 | Goli Maar De | "Goli Maar De" | | Rajat Nagpal | Vicky Sandhu | Featuring Nita Shilimkar and Rohit Zinjurke |
| 2021 | Pani Di Gal | "Pani Di Gal" | Maninder Buttar | | | Featuring Jasmin Bhasin |
| 2021 | Galat | "Galat" | | Sunnyvik | Raj Fatehpur | Featuring Rubina Dilaik and Paras Chhabra |
| 2021 | Madhanya | "Madhanya" | Rahul Vaidya | Lijo George and DJ Chetas | Kumaar | Featuring Disha Parmar |
| 2021 | Aaya Jado Da | "Aaya Jado Da" | | Abhijit Vaghani | Nirmaan | Featuring Aparshakti Khurana and Parul Gulati |
| 2021 | Meri Pukaar Suno | "Meri Pukaar Suno" | Shreya Ghoshal, K.S. Chithra, Alka Yagnik, Sadhana Sargam, Shashaa Tirupati, Armaan Malik | A.R. Rahman | Gulzar | |
| 2021 | 52 Gaj Ka Daman | "52 Gaj Ka Daman" | Renuka Panwar | Aman Jaji and Mukesh Jaji | Shloke Lal | Hindi version of original Haryanvi song "52 Gaj Ka Daman" |
| 2021 | Disco Balma | "Disco Balma" | Mellow D | Sachin–Jigar | IP Singh | Featuring Mouni Roy |
| 2021 | Tera Hona Aaya | "Tera Hona Aaya" | Rochak Kohli | Rochak Kohli | Gurpreet Saini, Gautam Govind Sharma | |
| 2021 | Makhna (Drive) | "Makhna Dance Mix" (Remix by Emenes) | Tanishk Bagchi, Yasser Desai | Tanishk Bagchi | Ozil Dalal, Tanishk Bagchi | |
| 2021 | Pardesi | "Pardesi" | Arko Pravo Mukherjee | | | Featuring Sunny Leone |
| 2021 | Apsraa | "Apsraa" | Jaani | | | |
| 2022 | Babul Da Vehda | "Babul Da Vehda" | | Meet Bros | Kumaar | Featuring Divyanka Tripathi |
| 2022 | Ik Mili Mainu Apsraa | "Ik Mili Mainu Apsraa" | B Praak | | Jaani | Featuring Sandeepa Dhar |
| 2022 | Kashmiri Apple | "Kashmiri Apple" | | Harmony | Youngveer | Featuring Paras Chhbra and Mahira Sharma |
| 2022 | Mashooka | "Mashooka" | Dev Negi | Tanishk Bagchi | Ullumanati, Yash Narvekar | Featuring Rakul Preet Singh; Hindi song |
| 2022 | Mashooka | "Mashooka" | Aditya Iyengar | Tanishk Bagchi | Ramajogayya Sastry | Featuring Rakul Preet Singh; Telugu song |
| 2022 | Mashooka | "Mashooka" | Aditya Iyengar | Tanishk Bagchi | Madhan Karky | Featuring Rakul Preet Singh; Tamil song |
| 2022 | Kesariyo Rang | "Kesariyo Rang" | Dev Negi | Lijo George, DJ Chetas | Kumaar | Featuring Avneet Kaur and Shantanu Maheshwari |
| 2022 | Kaali Car | ''Kaali Car'' | Raftaar | White Hill Beats | Happy Raikoti | Featuring herself, Amyra Dastur and Raftaar |

== Accolades ==
| Year | Award | Song | Film | Title | Result | Ref. |
|---|---|---|---|---|---|---|
| 2016 | Mirchi Music Awards | "Bolna" | Kapoor & Sons | Upcoming Female Vocalist of The Year | Won | |
| 2016 | Mirchi Music Awards | "Rang Reza" | Beiimaan Love | Upcoming Female Vocalist of The Year | Nominated | |
| 2021 | 66th Filmfare Awards | "Hui Malang" | Malang | Best Female Playback Singer | Won | |
| 2022 | IIFA Awards | "Raatan Lambiyan" | Shershaah | Best Female Playback Singer | Won | |
| 2022 | 67th Filmfare Awards | "Raatan Lambiyan" | Shershaah | Best Female Playback Singer | Won | |
