= Jism =

Jism may refer to:

- a slang word for semen
- an Arabic (جسم), Hindi (जिस्म), and Urdu (جسم) word for "body"
- Jism (2003 film), a Bollywood erotic thriller film
- Jism 2, a 2012 erotic thriller and sequel to the 2003 Bollywood film
- Jism (2006 film), a Pakistani film
- Jism (2016 film), a Nepali film
- "Jism", a song by the rock band Tindersticks from their self-titled debut album
