= Jism (2016 film) =

2016 Nepali film

- Directed by: Raju Giri
- Starring: Archana Paneru; Surendra Budhathoki
- Music by: Yogesh Kaji
- Release date: 15 July 2016
- Running time: 101 minutes
- Country: Nepal
- Language: Nepali

Jism is a 2016 Nepalese romantic drama film directed by Raju Giri. The lead roles are played by Nepalese teenage actress Archana Paneru, who aspires to a career as a porn star, and Surendra Budhathoki; it was the first film role for both.

== Plot ==
Surendra Budhathoki meets Archana Paneru and they fall in love. A lot of negative things happen that make the relationship seem like a disaster, but in the end they are still together.

== Cast ==
- Surendra Budhathoki
- Archana Paneru as Model
- Subhekshya Thapa

== Songs ==
- Dubideu Timi - 4:43

== Production ==
During shooting a location crew of nine people including Giri and Paneru were arrested for filming without a required permit from the Film Development Board-Nepal.

Jism was the debut film for both Budhathoki and Paneru; it was titled after Jism 2, the first Bollywood film of Paneru's idol, Sunny Leone. However, her second film, Chhesko, was released first. Giri and Paneru were on less good terms by post-production of Jism and she did not participate in either dubbing or promotion.
