= VoxWeb =

Indian social media app featuring voice-augmented photos

Voxweb
- Company type: Private
- Website type: Social Networking (Image Sharing)
- Founded: 2015
- Founder: Yash Mishra
- Industry: Internet
- Website: voxweb.rocks

VoxWeb is a special purpose messaging and social networking application developed around speaking pictures or "voxies". In addition to mainstream online communication usage, users can augment their photos by adding a voice caption of up to 11 seconds in lieu of a text caption. A voice-augmented photo or a voxie is depicted as an image underlined by an orange line which speaks upon tapping the picture.

== History ==
The application was designed by IIT Kanpur graduate Yash Mishra and was rolled out on iOS and Android operating systems. VoxWeb's iOS and Android apps along with the backend for the communication platform were developed using $100,000 of money put in by company promoters. The first capital infusion took place in November 2015 when a group of individual investors invested $350,000 in the company.

Users and celebs have used speaking pictures to capture moments as voice augmented photographs are able to capture both atmosphere of the picture and the emotions of the photographer. The trend was amplified in January 2016 when Quantico star Priyanka Chopra used a voxie to thank her fans after winning the People's Choice Awards. Subsequently, many other celebrities, including Amitabh Bachchan and Sunny Leone followed the suit and took to the platform to send speaking messages.

== Product ==
Speaking pictures, or Voxies, allows users to add an 11-second voice clip to pictures, and share it through various social platforms. In order to play the speaking picture, a user is required to download the VoxWeb app. It also has a social media portal called Life, where any user can access or upload speaking pictures. This app is available on both Android and iOS platforms for free. In June 2016, it introduced a feature called "P-mode" that allows users to listen to a message privately.
