= From Sydney with Love =

- Directed by: Prateek Chakravorty
- Screenplay by: Prateek Chakravorty
- Produced by: Prateek Chakravorty
- Starring: Sharad Malhotra; Bidita Bag; Karan Sagoo; Evelyn Sharma
- Cinematography: Piyush Shah
- Music by: Sohail Sen
- Release date: 31 August 2012
- Country: India
- Language: Hindi

From Sydney with Love is a Hindi movie directed by Prateek Chakravorty, starring Sharad Malhotra, Bidita Bag, Karan Sagoo and Evelyn Sharma. The music has been composed by Sohail Sen, Thor Partridge, and Nabin Laskar.

== Plot ==
It was a dream come true for Meghaa Banerjee, a small town girl in West Bengal, India, when she earned a scholarship from the prestigious University of New South Wales in Australia to pursue her master's degree in economics with inevitable butterflies in her stomach. She embarks upon her maiden expedition to Sydney leaving her protective shell and family behind. Coming from a conservative middle-class background, life and culture in Sydney was an instant eye opener for her. Under the guidance of her caring cousin Kalpana, fondly called "Kol," Meghaa slowly embraces her new life in Sydney where she makes new set of friends, which includes cherubic Lubaina, prankster Raj, and narcissistic Suhail. Love and romance was something that was strictly not in her agenda of things. However being young at heart it was just something waiting to happen to her when she met Rohit - a charismatic, full of sheen and friendly natured fellow student in the University with whom she starts gelling right from the beginning.

== Cast ==
- Sharad Malhotra as Rohit Khurana
- Bidita Bag as Meghaa Banerjee
- Prateek Chakravorty as Raj Bakshi
- Evelyn Sharma as Lubaina Snyder
- Sabyasachi Chakrabarty as Prof. Banerjee
- Karan Sagoo as Suhail Syed
- Reshmi Ghosh as Kalpana Chatterjee

== Soundtrack ==
The music of the film was composed by Sohail Sen. Soundtrack includes Naino Ne Naino Se, sung by Palak Muchhal and Sohail Sen.

All lyrics are written by Anvita Dutt Guptan.

No.	Title	Singer(s)	Length
1.	"Feeling Love in Sydney"	Sohail Sen	3:30
2.	"Ho Jaayega"	Mohit Chauhan, Monali Thakur	4:48
3.	"Khatkaa Khatkaa"	Mika Singh	3:41
4.	"Naino Ne"	Palak Muchhal, Mohammad Salamat	4:44
5.	"Item Ye Hi Fi"	Neeraj Shridhar	3:06
6.	"Ho Jaayega"	Mohit Chauhan, Monali Thakur	4:49
7.	"Feeling Love in Sydney" (Remix)	Sohail Sen	3:00
8.	"Pyaari Pyaari" (Remix)	Sohail Sen, Brooklyn Shanti	3:54
