= Kissebaaz =

2019 Indian Hindi-language mystery film

- Theatrical poster
- Directed by: Annant Jaaitpaal
- Screenplay by: Shekhar Ramesh Mishra
- Story by: Shekhar Ramesh Mishra
- Produced by: Divya Anand; Sanjay Anand; Nishant Pawar
- Starring: Pankaj Tripathi; Evelyn Sharma
- Cinematography: Uttam Dhakal
- Edited by: Mukesh Thakur
- Music by: Rohan-Rohan score Ankur Walia
- Production company: Experion Moviez
- Distributed by: PVR Pictures
- Release date: 14 June 2019
- Running time: 123 minutes
- Country: India
- Language: Hindi

Kissebaaz (transl. Storyteller) is a 2019 Indian Hindi-language mystery film written by Shekhar Ramesh Mishra, directed by Annant Jaaitpaal, and produced by Sanjay Anand, Divya Anand and Nishant Pawar under Experion Moviez. The film, starring Pankaj Tripathi, Anupriya Goenka and Evelyn Sharma, is set in Varanasi and narrates the story of a man (played by Rahul Bagga) who is victim of a plot of a wily narrator. The soundtrack was released under the banner Zee Music Company. It was theatrically released in India on 14 June 2019.

== Cast ==
- Pankaj Tripathi as Chuttan Shukla
- Evelyn Sharma as Bindass Babli
- Anupriya Goenka as Naina
- Rahul Bagga as Harsh
- Mouli Ganguly as inspector madam
- Zakir Hussain as Kripa Shankar Pandey
- Rajesh Sharma as D. D Shukla
- Pankaj Berry as Harsh Father
- Vikas Shrivastav as Inspector Rajender Jha
- Vinita Mahesh as Amrita
- Jyoti Joshi as Naina’s Mother
- Rahaao as Shiv Pandey

== Marketing and release ==
The first look poster of the film and official trailer were released in May 2019, and the film was released on 14 June 2019.

== Reception ==
=== Critical response ===
Pallabi Dey Purkayastha of The Times of India giving the film one and half stars out of five, finds the script 'haphazard' and says, "Director Annant Jaaitpaal's political drama-turned-revenge saga is one long and painful movie about passionate love and the repercussions of it; cliche and boring."

== Soundtrack ==
Kissebaaz

Soundtrack album by Rohan Rohan
- Released: 4 June 2019
- Recorded: 2018–2019
- Studio: Audio Garage Studios
- Genre: Feature film soundtrack
- Length: 18:55
- Language: Hindi
- Label: Zee Music Company
- Producer: Nishadh Chandra
External audio
- Audio Jukebox on YouTube

The music of the film was composed by Rohan Rohan with lyrics by Rohan Gokhale.

Track listing
No.	Title	Singer(s)	Length
1.	"Babli"	Mamta Sharma, Rohan Pradhan	3:37
2.	"Sweety Baby"	Divya Kumar	4:13
3.	"Teri Parchaayiaan"	Neeti Mohan, Rohan Pradhan	5:04
4.	"Thiraktein"	Kailash Kher	3:45
5.	"Teri Parchaayiaan (unplugged)"	Rohan Gokhale	2:16
Total length:			18:55
