= Trimukha =

Indian Telugu-language thriller film

- Promotional poster
- Directed by: Razesh Naidu
- Written by: Razesh Naidu
- Produced by: Sridevi Maddali; Ramesh Maddali
- Starring: Sunny Leone; Yogesh Kalle
- Cinematography: Konga Srinivas
- Edited by: RK; Akhil Balaram
- Music by: Vinod Yajamanya
- Production company: Akhira Dream Creations
- Release date: 30 January 2026
- Country: India
- Language: Telugu

Trimukha is a 2026 Indian Telugu-language thriller film written and directed by Razesh Naidu. It is produced by Sridevi Maddali and Ramesh Maddali under the banner Akhira Dream Creations. The film stars Sunny Leone and debutant Yogesh Kalle in lead roles, alongside Akriti Agarwal, Aditya Srivastav, Rajendran, Suman, and others.

== Cast ==
- Sunny Leone
- Yogesh Kalle
- Akriti Agarwal
- Aditya Srivastav
- Praveen
- Rajendran
- Suman
- Ashu Reddy
- Shakalaka Shankar

== Production ==
Trimukha marks the acting debut of Yogesh Kalle. Principal photography began in early 2025 and wrapped up in September 2025.

== Music ==
The film features music by Vinod Yajamanya. A special song titled "Gippa Gippa", featuring Sunny Leone and Akriti Agarwal, was filmed as part of the project.

== Release ==
Earlier reports suggested a March 2025 release, but subsequent updates confirmed that the film’s post-production extended into late 2025. The film was finally released theatrically on 30 January 2026.

== Reception ==
Trimukha received mixed to positive reviews from critics and audiences upon its release.

Sakshi Post noted that the film’s murder mystery premise and suspense elements were engaging, but felt that the screenplay and pacing were uneven in parts. The review appreciated the performances of Sunny Leone and Yogesh Kalle, while observing that the narrative could have been more tightly executed.

The Hans India described Trimukha as an ambitious crime thriller that attempts to blend investigation with layered storytelling. While praising the film’s concept and intent, the review pointed out that the complex screenplay and multiple narrative threads may confuse sections of the audience, particularly in the second half.

According to News18 Telugu, the film received a strong response from audiences, with positive word-of-mouth and encouraging theatre turnout. The report highlighted audience appreciation for the suspense, twists, and overall engaging nature of the film.
