= Evelyn Sharma =

German model and actress

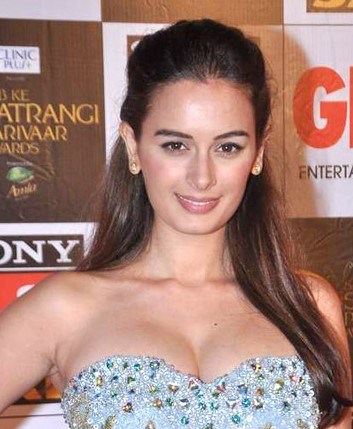
- Sharma in 2014
- Born: Aschaffenburg, Bavaria, Germany
- Occupations: Actress; model
- Years active: 2004–2019
- Spouse: Tushaan Bhindi (m. 2021; div. 2026)
- Children: 2

Evelyn Lakshmi Sharma is a German actress and model who appears primarily in Indian films of the Hindi language. She marked her film debut with the 2006 American film Turn Left and made her Bollywood debut in the 2012 film From Sydney with Love. She gained prominence following her appearance in the 2013 film Yeh Jawaani Hai Deewani.

== Early life and background ==
Evelyn Lakshmi Sharma was born and raised in Aschaffenburg, Bavaria, Germany, to an Indian Punjabi Hindu father and a German mother. She holds German citizenship.

== Career ==
Sharma began her acting career with a bit part in the 2006 American film Turn Left. In 2012, she made her Bollywood debut playing Lubaina Snyder in the film From Sydney with Love. The following year, she was featured in the film Yeh Jawaani Hai Deewani, and her performance was praised in Nautanki Saala! and Issaq. In 2014, she played the role of Janet D'souza in the sleeper hit Yaariyan. In August 2014, Sharma released her first music single, "Something Beautiful", produced by Brooklyn Shanti. She has also hosted her own travel show titled Life Mein Ek Baar. In May 2015, she appeared in Devang Dholakia's Kuch Kuch Locha Hai opposite Navdeep Chabbra, Sunny Leone and Ram Kapoor and it was released on 8 May 2015. She was also featured in Ishqedarriyaan, which was released on 29 May 2015. She appeared in Saaho and Kissebaaz in the year 2019.

== Personal life ==
In October 2019, Sharma got engaged to an Indo-Australian dental surgeon and entrepreneur, Tushaan Bhindi. On 15 May 2021, she married Bhindi in Brisbane, Australia. Their first child, a daughter, was born that November. She shifted to Sydney following her marriage and departure from Bollywood.

In 2026, Sharma confirmed that she and Bhindi divorced after five years of marriage, but chose to co-parent their children.

== Filmography ==
Key
†	Denotes films that have not yet been released

Year	Film	Role	Language	Notes
2006	Turn Left	Snobby Girl	English	Hollywood debut
2012	From Sydney with Love	Lubaina Snyder	Hindi	Bollywood debut
2013	Nautanki Saala!	Sita Devi	Hindi	
2013	Yeh Jawaani Hai Deewani	Lara	Hindi	
2013	Issaq	Rosaline	Hindi	
2014	Yaariyan	Janet D'Souza	Hindi	
2014	Main Tera Hero	Veronica	Hindi	
2015	Kuch Kuch Locha Hai	Naina	Hindi	
2015	Ishqedarriyaan	Luvleen	Hindi	
2015	Gaddar: The Traitor		Punjabi	Special appearance
2017	Anni Pa De		Punjabi	Music video
2017	Hindi Medium		Hindi	
2017	Jab Harry Met Sejal	Irina	Hindi	Special appearance
2017	Party Non Stop		Hindi/English	Music Video
2018	Jack and Dil	Lara	Hindi	
2018	Bhaiaji Superhit	Stephanie	Hindi	
2019	Kissebaaz	Bindass Babli	Hindi	
2019	Saaho	Jennifer	Telugu/Hindi	Tollywood debut
2019	X Ray: The Inner Image	Herself	Hindi	Special appearance in song "Jigliya"
