= Tera Intezaar =

2017 Indian supernatural-romantic drama film by Raajeev Walia

- Directed by: Raajeev Walia
- Written by: Anwarullah Khan
- Screenplay by: Raajeev Walia
- Produced by: Aman Mehta; Bijal Mehta
- Starring: Sunny Leone; Arbaaz Khan
- Cinematography: Johny Lal
- Edited by: Raajeev Walia
- Music by: Raaj Aashoo
- Production companies: Bageshree Films
- Distributed by: Phantom India
- Release date: 1 December 2017
- Running time: 108 minutes
- Country: India
- Language: Hindi
- Box office: est. ₹9.5 million

Tera Intezaar (transl. Waiting for you) is a 2017 Indian supernatural-romantic drama film directed by Raajeev Walia. It is produced by Aman Mehta and Bijal Mehta. The movie turned out to be a disaster at the box office.

The film stars Arbaaz Khan and Sunny Leone in lead roles and was released on 1 December 2017.

== Plot ==
A successful exhibitionist falls in love with a gifted yet unheralded painter. Her life is in jeopardy when four of his clients want a painting from her lover, to which he does not agree. Her lover goes missing suddenly. She has to find her lover while those clients want that painting at any cost.

== Cast ==
- Arbaaz Khan as Veer Singh Rajput / Prince Singh Rajput (Twin brothers)
- Sunny Leone as Rounak
- Aarya Babbar as Vikram
- Hanif Noyda as Jijaji
- Salil Ankola as Chanakya
- Sudha Chandran as Black Magician Madam
- Richa Sharma
- Bhani Singh as Bobby (Antagonist)
- Gauahar Khan Dancer in Barbie song
- Sarita Joshi

== Production ==
=== Development ===
The official announcement of the film was made in the second half of May 2016. The title of the film was to be Tera Intezaar.

=== Casting ===
The makers of the film have chosen Arbaaz Khan and Sunny Leone to play the lead roles.

=== Filming ===
The principal photography of the film commenced in the second half of July 2016. The film will be shot in Mumbai. Some parts of the film will also be shot in Kutch as well as in international locations such as Mauritius. The first schedule of the film wrapped up on 23 August 2016. in ramaji rao studio Hyderabad. The choreographer for the film is Mudassar Khan.

Film Tera Intezaar completed a 15 days schedule in Mauritius starting from 8 to 24 November 2016.

== Mattel controversy ==
The Delhi High Court issued a notice to the producers of the film for using the word "Barbie" in a song without the permission of Mattel Inc, the manufacturers of the trademark Barbie dolls. The single judge bench of Justice Rajiv Sahai Endlaw, however, refused to grant ex-parte injunction against the toy company. The court also noted that the plea may be considered at the notice stage.

Mattel told the court in its plea that the song and its lyrics have been used "in a manner antagonistic to the values and interests of the customers target base, the plaintiffs cater to". The song, which features actor Sunny Leone, is "provocative and inappropriate for younger girls and children, tarnishing and degrading the distinctive quality of the Barbie", the company said.

Justice Endlaw noted that courts in the United States had held that music companies’ use of "Barbie" in a song was not an infringement of the toy manufacturer's trademark. Quoting from an older judgment passed by the United States Court of Appeals, Ninth Circuit from 2002, the judge said, "The parties are advised to chill.”

== Soundtrack ==
Tera Intezaar

Soundtrack album by Raaj Aashoo
- Released: 10 November 2017
- Genre: Feature film soundtrack
- Length: 34:25
- Language: Hindi
- Label: T-Series

Raaj Aashoo chronology
| Sweetiee Weds NRI (2017) | Tera Intezaar (2017) |
External audio
- Audio Jukebox on YouTube

Singles from Tera Intezaar
- 1. "Khali Khali Dil" Released: 26 October 2017; 2. "Barbie Girl" Released: 6 November 2017

The music of the film is composed by Raaj Aashoo, while the lyrics have been penned by Shabbir Ahmed. The first song of the film, titled "Khali Khali Dil" which is sung by Armaan Malik and Payal Dev, was released on 26 October 2017. The second track of the film to be released was "Barbie Girl" which is sung by Swati Sharma, Lil Golu, and Hritiqa Chhebe, andr was released on 6 November 2017. The soundtrack was released by T-Series on 11 November 2017.

All lyrics are written by Shabbir Ahmed; all music is composed by Raaj Aashoo.

Track listing
| No. | Title | Singer(s) | Length |
|---|---|---|---|
| 1. | "Intezaar" (Title Song) | Shreya Ghoshal | 5:22 |
| 2. | "Barbie Girl" | Swati Sharma, Lil Golu, Hritiqa Chheber | 3:35 |
| 3. | "Khali Khali Dil" | Armaan Malik, Payal Dev | 4:41 |
| 4. | "Mehfooz" | Yasser Desai | 4:43 |
| 5. | "Abhagi Piya Ki" | Kanika Kapoor, Ustad Ahmed Hussain, Mohammad Hussain, Raja Hasan | 4:39 |
| 6. | "Abhagi Piya Ki" (Version 2) | Javed Ali, Payal Dev | 4:08 |
| 7. | "Mehfooz" (Reprise) | Palak Muchhal | 2:34 |
| 8. | "Mehfooz" (Version 2) | Hrishikesh Chury | 4:43 |
| Total length: | | | 34:25 |

== Critical reception ==
Reza Noorani of The Times of India gave the film a rating of 1.5 out of 5, saying that, "With weak performances, forced VFX and a badly structured script, 'Tera Intezaar' is a film where you will be waiting desperately for the end credits to roll." Rohit Vats of Hindustan Times gave the film a rating of 0 out of 5 saying that, "From performing planchette to listening conversations via paintings, Tera Intezaar can entertain you at many levels." Prasanna D Zore of Rediff gave the film a rating of 0.5 out of 5 and said that, "There is nothing in Tera Intezaar to keep you hooked." Shubhra Gupta of The Indian Express gave the film a rating of 0 out of 5 and criticized the film, saying that, "Who made this film? Why was it made? Who was it made for? Is it even a film?" Namrata Joshi of The Hindu criticized the film saying that, "'Tera Intezaar' is the prime candidate for bagging "So Bad That It Is Too Good" award of 2017". Bollywood Hungama gave the film a rating of 1.5 out of 5 and said that, "Tera Intezaar has a jumbled plot line that lacks logic and fails to establish any connect. It neither succeeds in telling a supernatural story nor does it manage to act as a quintessential love story." Saibal Chatterjee of NDTV gave the film a rating of 0.5 out of 5 saying that, "You might ask: why does this film deserve even half a star? Well, it is for whoever it is who dared to believe that Tera Intezaar could be passed off as cinema. Takes loads of guts or a whole lot of stupidity!"
