= Arradhya Maan =

Indian actor

- Born: March 7, 2001 (age 25); Rajasthan, India
- Education: University of Rajasthan
- Occupations: Actor, Producer
- Years active: 2019-present
- Height: 5 ft 5 in (165 cm)
- Website: https://www.arradhyamaan.com/

Aaradhya Maheshwari, better known as Arradhya Maan, in an Indian actor and producer mostly known for his work in Bollywood films Ujda Chaman and Khuda Haafiz.

== Early life ==
Maan was born in Kota, Rajasthan, India.

== Career ==
=== Producer ===
Maan from his early age use to create videos on YouTube and film monologues.

Maan made his debut as a co-Producer with comedy-drama movie Ujda Chaman in 2019. Film focused on a rapidly growing social issue "pattern baldness". Following the success, Maan made his OTT debut with an action thriller Khuda Haafiz in 2020 on Disney+ Hotstar as an actor and an associate producer.

=== Musical career ===
Maan was last seen with Avneet kaur in a song 'Tera Hoon Na'. Maan is currently pairing up with Big boss 14 contestant Nikki Tamboli in an upcoming new music single.

== Films ==
Year	Film	Role	Banner
2019	Ujda Chaman	Co-Producer	Panorama Studios
2020	Khuda Haafiz	Associate Producer	Disney+ Hotstar
