= Kuch Kuch Locha Hai =

2015 film by Devang Dholakia

- Theatrical release poster
- Directed by: Devang Dholakia
- Written by: Devang Dholakia
- Produced by: Mukesh Purohit, K K Agarwal
- Starring: Sunny Leone; Ram Kapoor; Evelyn Sharma; Navdeep Chhabra; Suchita Trivedi
- Cinematography: Bhushan Mestry
- Edited by: Sanjay Ingle
- Music by: Arko; Ikka; Intense; Amjad-Nadeem: Gangadhar Jannapalli
- Production companies: Magic Picture and Entertainment; Maximus Multimedia Pvt Ltd.
- Distributed by: Alumbra Entertainment; Panorama Studios
- Release date: 8 May 2015
- Running time: 144 minutes
- Country: India
- Language: Hindi
- Budget: ₹150 million
- Box office: ₹32.6 million

Kuch Kuch Locha Hai (transl. Something is fishy), previously titled Patel Rap, is a 2015 Indian Hindi-language comedy film directed by Devang Dholakia and starring Sunny Leone, Ram Kapoor, Evelyn Sharma and Navdeep Chhabra in lead roles. The film is loosely inspired by the Gujarati comedy play Lage Raho Gujjubhai starring and directed by Siddharth Randeria. The film is presented by Magic Pictures and Entertainment Pvt Ltd. Asha Jhaveri is the associate producer of the film. The film marked the debut of actor Navdeep Chhabra. It was released on 8 May 2015. It received mostly negative reviews. The movie title can easily be confused with Kuch Kuch Hota Hai which was released in 1998.

== Plot ==
Praveen Patel (Ram Kapoor) is a 45-year-old Gujarati NRI store-owner living in Kuala Lumpur with his wife Kokila (Suchita Trivedi) and their ambitious 26-year-old son Jigar (Navdeep Chhabra). Although Praveen loves Kokila, he is often irritated by her deeply religious and domineering nature. He secretly has an enormous fascination with Bollywood actress Shanaya Khanna (Sunny Leone), avidly watching her films.

Jigar is in love with their neighbour Naina (Evelyn Sharma), an aspiring musician whom he wants to marry. Kokila, however, disapproves of Naina because she considers her "too modern" and wants a "traditional, homely Gujarati" daughter-in-law.

Shanaya travels from Mumbai to Kuala Lumpur as the "prize" in a Valentine's Day competition, with the winner receiving a date with her. Praveen enters determined to fulfil his lifelong fantasy and eventually wins. Before travelling, Shanaya signs a film in which she will play a "middle-class Gujarati wife". Her director, Mac Mundra (Ivan Rodrigues), advises her to live with a Gujarati family to understand the role. During their date, Shanaya considers staying with Praveen's family for a few days, unaware that he has falsely claimed to live only with his father and to be unmarried.

Praveen persuades Jigar to pose as his father, while Jigar enlists Naina to pose as Praveen's mother. He then invents a family emergency in India and sends Kokila there on the first available flight. Shanaya subsequently moves into the household, and Praveen delights in her presence, openly flirting with her and becoming increasingly affectionate.

One night, while Praveen is dancing in the rain with Shanaya, Kokila unexpectedly returns home. The following morning, Praveen's friend brings a "Kenyan" woman to teach garba to Shanaya. The woman is actually Kokila in disguise, but Praveen fails to recognise her. Meanwhile, he becomes jealous and possessive when he feels Shanaya is ignoring him in favour of her co-actor. After seeing her dancing with a band, he angrily demands to know why she has time for parties and her co-actor but not for him. Shanaya is insulted and decides to leave. She tells him that an actress's lifestyle requires a strong, secure partner who can cope with public attention, and that his insecurity would prevent him from doing so.

When Praveen returns from work, he finds a wedding being arranged and assumes he is about to marry Shanaya. Shanaya brings the "Kenyan" woman forward and asks him to marry her. Praveen finally admits that he has lied, explaining that he cannot marry either Shanaya or the woman because he is already married and loves his wife. The woman then reveals herself as Kokila. Shanaya explains that she and Kokila arranged the entire situation after Kokila returned home. Jigar and Naina become engaged, while Shanaya prepares to leave, reflecting that living with Praveen's family has taught her more about life than her role ever could.

== Cast ==
- Ram Kapoor as Praveen Patel (P. P.)
- Sunny Leone as Shanaya Khanna, an actress
- Evelyn Sharma as Naina Talwar (Jigar's fiancé)
- Navdeep Chhabra as Jigar Patel (Naina's fiancé)
- Suchita Trivedi as Kokila Patel (P. P.'s wife)
- Ivan Rodrigues as Film director Mac Mundra
- Mahendra Tambe as Vivek Hinduja
- Mehul Buch as Velji, P. P.'s best friend
- Kurush Deboo as Nauzer Daruwalla, P. P.'s best friend
- Avantika Khatri as Jacqueline

== Filming ==
Shooting for the film was to begin in late September, but because of the illness of the director, Dholakia, the filming was postponed. The cast and crew finally started the shoot from 12 November 2014 in Malaysia.

== Soundtrack ==
Kuch Kuch Locha Hai

Soundtrack album by: Dharam Sandeep; Aditya Dev; Amjad Nadeem
- Released: 24 April 2015
- Recorded: YRF Studios; Studio One; Aamir Khan Studio
- Genre: Feature film soundtrack
- Length: 28:11
- Label: Zee Music Company

Singles from Kuch Kuch Locha Hai
- 1. "Paani Wala Dance" Released: 8 April 2015; 2. "Daaru Peeke Dance" Released: 15 April 2015; 3. "Aao Na" Released: 24 April 2015; 4. "Na Jaane Kya Hai Tumse Wasta" Released: 29 April 2015; 5. "Yeh Ishq" Released: 1 May 2015

No.	Title	Lyrics	Music	Singer(s)	Length
1.	"Paani Wala Dance"	Ikka	Ikka, Intense, Arko	Ikka, Arko, Shraddha Pandit	3:58
2.	"Daaru Peeke Dance"	Sameer Anjaan	Amjad-Nadeem	Neha Kakkar, Aishwarya Nigam	3:38
3.	"Aao Na"	Arko	Arko	Ankit Tiwari, Shraddha Pandit	3:47
4.	"Na Jaane Kya Tumse Wasta"	Sanjeev Chaturvedi	Amjad-Nadeem	Jubin Nautiyal, Asees Kaur	3:55
5.	"Kuch Kuch Locha Hai"	Himank Kalal, Mani Soni	Amjad-Nadeem	Divya Kumar, Shraddha Pandit, Sandman	4:07
6.	"Ishq Da Maara"	Amjad-Nadeem	Amjad-Nadeem	Jubin Nautiyal	5:03
7.	"Yeh Ishq"		Ali Quli Mirza and King	Ali Quli Mirza	3:43
Total length:					28:11

== Reception ==
=== Critical reception ===
Upon release, the film was panned by critics. Renuka Vyavahare of the Times of India gave it one star and said, "You either have a sense of humour or you don't. If you try too hard to sound funny, it never works and that's the case here [...] the jaded film fails to keep you awake, let alone entertain, as it lacks a decent story and fails on multiple grounds. After all, the concept of young people dressing up as oldies is no longer funny or probably works in plays better." Giving the film 0.5 out of 5, Sonil Dedhia and Hitesh Harisinghnai of Rediff.com said the film is nothing but a cleavage fest and it would make perfect sense to give this film a miss, unless you are into bikinis and Gujju stereotypes. Akshay Kaushal of IBN Live gave the film 0.5 out of 5 and said, "Kuch Kuch Locha Hai guarantees to kill you of boredom.." He also criticized the poor performances of the cast, particularly that of debutant Navdeep Chhabra. Likewise, Rohit Vats of the Hindustan Times gave the film 0.5 and remarked, "Kuch Kuch Locha Hai is an insane, bizarre film with absolutely no intention of making the audience satiated in any which manner. Avoid it if you can. As far as the Sunny Leone fans are concerned, YouTube also has those songs."

Rahul Desai of Bangalore Mirror gave a rating of one and opined, "This is the kind of seedy effort that makes me wonder if director Dholakia wrapped up shooting every night, met friends at a bar and cackled at lewd jokes about which body part got maximum screen time. Before another male director has Leone play a nurse so that innuendos revolve around body exams and instruments, I suggest a blanket ban on bananas and Indian sex comedies."
