= Ishqedarriyaan =

2015 film by V. K. Prakash

- Poster
- Directed by: V. K. Prakash
- Produced by: Rajesh Banga
- Starring: Mahaakshay Chakraborty; Evelyn Sharma; Mohit Dutta
- Music by: Jeet Gannguli; Jaidev Kumar; Bilal Saeed
- Release date: 29 May 2015
- Running time: 135 minutes
- Country: India
- Language: Hindi
- Budget: Rs. 100 million

Ishqedarriyaan (transl. Romances) is a 2015 Bollywood romance film directed by V. K. Prakash and produced by Rajesh Banga, starring Mahaakshay Chakraborty, Evelyn Sharma and Mohit Dutta. The film was slated to release on 15 May 2015 with Bombay Velvet but hit the screens on 29 May 2015 for a solo release.

== Plot ==
Ishqedarriyaan is a story about love, sacrifice, family values and relationships. Rishteydarriyaan means relationships and Ishqedarriyaan signifies the relationship when one falls in love. Luvleen (Evelyn Sharma) is a teacher by profession who wants to collect donations for her grandfather's school. Aagam Diwan (Mahaakshay Chakraborty) is a millionaire who loves his profession more than anything else. When Aagam meets Luvleen, his love for her is really intense. But he didn't tell her about his feelings because of the wrong allegations against his father. He overcomes many hurdles to see her happy. He created conditions so that Arjun proposes Luvleen and even his father agrees to it. Mohit Dutta will play Arjun, a passionate singer. But in the end, Aagam realises that his father is not the one who did mischief with Luvleen's family. Later Luvleen also realises her love for Aagam and goes all the way to tell him the same. Finally they meet for a happy ending .

== Cast ==
- Mahaakshay Chakraborty as Agam Diwan
- Evelyn Sharma as Luvleen
- Mohit Dutta as Arjun
- Kavin Dave as Rahul
- Suhasini Mulay as Dadi
- Ravi Khemu as Arjun's father
- Yatharth Dholakia as Laddu
- Vrushali Chavan as Kaya

== Reception ==
Ishqedarriyaan opened to negative reviews from critics. The Times of India gave 1.5/5 stars to the film saying, "Evelyn Sharma for a change is not seen in skimpy outfits but her acting stays consistently poor, Mahaakshay is convincing but the film is way too tedious for you to sit through it. Music and locations are probably the best part about this film. Unfortunately, everything else is mediocre. Overall it turns out to be inconsequential in return. Despite decent production values, Ishqedarriyaan fails to click as it is way too clichéd. Conventional is fine as long as it leaves some impact on you as an audience, which doesn't happen here." Paloma Sharma of Rediff.com rote "The trouble with Ishqedarriyaan is that it isn't even bad enough to be good. It's just plain old dull. Lost in a world of its own, the film forgets to engage the viewer. The makers of the film might need to offer free tea at the screenings to give the audience an incentive to stay awake. The kindest thing I can say about Ishqedarriyaan is that it is yawn worthy." and gave the film 1.5/5 stars. The Indian Express gave 1/5 stars and wrote "Mahakshay returns in a badly-written romance, which makes you wonder why anyone would want to repeat the same mistakes. Ishqedarriyan features the age-old triangle of rich boy- poor girl- and third party, in a leaden plot that never takes off. We know who's going to win fair maiden in the end, but we have to wade through two hours and more of sheer tiresomeness to get there. Who is this film made for?" Book my Show stated that "The love story is sweet, but clichéd! An overdose of emotional drama makes this romantic saga a bore. A loose script, below par acting and clichéd romantic scenes, Ishqedarriyaan is a love saga that will bore you for two long hours! The film despite starting on a good note, loses grip after the first fifteen minutes."

== Promotions ==
The film Ishqedarriyaan was promoted across various cities in India. Lead actors Mahaakshay Chakraborty and Evelyn Sharma along with singer Asees Kaur were present. The film was promoted in cities like Indore, Bhopal, Pune (Central Mall), Nagpur, Raipur, Amritsar, Chandigarh, New Delhi and Jaipur.

== Soundtrack ==
Ishqedarriyaan

Soundtrack album by: Jeet Ganguly; Jaidev Kumar; Bilal Saeed
- Released: 24 April 2015
- Genre: Feature film soundtrack
- Length: 24:19
- Label: Zee Music Company

The songs of Ishqedarriyaan were composed by Jeet Gannguli, Jaidev Kumar and Bilal Saeed, while the lyrics were written by Kumaar, Kausar Munir, Manoj Muntashir and Bilal Saeed.

=== Track listing ===
No.	Title	Lyrics	Music	Singer(s)	Length
1.	"Judaa"	Kumaar	Jaidev Kumar	Arijit Singh	5:25
2.	"Mohabbat Yeh"	Adnan Choudhry	Bilal Saeed	Bilal Saeed	04:14
3.	"Ishqedarriyaan" (Title Song)	Kausar Munir	Jeet Gannguli	Ankit Tiwari	04:40
4.	"Mohabbat Yeh" (Reprise version)	Bilal Saeed	Bilal Saeed, Bloodline	Asees Kaur	03:31
5.	"Das Dae"	Kumaar	Jaidev Kumar	Mohit Chauhan	03:54
6.	"Georgia Se Jalandhar"	Manoj Muntashir	Jeet Gannguli	Master Saleem	02:38
Total length:					24:19
