= Jism 2 =

2012 film by Pooja Bhatt

- Theatrical release poster
- Directed by: Pooja Bhatt
- Written by: Mahesh Bhatt (story & screenplay); Shagufta Rafiq (dialogue)
- Produced by: Dino Morea
- Starring: Sunny Leone; Randeep Hooda; Arunoday Singh
- Cinematography: Nigam Bomzan
- Edited by: Devendra Murdeshwar
- Music by: Mithoon; Arko Pravo Mukherjee; Abdul Basit Sayeed; Rushk
- Production company: Clockwork Films Private Limited
- Distributed by: Fish Eye Network Pvt. Ltd. Vishesh Films
- Release date: 3 August 2012
- Running time: 130 minutes
- Country: India
- Language: Hindi
- Box office: ₹49 crore

Jism 2 (transl. Body 2) is a 2012 Indian Hindi-language erotic thriller film directed by Pooja Bhatt, written by Mahesh Bhatt and produced by Dino Morea. It is the sequel to the 2003 film Jism and marks the Bollywood acting debut of former pornographic actress Sunny Leone. Randeep Hooda and Arunoday Singh co-star alongside her.

Jism 2 was released in Indian theatres on 3 August 2012. It grossed ₹49 crore on a ₹7 crore budget and received mixed-to-negative reviews from critics. The first weekend collection was around Rs 20 crores. Jism 2 broke sale records of even Murder 2 and Jannat 2 in Punjab, UP and Delhi with regards to first weekend sales.

== Plot ==
A woman, Izna (Sunny Leone), is lying on the grass and near death. Before she dies, her voice states that she wants to ask forgiveness for her sins. The film then flashes back to six months.

Izna, a former pornographic actress, is approached by intelligence officer Aayan Thakur (Arunoday Singh). Aayan and his father, Security Chief Guru Saldanah (Arif Zakaria), want to hire Izna as a 'honey trap' and help them retrieve critical information from Kabir Wilson (Randeep Hooda), Izna's ex-boyfriend. Kabir used to work for the Intelligence Agency but went rogue and now operates as a hitman.

Izna tells Aayan and Guru Saldanah how she met Kabir six years ago; at the time, Kabir still worked for the agency. During one of his missions, he met Izna, who was unknowingly being used to smuggle drugs into a nightclub. That evening, Izna followed him home and handed him a love letter written in her own blood. They started dating until one day Kabir disappeared without telling Izna where he went. Although she desperately tried to find him, she was unable to and resigned herself from ever loving anyone again.

After Izna agrees to the mission, she is taken to a residential colony in Sri Lanka, where Kabir has been living as a musician for the last few months. Izna and Aayan go undercover as an engaged couple, with Aayan pretending to be Karan Rajput, a PR representative. To prepare, Izna is given a book with a detailed backstory on how she and 'Karan' met. Izna is then tasked with going to Kabir's house and introducing herself as his new neighbour. When Kabir sees Izna, he slams the door on her, which upsets her. Kabir tries to approach her the next day, but she angrily throws a rock at him. He follows her and writes "Sorry" on her window in his blood but quickly walks away when he gets a phone call.

Guru Saldanah's team tries to extract the information themselves but is killed by Kabir. Saldanah narrowly escapes. Aayan plans to steal data from Kabir's laptop and asks Izna to distract Kabir. She sends a letter to Kabir, telling him that she wants to meet him. After Kabir leaves his house, Aayan breaks in to steal the data. However, when he copies the data from Kabir's laptop, it triggers a silent alarm. After receiving an alert on his phone, Kabir hurries back to his house. Aayan narrowly escapes with the data, but he later discovers that it had all been falsified information. After Aayan tells her how many people Kabir has killed, Izna promises she will bring Kabir down.

Kabir's trusted friend Sumit suspects that Izna is involved with the Intelligence Agency and warns Kabir about her. Kabir tells him he has no reason to suspect her. Kabir proposes to Izna and asks her to move in with him and leave 'Karan'. Izna accepts his proposal, thinking it would be beneficial to their mission. Aayan, who has since fallen in love with Izna, gets angry when he finds out. Izna tells him she believes she'll be able to steal the data more easily when she moves into Kabir's house. He agrees, and she soon moves into Kabir's house. Kabir asks Sumit to find a priest to conduct the marriage. However, Sumit accidentally reads a text message from Aayan on Izna's phone, proving his suspicions that she's working with the Intelligence Agency. He attacks Aayan and tries to kill him, but instead is killed himself when Aayan shoots him. Aayan meets up with Izna to discuss the mission. He warns her that Kabir might try to kill her when he finds out that Sumit has been murdered and she is involved. Aayan gives her poison and asks her to mix it into Kabir's drink.

When Izna is not at home, Kabir goes to Aayan's house and notices Sumit's hearing aid on the floor inside. Kabir breaks into the house and ends up discovering the book with the story Izna had told him about how she met 'Karan'. He finally believes that Izna is working with the Intelligence Agency and waits for her. When she returns home, she offers to make him coffee. However, she blends the poison Aayan had given her into the coffee she serves him. Kabir tells Izna that years ago, he had left Izna because he had found out during a sting operation that some of the Intelligence Agency's operatives, as well as some politicians and officers, were corrupt. Not wanting to work for a corrupt organization, he had shortlisted them and then killed them. He tells Izna that he's a patriot.

Dumping out the poisoned coffee undrunk, Kabir tells Izna that Guru Saldanah is corrupt and that his team consists of impostors who are after incriminating data, which Kabir keeps stored on a hard disk. He states that Guru Saldanah is running an unsanctioned operation to retrieve the information and will kill Izna once he gets the hard disk. Kabir asks Izna to escape and offers her a new passport, tickets, and access to an account maintained at a Swiss bank from which she can withdraw unlimited money. Izna does not believe him though, and when Kabir kisses her, she shoots him in the stomach, after which he dies. Running away with the hard disk containing the original data, she goes to Guru Saldanah and hands over the hard disk. However, she is quickly surprised to discover that Kabir was telling the truth and Guru Saldanah is indeed corrupt. He tells Izna that after the mission, she was supposed to have been killed. Aayan was given this responsibility, but he had changed his mind as he had fallen in love with her. As Guru Saldanah tries to kill Izna himself, Aayan tackles him and kills him instead.

Aayan asks Izna to give him the hard drive and come with him to start a new life together in Europe. Izna declines his offer and tells Aayan that because of his lies, she killed the love of her life, an innocent man who blindly trusted her. She tells him that she would rather die with Kabir than spend another day alive with Aayan and attempts to leave with the hard disk. Aayan threatens to shoot Izna if she doesn't change her mind. After Izna ignores him and leaves the house, Aayan follows her out in the yard and shoots her in the back. After she falls down, Aayan approaches her and turns her over. Still alive, Izna, who was still holding the gun with which she killed Kabir, shoots Aayan twice in the chest and instantly kills him.

Before dying, Izna sees a vision of Kabir, who tells her he forgives her. She tells him that without him, heaven is not a heaven, and with him, she has no reason to be afraid of hell. The film ends as Izna dies.

== Cast ==
- Sunny Leone as Izna, an adult film star turned into a spy (Voice dubbed by Smita Malhotra)
- Randeep Hooda as Kabir Wilson (Assassin / Patriot)
- Arunoday Singh as Ayaan Thakur (Intelligence Officer) / Karan Rajput (PR Representative of Devi group of Hotels)
- Arif Zakaria as Guru Saldanah (Security Chief Intelligence) / Mr. Thakur, Ayaan's father
- Sumit Nijhawan as Sumit, Kabir's friend
- Imran Zahid as Imran, a Narcotics Detective and Kabir's assistant

== Production ==
=== Casting ===
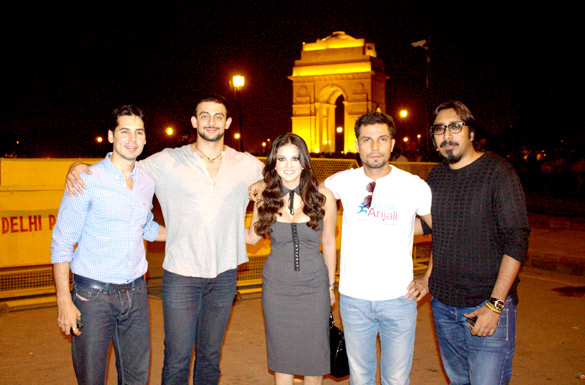
Sunny Leone with Dino Morea and Randeep Hooda

Producer-director Mahesh Bhatt entered the house of Bigg Boss for a couple of hours to present a contract deal to Sunny Leone to cast her as the lead actress in this sequel of the film Jism. The film would be directed by his producer-actress daughter Pooja Bhatt.

Of casting Leone in the film, Pooja Bhatt said, "I signed Sunny Leone for the same reason I signed John Abraham in Jism. It was instinct. I broke the perception that models can't act with Jism. Now, I am looking forward to break another perception by signing Sunny Leone, a pornstar in Jism 2." Comparing the two films, Bhatt said that "Jism was a love story for mature audience, Jism 2 is for mature adult audience. We are looking at raising the bar in every sense – emotionally and sensually. It would be the story of human heart, crime of passion, revenge, betrayal, the same elements that made Jism, with a fresh story".

=== Filming ===
Filming began on 1 April 2012, in Jaipur. The second schedule of Jism 2 was shot in Goa. The last and final shooting schedule of Jism 2 was in Sri Lanka. The movie was released in cinemas on 3 August 2012. It was announced the film would be released in two hundred cinemas in Andhra Pradesh, although dubbed in Telugu. Director Bhatt was very fond of Leone's performance as Izna.

=== Film certification ===
The CBFC was initially not satisfied with the lengthy sex scenes in Jism 2, and declined to issue a certificate. It objected to several scenes, including the oil massage scene where Izna turns around and a prominent portion of her breast was visible.

Subsequently, the film was granted an A-certificate after Pooja Bhatt made some cuts. She stated that the cuts had not affected the film overall.

== Release ==
=== Critical reception ===
Professional ratings
Review scores
Source	Rating
Firstpost	1/5 stars
NDTV	3/5 stars
Rediff.com	1.5/5 stars
Daily Bhaskar	2.5/5 stars
The Times of India	3.5/5 stars
Daily News and Analysis	1/5 stars
Apunkachoice.com	3/5 stars
Koimoi	3.5/5 stars
Mumbai Mirror	2/5 stars
The Indian Express	1.5/5 stars
IBN	1/5 stars
Hindustan Times	2/5 stars
Bollywood Hungama	2/5 stars
Independent Bollywood	1/5 stars

Jism 2 received mixed to negative reviews from critics. Srijana Mitra Das of the Times of India rated the movie 3.5 out 5 and stated, "Jism-2 is a sexy movie – but it's not as dirty a picture as you might expect. Surprisingly, Jism-2 hovers over sex, like a butterfly gliding across one of the many water pools the movie features. Jism-2 offers several surprises, foremost being Leone's performance."

Taran Adarsh of Bollywood Hungama gave the film a score of 2 out of 5, and said, "On the whole, JISM 2 has Sunny Leone as its USP, but the lackluster screenplay and the sluggish pace act as deterrents. However, Sunny Leone in the driver's seat, coupled with a generous dose of skin show and erotica, besides an attention-grabbing title, should act as a honey-trap to lure the audiences. But how one wishes this jism had soul as well!"

Anupama Chopra of the Hindustan Times gave it 2 out 5 noting, "I thought that Jism 2 is a sequel only because it also has sex, might push the envelope again. The film is an anti-climactic let-down.".

Sukanya Verma of Rediff.com gave the film a score of 1.5 out of 5, concluding that "It's like Sunny Leone's assets are the script, screenplay and sole purpose of Jism 2 and everyone outside that – Hooda, Singh, Zakaria or the audience – is obliged to wag their tongues with thrill. Well, duh, for thinking otherwise."

Mayank Shekhar on his website theW14.com writes,"By the time you hit the climax, of the film of course, you realise, there was hardly more sex in it than any other skin flick, and you had to sit through two growling naked guys (Arunoday, Randeep) and a psycho boss (Arif Zakaria) instead, babbling over international terrorism. Audiences are known to giggle at uncomfortable sex scenes."

Rajeev Masand of CNN-IBN awarded it a score of 1 out of 5 while commenting that he thinks "the plot itself is like a big, black hole there is no coming out of. For all its pretentious babble on love and pain, it's a film that leaves your own jism in much pain as you finally get out of your seat."

Independent Bollywood gave 1 out of 5 stars and commented "No Jism in Jism 2".

=== Protests ===
The promotion and release of Jism 2 sparked protests by social conservatives across India, including by the National Students Union of India in Allahabad, Bajrang Dal in Bhopal, Assam, Amritsar (where effigies of Leone and Pooja Bhatt were burned) and Mumbai (where protesters tore down posters promoting the film). Some protesters also took legal action against the showing of the film. Rakesh Nayayik, an activist from Varanasi, accused Jism 2 of illegally promoting a porn star, and filed a PIL in the Allahabad High Court to try to get the film banned.

== Box office ==
=== Domestic ===
Jism 2 opened well with collections above 90% on average and some places having stronger collections in the 60–70% range in its opening day. Jism 2 performed strongly on its opening day at the box office with collection of around ₹75.0 million (US$780,000) adding to the ₹15.0 million (US$160,000) nett paid previews. The film had a huge fall on the second day as it collected around ₹55.0 million (US$570,000) mainly due to negative critical reception and word of mouth. Jism 2 scored well over its first weekend due to a good opening including paid previews at around ₹205.0 million (US$2.1 million). The film dropped on Monday and collected around ₹25.0 million (US$260,000), on Tuesday there was a further drop collecting, ₹17.5 million (US$180,000) taking the five-day business of the film to ₹247.5 million (US$2.6 million) nett. Jism 2 had a decent first week of ₹295.0 million (US$3.1 million) nett including business from paid previews. The film had a steep good in its second weekend collecting around ₹85.0 million (US$880,000) nett. Jism 2 did good in week two and collected around ₹145.0 million (US$1.5 million) and taking its two-week total to around ₹345.0 million (US$3.6 million) nett. Boxofficeindia declared the film as "Semi-Hit". After three weeks its total is ₹3,490.7 million (US$36 million).

=== Overseas ===
Jism 2 took in around $100,000 overseas. It had released on around 60 prints there in four days.

== Soundtrack ==
The soundtrack of Jism 2 is composed by Arko, Mithoon, Abdul Basit Sayeed & Rushk a Pakistani gothic fiction band. The new composers replaced the original composer of Jism, M M Kreem.

Jism 2

Soundtrack album by Arko Mithoon Abdul Basit Sayeed Rushk
- Released: 6 July 2012
- Recorded: 2012
- Genre: Soundtrack
- Length: 35:31
- Label: T-Series
- Producers: Arko; Mithoon; Abdul Basit Sayeed; Rushk

Track list
No.	Title	Lyrics	Music	Singer(s)	Length
1.	"Abhi Abhi" (Male)	Manish Makhija, Arko	Arko	KK	5:43
2.	"Yeh Kasoor Mera Hai"	Mithoon	Mithoon	Sonu Kakkar	5:49
3.	"Maula"	Manish Makhija, Arko	Arko	Ali Azmat	5:08
4.	"Yeh Jism Hai Toh Kya"	Manish Makhija, Arko	Arko	Ali Azmat	3:51
5.	"Darta Hoon" (Adhoora)	Rushk	Rushk	Rushk	5:25
6.	"Abhi Abhi" (Duet with Shreya Ghoshal)	Manish Makhija, Arko	Arko	KK, Shreya Ghoshal	5:43
7.	"Abhi Abhi" (Duet with Akriti Kakar)	Manish Makhija, Arko	Arko	KK, Akriti Kakar	5:00
8.	"Hey Walla"	Abdul Baasith Saeed, Unoosha	Abdul Basit Sayeed	Unoosha	3:52
Total length:					35:31

=== Reception ===
The music of the movie was met with mostly positive reviews. Joginder Tuteja of Bollywood Hungama gave 3 and half out of 5 stars and concluded "Ultimately, Jism 2 delivers a tad more than what seemed like a promise before the album was played. A package affair that goes well with the theme of the film, it also ensures that there is a consistent sound right through the album which doesn't distract a listener or make him jump into the next track". He picked Abhi Abhi, Maula, Yeh Jism as his favourite. Times of India rated it with 4 stars out of five and remarked "The soundtrack has been assembled well and its variety will prove to be its key to success. It also backs the sensuality of the film quite well".

== Awards and nominations ==
Award	Category	Recipients and nominees	Result	Ref.
5th Mirchi Music Awards	Upcoming Music Composer of The Year	Arko Pravo Mukherjee – "Abhi Abhi"	Nominated	
5th Mirchi Music Awards	Upcoming Lyricist of The Year	Arko Pravo Mukherjee & Manish Makhija – "Abhi Abhi"	Nominated	
5th Mirchi Music Awards	Song representing Sufi tradition	"Maula"	Nominated	
