= Sunny Leone =

Canadian-American actress, model, and media personality (born 1981)

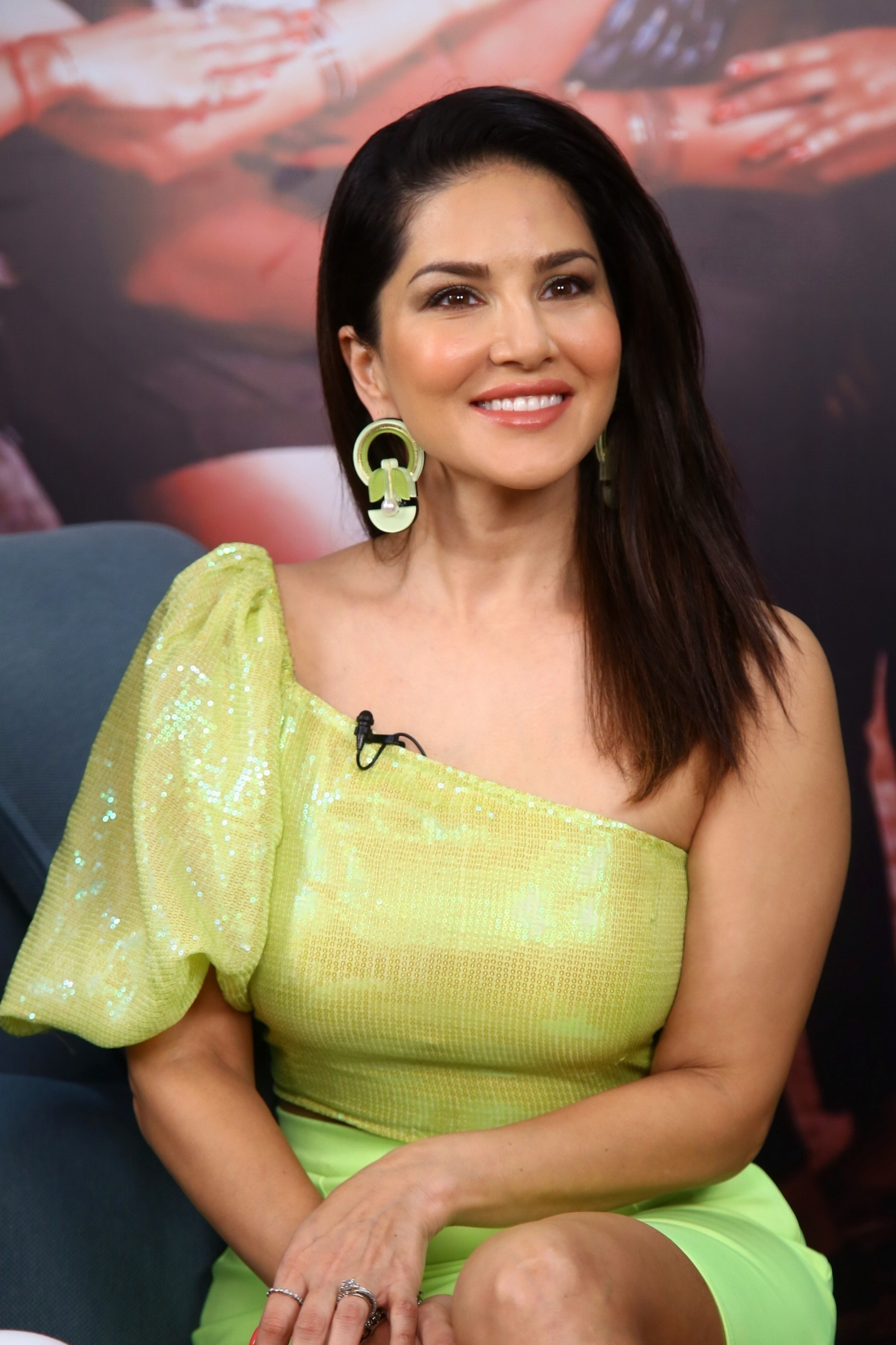
- Leone in 2022
- Born: Karenjit Kaur Vohra; May 13, 1981 (age 45); Sarnia, Ontario, Canada
- Other names: Karen Malhotra; Karenjit Kaur; Karenjit Kaur Weber
- Citizenship: Canada; United States
- Occupations: Actress; former pornographic actress
- Years active: 2001–present
- Works: Full list
- Spouse: Daniel Weber (m. 2011)
- Children: 3
- Awards: Full list
- Website: sunnyleoneofficial.com

Karenjit "Karen" Kaur Vohra (born May 13, 1981), known by her stage name Sunny Leone, is a Canadian-American actress, model, media personality and former pornographic actress who works in Hindi films. Active in Hindi cinema since the 2010s, she is known for her leading roles in erotic thrillers and appearing in several popular item numbers, and is cited by various media outlets as a sex symbol. On television, Leone is one of the presenters of Indian reality show MTV Splitsvilla. She was named Penthouse Pet of the Year in 2003 and was inducted into the AVN Hall of Fame in 2018.

She has played roles in independent mainstream events, films, and television series. Her first mainstream appearance was in 2005, when she worked as a red carpet reporter for the MTV Video Music Awards on MTV India. In 2011, she participated in the Indian reality television series Bigg Boss. She also has hosted the Indian reality show Splitsvilla.

In 2012, she made her Bollywood debut in Pooja Bhatt's erotic thriller Jism 2 (2012) and shifted her focus to mainstream acting which was followed up with Jackpot (2013), Ragini MMS 2 (2014), Ek Paheli Leela (2015), Tera Intezaar (2017), and the Malayalam film Madhura Raja in 2019.

Apart from her acting career, she has been part of activism campaigns including the Rock 'n' Roll Los Angeles Half-Marathon to raise money for the American Cancer Society and has also posed for a People for the Ethical Treatment of Animals (PETA) ad campaign with a rescued dog, encouraging pet owners to have their cats and dogs spayed and neutered.

== Early life ==
Karenjit Kaur Vohra was born on May 13, 1981, in Sarnia, Ontario, to Sikh Indian Punjabi parents. As a young girl, she was a self-described tomboy, as she was very athletic and played street hockey with the boys.

Although the family was Sikh, her parents enrolled her in Catholic school as it was felt to be unsafe for her to go to public school. When she was 13, her family moved to Fort Gratiot Township, Michigan, then to Lake Forest, California, a year later, fulfilling her grandparents' dream that the family be together in one place. She had her first kiss at 11, lost her virginity at 16 with a basketball player, and discovered her bisexuality at 18.

== Pornographic career ==
Before working in the porn industry, Leone worked at a German bakery, a Jiffy Lube store, and later a tax and retirement firm. She was also studying to become a nurse.

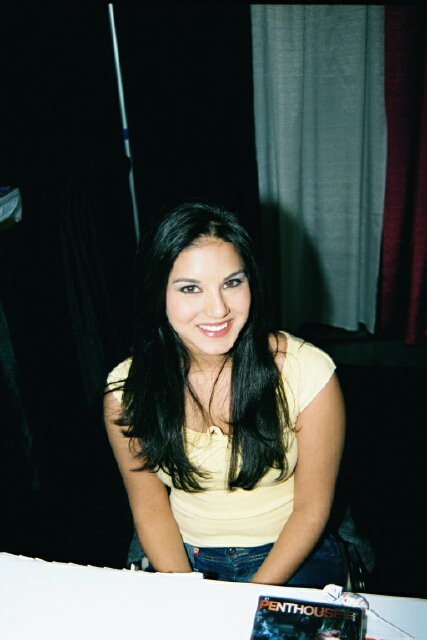
Leone at the 2002 AVN Adult Entertainment Expo, one of her earliest promotional appearances

When picking a name for her adult career, Leone has stated that Sunny is her real name and that Leone was picked by Bob Guccione, former owner of Penthouse magazine. After posing for that magazine, she was named Penthouse Pet of the Month for the March 2001 issue, followed by a feature in the Holiday 2001 edition of Hustler magazine as a Hustler Honey. She has also appeared in other magazines including Cheri, Mystique Magazine, High Society, Swank, AVN Online, Leg World, Club International and Lowrider, while her online credits include ModFX Models, Suze Randall, Ken Marcus and Mac & Bumble.

In 2003, she was named "Penthouse Pet of the Year" and starred in the video Penthouse Pets in Paradise alongside Tera Patrick and Kyla Cole. In 2005 Adam & Eve appointed her as their West Coast Internet Sales Representative.

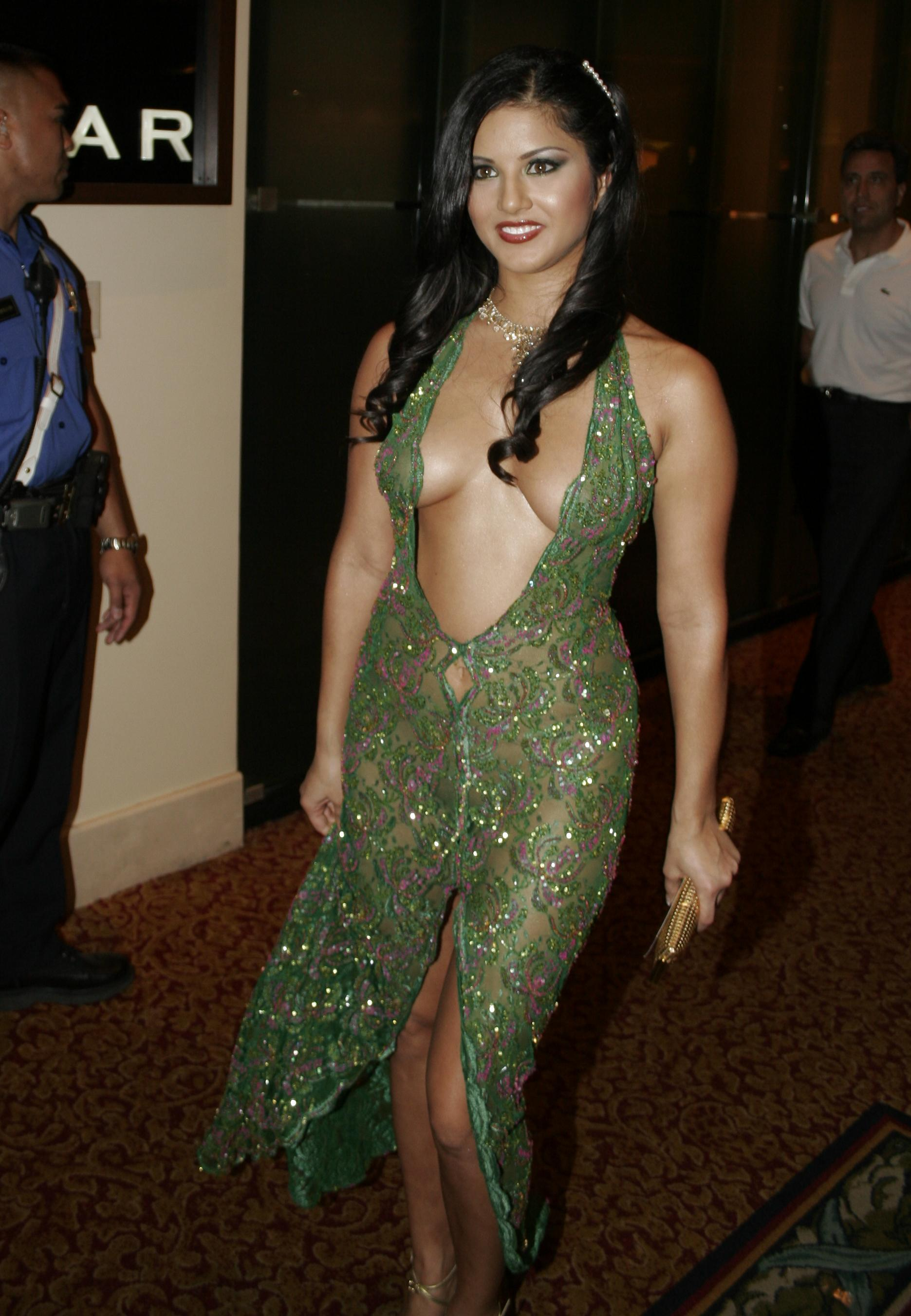
Leone at AVN Awards 2006

That same year, Leone signed a three-year contract with Vivid Entertainment with which she transitioned into hardcore pornography, stating that she would only do lesbian scenes. Her first movie released was titled Sunny, and was released in December 2005. Her next movie, Virtual Vivid Girl Sunny Leone, was the first interactive title for Leone, who was the first Vivid Girl to make such a movie. Taking only four days to film, the movie won her first AVN Award (Best Interactive DVD). She followed this with Sunny Loves Cher, which featured her first on-screen squirting, and The Female Gardner co-starring Mikayla Mendez and Daisy Marie.

Leone's last two movies under her contract with Vivid were It's Sunny in Brazil, which was filmed in Brazil, and The Sunny Experiment. The movies were released in October and December 2007, respectively.

In May 2007, upon re-signing her contract with Vivid for another six films, Leone agreed to do her first boy/girl scenes, though only with her fiancé, Matt Erikson. That year she underwent breast augmentation, and shot her first movie under the new contract titled Sunny Loves Matt. For that film she was nominated for three (out of six) AVN awards in 2009, in addition to being a choice for Female Performer of the Year. She followed up her first boy-girl title with The Other Side of Sunny in October 2008, which would be the last time she would perform with Erikson.

In January 2008, Leone revealed that she was no longer exclusive to Erikson, and had done scenes with other actors, including Tommy Gunn, Charles Dera, James Deen and Voodoo.

In 2009, Vivid released her only adult movie performing with multiple male actors, titled "Sunny B/G Adventure". Her final release under contract with Vivid – Undress Me, once again made her exclusive to performing with just one male actor, Daniel Weber (he performed under the stage name Ariel King), who subsequently became her husband.

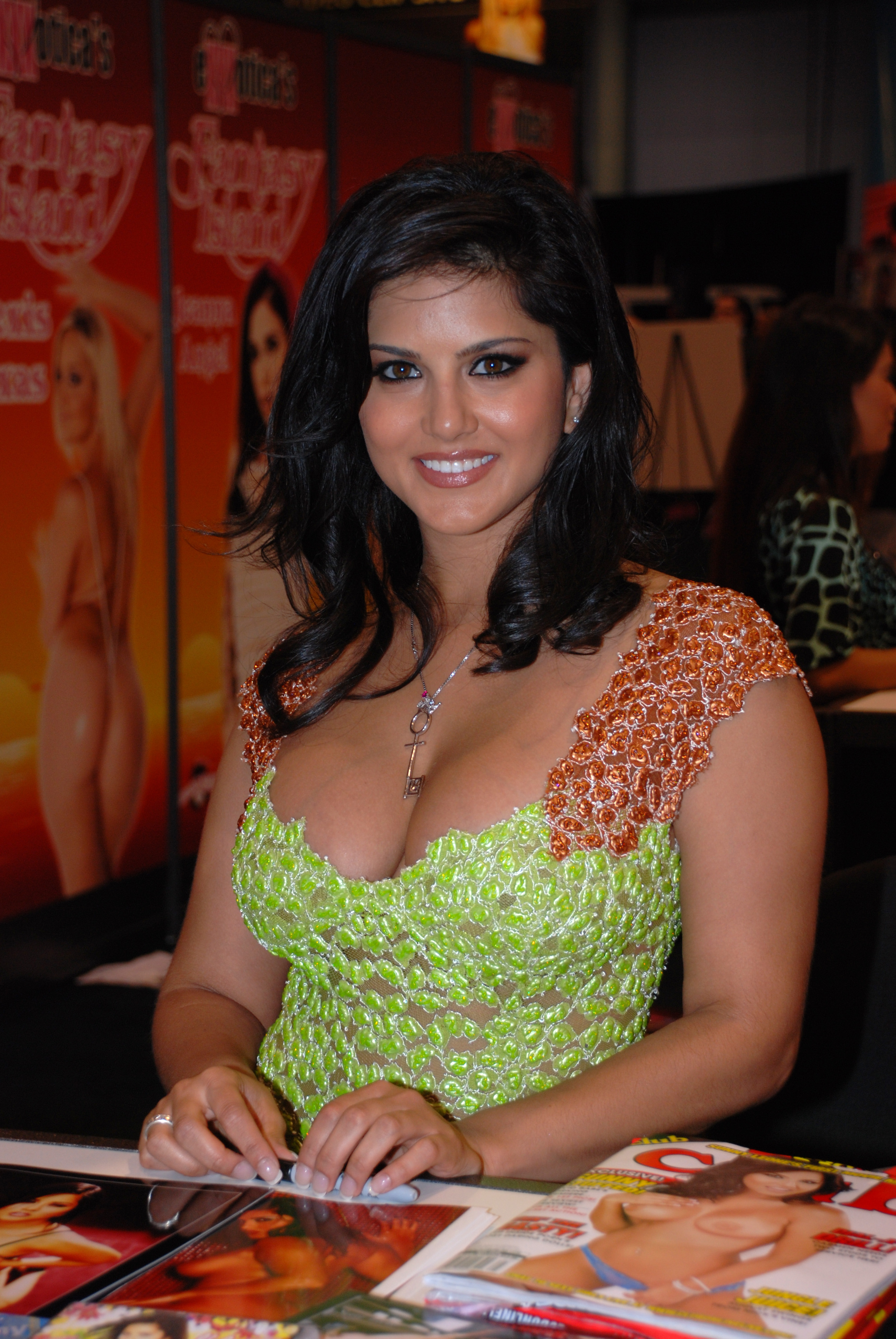
Leone at Exxxotica Expo, 2009, Miami

In August 2009, she announced the launch of her own studio, Sunlust Pictures, with Daniel Weber as her partner. With her new venture Leone announced her plans to write, direct and create her own brand of adult movies with Vivid Entertainment as her distributor. Her first independent production, The Dark Side of the Sun, was released in March 2009, and was debuted at the Erotic Heritage Museum in Las Vegas. In June 2009, she held a casting call in Las Vegas for her second independent production titled Sunny Slumber Party, which was released in September 2009. She followed up with three other self-produced features; Gia Portrait of a Porn Star (2010) which was nominated for multiple AVN awards, Roleplay (2011) and Goddess (2012) which featured her first anal sex scene.

No longer exclusive to Vivid, Leone began working with other studios and performers since 2009. She formed deals with firms like PPPcard, AdultPokerParty.com, Brickhouse, Flirt4Free, Totemcash, and Imlive to sell and distribute her content over the Internet and other media. She won the "Web Babe of the Year" at the 2008 Xbiz Awards. Her websites and business interests are run under her banner company Leone L.L.C. She indicated in an April 2012 interview that 80 per cent of the traffic on her website, and 60 per cent of her revenue comes from India.

Leone was part of the Vivid Comedy Tour, and has modelled for the Vivid Footwear collection. Leone has also participated in events like the Vivid/ClubJenna Lingerie Bowl and Vivid's Hot Rod Night. Doc Johnson launched a pocket pal in 2006 moulded to her vagina, and in 2008 released the Sunny Leone Exciter vibrator. Control MFG used Leone's image along with other Vivid girls to market their line of skateboards. She is paired with Gab Ekoe, one of the Team Control riders. She also indicated that she plans to launch her own line of lingerie and other Sunny-branded products including a diamond jewellery line.

In September 2009, an iPhone application consisting of a collection of non-nude photos, some videos and a porn star-penned blog was approved by Apple for sale in the iTunes store, making it the first officially sanctioned application featuring a porn actor. By February 2010, the app had been removed by Apple from the store.

Leone was voted number 13 (up from number 41 in 2007) on Genesis magazine's "Top 100 Porn stars" list, number 34 on Desiclubs.com's Top 50 Coolest Desis of 2004, and one of the "40 under 40" ranking on AVN Online magazine. In 2010, she was named by Maxim as one of the 12 top female stars in porn. In 2012, she was voted number 82 in the Top 99 Women in AskMen.com's list and was named by CNBC as one of the 12 most popular stars in porn..

In 2013, she announced her retirement from the adult industry, stating: "I am lucky that the audience is accepting me. I have come my way from there (porn industry). I don't have any plans as of now to go back there."

In 2016, she was chosen as one of BBC's 100 Women.

== Mainstream appearances prior to 2011 ==
Leone's first mainstream appearance was in 2005, when she was a red carpet reporter for the MTV Awards on MTV India. She has also had a cameo in the film The Girl Next Door, performed in Ja Rule's video "Livin' It Up", and a video for Kidd Skilly. Other credits include E!'s Wild On! and the Sundance Film Festival's After Dark. Leone was a contestant in the second season of the Fox reality show My Bare Lady 2: Open for Business, in which a group of adult actresses were given classes and training on how to pitch investment ideas and competed for success in the business world. In addition to filming her scene for Debbie Does Dallas in 2007, Leone was also part of a Showtime documentary of the same name detailing the production of the movie and the personal lives of its stars.

She indicated that for the right price she would seriously consider a career in Bollywood. She was courted by Indian directors in the past but felt uncomfortable with the roles that she would have played. Director Mohit Suri reportedly asked Leone to play the lead role in his film Kalyug, but instead cast Deepal Shaw as he could not afford Leone's $1 million acting fee. She has mentioned that Aamir Khan is her favorite Bollywood actor, and that over 60% of her fans are from South Asia.

In 2008, Leone announced that she would be starring in a mainstream action adventure movie titled Pirates Blood, which was shot in Oman. The shooting was completed in two weeks and was to be released in winter 2008. Leone also landed a role in Middle Men, producer Chris Mallick's indie feature about the birth of the online porn industry set for wide theatrical release in 2009. She appeared in the 2010 film The Virginity Hit playing a version of herself, where she is hired to take the virginity of the lead character.

Leone has made appearances at events such as the 2002 SEMA International Auto Salon, the 2002 Extreme Autofest Pomona and the 2006 World Series of Poker in Las Vegas. She also served as hostess at events in clubs like the Mansion in Miami and the Highlands in Hollywood.

In 2005, she was mentioned in Forbes magazine for a story on Vivid Entertainment. Leone has also been featured in mainstream publications like FHM, Front and Jane magazine. In 2007, along with the other Vivid Girls, she was seen in a 48' high holiday billboard in Times Square at W. 48th Street and Seventh Avenue. She is among the Penthouse Pets who appears in the 2007 video game Pocket Pool, and was featured in a coffee table book titled Naked Ambition: An R Rated Look at an X Rated Industry by Michael Grecco.

== Indian film career ==
=== Bigg Boss and entry into Bollywood (2011–2013) ===
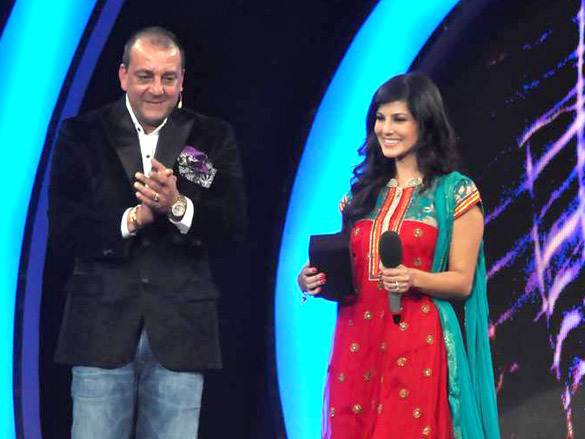
Leone with show host Sanjay Dutt after her eviction from the Bigg Boss house

In 2011, she participated in the Indian reality series Bigg Boss 5, entering the house on day 49. It was reported that she caused a stir in the larger populace with her Twitter feed gaining 8,000 new followers in just 2 days and Google saying searches for her experienced a "breakout". There were also complaints lodged with the Indian Ministry of Information and Broadcasting alleging that the Colors TV channel was promoting pornography by having Leone appear on the show; among those who filed are the Indian Artistes and Actors Forum and Anurag Thakur, member of Lok Sabha and head of the Bharatiya Janata Party's youth wing. She was evicted on Day 91.

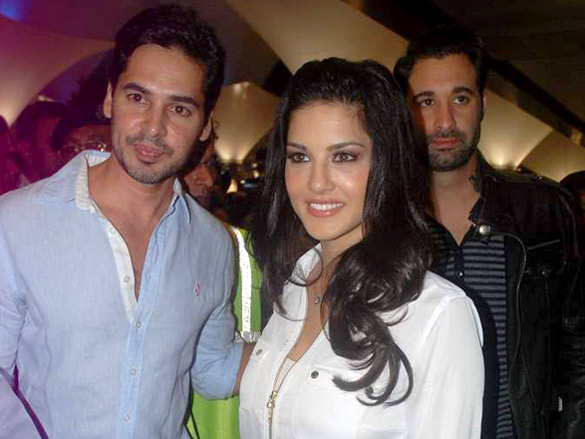
Leone on the set of Jism 2 with Dino Morea in 2012

During her stay in the Bigg Boss house, Leone was approached by Bollywood film-maker Mahesh Bhatt who entered the house briefly to offer her the lead role in Dino Morea's Jism 2 (the sequel to the 2003 film Jism). She accepted it, which resulted in Pooja Bhatt's production house, Fish Eye Network and Leone's agent discussing the movie further. Leone entered Bollywood in 2012 with the film Jism 2 to weak critical reception but was commercially successful. Sunny Leone signed her second Bollywood film, Ragini MMS 2, sequel to Ekta Kapoor's crossover horror movie Ragini MMS. Sunny Leone featured in an item number in the Sanjay Gupta and Ekta Kapoor's 2013 film Shootout at Wadala. Her next role was for Kaizad Gustad's Jackpot which was panned by critics.

=== Ragini MMS 2 and further success (2014–present) ===
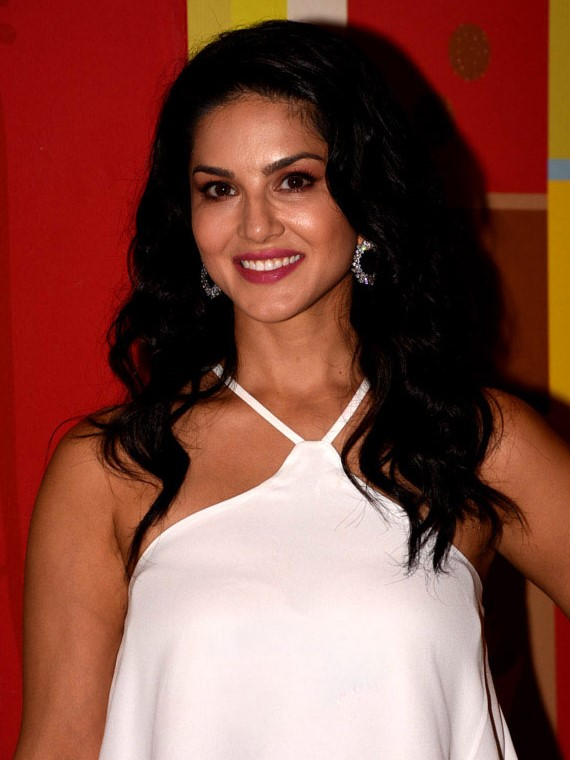
Leone in 2018 in Mumbai

Her first release of 2014 was the much anticipated horror film Ragini MMS 2, which proved to be a box-office hit. Leone's performance received all round praise with critic Mohar Basu calling her work a "revelation". Critic Taran Adarsh also noted that Leone, "carries off her character with supreme confidence". In November 2013, she had confirmed that she would make her Tamil film debut in Vadacurry which released in May 2014 and featured her in a special appearance. She next appeared in the item number Pink Lips for the film Hate Story 2. After giving a hit number Pink Lips, she appeared once again in Shake That Booty opposite Mika Singh from his film Balwinder Singh Famous Ho Gaya. She made her acting debut in the Telugu film industry by appearing in a cameo in Current Theega opposite Manchu Manoj and Rakul Preet Singh where she played a school teacher.

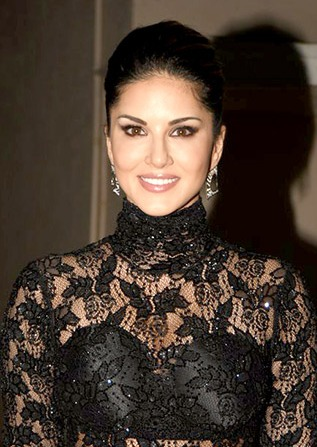
Leone at Mehboob Studios in 2016

Leone then appeared in item song Sesamma Bagilu Tegiyamma in Kannada film DK, which marked her debut in Kannada film industry. In April 2015, Leone appeared in Bobby Khan's musical thriller Ek Paheli Leela, where she portrayed dual roles as Leela, a village belle and Meera, a supermodel from Milan. The film was released on April 10, 2015. The film met with mixed to negative reviews but was a commercial success with collections of ₹27.47 crore (US$2.9 million). After a little gap, post the release of Ek Paheli Leela, she appeared in Devang Dholakia's Kuch Kuch Locha Hai was released on May 8, 2015. She essayed the role of a film star opposite Ram Kapoor, Evelyn Sharma and Navdeep Chabbra. The film emerged to be a critical and commercial failure. She did her second Kannada song "Kamakshi" from the film Luv U Alia. Last in 2015, she appeared in a cameo in Akshay Kumar's Singh is Bling.

In January 2016, she appeared in Milap Zaveri's adult comedy Mastizaade, released on January 29, 2016, where she portrayed twin sisters, Laila and Lily Lele along with Tusshar Kapoor and Vir Das. The film released to mixed reviews and was an average earner. One critic said "Leone may not be better than this film, but she's the best thing in it." Her next film was Jasmine D'souza's One Night Stand with Tanuj Virwani released on May 6, 2016. The film was released to mixed reviews but was a flop commercially. Her last release of 2016 was Rajeev Chaudary's Beiimaan Love opposite Rajneesh Duggal that released on October 14, 2016. Her performance was widely praised but the film met with negative reviews and flopped. She also appeared in song "Tu Zaroorat Nahi Tu Zaroori Hai" with Sharman Joshi in Fuddu and item song "Choli Blockbuster" for the film Dongri Ka Raja. In December 2016, her song "Laila Main Laila" from Raees with Shah Rukh Khan was released.

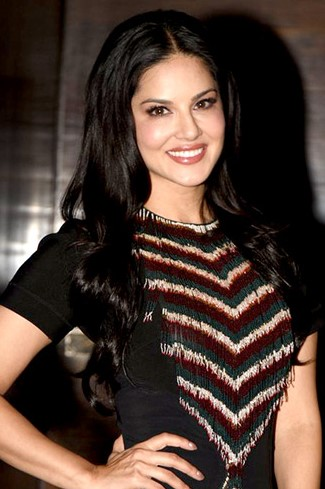
Leone at a promotion event of Raees in 2017

In April 2017, she appeared in a cameo for Sonakshi Sinha's Noor where she is portrayed the role of an actress. She then appeared in song "Piya More" with Emraan Hashmi in Milan Luthria's Baadshaho. In addition, she appeared in song "Trippy Trippy" in Sanjay Dutt's comeback film, Bhoomi released on September 22, 2017. She also made her Marathi and Bengali film debuts the same month with songs "Kuth Kuth Jayacha Honeymoon La" in Vishal Devrukhkar's Boyz and "Chaap Nishna" in Swapan Saha's Shrestha Bangali. She then appeared in song "Deo Deo" for Rajasekhar's Telugu film PSV Garuda Vega Her last appearance was her mainstream film Tera Intezaar along Arbaaz Khan directed by Rajeev Walia. The film released on December 1, 2017.

Producer and distributor Bharat Patel has accused Leone of not returning a signing fee which she had taken to do a special dance number for his film Patel Ki Punjabi Shaadi after her role was cancelled.

Sunny Leone was voted by the Network 7 Media Group jury as "Indian Affairs Actress of the year 2018" founded by Satya Brahma at the historic ninth Annual India Leadership Conclave & Indian Affairs Business Leadership Awards 2018.

Sunny Leone's auto biopic titled Karenjit Kaur – The Untold Story of Sunny Leone, an original web-series by ZEE5, was released on the platform on July 16, 2018. The series narrates her journey from a middle-class girl in Canada to becoming India's most googled celebrity. The series starts from her childhood as Gogu to her foray into the adult film industry to her exciting journey into Bollywood. The series is also available in Bengali, Tamil, Telugu and Marathi languages.

=== Upcoming projects ===
In January 2018, Leone started filming for the Hindi remake of 2012 Punjabi film Jatt & Juliet opposite Manish Paul. She is also stars in Veeramadevi, a Tamil period war film directed by V. C. Vadivudaiyan. The shooting for the film commenced in February 2018 and was set to be released in Telugu, Hindi, and Malayalam.

== Writer ==
Sweet Dreams is a collection of 12 short stories written by Sunny Leone. They were published digitally as an e-book and launched on April 22, 2016, by Juggernaut Books through their mobile app. A story was made available on the app at 10pm every night. A 200-page paperback edition was also launched in 2016.

The work was well received by the Hindustan Times, which commented, "Sunny's stories are relentlessly optimistic. The characters are not complicated or unpleasant and exist in a world that veers on the border of Valentine's Land with its floating pink hearts and soft focus lighting."

In an interview to Press Trust of India, Leone explained that the book was written from the perspective of both men and females, and that while it was for both genders it was mainly intended for women, stating, "I wrote these stories, from what I thought a woman would like to read." Sunny Leone add that it is "the first time (she has) written something like this." In the interview she mentioned how Juggernaut Books had come to her with this idea of writing the book.

Sweet Dreams was Elle's Book of the Week in April 2016. The publication wrote, "Don't go looking for creative fantasies or fetishes; as a writer, Leone is playing safe." Another review in Bollywood Hungama goes on to note if there was any real contribution from Sunny herself towards the book other than her picture on the cover. The review goes on say that there is "no note by (the) author, acknowledgments section, or forward from some known entity."

== Activism ==
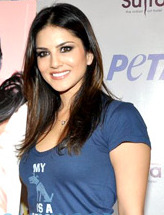
Leone at the PETA's stray dog adoption campaign

In 2004, Leone was part of No More Bush Girls, in which she and several other popular adult actresses shaved off their pubic hair in protest of the George W. Bush presidency. In May 2008, she shot a promotional video for Declare Yourself, a nonprofit, nonpartisan voter registration campaign targeting 18- to 29-year-olds. She indicated that Barack Obama would be her choice in the 2008 U.S. presidential election, primarily because she felt he was more business-friendly to the adult industry than his opponent John McCain. She also released a public service announcement on behalf of the ASACP, urging adult website webmasters to protect their sites from children by having an RTA label on it.

In 2013, Leone posed for a PETA ad campaign, encouraging dog and cat owners to have their pets spayed and neutered. In an interview for PETA India, Leone said, "I believe that every single dog should be spayed and neutered. You don't want to continue the cycle of homeless dogs or cats. And spaying and neutering also keeps them healthy." PETA named her their "Person of the Year" in 2016.

== Personal life ==
In June 2006, Leone became an American citizen, but stated she planned to remain a dual citizen of Canada. On April 14, 2012, she announced that she was now a resident of India, explaining in an interview to The New Indian Express that she was an Overseas Citizen of India for which she was eligible because her parents lived in India. She applied for it prior to filming Jism 2.

Leone is left handed.

Leone has a strong interest in health and fitness and has been featured in several mainstream fitness publications. Leone has modelled fitness clothing for the sports brand Fantasy Fitness and shared that she stays in shape by working out as much as she can despite her busy schedule, commenting in Men's Fitness magazine, "I try to eat very healthy – lots of vegetables, drinking milk every day."

A 2008 Eye Weekly article reported that "Leone does her best to maintain a link to Sikh traditions, even if more in theory than in practice. But she's unlikely to disavow her career path due to religion" and that Leone said "Girls will leave the industry claiming that they found God. Well, the fact is, God has always been with them the entire time." In a 2010 interview, she said

It's a community-based religion. You walk into a temple and you're greeted with the utmost respect... But, just like any religion it doesn't want you to shoot adult material. I mean, I grew up going to temple every Sunday. When my parents found out they knew my personality which was very independent. Even if they tried to stop me or tried to steer me the right way they would have lost their daughter. I'm too headstrong. And it wasn't a plan. It just happened and my career and everything just kept getting bigger and bigger.

A police first information report was filed against Leone in May 2015 after a woman at Mumbai, India, complained that Leone's website, sunnyleone.com, was destroying the Indian culture. Thane police's cyber cell at Ramnagar booked her for sections 292, 292A, 294, which could have landed her a term in jail, a fine, or both. Senior police inspector JK Sawant stated, "We cannot block the website, but will ask the operator to remove objectionable content."

=== Marriage and family ===
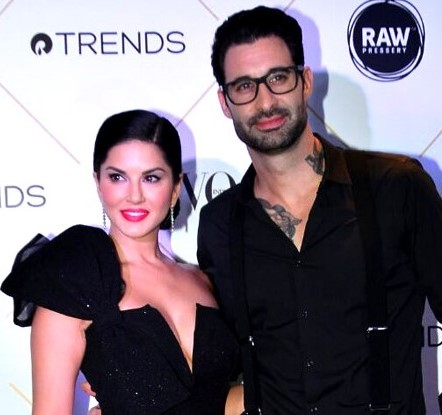
Leone and her husband Daniel Weber at Vogue Beauty Awards in 2017

Although bisexual, she has stated that she prefers men. Sunny Leone had dated Indian-Canadian stand-up comedian Russell Peters up until they broke up in 2007. Leone was then dating Matt Erikson, a vice-president of marketing at Playboy Enterprises. After being engaged to Erikson, they broke up in 2008. She mentioned in an interview at the start of 2011 that she was married to Daniel Weber, an American actor, producer, and entrepreneur. During her stay in the Bigg Boss house later that same year, Leone indicated that she had married, Leone said she "purposely arrived late" to their first date as she was not impressed with him, but he changed her mind by sending 24 roses to her hotel room.

In July 2017, Leone and her husband Daniel Weber adopted their first child from Latur, a village in Maharashtra. The baby girl, whom they named Nisha Kaur Weber, was 21 months old at the time of adoption. Actress Sherlyn Chopra confirmed the news by writing a congratulatory message on social media on July 20, 2017. "Never in my life did I think that I want to adopt a child. People doing such amazing work at the orphanage changed my mind," Daniel Weber told Hindustan Times.

On March 4, 2018, Leone and her husband announced the birth of their twin boys, born through surrogacy. They named the boys Asher Singh Weber and Noah Singh Weber.

Leone and her family moved into a new home in Mumbai, Maharashtra on Ganesh Chaturthi, which took place on September 13, 2018.

== Bibliography ==
- Sweet Dreams (2016)

== See also ==
- List of pornographic actors who appeared in mainstream films
- Pornography in India

1970s	Evelyn Treacher	Stephanie McLean	Tina McDowall	Patricia Barrett	Avril Lund
1970s	Anneka Di Lorenzo	Laura Bennett Doone	Victoria Lynn Johnson	Dominique Maure	Cheryl Rixon
1980s	Isabella Ardigo	Danielle Deneux	Corinne Alphen	Sheila Kennedy	Linda Kenton
1980s	None	Cody Carmack	Mindy Farrar	Patty Mullen	Ginger Miller
1990s	Stephanie Page	Simone Brigitte	Jisel	Julie Strain	Sasha Vinni
1990s	Gina LaMarca	Andi Sue Irwin	Elizabeth Ann Hilden	Paige Summers	Nikie St. Gilles
2000s	Juliet Cariaga	Zdeňka Podkapová	Megan Mason	Sunny Leone	Victoria Zdrok
2000s	Martina Warren	Jamie Lynn	Heather Vandeven	Erica Ellyson	Taya Parker
2010s	Taylor Vixen	Nikki Benz	Jenna Rose	Nicole Aniston	Lexi Belle
2010s	Layla Sin	Kenna James	Jenna Sativa	Gina Valentina	Gianna Dior
2020s	Lacy Lennon	Kenzie Anne	Amber Marie	Tahlia Paris	Renee Olstead
2020s	Kassie Wallis	-	-	-	-
