= List of Hindi films of 2012 =

List of Hindi films released in 2012

This is a list of Hindi films released in 2012.

== Box office collection ==
The 10 highest worldwide grossing Bollywood films of 2012 are as follows:

Rank	Title	Production company	Worldwide Gross
1	Ek Tha Tiger	Yash Raj Films	₹334.39 crore (US$62.58 million)
2	Dabangg 2	Eros International; Arbaaz Khan Productions; Stellar Films	₹255 crore (US$47.72 million)
3	Jab Tak Hai Jaan	Yash Raj Films	₹235 crore (US$43.98 million)
4	Rowdy Rathore	UTV Motion Pictures; Bhansali Productions	₹203.39 crore (US$38.06 million)
5.	Agneepath	Eros International; Dharma Productions	₹193 crore (US$36.12 million)
6	Barfi!	UTV Motion Pictures; Ishana Movies	₹175 crore (US$32.75 million)
7	Talaash: The Answer Lies Within	Reliance Entertainment; Aamir Khan Productions; Excel Entertainment	₹180.83 crore (US$33.84 million)
8	Housefull 2	Eros International; Nadiadwala Grandson Entertainment	₹179.15 crore (US$33.53 million)
9	Bol Bachchan	Fox Star Studios; Ajay Devgn FFilms; Shree Ashtavinayak Cine Vision; Shree Ashtavinayak LFS Infra	₹165.68 crore (US$31 million)
10	Son of Sardaar	Ajay Devgn FFilms; YRV Infra & Media; Viacom 18 Motion Pictures; Eros International	₹161.48 crore (US$30.22 million)

== January – March ==
Opening		Title	Director	Cast	Genre	Studio
J A N	6	Players	Abbas–Mustan	Vinod Khanna, Abhishek Bachchan, Bipasha Basu, Sonam Kapoor, Bobby Deol, Neil Nitin Mukesh, Sikander Kher, Omi Vaidya, Johnny Lever, Vyacheslav Razbegaev	Action/Thriller	Viacom18 Motion Pictures, Burmawala Bros.
J A N	13	Chaalis Chauraasi	Hriday Shetty	Naseeruddin Shah, Atul Kulkarni, Kay Kay Menon, Ravi Kishan	Comedy/Crime	
J A N	13	Ghost	Puja Jatinder Bedi	Shiney Ahuja, Sayali Bhagat, Deepraj Rana, Julia Bliss	Adult/Horror	
J A N	13	Sadda Adda	Muazzam Beg	Karanvir Sharma, Shaurya Chauhan, Bhaumik Sampat, Kahkkashan Aryan, Rohin Robert, Rohit Arora	Comedy	
J A N	26	Agneepath	Karan Malhotra	Hrithik Roshan, Sanjay Dutt, Rishi Kapoor, Priyanka Chopra, Om Puri, Zarina Wahab	Action/Drama	Eros International, Dharma Productions
F E B	3	Gali Gali Chor Hai	Rumi Jaffrey	Akshaye Khanna, Shriya Saran, Mugdha Godse, Satish Kaushik, Vijay Raaz	Drama	
F E B	3	Staying Alive	Anant Mahadevan	Anant Mahadevan, Saurabh Shukla, Chandan Roy Sanyal	Social	
F E B	3	Love You To Death	Rafeeg Ellias	Yuki Ellias, Chandan Roy Sanyal, Sheeba Chaddha, Suhasini Mulay	Comedy	
F E B	10	Ek Main Aur Ekk Tu	Shakun Batra	Kareena Kapoor, Imran Khan, Ratna Pathak Shah, Boman Irani, Ram Kapoor	Romance/Comedy	UTV Motion Pictures, Dharma Productions
F E B	10	Valentine's Night	Krishan Kumar	Payal Rohatgi, Sangram Singh, Rahul Minz, Neha Thakur	Adult/Romance/Thriller	
F E B	17	Ekk Deewana Tha	Gautham Vasudev Menon	Prateik Babbar, Amy Jackson, Manu Rishi, Ramesh Sippy, Sachin Khedekar	Romance	Fox Star Studios, Photon Kathaas Productions, RS Infotainment
F E B	17	?: A Question Mark	Allyson Patel; Yash Dave	Maanvi Gagroo, Akhlaque Khan, Yaman Chatwal, Varun Thakur, Chirag Jain, Sonam Mukherjee	Adult/Horror	
F E B	17	Married 2 America	Dilip Shankar	Jackie Shroff, Archana Joglekar, Anjali Malhotra, Shweta Tiwari, Raghubir Yadav, Chetan Pandit, Ashok Samarth, Akhilendra Mishra	Drama	
F E B	24	Jodi Breakers	Ashwini Chaudhary	R. Madhavan, Bipasha Basu, Milind Soman, Dipannita Sharma, Omi Vaidya, Mrinalini Sharma	Romance	
F E B	24	Tere Naal Love Ho Gaya	Mandeep Kumar	Riteish Deshmukh, Genelia D'Souza, Om Puri, Tinnu Anand	Romance/Comedy	UTV Motion Pictures, Tips Industries
M A R	2	London, Paris, New York	Anu Menon	Ali Zafar, Aditi Rao Hydari	Romance	Fox Star Studios, Rose Movies
M A R	2	Paan Singh Tomar	Tigmanshu Dhulia	Irrfan Khan, Mahie Gill, Vipin Sharma, Nawazuddin Siddiqui	Crime	UTV Spotboy, Tigmanshu Dhulia Films
M A R	2	Will You Marry Me?	Aditya Dutt	Shreyas Talpade, Rajeev Khandelwal, Tripta Parashar, Mugdha Godse, Celina Jaitly, Muzammil Ibrahim	Romance	
M A R	9	Kahaani	Sujoy Ghosh	Vidya Balan, Parambrata Chatterjee, Nawazuddin Siddiqui, Indraneil Sengupta, Saswata Chatterjee	Drama/Thriller	Viacom18 Motion Pictures, Pen Studios, Boundscript
M A R	9	Chaar Din Ki Chandni	Samir Karnik	Kulraj Randhawa, Tusshar Kapoor, Anupam Kher, Om Puri, Anita Raj	Comedy	Top Angle Productions
M A R	16	Say Yes to Love	Mahrukh Mirza Beg	Asad Mirza, Nazia Hussain, Aditya Raj Kapoor	Romance	
M A R	16	Akkad Bakkkad Bam Be Bo	Dweep Raj Kochhar	Dweep Raj Kochhar	Romance	
M A R	16	Zindagi Tere Naam	Ashu Trikha	Mithun Chakraborthy, Ranjeeta Kaur, Ashish Sharma	Romance	
M A R	23	Agent Vinod	Sriram Raghavan	Saif Ali Khan, Kareena Kapoor, Ram Kapoor, Prem Chopra, Adil Hussain, Ravi Kishan	Suspense/Thriller	Eros International, Illuminati Films
M A R	30	Blood Money	Vishal Mahadkar	Kunal Khemu, Amrita Puri, Manish Chaudhari, Puja Gupta	Thriller	Viacom18 Motion Pictures, Vishesh Films
M A R	30	Bumboo	Jagdish Rajpurohit	Sharat Saxena, Sanjay Mishra	Comedy	

== April – June ==
Opening		Title	Director	Cast	Genre	Studio
A P R	5	Housefull 2	Sajid Khan	Akshay Kumar, Asin, John Abraham, Jacqueline Fernandez, Riteish Deshmukh, Zareen Khan, Shreyas Talpade, Shazahn Padamsee, Chunky Pandey, Mithun Chakraborty, Rishi Kapoor, Randhir Kapoor, Boman Irani, Johnny Lever, Neelu Kohli, Suparna Marwah, Malaika Arora	Action comedy	Eros International, Nadiadwala Grandson Entertainment
A P R	13	Bittoo Boss	Supavitra Babul	Pulkit Samrat, Amita Pathak	Comedy	Viacom18 Motion Pictures, Wide Frame Pictures
A P R	13	Ab Hoga Dharna Unlimited	Deepak Tanwar	Saurabh Malik, Rekha Rana, Omkar Das Manikpuri	Drama	
A P R	20	Vicky Donor	Shoojit Sircar	Ayushmann Khurrana, Yami Gautam, Annu Kapoor, John Abraham	Comedy	Eros International, JA Entertainment, Rampage Motion Pictures, Rising Sun Films
A P R	20	Hate Story	Vivek Agnihotri	Paoli Dam, Gulshan Devaiah, Nikhil Dwivedi	Adult/Thriller	T-Series Films
A P R	20	Chhodo Kal Ki Baatein	Pramod Joshi	Sachin Khedekar, Aanjjan Srivastav, Atul Parchure, Anupam Kher	Comedy	
A P R	27	Tezz	Priyadarshan	Ajay Devgn, Anil Kapoor, Kangana Ranaut, Zayed Khan, Sameera Reddy, Boman Irani, Mohanlal, Mallika Sherawat	Action	Eros International, Venus Worldwide Entertainment, United 7 Entertainment
A P R	27	Life Ki Toh Lag Gayi	Rakesh Mehta	Ranvir Shorey, Kay Kay Menon, Manu Rishi, Rukhsar Rehman, Neha Bhasin	Comedy	
M A Y	4	Jannat 2	Kunal Deshmukh	Emraan Hashmi, Esha Gupta, Randeep Hooda	Crime/Thriller	Fox Star Studios, Vishesh Films
M A Y	4	Fatso!	Rajat Kapoor	Ranvir Shorey, Gul Panag, Purab Kohli	Comedy	Pritish Nandy Communications
M A Y	4	The Forest	Ashvin Kumar	Ankur Vikal, Nandana Sen, Jaaved Jaaferi	Horror	
M A Y	4	Love, Lies & Seeta	Chandra Pemmaraju	Melanie Kannokada, Arjun Gupta, Lavrenti Lopes	Comedy	
M A Y	11	Dangerous Ishq	Vikram Bhatt	Karisma Kapoor, Rajneesh Duggal, Jimmy Sheirgill, Divya Dutta	Romance/Thriller	Reliance Entertainment, Dar Motion Pictures, ASA Productions & Enterprises
M A Y	11	Chhota Bheem and the Curse of Damyaan	Rajiv Chilaka	Voice-over by Kaustav Ghosh, Rupa Bhimani	Animation	PVR Pictures, Green Gold Animation
M A Y	11	Ishaqzaade	Habib Faisal	Arjun Kapoor, Parineeti Chopra, Gauahar Khan	Romance	Yash Raj Films
M A Y	18	Department	Ram Gopal Varma	Amitabh Bachchan, Sanjay Dutt, Rana Daggubati, Anjana Sukhani, Lakshmi Manchu, Naseeruddin Shah	Adult/Action/Crime	Viacom18 Motion Pictures, Uberoi Line Productions, Wave Cinemas
M A Y	18	Mr. Bhatti on Chutti	Karan Razdan	Anupam Kher, Abid Ali	Comedy Film	
M A Y	25	Arjun: The Warrior Prince	Arnab Chaudhuri	Voice-over by Yuddvir Bakolia, Anjan Srivastav, Sachin Khedekar, Ila Arun, Vishnu Sharma	Computer-Animated	Walt Disney Pictures, UTV Motion Pictures
M A Y	25	MLA	Shiv Dube	Mukesh Tiwari, Omkar Das Manikpuri	Crime	
M A Y	25	Rakhtbeej	Anil Balani	Maanas Srivastavam, Sayantani Nandi	romantic comedy	
M A Y	25	Yeh Khula Aasmaan	Gitanjali Sinha	Raghubir Yadav, Yashpal Sharma	Romantic	
M A Y	25	Love, Wrinkle-free	Sandeep Mohan	Ash Chandler, Shernaz Patel	Adult/Romantic	
J U N	1	Rowdy Rathore	Prabhu Deva	Akshay Kumar, Sonakshi Sinha, Paresh Ganatra, Nassar	Action/comedy	UTV Motion Pictures, Bhansali Productions
J U N	8	Shanghai	Dibakar Banerjee	Emraan Hashmi, Abhay Deol, Kalki Koechlin, Prasenjit Chatterjee	Political/Thriller	PVR Pictures, DBP
J U N	15	Ferrari Ki Sawaari	Rajesh Mapuskar	Sharman Joshi, Boman Irani, Vidya Balan, Ritvik Sahore	Drama/Comedy	Eros International, Vinod Chopra Films
J U N	15	Qasam Se Qasam Se	Azim Rizvi	Faith, Rakhi Sawant, Satish Kaushik, Mukesh Tiwari, Omkar Das Manikpuri	Romance	
J U N	22	Teri Meri Kahaani	Kunal Kohli	Shahid Kapoor, Priyanka Chopra, Vrajesh Hirjee, Raj Singh Arora	Romance/Comedy	Eros International, Kunal Kohli Productions
J U N	22	Gangs of Wasseypur – Part 1	Anurag Kashyap	Manoj Bajpai, Nawazuddin Siddiqui, Piyush Mishra, Richa Chadda, Huma Qureshi, Reema Sen	Crime/Thriller	Viacom18 Motion Pictures, Tipping Point Films, AKFPL, Phantom Films, Elle Driver, Bohra Bros
J U N	29	Maximum	Kabeer Kaushik	Sonu Sood, Naseeruddin Shah, Neha Dhupia, Vinay Pathak	Thriller	

== July – September ==
Opening		Title	Director	Cast	Genre	Studio
J U L	6	Bol Bachchan	Rohit Shetty	Ajay Devgn, Abhishek Bachchan, Asin, Prachi Desai	Comedy/Action	Fox Star Studios, Ajay Devgn FFilms, Shree Ashtavinayak Cine Vision, Shree Ashtavinayak LFS Infra
J U L	6	3 Bachelors	Ajay Sinha	Sharman Joshi, Riya Sen, Raima Sen	Comedy	
J U L	13	Cocktail	Homi Adajania	Deepika Padukone, Saif Ali Khan, Diana Penty, Dimple Kapadia, Boman Irani, Randeep Hooda	Romance	Eros International, Illuminati Films, Maddock Films
J U L	20	Gattu	Rajan Khosa	Sarvasva, Mohammad Samad, Naresh Kumar	Children	
J U L	20	Challo Driver	Vickrant Mahajan	Kainaz Motivala, Vickrant Mahajan, Manoj Pahwa	Comedy	
J U L	20	Mere Dost Picture Abhi Baki Hai	Rajnish Raj Thakur	Suniel Shetty, Rajpal Yadav	Comedy	
J U L	27	Kyaa Super Kool Hain Hum	Sachin Yardi	Tusshar Kapoor, Riteish Deshmukh, Neha Sharma, Sarah-Jane Dias	Adult/Comedy	Balaji Motion Pictures, ALT Entertainment
J U L	27	Aalaap	Manish Manikpuri	Amit Purohit, Pitobash Tripathy, Gamya Wijayadasa, Rituparna Sengupta	Social	
J U L	27	Overtime	Ajay Yadav	Swati Sharma, Yashpal Sharma, Satish Kaushik	Drama	
A U G	3	Jism 2	Pooja Bhatt	Sunny Leone, Arunoday Singh, Randeep Hooda	Adult/Thriller	
A U G	3	Krishna Aur Kans	Vikram Veturi	Voice-over by Om Puri, Juhi Chawla, Manoj Bajpai, Anupam Kher, A. K. Hangal, Sachin Pilgaonkar, Supriya Pilgaonkar, Prachi Save	Computer-Animated	Reliance Animation
A U G	8	Gangs of Wasseypur – Part 2	Anurag Kashyap	Nawazuddin Siddiqui, Tigmanshu Dhulia, Piyush Mishra, Richa Chadda, Huma Qureshi, Reema Sen	Adult/Crime/Thriller	Viacom18 Motion Pictures, Tipping Point Films, AKFPL, Phantom Films, Bohra Bros
A U G	10	Paanch Ghantey Mien Paanch Crore	Faisal Saif	Meera, Abhishek Kumar, Kavita Radheshyam, Shawar Ali	Thriller	
A U G	15	Ek Tha Tiger	Kabir Khan	Salman Khan, Katrina Kaif, Ranvir Shorey, Girish Karnad	Romance/Action	Yash Raj Films
A U G	24	Shirin Farhad Ki Toh Nikal Padi	Bela Sehgal	Boman Irani, Farah Khan	Romance/Comedy	Eros International, Bhansali Productions
A U G	31	Joker	Shirish Kunder	Akshay Kumar, Sonakshi Sinha, Chitrangada Singh, Shreyas Talpade, Minissha Lamba	Drama	Hari Om Entertainment, UTV Motion Pictures, Three's Company Productions
A U G	31	Jalpari: The Desert Mermaid	Nila Madhab Panda	Rahul Singh, Suhasini Mulay, Lehar Khan, Harsh Mayar, Tannishtha Chatterjee, Parvin Dabas	Thriller/Social	Ultra Media & Entertainment
A U G	31	From Sydney with Love	Prateek Chakraborty	Sharad Malhotra, Prateek Chakraborty, Evelyn Sharma, Bidita Bag	Romantic	
A U G	31	I M 24	Saurabh Shukla	Ranvir Shorey, Neha Dhupia, Saurabh Shukla, Rajat Kapoor, Manjari Fadnis, Delnaaz Irani, Lillete Dubey, Karan Singh Grover	Comedy	Mirchi Movies, Planman Motion Pictures
S E P	7	Raaz 3: The Third Dimension	Vikram Bhatt	Emraan Hashmi, Bipasha Basu, Esha Gupta	Adult/Suspense/Thriller	Fox Star Studios, Vishesh Films
S E P	7	Chal Pichchur Banate Hain	Pritish Chakraborty	Rahil Tandon, Bhavna Ruparel	Comedy	
S E P	14	Barfi!	Anurag Basu	Ranbir Kapoor, Priyanka Chopra, Ileana D'Cruz	Romance/Comedy	UTV Motion Pictures, Ishana Movies
S E P	14	Jeena Hai Toh Thok Daal	Manish Vatsalya	Ravi Kishan, Yashpal Sharma, Govind Namdev, Hazel Crowney, Sharat Saxena	Drama	
S E P	21	Heroine	Madhur Bhandarkar	Kareena Kapoor, Arjun Rampal, Randeep Hooda, Mugdha Godse, Raqesh Bapat, Divya Dutta, Lillete Dubey	Adult/Drama	UTV Motion Pictures, Bhandarkar Entertainment
S E P	28	Kamaal Dhamaal Malamaal	Priyadarshan	Paresh Rawal, Om Puri, Nana Patekar, Shreyas Talpade, Rajpal Yadav, Nyra Banerjee	Comedy	Percept Pictures
S E P	28	OMG – Oh My God!	Umesh Shukla	Paresh Rawal, Akshay Kumar, Mithun Chakraborty, Nidhi Subbaiah, Lubna Salim, Prabhu Deva, Sonakshi Sinha	Comedy/Fantasy	Viacom18 Motion Pictures, Spice Studios, Grazing Goat Pictures, Wave Cinemas

== October – December ==
Opening		Title	Director	Cast	Genre	Studio
O C T	5	English Vinglish	Gauri Shinde	Sridevi, Priya Anand, Mehdi Nebbou, Amitabh Bachchan	Drama	Eros International, Hope Productions
O C T	5	Kismat Love Paisa Dilli	Sanjay Khanduri	Vivek Oberoi, Mallika Sherawat	Comedy	
O C T	12	Aiyyaa	Sachin Kundalkar	Rani Mukerji, Prithviraj Sukumaran	Rom-Com	Viacom18 Motion Pictures, AKFPL
O C T	12	Login	Sanjeev Reddy	Himansu Bhatt, Radhika Roy, Akkash Basant, Rashmi Gautam, Nandini Rai	Drama/Thriller	Cocktail Pictures
O C T	12	Chittagong	Bedabrata Pain	Manoj Bajpai, Vega Tamotia, Nawazuddin Siddiqui, Barry John	Drama	Bohra Bros
O C T	12	Bhoot Returns	Ram Gopal Verma	Manisha Koirala, J. D. Chakravarthy	Horror	Eros International, Alumbra Entertainment
O C T	19	Student of the Year	Karan Johar	Sidharth Malhotra, Alia Bhatt, Varun Dhawan, Rishi Kapoor	Romance/Comedy	Dharma Productions, Red Chillies Entertainment
O C T	19	Delhi Safari	Nikhil Advani	Voice-over by Akshaye Khanna, Suniel Shetty, Urmila Matondkar, Boman Irani, Govinda, Swini Khara	Computer Animated	Arc Entertainment, Applied Art Productions, Fantastic Films International, Krayon Pictures, Emmay Entertainment
O C T	24	Chakravyuh	Prakash Jha	Arjun Rampal, Abhay Deol, Esha Gupta, Manoj Bajpai, Kabir Bedi	Political Thriller	Eros International, Prakash Jha Productions
O C T	26	Ajab Gazabb Love	Sanjay Gadhvi	Jackky Bhagnani, Nidhi Subbaiah, Arjun Rampal, Darshan Jariwala, Kirron Kher	Comedy	Pooja Entertainment
O C T	26	Rush	Shamin Desai, Priyanka Desai	Emraan Hashmi, Neha Dhupia, Sagarika Ghatge, Aditya Pancholi	Thriller/Crime	
N O V	2	Luv Shuv Tey Chicken Khurana	Sameer Sharma	Kunal Kapoor, Huma Qureshi	Comedy	UTV Motion Pictures
N O V	2	1920: The Evil Returns	Bhushan Patel	Aftab Shivdasani, Tia Bajpai, Vidya Malvade	Horror	Reliance Entertainment, ASA Productions & Enterprises
N O V	2	Ata Pata Laapata	Rajpal Yadav	Rajpal Yadav, Ashutosh Rana, Asrani	Musical comedy	
N O V	2	Sons of Ram	Kushal Ruia	Voice over by Sunidhi Chauhan, Aditya Kapadia, Devansh Doshi, Saptharishi Ghosh	Animation/Drama/Children	
N O V	2	Future To Bright Hai Ji	Sanjay Amar	Aamir Bashir, Sonal Sehgal, Satish Kaushik	Drama	
N O V	13	Jab Tak Hai Jaan	Yash Chopra	Shah Rukh Khan, Katrina Kaif, Anushka Sharma	Romance/Drama	Yash Raj Films
N O V	13	Son Of Sardaar	Ashwni Dhir	Ajay Devgn, Sanjay Dutt, Juhi Chawla, Sonakshi Sinha	Comedy	Ajay Devgn FFilms, YRV Infra & Media, Viacom18 Motion Pictures, Eros International
N O V	30	Talaash: The Answer Lies Within	Reema Kagti	Aamir Khan, Rani Mukerji, Kareena Kapoor, Nawazuddin Siddiqui, Rajkumar Rao	Drama/Suspense	Reliance Entertainment, Aamir Khan Productions, Excel Entertainment
D E C	7	Khiladi 786	Ashish R Mohan	Akshay Kumar, Asin, Mithun Chakraborty, Raj Babbar, Himesh Reshammiya, Paresh Rawal	Action/Comedy	Hari Om Entertainment, Eros International, HR Musik
D E C	12	The Last Act	12 directors	Saurabh Shukla	Anthology	
D E C	14	Cigarette Ki Tarah	Akashaditya Lama	Bhoop Yaduvanshi, Prashant Narayanan, Madhurima Tuli, Sudesh Berry	Drama/Thriller	
D E C	21	Dabangg 2	Arbaaz Khan	Salman Khan, Sonakshi Sinha, Arbaaz Khan, Prakash Raj, Vinod Khanna	Action/Comedy	Eros International, Arbaaz Khan Production, Stellar Films

=== Other releases ===
The following films were also released in 2012, though the release date remains unknown.

Title	Cast	Notes	Ref.
Mysterious Girl	Uday Kiran, Venya	Delayed release	

== See also ==
- List of Bollywood films of 2013
- List of Bollywood films of 2011
