= List of Indian Bengali films of 2012 =

2012 Bengali films

A list of films produced by the Tollywood (Bengali language film industry) based in Kolkata in the year 2012.

== January–March ==
| Opening | | Title | Director | Cast | Genre |
|---|---|---|---|---|---|
| J A N U A R Y | 6 | Bedroom | Mainak Bhowmik | Rahul, Abir Chatterjee, Parno Mittra, Ushashie Chakraborty, Tanushree Chakraborty, Rudranil Ghosh | Drama |
| J A N U A R Y | 6 | Ek Je Chilo Bhooter Chana | Samar | Kuntal Pal, Prem, Manisha Das, Souvik Mahoto, Tapasi Bose, Mrinal Mukherjee, Tapati Sharma, Shibaji Bagchi, Satyen Chakraborty, Dipanjan Chakraborty | Fantasy Children |
| J A N U A R Y | 6 | Prem Bibhrat | Archan Chakraborty | June Maliah, Naina Das, Subhendu Chatterjee, Manoj Mitra, Chinmoy Roy | Romance Drama |
| J A N U A R Y | 13 | Khokababu | Shankar Aiyya | Dev, Subhashree, Ferdous, Laboni Sarkar, Biswajit Chakraborty, Aritra Dutta Banik | Romance |
| J A N U A R Y | 20 | 100% Love | Rabi Kinagi | Jeet, Koel Mallick, Supriya Dutta | Romance |
| J A N U A R Y | 20 | Aparajita Tumi | Aniruddha Roy Chowdhury | Prosenjit Chatterjee, Chandan Roy Sanyal, Padmapriya Janakiraman | Drama |
| F E B R U A R Y | 3 | Goray Gondogol | Aniket Chattopadhyay | Rahul, Sampurna, Rudranil Ghosh, Kharaj Mukherjee, Kanchan Mullick | Comedy |
| F E B R U A R Y | 10 | Chaal — The Game Begins | Alok Roy | Saheb Chattopadhyay, Pallabi Chattopadhyay, Tota Roy Chowdhury, Dolon Roy, Arunima Ghosh, Dulal Lahiri | Action |
| F E B R U A R Y | 17 | Nobel Chor | Suman Ghosh | Mithun Chakraborty, Saswata Chatterjee, Sudipta Chakraborty, Harsh Chhaya, Roopa Ganguly, Soumitra Chatterjee, Soma Chakraborty, Paran Bandyopadhyay, Arindam Sil, Shankar Debnath, Kaushik Ganguly | Suspense / Drama |
| F E B R U A R Y | 17 | Ek Tuku Chhoya Lage | - | Amitabh Bhattacharjee, Arnab, Ragini | Romance |
| F E B R U A R Y | 17 | Jaal | Amit Samanta | Tanveer, Pamela Mondal, Rohan, Victor Banerjee, Santu Mukhopadhyay, Sumanta Mukhopadhyay, Anuradha Ray, Silajit Majumder, Masud Akhtar | Drama |
| F E B R U A R Y | 24 | Flop-E | Pritam Sarkar | Sabyasachi Chakrabarty, Paoli Dam, Monika Chakraborty, Barun Chanda, Suvrojit, Saswati Guhathakurta, Srijit Mukherji, Sanjib Mukherjee | Drama |
| M A R C H | 2 | Charuulata 2011 | Agnidev Chatterjee | Rituparna Sengupta, Dibyendu, Arjun Chakraborty | Drama |
| M A R C H | 2 | Bhalobasa Off Route E | Arunava Khasnobis | Rahul, Saswata Chatterjee, Rudranil Ghosh, Abhiraj, Kharaj Mukherjee, Kanchan Mullick, Tanusree, Parijat, Partha Sarathi Deb, Padmanabha Dasgupta | Drama |
| M A R C H | 2 | Zameen | Sourav Mukhopadhyay | Supriya Devi, Dolon Roy, Dulal Lahiri | Drama |
| M A R C H | 2 | Atmatyag | Kumar Monojit | Chumki Chowdhury, Satinath Mukhopadhyay, Debika Mukhopadhyay, Dulal Lahiri, Sumit Gangopadhyay, Manoj Mitra | Drama |
| M A R C H | 9 | Macho Mustanaa | Reshmi Mitra | Hiran Chatterjee, Pooja Bose | Action Romance |
| M A R C H | 9 | Pather Sesh Kothay | Tanima Sen | Saheb Chattopadhyay, Chandreyee Ghosh, Krishna Kishor Mukhopadhyay, Soumitra Chatterjee, Gourab Chattopadhyay | Drama |
| M A R C H | 16 | Bhooter Bhabishyat | Anik Dutta | Sabyasachi Chakrabarty, Parambrata Chatterjee, Samadarshi Dutt, Swastika Mukherjee, Paran Bandyopadhyay, George Baker, Bibhu Bhattacharya, Sreelekha Mitra, Kharaj Mukherjee, Mumtaz Sorcar, Biswajit Chakraborty, Mir Afsar Ali, Manami Ghosh, Sumit Samaddar | Horror Drama Comedy |
| M A R C H | 16 | Hariye Jaai | Joy Mukherjee | Abhishek Chatterjee, Nibedita, Gargi Raychowdhury, Santana Bose, Anusuya Majumdar, Shankar Chakraborty, Kushal Chakraborty | Drama |
| M A R C H | 23 | Abar Byomkesh | Anjan Dutt | Abir Chatterjee, Saswata Chatterjee, Ushashie Chakraborty, Swastika Mukherjee | Detective |
| M A R C H | 23 | Bomkesh Bakshi (Adimripu) (Re-Release) | Anjan Dutt | Abir Chatterjee, Saswata Chatterjee, Rudranil Ghosh, Ushashie Chakraborty, Chandan Sen | Detective |
| M A R C H | 23 | Adhikar | Rajat Das | Amitabh Bhattacharjee | Drama |
| M A R C H | 30 | Amrita | Tapan Saha | Smriti Irani, Victor Banerjee, Sreya Pandey | Drama |
| M A R C H | 30 | Comeback | Pallab Kumar Ghosh | Rituparna Sengupta, Ferdous Ahmed, Anshuman | Drama |

== April–June ==
| Opening | | Title | Director | Cast | Genre |
|---|---|---|---|---|---|
| A P R I L | 13 | Le Halua Le | Raja Chanda | Mithun Chakraborty, Soham Chakraborty, Payel Sarkar, Hiran Chatterjee, Laboni Sarkar, Aritra Dutta Banik | Romance Comedy |
| A P R I L | 13 | Laptop | Kaushik Ganguly | Rahul Bose, Churni Ganguly, Saswata Chatterjee, Ananya Chatterjee, Kaushik Ganguly, Rajesh Sharma, Pijush Ganguly, Arindam Sil, Gaurav Chakrabarty, Ridhima Ghosh, Arun Guhathakurta, Aparajita Adhya, Anjana Basu, Jojo, Neha Kapoor, Indranil Banerjee, Pratyay Basu. | Drama |
| A P R I L | 13 | Ki Kore Bojhabo ...Tomake | Chaya Singh | Arjun Chakraborty, Chaya Singh, Tanveer Khan, Riwk, Payal, Joy Badlani | Thriller |
| A P R I L | 27 | 8:08 Er Bongaon Local | Debaditya | Raghubir Yadav, Tapas Paul, Soumitra Chatterjee, Swastika Mukherjee, Paoli Dam, Sonalee Chaudhuri | Drama |
| A P R I L | 27 | Hathat Sedin | Basu Chatterjee | Ferdous Ahmed | Drama |
| M A Y | 4 | Teen Yaari Katha | Sudeshna Roy & Abhijit Guha | Neel Mukherjee, Rudranil Ghosh, Parambrata Chatterjee, Gargi Roy Choudhuri, June Maliah, Rimjhim Mitra, Paoli Dam, Gita Dey, Biplab Chatterjee, Saswata Chatterjee | Comedy |
| M A Y | 11 | Elar Char Adhyay | Bappaditya Bandopadhyay | Paoli Dam, Indraneil Sengupta, Rudranil Ghosh, Bikram Chatterjee, Arunima Ghosh | Drama |
| M A Y | 11 | Hridoye Lekho Naam | Paritosh Das | Raj, Debomita, Arun Bandyopadhyay, Anuradha Ray, Rajat Ganguly, Rudranil Ghosh | Romance |
| M A Y | 24 | Kanchenjunga Express | Amab Ghosh | Mumtaz Sorcar, Sabyasachi Chakraborty | Suspense |
| M A Y | 25 | Bikram Singha | Rajib Biswas | Prosenjit Chatterjee, Richa Gangopadhyay | Action |
| M A Y | 25 | Koyekti Meyer Golpo | Subrata Sen | Raima Sen, Locket Chatterjee, Mumtaz Sorcar, Rii, Kanchana Moitra | Drama |
| M A Y | 25 | Jaaneman | Raja Chanda | Soham Chakraborty, Koel Mallick, Ashish Vidyarthi | Romance |
| J U N E | 1 | Mayabazaar | Joydeep Ghosh | Roopa Ganguly, Dhritiman Chaterji, Badshah Moitra | Drama |
| J U N E | 8 | Abhiman — Osthityer Lorai | Debanik Kundu | Arpita Chatterjee, Parambrata Chatterjee | Drama |
| J U N E | 22 | Hemlock Society | Srijit Mukherji | Koel Mallick, Parambrata Chatterjee, Roopa Ganguly, Dipankar Dey, Silajit Majumder, Soumitra Chatterjee, Sabitri Chattopadhyay, Sabyasachi Chakrabarty, Bratya Basu, Barun Chanda, Raj Chakraborty, Sudeshna Roy, Sohag Sen | Drama |
| J U N E | 29 | Om Shanti | Satabdi Roy | Victor Banerjee, Tapas Paul, Rituparna Sengupta, Kharaj Mukherjee, Rajesh Sharma | Drama |
| J U N E | 29 | Ullas | Ishwar Chakraborty | Tapas Paul, Satabdi Roy, Soumitra Chatterjee, Mahasweta Devi | Drama |
| J U N E | 29 | Haatchhani | Gourishankar Sarkhel | Rupsha, Subhasish Mukhopadhyay, Bhaskar Bandyopadhyay, Kharaj Mukherjee, Santana Bose, Bhola Tamang, Rana Pratap Bose, Ranajoy Bhattacharya | Horror |
| J U N E | 29 | Phire Eso Tumi | Asish Mitra | Badsha Moitra, Dulal Lahiri, Mrinal Mukherjee, Anup Sharma, Vivek Trivedi, Meghna Halder and Shakuntala Barua | Romance |
| J U N E | 29 | Bhallu Sardar | Debdut Ghosh | Biswajit Chakraborty, Satarupa Sanyal, Monami Ghosh, Kanchan Mullick, Supriyo Dutta, Priyanshu Chatterjee, Suhina, Debdut Ghosh | Children |

== July–September ==
| Opening | | Title | Director | Cast | Genre |
|---|---|---|---|---|---|
| J U L Y | 6 | Chhoan | Shibendu Guha Biswas | Rudranil Ghosh, Tanusree, Wriju Biswas, Siddhartha, Rhea Mukherjee, Sumanta Mukhopadhyay, Pramita Chatterjee | Romance |
| J U L Y | 13 | Awara | Rabi Kinagi | Jeet, Sayantika Banerjee, Ashish Vidyarthi, Mukul Dev, Kharaj Mukherjee | Action, Romance |
| J U L Y | 13 | Keno Mon Take Chay | Milan Bhowmick | Raaj, Rimjhim Mitra, Oindrila, Biplab Chatterjee, Arpita Baker, Mrinal Mukherjee | Romance |
| J U L Y | 20 | Life in Park Street | Raj Mukherjee | Soumitra Chatterjee, Debashree Roy, Rajesh Sharma, Dron Mukherjee, Shruti Bandyopadhyay | Drama |
| J U L Y | 27 | Darling | Raj Mukherjee | Mayukh Mazumder, Riya Chanda, Pamela Mondal, Aishwarya | Romance |
| J U L Y | 27 | Palatak | Nehal Dutta | Jayanto, Suchandra, Ferdous Ahmed, Shankar Chakraborty, Soumitra Chatterjee, Biswajit Chakraborty, Soma Dey, Ramen Raychowdhury, Biplab Ketan Chakraborty | Drama |
| A U G U S T | 3 | Muktodhara | Nandita Roy & Shiboprosad Mukherjee | Rituparna Sengupta, Nigel Akkara, Bratya Basu, Debshankar Haldar, Kharaj Mukherjee | Drama |
| A U G U S T | 17 | Shooter | Provash & Arijit | Joy, Sayantika, Ashish Vidyarthi | Drama |
| A U G U S T | 17 | Bhalobashar 2nd Marriage | Prashanta Bardhan | Sujjoy Ghosh, Poulomi, Haradhan Bandopadhyay, Deepankar De, Manoj Mitra, Subhashish Mukherjee | Romance/Comedy |
| A U G U S T | 20 | Se Amar Mon Kereche | Sohanur Rahman Sohan | Shakib Khan, Srabosti Dutta Tinni | Romance, Action |
| A U G U S T | 31 | Paglu 2 | Sujit Mondal | Dev, Koel Mallick | Romance / Drama |
| A U G U S T | 31 | Chitrangada | Rituparno Ghosh | Rituparno Ghosh, Jisshu Sengupta, Raima Sen, Dipankar Dey | Drama |
| S E P T E M B E R | 14 | Dashami | Suman Maitra | Indraneil Sengupta, Koel Mallick, Locket Chatterjee | Drama |
| S E P T E M B E R | 14 | Passport | Raj Mukherjee | Ferdous Ahmed, Gargi Raychowdhury, Rajesh Sharma | Drama |
| S E P T E M B E R | 14 | Love History | - | - | Romance |
| S E P T E M B E R | 21 | Abosheshey | Aditi Roy | Ankur Khanna, Raima Sen, Roopa Ganguly, Dipankar De, Manasi Sinha, Sudipta Chakraborty, Kamalika Bandyopadhyay, Suman Mukherjee, Abhijit Guha, Arijit Dutta | Drama |
| S E P T E M B E R | 21 | E Shudhu Amar Gaan | Shankar Ray | Raj, Santu Mukherjee, Biswajit Chakroborty, Dwijen Banerjee, Debdut Ghosh, Janiva Roy | Drama |
| S E P T E M B E R | 28 | Accident | Nandita Roy & Shiboprosad Mukherjee | Rudranil Ghosh, Shiboprosad Mukherjee, Sampurna Lahiri, Debshankar Haldar, Kharaj Mukherjee, Sankarshan Das, Kanchana Moitra | Drama |

== October–December ==
| Opening | | Title | Director | Cast | Genre |
|---|---|---|---|---|---|
| O C T O B E R | 5 | Ekla Akash | Sandipan Roy | Parambrata Chatterjee, Gautam Ghose, Parno Mittra, Rudranil Ghosh | Drama |
| O C T O B E R | 5 | Shudhu Tomake Chai | Rudranil Chowdhury | Soumili Biswas, Bhaswar, Mumtaz Sorcar, Tilottama Dutta, Shaheb Chatterjee | Romance / Drama |
| O C T O B E R | 5 | Ragging | Anup Shankar Saha & Bikash Banerjee | Vik, Olivia, Subhomoy Chowdhury, Rana Mukhkopadhyay, Koushik Dutta | Drama |
| O C T O B E R | 19 | Challenge 2 | Raja Chanda | Dev, Pooja Bose, Kharaj Mukherjee | Action |
| O C T O B E R | 19 | Paanch Adhyay | Pratim D. Gupta | Dia Mirza, Priyanshu Chatterjee, Soumitra Chatterjee | Romance / Drama |
| O C T O B E R | 19 | Astra | Tathagata Bhattacharjee | Joy, Samapika, Soumitra Chatterjee, Rajesh Sharma | Action / Drama |
| N O V E M B E R | 2 | 3 Kanya | Agnidev Chatterjee | Rituparna Sengupta, Ananya Chatterjee, Unnati Davara, Rajatava Dutta, Sudip Mukherjee, Biplab Chatterjee | Thriller |
| N O V E M B E R | 2 | Borolar Ghor | Mani C. Kappan | Utpal Das, Debasmita Banerjee | Romance |
| N O V E M B E R | 9 | Prem Leela | Goutam Majumder | Trambak Roy Chowdhury, Taniska, Rajatava Dutta, Biswajit Chakraborty | Romance |
| N O V E M B E R | 14 | Idiot | Rajib Biswas | Ankush Hazra, Srabanti, Aditya Pancholi | Romance |
| N O V E M B E R | 16 | Na Hannyate | Riingo Banerjee | Roopa Ganguly, Dibyendu Mukherjee, Sayani Dutta, Rahul, Priyanka Sarkar, Chaiti Ghosal, Deb Shankar Halder | Drama |
| N O V E M B E R | 23 | Dutta Vs Dutta | Anjan Dutt | Anjan Dutt, Ronodeep Bose, Arpita Chatterjee, Roopa Ganguly, Rita Kayral, Parno Mittra, Dipankar De, Shankar Chakraborty, Biswajit Chakraborty, Kaushik Sen, Subhasish Mukherjee, Srijit Mukherji, Manasi Sinha, Debranjan Nag, Pradip Ray, Somak Ghosh | Drama |
| N O V E M B E R | 30 | Tabe Tai Hok | Sougata Ray Barman | Joy Sengupta, Swastika Mukherjee, Samadarshi Dutta | Drama |
| N O V E M B E R | 30 | Sector 5 | Souradip Banerjee | Rajatava Dutta, Barun Chanda, Apala Pal, Arijit Dutta, Suman haldar, Shamal saha | Drama |
| N O V E M B E R | 30 | From Headquarters | Debabrata Roy | Abhishek Chatterjee, Locket Chatterjee, Chandan Sen, Anindya Banerjee, Sourav | Drama |
| D E C E M B E R | 7 | Bapi Bari Jaa | Sudeshna Roy and Abhijit Guha | Arjun Chakrabarty, Mimi Chakraborty, Shalmi Barman, Anindya Chatterjee, Dhruva Lal, Tista Dutta | Drama |
| D E C E M B E R | 7 | Tor Naam | Jaya Shankar | Gaurav, Swati, Victor Banerjee, Sabyasachi Chakrabarty, Mithu Chakraborty, Kharaj Mukherjee, Mousami Saha, Tota Roy Choudhury, Suman Banerjee | Romance/Drama |
| D E C E M B E R | 7 | Chupkatha | Souvick Sarkar and Dipankar | Payel Roy, Silajit Majumder, Aparajita Auddy, Bhaswar Chattopadhyay | Drama |
| D E C E M B E R | 14 | Balukabela.com | Partha Sen | Parambrata Chattopadhyay, Locket Chatterjee, Payel Sarkar, Ambalika, Taniya, Indranil, Abhiraj, Rudranil Ghosh, Rahul, Bratya Basu, Saswata Chatterjee, Paran Bandopadhyay, Sudipa Basu | Comedy |
| D E C E M B E R | 14 | Antore Bahire | Somnath Sen | Abhiraj, Moubani Sorcar, Debashree Roy, Abhishek Chatterjee | Drama |
| D E C E M B E R | 21 | Jekhane Bhooter Bhoy | Sandip Ray | Paran Bandopadhyay, Abir Chatterjee, Bhaswar Chatterjee, Saswata Chatterjee | Comedy |
| D E C E M B E R | 28 | Bojhena Shey Bojhena | Raj Chakraborty | Soham Chakraborty, Payel Sarkar, Abir Chatterjee, Mimi Chakraborty | Romance/Drama |
| D E C E M B E R | 28 | Bawali Unlimited | Sujit Mondal | Payel Sarkar, Sabyasachi Chakrabarty, Rajatava Dutta, Joy, Sourav | Romance Comedy |
| D E C E M B E R | 28 | Gundaraj | Sanjay Banerjee | Raja Goswami, Megha, Bodhisattwa Majumdar, Anuradha Ray, Kalyani Mondal, Koushik Bandyopadhyay, Jayanta Dutta Burman, Anamika Saha, Shakti Kapoor, Sambhavana Sheth | Action |
| D E C E M B E R | 31 | Khasi Katha- A Goat Saga | Judhajit Sarkar | Naseeruddin Shah, Anindita Bose | Drama |

- ems.
