= June Banerjee =

Indian and Bengali singer

- Occupation: Singer

June Banerjee is an Indian and Bengali singer who has sung in the films like Khokababu, Lorai etc. She was the singer of the popular Bengali song Soniye Tu Janiye Tu, Laila Laila. June started her singing career by singing ad jingles. Later she got her first break in the film Chirodini Tumi Je Amar (2008).

== Bengali playback songs ==
Denotes films that have not yet been released

Year	Albums	Song name(s)	Co-singer(s)	Music director(s)	Lyrics(s)	Notes
2006	Ghatak	"Ei Neel Sagarer Pare"	Shaan	Jeet Gannguli	Priyo Chattopadhyay	
2008	Chirodini Tumi Je Amar	Batashe Gungun	Jeet Gannguli	Jeet Gannguli	Priyo Chattopadhyay	
2008	Chirodini Tumi Je Amar	U la lla I love my soniya (Female)	Solo	Jeet Gannguli	Priyo Chattopadhyay	
2008	Chirodini Tumi Je Amar	Jhiri Jhiri	Solo	Jeet Gannguli	Priyo Chattopadhyay	
2008	Mon Mane Na	Mon Mane Na	Zubeen Garg	Jeet Gannguli	Priyo Chattopadhyay	
2008	Mon Mane Na	Chupi Chupi Bhalobasa	Shaan	Jeet Gannguli	Gautam Sushmit	
2009	Challenge	Dekhechi Tomake Srabone	Shaan	Jeet Gannguli	Priyo Chattopadhyay	
2009	Paran Jai Jaliya Re	Mon Jaane	Shaan	Jeet Gannguli	Gautam Sushmit	
2009	Prem Aamar	Prem Amar	Kunal Ganjawala	Jeet Gannguli	Priyo Chattopadhyay	
2009	Amar Sangee	"Tumi Samne Acho"	Soham Chakraborty	Babul Bose		
2009	Amar Sangee	"O Golap Tumi Aaj Gondho Dio"	Soham Chakraborty	Babul Bose		
2009	Amar Sangee	"Premer Agun Jolchhe Buke"	Shaan	Babul Bose		
2010	Le Chakka	Ua Ua Ee	Shaan	Indraadip Das Gupta	Priyo Chattopadhyay, Prasenjit Mukherjee, Srijato	
2010	Dui Prithibi	O Yaara Ve	Kunal Ganjawala, Bonnie Chakraborty, Monali Thakur	Jeet Gannguli	Prasen (Prasenjit Mukherjee)	
2010	Shedin Dekha Hoyechilo	Hetechi Swapner Haat Dhore	Javed Ali, Dipayan Dasgupta	Jeet Gannguli	Chandrani Gannguli or Prasen (Prasenjit Mukherjee)	
2010	Mon Je Kore Uru Uru	Mon Je Kore Uru Uru	Kunal Ganjawala	Jeet Gannguli	Prasen (Prasenjit Mukherjee)	
2011	Shotru	Jwaliye Puriye	Timir Biswas	Indradeep Dasgupta	Srijato	
2011	Bindas Prem	Ei Duniyai Koto Kichi Hoy	Soham Chakraborty			
2011	Tomay Bhalobasi	Ore Road Romeo	Shaan			
2011	Best Friend	Tomar Chokhe Aami Je	Kunal Ganjawala			
2011	Best Friend	Mon Jane Aaj Prane	Saptak Bhattacharjee			
2011	Dujone Milbo Abaar	Hatke Hatke	Sujoy Bhowmik			
2012	Khokababu	Soniye Tu Janiye Tu	Zubeen Garg	Priyo Chatterjee	Gautam Sushmit	
2012	Chaya Chobi	HIJIBIJI		Arfin Rumey	Marzuk Russell	Unreleased
2012	Shooter	Pinjore Pushe Rakha Bhalobasa	Kunal Ganjawala			
2012	Darling	Tomar Misti Misti Haasi	Shaan	Subhayu Bedajna		
2012	Tor Naam	Tor Naam (Female)	Solo	Akassh		
2012	Haatchhani	Pagol E Ki Hawa Chale	Solo	Dilip Das		
2012	Phire Eso Tumi	Kichhu Chupi Chupi Katha	Zubeen Garg			
2012	Ki Kore Bojhabo Tomake	Tumi Aamar Niswashe	Kumar Sanu	Ashok Bhadra		
2012	Ki Kore Bojhabo Tomake	Kaal Ki Hobe Keu Jaane Naa	Robi Choudhury	Ashok Bhadra		
2012	Om Shanti	Chhoan Chhui Hoye Gelo		Bappi Lahiri		
2012	Passport	Aaj Chokhe Chokhe	Kunal Ganjawala	Subhayu Bedajna		
2012	Bawali Unlimited	Mon Ure Chole	Kunal Ganjawala, Shaan	Dev Sen		
2012	Bawali Unlimited	Strawberry	Rana Mazumdar, Shaan	Savvy Gupta		
2012	Kayekti Meyer Golpo	Ei Shahore Aaj Aamar				
2012	Kayekti Meyer Golpo	Ei Shahore Aaj Aamar				
2013	Kolkata...The Metro Life	Kichhu Alo	Babul Supriyo			
2013	Premleela	Prem Jala	Kunal Ganjawala			
2013	Aborto	Pore Ei Mon	Solo			
2013	Har Mana Har	Mon Bole Kono Kotha	Solo			
2013	Amar Bodyguard	Pote Gechhe	Shaan, Javed Ali, Titas, Trijoy Dey	Samir Somu		
2013	Amar Bodyguard	Duru Duru Kape	Shaan	Samir Somu		
2013	Kanamachi	Dil Darodiya	Zubeen Garg	Rishi Chanda	Prasen	
2013	Lattoo	Mamo Chitte Niti Nritye	Zubeen Garg			
2013	Holud Pakhir Dana	Aami Aami	Shaan	Surojit Chatterjee		
2013	Holud Pakhir Dana	Aami Aami - Female	Solo	Surojit Chatterjee		
2013	Chupi Chupi	I am in Love	Shaan	Goutam Ganguly	Goutam Susmit	
2013	Chupi Chupi	Thodi Thodi Mulakatein	Kunal Ganjawala	Goutam Ganguly	Goutam Susmit	
2013	Megh Roddur	Kasha Kai		Rishi Chanda		
2013	Deewana	De Signal	Zubeen Garg	Dev Sen	Prasenjit Mallick	
2013	Golemale Pirit Koro Na	Ding Dong	Mallar Karmakar	Akassh		
2013	Loveria	36 24 36	Samidh Mukherjee	Samidh Mukherjee		
2024	Khadaan	"Haye Re Biye"	Abhijeeet Bhatacharya, Sudip Nandy	Nilayan Chatterjee	Nilayan Chatterjee	

== Hindi playback songs ==
Denotes films that have not yet been released

Year	Albums	Song name(s)	Co-singer(s)	Music director(s)	Lyrics(s)	Notes
2010	Gumshuda	Kisne Pehchana	Solo	Bickram Ghosh		
2011	Chalo Dilli	Laila O Laila	Solo	Gourov Dasgupta	Shashant Shah	
2011	Tum Hi To Ho	Rock You Baby	Arun Bakshi			
2013	Bloody Isshq	Hawa Lagi Hai	Javed Ali	Ashok Bhadra		

== Singles ==
Year	Song name	Co-singer(s)	Music director(s)	Lyrics(s)	Notes
2023	Chal Chalen Aashman Pe	Rangon	Rangon	Shiv	

== See also ==
- Chirodini Tumi Je Amar
- Khokababu
