= Aparajita Tumi =

2012 film by Aniruddha Roy Chowdhury

- Film poster
- Directed by: Aniruddha Roy Chowdhury
- Written by: Shyamal Sengupta
- Produced by: Shoojit Sircar; Ronnie Lahiri
- Starring: Padmapriya Janakiraman; Prosenjit Chatterjee; Kamalinee Mukherjee; Chandan Roy Sanyal; Indraneil Sengupta; Tanusree Shankar; Kalyan Ray; Rik Dev Mukherji
- Cinematography: Ranjan Palit
- Edited by: Arghyakamal Mitra
- Music by: Shantanu Moitra
- Distributed by: Rising Sun Films
- Release date: 20 January 2012
- Running time: 128 minutes
- Country: India
- Language: Bengali

Aparajita Tumi (English: You, Undefeated) is a 2012 Indian Bengali-language drama film directed by Aniruddha Roy Chowdhury. The film stars Prosenjit Chatterjee, Kamalinee Mukherjee, Padmapriya Janakiraman, Chandan Roy Sanyal, and Indraneil Sengupta. It is a venture of director Aniruddha Roy Chowdhury after his successful and critically acclaimed movie Antaheen. This film also had Shantanu Moitra as the music director and Anindya and Chandril as lyricists like Tony's previous film. The film is an adaptation of the novel Dui Nari Hathe Tarbari by famous Bengali writer Sunil Gangopadhyay.

== Plot ==
Pradip and Kuhu, an NRI couple with two children, start having problems because of Kuhu's straightforward nature and blatant comments which end up hurting people. Ushoshi and Ronojoy are another couple. While Ronojoy seems to be a cynical workaholic who is not bothered about the voids in his life, Ushoshi is extremely sensitive about things like their childlessness. As Kuhu repeatedly hurts the insecure Ushoshi, Pradip finds himself empathizing with her, and they eventually end up having an affair. Kuhu moves out with her children, whom she temporarily places in the care of her parents, while she takes time to think about her next step. Meanwhile, she has a brief encounter with ex-boyfriend Yusuf, which brings back nostalgic memories, pain and loneliness. While Yusuf is clearly interested in a relationship, Kuhu is cold and distant, which finally drives him away.

Meanwhile, Pradip suffers from splitting headaches, and it is soon discovered that he has cancer. As he battles the disease, Kuhu finally comes back, perhaps forgiving him. Ushoshi's husband learns of her affair with Pradip, and profoundly eccentric and cynical as he is, he sets her free to choose what she wants to do next without complaint. Ushoshi comes to visit Pradip, and Kuhu behaves quite normally with her, attempting to brush aside any bitterness. Ushoshi says that she has decided to return to India, and leaves without saying goodbye to Pradip.

In the end, Kuhu is seen alone on a beach, clutching a book of poems Yusuf had presented her, and along with that, she holds a letter he had left her, mentioning how he was going away, not willing to disturb her anymore.

== Cast ==
- Padmapriya Janakiraman as Kuhu
- Prosenjit Chatterjee as Pradip
- Kamalinee Mukherjee as Ushashi
- Chandan Roy Sanyal as Ranojoy
- Indraneil Sengupta as Yusuf
- Tanusree Shankar as Kuhu's mother
- Kalyan Ray as Kuhu's uncle
- Soumitra Chatterjee in a guest appearance as himself
- Emielyn Das as Pradip's daughter, Chandra
- Rik Dev Mukherji as Robi

== Soundtrack ==
The song Roopkathara was a chart topper and received rave reviews from the audience.

All music is composed by Shantanu Moitra.

Songs
| No. | Title | Lyrics | Singer(S) | Length |
|---|---|---|---|---|
| 1. | "Roopkathara (Female)" | Anindya Chattopadhyay & Chandril Bhattacharya | Shreya Ghoshal |
| 2. | "Roopkathara (Male)" | Anindya Chattopadhyay & Chandril Bhattacharya | Rupankar Bagchi |
| 3. | "Bola Baron" | Anindya Chattopadhyay & Chandril Bhattacharya | Anindya Chatterjee and Shantanu Moitra |
| 4. | "Brishti Biday" | Anindya Chattopadhyay, Chandril Bhattacharya | Shreya Ghoshal, Hamsika Iyer |
| 5. | "Take Me Home" | | Bonnie Chakraborty, Shreya Ghoshal |
| 6. | "Chhaya Bhitu Chhaya" | | Hamsika Iyer |
| 7. | "Shadow Tales" | Anindya Chattopadhyay, Chandril Bhattacharya & Neha Rungta | Suraj Jagan and Monali Thakur |

== Awards ==
| Ceremony | Category | Nominee | Result |
|---|---|---|---|
| 2nd Royal Stag Mirchi Music awards Bangla | Song Of The Year | Roopkathara (Female) | Won |
| 2nd Royal Stag Mirchi Music awards Bangla | Female Vocalist of the Year | Shreya Ghoshal for the song Roopkathara (Female) | Won |
| 2nd Royal Stag Mirchi Music awards Bangla | Music Director of the Year | Shantanu Moitra for the song Bola Baron | Won |
| 2nd Royal Stag Mirchi Music awards Bangla | Album of the Year | Aparajita Tumi | Won |
| 2nd Royal Stag Mirchi Music awards Bangla | Lyricist Of The Year | Anindya Chatterjee & Chandril Bhattacharya for the song Bola Baron | Won |

Padmapriya Nominated for National Award for Best Actress Category

== See also ==
- Bengali films of 2012
