= Maharashtra College of Arts, Science and Commerce =

College affiliated with the University of Mumbai

- Type: Public
- Established: 1968; 58 years ago
- Founders: Rafiq Zakaria
- Academic affiliations: University of Mumbai, Maharashtra State Board of Secondary and Higher Secondary Education
- Principal: Dr Sirajuddin H Chougle
- Location: Mumbai, Maharashtra, India; 18.9679°N 72.8267°E
- Website: maharashtracollege.org

Maharashtra College of Arts, Science and Commerce (informally Maharashtra College) is a college affiliated with the University of Mumbai offering undergraduate and postgraduate degrees in arts, science and commerce. It is located near Nagpada, Mumbai.

The college offers junior college and degree college courses.

== History ==
The college was founded in 1968. It is managed by the Khairul Islam Higher Education Society, which was founded by educationist Rafiq Zakaria.

The college was the first educational institutes in South Mumbai and one of the first institutes in the state of Maharashtra to power its electricity requirements completely from solar energy.
