= Nanu Ki Jaanu =

- Directed by: Faraz Haider
- Screenplay by: Manu Rishi
- Story by: Mysskin
- Based on: Pisaasu (2014)
- Produced by: PVR Pictures; Sajid Qureshi
- Starring: Abhay Deol; Patralekha; Manu Rishi
- Cinematography: S. R. Sathish Kumar
- Edited by: Manan Ajay Sagar
- Music by: Songs; Sajid–Wajid; Jeet Gannguli; Gunwant Sen; Bubli Huque-Meera; Sachin Gupta; Score; Dhruv Dhalla
- Production company: Inbox Pictures
- Distributed by: PVR Pictures
- Release date: 20 April 2018
- Running time: 133 minutes
- Country: India
- Language: Hindi
- Budget: ₹15 crore
- Box office: ₹4.12 crore

Nanu Ki Jaanu (transl. Nanu's Janu) is a 2018 Indian Hindi-language horror comedy film directed by Faraz Haider, starring Abhay Deol and Patralekha. The first look poster was launched on 23 March 2018 followed by its theatrical trailer on 26 March 2018. Nanu Ki Jaanu was released on 20 April 2018. The movie is a remake of 2014 Tamil movie Pisaasu.

== Plot ==
Anand is a land mafia agent in Delhi, who with his gang of 4 others scares property owners and acquires their apartments illegally. While on his way to make another deal, he stops to see an accident, and a girl Siddhi lying on road with a pool of blood. Nanu sees her alive and rushes her to the hospital, but she dies. Nanu get very disturbed as he saw her dying in front of him. He is not able to concentrate on anything or is able to make more deals. He is made fun by his friends for his weird behavior. Siddhi becomes a ghost and stays in Anand's apartment. It is shown that Siddhi's father stores her corpse in a freezer as he loved her immensely. She troubles Anand and his friends. She gets into bodies of people around him and roams around.Though, initially horrified and bugged by Siddhi's ghost later Nanu realizes that the ghost loves him and doesn't mean to harm him or his people at all.Eventually he develops a soft corner for her and feels for her. Because of this, he decides to find the person who hit Siddhi during that road accident.But, After a series of events, he realizes that it was he who had hit Siddhi from behind.Angry upon himself he goes to tell this to Siddhi's father, however Siddhi's ghost try to stop him but for the first time he tells her that he also loves her and asks her father to kill him. Listening this Siddhi's ghost breaks out of the freezer and re enters her body to communicate two things to Nanu and her father.She tells Nanu that he should overcome his guilt of killing her as it was prewritten and couldn't be prevented.And, she requests her father that Nanu is a nice guy and should be spared to which her father agrees. She requests him to let her go and not to keep her body anymore so that she can reincarnate and not roam as a ghost forever. She hugs Nanu and leaves eventually into a bright light.

== Cast ==
- Abhay Deol as Anand (Nanu)
- Patralekha as Siddhi (Jaanu)
- Brijendra Kala as Mr. Kumar
- Manu Rishi as Dabbu
- Rajesh Sharma as Bhaali, Siddhi's Father
- Himani Shivpuri as Nanu's mother
- Manoj Pahwa as Muslim Man
- Shreya Narayan as Ghostbuster
- Shefali Rana as Gayatri
- Chirag Sethi as Udhariya
- Gurmeet Singh as Yahoo
- Sameer Siddiquei as Mohit Dagar
- Adithi Kalkunte as Dagar's Wife
- Reshma Khan as Promila
- Spandan Chaturvedi as Phantom
- Vivek Rana as Chimney-engineer
- Sapna Chowdhary as an item number "Tere Thumke Sapna Choudhary"

== Soundtrack ==
Nanu Ki Jaanu

Soundtrack album by Sajid–Wajid, Jeet Gannguli, Gunwant Sen, Sachin Gupta and Babli Huque-Meera
- Released: 16 April 2018
- Recorded: 2017–2018
- Genre: Feature film soundtrack
- Length: 20:25
- Language: Hindi
- Label: T-Series
External audio
- Audio Jukebox on YouTube

Singles from Nanu Ki Jaanu
- 1. "Tere Thumke Sapna Choudhary" Released: 3 April 2018; 2. "Bhoot Aaya" Released: 11 April 2018

The music of the film is composed by Sajid–Wajid, Jeet Gannguli, Gunwant Sen, Sachin Gupta and Babli Huque-Meera while lyrics were written by Abid Ali, Danish Sabri, Sonu Saggu, Sajid Qureshi and Sachin Gupta. The first song of the film, Tere Thumke Sapna Choudhary which is sung by Gunwant Sen, Khushboo Jain and Saumya Upadhyay was released on 21 March 2018. The second single to be released was Bhoot Aaya which is by Mika Singh and rapped by Fazilpuria and was released on 11 April 2018. The soundtrack was released by T-Series on 16 April 2018.

Track listing
No.	Title	Lyrics	Music	Singer(s)	Length
1.	"Tere Thumke Sapna Choudhary"	Abid Ali	Gunwant Sen	Gunwant Sen, Khushboo Jain, Saumya Upadhyay	3:15
2.	"Bhoot Aaya"	Sajid Qureshi, Sachin Gupta	Sachin Gupta	Mika Singh (Rap: Fazilpuria)	4:20
3.	"Tujhe Dekhti Hai Nazar"	Abid Ali	Gunwant Sen	Mohammed Irfan	5:10
4.	"Kali Choti"	Sonu Saggu	Babli Huque-Meera	Aman Trikha, Yashraj Kapil, Saumya Upadhyay	3:31
5.	"Jai Mata Di"	Danish Sabri	Sajid–Wajid	Javed Ali, Alamgir Khan	4:09
Total length:					20:25

== Critical reception ==
Reza Noorani of The Times of India gave the film a rating of 2.5 out of 5 saying that, "While the story is unique and interesting, the execution is flawed, especially when it comes to the horror elements." Saibal Chatterjee of NDTV gave the film a rating of 1 out of 5 and said that, "The spirits of two much-abused genres – horror and comedy – are given an unceremonious burial in Nanu Ki Jaanu, a heavy-handed jumble that is both horrific and funny, neither of which is remotely intentional." Rohit Vats of Hindustan Times gave the film a rating of 1.5 out of 5 and said that, "Nanu Ki Jaanu is 132-minute of convoluted chaos. Some talented actors are wasted and some are given a free run to waste their talent." Nandini Ramnath of Scroll gave the film a rating of 1 out of 5 and said that, "Faraz Haider’s remake of the Tamil movie ‘Pisaasu’ works very hard to scare viewers away." Anna MM Vetticad of First Post criticized the film saying that, "Abhay Deol is uninspired at best in this loosely handled, low-IQ mess" and gave the film a rating of 1 out of 5.

Bollywood Hungama criticized the film, which is a remake of Tamil film Pisaasu, for being a poor adaptation saying that, "The adaptation by Manu Rishi Chadha is very poor. Manu Rishi Chadha’s screenplay is very weak and only a few moments stand out." The critic concluded the review by saying that, "On the whole, Nanu Ki Jaanu is an extremely poor show." and gave the film a rating of 1.5 out of 5. Shubhra Gupta of The Indian Express gave the film a rating of 1 out of 5 saying that, "Nanu Ki Jaanu is so all-out scatter-brained and lame, that we are left wincing rather than laughing." Sameeksha of News18 gave the film a rating of 1.5 out of 5 and concluding her review by saying that, "Overall the film is uneven, half-baked disappointment, which completely wrecks the talent of Abhay, Patralekha and even Chadha. They all deserve better than this." Mayank Shekhar of Mid-Day gave the film a rating of 1 out of 5 and said that, "Suffice it to say, by the end of Nanu Ki Jaanu, pretty much everyone in my theatre (me included) were essentially laughing at the film, rather than with it". Namrata Joshi of The Hindu criticized the film saying that, "Not quite supernatural thriller, Abhay Deol’s latest is plain dull."
