= Fatima Zakaria =

Indian journalist (1936–2021)

- Born: 17 February 1936; Bombay, British India
- Died: 6 April 2021 (aged 85); Aurangabad, India
- Education: Isabella Thoburn College
- Spouse: Rafiq Zakaria
- Children: 4, including Fareed Zakaria
- Relatives: Asif Zakaria (nephew); Arif Zakaria (nephew)
- Awards: Padma Shri (2006)

Fatima Zakaria (17 February 1936 – 6 April 2021) was the editor of the Mumbai Times, and later the Sunday editor of The Times of India. She also served as the editor of the Taj magazine of the Taj Hotels.

== Career ==
In 1958, she established an institution of childcare and a Women's Industrial Home in Mumbai that fulfilled the educational and healthcare needs of over 500 underprivileged children.

In 1963, Zakaria began her career in journalism as a children's columnist in The Illustrated Weekly of India and worked as Khushwant Singh's assistant editor. She joined The Times of India in 1970 and rose through the ranks to become Sunday edition editor. As the editor, she interviewed prominent figures like Indira Gandhi, Margaret Thatcher, J.R.D. Tata, Jayaprakash Narayan, and then prime minister Morarji Desai, Charan Singh.

Zakaria joined the Taj Group of Hotels to establish the first-rate five-star hotel, The Taj Residency, on the campus of Maulana Azad College of Arts and Science in Aurangabad. She became editor of the coffee table magazine Taj. Her office was located in the Taj Mahal Hotel in Mumbai. Thereafter, she introduced a hotel management course in alliance with a British university. She was on the board of Institute of Hotel Management, Aurangabad. She was the president of Maulana Azad Education Society (MAES) and chairman of Maulana Azad Educational Trust (MAET), both in Aurangabad.

The award Padma Shri was conferred on her by the Government of India in 2006. She received the award from President A. P. J. Abdul Kalam for her extensive work in the field of education.

Zakaria is regarded as a secularist and she took special care to cater to the educational needs of the Muslims.

== Personal life ==
Zakaria was the second wife of Rafiq Zakaria, who was an Indian politician and Islamic religious cleric. She was the step-mother of 2 children. The elder, Tasneem Zakaria Mehta, is an art historian and writer, living in Mumbai. The second is Mansoor Zakaria, a former Silicon Valley entrepreneur who is now a partner in a wealth management firm.

Her elder biological son, Arshad Zakaria, runs a hedge fund while her younger biological son, Fareed Zakaria, is a political commentator and journalist, and host of Fareed Zakaria GPS on CNN.

== Death ==
Zakaria died from COVID-19 at the Kamalnayan Bajaj Hospital in Aurangabad on 6 April 2021.
