= Mai Hero Boll Raha Hu =

2021 Indian web series

- Genre: Crime; Thriller
- Written by: Sarthak Juneja; Suparn Verma
- Directed by: Siddhartha Luther
- Starring: Parth Samthaan; Patralekha; Arslan Goni; Ankit Gupta
- Country of origin: India
- Original language: Hindi
- No. of seasons: 1
- No. of episodes: 13 (list of episodes)

Production
- Producer: Samar Khan
- Editor: Vikas Arora
- Production companies: Balaji Telefilms; Juggernaut Productions

Original release
- Network: ALTBalaji; ZEE5
- Release: 20 April 2021

Mai Hero Boll Raha Hu is an Indian Hindi-language gangster-thriller web series streaming on the ZEE5 and ALTBalaji platform. It stars Parth Samthaan in the role of a gangster along with Patralekha who plays an aspiring actress. The narrative is set in the 80's-90's era of the Mumbai underworld and chronicles the journey and rise of Parth Samthaan's character Nawab aka Hero. The web series was released on 20 April 2021.

== Plot ==
The story is about a 17-year-old boy Nawab (Parth Samthaan) who is forced to flee Bareilly, he soon turns into Bombay's most powerful don. Nawab’s most significant mentor is Lala (Arsalan Goni) who introduces him to the world of gun bazaars, counterfeit DVD rackets, smuggling, extortion, killings and shootouts. Nawab falls in love with Laila (Patralekha) an upcoming actress who isn't aware of his true identity.

== Cast ==
- Parth Samthaan as Nawab aka Hero
- Patralekha as Laila
- Arslan Goni as Lala
- Ankit Gupta as Inspector Sachin Kadam
- Anubhav Nanda as Yakub
- Upen Chauhan as Mushtaq
- Danish Husain as DadaBhai
- Chandan Roy Sanyal as Mastaan
- Arshin Mehta as Manasvi
- Indraneel Bhattacharya as Bakshi
- Pankaj Avadhesh Shukla as Baagha
- Tarun Chaturvedi as Mach Mach
- Saaquib Ayubi as Yeda
- Rohan Verma as Saavla
- Ganesh Yadav

== Episodes ==
No. overall	No. in season	Title	Directed by	Written by	Original release date
1	1	"Living in the stars"	Siddhartha Luther	Sarthak Juneja & Suparn Verma	20 April 2021
Nawab and his gang members get into a thrilling car chase with the police. In the past: Nawab escaped to Mumbai via train with his companions Harilal and Jagan and started copying and selling movies at black rates. Nawab soon puts forward the idea of entering the cable TV business that becomes quite successful but this doesn't go well with Dadabhai’s gang and the Shetty brothers. Baharatbhai's shop gets attacked leading to the tragic death of his father Harlal. Devastated Nawab vows to avenge his father’s death.
2	1	"The Big Fish"	Siddhartha Luther	Sarthak Juneja & Suparn Verma	20 April 2021
Nawab takes over Inspector Sachin Kadams police station by tying up the cops and recruiting prisoners in his gang. He ties constable Damle to a chair with a bomb, assess everyone in the police station and starts looking through the files for a name. Nawab gets one of the constables to tell him where the informer files were kept and Nawab finally getting his revenge on Pakkya, by having Yeda slit his throat.
3	1	"Untimely Rains"	Siddhartha Luther	Sarthak Juneja & Suparn Verma	20 April 2021
Inspector Kadam has a name for killing gangsters, so much that gang members began to fear him. Nawab tries to gets his hands on the informer's file to get the information he needs. Kadam calls Nawab to get a grasp on what he is trying to attain but Kadam gets dismissed. He then sees an ATS van and gears up to catch Nawab by scaling the side of the building to get in.
4	1	"Pawns and Rooks"	Siddhartha Luther	Sarthak Juneja & Suparn Verma	20 April 2021
Kadam who was climbing the building almost loses his grip but manages to get on the roof and ends up in a fight with Nawab. In the end, Kadam gets pushed off the roof but survives the fall with the harness tied around his waist. Someone uses the fight to burn the informer's file. Nawab gets very upset and takes out his frustration on the gang. He gets his men drunk and waits for them to let something slip to find the traitor.
5	1	"The Bigger Fish"	Siddhartha Luther	Sarthak Juneja & Suparn Verma	20 April 2021
Nawab spots someone flashing lights from the bathroom window and discovers there's a mole in the police station. Kadam confidently switches off all the radios to stop Nawab from getting any updates on what's happening outside. Nawab gets irritated and kicks the chair on which Damle was set with a bomb and the bomb goes off. Later Nawab asks to get the radio fixed as he already displayed the destruction he can cause. A nerdy looking punter Joseph steps up and volunteers himself to help with the radio, turns out Joseph is an undercover cop too.
6	1	"Old Friends, Older Enemies"	Siddhartha Luther	Sarthak Juneja & Suparn Verma	20 April 2021
Joseph tips Kadam about Nawab's whereabouts. In the past, this one-time Nawab was driving and almost hits Laila with his car, he got out and finally gets a chance to have a conversation with her. Pradeep pulls Nawab away by saying that Lala has called for him. At Mastan’s house, Lala gets furious after being scolded by his brother Mastan and screams at Nawab for always being at film city. Cut to the present, with the help of josephs information, Kadam convinces Bakshi to attack Nawab but things take a turn when they see Joseph hanging upside down from the ceiling.
7	1	"One step at a time"	Siddhartha Luther	Sarthak Juneja & Suparn Verma	20 April 2021
Kadam and Bakshi are shocked by Nawab's move as he makes a barter deal with the police officials. Nawab agreed to release Joseph only if Yakub is allowed to leave the premises and Manasvi is released from the cell. Bakshi had no choice and agreed to the deal. In the past, Lala leaves the country along with Hussainbhai, handing over Bombay to Nawab. Hussainbhai allots Nawab, Jagan and Yakub their new identities in Bangkok. Cut to the present: Based on the deal Yakub leaves the jail unharmed and Nawab tries to keep Joseph alive.
8	1	"Establishing Dominance"	Siddhartha Luther	Sarthak Juneja & Suparn Verma	20 April 2021
Nawab and his gang in suits are mesmerized by the beauty of Bangkok. Nawab spots Laila and falls in love with her while Laila is in lust. In the present; Nawab receives a call from Manasvi and is informed of her safety, he then allows Joseph's release. Nawab soon finds out Savla is the mole and he was the one giving out chits so Mushtaq kills Savla before he could even react. Despite Bakshi's restrains Kadam overrules his order and fire at Nawab and the gang.
9	1	"Burning Desires"	Siddhartha Luther	Sarthak Juneja & Suparn Verma	20 April 2021
Kadam gets a message from a mysterious voice on an ISD call, ordering him to clear a way for his men to kill Nawab. Cut to the past: Nawab with his fondness for Laila introduces her in a film. Laila makes it clear to him that she will not give her heart but Nawab says he is willing to wait and provides for her. Kadam gets attacked by someone in a random warehouse. In Bangkok, Lala learns that Nawab took Laila from the party by deceit. Back to the present: At the warehouse, Kadam learns the true identity of the mysterious silhouette.
10	1	"Pros and Cons"	Siddhartha Luther	Sarthak Juneja & Suparn Verma	20 April 2021
Kadam has a conversation with the silhouette and realises there's a small gang behind them. In the past: Nawab gets Dadabhai killed by getting his men to pose as cops. Nawab then flies to Bangkok where Mastan appreciates Nawab for his work. Lala gets jealous and is not happy with how things turned out. Cut to the present: Kadam helps gangsters to enter the building and kill Nawab. Gupi and Baagha plan to kill nawab in his sleep but get knocked out by Mushtaq instead.
11	1	"Desperate Times, Desperate Measures"	Siddhartha Luther	Sarthak Juneja & Suparn Verma	20 April 2021
Yeda, Mach Mach, John and Santya look for Nawab, while both Nawab and Mushtaq are balancing themselves on the ledge. In the past: Laila is unhappy about her past being exposed on the front page of a magazine. Nawab learns this and threatens the editor of the magazine. Soon a newspaper headline states Nawab as one of the most wanted men. So, Rajan asks Nawab to leave the country and Laila gets to know about Nawab’s true identity.
12	1	"Hunter is being Hunted"	Siddhartha Luther	Sarthak Juneja & Suparn Verma	20 April 2021
Yeda and Mach Mach shoot Nawab and he falls on the floor. Mushtaq comes to his rescue but Yeda and Mach Mach arrive and points gun at them. Blood is dripping from Nawab’s shoulder, Bakshi arrests everyone and shoves everyone in the ambulance but Nawab manages to escapes from their clutches and runs. Bakshi finds Nawab’s blood trail, he finds a tunnel in the solitary cell and learns about Nawab's escape.
13	1	"Take What You Get"	Siddhartha Luther	Sarthak Juneja & Suparn Verma	20 April 2021
In the past: Nawab and Laila run away from Bombay Queen but gets stopped at the check post where Laila hands over Nawab to the police. Nawab looks at Laila in disbelief. After being arrested he still manages to escapes from prison. Laila convinces Lala to come to Bombay, Rajan and Nawab plan on eliminating him once and for all.

== Reception ==
=== Critical reception ===
The Times of India gave a 2.5/5 rating and critically reviewed the OTT crime drama by stating that there is nothing new as the story is quite similar to the usual Bollywood gangster drama. The series is about a gangster who wants to rule Mumbai, exploit his Bollywood connection and is trapped in a love triangle alongside an inevitable gang war. ‘Mai Hero Boll Raha Hu’ is a good choice for someone who likes the gangster genre.

The Indian Express gave a review by calling the Parth Samthaan-starrer series "Filmy". Though it had a similar plot to any Bollywood gangster movies where a gangster rises from the dirt to rule the city. The narrative is pacy and dialogues sound a bit familiar but it only adds to the story and the characters. The young actor Parth Samthaan did a great job with his versatile acting skills and played the role of a gangster very well.

Binged gave a 5/10 rating to the ZEE5 web series stating that it is "A Watchable Old-Fashioned Gangster Saga". The screenplay is crisp and has enough twists to make up for the weak storyline. Fast-paced screenplay, old-fashioned dialogue baazi and Parth Samthaan's refreshing performances are some of the highlights of the series.
