= Badnaam Gali =

2019 web film by Ashwin Shetty

- Film poster
- Directed by: Ashwin Shetty
- Starring: Patralekha; Divyendu Sharma
- Cinematography: Vishnu Rao
- Distributed by: ZEE5
- Release date: 10 May 2019
- Running time: 120 minutes
- Country: India
- Language: Hindi

Badnaam Gali (transl. Infamous Lane) is 2019 Indian Hindi film released on ZEE5 on 10 May 2019. The film is about a surrogate mother. The film stars Patralekha Paul and Divyendu Sharma. The web film released on the occasion of Mother's Day. The film deals with surrogacy in a humorous way.

== Cast ==
- Patralekha as Nayonika (Nayan)
- Divyendu Sharma as Randeep Singh Sodhi
- Dolly Ahluwalia as Randeep's Bhua Ji.
- Paritosh Sand as Randeep's father

== Reception ==
The film received positive reviews. Ishita Sengupta of Indian Express stated that it is a fun film on surrogacy. Nafees Ahmed of High On Films wrote in his review,"Badnaam Gali is chocking with cliches for a subject matter that is original and exciting. Unfortunately, the writers played it safe to drive the point home."
