= Shweta Salve =

Indian television actress and model

Shveta Salve
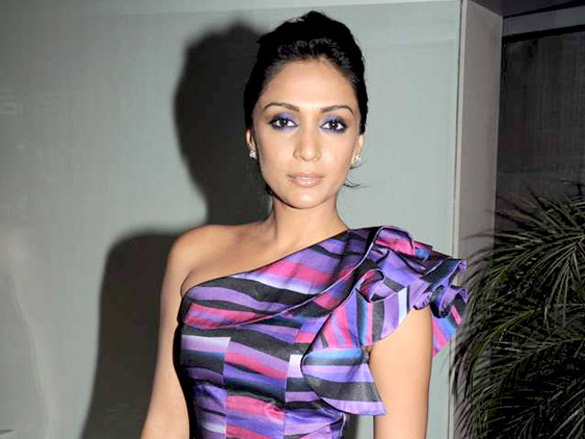
- Salve in 2011
- Born: Mumbai
- Occupations: Actress; model
- Years active: 1998–2018
- Spouse: Hermit Sethi (m. 2012)

Shveta Salve is an Indian television actress and model, best known as the 1st runner-up of the dance reality show Jhalak Dikhhla Jaa 1.

== Early life and education ==
Born in Chembur, Mumbai to Deepak and Hema Salve, sister of Sharvil. She studied in Loreto Convent School in Chembur and graduated with a BA degree from Sophia College, Mumbai. She displayed her talent in school dramas and dance performances. In her college festival Salve won the title of Miss Kaleidoscope.

== Career ==
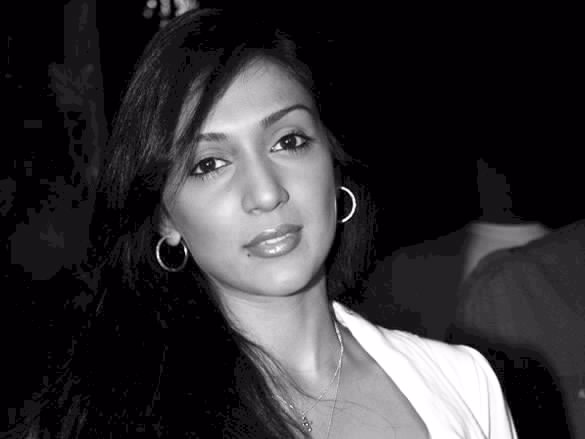
Salve in 2007

Salve was one of the main actors in Hip Hip Hurray, a television serial on Zee TV in 1998 and 2001. Salve acted in TV serials like Lipstick and Saarrkar, but she became popular in her role as Dr Ritu Mishra in Left Right Left on SAB TV. She made her feature film debut with Pyaar Mein Kabhi Kabhi (1999), which was also the feature film debut of host of actors including, Rinke Khanna, Sanjay Suri, Dino Morea and Akashdeep Saigal, though the film didn't do well at the box office. She later appeared in TV series like Kittie Party, Saarrkar, Kahin Kissi Roz and a brief role in Jassi Jaisi Koi Nahin.

She participated in the first season of popular dance show Jhalak Dikhhla Jaa (2006). She paired with the choreographer Longinus Fernandes and was the runner up. In 2007, she appeared as host of TV sports reality series, Cricket Star. She appeared on the cover of the April 2008 issue of Maxim India magazine.

She participated in the second season of the famous reality show of Indian television Khatron Ke Khiladi (Season 2), Indian version of Fear Factor as a participant.

She also performed an item number in the 2011 film Dil Toh Baccha Hai Ji and the 2011 film Lanka.

Heer Sara is her upcoming Indian Hindi-language film written and directed by Kartik Chaudhry. It stars Maanvi Gagroo, Patralekhaa, Shveta Salve and Arif Zakaria. The movie, also known as Heer Sara Aur Pondicherry, is a female-based road-trip drama, which is primarily about live journey of two young women from Indore—Heer and Sara, along their motorcycle journey from Indore to Pondicherry. Many things happen during the journey, which form the basis of this movie.

== Personal life ==
She married her long-time boyfriend Hermit Sethi on 24 April 2012. She has a baby girl, born 2016.

== Filmography ==
Year	Film	Role	Language	Notes
1999	Pyaar Mein Kabhi Kabhi	Radha	Hindi	
2010	Na Ghar Ke Na Ghaat Ke		Hindi	Special appearance
2011	Dil Toh Baccha Hai Ji		Hindi	item number
2011	Lanka		Hindi	Special appearance in item number "Hai Rama Rama"
2013	Kurukshetra	Neha Sawant	Marathi	
2026	Heer Sara	Lalita	Hindi	

== Television shows ==
Year	Program	Role	Channel	Notes
1998	Khauff	Episode 9 & Episode 10	Sony SAB	
1998	Hip Hip Hurray	Prishita	Zee TV	
1998-1999	Saturday Suspense		Zee TV	
2001 - 2002	Sansaar		Zee TV	
2002	Par Is Dil Ko Kaise Samjaye		Sony Entertainment Television	
2002	Kittie Party	Tina Sharma	Zee TV	
2002	Lipstick	Suniti Verma	Zee TV	
2004	CID: Special Bureau	Sunidhi	Sony Entertainment Television	
2005	Sarrkkar - Risshton Ki Ankahi Kahani	Shweta	Zee TV	
2006	Left Right Left	Dr. Ritu Mishra	SAB TV	
2006	Thodi Si Zameen Thoda Sa Aasmaan	Malvica Chopra	STAR Plus	
2006	Jhalak Dikhhla Jaa 1	Contestant	Sony Entertainment Television	first runner-up
2009	Fear Factor: Khatron Ke Khiladi 2	Contestant	Colors TV	9th place
2010	Dance India Dance		Zee TV	
2015	Ek Tha Chander Ek Thi Sudha	Pamela “Pammi” D’Cruz	Life OK	
2018	C.I.D.	Sheetal	Sony Entertainment Television	
