= Teerandaz (TV series) =

- Genre: Action; Thriller
- Written by: Sidharth Sengupta; Avinash Singh; Vijay Narayan Verma
- Directed by: Sidharth Sengupta; Ankush Mohla; Glen Barretto; Neel Guha
- Starring: Aditya Rawal; Ashish Vidyarthi; Sumeet Vyas; Patralekha; Shilpa Shukla
- Country of origin: India
- Original language: Hindi
- No. of seasons: 1
- No. of episodes: 8

Production
- Producers: Kishor Athwal; Richie Taneja
- Cinematography: Haresh Bhanushali, Rahul Chauhan
- Running time: 29-47 minutes
- Production company: Edgestorm Productions

Original release
- Network: Disney+ Hotstar
- Release: 30 December 2022

Teerandaz (formerly Aar Ya Paar) is a Hindi-language action thriller series written by Sidharth Sengupta, Avinash Singh, Vijay Narayan Verma and directed by Siddharth Sengupta, Ankush Mohla, Glen Barretto, Neel Guha, starring Aditya Rawal, Sumeet Vyas, Patralekha, Ashish Vidyarthi and Shilpa Shukla.

== Plot ==
The show is about Sarju, a tribal archer, living a simple life, is forced to stand up as a rebel against corrupt politicians and businesses to protect his community.

== Cast ==
- Ashish Vidyarthi as Ruben Bhatta; Business tycoon
- Aditya Rawal as Sarju
- Dibyendu Bhattacharya as Pulappa; Langa Tyagi
- Aasif Sheikh as Wasim Bhai
- Patralekha as Dr. Sanghamitra Das
- Shilpa Shukla as Kalawati Bhatta; Ruben Bhatta's wife
- Sumeet Vyas as Aditya Dutt
- Varun Badola as Ashit Bhatta
- Suzanne Bernert as Jenny Bhatta
- Nakul Roshan Sahdev as Kisna

== Episodes ==
No.	Title	Directed by	Written by	Original release date
1	"Sarju, The Beginning"	Glen Barretto, Neel Guha, Ankush Mohla	Sidharth Sengupta, Avinash Singh, Mohinder Pratap Singh, Vijay Narayan Verma	30 December 2022
2	"The Dalal"	Sidharth Sengupta, Ankush Mohla, Glen Barretto	Sidharth Sengupta, Avinash Singh, Mohinder Pratap Singh, Vijay Narayan Verma	30 December 2022
3	"Jab We Met"	Sidharth Sengupta, Ankush Mohla, Glen Barretto	Sidharth Sengupta, Avinash Singh, Mohinder Pratap Singh, Vijay Narayan Verma	30 December 2022
4	"Battle Cry"	Sidharth Sengupta, Ankush Mohla, Glen Barretto	Sidharth Sengupta, Avinash Singh, Mohinder Pratap Singh, Vijay Narayan Verma	30 December 2022
5	"Gold Medallist"	Neel Guha	Sidharth Sengupta, Avinash Singh, Mohinder Pratap Singh, Vijay Narayan Verma	30 December 2022
6	"Setu Lam"	Sidharth Sengupta, Ankush Mohla, Glen Barretto	Sidharth Sengupta, Avinash Singh, Mohinder Pratap Singh, Vijay Narayan Verma	30 December 2022
7	"Final Countdown"	Sidharth Sengupta, Ankush Mohla, Glen Barretto	Sidharth Sengupta, Avinash Singh, Mohinder Pratap Singh, Vijay Narayan Verma	30 December 2022
8	"The Devil Inside"	Neel Guha	Sidharth Sengupta, Avinash Singh, Mohinder Pratap Singh, Vijay Narayan Verma	30 December 2022

== Reception ==
Saibal Chatterjee of NDTV rated the 2 stras out of 5 and wrote "Aar Ya Paar isn't interested in exploring the plight of the tribal community that Sarju is a part of. The forest dwellers and their poisoned river are not what the spotlight is on. The series follows Sarju's single-minded efforts to punish the men responsible for his father's death."

Kartik Bhardwaj for The New Indian Express rated 2 stars out of 5 and wrote "Except for Ashish Vidyarthi and Dibyendu Bhattacharya, the cast also doesn’t leave a mark. Aditya Rawal as Sarju has few dialogues but his expressions speak even less. He is either poker-faced or enraged."

Nandini Ramnath for Scroll.in wrote "The Disney+ Hotstar series gives the urgent issue of the exploitation of indigenous communities the fully filmy treatment. Designed as a battle between sinister suits and forest-dwellers dressed in brown sack-like costumes, the show even has Avatar-like moments – but without the visual effects."

Manik Sharma for Firstpost wrote "This series travels to Romania, Poland etc but where it falters first is in the fictional town of Jadalganj, where it is initially set. Dahan, another Hotstar show set on the margins of urban India, did well to firmly anchor itself in a native culture that has to both elude yet intrigue. Aar Ya Paar achieves none of it because the milieu feels insincere, not to mention, offensive at certain points."

Archika Khurana for The Times of India wrote "The supporting cast, such as Shilpa Shukla, Vaarun Bhagat and Sumeet Vyas, has very little to contribute to the series. Though Sumeet is an interesting narrator, it would have been a great deal better if all of these characters were curated with more attention. In fact, even Patralekha’s character, Sanghamitra Das, who’s a doctor and connects with the tribals, falls short in terms of an emotional curve."

Ajit Andhare of Deccan Chronicle wrote "The major problem lies with the story by Anhata Menon, Umesh Padalkar, and Sidharth Sengupta. It’s too weak, oversimplistic, and largely conforms to the stereotypical portrayal of tribals. It paints a world that is black and white. Tribals are shown wearing sac-like clothes, speaking a perfectly and easily comprehensible dialect of Hindi, are expert archers, and are pros in their understanding of medicinal flora and fauna to the extent that they can treat cancer which even modern medicines cannot. It’s too superficial and no effort has been done to even scratch this surface."
