= Patralekha =

Indian actress (born 1990)

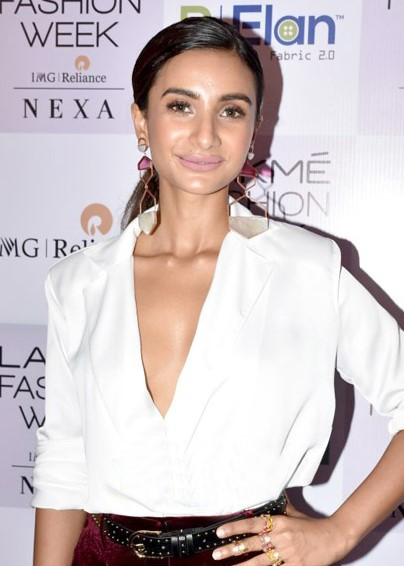
- Patralekha in 2018
- Born: Patralekha Paul; 20 February 1990 (age 36); Shillong, Meghalaya, India
- Other name: Patralekhaa
- Education: H.R. College of Commerce and Economics, Mumbai
- Occupation: Actress
- Years active: 2014–present
- Spouse: Rajkummar Rao (m. 2021)
- Children: 1

Patralekha Paul (Bengali pronunciation: [pɔtrolekʰa pal]; born Anwita Paul on 20 February 1990), known mononymously as Patralekha, is an Indian actress who works in Hindi films and series. Paul made her acting debut with drama film CityLights (2014), for which she won the Screen Award for Most Promising Newcomer – Female.

Patralekha appeared in the streaming miniseries Bose: Dead/Alive (2017). She has since appeared in the film Nanu Ki Jaanu (2018) and the series Mai Hero Boll Raha Hu (2021), Aar Ya Paar (2022) and IC 814: The Kandahar Hijack (2024). Patralekha is married to actor Rajkummar Rao.

== Early life and education ==
Patralekha was born as Anwita on 20 February 1990 in Shillong in a Bengali family, to a Chartered Accountant father and a homemaker mother Papri Paul. In an interview, she stated that her grandmother was a poet. She has two siblings Parnalekha Paul and Agnish Paul. She went to The Assam Valley School, Assam, a boarding school and then graduated from the Bishop Cotton Girls' School, Bangalore.

Patralekha's father wanted her to follow in his footsteps, but she was interested in acting. While completing her graduation in Mumbai at H.R. College of Commerce and Economics, she did a few commercials for Blackberry, and Tata Docomo, before getting a break in films. Patralekha has also received formal training in Bharatnatyam.

== Career ==
Patralekha made her film debut in the drama CityLights, opposite Rajkummar Rao. Directed by Hansal Mehta, the film tells the story of a poor couple living in Rajasthan who move to Mumbai in search of livelihood. Made on a low budget, the film became a box office success. Sweta Kaushal from Hindustan Times said that Patralekha "slipped effortlessly" in her part. The film won her Screen Award for Most Promising Newcomer – Female. Her next film was, Love Games, an urban-thriller directed by Vikram Bhatt and produced by Mukesh Bhatt and Mahesh Bhatt. Patralekha played a woman who lust for a man. It received negative reviews and was a box office failure.

In 2017, Patralekha made her web debut with Bose: Dead/Alive opposite Rajkummar Rao. For the series, she received iReel Award for Best Actress - Drama nomination. In the next year, Patralekha first appeared in the series Cheers. Patralekha then played a ghost opposite Abhay Deol in Nanu Ki Jaanu. Many critics found her part in the film to be "negligible". In 2019, Patralekha played a surrogate mother opposite Divyendu Sharma in the Zee5 film Badnaam Gali and received positive response for her performance.

After appearing in the 2020 series Forbidden Love, Patralekha played an aspiring actress in the 2021 series Mai Hero Boll Raha Hu, opposite Parth Samthaan. Archika Khurana of Times of India stated, "Patralekha raises the oomph factor as Laila and shares a sizzling chemistry with Parth." In 2022, she played an activist-doctor in the series Teerandaz. Saibal Chatterjee of NDTV noted, "Patralekha delivers in the scenes that matter. If only there were more such moments, her performance might have acquired greater depth and range."

In 2025, she portrayed the role of Savitribai Phule in the film Phule, for which she received praise.

In 2026, she co-produced the film Toaster, with her husband Rajkummar Rao, and she also made a cameo appearance in the film.

Heer Sara is her upcoming Indian Hindi-language film written and directed by Kartik Chaudhry. It stars Maanvi Gagroo, Patralekhaa, Shveta Salve and Arif Zakaria. The movie, also known as Heer Sara Aur Pondicherry, is a female-based road-trip drama, which is primarily about live journey of two young women from Indore—Heer and Sara, along their motorcycle journey from Indore to Pondicherry. Many things happen during the journey, which form the basis of this movie.

== Personal life ==
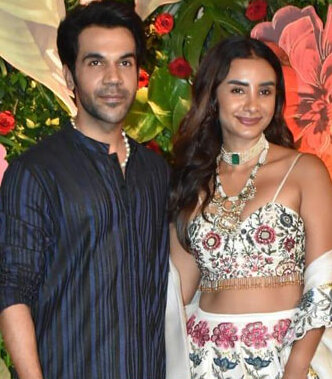
Patralekha with her husband Rajkummar Rao, in 2022

Patralekha has been in a relationship with actor Rajkummar Rao since 2010. On 15 November 2021, the couple got married in a traditional Hindu wedding at The Oberoi Sukhvilas Spa Resort in Chandigarh. The couple welcomed their first child, a daughter, whom they named Parvati Paul Rao, on their fourth wedding anniversary.

== Filmography ==
Key
†	Denotes films that have not yet been released

=== Films ===
Year	Title	Role	Notes	Ref.
2014	CityLights	Rakhi Singh		
2016	Love Games	Ramona Raichand		
2018	Nanu Ki Jaanu	Siddhi		
2019	Badnaam Gali	Nayonika "Nayan" Ganguly		
2024	Wild Wild Punjab	Radha		
2025	Phule	Savitribai Phule		
2026	Toaster	Herself	Cameo appearance	
2026	Heer Sara	Sara		
TBA	Suryast †	TBA	Completed	

=== Television ===
Year	Title	Role	Notes	Ref.
2017	Bose: Dead/Alive	Nandani		
2018	Cheers	Prerna		
2020	Forbidden Love	Keya	Episode: "Arranged Marriage"	
2021	Mai Hero Boll Raha Hu	Laila		
2022	Teerandaz	Dr. Sanghamitra Das		
2024	IC 814: The Kandahar Hijack	Air hostess Indrani		
TBA	Gulkanda Tales †	TBA	Filming	

== Awards and nominations ==
Year	Award	Category	Work	Result	Ref.
2014	BIG Star Entertainment Awards	Most Entertaining Debut Actress	CityLights	Nominated	
2014	Stardust Awards	Best Actress	CityLights	Nominated	
2015	21st Screen Awards	Most Promising Newcomer – Female	CityLights	Won	
2017	1st iReel Awards	Best Actress (Drama)	Bose: Dead/Alive	Nominated	
