= Arif Zakaria =

Indian actor (Born November 1966)

- Born: 11 November 1966 (age 60); Mumbai, Maharashtra, India
- Occupation: Actor
- Spouse: Namrata Sharma (m. 2002; div. 2010)
- Relatives: Asif Zakaria (brother); Rafiq Zakaria (uncle); Fatima Zakaria (aunt); Fareed Zakaria (cousin)

Arif Zakaria (born 11 November 1966) is an Indian actor who works in Hindi-language films. He is best known for Darmiyaan (1997), 1947: Earth (1998), Dance Like a Man (2004), and biographical projects Mardana and the controversial Nanak Shah Fakir.

== Early life ==
Arif Zakaria's uncle Rafiq Zakaria was a veteran politician from the Indian National Congress. His brother Asif Zakaria is also an INC politician and cousin Fareed Zakaria is an American journalist. Zakaria completed his graduation from Sydenham College of Commerce and Economics.

== Career ==
Zakaria began acting in theatre while in college and later moved on to work in television and films. He acted in numerous television serials like Chunauti, Karambhoomi, Mrityudand, Dhund, Aarzoo, Campus, Kaali - Ek Agnipariksha, etc. Arif acted in diverse roles in films like Darmiyaan, Hero, Asambhav and Dance Like a Man (English). Zakaria travelled the globe since 2005 with the Australian musical show Merchants of Bollywood, performing major roles in the production across Europe, China, France, Poland, Hong Kong, Singapore and Australia (the last season in Sydney in 2010).

The actor portrayed Rustom Sethna in Deepa Mehta's Earth/1947 and Major Dhillon in Shyam Benegal's Netaji Subhas Chandra Bose: The Forgotten Hero. He also appeared in Home Delivery: Aapko... Ghar Tak, Hazaaron Khwaishein Aisi, Deewaar and the Shah Rukh Khan film My Name is Khan.

In 2011, Arif played the ghost that haunts the female protagonist in Vikram Bhatt's Haunted and was appreciated for the ghastly portrayal of a piano teacher falling in love with his young student who gets murdered while making advances towards her and rapes her as a ghost, which forces her to commit suicide in the movie. He played the role of a police officer in Jism 2, starring Sunny Leone, appeared in Lootera and in Krrish 3 as Dr. Varun Shetty.

Other releases of the actor are Dee Saturday Night, Darr at the Mall, Blue Mountain (all 2014) and Nanak Shah Fakir and Ishq Forever (both 2015). He is also acting in the play Gardish Mein Taare, directed by Saif Hyder Hasan, which is based on the life of Guru Dutt. In 2015, Zakaria produced a children's film "Pinti Ka Sabun" for the Children's Film Society of India; (CFSI) this film is directed by Pramod Pathak.

In 2017, Arif was seen in Vikram Bhatt's web series Spotlight – Web series as famous actor/director/producer Dev Bannerjee. Featured in the short film Aamad – written and directed by Neeraj Udhwani for the Terribly Tiny Tales web portal.

Arif Zakaria also worked in Raazi, directed by Meghna Gulzar, along with Alia Bhatt and Vicky Kaushal and the film Ahaan, directed by first-time director Nikhil Pherwani; a tender story of a young man with down syndrome. He is slated to shoot for an English film Swords and Sceptres, a re-telling of the story of the Rani of Jhansi. Plays the role of Gaus Khan. Shooting commenced from October 2017 in Jaipur. At present the actor is playing the role of Gen. Bakhtiyar in a romance-thriller series Qubool Hai 2.0 that will be streamed on all ZEE5 platform.

Heer Sara is her upcoming Indian Hindi-language film written and directed by Kartik Chaudhry. It stars Maanvi Gagroo, Patralekhaa, Shveta Salve and Zakaria. The movie, also known as Heer Sara Aur Pondicherry, is a female-based road-trip drama, which is primarily about live journey of two young women from Indore—Heer and Sara, along their motorcycle journey from Indore to Pondicherry. Many things happen during the journey, which form the basis of this movie.

== Filmography ==
=== Television ===
Year	Title	Role
1987	Chunauti	
1988	Mujrim Hazir	
1989	Bhootnath	
1996	Campus	
1997	Gaatha	
1997	Darmiyaan: In Between	Immi, Mahzuddin Khan, Sitara
1998	Dawn	
1998	Amanat	Azhar
1999	Dhudh	
2010	Adaalat	Cannibal

=== Film ===
Year	Film	Role
1998	1947: Earth	Rustam Sethna
1999	Sangharsh	
2001	Shirdi Sai Baba	Young Sai Baba
2001	Mitti	Pahelwaan
2002	Pyaasa	Roshan Oberoi
2002	Refugee	
2003	The Hero: Love Story of a Spy	Karimuddin
2003	Footpath	Shyam
2003	Hazaaron Khwaishein Aisi	Daryll
2003	Dance Like a Man	Jairaj Parekh
2004	Deewaar	Rajan
2004	Asambhav	Music Manager
2004	Ab Tumhare Hawale Watan Saathiyo	Singer AK Singh
2004	Silence Please...The Dressing Room	Inspector Victor Anthony
2004	Netaji Subhas Chandra Bose: The Forgotten Hero	Gurbaksh Singh Dhillon
2005	Gilli Gilli Atta	
2005	Home Delivery	Page 3 Psycho
2006	Banaras	Inspector Satpal Shukla
2007	Highway 203	Police Officer
2009	Aladin	Professor Abu Nazir
2010	My Name Is Khan	Dr. Faisal Rehman
2010	Rokk	Vishwatma
2011	Haunted – 3D	Professor Iyer (evil spirit ghost)
2012	Agent Vinod	
2012	Jannat 2	Police Chief
2012	Jism 2	Guru Saldanah
2013	Shootout at Wadala	Sadiq
2013	Lootera	Bajpai
2013	Krrish 3	Dr. Varun Shetty
2014	Darr @ the Mall	Alok Manchanda
2015	Blue Mountains	Mr. Mathews
2016	Ishq Forever	
2016	Anna, Kisan Baburao Hazare	Master
2016	Pinti Ka Sabun	
2017	Poorna: Courage Has No Limit	Colonel Khan
2018	Raazi	Abdul
2018	Nanak Shah Fakir	
2019	The Warrior Queen of Jhansi	Ghaus Khan
2019	War	Dr. Utpal Biswas
2019	The Body	Mohammed Shekhawat
2020	Gul Makai	Sufi Mohammed
2021	420 IPC	Neeraj Sinha
2023	Mastaney	Wazir
2023	Mission Raniganj	DG Om Chakravarti
2026	Heer Sara	Dharamveer

=== Web series ===
Year	Title	Role	Platform
2017	Spotlight	Devv Benerjee	Viu
2019	Leila	Guru Ma	Netflix
2020	Avrodh: The Siege Within	Ali Raza Khan	SonyLiv
2021	Qubool Hai 2.0	Gen. Bakhtiyar	ZEE5
2021	1962: The War in the Hills	Prime Minister Jawaharlal Nehru	Disney+Hotstar
2022	Shoorveer	Pakistan General Riaz Ahmed	Disney+Hotstar
2024	Freedom at Midnight	Mohammad Ali Jinnah	SonyLIV
2025	Special Ops 2	Dr. Bhargav	JioHotstar

== Personal life ==
Zakaria married Namrata Sharma, a Fashion Writer, in 2002 and they have a son. The couple divorced in 2010.
