= Rafiq Zakaria =

Indian politician (1920–2005)

- Born: 5 April 1920; Nala Sopara, British India
- Died: 9 July 2005 (aged 85); Mumbai, Maharashtra, India
- Resting place: Aurangabad, Maharashtra
- Occupations: Indian politician and Islamic religious cleric
- Known for: Served in Indian Parliament; Former Deputy Chairman, Rajya Sabha; Former Cabinet Minister in Maharashtra State; Founded schools and colleges; Former President of Maharashtra College in Mumbai
- Notable work: A Study of Nehru (ed.); The Struggle Within Islam; Muhammed and the Quran; The Price of Partition; Communal Rage in Secular India
- Spouse: Fatima Zakaria
- Children: 4, including Fareed Zakaria
- Relatives: Asif Zakaria (nephew); Arif Zakaria (nephew); Salim Zakaria (cousin); Ahmed Zakaria (brother)

Rafiq Zakaria (5 April 1920 – 9 July 2005) was an Indian politician and Islamic religious cleric. Zakaria represented India abroad at the United Nations thrice. He was the first Muslim urban development minister of the newly created Maharashtra State. Later, he served as deputy to Former Prime Minister Indira Gandhi, the leader of the Congress Party, in the Lok Sabha. He was closely associated with the Indian independence movement and the Indian National Congress party. He was known for his advocacy of traditional Islam.

== Early life and education ==
Zakaria, a Konkani from Maharashtra, was an alumnus of Ismail Yusuf College, Mumbai. He won the Chancellor's Gold Medal in the MA examination of the University of Mumbai and in 1948 received a PhD from the School of Oriental and African Studies, University of London. His doctoral thesis was titled Muslims in India: a political analysis (from 1885–1906). He was called to the bar from Lincoln's Inn in England.

== Career ==
Zakaria practised law in Mumbai, where he was appointed Chief Public Prosecutor. He spent over 25 years in public service, including some time as a cabinet minister in the state government of Maharashtra and later as a Member of the Indian parliament. He served as deputy to Indira Gandhi, the leader of the Congress Party, in the Lok Sabha. Zakaria represented India abroad, including at the United Nations in 1965, 1990 and 1996.

He was Chancellor of the Jamia Urdu, Aligarh (Uttar Pradesh), and President of Maharashtra College in Mumbai.

== Aurangabad ==
Zakaria contested the first election of the newly created Maharashtra state in 1962, from Aurangabad, and was elected to Maharashtra assembly. He was made Minister for Urban Development in the new ministry. It was under his guidance that planning for New Aurangabad was initiated. The responsibility for the new city was given to CIDCO which started development in the 1970s.

He founded a number of schools and colleges in his constituency. These included a women's college of arts and sciences and the Indian Institute of Hotel Management, which is now known as the Institute of Hotel Management, Aurangabad (IHM-A). The Maulana Azad Education Trust Aurangabad operates multiple educational institutions.

== Works ==
His many books include A Study of Nehru (ed.), The Struggle Within Islam, Muhammed and the Quran, The Price of Partition, and Communal Rage in Secular India.

Zakaria mostly wrote on Indian affairs, Islam and the British Raj. His works include:

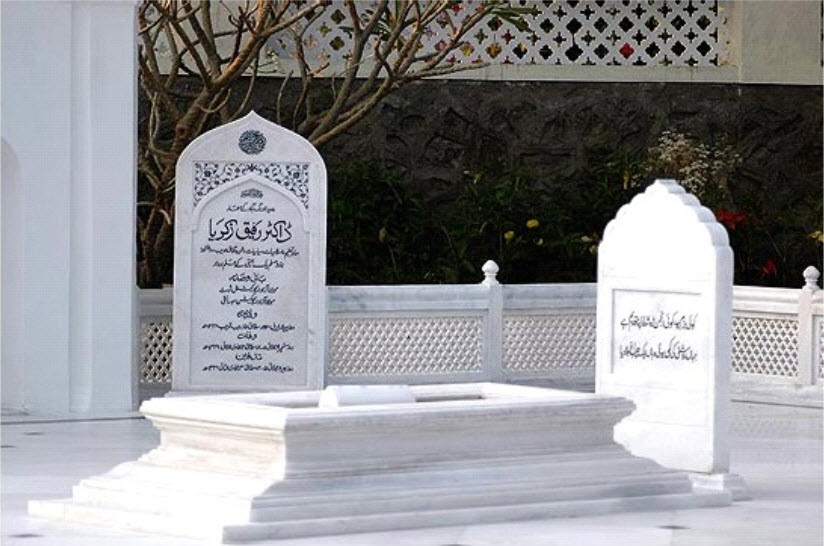
Tomb of Rafiq Zakaria in Aurangabad

- A Study of Nehru
- The Man Who Divided India
- Razia: Queen of India
- The Widening Divide
- Discovery of God
- Muhammad and the Quran
- Rise of Muslims in Indian Politics
- The Struggle Within Islam
- Conflict Between Religion and Politics
- Iqbal, the Poet and the Politician (1993)
- The Price of Partition
- Gandhi and the Break-up of India
- Indian Muslims: Where Have They Gone Wrong?
- Sardar Patel and Indian Muslims
- Communal Rage in Secular India (On the aftermath of the Godhra Riots)
- The Trial of Benazir (1989)

He had earlier worked for the News Chronicle and The Observer in London, United Kingdom. Zakaria also penned a bi-weekly column for the Times of India newspaper.

== Personal life ==
Zakaria was married twice. His second wife, Fatima Zakaria was an imminent personality as a journalist in her own right.He was the father of four children by his two wives:

- Mansoor Zakaria and Tasneem Zakaria Mehta, the art historian who works with INTACH in Mumbai, by his first wife, Shehnaz Khan, the daughter of a Bhopali aristocrat.
- Arshad Zakaria and Fareed Zakaria, the American journalist, by his second wife, Fatima Zakaria, who was for a time the editor of the Sunday Times of India and was in 2008 the editor of the Taj magazine of the Taj Hotels.

== See also ==
- Syed Akbaruddin
