= Asif Zakaria =

Indian politician

Corporator Ward 101 Brihanmumbai Municipal Corporation
- In office 2017–2022
- Preceded by: Karen Cecilia Allen D'Mello
- Succeeded by: Corporation Suspended

Corporator Ward 95 Brihanmumbai Municipal Corporation
- In office 2012–2017
- Succeeded by: Swapna Virendra Mhatre

Corporator Ward 96 Brihanmumbai Municipal Corporation
- In office 2007–2012
- Succeeded by: Karen Cecilia Allen D'Mello

Personal details
- Party: Indian National Congress
- Spouse: Sukoon Zakaria
- Relatives: Arif Zakaria (brother); Rafiq Zakaria (uncle); Fatima Zakaria (aunt); Fareed Zakaria (cousin); Salim Zakaria (cousin)
- Education: St. Andrew's School Bandra, Sydenham College of Economics and Commerce Mumbai
- Occupation: Politician
- Profession: Businessman, Social Worker

Asif Zakaria is an Indian politician from the Indian National Congress. Zakaria represents the Bandra Mumbai constituency and is a three-term Corporator. Asif Ahmed Zakaria is a 3- term Municipal Councillor. He has been described as a cosmopolitan and progressive politician. Being a 24×7 person he is known for being approachable and accessible. His notable works include making St. Paul's Road flood free and improving Almeida Park. Asif Zakaria has also beautified a vacant space between Pereira Road and B. J. Road in Bandstand.

Asif Zakaria was officially nominated by the Congress Party as the INDIA alliance candidate from the Bandra West Assembly seat for the 2024 Maharashtra Elections.

== Life ==
Asif Zakaria grew up at Zakaria Mansion near Almeida Park and continues to live there. Asif Zakaria's uncle Rafiq Zakaria was a veteran politician from the Indian National Congress. Asif Zakaria's brother Arif is in the entertainment industry and cousin Fareed is a journalist. Asif Zakaria father Ahmed Zakaria was MLA in 1980-1985.
