= Toaster (film) =

2026 Indian film by Vivek Daschaudary

- Official release poster
- Directed by: Vivek Daschaudary
- Screenplay by: Parveez Shaikh; Akshat Ghildial; Anagh Mukherjee
- Story by: Parveez Shaik
- Produced by: Rajkummar Rao; Patralekhaa; Tarun Bali
- Starring: Rajkummar Rao; Sanya Malhotra; Archana Puran Singh; Upendra Limaye; Farah Khan; Abhishek Banerjee; Jitendra Joshi
- Cinematography: Jishnu Bhattacharjee
- Edited by: Chandrashekhar Prajapati
- Music by: Aman Pant
- Production company: Kampa Films
- Distributed by: Netflix
- Release date: 15 April 2026
- Running time: 126 minutes
- Country: India
- Language: Hindi

Toaster is a 2026 Indian Hindi-language black comedy thriller film directed by Vivek Daschaudary. It is produced by Rajkummar Rao, Patralekha and Tarun Bali under KAMPA Films. It marks Patralekha's debut as a film producer. The film stars Rajkummar Rao and Sanya Malhotra in the lead roles. The story follows a stingy man who becomes irrationally obsessed with a toaster he gifted to a newlywed couple, getting entangled in a chain of mishaps involving murder and mayhem.

The film was released on Netflix on 15 April 2026.

== Plot ==
Ramakant (Rajkummar Rao) is a miserly perfume shop owner who lives with his wife, Shilpa (Sanya Malhotra). They are tenants of Mrs. D’Souza (Seema Pahwa), who lives in the same building with her son, Glen (Abhishek Banerjee). Glen is blackmailing a prominent politician with an incriminating video, which he has saved on a SIM card.

The couple attends a wedding and gifts the newlyweds a toaster worth ₹4,999; however, when the marriage is dissolved only a day later, Ramakant decides to reclaim the gift without telling Shilpa. He is informed that all wedding presents have already been donated to an orphanage. Nandini (Farah Khan), the head of the orphanage, refuses to return the toaster as it is already in use. That night a blundering Ramakant steals it, but is recognized in the process. Glen steals the toaster from him, and hides the sim card containing the incriminating video in it.

The following day, the police arrive at Ramakant’s house after Nandini reports the theft and names him as the prime suspect. Meanwhile, Ramakant spots Glen carrying the toaster to a mall to meet a mysterious man. Shortly after, Mrs. D’Souza passes away. While visiting her home, Ramakant finds the toaster and attempts to take it, but a drunken Glen confronts him. During the ensuing scuffle, Glen accidentally falls from the balcony to his death. An elderly neighbour, Malini Pherwani (Archana Puran Singh), films the incident and uses the footage to blackmail Ramakant into a sexual relationship. Ramakant’s frequent nights away from home begin to strain his marriage with Shilpa.

Ramakant steals her phone to erase his incriminating video, but she has it saved in a SIM card. Desperate, Ramakant asks his perfume supplier, Guddu (Vinod Rawat), to intervene and deal with Malini. However, Malini overpowers and kills Guddu, forcing Ramakant to bury the body. Inspector Balagode (Upendra Limaye)—the man Glen had met at the mall—investigates the disappearances while secretly searching for the same toaster. He suspects Ramakant after Nandini checks in on the theft case. When Balagode attempts to arrest Ramakant, Malini intervenes by paying Nandini for the toaster to drop the charges. Malini acquires the toaster and saves her SIM card in it. When the Inspector later confronts Malini, she seemingly kills him and once again forces Ramakant to dispose of the body.

Shilpa, having secretly followed them, confronts the duo as they attempt to bury Balagode in the same grave as Guddu. To their shock, Balagode—who is on the politicians payroll—is still alive; he holds them at gunpoint, revealing that the toaster contains an SD card with an incriminating video.

In a final brawl, Malini kills Balagode but is subsequently killed by Ramakant and Shilpa in self-defense. The politician arrives with his henchmen to retrieve the evidence. Ramakant hands over a card, which the politician destroys before letting the couple go. However, Ramakant reveals to Shilpa that he tricked the politician into destroying the blackmail footage of himself, while keeping the politician's evidence as leverage. The couple reconciles and hitches a ride home.

== Cast ==
- Rajkummar Rao as Ramakant “Ramu” Parikh
- Sanya Malhotra as Shilpa Parikh
- Archana Puran Singh as Malini Pherwani
- Farah Khan as Nandini
- Abhishek Banerjee as Glenn D'Souza
- Upendra Limaye as Inspector Balagode
- Jitendra Joshi as Amol Ambre
- Vinod Rawat as Guddu
- Karmveer Choudhary as Guruji
- Seema Pahwa as D'Souza Aunty
- Patralekha (cameo)
- Pratik Gandhi as customer (cameo)
- Dev Raaz

== Production ==
=== Development ===
The film is produced by Rajkummar Rao and Patralekhaa under their banner KAMPA Films. Patralekhaa stated that she chose not to act in the project in order to focus on understanding the filmmaking process from the production side and to gain experience behind the camera.

=== Casting ===
The film was announced on 22 May 2024. Sonakshi Sinha was initially attached to play the female lead but was later replaced by Sanya Malhotra before filming began in the latter half of 2024. Archana Puran Singh, who described her part in the film as the best role of her career, reunites with Rao after their collaboration on Vicky Vidya Ka Woh Wala Video. Abhishek Banerjee appears in a cameo, having agreed to the role at Rao’s request; the two actors have shared a longstanding working relationship since Stree (2018) and Stree 2 (2024). Seema Pahwa also reteams with Rao following Bareilly Ki Barfi (2017). Rao and Malhotra reunite three years after working together in Ludo (2020) and HIT: The First Case (2022). Most of the previous cast members had previously worked with each other in various films with exception of Farah Khan.

=== Filming ===
Filming began in the latter half of 2024, following the replacement of Sonakshi Sinha with Sanya Malhotra. Principal photography was completed shortly before Netflix officially announced the film on 3 February 2025. Rao and Malhotra reunited on the project three years after their collaboration on HIT: The First Case (2022). During production, Archana Puran Singh suffered a fall while shooting an early morning sequence in Virar, resulting in a fractured right wrist. She underwent surgery and later attended the film’s announcement event with her hand in a cast. Despite the injury, she completed her portions, with scenes filmed in a manner that concealed the cast on screen.

== Release ==
Toaster was released on Netflix on 15 April 2026.

== Reception ==
On the review aggregator website Rotten Tomatoes, 64% of 11 critics' reviews are positive, with an average rating of 5/10.

Rahul Desai of The Hollywood Reporter India stated that it is a movie with a "sense of humour." Shreyas Pande of The Hindu writes that "the film delivers on the laughs even when the writing remains largely perfunctory as it operates within safer zones" Hardika Gupta of NDTV gave 1 star out of 5 and said that "It feels like a film that had all the right ingredients but forgot the recipe." Shubhra Gupta of The Indian Express gave 1 star out of 5 and writes that "For a film like this to work, you need zippy writing, full of smart gags. In this Rajkummar Rao-Sanya Malhotra-starrer, so little lands that it's deeply depressing: you are left scraping off burnt toast."

Bollywood Hungama rated it 3/5 stars and said that the film is a "quirky entertainer that benefits greatly from its unusual plot and Rajkummar Rao's thoroughly enjoyable performance. Despite a weaker second half, the film has enough amusing moments and eccentricity to keep one invested." Devesh Sharma of Filmfare gave 4 stars out of 5 and writes that the film marks a confident debut for the director and the producers, and that it is a "light-hearted comedy that pokes good-natured fun at people who are stingy with their money without ever hitting below the belt." Vineeta Kumar of India Today rated it 3/5 stars and observed that the film looks even better "when you realise that dark comedies are not forgiving. It demands precision in everything - writing, performances and edit. The film largely meets that demand. It understands that the humour must come from discomfort, not decoration. Even its visual choices, like the interplay of light and shadow in major moments, add to the mood without calling attention to themselves." Kartik Bhardwaj of Cinema Express said that the film had the potential to be a "quirky, crazy ride but it gets derailed quite soon. Great premise, great actors, it gets two ingredients correct but the screenplay lacks spice."
