= Darling (2012 film) =

- Directed by: Raaj Mukherjee
- Written by: Raaj Mukherjee
- Produced by: Nalin Singh
- Starring: Mayukh Mazumder; Pamela Mandal; Riya Chanda
- Cinematography: Sandip Sen
- Music by: Subhayu Bedajna
- Release date: 27 July 2012
- Running time: 160 minutes
- Country: India
- Language: Bengali

Darling is a 2012 Indian Bengali romance film written and directed by Raaj Mukherjee, starring Mayukh Mazumdar, Pamela Mandal and Riya Chanda. The film is produced by Nalin Singh and co-produced by Ajesh Gugnani, and features music scored by Subhayu Bedajna, while the cinematography is by Sandip Sen. This film is the Bengali Remake of the Telugu film Darling starring Prabhas and Kajal Aggarwal.

== Plot ==
The film begins with an enthusiastic 1980's backdrop. Four college mates disperse after farewell and remain in contact even after decades. Mayukh is the son of one of the old friends and Aishwariya is the daughter of the other. They live in different places. A girl Riya falls in love with Mayukh and proposes to him. But he rejects the proposal. The father of the girl who happens to be a goon, surrounds Mayukh and his friends' for rejecting his daughter. To escape from the goon Mayukh narrates his flash back stating that he has a love interest, Aishwariya who he met in GOA . The goon feels sympathetic and leaves him after listening to the story. After a while, the old friends wish to have an old friends' reunion with families. They all meet in a village and now Mayukh and Aishwariya meet once again.

== Cast ==
- Mayukh Mazumdar as Surya
- Pamela Mandal as Diya
- Riya Chanda as Payal
- Aishwariya

== Soundtrack ==
Darling

Soundtrack album by Subhayu Bedajna
- Released: 5 March 2012
- Recorded: 2011
- Genre: Film soundtrack

The soundtrack and background score is composed by Subhayu Bedajna]. Six songs are performed by leading Bollywood singers – Shaan, Kunal Ganjawala, Soham Chakraborty, June Banerjee and Pamela Jain. Three songs lyrics are written by Raaj Mukherjee, the other three songs lyrics are written by Gautam Sushmit.

No.	Title	Singer(s)	Length
1.	"Misti Misti Hashi"	Shaan, June Banerjee	5:20
2.	"Moneri Aakashe Te"	Soham Chakraborty	5:24
3.	"Hey Darling"	Kunal Ganjawala	5:00
4.	"Uru Uru Monta"	Pamela Jain	4:55
5.	"Holo Je Eki Locha"	Kunal Ganjawala	3:43
6.	"Tomari Chokhe Chokhe Kotha"	Shaan	3:17
7.	"Tomar Misti Misti Hasi" (Lounge Mix)		4:16
8.	"Hey Darling" (Lounge Mix)		5:17
