= Chupi Chupi =

- Theatrical release poster
- Directed by: Abir Bose
- Screenplay by: Soumyava Goswami
- Story by: Mehuli Das
- Produced by: Rakesh Shrivastav
- Starring: See below
- Cinematography: Shyamal Banerjee
- Music by: Goutam Ganguly
- Distributed by: Ma Sarada Chitra Mandir 2012 Production
- Release date: 26 April 2013 (Kolkata)
- Country: India
- Language: Bengali

Chupi Chupi (English: Silently) is a 2013 film directed by Abir Bose and produced by Rakesh Shrivastav under the banner of Ma Sarada Chitra Mandir 2012 Production. It features actors Ritojit and Priyanka Haldar in the lead roles. This film is Abir Bose's third film, his last release being long back in 1988 (Kidnap). It released on 26 April 2013.

== Plot ==
The film is a love story based on the Ghoti-Bangal theme. It is a romantic drama where a couple from Siliguri, namely Gourab and Jini, fall in love and dream of spending their life together. But when it comes to convincing their concerned families, a weird thing happens. Involving Bangal-Ghoti feud, their life becomes unmanageable and miserable. Both families send them off to Kolkata, but at different places to try to break their relationship. While moving to Kolkata, Jini prepares herself and apparently gets a job at a private concern. After this, the story has its twists.

== Cast ==
Cutting through the age spectrum, the music will definitely be successful in touching hearts of people in love with Bengali cinema. As I wanted to spread the magic of saga of love on the screen I consciously needed a fresh pair but not of the glitterati. Even if the hero Ritojit is a film old but this is the first film of Priyanka. But leaving their freshness behind if you consider the music it will be simply superb.

— Director Abir Bose about the music and casting of Chupi Chupi

=== Main cast ===
- Hritojeet Chottopadhay as Gourab
- Priyanka Haldar as Jini

=== Supporting cast ===
- Laboni Sarkar
- Koushik Bandyopadhyay
- Kharaj Mukherjee
- Manasi Sinha
- Subhasish Banerjee
- Rashmi Jha
- Satabdi Pal
- Tanmay Chanda
- Bijit Basu
- Mrinmoy Chaudhury

== Soundtrack ==
Chupi Chupi

Soundtrack album to Chupi Chupi by Goutam Ganguly
- Released: 10 April 2013
- Genre: Feature film soundtrack
- Language: Bengali
- Label: Dhoom Music

The soundtrack of Chupi Chupi was composed by Goutam Ganguly. The lyrics were penned by Goutam Susmit, Goutam Ganguly and director Abir Bose.

=== Track listing ===
No.	Title	Lyrics	Singer(s)	Length
1.	"Chupi Chupi"	Goutam Susmit	Snehajit, Roshni Saha, Subhalakshmi, Goutam Ganguly
2.	"I Am In Love"	Goutam Susmit	Shaan, June Banerjee
3.	"Jane Kab Hua"	Goutam Susmit	Snehajit, Roshni Saha, Subhalakshmi, Goutam Ganguly
4.	"Jibon Aamar"	Goutam Ganguly	Snehajit
5.	"Kothay Haralo"	Abir Bose	Subhamita Banerjee
6.	"Thodi Thodi Mulakatein"	Goutam Susmit	Kunal Ganjawala, June Banerjee
