= Heer Sara =

2026 Hindi film

- Directed by: Kartik Chaudhry
- Screenplay by: Arjun Iyer
- Story by: Kartik Chaudhry; Manuj Sharma
- Starring: Maanvi Gagroo; Patralekha; Shweta Salve; Arif Zakaria
- Cinematography: Arjun Venkatesh
- Edited by: Kanishk Singh
- Production companies: Maghaa Creations; Next Level Productions; Opticus
- Release date: 12 June 2026
- Country: India
- Language: Hindi

Heer Sara is a 2026 Indian Hindi-language drama film written and directed by Kartik Chaudhry. It stars Maanvi Gagroo, Patralekha, Shweta Salve and Arif Zakaria.

The movie, also known as Heer Sara Aur Pondicherry, is a female-based road-trip drama, which is primarily about live journey of two young women from Indore—Heer and Sara, along their motorcycle journey from Indore to Pondicherry.

Many things happen during the journey, which form the basis of this movie. It was released on 12 June 2026.

== Plot ==
The movie is based on a rebellious motorcycle tour of two young women. The two girls have completely different end goals for the journey. Sara’s journey is aimed at searching for her mother, who had abandoned her a long time ago, while Heer’s journey is aimed at bringing the real facts behind a secretive marriage.

This journey itself becomes the story of the movie, during the course of which many things happen, thereby slowly unravelling the basic spirit and intent of the movie.

== Cast ==
- Maanvi Gagroo as Heer
- Patralekha as Sara
- Shweta Salve as Lalita
- Arif Zakaria as Dharamvir
- Nishank Verma as Tanmay

== Release ==
Heer Sara was released on 12 June 2026.

== Reception ==
Subhash K Jha of Tribune writes that "For a first-timer, Kartik Chaudhry reveals an impressive grip over the narrative and the characters, keeping a firm control over their hectic journey but at the same time loosening the grip to let the girls have fun when they are boozy or sentimental, or both...By the way, the road trip is not just about fun and games. There are some serious interventions in the ladies’ raillery by bringing in sensitive subjects such as bodyshaming and same-sex relationships. None of this seems imposed, least of all intrusive." Devesh Sharma of Filmfare gave 3.5 stars out of 5 and said that "Ultimately, this is a moving story about women reclaiming their lives on their own terms."
