= Forbidden Love (2020 TV series) =

Indian Hindi-language miniseries

- Directed by: Pradeep Sarkar; Priyadarshan; Aniruddha Roy Chowdhury; Mahesh Manjrekar
- Starring: Aditya Seal; Pooja Kumar; Omkar Kapoor; Patralekha; Ali Fazal; Rannvijay Singha; Aahana Kumra; Chandan Roy Sanyal; Mahesh Manjrekar; Raima Sen; Vaibhav
- Country of origin: India
- Original language: Hindi

Production
- Producers: Ratan Jain; Ganesh Jain; Sanchita Chaterjee
- Running time: 40 minutes
- Production company: Venus Worldwide Entertainment

Original release
- Release: 9 September 2020

Forbidden Love is a 2020 Indian ZEE5 original Hindi-language miniseries directed by Pradeep Sarkar, Priyadarshan, Aniruddha Roy Chowdhury and Mahesh Manjrekar starring Aditya Seal, Pooja Kumar, Ali Fazal, Omkar Kapoor, Patralekha, Aahana Kumra, Chandan Roy Sanyal, Raima Sen and Rannvijay Singha. The show was released on ZEE5 in 4 chapters. Anamika & Arranged Marriage on 9 September 2020 and Diagnosis of Love & Rule of Games on 24 September.

== Chapters ==
Chapter	Segment Title	Director	Cast	Writer
1	Arranged Marriage	Pradeep Sarkar and Arjun Balakrishnan	Ali Fazal, Patralekha, Omkar Kapoor	Suchhanda Chatterjee, Sonal Sehgal
2	Anamika	Priyadarshan	Aditya Seal, Pooja Kumar, Harsh Chhaya	Priyadarshan
3	Rules of the Game	Aniruddha Roy Chowdhury	Chandan Roy Sanyal, Aahana Kumra, Anindita Bose	
4	Diagnosis of Love	Arjun Balakrishnan, Mahesh Manjrekar	Mahesh Manjrekar, Raima Sen, Rannvijay Singh, Vaibhav Tatwawadi	

== Cast ==
=== Arranged Marriage ===
- Omkar Kapoor as Neelanjan "Neel" Sen - Keya's husband and Dev's lover
- Patralekha as Keya - Neel's wife and Dev's cousin
- Ali Fazal as Dev - Neel's lover and Keya's cousins
- Reshmi Sen as Neel's mother
- Lily Chakravarty as Shanti Aunty
- Sayani Mukhopadhyay as Sex Worker 1
- Arundhati Mukharjee as Sex Worker 2

=== Anamika ===
- Aditya Seal as Ishaan/ Amir Qureshi
- Pooja Kumar as Anamika
- Harsh Chhaya as Vijayendra - Anamika's husband
- Dean Bose as Adil Khan/ Ishaan's cousin

=== Rules of the Game ===
- Aahana Kumra as Priya
- Chandan Roy Sanyal as Gaurav - Priya's husband
- Anindita Bose as Nisha - Priya's friend

=== Diagnosis of Love ===
- Mahesh Manjrekar as Vaibhav - Sudha's husband
- Raima Sen as Sudha - Vaibhab's wife
- Vaibhav Tatwawadi as Harsh - Kalindi's boyfriend
- Mrunmayee Deshpande as Kalindi - Harsh's girlfriend
- Rannvijay Singh as Aditya

== Release ==
ZEE5 released the first movie on the platform on 9 September 2020.
