= ?: A Question Mark =

- Theatrical release poster
- Directed by: Allyson Patel; Yash Dave
- Written by: Allyson Patel; Yash Dave
- Produced by: Trippletake Motion Pictures
- Starring: Maanvi Gagroo; Akhlaque Khan; Yaman Chatwal; Varun Thakur; Sonam Mukherjee; Kiran Bhatia; Chirag Jain
- Cinematography: M. Anandan; Allyson Patel
- Edited by: Udhaya Rajani
- Distributed by: Percept Picture Company (Shailendra Singh)
- Release date: 17 February 2012
- Running time: 82 minutes
- Country: India
- Language: Hindi
- Budget: Rs.80,00,000

?: A Question Mark is a 2012 Hindi language horror film written and directed by Allyson Patel and Yash Dave, and produced by Trippletake Motion Pictures. It was distributed by Percept Picture Company. The film received nine nominations and two awards at the St. Tropez International Film Festival in France. Akhlaque Khan won the best actor award while Udhaya Rajni won the award for best editing. The film also received a standing ovation at the Oaxaca Film Festival in Mexico.

The producers wanted to use just the symbol "?" as the film's title, as a symbol for the unseen, unheard story. However, the movie had to be released with a written title due to censorship rules, so it was called "Question Mark."

It delves into the found footage genre.

== Plot ==
In November 2010, a group of friends went to a place to shoot their final year project film but never returned. A few days later, their camera is found. What happened to them was captured on the camera. The film is a compilation of the footage retrieved from it.

== Cast ==
- Maanvi Gagroo as Maanvi
- Akhlaque Khan as Akki
- Yaman Chatwal as Vicky
- Varun Thakur as Varun
- Sonam Mukherjee as Simran
- Kiran Bhatia as Kiran
- Chirag Jain as C.J.

== Production ==
=== Casting ===
After auditioning around 120 people, the directors finally zeroed in on the seven cast members. Each actor brought in their own personality to make the characters more believable. To help the actors be as natural as possible, they used their real names and all the scenes were improvised so as to appear real. The actors were made to rehearse the whole film several times before they came on the sets. Akhlaque Khan (Akki) was not a part of the cast initially. However, with just a couple of weeks to go before the shoot, the actor assigned to play Akki's part bowed out and in came Akhlaque who, eventually won the award for the best actor at the St. Tropez International Film Festival, France St. Tropez International Film Festival, France 2013.

== Release ==
The film was released in theaters across India on 17 February 2012 by Percept Picture Company and worldwide as video on demand on the IDream Motion Pictures YouTube Channel.
