= Soham Chakrabarty =

Soham S Chakravarty
- Born: Kolkata
- Occupation: Singer
- Years active: 2000–present

Soham S Chakravarty is a playback singer who has sung many songs for Bollywood movies as well as for Bengali movies. He was declared the winner of Zee's "Sa-re-ga-ma"(A musical competition) in the year 2000 (at the age of 20). Till now his big hit is "In Dino" song from the movie Life in A... Metro and "Khudaya Khair" from the movie Billu Barber.

== Early life ==
Soham was born to a Bengali family, and started singing at the age of ten. He was trained extensively in Hindustani classical music under the tutelage of Pandit Jayanta Bose. He later received guidance from Ustad Mohammed Sagaruddin Khan' saab , Sukhdev Sengupta', and , Ajoy Das. Music directors Bappi Lahiri and O P Nayyar suggested to him that if he wanted to pursue singing as a career, he'd have to shift base to Mumbai. Since then he started living in Mumbai. He came to Mumbai in 2002.

== Career ==
He has been through a lot of struggle. He sang for Ada and Dil Samander (Garam Masala) ads though that was finally dubbed by Sonu Nigam and KK, respectively. He has done several ad jingles like Emami and Mc Donalds with music director Pritam. T-Series gave him his first break in 13 languages including Telugu, Tamil, Bhojpuri and Assamese. He has sung many Hindi and Bengali songs for Bollywood movies and Bengali movies, respectively. He has also sung devotional songs with popular singers like Debashish, Preeti, Pinky, Javed Ali, Charanjeet Singh Sondhi, Kalpana, Priya Bhattacharya, etc.

== Filmography ==
=== Hindi Songs ===
==== 2006 ====
Film	Song	Co-singer(s)
Dhoom 2	"Dil Laga Na"	Mahalakshmi Iyer, Suzanne D'Mello

==== 2007 ====
Film	Song	Co-singer(s)
Life in A... Metro	"In Dino"	
Hattrick	"Kahan Kho Gaya – Reprise"	
Hattrick	"Kahaan Kho Gaya Hai Dil Mera"	
Dhol	"O Yaara Dhol Bajaake"	Sohail Kaul

==== 2009 ====
Film	Song	Co-singer(s)
Ajab Prem Ki Ghazab Kahani	"Tu Jaane Na (Reprise)"	
Bolo Raam	"Do Dil Hai Janwa "	Monali Thakur
3 Nights 4 Days	"Har Mausam"	Akriti Kakar
All the Best: Fun Begins	"All the best"	Antara Mitra
Shaabash! You Can Do It	"You Can Do It Shaabash"	
Shaabash! You Can Do It	"Lagta Nahi Dil"	
Life Partner	"Teri Meri Yeh Zindagi"	Shreya Ghoshal
Life Partner	"Aage Aage"	Mika Singh, Antara Mitra
Billu	"Khudaya khair"	Monali Thakur, Akriti Kakar

==== 2010 ====
Film	Song	Co-singer(s)
Toh Baat Pakki!	"Karle Mujhse Pyaar – Remix"	Pritam Chakraborty
Do Dilon Ke Khel Mein	"Ajnabee Ehsas Ko"	
Chance Pe Dance	"Pal Mein Hi"	Shreya Ghoshal

==== 2012 ====
Film	Song	Co-singer(s)
Love Possible	"Pehli Dafa Hai (Unplugged)"	
Love Possible	"Pehli Dafa Hai"	
Yeh Khula Aasmaan	"Tum Mile"	Gayatri Ganjawala

==== 2025 ====
Film	Song	Co-singer(s)
Saira Khan Case	"Dagabaaz Piya"	

=== Bengali songs ===
==== 2002 ====
Film	Song	Co-singer(s)
Kurukshetra	"Jaago Bhai Notun Kore"	Vinod Rathod, Priya Bhattacharya

==== 2006 ====
Film	Song	Co-singer(s)
Agni Pariksha	"Jeo Na Amay Chhere"	
Eri Naam Prem	"Bhalobashar Ei Jibon"	Shreya Ghoshal

==== 2007 ====
Film	Song	Co-singer(s)
Jiban Sathi	"Aaj Tomake Tomar Theke"	Sadhana Sargam

==== 2008 ====
Film	Song	Co-singer(s)
Bor Asbe Ekhuni	"Saiyaan (Male)"	
Bor Asbe Ekhuni	"Baba Aamar Biye Hobe Na"	
	"Tomake Na Lekha Chithita"	
Love	"Prithibi Onek Boro"	Monali Thakur

==== 2009 ====
Film	Song	Co-singer(s)
Bhalobasa Jindabad	"Aamar Bhalobasa Jitbei"	Anweshaa
Bhalobasa Jindabad	"Tumi Samne Achho"	June Banerjee
Bhalobasa Jindabad	"O Golap Tumi Aaj Gandho Dio"	June Banerjee

==== 2010 ====
Film	Song	Co-singer(s)
Bondhu Eso Tumi	"Ei Mon Shono Na Kichhu Katha Bolchhe"	Sanchita Bhattacharya
Mon Niye	"Jonaki Mon"	Zubeen Garg
Love Circus	"Tomake Chai"	Pamela Jain

==== 2011 ====
Film	Song	Co-singer(s)
Bindas Prem	"Ki Aagun Jele Dile"	Sneha Pant
Bindas Prem	"Ei Duniyai Koto Kichi Hoy"	June Banerjee
Achena Prem	"Kar Monete Ki Swapno"	
Shotru	"Ore O Baul Mon"	Monali Thakur, Javed Ali
Shotru	"Rakhe Hori"	Javed Ali
Fight 1:1	"Let's Go"	Anweshaa
Fight 1:1	"Tumi Haat Barale"	Anweshaa
Fight 1:1	"Eka Hote Chai"	
Fighter: Marbo Noy Morbo	"Nana Ronge (Sad)"	

==== 2012 ====
Film	Song	Co-singer(s)
Passport (2012 film)	Jibonta Rekhe Baji	

== Accolades ==
Year	Award	Category	Film	Result	Ref
2000	Zee TV's Sa Re Ga Ma 2000	Winner in Grand Finale		Won	
2008	Screen Award 2008	Screen Award for Best Playback Singer – Male	Life in A... Metro	Won	
