= Maanvi Gagroo =

Indian actress (born 1985)

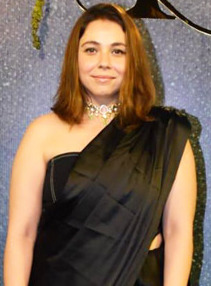
- Gagroo in 2023
- Born: New Delhi, India
- Education: The Mother's International School, Gargi College (University of Delhi)
- Occupation: Actress
- Years active: 2007–present
- Known for: TVF Tripling; Four More Shots Please!
- Spouse: Kumar Varun (m. 2023)

Maanvi Gagroo (born September 5, 1985) is an Indian actress who appears in Hindi films and television, She has worked in various web series like TVF Pitchers, TVF Tripling, and Four More Shots Please!. At the 2023 Filmfare OTT Awards, she won Filmfare OTT Award for Best Actress in a Comedy Series for her performance in the TVF Tripling Season 3.

== Personal life and background ==
Maanvi Gagroo was born in a Kashmiri Pandit family to Surender and Urmil Gagroo in New Delhi. She went to The Mother's International School, New Delhi and earned her bachelor’s degree in psychology from Gargi College, University of Delhi. Maanvi married Kumar Varun on 23 February 2023 in a private ceremony.

== Career ==
Gagroo began her career with the Disney Channel's television show Dhoom Machaao Dhoom in 2007. She is known for her work in web series like TVF Pitchers, TVF Tripling, Made in Heaven and Four More Shots Please!. In 2019, she portrayed the character of 'Apsara', a plus size woman in a comedy movie Ujda Chaman opposite Sunny Singh, for which she wore a fat suit. She has worked with Ayushmann Khurrana in Shubh Mangal Zyada Saavdhan. The film deals with the subject of same-sex love and Maanvi played the role of a 'quirky bride'. In 2023, Maanvi Gagroo won the Filmfare OTT Award for Best Actor, Series (Female): Comedy.

Heer Sara is her upcoming Indian Hindi-language film written and directed by Kartik Chaudhry. It stars Gagroo, Patralekhaa, Shveta Salve and Arif Zakaria. The movie, also known as Heer Sara Aur Pondicherry, is a female-based road-trip drama, which is primarily about live journey of two young women from Indore—Heer and Sara, along their motorcycle journey from Indore to Pondicherry. Many things happen during the journey, which form the basis of this movie.

== Filmography ==
=== Films ===
†	Denotes films that have not yet been released

Year	Title	Role	Notes	Ref.
2008	The Cheetah Girls: One World		English film	
2009	Aamras:The Sweet Taste of Friendship	Rakhi Chadha		
2011	No One Killed Jessica	Aditi		
2012	?: A Question Mark	Maanvi		
2013	Life Reboot Nahi Hoti			
2014	Kill Dil	Jenny		
2014	PK	Meetu Singh		
2016	Tu Hai Mera Sunday	Vinta		
2017	Guy in the Sky	Mehak		
2019	Ujda Chaman	Apsara Batra		
2019	377 AbNormal	Shalmalee		
2020	Shubh Mangal Zyada Saavdhan	Rajni "Goggle" Tripathi		
2026	Heer Sara	Heer		

=== Television ===
Year	Title	Role	Notes	Ref.
2007	Dhoom Machaao Dhoom	Ambika ‘Bikki’ Gill		
2015–2022	TVF Pitchers	Shreya		
2016–2022	TVF Tripling	Chanchal Sharma	3 seasons	
2016	Permanent Roommates	Shivani Chhabra	Season 2; Episode: "The Dinner"	
2018	The Good Vibes	Jonitha Tripathi		
2019–present	Four More Shots Please!	Siddhi Patel		
2019	Made in Heaven	Tarana Ali	Season 1; Episode: "Pride and Bridezilla"	
2019	Tamashree	Tamashree		
2023-2024	Half Love Half Arranged	Riya Tanwar	Season 1 & 2	

== Awards and nominations ==
Year	Award	Category	Work	Result	Ref.
2019	IReel Awards	Best Actress (Comedy)	TVF Tripling 2	Nominated	
2020	Filmfare OTT Awards	Best Actress - Comedy	Four More Shots Please! 2	Nominated	
2021	Filmfare Awards	Best Supporting Actress	Shubh Mangal Zyada Saavdhan	Nominated	
2023	Filmfare OTT Awards	Best Actress - Comedy	TVF Tripling 3	Won	
