= Passport (2012 film) =

2012 film

- Directed by: Raj Mukherjee
- Starring: Ferdous Ahmed; Gargi Raychowdhury; Pratik Sen; Pamela; Ritu Sarkhel; Mainak Banerjee; Rajesh Sharma; Tanishka; Jagannath Guha; Joy Badlani; Murali Mohan
- Music by: Subhayu Bedajna
- Release date: 2012
- Country: India
- Language: Bengali

Passport (Bengali: পাসপোর্ট) is a 2012 Bengali film directed by Raj Mukherjee with Ferdous Ahmed, Pratik Sen and Gargi Raychowdhury. The film's music was composed by Subhayu Bedajna.

== Cast ==
- Ferdous Ahmed
- Gargi Raychowdhury
- Pratik Sen
- Pamela Mundol
- Ritu Sarkhel
- Joy Badlani
- Mainak Banerjee
- Rajesh Sharma

== Soundtrack ==
Track	Song	Artist	Music
1	Jibonta Rekhe Baji	Soham Chakraborty; Shahid Maliya	Subhayu Bedajna
2	Ghum Ghum Ratre	Shaan; Pamela Jain	Subhayu Bedajna
3	Mone Ki Jantrana	Javed Ali	Subhayu Bedajna
4	Aaj Chokhe Chokhe	Kunal Ganjawala; June Banerjee	Subhayu Bedajna
5	Chumma De	Kalpana	Subhayu Bedajna
