= Sonam Mukherjee =

Indian film actress and model

Sonam Mukherjee (born Mumbai, India) is an Indian actress and fashion model.

Mukherjee was a finalist at the I Am She-Miss Universe India beauty pageant in 2010. She made her acting debut in the Hindi film ?: A Question Mark, released in 2012. She was praised for her role as Simran, who becomes a victim of ghostly entities. Her portrayal of a possessed girl earned her a nomination in the Best Supporting Actress category at the St. Tropez International France film festival in 2014.

Mukherjee attended school in Mumbai at St. Joseph's Convent, Bandra. She graduated with a degree in Chemistry from Wilson College, Mumbai, where she played field hockey. She currently trains in Kathak dance under dancer Shila Mehta.
