= Chandan Roy Sanyal =

Indian actor (born 1980)

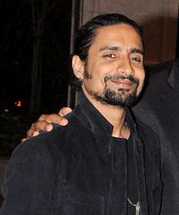
- Sanyal in 2012
- Born: New Delhi, India
- Education: Zakir Husain College
- Occupations: Actor, Model
- Years active: 2006–present

Chandan Roy Sanyal (born 30 January 1980) is an Indian actor who is known for his work in the Hindi and Bengali language films of India. After graduating with a degree in mathematics, he made his acting debut in the 2006 film Rang de Basanti, in a minor role. He then received critical acclaim for his supporting roles in the 2009 action film Kaminey and in his Bengali debut, the 2010 film Mahanagar@Kolkata. Sanyal then went on to receive recognition for his performances in the 2012 Bengali drama film Aparajita Tumi and as an insomniac artist in the 2013 romantic drama Prague.

== Early life ==
Born and brought up in Delhi, Sanyal hails from a Bengali family. Chandan studied at Raisina Bengali School and then Zakir Husain College, where he received an honors degree in mathematics.

== Career ==
Sanyal made his debut as Batukeshwar Dutt in 2006's Rakeysh Omprakash Mehra film Rang De Basanti but his big break came with Vishal Bhardwaj's 2009 movie Kaminey where he got a lot of appreciation from the critics as well as audience.

Chandan also did an excellent job in the latest 2012 film "Aparajita Tumi". He has been signed on as one of the two leads in the film Kaanchi.

== Filmography ==
=== Films ===
Year	Film	Role	Language	Notes
2006	Rang De Basanti	Batukeshwar Dutt	Hindi	
2007	Viva Sunita!		Hindi	Short film
2009	Kaminey	Mikhail	Hindi	Nominated—Stardust Award for Breakthrough Performance - Male
2010	Mahanagar@Kolkata	Rohit	Bengali	
2011	F.A.L.T.U	Vishnu Vardhan	Hindi	
2011	Tell Me O Kkhuda	Kuki	Hindi	
2012	Aparajita Tumi	Ranojoy	Bengali	
2012	Love You To Death	Atul Sinha	Hindi	
2012	Staying Alive	Altaf Ali	Hindi	
2012	Midnight's Children	Joseph D'Costa	English	
2013	Ganesh Talkies	Arjun	Bengali	
2013	D-Day	Iqbal Seth's Nephew	Hindi	
2013	Prague	Chandan	Hindi	
2014	Kaanchi...	Ratan Lal Bagula	Hindi	
2014	Mango	Sylvie	Hindi	Post-production
2015	Jazbaa	Niyaaz Sheikh	Hindi	
2015	Bangistan	Tamim Hussain	Hindi	
2017	Mirza Juuliet	Rajan	Hindi	
2017	Tope	Goja	Bengali	
2017	Chef	Najrul	Hindi	
2017	Jab Harry Met Sejal	Ghyassuddin Mohammed Qureshi	Hindi	
2019	The Sholay Girl	Asim	Hindi	Released on ZEE5
2019	Jabariya Jodi	Guddu	Hindi	
2019	Urojahaj	Bachchu	Bengali	
2020	Rawkto Rawhoshyo	Shammo	Bengali	
2021	Sanak	Saju	Hindi	
2021	Deep6		Bengali	
2022	Woh 3 Din		Hindi	
2024	Patna Shuklla	Neelkanth Misra	Hindi	
2025	Binodiini: Ekti Natir Upakhyan	Ramakrishna	Bengali	
2026	Last Man in Tower	Mr. Ajwani	Hindi	

=== Web series ===
Year	Title	Role	Language	Network	Notes
2019	Parchhayee	Somesh	Hindi	ZEE5	
2019	Bhram	Police Inspector	Hindi	ZEE5	
2020	Aashram	Swami Bhupendra Singh (Bhuppa Swami)	Hindi	MX Player	
2020	Forbidden Love		Hindi	ZEE5	
2021	Mai Hero Boll Raha Hu	Mastaan	Hindi	ZEE5	
2021	Ray		Hindi	Netflix	
2022	Gadhedo: Donkey	Maatsa	Hindi	Amazon Prime Video	
2023	Charlie Chopra	Manas Debral	Hindi	SonyLIV	
2023	Shehar Lakhot	Kairav	Hindi	Amazon Prime Video	
2024	Lootere	Ajay Kotwal	Hindi	Disney+ Hotstar	
2024	36 Days	Tony Walia	Hindi	SonyLIV	
