= Haatchhani =

- Directed by: Gourishankar Sarkhel
- Story by: Subrata Bhadra & Gourishankar Sarkhel
- Produced by: Mihir Kanti Biswas
- Cinematography: Pradip Chakraborty
- Music by: ilip Das
- Release date: February 2012
- Running time: 142 minutes
- Country: India
- Language: Bengali

HaatChhani (Bengali: হাত ছানি, Beckon: Becon) is a Bengali thriller film directed and written by Gourishankar Sarkhel. The film was produced by Mihir Kanti Biswas under Labu Film International

Song	Singer(s)	Duration	Notes
"Ki Bhabe Shajabo"	Shaan	3:36	
"Modhu Adhar Bhora Jamini"	Subhomita	3:57	
"Pagol E Ki"	June Bannerjee	4:39	
"E Ki Shur Baje re"	Subhomita & Dilip	4:57	
"Ojana Ahoban"	Subhomita	5:56	
"Opaare Maya"	Shreya Ghoshal & Raghab	6:01	
