= Chinna Thambi (TV series) =

Indian Tamil-language soap opera

- Genre: Soap opera
- Directed by: Arul Rasan (1-50); Francis Kadhiravan (51- 442)
- Creative directors: Manivasakan; Selvaraj; Rajan.M; Boopalan.S
- Starring: Prajin; Pavani Reddy
- Theme music composer: Ilayavan; Kiran
- Opening theme: Ilayavan
- Country of origin: India
- Original language: Tamil
- No. of episodes: 442

Production
- Executive producers: Thillainathan. K Senthil Mohan Ponnaiah
- Producer: Raja vel
- Cinematography: Ramesh.D
- Editor: P.Arunkumar
- Camera setup: Multi-camera
- Running time: 22 minutes
- Production company: A Tele Factory

Original release
- Network: Star Vijay
- Release: 2 October 2017 – 21 June 2019

Related
- Khokababu

Chinna Thambi is a 2017 Indian Tamil-language soap opera starring Prajin and Pavani Reddy. It aired from 2 October 2017 to 21 June 2019 on Vijay TV for 442 episodes. It is a remake of Bengali language serial Khokababu.

The story about the relationship of an innocent village boy as Chinna Thambi and an arrogant city girl as Nandhini, who fall in love after marriage.

== Plot ==
It is a story about Chinna Thambi (Prajin), an innocent village boy from Chinnalapatti who falls in love with Nandhini (Pavani Reddy), an arrogant girl from Chennai. Chinna Thambi is very naive, having moral values. He obeys his mother Annalakshmi sternly and loves his family. On the other side, Nandhini is opposite like Chinnathambi, But Nandhini has a good heart.

Nandhini's marriage is fixed with Gautham (Lokesh), and they get engaged. Coincidentally, one day Chinna Thambi and Nandhini meet and get into a heated argument. Chinna Thambi keeps himself away from Nandhini because he is a Baal Brahmachari. And Nandhini too dislikes him. Will they become friends and love each other? Will their love overcome their contrasting personalities, cultures, and values?

On the day of marriage, Gautham is arrested for a false accusation, and a fainted Nandhini marries Chinnathambi, on the request of her parents. Then, Nandhini moves to the village with Chinnathambi. Swetha accompanies Nandhini to help her get accustomed to the new environment. At first, Nandini hates her life in the town, with small issues such as not being able to eat meat, or wear modern clothes. One day, her father-in-law (Chinnathambi's dad) hears her speak badly of chinnathambi's looks. She remarks on the clothes and hair he has, saying he has a priest's look. Her father-in-law brings Chinnathambi and changes his looks into something more modern, which shocks everyone in the house, including Nandini and chinnathambi's mother.

== Cast ==
=== Main ===
- Prajin as Chinna Thambi
- Pavani Reddy as Nandhini

=== Recurring ===
- Girish as Rathnasamy (China Thambi's father)
- Anila Sreekumar as Annalakshmi (Annam) (Chinna Thambi's mother, Malar's adoptive mother)
- Rheema as Malar (Chinnathambi's cousin)
- Kammapandi as Samudram (Malar's father, Chinnathambi's uncle)
- Shwetha as Revathy (Chinna Thambi's cousin)
- Rekha Suresh as Shanthi (Malar's mother and Chinnathambi's aunt)
- Shridhar as Rajasekar (Nandhini, Arvind's father)
- Sadhana as Prabhavathi (Nandhini and Arvind's mother)
- Krishna Kishore as Nandini's elder brother
- Shwetha Venkat as Shwetha (Nandini's sister-in-law)
- Aravish / VJ Pappu as Aravind (Pappu) (Nandhini's younger brother)
- Krithika as Varsha (Nandini's cousin)
- Priya as Kanchana (Varsha's mother and Nandhini's aunt)
- Lokesh Bhaskaran as Gautham Vasudevan
- Britto as Seval (Chinnathambi's friend)
- Hema Rajkumar as Sevanthi (episode 174–272)
- Subageetha as Shenbagam (Sevvanthi's sister, episode 174–273)
- Suresh as Sethu (Shenbagam's husband, episode 174–270)
- Udhay as Lingam (a man who gives loan for auto, died in serial)
- Suryakanth as Chiyaan
- Andrew Jesudoss as Paramasivam
- Vadivukkarasi as Kadambavanathu Amma
- Sairatheya as Damayenthi (devotee of Kadambavanathu Amma)
- Karthik as Kaali - Wrestler
- Priya as Sathya (Nandhini's friend)
- Ravishankar / Ravi Varma as Vasudevan (Gautham's father)
- Uma Rani (Gautham's mother)
- Nithin as Ashwin
- Chetna as Preethi
- Franklin as Appu (Nandhini's friend)
- Sharanya Turadi Sundarraj (episode 120–121)
- Myna Nandhini as Alabarai Myna (episode 335 - 370)

== Production ==
=== Casting ===
The series is a village love story. Prajin, formerly of the series Anjali and Kadhalikka Neramillai plays the lead male role, and Pavani of the serial Rettai Vaal Kuruvi, EMI-Thavanai Murai Vazhkai, and Vajram movie plays the lead female role. Kalyanam Mudhal Kadhal Varai fame Lokesh was selected to the role of Gautham (Nandhini's Fiancé) and Saravanan Meenatchi (season 2) fame Priya and Franklin were selected to the role of Sathya and Appu.

=== Title ===
This title was taken from a 1991 Chinna Thambi movie starring Prabhu and Khushbu. The English translation of the title is Little Brother.

=== Development ===
On 23 September 2017, the first promo of the show one minute 'Promo 1' was released by Vijay TV on YouTube.

== Awards and nominations ==
Year	Award	Category	Recipient	Role	Result
2018	Galatta Nakshathra Awards	Best Actor	Prajin	Chinna Thambi	Nominated
2018	Galatta Nakshathra Awards	Best Pair	Prajin & Pavani	Chinna Thambi & Nandhini	Nominated
2018	4th Vijay Television Awards	Favourite Actor Female	Pavani	Nandhini	Nominated
2018	4th Vijay Television Awards	Best Supporting Actor Female	Swetha	Swetha	Nominated
2018	4th Vijay Television Awards	Best Dop	Ramesh		Nominated
2018	4th Vijay Television Awards	Favourite Fiction Series	Chinna Thambi		Nominated
2018	4th Vijay Television Awards	Best Crew Fiction	Chinna Thambi		Won
2018	4th Vijay Television Awards	Favourite Negative Role	Krithika	Varsha	Nominated
2018	4th Vijay Television Awards	Favourite Comedian Fiction	Selva		Nominated
2018	4th Vijay Television Awards	Favourite Comedian Fiction	Britto		Nominated
2018	4th Vijay Television Awards	Favourite Mother	Anila Sreekumar	Annalakshmi	Won
2018	4th Vijay Television Awards	Favourite Mamiyar	Shari (Sadhana)	Pirabhavathi	Nominated
2018	4th Vijay Television Awards	Favourite Screen Pair	Prajin & Pavani	Chinna Thambi & Nandhini	Won
2018	4th Vijay Television Awards	Favourite Family	Chinna Thambi		Nominated
2018	4th Vijay Television Awards	Best Director			Nominated
2018	4th Vijay Television Awards	Best Father	Girish	Rathnasamy	Nominated
2019	5th Vijay Television Award	Best Son	Prajin	Chinnathambi	Won

== Adaptations ==
Language	Title	Original release	Network(s)	Last aired	Notes
Bengali	Khokababu খোকাবাবু	9 May 2016	Star Jalsha	29 July 2018	Original
Tamil	Chinna Thambi சின்னத்தம்பி	2 October 2017	Star Vijay	21 June 2019	Remake
Telugu	Savitramma Gari Abbayi సావిత్రిమమాగరి అబ్బాయి	11 March 2019	Star Maa	28 August 2021	Remake
Hindi	Amma Ke Babu Ki Baby अम्मा के बाबू की बेबी	8 February 2021	Star Bharat	31 May 2021	Remake
