= Pratik Sen =

Indian film and television actor

- Born: Chitrankar Sen; 6 May 1985 (age 41); Kolkata, India
- Known for: Actor - Films & Television
- Notable work: Sohra Bridge (2016); Khokababu (TV series) (2016); Mohor (TV series) (2019); Atithi (2019); Shaheber Chithi (2022); Uraan (TV Series) (2024); Amader Dadamoni (TV series) (2025)
- Awards: West Bengal Tele Academy Award; 2025 Best Actor; 2022 Best Actor; 2018 Best Actor

Chitrankar Sen (born 6 May 1985), known professionally as Pratik Sen, is an Indian film and television actor, who works predominantly in the Bengali film industry.

== Early life ==
Pratik was born in Kolkata, India to Anuradha Sen. He grew up in Deoghar, Jharkhand. His family has a history of association with the film industry. He is the grandson of Bijalibaran Sen (Director of the 1961 Bengali Film "Manik") and Amar Dutta (lead actor of Bengali film "Subhash Chandra") and great-grandson of Debaki Kumar Bose (Director of the Bengali Film "Seeta").

== Careers ==
Pratik started his career with the South Eastern Railways in India. He was three times state-level boxing champion in heavy-weight category between 2002 and 2004. He quit boxing to pursue a career as an actor. Pratik is well regarded for his versatile acting performances in both, television and films.

=== Film career ===
Pratik made his acting debut in 2009 with the film Amar Bodyguard directed by Haranath Chakraborty. The release of Amar Bodyguard was delayed, hence, Prem Bandhan became his first release in a lead role in 2009. His next Bengali films were Om Shanti, Passport and Dekha Hulo Dujonay.

In 2015, he worked with late Bappaditya Bandyopadhyay in Sohra Bridge which was an official selection in the Indian Panorama section at the 46th International Film Festival of India.

He then appeared in Clapstick and Chol Kuntal in lead roles, where he shared screen space with two thespians, Soumitra Chatterjee and Deepankar De.

In 2018, Pratik starred alongside Rituparna Sengupta in Tarun Majumdar's Bhalobasar Bari where he played the lead. The film went onto complete 50 days at the box office. He worked once again with Rituparna in the 2019 Sujit Paul film, Atithi. Atithi went onto complete 58 consecutive houseful shows at Nandan, Kolkata.

=== Television career ===
Pratik made his television debut on Star Jalsha in the 2016 comedy-drama Khokababu by Blues Productions where he portrayed the titular character. He was paired opposite Trina Saha, who also made her debut with the serial. His portrayal of 'Khoka', an innocent wrestler with strong family ties won him his first Government of West Bengal Tele Academy Award for Best Actor.

After Khokababu, he took a break from television.

In 2019, he returned to television with Magic Moments Motion Pictures family drama Mohor as the male protagonist. His portrayal of the emotionally complex character, 'Shankhodip Ray Chowdhury (Shankho)' won him his second Government of West Bengal Tele Academy Award for Best Actor.

His next show was Acropoliis Entertainment's Shaheber Chithi where he was the lead. In February 2023, he joined the cast of Magic Moments Motion Pictures serial Ekka Dokka in a cameo role but went onto play a parallel lead role as the story progressed.

After an eight-month hiatus, Pratik returned to the small screen in May 2024 as the lead in Surinder Films’ serial "Uraan", alongside debutante Ratnapriya Das. Their on-screen pairing was appreciated by audiences. Uraan completed its journey in early March 2025.

In July 2025, Pratik returned to television with the serial Amader Dadamoni on Zee Bangla, produced by Nilanjana Sengupta's 'Nini Chini's Mamma's Production House', playing the titular role "Dadamoni" paired with Anushkaa Chakraborty. This marked his first collaboration with Zee Bangla, indicating a new phase in his television career. For Amader Dadamoni, Pratik clinched his third West Bengal Tele Academy Best Actor Award in 2025, a role layered with complexity, depth, and emotional nuance, giving him the perfect canvas to stretch his repertoire as an artist.

Between 2022 and 2023, Pratik also hosted the culinary show ‘Bhojohari Ranna’, produced by Rana Sarkar for OTT platform Dhoomketu - during which he interviewed celebrities while preparing a dish.

=== Music career ===
Pratik crooned the title track for the culinary show 'Bhojohori Ranna'.

== Filmography ==
=== Films ===
| Year | Film | Language | Role | Notes | Ref |
|---|---|---|---|---|---|
| 2009 | Prem Bandhan | Bengali | Prem | Directed by Biswanath Chakraborty. With Koyel Banerjee, Dulal Lahiri, Ashok Mukherjee | |
| 2012 | Om Shanti | Bengali | Arko | Directed by Satapdi Roy. With Victor Banerjee, Tapas Paul, Rituparna Sengupta, Samiksha | |
| 2012 | Passport | Bengali | Rahul | Directed by Raaj Mukherjee. With Ferdous Ahmed, Gargi Raychowdhury, Pamela Mundol | |
| 2013 | Dekha Holo Dujonay | Bengali | Sunny | Directed by Manas Basu. With Veer Sikandar and Tina Datta | |
| 2013 | Amar Bodyguard | Bengali | Anol | Debut Film. Directed by Haranath Chakraborty. With Riddhima Ghosh and Tapas Paul | |
| 2015 | Sohra Bridge | Multilingual | Asish | Directed by Bappaditya Bandopadhyay, with Niharika Singh, Barun Chanda, Nishita Goswami | |
| 2016 | Clapstick | Bengali | Anirudh | Directed by Biswanath Chakraborty. With Soumitra Chatterjee, Deepankar De, Kinni Modak | |
| 2017 | Chol Kuntal | Bengali | Bishuda | Directed by Raaj Mukherjee. With Soumitra Chatterjee, Anuradha Roy, Dolon Roy, Deepankar De | |
| 2018 | Bhalobasar Bari | Bengali | Kalyan | Directed by Tarun Majumdar. With Rituparna Sengupta, Dwijin Banerjeee, Shilajit Mazumdar | |
| 2019 | Atithi | Bengali | Dr. Arindam | Directed by Sujit Paul. With Rituparna Sengupta, Saayoni Ghosh, Nishan Nanaiah, Subhasish Mukherjee, Manoj Mitra | |

=== Television ===
| Year | Title | Role | Channel | Co-Actress/ Co-Actor | Ref |
|---|---|---|---|---|---|
| 2016–2018 | Khokababu | Khoka/ Raghunath Mukherjee | Star Jalsha | Trina Saha | |
| 2019– 2022 | Mohor | Sankhodip "Sankho" Roy Chowdhury | Star Jalsha | Sonamoni Saha | |
| 2022– 2023 | Shaheber Chithi | Shaheb Mukherjee | Star Jalsha | Debchandrima Singha Roy | |
| 2022– 2023 | Ekka Dokka | Dr.Anirban Guha | Star Jalsha | Sonamoni Saha, Saptarishi Maulik | |
| 2024– 2025 | Uraan | Maharaj née Rigved Mukherjee | Star Jalsha | Ratnapriya Das | |
| 2025–2026 | Amader Dadamoni | Dadamoni née Someshwar Dutta (Som) | Zee Bangla | Anushkaa Chakraborty | |

== Awards and nominations ==
Only awards won are given in the table
| Year | Award | Award Category | Work | Ref |
|---|---|---|---|---|
| 2017 | 16th Tele Cine Awards* | Best Actor | Khokababu | |
| 2017 | Tele Academy Award | Best Actor | Khokababu | |
| 2017 | Tele Academy Award | Priyo Juti (Best Pair) | Khokababu | |
| 2017 | Star Jalsha Parivaar Award | Priyo Bor (Favorite Husband) | Khokababu | |
| 2017 | Star Jalsha Parivaar Award | Priyo Juti (Best Pair) | Khokababu | |
| 2018 | Tele Academy Award | Best Actor | Khokababu | |
| 2018 | Tele Academy Award | Best Jodi (Best Pair) | Khokababu | |
| 2018 | Star Jalsha Parivaar Award | Best Bor (Favorite Husband) | Khokababu | |
| 2021 | Star Jalsha Parivaar Award | Priyo Jamai (Favorite Son-in-law) | Mohor | |
| 2021 | Kolkata Glitz Awards | Notable Performance Male (Popular Choice) | Mohor | |
| 2021 | Kolkata Glitz Awards | Best Juti (Best Pair) - Popular Choice | Mohor | |
| 2022 | Tele Academy Award | Best Actor | Mohor | |
| 2022 | Star Jalsha Parivaar Awards | Best Juti (Best Pair) - Jury Choice | Mohor | |
| 2022 | Star Jalsha Parivaar Awards | Priyo Chele | Mohor | |
| 2022 | Star Jalsha Parivaar Awards | Hall of Fame | Mohor | |
| 2022 | Telly Adda Award | All Time Favourite Actor | Mohor | |
| 2023 | Kolkata Glitz Awards | Best Juti (Best Pair) - Popular Choice | Mohor | |
| 2025 | Star Jalsha Parivaar Award | Priyo Dada/ Priyo Bhai | Uraan | |
| 2025 | Tele Academy Awards 2025 | Best Actor | Amader Dadamoni | |
| 2025 | Tele Academy Awards 2025 | Priyo Bhai | Amader Dadamoni | |
| 2026 | Zee Bangla Sonar Sansar Award | Priyo Jamai | Amader Dadamoni | |

*Tele Cine Awards is organised by Tele Cine Society, a non profitable organization formed by the Journalists of West Bengal

**Tele Academy Awards organised by Government of West Bengal, Information & Broadcasting Ministry.

*** Star Jalsha Parivaar Awards is an event that celebrates relationships and family bonding and felicitates the best on-screen performances of characters from the shows on the Star Jalsha television channel. There is no published list of nominations and winners prior to 2022. The award functions of 2017, 2018, 2021 can be viewed on Hotstar channel.

== Other Ventures ==
In 2021, Pratik opened a multi-cuisine restaurant, Face Time Continental in Kolkata.
