= Niharika Singh =

Indian actress

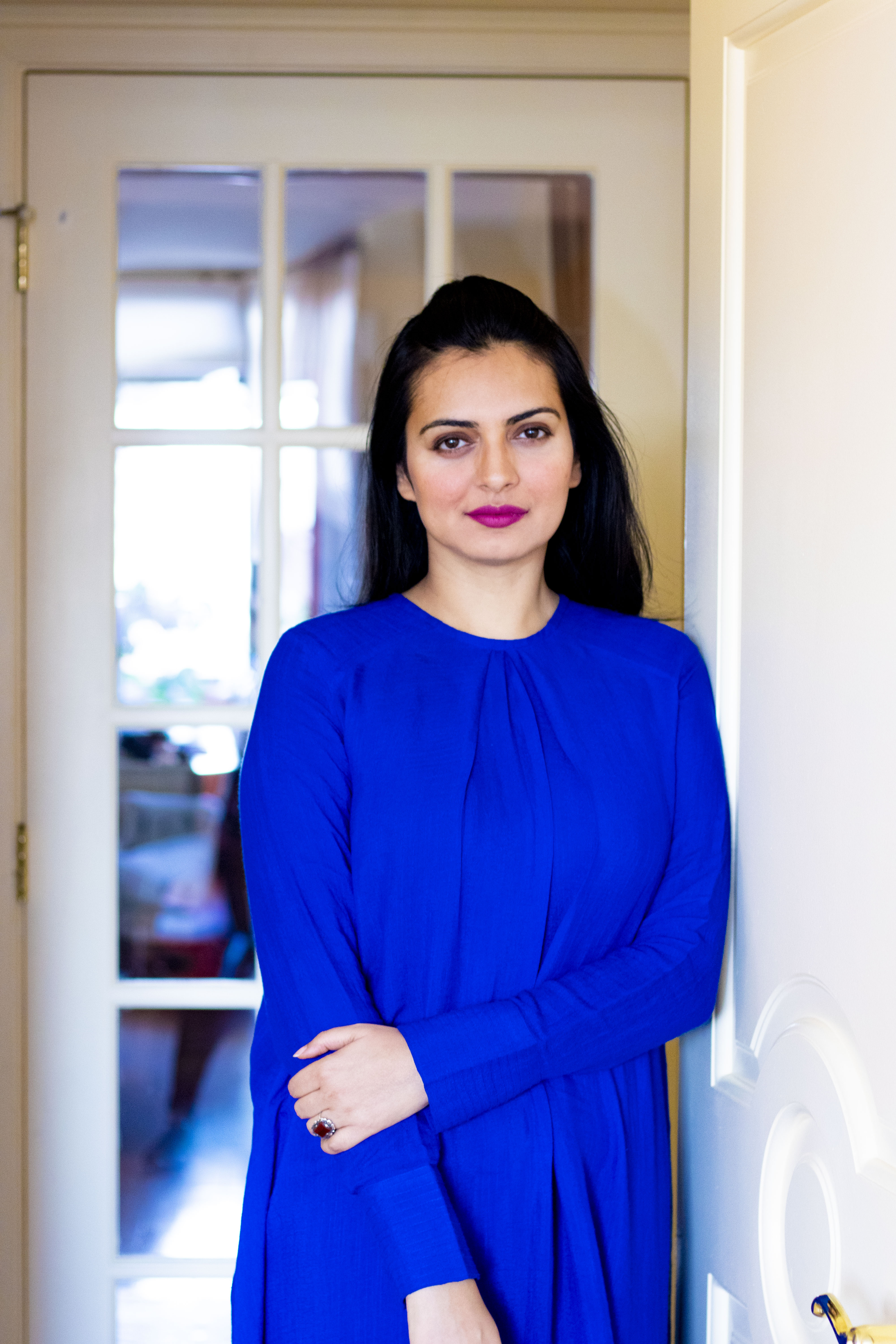
- Niharika Singh in 2019
- Born: New Delhi, India
- Education: Shri Ram College of Commerce (dropped out)
- Occupation: Actress • Filmmaker
- Beauty pageant titleholder
- Title: Miss Earth India 2005
- Major competitions: Femina Miss India, Miss Earth 2005

Niharika Singh is an Indian film actress, producer and beauty pageant titleholder who won Miss Earth India and represented India at Miss Earth 2005. She made her acting debut with the critically acclaimed film Miss Lovely, which competed in Un Certain Regard at the 2012 Cannes Film Festival. An alumnus of Berlinale Talents 2016, Singh turned producer with Class (2023 TV series).

== Early life ==
Born on August 31, 1982 in New Delhi, Niharika spent her childhood in various north Indian towns and hill stations, moving homes every few years. Her father worked in the Tourism department for Uttar Pradesh and later Uttarakhand state government, her mother ran a design institute in New Delhi and she is the elder of two sisters. Singh did most of her schooling in an all-girls boarding school in Nainital.

== Career ==
=== Modeling and pageantry (1999–2006) ===
Singh started working as a model in 1999 when she first walked the ramp for a design institute in Dehradun. She went on to pursue a degree in B.Com. (Hons) at Shri Ram College of Commerce in New Delhi and continued taking modelling assignments alongside to earn a little income. Niharika featured in several print campaigns, fashion magazines, music videos and decided to drop out of college and move to Mumbai to pursue a full-time career in the entertainment business in 2003.

Singh participated in Femina Miss India in 2005 and finished third, winning the title of Miss Earth India along with subtitles for Miss Photogenic and Miss Beautiful Hair & was sent to represent India at Miss Earth 2005 held in the Philippines. She appeared in several television commercials and ad campaigns for various brands across the country and hosted a reality TV series Banungi Main Miss India with the Femina Miss India contestants of 2006. Singh featured in Times of India's 2005 list of Most Desirable Women and continued her modeling career until she started getting offers to act in Bollywood films.

=== Acting in film (2006–2026) ===
Niharika's film career began in 2006 when she signed a 10-film contract with Bollywood director Raj Kanwar under his banner Inderjit Films. The films were never made and she remained locked in the contract until singer Himesh Reshammiya approached her to play the role of a haughty heiress opposite him in A New Love Ishtory to be produced by T-Series (company) and directed by John Matthew Matthan. Niharika attended an acting course with Barry John (theatre director) before filming A New Love Ishtory. Due to internal differences during the making of the film, producer Bhushan Kumar pulled the finance, dubbed the unfinished version and sold the film directly to a television channel without the knowledge of the cast and crew. Singh started shooting for her second film Mudh Mudh Ke Na Dekh Mudh Mudh Ke opposite Reshammiya which was shelved mid-way. She also acted in a Kannada film Private Number directed by Anand Kumar (director) that never found a release.

After a series of shelved and unreleased films, Singh made her debut with Ashim Ahluwalia's critically acclaimed first feature Miss Lovely, set in the criminal depths of Mumbai's C-grade sex-horror film industry. The film competed in Un Certain Regard at the 2012 Cannes Film Festival and won 2 awards at the 61st National Film Awards. Singh played a mysterious ingénue struggling to be an actress, for which she earned rave reviews for her performance and a nomination for the most promising newcomer at the 21st Screen Awards. During the media interactions for Miss Lovely, Niharika mentioned she is attempting to write a memoir.

Post her experience with Cannes and other international festivals, Niharika joined a course at the Film and Television Institute of India in 2013 to expand her understanding of the medium. The actress was selected for Berlinale Talents in 2016 where she was introduced to Alexander Technique while attending a workshop with Jean-Louis Rodrigue and Kristof Konrad.

Singh took a break from public life and made rare appearances in a few independently produced art house films over the next decade. She was seen in Buddhadeb Dasgupta's Hindi feature Anwar Ka Ajab Kissa that premiered at BFI London Film Festival, Bappaditya Bandopadhyay's multi-lingual drama Sohra Bridge, which screened at the 46th International Film Festival of India, Nikhil Pherwani's directorial debut Ahaan, the first Hindi-language film to cast an actor with down syndrome in the lead and Ashim Ahluwalia's Indian segment "Palace of horrors" in the feature-length horror anthology The Field Guide to Evil, which had its world premiere at South by Southwest.

She next appeared in Ameesha Joshi's short film Sonia Honey in 2026.

Niharika actively chose to keep a low profile in the media and rarely participated in promotional activities during this period.

=== Entrepreneurship and filmmaking (2019–present) ===
In 2019, Singh joined Mumbai-based Future East as a director of the film production company. She co-founded Future East Digital and turned producer with the young-adult drama Class for Netflix in 2023. The series explores a wide range of social issues affecting modern youth including casteism, child neglect, corruption, homophobia, religious discrimination, and income inequality in India.

She next produced Vishwendra Singh's immigrant drama Khoriya, a poignant exploration of the lives of Nepali workers in India, that made its world premiere at the 31st Busan International Film Festival.

== In media ==
Singh was given a rousing welcome and declared the state guest in Uttarakhand after she was crowned Miss Earth India. Additionally, she was appointed the goodwill ambassador for Rotary Blood Bank in 2005 at the behest of the Governor of Uttarakhand Sudarshan Agarwal and a garden was named after her in Mussoorie.

In 2007, a model from Benaras shot to fame by walking down the ramp impersonating Niharika Singh.

Niharika issued a public statement in 2017 when her name was used to garner publicity to sell actor Nawazuddin Siddiqui's memoir An Ordinary Life written by Rituparna Chatterjee and published by Penguin Random House with a fabricated account of their relationship. After a severe backlash and a defamation case by another actress Sunita Rajwar, Nawazuddin Siddiqui issued an apology and withdrew the book within a fortnight after its release. Veteran actress Asha Parekh showed her displeasure and said, "What Nawazuddin did to the ladies was not in good taste." In a later interview, Siddiqui stated that "It was the biggest mistake of my life."

In November 2018, Singh wrote an essay addressing the Me Too movement as a dalit woman in the entertainment business which was posted by journalist Sandhya Menon on Twitter. The piece went viral and was immediately picked up by all leading media publications and news channels in India. Niharika was subsequently invited as a guest and speaker for the India Conference at Harvard University in 2019 as well as Columbia University & The New School for the inaugural DALIFF held in New York.

== Pageantry ==
Year	Pageant	Organiser	Title won	Notes	Refs
2005	Femina Miss India	The Times Group	Miss Earth India	Also won subtitles for Miss Beautiful hair, Miss Photogenic	
2005	Miss Earth	Carousel Productions		Represented India	

== Filmography ==
=== Films ===
Year	Film	Role(s) / Credit	Language	Notes	Ref.
2012	Miss Lovely	Pinky/ Sonika/ Pooja	Hindi		
2013	A New Love Ishtory	Kamya Dhanraj	Hindi		
2013	Anwar Ka Ajab Kissa	Ayesha	Hindi		
2016	Sohra Bridge	Ria	English, Bengali, Assamese, Khasi		
2018	The Field Guide to Evil	Sadhavi	English, Bengali	Anthology; Segment – Palace of Horrors	
2019	Ahaan	Anu	Hindi		
2026	Sonia Honey	Radhika	Hindi, English	Short	
2026	Khoriya	Producer	Hindi, Nepali		

Key
†	Denotes films that have not yet been released

=== Television / Web Series ===
Year	Title	Credit	Platform	Notes
2006	Banungi Main Miss India	Host	Zoom (Indian TV channel)	12 episodes
2023	Class	Producer	Netflix	8 episodes

=== Music video appearances ===
Year	Song	Album	Singer	Label
2003	Gham Ka Khazana	Sajda	Lata Mangeshkar & Jagjit Singh	Saregama
2003	Dil aur Dhadkan	Dil aur Dhadkan	Babul Supriyo & Pamela Jain	Saregama
2005	Tere Liye	Kuchh Aisa Lagta Hai	Babul Supriyo	Universal

== Awards and nominations ==
Year	Award	Category	Film	Result	Refs
2015	Screen Awards	Most Promising Newcomer - Female	Miss Lovely	Nominated	
2015	IBNLive Movie Awards	Best Female Debut	Miss Lovely	Won	

Awards and achievements
Preceded by Jyoti Brahmin	Miss Earth India; 2005	Succeeded by Amruta Patki
