= Riwayat =

- Poster
- Directed by: Vijay Patkar
- Written by: Ajay Patole; Sanjay Patole
- Produced by: Sanjay Patole; Ajay Rane
- Starring: Khalid Siddiqui; Samapika Debnath; Saurabh Dubey; Salil Ankola
- Cinematography: Suresh Suvarna
- Edited by: Dinesh Mengade
- Music by: Sushil Lalji
- Production company: Horizon Films Pvt Ltd
- Release dates: May 8, 2010 (Monaco Charity Film Festival); September 7, 2012 (India)
- Running time: 122 minutes
- Country: India
- Language: Hindi

Riwayat (transl. Tradition) is a 2010 Indian drama film directed by Vijay Patkar and produced by Ajay Rane and Sanjay Patole. The film stars Khalid Siddiqui, Samapika Debnath, Saurabh Dubey and Salil Ankola in pivotal roles. The film is based on the issues of female foeticide in India. The film was screened at international film festivals and won several international awards.

== Cast ==
- Khalid Siddiqui as Raja Desai
- Samapika Debnath as Anita Desai
- Salil Ankola as Deepak Desai
- Saurabh Dubey as Seth Girdhar Desai (Raja and Deepak's father)
- Narendra Jha as Kabeer
- Aditya Lakhia as Gangaram
- Sayaji Shinde
- Bikramjeet Kanwarpal
- Achint Kaur
- Rajendra Gupta
- Gauri Kulkarni as Radha

== Critical reception ==
The film received mixed reviews. Srijana Das Mitra from The Times of India rated the film 2 out of 5, praised the acting and criticised that the film should have "highlighted the issue only". Shaheen Parker from Mid-Day rated 1.5 out of 5 criticised the film's story and direction.

== Accolades ==
The film was selected officially at many film festivals, including Monaco Charity International Film Festival, Cannes Film Festival, Cairo International Film Festival, Tallinn Black Nights Film Festival, CinefestOZ, and various film festivals in India. The film won five awards at different international film festivals.

Awards	Ceremony	Result	Ref(s)
Awards For Excellence	The Accolade Competition	Won	
Special Jury Award	Monaco Charity International Film Festival	Won	
Jury Prize (Cannes Film Festival)	Cannes Film Festival	Won	
Best Supporting Actress - Gauri Kulkarni	Maverick Movie Awards	Won	
Yellow Rose Award for Upcoming Film with World Premiere - Vijay Patkar	Jaipur International Film Festival	Won	
