= A New Love Ishtory =

- Directed by: John Matthew Matthan
- Screenplay by: John Matthew Matthan
- Produced by: Bhushan Kumar
- Starring: Himesh Reshammiya; Niharika Singh; Satish Shah; Rakesh Bapat; Rajkumar Rao
- Cinematography: Dhimant Vyas
- Music by: Himesh Reshammiya
- Distributed by: T-Series
- Running time: 125 minutes
- Country: India
- Language: Hindi

A New Love Ishtory is an unreleased Indian Hindi-language comedy drama film directed by John Matthew Matthan. The film stars Himesh Reshammiya, Niharika Singh, Satish Shah and Rakesh Bapat.

== Plot ==
Sikander Verma / Sukku is an unemployed stuntman that was once forced to sell his sperm for money. Now he's faced with the appearance of a daughter from that donation, who tracked him down after bribing a ward boy. Initially unwilling to get to know her, Sukku and his daughter begin to bond- much to the chagrin of her wealthy mother, who wants nothing to do with men. Sukku and his daughter must now find a way to convince her mother that they are indeed a family and that not all men are bad.

== Cast ==
- Himesh Reshammiya as Sikander Verma / Sukku Bhai
- Niharika Singh as Kamya Dhanraj
- Rakesh Bapat as Prince Vikram
- Parminder Ghumman
- Ripunjay Pathak
- Satish Shah as DD
- Mukul Pathak
- Rajkummar Rao as News Reporter

== Release ==
Bhushan Kumar first announced the film on 29 November 2007, with the intent of releasing A New Love Ishtory in 2008. In 2008 there were rumors that budget cuts would delay the film, which producer Bhushan Kumar denied. The film was later delayed, with Kumar stating that it would not release until Himesh Reshammiya's film Ishq Unplugged released. In 2012, director Matthan told Banglore Mirror, "My film was 95 per cent complete, but after John came up with Vicky Donor and trailed off. After the release of Vicky Donor, there was no point releasing another film based on the same subject." A pirated print of the film was released on YouTube.

== Soundtrack ==
A New Love Ishtory

Soundtrack album by Himesh Reshammiya
- Released: 2013
- Recorded: 2013
- Venue: Mumbai
- Genre: Feature film soundtrack
- Length: 5:23
- Language: Hindi
- Label: T-Series
- Producer: Himesh Reshammiya

Himesh Reshammiya chronology
Policegiri (2013)	A New Love Ishtory (2013)	The Xposé (2014)

Music and lyrics were composed and by Himesh Reshammiya.

Track listing
No.	Title	Lyrics	Singer(s)	Length
1.	"Bolo Sa Ra"	Sameer	Himesh Reshammiya	2:40
2.	"Jab Main Chhota Bachcha Tha"	Sameer	Himesh Reshammiya	1:53
3.	"Download Kar Gaye"	Himesh Reshammiya	Himesh Reshammiya	1:30
Total length:				5:23
