= Anwar Ka Ajab Kissa =

- Directed by: Buddhadev Dasgupta
- Written by: Buddhadev Dasgupta
- Produced by: Ajay Sharma
- Starring: Ananya Chatterjee; Nawazuddin Siddiqui; Pankaj Tripathi; Niharika Singh
- Cinematography: Diego Romero
- Edited by: Amitava Dasgupta
- Music by: Alokananda Dasgupta
- Distributed by: Eros International
- Release dates: 17 October 2013 (London); 20 November 2020
- Running time: 137 minutes
- Country: India
- Language: Hindi

Anwar Ka Ajab Kissa (English title: Sniffer) is 2013 Hindi dark comedy film directed by Buddhadev Dasgupta. The film about a detective in search of himself, stars Nawazuddin Siddiqui as the title role, followed by Ananya Chatterjee, Pankaj Tripathi and Niharika Singh in a guest appearance. After its premiere on 17 October 2013 at the BFI London Film Festival, the film was also screened at the 2013 International Film Festival of Kerala. The film was released on Eros Now on 20 November 2020.

== Plot ==
Anwar, a maverick detective works in a small detective agency, ‘Inner Eye’ in Kolkata. He gets himself into the personal lives of his cases, which gets him into troublesome and comic situations.

== Cast ==
- Nawazuddin Siddiqui as Mohammad Anwar
- Ananya Chatterjee as Malini (Amol's wife)
- Pankaj Tripathi as Amol
- Niharika Singh as Ayesha
- Amrita Chattopadhyay as Nafisa
- Makrand Brahme as Dayashankar Joshi (Boss of detective agency)
- Farrukh Jaffar
- Sohini Paul as Sudha
- Masood Akhtar as Khalil

== Production ==
National Film Award-winning director, Dasgupta returned to Hindi cinema after making Andhi Gali in 1984. He had finalized the story in 2011, but was waiting the right actor to essay role of a common man turned detective. Eventually after watching Nawazuddin Siddiqui's work in Kahaani (2012) and Gangs of Wasseypur (2012), he decided to cast him for the lead role.

Principal photography started at the hill village of Shimultala in Bihar, which depicted various places in West Bengal. In April 2013, parts of the film were being shot in the hill resort of Shimultala in Bihar, when due to a bandh call by Maoists, it was wrapped up in advance. Subsequently, the remaining shooting was completed in Kolkata. The Animal Welfare Board of India asked filmmakers for a special screening of the film as it featured a dog sharing screen with lead Nawazuddin.

== Reception ==
Saibal Chatterjee of NDTV gave the film 3.5 out of 5, writing that the melancholic tone of the movie is "leavened with nostalgia for the receding light; the pessimistic air is tempered with lingering hope of regeneration; the hard, meditative edge is softened by sustained humanism," further praising Nawazuddin Siddiqui, who Chatterjee says, redoubles the treat as "a private investigator who is more lost than the prodigals he is tasked to find...and is absolutely brilliant in this parable of pain and pining. The actor's captivating, acutely angular interpretation of a man who darts seamlessly back and forth between earnestness and resignation and Dasgupta's mastery over the medium make Anwar Ka Ajab Kissa a must watch." The Free Press Journal's Shubha Shetty (4/5 stars) felt that the script was "out of the ordinary as it offers a myriad of strange experiences even while narrating Anwar’s story...Most frames of the film (Diego Ramero) are rich with innumerable stories happening in the background and thus adding depth to the narration." "Filled with Buddhadeb Dasgupta’s trademark travelling and tracking shots, evocative locations and philosophical characters, the movie is sometimes lyrical, sometimes stagey, and at all times anchored by its leading man," said Nandini Ramnath in her review of the movie for the Scroll.in. Shubhra Gupta (2/5 stars), reviewing the movie for the Indian Express, wrote disappointedly, "The film looks like it has been yanked out of oblivion because Nawaz and Tripathi are now saleable names. There are only momentary patches in which you recognise Dasgupta’s distinctive signature, this medley of characters, and a mix of the real and the bizarre."
