= Kagojer Bou =

2011 film by Bappaditya Bandopadhyay

- Directed by: Bappaditya Bandopadhyay
- Based on: Kagojer Bou by Shirshendu Mukhopadhyay
- Release date: February 4, 2011
- Country: India
- Language: Bengali

Kagojer Bou (transl. Paper Wife) is a Bengali social drama film directed by Bappaditya Bandopadhyay based on a same name novel of Shirshendu Mukhopadhyay. This film was released on 4 February 2011.

== Plot ==
This is the story of love, lust, and betrayal in relationships and the analysis of characters in the modern society. Highly ambitious Upal meets Subimal, a wealthy businessman. Upal manages to get a young lady, Preety close to Subimal. Preety goes to a resort in Mondarmoni with Subimal and find Upal there. She understands the whole plot.

== Cast ==
- Rahul Banerjee as Upal
- Paoli Dam as Preety
- Bratya Basu as Manik Saha
- Rimjhim Gupta as Shreya
- Priyanka Sarkar as Ketaki
- Joy Sengupta as Subimal
- Dipak Mandal
- Nandini Ghosal
- Anindo Banerjee
- Nimai Ghosh
