= Amar Bodyguard =

- Directed by: Haranath Chakraborty
- Written by: Goutam Chakraborty
- Produced by: Ashok Hora; S. Kumar; Pinky Suchee Arts
- Starring: Ridhima Ghosh; Pratik Sen; Tapas Paul; Kanchan Mullick; Rajendra Prasad
- Cinematography: V. Prabhakar
- Edited by: Swapan Guha
- Music by: Samir Somu
- Release date: 29 March 2013 (Kolkata)
- Running time: 150 min
- Country: India
- Language: Bengali

Amar Bodyguard (or sometimes Aamar Bodyguard) is a 2013 Bengali film directed by Haranath Chakraborty and produced under the banner of Yoshi Films. The film stars Pratik Sen and Ridhima Ghosh in the lead role. The film was released on 29 March 2013, though the filming was completed by 2009. Ridhima and Pratik were supposed to be debutants in this film, but due to the delayed release, both of them appeared in numerous films in between.

== Plot ==
Anol (Pratik Sen) is a philanthropist who spends his time doing good deeds and helping out people. One day he comes across Ankhi (Ridhima Ghosh), a spoilt urchin who thinks a lot about money. Anol and Ankhi become inseparable and they always go together to all places. It seems as if Ankhi loves Anol, but actually, she doesn't. On the other hand, Anol falls in love with her and one day, confesses his love for her. But, Ankhi ridicules him and lets him know that she was just playing a game with him and that he was just like her bodyguard, whom she took everywhere for her own safety. However, Anol's love changes Ankhi's mindset. In the meantime, Ankhi's fiancé, Jayanta (Kanchan Mullick) tries to kill Anol by employing goons and Anol is arrested on false charges. Afterwards, the charges were reversed when it was revealed that Jayanta was the culprit. The film ends as Jayanta is arrested and Ankhi goes back to Anol. Ankhi is helped by Anol to overcome her mistakes.

== Cast ==
- Pratik Sen as Anol
- Tapas Paul as Police officer
- Kanchan Mullick as Jayanta
- Riddhima Ghosh as Ankhi
- Sumit Ganguly as Sub inspector
- Goutam Chakraborty as Dance choreographer
- Anjan Mahato as Police constable
