= Kaal (2007 film) =

- DVD cover of kaal
- Directed by: Bappaditya Bandopadhyay
- Written by: Shakti Barthwal
- Produced by: Srishti Productions
- Starring: Chandrayee Ghosh; Rudranil Ghosh
- Cinematography: Rana Dasgupta
- Music by: Abhijit Bose
- Release date: 6 January 2007
- Running time: 118 minutes
- Country: India
- Language: Bengali

Kaal ( Bengali: কাল, transl. Our Time) is a Bengali film released on 6 January 2007. The film directed by Bappaditya Bandopadhyay stars Chandrayee Ghosh, and Rudranil Ghosh in lead roles.

It was selected for screening at the Cairo International Film Festival, 2007, the São Paulo International Film Festival 2007 and the Stockholm International Film Festival 2007. Incidentally, this is the third successive year that Bandopadhyay's film is being screened at São Paulo International Film Festival. The film was already successfully screened at the Osian's Cinefan Festival of Asian and Arab Cinema, 2007, where it was one of the Indian films competing in the festival.

== Plot ==
KAAL is about prostitution and call-girl services of Kolkata. The girls move from a rural area into a large city after being lured and offered lucrative money by the recruiter Ratan. They ultimately become call-girls for the sake of survival. Ranidi grooms the depressed and oppressed girls and gives them a complete make over in a short time. The movie depicts the corruption associated with their entire business. The girls reasonably and rightfully accept the fact that money is better than sunshine and sweeter than honey because of poverty. They forget their miserable past. They get caught up in making more money and buying more fun. They understand that surviving in this treacherous world is not possible through love, honesty and humanity. Hence they let themselves drain away in the world of consuming and consumption. The girls are shown traveling to the top hotels in Kolkata. The middleman Ratan is shown trying to go to Singapore. The village police inspector and the other partners in the game(Indian Border Security Force) continue to operate.

== Director’s note ==
"In a way, this film is a sequel to my earlier film Kantatar (Barbed Wire). The partition, at one point of time, caused human displacement in a large scale in our country. The present trend of globalization has once again unleashed a massive displacement of human beings. The backdrop is also even more complex. It was therefore impossible to maintain a linear narration. Kaal is a multilayered film dealing with human displacement."

== Cast ==
- Rudranil Ghosh as Ratan
- Chandrayee Ghosh
- Partha Sarathi Deb
- Dola Chakraborty
- Sandhya Shetty as Ranidi
- Sankar Debnath
- Samapika Debnath
- Rupsha Guha
- Nemai Ghosh
- Iqbal Sultan
- Mishar Ray

== Censorship ==
Bappaditya Bandopadhyay is in trouble with the regional Censor Board for some scenes in Kaal being 'too graphic'. The scene is about the rape of an illegal migrant girl from Bangladesh by personnel of the Border Security Force. The director says that his film is on human trafficking and is based on NGO reports. He is now waiting for the revision committee to see his film. "The problem is that any criticism against any authority is met with iron clamps. The basic principles of democracy are being violated and the right to self-expression is either denied completely, or censored conveniently," says Bappaditya.
