= Thai Curry (film) =

2019 Indian Bengali comedy drama film

- Theatrical release poster
- Directed by: Ankit Aditya
- Screenplay by: Padmanabha Dasgupta
- Story by: Sarthak Juneja; Ankit Aditya
- Dialogues by: Padmanava Dasgupta
- Produced by: Shyam Sundar Dey; Anirban Aditya
- Cinematography: Gopi Bhagat
- Edited by: MD Kalam
- Music by: Amlaan Chakraborty
- Production companies: Greentouch Entertainment; Aditya Productions
- Release date: 1 March 2019
- Running time: 127 minutes
- Country: India
- Language: Bengali

Thai Curry is a 2019 Indian Bengali comedy drama film directed by debutant Ankit Aditya. Written by Aditya along with Sarthak Juneja, it has been produced Shyam Sundar Dey and Anirban Aditya under the banners of Greentouch Entertainment and Aditya Productions. The film stars Soham Chakraborty, Rudranil Ghosh and Hiran Chatterjee in the lead roles.

Principal photography took place in Thailand, with majority of the scenes being filmed in Bangkok and Pattaya City. This movie marked the feature film debut of television actress Trina Saha. Amlaan Chakraborty composed the music of the film. Gopi Bhagat did the cinematography while MD Kalam handled the editing. The film was released in the theatres on 1 March 2023.

== Synopsis ==
Three friends, Samya, Ayan and Nitin — their trip to Thailand leads them into trouble with a drug dealer and a mafia group. Samya's fiancee and her family also arrive in Thailand for their engagement, adding to the complications. The story follows the friends as they try to get out of trouble while dealing with their relationships and the events surrounding the engagement.

== Cast ==
- Soham Chakraborty as Ayan, a chef
- Rudranil Ghosh as Nitin
- Hiran Chatterjee as Samya, a real estate worker
- Trina Saha as Tamalika, Ayan's fiancee
- Pallavi Chatterjee as Naina, Tamalika's Mother
- Abhijit Guha as Tamalika's father
- Bidya Sinha Saha Mim as Maya, Tamalika's friend
- Saswata Chatterjee as Marco Dutta, a drug-dealer
- Apratim Chatterjee as Alphie
- Amrit Dujari as Brocco
- Sayan Ghosh as Beno
- Ayoshi Talukdar
- Rachel White as Naira

== Reception ==
=== Critical reception ===
Roushni Sarkar of Cinestaan reviewed the film and noted "Thai Curry has a compact storyline and is less absurd and regressive than other mainstream comedies of its kind. But it is not meant to provoke deep thought about its cinematic value or its content." She appreciated Rudranil and Saswata's comedic performances, few witty dialogues, slapstick humour, the presence of a subtle emotional angle, the music, the cinematography, the action sequences and the storyline but bemoaned the unnecessary obsession of Tamalika's parents with Tagore, Hiran's weak dialogue delivery and numerous lame dialogues spoken by Saswata's character.

Shamayita Chakraborty of The Times of India rated the film and wrote "Overall, Thai Curry is a wannabe comedy without tad smartness. Just innuendo- heavy punch lines cannot salvage a two-hour long film." She appreciated the casting, the filming locations, the cinematography, the funny punch lines, Rudranil and Saswata's comic performances, the title track and Trina's debut performance but criticized the weak script, aimless storyline and the unnecessary usage of songs.
