= Ho Sakta Hai =

- Poster of the film
- Directed by: Wilson Louis
- Written by: Wilson Louis
- Screenplay by: Wilson Louis
- Produced by: Ashok Kotwani
- Starring: Khalid Siddiqui; Hazel Crowney; Victor Banerjee
- Cinematography: Suresh Suvarna
- Music by: Rahul Ranade
- Production company: Venus Records & Tapes
- Release dates: 2005 (Cannes Film Festival); 31 March 2006 (India)
- Country: India
- Language: Hindi
- Box office: ₹88,982 (equivalent to ₹290,000 or US$3,000 in 2023) (total)

Ho Sakta Hai (English: It Could Happen) is a 2006 Indian horror film directed by Wilson Louis and produced by Ashok Kotwani. The film stars Khalid Siddiqui, Hazel Crowney, and Victor Banerjee. It follows a family living peacefully until they discover that they are falling prey to black magic.

The film was screened at several international film festivals but was a box office bomb in India.

== Cast ==
- Khalid Siddiqui as Dr. Mohan
- Hazel Crowney as Claire
- Victor Banerjee as Mohan's grandfather
- Mukesh Tiwari as Kushaba (face reader)
- Neena Kulkarni as Shakuntala
- Jaya Bhattacharya as Snehal
- Pinky Campbell as Parvati (credited as Mohini)
- Master Dharmik as Tanya (Mohan's son)

== Critical reviews ==
Taran Adarsh of Bollywood Hungama rated the film 1.5 out of 5, praising the performances of Victor Banerjee, Khalid Siddiqui, and Hazel Crowney.

Joginder Tuteja of IndiaGlitz praised the visual effects of the film.

Parbina Rashid of The Tribune highlighted the performances of Banerjee and Mohini (Campbell).

== Accolades ==
Ho Sakta Hai was screened at the Cannes Film Festival in 2005 and the Filmpur Film Festival in England the same year. The film was nominated as one of the Best Three Films at the FICCI Awards. It also won a Seagate Technical Award for Best Visual Effects.

Year	Award	Ceremony	Result	Notes(s) / Ref(s)
2006	Best Visual Effects	Seagate Technical Awards	Won	
2006	Official Selection	Academy of Motion Picture Arts and Sciences library	Selected	
2006	Best Visual Effects	FICCI Awards	Nominated	
