= The Field Guide to Evil =

The Field Guide To Evil
- Theatrical release poster
- Directed by: Ashim Ahluwalia; Can Evrenol; Severin Fiala; Veronika Franz; Katrin Gebbe; Calvin Reeder; Agnieszka Smoczynska; Peter Strickland; Yannis Veslemes
- Written by: Roberto Bolseto; Elif Domanic; Can Evrenol; Severin Fiala; Veronika Franz; Katrin Gebbe; Calvin Reeder; Peter Strickland; Yannis Veslemes; Silvia Wolkan
- Produced by: Robert Dehn; Can Everenol; Nia Kingsley; Christos V. Konstantakopoulos; Tim League; Carl W. Lucas; Dora Nedeczky; Andrew Starke; Ant Timpson; Esther Turan
- Starring: Birgit Minichmayr; Claude Duhamel; Jilon VanOver; Fatma Mohamed; Niharika Singh
- Cinematography: Tyler Lee Cushing; Martin Gschlacht; Márk Györi; Hristos Karamanis; Kuba Kijowski; Meryem Yavuz
- Edited by: Christoph Brunner; Matyas Fekete; Jarosław Kamiński; Yorgos Mavropsaridis; Buzz Pierce
- Music by: Jeremy Barnes; Nicholas Brawley; Karl Steven; Yannis Veslemes; Stefan Will
- Production companies: Legion M EchoWolf Productions; Aurum
- Release date: 11 March 2018 (U.S.)
- Running time: 117 mins
- Languages: Austrian German, Bengali, English, German, Greek, Polish, Turkish

The Field Guide To Evil is a 2018 anthology horror film produced by Legion M. Eight film makers from different countries bring stories or folk tales from their country to the anthology.

== Plot ==
The film comprises treatises on forbidden love, Greek underworld goblins, medieval Hungarian cobblers and US hillbilly folklore.

The stories and filmmakers come from:

- Austria: "The Sinful Women of Hollfall", directed by Veronika Franz and Severin Fiala
- Turkey: "Haunted by Al Karisi: The Childbirth Djinn", directed by Can Evrenol
- Poland: "The Kindler and the Virgin", directed by Agnieszka Smoczynska
- United States: "Beware of The Melonheads", directed by Calvin Reeder
- Greece: "Whatever Happened to Panagas the Pagan", directed by Yannis Veslemes
- India: "The Palace of Horrors", directed by Ashim Ahluwalia
- Germany: "A Nocturnal Breath", directed by Katrin Gebbe
- Hungary: "Cobbler’s Lot", directed by Peter Strickland

== Cast ==
- Birgit Minichmayr as Mutter
- Claude Duhamel as Loni
- Jilon VanOver as Chris
- Fatma Mohamed as Boglarka
- Niharika Singh as Sadhvi

== Reception ==
The critical reception has been mostly positive, receiving a 70% rating on Rotten Tomatoes. Opening at the SXSW Festival, the film was nominated for the SXSW Gamechanger Award.
