= Khalid Siddiqui =

Indian actor & model

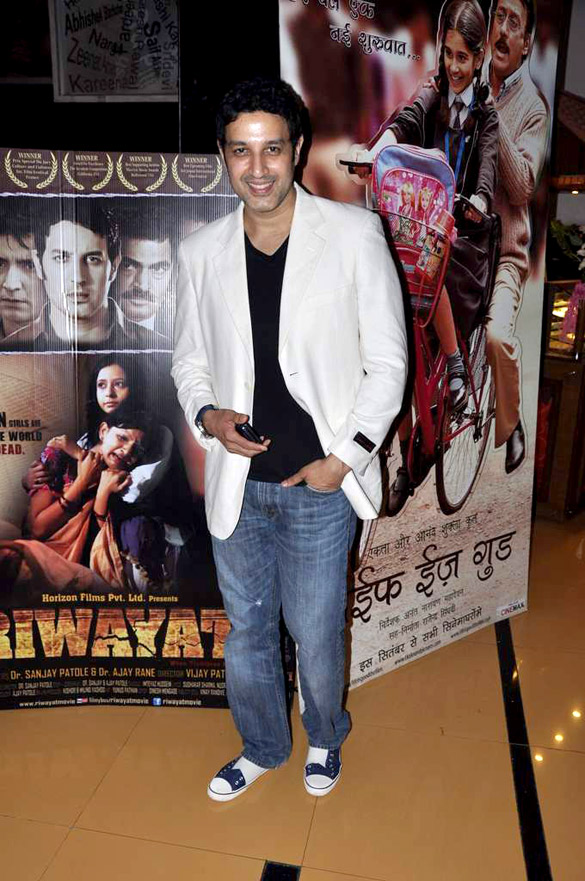
- Siddiqui at premiere of Riwayat
- Born: 1 February 1971 (age 55); Bombay, Maharashtra, India
- Occupations: Model; Actor
- Years active: 1993–Present
- Notable work: Ghajini
- Spouse: Raahat Siddiqui (sep. 2013) (div. 2015)
- Children: 2

Khalid Siddiqui (born 1 February 1971) is an Indian model and actor. Siddiqui has worked in a number of television shows and films. He played a supporting role in Ghajini.

== Career ==
Before entering in the industry, Siddiqui had worked in a number of television commercials for brands including ICICI Bank, Bombay Dyeing, Cadbury Perk, Suzuki Alto and Gillette. Siddiqui made his debut in a music video which was directed by Subhash Ghai. His screen appearance in the video gained him a parallel lead role in the film Joggers' Park (2003). Actor Victor Banerjee was impressed by his acting skills and offered him to play lead role in the film Ho Sakta Hai (2006), directed by Wilson Louis. (Note: The film "Ho Sakta Hai" was originally released in 2006, whereas "The Film" which was released in 2005 became his first film as a lead character.) Critic Taran Adarsh praised Siddiqui's performance in the film.

In 2007 he participated in the song "Mujhe Khabar Thi" from Lata Mangeshkar's music album Saadgi(2007) opposite Mona Singh, launched by T-Series.

Siddiqui also appeared in the films Apaharan (2005), The Film (2005), Ghajini (2008), Riwayat (2012), One Night Stand (2016), Sargoshiyan (2017) and Lahore Confidential (2021).

Siddiqui moved from films to television with the show Main Aisi Kyunn Hoon (2007). Further, he played Manav in the soap opera Na Bole Tum Na Maine Kuch Kaha (2012), where his character had a commercial angle between Megha (Aakanksha Singh) and Mohan (Kunal Karan Kapoor). In the same year, he played the roles of Tauseef Baig in the drama Tum Saath Ho Jab Apne (2014) where his character, being dead is seen in flashbacks, a superhero and his alter-ego journalist in Maharakshak: Aryan (2014) and as a mythological king in The Adventures of Hatim (2013). he has also played a role of Chief Minister in Ek Shringaar-Swabhiman. Khalid also appeared in Star Plus's most popular drama series Saath Nibhaana Saathiya as a protagonist, opposite Devoleena Bhattacharjee after the walk-out of the lead actor Mohammad Nazim, who was playing Ahem.

== Personal life ==
Siddiqui was born and brought up in Mumbai Maharashtra. He was married to Raahat with whom he had a daughter, Ariana, born on 19 November 2003 and a son, Ilhaan, born on 1 September 2010. In 2013 the couple separated and in 2015 the couple were divorced.

== Filmography ==
=== Films ===
Key
†	Denotes films that have not yet been released

Year	Title	Role	Note(s)	Ref(s)
2003	Joggers' Park (film)	Ranjeet Singh		
2005	The Film	Vijay		
2005	Apaharan	Kamal Kishore		
2006	Ho Sakta Hai	Mohan		
2007	Dhol	Gopi - Pankaj's friend		
2008	Ghajini	Manager - Air Voice		
2012	Riwayat	Raja Desai		
2016	One Night Stand	Adhiraj Kapoor		
2017	Sargoshiyan	Bank Manager		
2021	Lahore Confidential	RD		ZEE5
2024	Bade Miyan Chote Miyan	Ambassador		
2026	Batwara 1947	Ratan		
2026	Suryaa			

=== Television ===
Year	Serial	Role	Channel	Notes & References
2007–2008	Main Aisi Kyunn Hoon	Siddharth	Sahara One	Lead role
2008	Zindagi Badal Sakta Hai Hadsaa	Inspector Ekaansh Thakur	Zee TV	Lead role
2011	Dhoondh Legi Manzil Humein	Jayvardhan	Star One	Supporting role
2012	Na Bole Tum Na Maine Kuch Kaha	Manav Chaturvedi	Colors TV	Negative role
2013; 2014	The Adventures of Hatim	King Naushwerwaan of Ashkaar	Life OK	Cameo appearance
2014	Maharakshak: Aryan	Arjun Sharma	Zee TV	Cameo appearance
2014	Tum Saath Ho Jab Apne	Tauseef Baig	Sony Pal	Cameo appearance
2015–2016	Dream Girl – Ek Ladki Deewani Si	Manav Sareen	Life OK	Supporting role
2016	Saath Nibhana Saathiya	Dr. Krishna Raheja	Star Plus	Supporting role
2017	Ek Shringaar – Swabhiman	Chief Minister	Colors TV	Supporting role
2017	Love Ka Hai Intezaar	Suyyash Thakur	Star Plus	Negative role
2017–2018	Piyaa Albela	Aashish Kapoor	Zee TV	Negative role
2017–2018	Rishta Likhenge Hum Naya	Maan Singh	Sony Entertainment Television	Cameo appearance
2018–2019	Mariam Khan – Reporting Live	Majaaz Khan	Star Plus	Supporting role
2020	Dadi Amma... Dadi Amma Maan Jaao!	Sundarlal Jhavar	Star Plus	Supporting role
2020–2021	Shaurya Aur Anokhi Ki Kahani	Shaan Sabharwal	Star Plus	Supporting role
2021–2022	Kashibai Bajirao Ballal	Chhatrapati Shahu I Bhonsle	Zee TV	Supporting role
2026	Mr. and Mrs. Parshuram	Karan Kulkarni	StarPlus	Negative role

=== Web series ===
Year	Show	Role	Channel	Notes
2021	Bisaat	Yash Kapoor	MX Player	
2021	The Empire	Umar Shaikh	Hotstar	
2019	REJCTX	Prithviraj Sharma	ZEE5	
2024	Dil Dosti Dilemma	Khalid	Prime Video	
2026	Sangamarmar		JioHotstar	
