= Junaid Memon =

Indian filmmaker (born 1975)

Junaid Memon (Zunaid Memon)
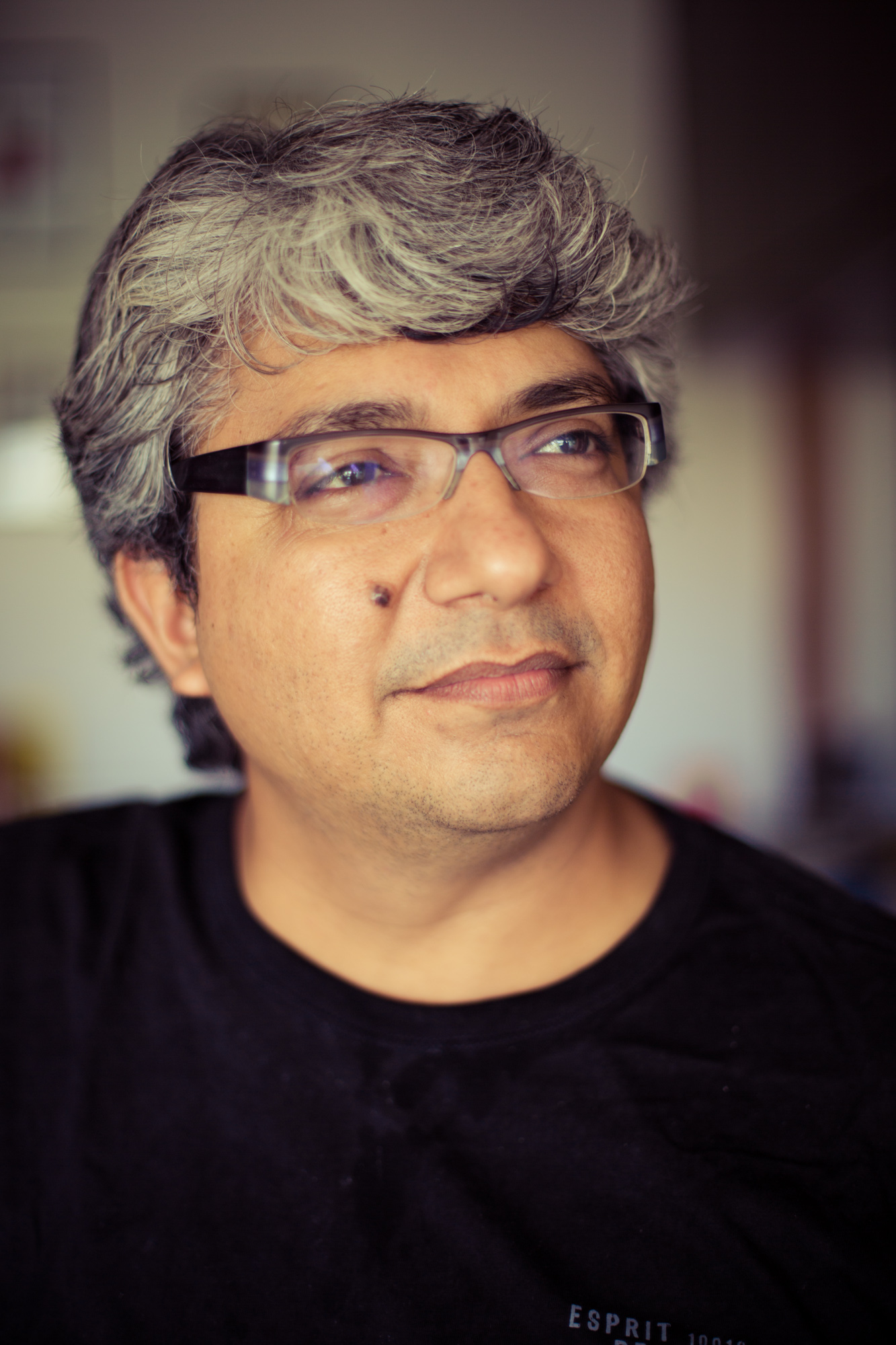
- Born: Zunaid Memon; 2 February; Bemetara
- Occupations: Owner at Green TV; Founder of ARDEA Foundation; Co-Founder of Nomad Films Limited
- Years active: 1994 – present

Junaid Memon (also spelled Zunaid Memon) is an Indian film producer and director. He is the founder of Nomad Films Ltd., which produces feature films, commercials, and documentaries. He founded the non-profits ARDEA Foundation and Green TV India, to promote sustainable agriculture among Indian farmers.

== Career ==
In 1997, Memon founded Nomad Films Ltd., a Mumbai-based production company. He worked on producing, scripting, and directing several projects, including the feature film The Film (2005) and Marathi productions like "Anolkhi Hey Ghar Maze" (2009) and "Upside Down (2012).

In 2013 he founded the ARDEA Foundation, a nonprofit organization.

In 2014 he established Green TV India, a private agricultural and rural knowledge bank. The group works to disseminate agricultural information to benefit rural communities.

== Filmography ==
=== Films ===
Year	Title	Notes
1999	Last Train to Mahakali	Exct. Producer
2003	Waisa Bhi Hota Hai Part II	Original Script
2005	The Film	Producer / Director / Writer
2006	Khosla Ka Ghosla	Exct. Producer
2008	Mumbai Cutting	Co-Producer
2008	Naan Aval Adhu	Co-Producer
2009	Anolkhi Hey Ghar Maze	Producer
2012	Upside Down (Khalti Doka Varti Paay)	Producer
2013	Yaar Mera Rab Warga	Producer
2024	Joram	Film Finance & Production Counsel

=== Television ===
Year	Title1	Notes
1999-2000	Star Bestsellers	Production Manager / Actor
