= Sohra Bridge =

- Directed by: Bappaditya Bandopadhyay
- Produced by: Mithu Dey
- Starring: Barun Chanda; Niharika Singh; Pratik Sen; Nishita Goswami; Paul Phukan; Merlvin Jude Mukhim; Sankar Dey
- Cinematography: Rana Dasgupta
- Edited by: Dipak Mandal
- Music by: Gaurab Chatterjee
- Distributed by: Homemade Films
- Release date: 26 February 2016
- Running time: 104 minutes
- Country: India
- Languages: Bengali, Assamese and Khasi

Sohra Bridge is a multilingual Indian drama film directed by late Bappaditya Bandopadhyay starring Niharika Singh and Barun Chanda in primary roles. Memories, imagination and reality come together in the journey of a young girl looking for her estranged father. The unexplored, beautiful and politically volatile North East of India provides the backdrop.

This was Bappaditya's last film and was released posthumously in February 2016. The dialogue of the film is in English, Bengali, Assamese and Khasi.

== Plot ==
Sohra Bridge tells the story of a daughter who embarks on a journey across the remote expanses of North-East India, looking for her father. She finds herself drawn towards a complex labyrinth of memory and imagination. The film conjures up a magical reality where real gives way to the surreal, bloodshed to poetry, memory to the imaginary and vice versa.

== Cast ==
- Barun Chanda as Ria's father
- Niharika Singh as Ria
- Nishita Goswami
- Pratik Sen as Asish
- Moumita Mitra
- Paul Phukan
- Merlvin J Mukhim
- Raj Banerjee
