= Detective (2020 film) =

2020 Bengali drama film

- Film poster
- Directed by: Joydip Mukherjee
- Screenplay by: Joydip Mukherjee
- Story by: Rabindranath Tagore
- Starring: Anirban Bhattacharya; Ishaa Saha; Saheb Bhattacharya; Trina Saha; Ambarish Bhattacharya
- Music by: Joy Sarkar
- Production company: Shree Venkatesh Films
- Distributed by: Hoichoi
- Release date: 14 August 2020
- Running time: 115 minutes
- Country: India
- Language: Bengali

Detective is an Indian Bengali thriller-drama film directed by Joydip Mukherjee and produced by Shree Venkatesh Films. The film features Anirban Bhattacharya, and Ishaa Saha in lead roles with Saheb Bhattacharya, Trina Saha, and Ambarish Bhattacharya in the supporting roles. The film is based on eponymous short story of Rabindranath Tagore. The film was released on 14 August 2020 on Bengali OTT platform Hoichoi. It is the first Bengali film released on OTT platform directly.

== Plot ==
The film is a Bengali thriller comedy based on Tagore's story of the same name. Set during the time of the British Raj, the backdrop for the story is the partition of Bengal in 1905. The film revolves around Mahimchandra, a detective with the Bengal police. His obsession with western detective novels and crimes makes him think that his job is too boring. Mahimchandra searches for the perfect crime with a complex motive that will make his profession somewhat exciting. Filled with hilarious dialogues and comic deductions of Mahimchandra, the film progresses with the growing political turmoil of the Swadeshi movement. As Mahimchandra continues his search for the perfect criminal, his obsession starts to affect his career and personal life.

== Cast ==
- Anirban Bhattacharya as Mahimchandra
- Ishaa Saha as Shudhamukhi
- Saheb Bhattacharya as Manmothanath
- Trina Saha as Snehalata
- Ambarish Bhattacharya as Hutashon/Watson
- Shreetoma Bhattacharya as Harimati

== Soundtrack ==
Track listing
| No. | Title | Singer(s) | Length |
|---|---|---|---|
| 1. | "Khelaghor Bandhte Legechi" | Madhuraa Bhattacharya | 3:01 |
