= Deepak Tiwari =

Indian Journalist

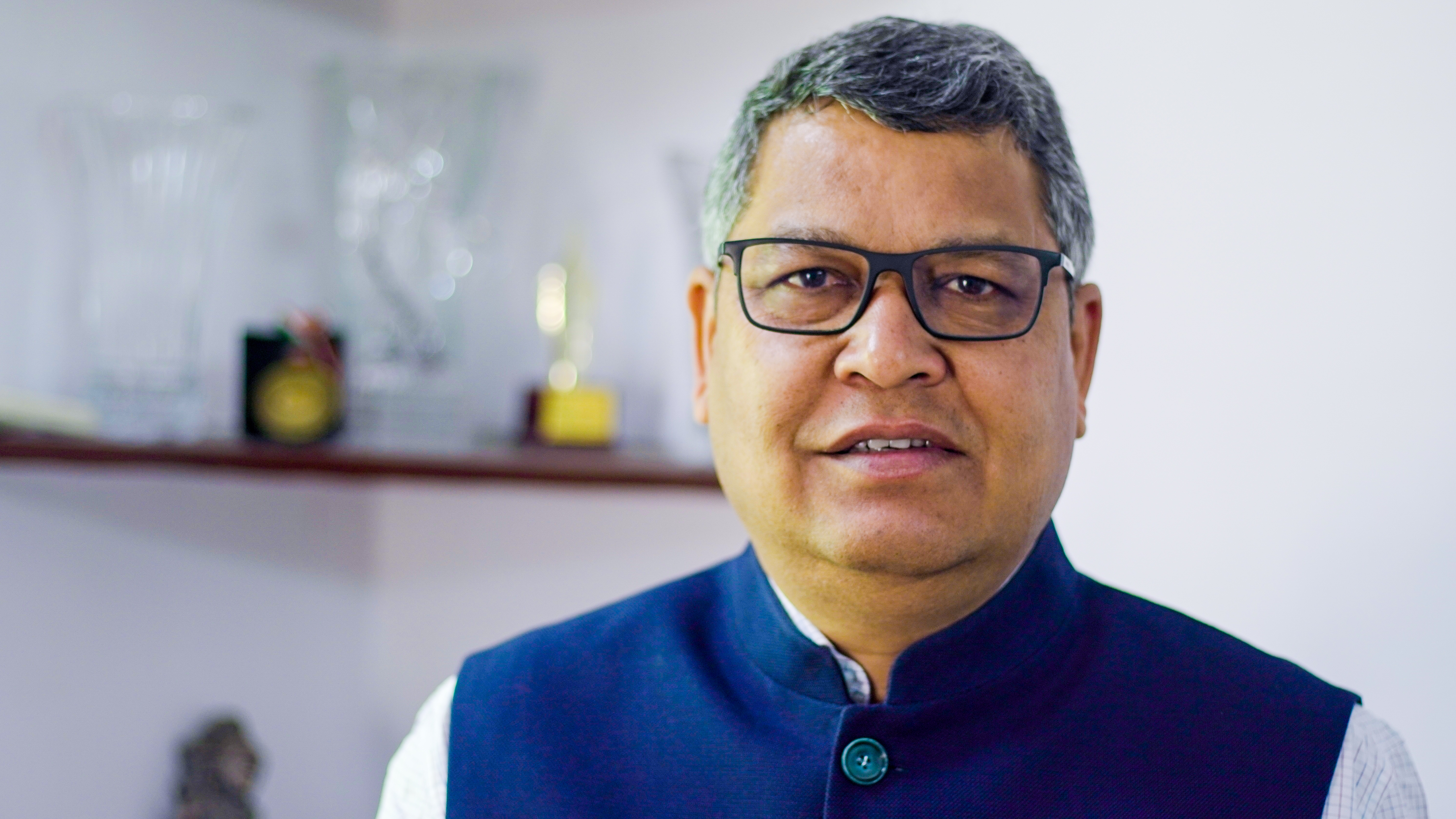

Deepak Tiwari is an Indian journalist, serving as the Hindi editor of Global Investigative Journalism Network (GIJN) and former Vice Chancellor of Makhanalal Chaturvedi National University of Journalism in Bhopal, Madhya Pradesh. He was founder managing editor of JoshHosh Media.

== Life ==
In the field of journalism since 1991, Tiwari had worked for The Week magazine, Press Trust of India PTI, New Delhi, Free Press, Central Chronicle and All India Radio. His longest stint was in The Week for 21 years. As a journalist he has reported news-stories from the states of Madhya Pradesh, Chhattisgarh, Uttar Pradesh, Jharkhand, Orissa, Assam, Mizoram, Rajasthan, Andhra Pradesh, Gujarat, and Maharashtra. He has also covered stories from United Kingdom, Malaysia, Singapore and Thailand outside India.

His story on the abuse of dalit women in Panchayati Raj fetched him the Sarojini Naidu Prize for best reporting on women in Panchayati Raj. The award carries a cash prize of ₹200,000 and is given every year to development journalists. Another story in 2002 on missing tribal girls from central India got him United Nation Development Program (UNDP) award. Tiwari is also a recipient of Makhanlal Chaturvedi Puruskar, Jagat Pathak Patrakarita Puruskar, Prashant Samman and other awards.

With The Week magazine he had written number of investigative stories on human rights and development issues. He is known as a progressive journalist writing on marginalised sections of society. A feature film Devaki, made in 2004, was based on his story of women being auctioned in tribal society.

Apart from being a political commentator on various media forums including television, Tiwari had worked as media consultant to projects of European Commission, DFID of United Kingdom and UNICEF.

His book on political history of Madhya Pradesh titled Rajneetinama Madhya Pradesh Rajnetaon Ke Kisse (1956-2003) published in December 2013 was termed as the seminal work on political history of Madhya Pradesh by The Hindu. His second book is Rajnitinama Madhya Pradesh - Bhajapa Yug (2003-2018).

As a journalist he has travelled to thirty countries of the world.
