= Devaki (2005 film) =

- DVD cover
- Directed by: Bappaditya Bandopadhyay
- Written by: Shakti Barthwal
- Produced by: K.D. Singh
- Starring: Ram Kapoor; Suman Ranganathan
- Cinematography: Rana Dasgupta
- Edited by: Rajeev Jhaveri; Uttam Roy; Shakeel
- Music by: Bikram Ghosh; Amar Haldipur; Sameer Phaterpekar
- Distributed by: Shristri Prods
- Release dates: September 2005 (Temecula Valley International Film Festival); 6 January 2006 (India)
- Running time: 87 minutes
- Country: India
- Language: Hindi

Devaki is a Hindi film released on 6 January 2006. The film directed by Bappaditya Bandopadhyay stars Ram Kapoor, Suman Ranganathan, Arvin Tucker, and Perizaad Zorabian. The film premiered at the Osian Cinefan Asian Film Festival in July 2005. Since then, it has traveled to 11 international film festivals amidst much critical accolades and has been touted as a 'must watch for every woman'. Nominated for the best feature film at São Paulo International Film Festival, Brazil, Asheville International Film Festival, North Carolina, Global Knight International Film Festival, Malta, and Golden Gate International Film Festival, San Francisco, it won the award in Asheville. Officially released on 6 January 2006, this small film has been doing the rounds in the video stores for some time.

The plot is derived from a real-life incident where a tribal woman named Devakibai was sold in an open auction in Pandhana, a sub-division of Khandwa district in Madhya Pradesh, in January 2003. The auction was organized by the Maha Panchayat Panchaganga and legitimized by the presence of Hiralal Silawat, Minister of Fisheries, who inaugurated the function. This atrocity was uncovered by journalist Deepak Tiwari and became the cover story of the magazine, The Week.

== Plot ==
Devaki takes a look at the parallel lives of two young women, belonging to strikingly different backgrounds, who were both betrayed by their fathers and lovers.

Devaki (Suman Ranganathan) is a village girl who is forced into marriage to a 70-year-old man. On the night of the marriage, she is raped by the brother of the impotent old man in order to establish the age-old practice of physical dominance of the male over the female. She develops a relationship with a low-caste runaway boy, but the villagers catch them in the love-making, and they are brought before the Panchayat. Devaki is made to stand holding a heavy stone on her head, the severity of the punishment aimed at setting an example to other women. The villagers and the Panchayat decide to auction Devaki to the highest bidder and pay the money to the 70-year-old husband. Once again, another old man buys her.

The life of Nandini (Perizaad Zorabian) is more complicated. In protest against the feudal practices in Devaki's village, Nandini, an urban girl who has come to the village to work as an NGO activist trying to empower the village women through literacy and awareness, quits her job and goes back to the city. Soon, she finds out that, in some respects, urban life is no different from village life. Economically betrayed and physically used by her lover Rahul (Ram Kapoor), she feels herself losing self-respect and betrayed and disillusioned by Rahul's treatment of his pregnant wife, Sumana, and the lies he has been telling both women. She forces herself to end the illicit relationship and joins an advertising agency. But she is shocked to find out that her selfish father (George Baker), who had deserted the family many years ago, owns the agency. He doesn't seem to remember that he left behind a wife who is now in a mental asylum, still awaiting his return, and a daughter whom he doesn't recognize, though she works for him. The ultimate betrayal comes when her father-boss advises her to satisfy his client sexually to clinch a deal and offers her 2% of the profit as a reward. She decides to sell herself to this lecherous old man, avenging her father's betrayal by sacrificing herself. Her vindication comes in the form of his shock when she eventually tells him the truth.

== Cast ==
- Ram Kapoor...Rahul
- Suman Ranganathan....Devaki
- Arvin Tucker ...
- Perizaad Zorabian...Nandini
- Neelanjan Bose....
- George Baker.... Father of Nandini
- Raman Kapoor...

== Release ==
- United States -September 2005(Temecula Valley International Film Festival)
- Brazil-23 September 2005 (Festival do Rio BR)
- India- 6 January 2006
- Singapore-16 April 2006

== Awards ==
- Best Feature Film Award at the Asheville Film Festival-North Carolina-U.S.

== Music ==
1. Dhuan Dhuan Hain Dhuan – Jojo
2. Dil Naiyyo Naiyyo – Jojo
3. Toree Bahiya Mai – Jojo
