= Khorkuto =

Indian Bengali television series

- Genre: Drama; Family; Comedy; Romance
- Written by: Leena Gangopadhyay
- Directed by: Saibal Banerjee; Snehasish Jana, Sudip Santra
- Creative director: Leena Gangopadhyay
- Starring: Trina Saha Bhattacharya; Koushik Roy
- Opening theme: Khorkuto by Anweshaa
- Composer: Debojyoti Mishra
- Country of origin: India
- Original language: Bengali
- No. of episodes: 715

Production
- Executive producers: Debolina Mukhopadhyay; Sumit Roy (Magic Moments Motion Pictures); Taniya; Supriyo (Star Jalsha)
- Producer: Saibal Banerjee
- Production location: Kolkata
- Cinematography: Madhab Naskar
- Editors: Samir; Soumen
- Camera setup: Multi-camera
- Running time: 22 minutes
- Production company: Magic Moments Motion Pictures

Original release
- Network: Star Jalsha
- Release: 17 August 2020 – 21 August 2022

Khorkuto is a 2020 Indian Bengali-language romantic comedy drama television series that premiered on 17 August 2020 and aired on Bengali General Entertainment Channel Star Jalsha and is also available on the digital platform Disney+ Hotstar. The show was produced by Magic Moments Motion Pictures of Saibal Banerjee and Leena Gangopadhyay and starred Trina Saha Bhattacharya and Koushik Roy. The show's plotline and characters seem to have been heavily inspired from a previous show produced by Magic Moments Motion Pictures, Kojagori.

== Plot ==
Khorkuto is a heartwarming tale of love, family, and self-discovery. The story revolves around Gungun, a beautiful and sophisticated upper-class girl, who falls in love with Soujanyo, a middle-class scholar. Despite their different backgrounds, they get married, but with a condition: they will divorce after a year, once Gungun completes and passes her exams.

As Gungun becomes a part of Soujanyo's joint family, she wins their hearts with her kindness and generosity, despite her rough edges. However, their happiness is short-lived, as a series of events and misunderstandings threaten to tear them apart.

The family faces various challenges, including the return of Sukollan, who reveals a long-hidden truth about Jhum and Debolina's past. Meanwhile, Gungun discovers her real identity and forms a bond with Adil, her long-lost brother.

As the story unfolds, Gungun and Soujanyo's love is put to the test. The family must come to terms with their mistakes and learn to forgive and understand each other.

The show takes a dramatic turn with Gungun's sudden death, leaving behind a devastated Soujanyo and their young son. The story jumps 25 years forward, where Dr. Sourin "Ishaan" Mukherjee, Gungun and Soujanyo's son, is introduced. He falls in love with Dr. Shrotoshwini "Gungun" Majumder, a therapist. The family is overjoyed to see history repeat itself, as the next generation of Soujanyo and Gungun embark on their own journey of love and discovery.

== Cast ==
=== Main ===
- Trina Saha Bhattacharya as
  - Shrotoshwini "Gungun" Mukherjee (née Bose) – Dr. Kaushik and Shilpi's daughter; Tinni's cousin and rival; Babin's wife; Ishaan's mother (Dead) (2020–2022)
  - Shrotoshwini "Gungun" Majumder – A therapist; Sourin's love interest (2022).
- Koushik Roy as
  - Soujanyo "Babin" Mukherjee aka Crazy – A scientist; Bhajan and Chandana's son; Chini's brother; Riju, Munia and Shaaji's cousin; Gungun's widower; Ishaan's Father (2020–2022)
  - Dr. Sourin "Ishaan" Mukherjee – An oncologist; Gungun and Soujanyo's son (2022)

=== Recurring ===
- Dulal Lahiri as Siddheshwar "Jethai" Mukherjee – Bhajan, Putu and Potka's brother; Nonibala's widower; Riju and Munia's father; Adil and Puchu's grandfather. (2020–2022)
- Ratna Ghoshal as Nonibala "Jethi" Mukherjee – Siddheshwar's wife; Riju and Munia's mother; Adil and Puchu's grandmother. (2020–2022) (Dead).
- Chandan Sen as Trilokeshwar "Bhajan" Mukherjee – Jethai, Putu and Potka's brother; Chandana's husband; Babin and Chini's father; Ishaan's grandfather (2020–2022)
- Anushree Das as Basumati "Chandana" Mukherjee – Bhajan's wife; Babin and Chini's Mother; Ishaan's grandmother. (2020–2022)
- Sohini Sengupta Meghomala "Putu" Mukerjee Chatterjee – A Teacher; Jethai, Bhajan and Potka's sister; Sukalyan's wife. (2020–2022) (Dead)
- Badshah Moitra as Dr. Sukalyan Chatterjee – Putu's husband. (2020–2021)
- Ambarish Bhattacharya as Kamaleshwar "Potka" Mukherjee – Jethai, Bhajan and Putu's brother; Jaya's husband; Shaaji's father.(2020–2022)
- Jayashree Mukherjee Kaul as Suchitra "Jaya" Mukherjee – Potka's wife; Shaaji's mother. (2020–2022)
- Debottam Majumdar as Abhijnan "Riju" Mukherjee – Jethai and Nonibala's son; Munia's brother; Babin, Chini and Shaaji's cousin; Mishti's husband; Puchu's father (2020–2022)
- Rajanya Mitra as Nabamita "Mishti" Mukherjee – Riju's wife; Puchu's mother (2020–2022)
- Priyanka Mitra as Imon "Chini" Mukherjee Chatterjee – Bhajan and Chandana's daughter; Babin's sister; Riju, Munia and Shaaji's cousin; Rupanjan's wife (2020–2022)
- Raja Goswami as Rupanjan Chatterjee – Chini's husband (2020–2022)
- Sonal Mishra as Doyelpakhi "Shaaji" Mukherjee Singha – A college professor; Potka and Jaya's daughter; Riju, Munia, Babin and Chini's cousin; Gungun's friend; Sroth's ex-wife; Arjun's wife (2020–2022)
- Sayanta Modak as Dr. Arjun Singha – A professor; Shaaji's second husband (2022)
- Abhishek Chatterjee as Dr. Kaushik Bose – A Surgeon; Jui's brother; Shilpi's husband; Gungun's father; Ishaan's grandfather. (2020–2022) (Dead)
- Malabika Sen as Dr. Shilpi Bose – Kaushik's widow; Gungun's mother; Ishaan's grandmother. (2020–2022)
- Suchismita Chowdhury as Jui Bose Sengupta – Kaushik's sister; Tinni's mother; Gungun's aunt. (2020–2022)
- Debasish Roy Chowdhury as Partha Chatterjee - Rupanjan's father.
- Madhumita Basu as Mandira Chatterjee - Rupanjan's mother.
- Rukma Roy as Ananya "Tinni" Sengupta – Jui's daughter; Dr. Kaushik's niece; Gungun's cousin and rival; Babin's research assistant. (2020–2021)
- Sayantan Halder as Sroth Sengupta – Shaji's ex-husband (2022)
- Rishav Basu as Adil "Adi" Sheikh – Munia's son, Riju, Babin, Chini's and Shaaji's nephew, Siddheshwar & Nonibala's grandson. (2021)
- Sujoy Biswas as Soujanyo's Institute's Dean. (2020–2022)
- Arup Kumar Roy as Shubho Banerjee (2021)
- Atmandeep Ghosh as Krish – Gungun's namesake boyfriend. (2020)
- Asmee Ghosh as Jhum – Sukalyan's adopted daughter. (2020–2021)
- Kanyakumari Mukherjee as Deblina – Jhum's mother. (2020–2021)
- Diganta Bagchi as lawyer of Tinni. (2021)
- Shampa Banerjee as lawyer of Soujanyo. (2021)
- Chitra Sen as Kanakbala (2021)
- Chaitali Chakraborty as Sroth's mother. (2022)

== Reception ==
=== Ratings ===
| Week | Year | BARC Viewership | | Ref. |
| Week | Year | TRP | Rank | Ref. |
|---|---|---|---|---|
| Week 37 | 2020 | 5.4 | 4 | |
| Week 38 | 2020 | 5.2 | 4 | |
| Week 39 | 2020 | 5.0 | 4 | |
| Week 40 | 2020 | 5.1 | 3 | |
| Week 42 | 2020 | 4.8 | 4 | |
| Week 43 | 2020 | 4.6 | 4 | |
| Week 44 | 2020 | 5.3 | 3 | |
| Week 45 | 2020 | 5.5 | 3 | |
| Week 46 | 2020 | 5.3 | 3 | |
| Week 47 | 2020 | 5.9 | 2 | |
| Week 48 | 2020 | 5.8 | 3 | |
| Week 49 | 2020 | 6.3 | 2 | |
| Week 52 | 2020 | 5.7 | 4 | |
| Week 9 | 2021 | 4.8 | 2 | |
| Week 10 | 2021 | 4.1 | 5 | |

== Adaptations ==
| Language | Title | Original release | Network(s) | Last aired | Notes | Ref. |
|---|---|---|---|---|---|---|
| Tamil | Namma Veetu Ponnu நம்ம வீட்டு பொண்ணு | 16 August 2021 | Star Vijay | 25 March 2023 | Remake | |
| Marathi | Thipkyanchi Rangoli ठिपक्यांची रांगोळी | 4 October 2021 | Star Pravah | 18 November 2023 | Remake | |
| Malayalam | Palunku പളുങ്ക് | 22 November 2021 | Asianet | 30 December 2022 | Remake | |
| Hindi | Kabhi Kabhie Ittefaq Sey कभी कभी इत्तेफाक से | 3 January 2022 | StarPlus | 20 August 2022 | Remake | |
| Kannada | Jenugudu ಜೇನುಗೂಡು | 21 February 2022 | Star Suvarna | 30 September 2023 | Remake | |
| Telugu | Pallakilo Pellikuturu పల్లకిలో పెళ్ళికూతురు | 26 September 2022 | Star Maa | 13 May 2023 | Remake | |
