= Amader Dadamoni =

2025 Indian Bengali language TV series

- Genre: Drama; Romance; Family drama
- Based on: Anna
- Screenplay by: Sounav Basu
- Story by: Nilanjana Sharma, Shubhajyoti Bhadra
- Directed by: Gopal Chakraborty
- Starring: Pratik Sen; Anushkaa Chakraborty; Debesh Chattopadhyay
- Music by: Shovan Ganguly
- Country of origin: India
- Original language: Bengali
- No. of episodes: 247

Production
- Executive producers: Rana Mukherjee; Somnath Das; Rezan Khan (Nini Chini's Mamma's Production House); Shreyasi Chakraborty; Ahona Chakraborty (Zee Bangla)
- Producer: Nilanjana Sharma
- Production location: Kolkata
- Cinematography: Kiranjoy Bhuiyan
- Editors: Swapan, Tanmay, Sarthak and Debasish
- Camera setup: Multi-Camera
- Running time: 22 minutes
- Production company: Nini Chini's Mamma's Production House

Original release
- Network: Zee Bangla
- Release: 7 July 2025 – 17 April 2026

Amader Dadamoni is an Indian Bengali language television drama series that premiered from 7 July 2025 on Zee Bangla. It is produced by Nilanjana Sharma's Nini Chini's Mamma's Production House. It is the official remake of Tamil TV series Anna. The serial stars Pratik Sen in the titular role of Dadamoni with Anushkaa Chakraborty in the female lead.

== Plot ==
Set against the backdrop of suburban Bengal, Amader Dadamoni centers around Someshwar Dutta (Dadamoni), a principled and compassionate elder brother who has dedicated his entire life to raising his four younger siblings and his drunkard father.

Dadamoni while serving as emotional pillar and moral guide for his family, is also a person who is over-protective. His primary goal is to get his sisters married into caring families, not realising that the girls have their own dreams and aspirations in life. Despite personal setbacks, Dadamoni chooses to prioritize the well-being and dreams of his sisters above all else. His quiet sacrifices go unnoticed until the very foundation of the family is tested by external challenges, misunderstandings, and societal pressures. As the story unfolds, Dadamoni's unwavering values and silent strength become both his greatest asset and most painful burden.

On the other hand, you have Parbati, who has become a doctor, but still shackled by the iron hand of her father, who believes that women do not have any other duty, but to serve their husband. The serial narrative navigates through these moral dilemmas, sibling conflicts, emotional moments, and heartfelt reconciliations—highlighting how love, forms the bedrock of every resilient family.

== Cast ==
=== Main ===
- Pratik Sen as Someshwar "Som" Dutta; Grocery store owner; Ratna, Rani, Reshmi, and Rimli's elder brother "Dadamoni"; Shibeshward Dutta's eldest child, Parvati (Paro)'s Husband
  - Jishnu Bhattacharya as Child Som
- Anushkaa Chakraborty as Parvati "Paro" Ray - A doctor; Parthasarathi Ray and Baroma's daughter, Som's Wife, Ratna, Rani, Reshmi, and Rimli's Sister-in-law, Pratap Ray's younger sister, Palash Ray's younger sister.
  - Priyankshita Samanta as Child Parvati

=== Recurring ===
Dutta family

- Subhadra Mukherjee as Saudamini Dutta; Shibeshwar Dutta's wife, Som, Ratna, Reshmi, Rani and Rimli's mother
- Sumit Datta as Shibeshwar Dutta, Som, Ratna, Reshmi, Rani and Rimli's father.
- Ujani Dasgupta as Ratna; a school teacher; Someshwar's first younger sister; Rani, Reshmi and Rimli's elder sister
- Subhanshee Dutta as Reshmi: Someshwar's second younger sister; Ratna's younger sister; Rani and Rimli's elder sister
- Suchandra Bhattacharya as Rani: Someshwar's third younger sister, Ratna and Reshmi's younger sister; Rimli's elder sister; very good in managing finances, considered the Finance Minister of the house, Pratap's Wife .
- Kritika Chakraborty as Rimli: Someshwar, Ratna, Reshmi and Rani's youngest sister; she was adopted by Som as a very young child.

Ray family

- Debesh Chattopadhyay as Partha Sarathi Ray aka Ray Shaheb- Pratap, Parbati and Palash's father, Baroma's husband.
- Pritha Bandopadhyay as Subhalaxmi Ray aka Laxmi/Baroma/Laxmi Maa - Partha Sarathi Ray's first wife, Pratap Ray, Parbati and Palash's mother.
- Moushumi Chakraborty as Sulakshana Ray/Chotoma - Partha Sarathi Ray's second wife.
- Gambhira Bhattacharya: as Pratap Narayan Ray; Parthasarathi Ray and Baroma's elder son; Parbati and Palash's elder brother, Rani's Husband.
- Shovan Chakraborty as Palash Ray; Parthasarathi Ray and Baroma's youngest son; Pratap and Parbati's younger brother, Rani's Brother-in-law.
- Rumpa Chatterjee as Apaprabha aka Prabha - Parthasarathi Ray's younger sister; Pratap, Parbati and Palash's paternal aunt

=== Others ===
- Soma Banerjee as Kalyani Sen
- Atri Bhattacharya as Dilip Sen
- Anirban Paitandi as Pradip Sen
- Rusha Mukherjee as Moyna
- Ritwick Purakait as Ankur; Ratna's husband
- Kunal Banerjee as Kaju
- Prannoy Chandra as Dr. Siddharth; Parvati's former love interest and ex fianceé
- Sulagna Mukhopadhyay as Dr. Siddharth wife
- Kaustav Chaudhari as Amlan; Ratna's love interest and ex-husband
- Unknown as Barnali, Pratap's ex-fiancé and Shom's namesake sister
- Palash Adhikary as Auto Rickshaw driver

== Adaptations ==
Language	Title	Original release	Network(s)	Last aired	Notes
Tamil	Anna அண்ணா	22 May 2023	Zee Tamil	18 January 2026	Original
Telugu	Maa Annayya మా అన్నయ్యా	25 March 2024	Zee Telugu	7 June 2025	Remake
Marathi	Lakhat Ek Aamcha Dada लाखात एक आमचा दादा	8 July 2024	Zee Marathi	4 October 2025	Remake
Kannada	Annayya ಅಣ್ಣಯ್ಯ	12 August 2024	Zee Kannada	Ongoing	Remake
Bengali	Amader Dadamoni আমাদের দাদামনি	7 July 2025	Zee Bangla	17 April 2026	Remake
Malayalam	Valyettan വല്യേട്ടൻ	20 April 2026	Zee Keralam	Ongoing	Remake
