= Khokababu (TV series) =

Bengali television series

- Genre: Soap opera
- Created by: Blues Productions
- Written by: Snehasish Chakraborty
- Directed by: Swapan Nandi; Bapon Pramanik
- Starring: Pratik Sen; Trina Saha; Kushal Chakraborty; Mousumi Saha; Debjani Chattopadhyay; Bimal Chakraborty; Aditya Chowdhury
- Opening theme: Khokababu
- Composer: Snehasish Chakraborty
- Country of origin: India
- Original language: Bengali
- No. of seasons: 1
- No. of episodes: 805

Production
- Executive producers: Taniya Chakrabarti; Supriyo Mukherjee; Runa De Sarkar
- Producer: Snehasish Chakraborty
- Production location: Kolkata
- Running time: 19 - 22 minutes
- Production company: Blues Productions

Original release
- Network: Star Jalsha
- Release: 9 May 2016 – 29 July 2018

Khokababu is a Bengali television soap opera that premiered on 9 May 2016 on Star Jalsha. Produced by Snehasish Chakraborty, it stars Pratik Sen and Trina Saha in lead role. The series ended on 29 July 2018.

== Plot ==
Khoka, an innocent wrestler from Kusumpur, falls in love with Tori, a spoilt brat from Kolkata. Khoka is very innocent with having moral values. He obeys his mother Koushalya very much and loves his family. On other side Tori, is totally opposite in nature of Khoka. But Tori has a good heart. Tori's marriage is fixed with Preet and the engagement is also done. Coincidentally one day Khoka and Tori meet and get into a heated argument. Khoka keeps himself away from Tori because he is a Baal Brahmachaari and Tori too dislikes him initially before they eventually get married.

== Cast ==
=== Main ===
- Pratik Sen as Raghunath Mukherjee a.k.a. Khokababu, Tori's husband.
- Trina Saha as Tori Mukherjee (nee Ganguly), Khokababu's wife

=== Recurring ===
- Rupsha Chakraborty as Oishee Ganguly
- Debjani Chattopadhyay as Anuradha Ganguly
- Mousumi Saha as Koushalya Mukherjee
- Kushal Chakraborty as Jagannath Mukherjee
- Bimal Chakraborty as Raj Sekhar Ganguly
- Aditya Chowdhury as Preet
- Raja Chatterjee as Paresh Mukherjee a.k.a. Paresh President
- Srabanti Mukherjee as Arati Mukherjee
- Puja Ganguly as Shila
- Upanita Banerjee / Misty Singh as Bani
- Purbasha Roy as Mayuri
- Tapashi Roy Chowdhury as Rajlekha Ganguly, Tithi's Mother
- Meghna Mukherjee as Tithi
- Sougata Dasgupta as Turjo
- Madhurima Basak as Raka Bose

== Adaptations ==
Language	Title	Original release	Network(s)	Last aired	Notes
Tamil	Chinna Thambi சின்னத்தம்பி	2 October 2017	Star Vijay	21 June 2019	Remake
Telugu	Savitramma Gari Abbayi సావిత్రిమమాగరి అబ్బాయి	11 March 2019	Star Maa	28 August 2021	Remake
Hindi	Amma Ke Babu Ki Baby अम्मा के बाबु की बेबी	8 February 2021	Star Bharat	31 May 2021	Remake
Gujarati	Dil Dangal દિલ દંગલ	2 October 2025	Colors Gujarati	23 February 2026	Remake
Kannada	Maryadhe Ramanna ಮರ್ಯಾದೆ ರಾಮಣ್ಣ	25 May 2026	Star Suvarna	Ongoing	Remake
