= Miss Lovely =

2012 film

- Film poster
- Directed by: Ashim Ahluwalia
- Written by: Ashim Ahluwalia; Uttam Sirur
- Produced by: Shumona Goel; Sanjay Shah; Pinaki Chatterjee
- Starring: Nawazuddin Siddiqui; Niharika Singh; Menaka Lalwani; Anil George; Zeena Bhatia
- Cinematography: K. U. Mohanan
- Edited by: Paresh Kamdar; Ashim Ahluwalia
- Music by: Ilaiyaraaja; Cloudland Canyon; Kip Uhlhorn
- Distributed by: Easel Films; Eagle Movies
- Release dates: 24 May 2012 (Cannes); 17 January 2014 (India)
- Running time: 110 minutes
- Country: India
- Language: Hindi

Miss Lovely is a 2012 Indian drama film directed by Ashim Ahluwalia and set in the criminal depths of Mumbai's C-grade (horror and porn film) industry. Ahluwalia's debut feature follows the story of the Duggal brothers who produce sleazy sex-horror films in the mid-1980s. The plot explores the intense and mutually destructive relationship between younger sibling Sonu Duggal, played by Nawazuddin Siddiqui, and his elder brother, Vicky (Anil George). Sonu finds himself drawn to a mysterious young woman named Pinky (Niharika Singh) eventually leading to his downfall. Miss Lovely had its cinematic release on 17 January 2014 across 300 screens in India. The film won the Special Jury Award (Feature film) and Best Production Design Award at the 61st National Film Awards.

The stylized form, densely layered narrative, period costumes and production design simultaneously convey a pulp style and contemporaneous modernity. Jonathan Romney of Sight & Sound described the film as "A shock to the system – an Indian film like I'd never seen." The film constantly switches between genre pieces and is part hard-boiled film noir, part love story, part melodrama and part documentary. It has been compared to Rainer Werner Fassbinder's The Bitter Tears of Petra von Kant, and Wong Kar Wai's Chungking Express.

Shot on a combination of Kodak Super 16 and 35mm film in widescreen, the central themes of Miss Lovely include repressed sexuality, censorship, the deconstruction of genre, the material nature of celluloid and the extinction of cinema itself. The film soundtrack also links back to a history of past cinema, particularly the use of the rare work of Italian composers Egisto Macchi and Piero Umiliani, who had both scored exploitation films. The soundtrack also employs film scores by Indian composer Ilaiyaraaja and disco producer Biddu.

Miss Lovely competed in the Un Certain Regard section at the 2012 Cannes Film Festival. The film has since screened at numerous film festivals including the Toronto International Film Festival and International Film Festival Rotterdam.

== Cast ==
- Nawazuddin Siddiqui as Sonu Duggal
- Niharika Singh as Sonika/Pinky
- Anil George as Vicky Duggal
- Zeena Bhatia as Poonam
- Menaka Lalwani as Nadia Khan
- Ragesh Asthanaa as PK
- Manoj Bakshi as Heera Seherwala

== Development ==
The project started as a documentary on C-grade sex cinema in the lower depths of Bollywood which flourished between the 1970s and the early 2000s when it was eventually made redundant by anonymous internet pornography. During work on the documentary, the director discovered that none of the subjects were willing to appear on camera as shooting pornography in India constitutes a serious criminal offense. The documentary was subsequently shelved. The project was later reworked into a feature film script and set in the past so as to protect the identities of individual subjects and their actual stories. The Central Board of Film Certification (CBFC) gave an 'A' certification to the film.

== Reception ==
Initial reviews to Miss Lovely at Cannes were contradictory. Expecting a more mainstream film, The Hollywood Reporter noted that "Miss Lovely sets out to prove that Indian cinema can be as frustratingly opaque as a European art movie [and] succeeds rather too well."

In complete contrast, Variety's Alissa Simon gave the film a glowing review, saying "Something new in Indian filmmaking, neither Bollywood nor traditional art cinema, the pic provides a unique, immersive experience...one that owes as much to docu and experimental filmmakers as to Scorsese, Welles and von Sternberg, plunging viewers into the characters' social milieu."

Sight & Sound's Jonathan Romney described the director Ashim Ahluwalia as "a very impressive talent, and given the oppressive conventions of the Indian film industry, he's clearly an independent spirit and then some."

Film Comment's Gavin Smith felt that the film was the strongest in the Un Certain Regard section writing "I hope we do hear more from Indian director Ashim Ahluwalia, whose lively, fast-and-loose Miss Lovely, about two brothers toiling in the world of Bollywood B-movie and softcore porn production in the Eighties, had an off-kilter, at times delirious first hour and then settled into a pungent story of jealousy, betrayal, and doomed love."

Libertas Film Magazine's Joe Bendel noted, "This is clearly a milieu Ahluwalia fully understands. Straddling genres, he toys with crime story elements, but essentially tells a Cain and Abel tale, skewering India's celebrity-obsessed culture and sexual mores along the way. Stylistically, he spans the gamut from trippily disorienting to in-your-face naturalism. This is kitchen-sink filmmaking at its most relentlessly indie. Part expose and part fall-from-grace epic, Miss Lovely is highly recommended for those who simply love films about filmmaking."

Le Monde's Jacques Mandelbaum wrote, "Miss Lovely (is) a splendid film that invites admiration. Through this tragic story set between 1986 and 1993, Ahluwalia films the changing of an era... His direction, full of archival period films, beautifully uses the art of editing, color and off-screen space. One feels a real affection for this admittedly sordid universe, but with a magnificence that the conversion of India to the market economy will simply wipe out."

Another Magazine's Simon Jablonski reviewed the film, saying "Among all that glitters at Cannes Film Festival, there was little quite as visually spectacular as Miss Lovely, directed by Ashim Ahluwalia. In the midst of India's moralistic and conservative codes of censorship, Miss Lovely dived into the world of the secret sex and horror C-movie scene of 80s Bombay. Constantly moving and switching between genre pieces – a gangster flick then a love story then an art house film. Stylistically it's reminiscent of 90s Chinese cinema such as Chungking Express than anything you'd associate with the Bollywood tradition while the wonderfully extravagant costumes and sets call to mind Rainer Fassbinder's The Bitter Tears Of Petra von Kant."

Indian film critic Nandini Ramnath described the film in Mint as "a universe of retro pleasures and pain, atmospheric interiors and decaying exteriors, marginal characters and forbidden dreams… The story follows, but often wanders away from, Sonu's fallout with his brother, his attempts to go solo and his love for Pinky. Amid a hypnotic interplay of colours, tones and textures that has been shot by cinematographer Mohanan, we see Mumbai like it's rarely been seen before… This is pre-globalized Mumbai at its most evocative and perilous. If you feel uneasy while watching the film, you're meant to."

The New York Times's Joan Dupont profiled Miss Lovely and the director Ashim Ahluwalia in a piece titled "Mumbai in the Bad Old Days"

On the review aggregator website Rotten Tomatoes, 56% of 16 critics' reviews are positive, with an average rating of 5.5/10. Metacritic, which uses a weighted average, assigned the film a score of 52 out of 100, based on 9 critics, indicating "mixed or average" reviews.

Miss Lovely has won multiple awards including Best Film in the "India Gold" category at the 14th Mumbai Film Festival and Best Feature Film Award at the 11th Indian Film Festival of Los Angeles.

== Awards ==
National Film Awards

- National Film Award – Special Jury Award (Feature film) (director) – Ashim Ahluwalia
- National Film Award for Best Production Design – Ashim Ahluwalia, Tabasheer Zutshi and Parichit Paralkar
