= Ahaan =

2019 Bollywood film

- Film Poster
- Directed by: Nikhil Pherwani
- Screenplay by: Nikhil Pherwani
- Story by: Nikhil Pherwani; Abhishek Pherwani
- Produced by: Will Finds Way Films
- Starring: Arif Zakaria; Niharika Singh; Abuli Mamaji; Plabita Borthakur; Rajit Kapur
- Cinematography: Saket Gyani; Dipankar Sikder
- Edited by: Jitendra Prakash Dongare; Anupama Chabukswar
- Music by: Dhruv Dhalla
- Production company: Will Finds Way Films
- Distributed by: Netflix
- Release dates: August 2019 (Indian Film Festival of Melbourne); 19 March 2021 (India)
- Running time: 81 minutes
- Country: India
- Languages: Hindi; English

Ahaan is a 2019 Indian comedy-drama film written and directed by Nikhil Pherwani. Starring Arif Zakaria, Niharika Singh, Plabita Borthakur and Rajit Kapur and produced by Will Finds Way Films, Ahaan is India's first Hindi-language film starring a person with Down syndrome in the leading role, played by newcomer Abuli Mamaji.

The film premiered at the Indian Film Festival of Melbourne in 2019, had its theatrical release in India on 19 March 2021 and premiered on Netflix on 15 May 2021.

== Synopsis ==
Jilted by his wife, a man with OCD finds eye-opening common ground and camaraderie with his neighbour, a young man with Down Syndrome.

== Cast ==
- Abuli Mamaji as Ahaan
- Arif Zakaria as Ozzy
- Niharika Singh as Anu
- Plabita Borthakur as Onella
- Rajit Kapur as Psychologist
- Shilpa Mehta as Gayatri
- Kaizaad Kotwaal as Ranjit
- Sonali Sachdev as Mrs. Nair
- Haresh Raut as Hari

== Production ==
Nikhil Pherwani's observations made him realize how disabled individuals were treated differently, sometimes even less than human. This made him ponder on a few things – What goes on in the life of a young adult with intellectual disability? How do their parents cope with uncertainty about their child's future? Are they capable of leading an independent life? He went on to meet people with intellectual disabilities and their parents to understand their world better. The research gave an insight into many personal stories and this gave birth to the idea of the film.

With a screenplay in hand, he set out to meet several producers. However, producing the film was usually perceived as a challenge, owing to prejudices about the commercial viability of film dealing with such subject matter. Eventually, Nikhil Pherwani and his brother Abhishek produced it themselves, under their banner 'Will Finds Way Films' to safeguard the artistic integrity of the project.

== Casting ==
Nikhil Pherwani met Abuli Mamaji at an NGO committed to the empowerment and development of intellectually disabled young adults. It was here that Mamaji told the director about his dream to be an actor. Fascinated by his statement, the director met him again from a research perspective and in the process landed up casting him for the titular role.

Pherwani said in an interview to Free Press Journal, "If you are making a film on disability, the principal aim is to encourage inclusion. So, the best way to do that would be to encourage him to be an actor in my film. Also, in terms of representation this was the most accurate. If I had roped in an actor to play a differently-abled man he may not have been able to portray the nuances in the right manner. Somewhere down the line it wouldn't have been true to character. Of course, one had to go through a lot of training with him. But with him you could never go wrong with things like body language and mannerisms. There was no chance of it becoming a caricature. I wanted it to be as real as possible."

== Release ==
Ahaan released theatrically in India on 19 March 2021 and premiered on Netflix on 15 May 2021.

== Critical reception ==
Ahaan was acclaimed by critics with particular praise for the direction and performances. On the review aggregator website Rotten Tomatoes, 80% of 5 critics' reviews are positive, with an average rating of 6.5/10.

Sreeparna Sengupta of Times of India gave the film a rating of 3.5/5 stars and praised the film, remarking 'Nikhil Pherwani, who has scripted and directed Ahaan, infuses the film's narrative with a warm energy, even as he brings to light the life, limitations and aspirations of a person with Down syndrome. And to the filmmaker's credit, he does this without getting preachy and with a lot of empathy.

Saibal Chatterjee of NDTV wrote: The director deserves a pat on the back for not casting a regular actor in the role of a character with Down syndrome. That would have been the easy way out. But it would have been far less effective.

Udita Jhunjhunwala of Scroll wrote, 'A well-paced, if unsubtle, narrative, Ahaan is an optimistic, feelgood film that genially works towards normalising mental development disabilities and mental health issues.'

Anna M. M. Vetticad of Firstpost gave it 3.5/5 stars and wrote, 'This entertaining, insightful film is poignant precisely because it does not set out to be a tearjerker. This and the casting are what make it a landmark in Indian cinema.

Variety recommended Ahaan in the 'New Movies to Watch This Week' Column by Peter Debruge, Chief Film Critic - Variety.

Moneycontrol featured Ahaan in an Independence Day Series of 75 brave new Indian films that capture a million different ideas of India.
