= The Film (film) =

2005 Indian film

- Theatrical release poster
- Directed by: Junaid Memon
- Story by: Junaid Memon
- Produced by: Amitabh Bhattacharya; Junaid Memon
- Starring: Mahima Chaudhry; Khalid Siddiqui
- Cinematography: Amitabha Singh; Ayhan Ghanim
- Edited by: Ajay Kedare
- Music by: Samidha-Khalid; Siddharth-Suhas
- Production company: AB Corp
- Distributed by: Nomad Films
- Release date: 25 November 2005
- Running time: 144 minutes
- Country: India
- Language: Hindi

The Film is a 2005 Indian Hindi-language thriller film directed by Junaid Memon, produced by Amitabh Bhattacharya & Junaid Memon. It stars Mahima Chaudhry, Khalid Siddiqui, Ananya Khare, Chahat Khanna, Ravi Gossain, Vaibhav Jhalani and Vivek Madan with Sulabha Deshpande, Mukesh Khanna, Nasser Abdullah and Rakesh Bedi in important supporting roles with a voice-over by Irrfan Khan. The film focuses on seven strugglers who, after failing constantly in their attempts to enter the Bollywood industry, choose the path of crime to achieve this end.

== Plot Summary ==
Seven aspiring artists: Sushmita, Nandini, Ankita, Aditya, Vijay, Raman, and Irfan, struggle to break into the Bollywood industry while living together in a boarding house owned by Mrs. Braganza. Desperate for funds to finance their cinematic dreams, they decide to pose as henchmen for a notorious Dubai-based Don, Shamim Bhai, to extort ₹100 million from a wealthy financier Sharad Shah.

Their plan quickly unravels when the police track a stolen phone used in the crime. As the group flees with the cash, a series of tragedies strikes, Irfan is murdered by the real gang in a case of mistaken identity. Nandini is killed by an unknown assailant just as she prepares to confess to the police. Mrs. Braganza commits suicide following a humiliating police interrogation regarding her tenants' crimes. Raman dies from an accidental injury during a heated, drunken confrontation with the survivors, Ankita and Vijay are killed during a final skirmish with the police and the real gang.

In the chilling climax, the sole survivor, Aditya, realizes that Sushmita, the aspiring writer, was the mastermind behind the chaos. She intentionally manipulated the events and orchestrated the deaths of her friends to create a "true story" for her screenplay. To complete her masterpiece, she kills Aditya and drags his body away, finally securing the ultimate script for her movie, "The Film."

== Cast ==
- Mahima Chaudhry as Sushmita Banerjee
- Khalid Siddiqui as Vijay Khatri
- Ananya Khare as Nandini Shetty
- Chahat Khanna as Ankita Kulkarni
- Ravi Gossain as Raman Raawal
- Vaibhav Jhalani as Aditya Sharma
- Vivek Madan as Irfan Lucknowi
- Mukesh Khanna as Police Commissioner of Mumbai
- Sulabha Deshpande as Mrs. Braganza
- Nassar Abdullah as Inspector Javed Khan
- Rakesh Bedi as Pappi Da (a pun on Bappi Lahiri)
- Ranvir Shorey as Filmmaker Kaushik
- Irrfan Khan as voice-over of Shamim Bhai
- Satyen Kappu as Guruji (Raman's music teacher)
- Kenneth Desai as Filmmaker Dutta

== Critical reception ==
Taran Adarsh rated the film 1.5 out 5, writing, "THE FILM is a decent attempt by a first-time director, who has focused more on the story than the stars." Indrani Roy Mitra from Rediff.com praised the film, describing it as "a laudable effort" from Memon.
