= Naan Aval Adhu =

Unreleased film directed by Kona Venkat

- Theatrical release poster
- Directed by: Kona Venkat
- Written by: Kona Venkat
- Produced by: Saurav Sharma; Junaid Memon
- Starring: R. Madhavan; Shamita Shetty; Sadha
- Music by: G. V. Prakash Kumar (2 songs); R. P. Patnaik; Dharan (1 song); Prasanna
- Country: India
- Language: Tamil

Naan Aval Adhu (transl. Me, Her, It) is an unreleased Indian Tamil-language horror film directed by Kona Venkat. R. Madhavan, Shamita Shetty and Sadha featured in the leading roles, while the film had songs and score composed by four music directors including G. V. Prakash Kumar and Dharan. A remake of the Hindi film, Darling (2007), the film was initially launched in 2006 as Ram Gopal Varma's production, but was eventually sold to Storm Pictures after Varma, Venkat and Madhavan had gone through creative differences. During post-production, the unit experienced further difficulties after the producer had failed to pay technicians, and subsequently the film did not have a theatrical release.

== Cast ==
- Madhavan as Aditya
- Shamita Shetty as Geeta
- Sadha as Ashwini
- Sayaji Shinde
- Sriman
- Sunil
- Vizag Prasad
- Master Praharsha
- Baby Harshita

== Production ==
In late 2006, it was announced that Ram Gopal Varma would produce his Tamil film, which would be a remake of his own Darling (2007), and Madhavan would star in the lead role. Varma's frequent collaborator, Kona Venkat, was announced to be the film's director. In January 2007, the film developed under the tentative title of Darling with Nisha Kothari reported to have joined the cast, though this later proved to be untrue. Shamita Shetty was announced as the film's lead actress in February 2007, marking a return to Tamil films after a period of five years. Sriya Reddy was subsequently added to the film's cast, with Reliance Adlabs joining the project as co-producers with Varma. However Sriya Reddy was sacked from the film, and after further unsuccessful attempts to bring in either Isha Sharvani, Esha Deol or Nandana Sen, Sadha was signed on for the role. The title of the film was changed to Leelai to recoup tax benefits.

The team began filming the first schedule at Ramoji Film City in Hyderabad during February 2007 with Madhavan and Shamita Shetty, and the makers announced that the film would also be dubbed and released in Telugu as Adi Oka Idile. Scenes were then canned in Chennai at the AVM Studios in June 2007, with scenes involving Sadha as the mother of a small child being shot. In mid 2007, Ram Gopal Varma opted out of the agreement and sold the film to Gaurav Sharma of Storm Pictures. Most of the filming was complete and only post-production works remained by mid 2007, with editing work taking place at Sabdalaya Theatres. During May 2008, the film was involved in a tussle over the title of Leelai, with Aascar Films claiming that they had registered the name for their own venture featuring newcomers. After losing the title, the film was renamed as Naan Aval Adhu in Tamil and Nenu Tanu Aame in Telugu. Further problems occurred when Sharma left Chennai without notice, amidst financial troubles, and consequently brought the shooting of the film to an abrupt halt. Sharma had then secretly worked on post-production works with a separate team, without informing the cast and crew of the film.

Amidst reports of the film being shelved in mid-2008, a promotional campaign suddenly began and the producer released the trailer, album and video songs from the film. In September 2008, Madhavan filed a complaint against Gaurav Sharma and Storm Pictures to the Nadigar Sangam, stating that the producer had tried to release the film without informing or paying the actors or the director. Director Kona Venkat also successfully blocked Sharma from having a promotional event to mark the release of the film's Telugu soundtrack album. The deadlock continued into early 2009, after Sharma was only able to make a small payment towards the actors' remuneration. Subsequently, Sharma tried to release the film on his own, after using dubbing artistes instead of the original actors, but was unable to finance a release. Following the success of his other horror film, Yavarum Nalam (2009), Madhavan opted to end his protest and agreed to pave way for the release of the film and completed dubbing for his portions in July 2009 at Bharani Studios, Chennai. However remaining cast and crew remained unpaid, and the film subsequently did not have a theatrical release.

== Soundtrack ==
Naan Aval Adhu

Soundtrack album by G. V. Prakash Kumar
- Released: 2008
- Genre: Film soundtrack

G. V. Prakash Kumar chronology
Ananda Thandavam (2008)	Naan Aval Adhu (2008)	Seval (2008)

The songs were composed by G. V. Prakash, Dharan, Prasanna and R. P. Patnaik, while lyrics were written by Pa. Vijay and Na. Muthukumar. The film's trailer and soundtrack album was launched at a ceremony on 9 March 2009 at Sathyam Cinemas by Amruta Patki. Owing to the commercial dispute between the technicians and the producer, none of the cast or crew were present, though the cast of Gaurav Sharma's other ongoing venture, Kalla Kadhalan, including Sibiraj were present.

No.	Title	Lyrics	Music	Performer(s)	Length
1.	"Naan Aval Adhu"	Na. Muthukumar	R. P. Patnaik	Karthik
2.	"Kaadhal Oru Kaatru"	Pa. Vijay	R. P. Patnaik	Shreya Ghoshal, Nihal
3.	"Aakayam Irangiya"	Na. Muthukumar	G. V. Prakash Kumar	Sunitha Sarathy
4.	"Nee Dooramai"	Na. Muthukumar	Prasanna	Sunitha Sarathy
5.	"Vaa Nila"	Na. Muthukumar	Dharan	Mahathi
6.	"Nenjil Thee"	Na. Muthukumar	G. V. Prakash Kumar	Kunal Ganjawala, Anushka Manchanda
