= Bappaditya Bandopadhyay =

Indian film director and poet

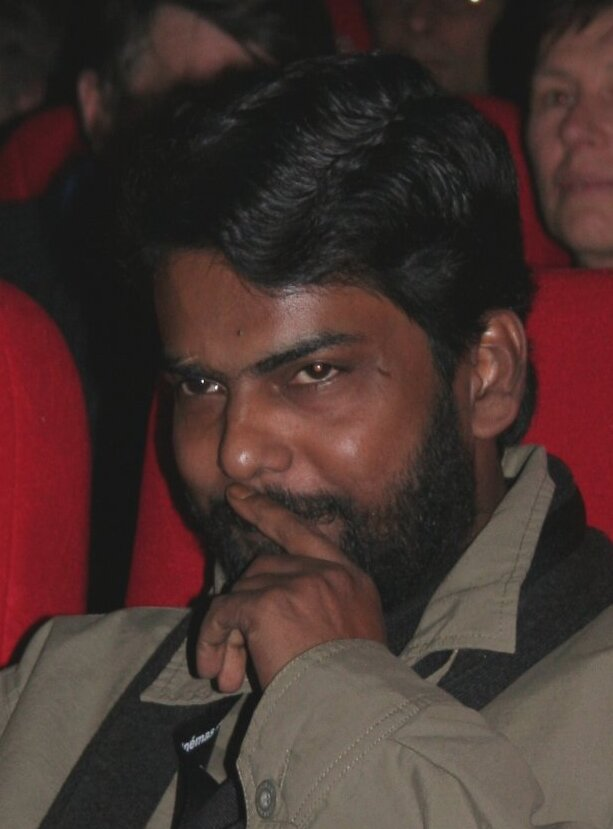
- Bandopadhyay in February 2007
- Born: 28 August 1970; Calcutta, West Bengal, India
- Died: 7 November 2015 (aged 45); Kolkata, West Bengal, India
- Education: Asutosh College
- Occupation: Director
- Years active: 2003–2015

Bappaditya Bandopadhyay (Bengali: বাপ্পাদিত্য বন্দ্যোপাধ্যায়; 28 August 1970 – 7 November 2015) was an Indian film director and poet.

== Career ==
Bandopadhyay was the recipient of the Most Promising Director award for the year 2003, by the BFJA (Bengal Film Journalists' Association). His second feature film Silpantar (Colours of Hunger) was premiered at the Sofia International Film Festival, Bulgaria. The film was selected in the competitive section of the International Film Festival Bratislava in 2003. It was the only Indian film other than Devdas selected at the 2003 Helsinki International Film Festival. Debashree Roy won the Kalakar Award for Best Actress for her performance in the film.

Bappaditya Bandopadhyay's first feature film Sampradan (The Offering of the Daughter) was selected in the competitive section of the 6th Dhaka International Film Festival, 2000. The film won three major awards in the categories of Best Supporting Actress, Best Supporting Actor and Best Female Playback Singer in the BFJA Awards that year. It also won the Dishari Award in the category of Best Music Director.

His third feature film Devaki, starring Perizaad Zorabian and Suman Ranganathan, two Bollywood actresses, in English and Hindi was released in 2006. The film was selected and screened at the Indian Osean section of the 7th Osian's Cinefan Film Festival. The film was in the competition section in the Temecula Valley International Film Festival and the Idaho International Film Festival. It also won the Best Feature Film Award at the Asheville Film Festival.

Kantatar, the fourth feature film directed by Bandopadhyay was selected in the Asian competition of the 7th Osian's Cinefan Film Festival. The film was also screened at the Raindance Film Festival in London.

Bandopadhyay also directed a television serial, Anandanagarir kathakata, on the architectural history of Kolkata for the Bengali television channel Alpha Bangla. His documentary on the tribal masks was broadcast by Doordarshan.

His film, Kagojer Bou, based on the novel of the same name by Shirshendu Mukhopadhyay, released in 2010.

He was a long time associate of the editor Dipak Mandal with whom he worked 2009 to 2015.

Bandopadhyay was also a poet. His published works include Pokader Atmiyasajan (Friends and Relatives of the Insects). He wrote regularly on the various aspects of modern cinema.

=== Death ===
Bappaditya died of multiple organ failure on 7 November 2015 in Kolkata, aged 45.

== Filmography ==
The following is the list of films directed by Bappaditya Bandopadhyay. For many of these movies, Bappaditya Bandopadhyay is also credited for the story and screenplay:

=== Director ===
Year	Film	Language	Cast
1999	Sampradan	Bengali	Anasua Majumder, Sabyasachi Chakraborty, Joy Sengupta, Papiya Adhikari, Indrani Haldar
2002	Silpantar	Bengali	Subhasish Mukherjee, Debashree Roy, Nemai Ghosh
2005	Devaki	Hindi	Perizaad Zorabian, Suman Ranganathan, Ram Kapoor
2006	Kantatar	Bengali	Sreelekha Mitra, Rudranil Ghosh, Sudip Mukherjee, Nemai Ghosh
2007	Kaal	Bengali	Chandreyee Ghosh, Sandhya Shetty, Dola Chakraborty, Samapika Debnath, Rudranil Ghosh
2009	Houseful	Bengali	Prosenjit Chatterjee, Rimjhim Gupta, Nitya ganguly, Rwita Datta Chakraborty, Sreelekha Mitra
2011	Kagojer Bou	Bengali	Paoli Dam, Rahul, Priyanka, Rimjhim, Joy Sengupta. Bratya Basu, Gargi Roy Chowdhury, Nandini Ghoshal
2012	Elar Char Adhyay	Bengali	Indraneil, Paoli Dam, Dipankar Dey, Barun Chanda, Rudranil Ghosh, Arunima Ghosh, Nitya Ganguly, Vikram Chatterjee
2013	Nayika Sangbad(2013)	Bengali	Arunima Ghosh, Indraneil Sengupta, Mumtaz Sorcer, Locket Chatterjee
2016	Sohra Bridge	Bengali	Pratik Sen, Niharika Singh, Barun Chanda, Moumita Mitra
