= Samapika Debnath =

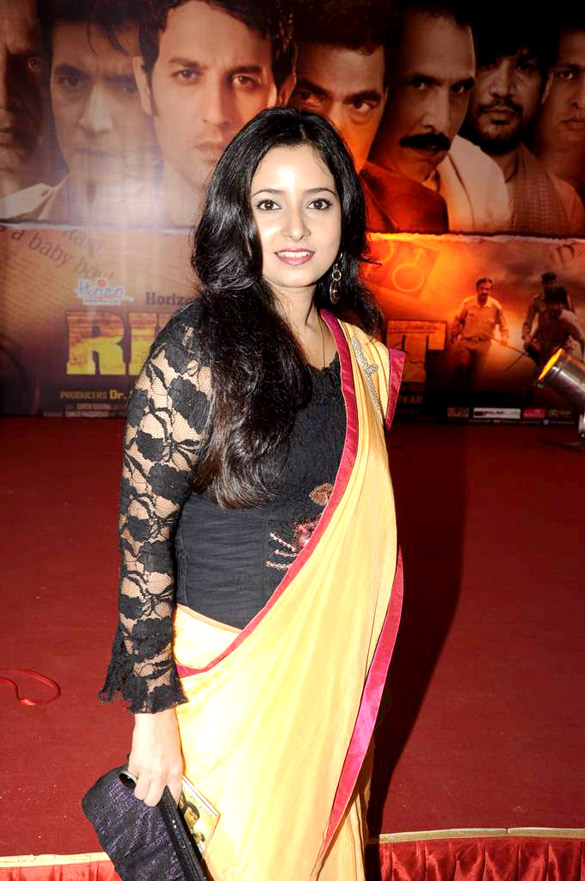
- Samapika Debnath
- Occupations: Model, actor

Samapika Debnath is an Indian film and television actress and model. She has mainly acted in Bengali and Hindi films. She made her debut in 2007 with film Kaal.

== Works ==
=== Films ===
- Astra (2012)
- Riwayat (2012)
- Shatru Sanghar (2009)
- Hello Kolkata (2008)
- Kaal

=== Television ===
- Kolkata Cocktail
- Channel VJ
- Anchoring in Sangeet Bangla
