= Savitramma Gari Abbayi =

- Genre: Drama
- Country of origin: India
- Original language: Telugu
- No. of seasons: 1
- No. of episodes: 645

Production
- Camera setup: Multi-camera
- Running time: 22 minutes

Original release
- Network: Star Maa
- Release: 11 March 2019 – 28 August 2021

Related
- Khokababu

Savitramma Gari Abbayi (transl. Son of Savitramma) is an Indian Telugu-language television drama television series airing on Star Maa from 11 March 2019 and ended on 28 August 2021. It is the remake of the StarJalsha's Bengali soap opera Khokababu. It stars Chandan Kumar and Ayesha.

== Plot ==
Balaraju, a young handsome wrestler and the most eligible bachelor in the village. While he can easily make women go weak in the knees and has a good female fan base to boast about too, he is hobbled by his word to his mother.

== Cast ==
=== Main ===
- Chandan Kumar (episodes 1–520) as Balaraju
  - Baladitya (episodes 522–645) as Balaraju (After Plastic Surgery), Savitramma's son and Nnadhini's husband/ Gaaliraju, the pickpocketer (died) (dual role)
- Ayesha (episodes 1–275)/Supritha Sathyanarayan (Episode 278 - 302) (after face transplant)/Durga Gade (episodes 303–645) as Nandini, Balaraju's wife and Savitramma's Daughter in law
- Nisha shashidhar as Nandhini a.k.a. Bujjamma
- Haritha as Savitramma, Balaraju's mother
- Siri Hanmanth as Myna (Died)

== Reception ==
The series received good reviews and was later dubbed in Kannada as S/O Savitramma
