= Ajay Rane =

Australian physician, philanthropist and humanitarian

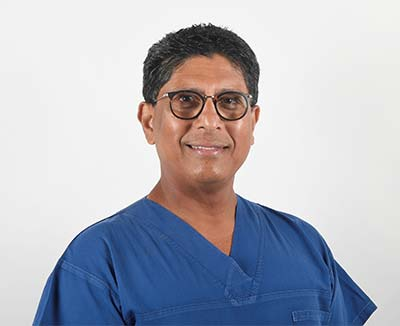
Ajay Rane, 2021

Ajay Rane is an Australian physician, philanthropist and humanitarian who has shaped the care of women with urinary incontinence and pelvic dysfunction across Queensland and globally. On Queensland Day in 2021, Rane was named as one of Queensland Greats by the Queensland Government.

== Biography ==
Rane was awarded a Bachelor of Medicine and Bachelor of Surgery from the University of Poona and a PhD from James Cook University.

Rane established Queensland's first non-metropolitan urogynaecology sub-specialty at Townsville University Hospital and is also the founding Head of the Department of Obstetrics and Gynaecology at James Cook University's School of Medicine, where he continues to undertake world-leading research in vaginal reconstructive surgery. He developed a surgical solution for bladder prolapse called “Perigee.” He researches slings and meshes for incontinence and prolapse repair.

Through his charity, Flourishing Women, Rane has encouraged the global medical community to treat women with fistula by donating time, expertise and surgical skill. An advocate and activist, Rane endeavours to protect the health and reproductive rights of the world's disadvantaged women.

== Awards ==
In 2012 Rane was a finalist in the Australian of the Year Award.

In 2013 he was awarded the Medal of the Order of Australia (OAM) and in the 2022 Queen's Birthday Honours he received the Public Service Medal.

On Queensland Day in 2021, Rane was named as one of Queensland Greats by the Queensland Government.
