= Ashim Ahluwalia =

Indian film director and producer

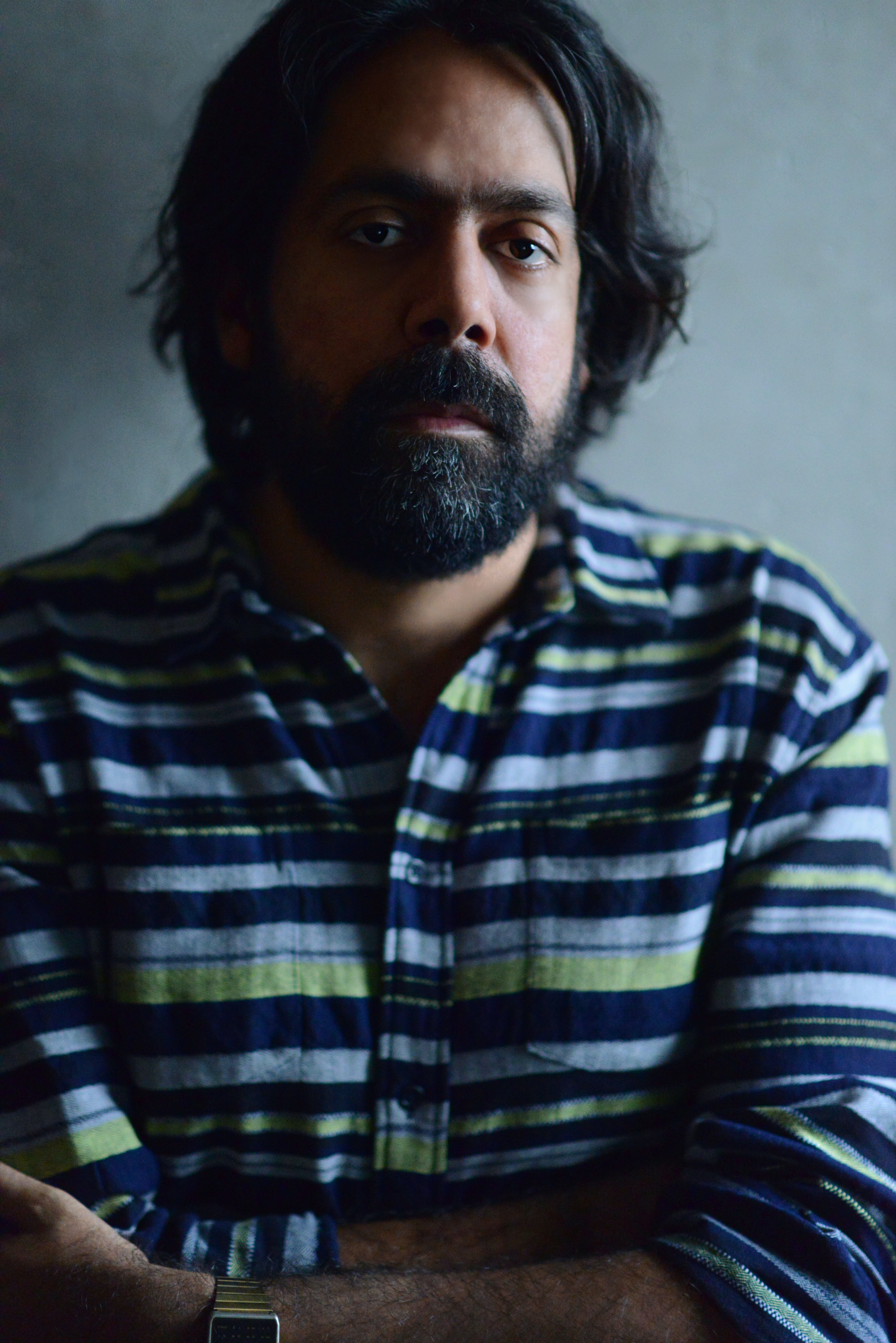
- Ashim Ahluwalia, Mumbai 2016
- Born: 1972 (age 53–54); Mumbai, India
- Occupations: Film director, producer & screenwriter
- Years active: 1999–present

Ashim Ahluwalia (born 1972 in Mumbai, India) is a film director and screenwriter. He made his directorial debut with the feature-length documentary John & Jane (2005), which had a world premiere at the Toronto International Film Festival and a European premiere at the Berlin International Film Festival, and won him the 2005 National Film Award for Best First Non-Feature Film of a Director. This was followed by his first narrative feature film Miss Lovely, premiered at the 2012 Cannes Film Festival. which won him India's National Film Award – Special Jury Award (Feature film), and Best Production Design at the 61st National Film Awards.

Working outside the mainstream Bollywood film system, Ashim Ahluwalia is part of a new generation of Indian directors. His unconventional films blur the lines between documentary and fiction. His short films have shown at the Tate Modern, the Centre Pompidou and at the Venice Architecture Biennale.

== Early life and education ==
Ashim Ahluwalia grew up in Mumbai, India. He attended the city's Cathedral and John Connon School before attending Bard College in upstate New York, from which he graduated with a BA in filmmaking in 1995.

== Career ==
Ahluwalia began his film career with a series of experimental films made between 1993 and 2002. His first short, The Dust (1993), was made by reworking home movies shot by his grandfather in the 1950s.

He formed an independent production company, Future East, in 2005, providing an infrastructure for him to work outside mainstream film channels.

Ahluwalia was selected by the San Francisco Film Society as their Artist in Residence for 2013.

In May 2013, he received the Charles Flint Kellogg Award in Arts and Letters from Bard College, his alma mater. The award is "given in recognition of a significant contribution to artistic or literary heritage."

In November 2013, he was selected to be on the jury of the 8th edition of the Rome Film Festival for the CinemaXXI section.

In 2010, Ahluwalia was named "one of the ten best emerging film directors working today" by Phaidon Press in "Take 100: The Future of Film".

== Filmography ==
=== Films ===
- Thin Air (1999)
- John & Jane (2005)
- Miss Lovely (2012)
- Events in A Cloud Chamber (2016)
- Daddy (2017)
- The Field Guide to Evil (2018)

=== Web series ===
- Class (Season 1) on Netflix (2023)

== Awards ==
- Indian National Film Award (2007) - Best Non-Fiction Film for John & Jane
- Indian National Film Award (2013) - Special Jury Award (Feature Film) for Miss Lovely
- Indian National Film Award (2013) - Best Production Design for Miss Lovely
