= Trina Saha =

Bengali television actress

- Born: 21 January; Kolkata, West Bengal, India
- Education: Shri Shikshayatan College; New Delhi Institute of Management
- Occupation: Actress
- Known for: Gungun in Khorkuto
- Notable work: Khokababu (2016); Khorkuto (2020)
- Political party: Trinamool Congress (2021–present)
- Spouse: Neel Bhattacharya (m. 2021)

Trina Saha Bhattacharya (née Saha; born 21 January) is an Indian television actress. Saha started her career in television as a lead actress through Khokababu portraying the character Tori. She has acted in many Bengali movies and TV soap operas. She has performed in many music videos like Chaina composed and sung by Shaan.

== Television ==
- All soap operas are in Bengali language, unless otherwise mentioned.

Year	Title	Role	Channels	Notes
2016–2018	Khokababu	Tori Mukherjee	Star Jalsha	
2017–2019	Jai Kali Kalkattawali	Keya	Star Jalsha	
2019	Thakurmar Jhuli	Princess Kanchanmala	Star Jalsha	
2019–2020	Koler Bou	Tepi/Tamasha (Double Role)	Star Jalsha	
2020–2022	Khorkuto	Gungun Mukherjee	Star Jalsha	
2023	Balijhor	Jhora Banerjee	Star Jalsha	
2023–2024	Love Biye Aaj Kal	Srabon Ghosh	Star Jalsha	
2025–Present	Parshuram – Ajker Nayok	Totini Ganguly	Star Jalsha	

=== Reality Shows ===
1) Dance Dance Junior Season 3 as Captain (Star Jalsha)

=== Mahalaya ===
Year	Title	Role	Channel
2018	Durgatinashini Durga	Devi Chamunda	Star Jalsha
2022	Ya Chandi	Dance Performance on Ya Chandi	Star Jalsha
2023	Ya Devi Sarvabhuteshu	Dance Performance on Rupang Dehi Jayang Dehi	Star Jalsha
2025	Matrirupeno Sanosthita	Devi Annapurna	Star Jalsha
2026	Rupe Rupantare Mahisasurmardini	Devi Kaushiki	Star Jalsha

== Filmography ==
Year	Title	Role	Director	Ref.
2015	Besh Korechi Prem Korechi	Cameo as Rai's friend	Raja Chanda	
2015	Sudhu Tomari Jonyo	Cameo as Adi's relative	Birsa Dasgupta	
2018	Dariya (short film)	Raina		
2019	Password	Tina, Nisha's Sister	Kamaleshwar Mukherjee	
2019	Thai Curry	Tamalika	Ankit Aditya	
2020	Detective	Snehalata	Joydip Mukherjee	
2022	Shrimati	Sister-in-law of Shrimati	Arjunn Dutta	
2022	Iskaboner Bibi	Anjali	Arindam Sil	
2023	Sentimentaaal	Special Appearance	Baba Yadav	

== Web series ==
- All web series are in Bengali language, unless otherwise mentioned.

Year	Title	Role	Ref.
2019	Kamini		
2020	Midnight Mirror		
2022	Murder by the Sea	Rina Das	
2023	Pilkunj	Dr. Bidita Bag	
2023-2024	Gobhir Joler Maach	Diti	

== Awards ==
Year	Award	Category	Character	Name
2017	Star Jalsha Parivaar Award 2017	Sera Juti (with Pratik)	Tori-Khoka	Khokababu
2017	Star Jalsha Parivaar Award 2017	Sera Bou	Tori	Khokababu
2018	Star Jalsha Parivaar Award 2018	Sera Bou	Tori	Khokababu
2021	Star Jalsha Parivaar Award 2021	Sera Bou	Gungun	Khorkuto
2021	Star Jalsha Parivaar Award 2021	Priyo Meye	Gungun	Khorkuto
2021	Star Jalsha Parivaar Award 2021	Style Icon Female	Gungun	Khorkuto
2021	Star Jalsha Parivaar Award 2021	Sera Juti (with Koushik)	Gungun-Soujonyo	Khorkuto
2022	West Bengal Tele Academy Awards	Best Pair (Female)	Gungun	Khorkuto
2022	Star Jalsha Parivaar Award 2022	Best Sister in-Law	Gungun	Khorkuto
2024	Star Jalsha Parivaar Award 2024	Priyo Boudi	Srabon	Love Biye Aaj Kal
2024	Star Jalsha Parivaar Award 2024	Style Icon Female	Srabon	Love Biye Aaj Kal
2025	Telly Academy Awards	Best Juti	Totini-Parashuram	Parashuram
2025	Telly Academy Awards	Best Actress	Totini	Parashuram
2025	TV 9 Bangla Ghorer Bioscope Awards	Best Actress in a Leading Role (TV Serial)	Totini	Parashuram
2026	Star Jalsha Parivaar Award 2026	Priyo Maa	Totini	Parashuram
2026	Star Jalsha Parivaar Award 2026	Star Bouma	Totini	Parashuram
2026	Star Jalsha Parivaar Award 2026	Priyo Bou	Totini	Parashuram
2026	Star Jalsha Parivaar Award 2026	Priyo Trendsetter Female	Totini	Parashuram
2026	Star Jalsha Parivaar Award 2026	Priyo Juti	Totini-Poroshruam	Parashuram
