= Amma Ke Babu Ki Baby =

Indian comedy drama TV series

- Genre: Drama; Romance; Comedy
- Developed by: Snehasish Chakravarty
- Written by: Sanjay Masum
- Screenplay by: Shweta Suman Bhardwaj
- Story by: Prakriti Mukherjee
- Directed by: Arshad Khan Dharmendra sharma
- Starring: Karan Khanna; Gouri Agarwal
- Theme music composer: Esha Gaur; Punit Dixit
- Opening theme: Amma Ke Babu Ki Baby
- Country of origin: India
- Original language: Hindi
- No. of seasons: 1
- No. of episodes: 55

Production
- Producers: Ved Raj; Esha Gaur; Gul Khan
- Cinematography: Shahbaz Khan; Shahnoor Khan
- Editors: Sanjay Kamla Singh; Manish Upadhyay
- Camera setup: Multi camera
- Running time: 21–23 minutes
- Production company: Shoonya Square Productions

Original release
- Network: Star Bharat
- Release: 8 February – 31 May 2021

Related
- Khokababu

Amma Ke Babu Ki Baby is an Indian Hindi language television series premiered on 8 February 2021 on Star Bharat. The series is a remake of Star Jalsha's Bengali series Khokababu. Produced by Ved Raj under Shoonya Square Productions and it stars Karan Khanna, Gouri Agarwal and Vibha Chibber. The series halted abruptly without conclusion on 22 April 2021 due to ratings and the global COVID-19 pandemic situation. The show was confirmed to go off air and aired its last episode after a month long hiatus on 31 May 2021.

== Plot ==
Babu is an ordinary villager, popular for his wrestling skills. His life changes due to an impolite woman named Baby, who belongs to an affluent family. Even though Babu and Baby hate each other, they accidentally get married. How they fall in love forms the crux of the story.

== Cast ==
=== Main ===
- Karan Khanna as Babu Chowdhury; Kaushalya and Jagannath's son, Baby's husband (2021)
- Gouri Agarwal as Baby Singh; Pratap and Anuradha's daughter, Babu's wife (2021)
- Vibha Chibber as Kaushalya Devi Chowdhury; Babu's mother, Jagannath's wife and Baby's mother in law (2021)

=== Recurring ===
- Manuj Bhaskar as Jagannath Chowdhury; Babu's father, Anuradha's former lover, Kaushalya's husband and Baby's father in law(2021)
- Urmila M Sharma as Sukanya–Mohan's wife, Komal and Rani's mother, Babu's aunt (2021)
- Kunal Khosla as Preet– Baby's ex fiancé (2021)
- Sapna Rathore as Tithi; Shankar's wife (2021)
- Nakul Tiwadi as Shankar; Tithi's husband (2021)
- Sumati Singh as Komal–Mohan and Sukanya's daughter (2021)
- Ashwini Shukla as Rani– Mohan and Sukanya's daughter (2021)
- Prachi Vaishnav as Nisha– Baby's best friend (2021)
- Ajay Singh as Mohan– Babu's uncle (2021)
- Sagar Saini as Pratap Singh– Baby's father, Anuradha's husband and Babu's father in law (2021)
- Dolly Sohi as Anuradha Pratap Singh– Pratap's wife, Jagannath's former lover, Baby's mother and Babu's mother in law (2021)
- Preeti Gandwani as Lata Singh- Baby's sister-in-law (2021)
- Avtar Vaishnani (2021)

== Production ==
=== Filming ===
Based on the backdrop of Varanasi, the series is mainly filmed at sets in Mumbai while some initial sequences were shot in Wai in Maharashtra.
