= 悪女 =

悪女, 惡女 or 악녀 meaning "bad girl", "evil girl", "bad woman" or "evil woman".

It may refer to:

- "Akujo" (悪女), track in Japanese album All Time Best: Utahime Cover by Akina Nakamori
- Evil Girl (惡女), Taiwanese album by Amber An
- Lost in Perfection (惡女), Taiwanese film starring Lin Mei-hsiu and Ivy Shao
- The Villainess (악녀), South Korean film
- Waru (悪女), Japanese manga

== See also ==
- Bad Bitch (disambiguation)
- Bad Woman
- Bad Girl (disambiguation)
- Bad Girls (disambiguation)
- Evil Woman (disambiguation)
