= Purin =

Purin may refer to:

- Purin (pudding), Japanese name for crème caramel or custard pudding
- Purin (Sanrio), or Pudding Dog, a character marketed by Sanrio, creators of Hello Kitty
- Fon Purin, or Pudding Fong, a character in the anime Tokyo Mew Mew
- Alexei Purin (born 1955), Russian poet and critic
- Purin, Japanese name for Jigglypuff, a Pokémon character

== See also ==
- Purina (disambiguation)
- Purine, an organic compound
- Purim, a Jewish holiday
