= Bad Company (disambiguation) =

Bad Company were a British rock music band formed in 1973.

- Bad Company (album), a 1974 album by Bad Company
- "Bad Company" (song), a 1974 song by Bad Company

Bad Company may also refer to:

== Film ==
- Bad Company (1925 film), an American drama by Edward H. Griffith
- Bad Company (1931 film), an American gangster film by Tay Garnett
- Bad Company (1946 film), a British drama by Paul Barrelet
- Bad Company (1963 film) or Les Mauvaises fréquentations, a film by Jean Eustache
- Bad Company (1972 film), an American Western by Robert Benton
- Bad Company, a 1980 Canadian film by Peter Vronsky
- Bad Company (1984 film) or The Bay Boy, a film by Daniel Petrie
- Bad Company (1986 film), an Argentine drama by José Santiso
- Bad Company (1995 film), an American neo-noir thriller by Damian Harris
- The Nature of the Beast or Bad Company, a 1995 film by Victor Salva
- Bad Company (1999 film), a French film by Jean-Pierre Améris
- Bad Company (2001 film) or Mabudachi, a Japanese film by Tomoyuki Furumaya
- Bad Company (2002 film), an American action-comedy directed by Joel Schumacher

== Television ==
- Bad Company (TV series), an Australian comedy series

== Literature ==
- Bad Company (comics), a 2000 AD comic strip first published in 1986
- Bad Company (manga), a 1997 Japanese manga (comic) by Tohru Fujisawa
- Bad Company, a 2003 thriller novel by Jack Higgins
- Bad Company, a 1914 book by Yuri Yurkun
- Bad Company, a 1982 book by Liza Cody

== Music ==
- Bad Company (drum and bass group) or Bad Company UK, an electronic music group formed in 1999
- Bad Company (soundtrack), a soundtrack album from the 2002 film
- "Bad Company" (ASAP Rocky song), 2018

== Wrestling promotions ==
- Badd Company, a tag team of Paul Diamond and Pat Tanaka that existed in several wrestling promotions from 1986 to 1994
- Bad Company, a tag team of Bruce Hart and Brian Pillman that existed in the Canadian Stampede Wrestling promotion from 1987 to 1989

== Video games ==
- Bad Company (video game), a 1990 video game
- Battlefield: Bad Company or Bad Company, a 2008 Electronic Arts video game

== See also ==
- Bad Guys (disambiguation)
- Bad company fallacy, a kind of logical fallacy
- Evil corporation
