= Chitra Iyer =

Indian Musician

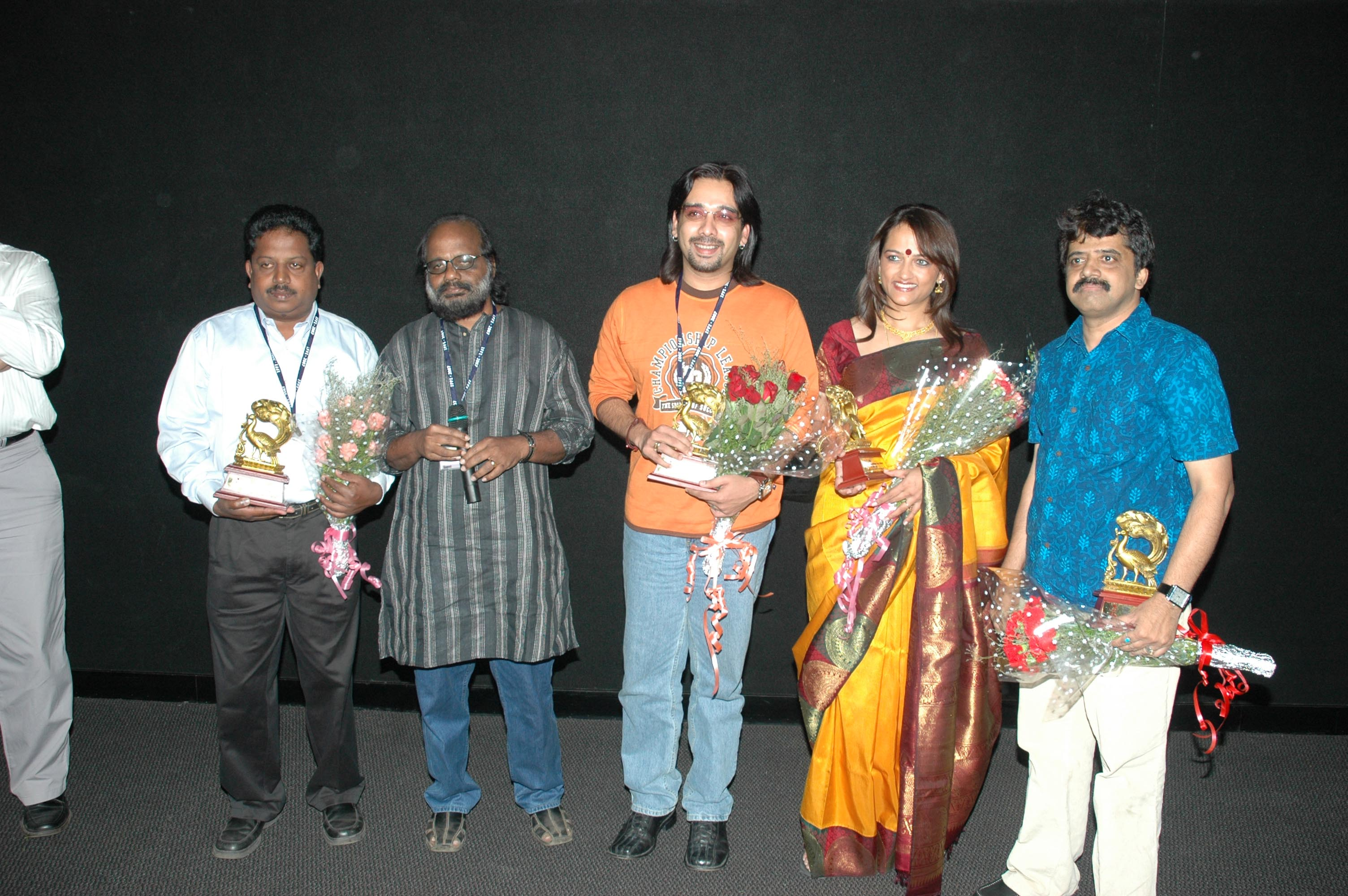

Background information
- Born: Karunagappally, Kerala, India
- Genre: Playback singing
- Occupations: Singer, television host, Actor
- Years active: 2000–present

Chitra Iyer (also credited as Chitra Sivaraman) is an Indian playback singer who has worked in Indian films across five different industries primarily in Malayalam.

A resident of Bangalore, Chitra worked extensively with A. R. Rahman during the early 2000s on his Tamil films, while also having an alternate career as a television host and actress on Malayalam television.

== Career ==
Early in her career, Chitra Iyer attempted to reach out to composer A. R. Rahman to work with him, but found it difficult as she was based out of Bangalore. In 2000, Rahman initiated contact with Chitra and invited her to come to Chennai with a demo cassette of her work, with Chitra recording a series of Tamil and Malayalam songs. On the day of her visit to Chennai, Rahman immediately heard the songs and hired her to record for the song "Athini Sithini" for the film Thenali (2000) during the same evening. She subsequently continued to work for other composers in Tamil cinema including Karthik Raja, Yuvan Shankar Raja, Bharadwaj and Vidyasagar under her post-marriage name of Chitra Sivaraman. Furthermore, apart from in her mother tongue of Tamil, Chitra continued to sing playback for Telugu, Kannada, Malayalam and Hindi films.

In the Malayalam entertainment industry, she had an alternate career as an anchor of a Malayalam singing show, Jeeva's Sapta Swarangal and hosted it under her maiden name, Chitra Iyer. Having done her education in Kerala, she had a good foundation in the Malayalam language, with her work on the show leading to further opportunities to sing for films.

== Personal life ==
Chitra Iyer is married to former Air Force pilot Vinod Sivaraman since 12 July 1989. The pair met at the insistence of their parents at Chennai Gymkhana Club in early 1989, and have since had two daughters Aditi Anjali, the latter known for her performance in the 2023 Netflix series Class.

In recent years, alongside her television commitments, Chitra has worked as the founder and trustee of the Society for Elephant Welfare in Kerala. She has also promoted farming with the state, supporting a project launched by her mother Rohini Iyer. Likewise, she launched a software company, Darkhorse Productions, in 2013 alongside her daughters Aditi and Anjali Sivaraman.

== Notable discography ==
Tamil

Year	Song title	Film	Music director	Notes
2000	"Athini Sithini"	Thenali	A. R. Rahman	
2001	"Athan Varuvaga"	Dumm Dumm Dumm	Karthik Raja	
2001	"Adi Nenthikkitten"	Star	A. R. Rahman	
2001	"Thozha Thozha"	Pandavar Bhoomi	Bharadwaj	
2001	"Colour Colour"	Manadhai Thirudivittai	Yuvan Shankar Raja	
2001	"Panjaangam Paarakadhe"	Thavasi	Vidyasagar	
2002	"Neruppu Koothadikudhu"	Thulluvadho Ilamai	Yuvan Shankar Raja	
2002	"Dhuan Dhuan Sa"	16 December	Karthik Raja	
2003	"Vasiyakaara"	Pudhiya Geethai	Yuvan Shankar Raja	
2003	"Ale Ale"	Boys	A. R. Rahman	
2003	"Asathura"	Enakku 20 Unakku 18	A. R. Rahman	
2004	"Anarkali"	Kangalal Kaidhu Sei	A. R. Rahman	
2004	"Bommalattam"	Bose	Yuvan Shankar Raja	

Malayalam

Year	Song title	Film	Music director
1996	Kunjikattin	Naalamkettile Nalla Thampimar	SP Venkatesh
1998	Aadharam Madhuram	Gramapanchayath	Berny Ignatius
1998	Thankamani Tharamay	Kudumba Varthakkal	Berny Ignatius
2001	Kalakalam Padum	Korappam the Great	Balabhaskar
2002	Raavinte Devahridayam	Mazhathullikilukkam	Suresh Peters
2002	Kaatoram Kadaloram	Sisiram	Berny Ignatius
2002	Pakkala	Sisiram	Berny Ignatius
2003	Ishtamallada	Swapnakoodu	Mohan Sithara
2003	Chundatu chettipoo	Chronic Bachelor	Deepak Dev
2003	Nalkani Aayalo	Ottakambi Nadam	Ramesh Narayan
2003	Oru Swapnam	Ottakambi Nadam	Ramesh Narayan
2004	Valentine Valentine	Youth Festival	M. Jayachandran
2004	Maatupetti	Mayilattam	M. Jayachandran
2004	Paalathil Thallithali	Udayam	Mohan Sithara
2004	Rithame	Udayam	Mohan Sithara
2005	Oru Swapnam	December	Jassie Gift
2005	Kadamthadi	December	Jassie Gift
2006	Kusumavadana	Madhuchandralekha	M. Jayachandran
2006	Kaadukulirana	Bada Dosth	M. Jayachandran
2007	Sneham Kondoru	Sooryakireedam	Bennet
2007	Sneham Kondoru (slow)	Sooryakireedam	Bennet
2011	Maanmizhi	Metro	Shaan Rahman
2011	Maanmizhi (Remix)	Metro	Shaan Rahman
2013	Hey Ethuvazhi	Arikil Oraal	Gopi Sundar

== Television ==
- Sapthaswarangal (Asianet) as Host
- Idea Star singer 2006 (Asianet) as Judge
- Voice of Kerala (Surya TV) as Judge
- Sangeetha Mahayudham (Surya TV) as Team Captain
- Malayalee House (Surya TV) as Contestant
- Super Star Global (Amrita TV) as Judge
- Flowers Oru Kodi (Flowers TV) as Contestant

Other TV Shows as guest

- JB Junction
- Onnum Onnum Moonu
- Symphony
- Ente Daivam
- Tharapakittu
- Annonyam
- Tarang
- Thara Dambathimarude Samsthana Sammelanam

She has also performed in a few Mauritius Television shows as Performer

TV serials - Malayalam

Year	Title	Channel	Role	Notes
2002	Venalmazha	Surya TV	—N/a	Singer - Thalirayi song
2013	Kumkumapoovu	Asianet	Arundathi Jithan's friend	Super hit
2015-2016	Eeran Nilavu	Flowers (TV channel)	Vidyabharathi	
2018–2019	Gauri	Surya TV	Yamini	

== Filmography ==
- 2005 - Athira X C (Malayalam) - telefilm
- 2007 - Rathri Mazha (Malayalam) as Mohini Natyamandir
- 2009 - Makante Achan (Malayalam) as herself
- 2010 - Kaaryasthan (Malayalam) as herself
- 2011 - Makaramanju (Malayalam) as Rukku Bai
- 2012 - Casanovva (Malayalam) as Salsa Teacher
- 2012 - Unnam (Malayalam) as Padma
- 2012 - Arike (Malayalam) as Kalpan's chitta
- 2018 - B.Tech (Malayalam) as Priya's mother
- 2021 - Mohan Kumar Fans as herself
- 2022 - Jana Gana Mana as Swetha Gupta
- 2022 - Meri Awas Suno as Prof. Renuka Varma
- 2024 - Manorathangal as Tamil lady - Anthology series; Segment : Vilpana
