= Bad Girl =

Bad Girl may refer to:

== Film ==
- Bad Girl (1931 film), an American drama directed by Frank Borzage
- Bad Girl (1963 film), a Japanese drama
- Bad Girl (1992 film), a British television film by Guy Hibbert in the anthology series ScreenPlay
- Bad Girl (2012 film), a French drama
- Bad Girl (2016 film), an Australian thriller
- Bad Girl (2025 film), an Indian Tamil-language coming-of-age drama

== Literature ==
- The Bad Girl, a 2006 novel by Mario Vargas Llosa
- Bad Girl (manga), a 2021 Japanese manga series by Nikumaru

== Music ==
=== Albums ===
- Bad Girl (album), by La Toya Jackson, or the title song (see below), 1989
- Bad Girl (soundtrack), from the 2025 film
- Bad Girl, by Anita Mui, or the title song, 1985
- Bad Girl, by Carlos Toshiki & Omega Tribe, 1989
- Bad Girl, by Cherry Vanilla, 1978

=== Songs ===
- "Bad Girl" (Avril Lavigne song), 2013
- "Bad Girl" (Beast song), 2009
- "Bad Girl" (Confessions of a Shopaholic song), by Rihanna and Chris Brown, and by the Pussycat Dolls, 2009
- "Bad Girl" (Danity Kane song), 2008
- "Bad Girl" (Fugative song), 2010
- "Bad Girl" (La Toya Jackson song), 1989
- "Bad Girl" (Madonna song), 1993
- "Bad Girl" (Massari song), 2009
- "Bad Girl" (Meisa Kuroki song), 2009
- "Bad Girl" (The Miracles song), 1959
- "Bad Girl" (Monifah song), 1999
- "Bad Girl" (The Zakary Thaks song), 1966
- "Bad Girl (At Night)", by Dave Spoon featuring Lisa Maffia, 2007
- "Bad Girl", by A Boogie wit da Hoodie from The Bigger Artist, 2017
- "Bad Girl", by Black Buddafly and Fabolous from the Waist Deep film soundtrack, 2006
- "Bad Girl", by Daya, 2021
- "Bad Girl", by the Featherz, 2015
- "Bad Girl", by Girls' Generation from Girls' Generation, 2011
- "Bad Girl", by Judd Hoos representing South Dakota in the American Song Contest, 2022
- "Bad Girl", by Ladies' Code from Code 01 Bad Girl, 2013
- "Bad Girl", by Lee Moses, 1967
- "Bad Girl", by Miyuki Nakajima from Kansuigyo, 1982
- "Bad Girl", by Neil Sedaka, 1963
- "Bad Girl", by New York Dolls from New York Dolls, 1973
- "Bad Girl", by Rainbow, B-side of the single "Since You Been Gone", 1979
- "Bad Girl", by Usher from Confessions, 2004
- "Bad Girl", by Wooah, 2020

== Other uses ==
- "Bad Girl" (Zoey 101), a 2005 television episode
- Bad Girl, a character in the video game No More Heroes

== See also ==
- Bad girl art, a superheroine art form genre
- Bad girl clause, a provision within a contract which proscribes certain behavior
- Bad Girls (disambiguation)
- Bad Bitch (disambiguation)
- Bad Boy (disambiguation)
- Bad Guy (disambiguation)
