= Bad Girl (soundtrack) =

Soundtrack album by Amit Trivedi
- Released: 8 August 2025
- Recorded: 2025
- Studio: A T Studios, Mumbai
- Genre: Feature film soundtrack
- Length: 19:17
- Label: Sony Music India
- Producer: Amit Trivedi

Amit Trivedi chronology
Kaalidhar Laapata (2025)	Bad Girl (2025)

Singles from Bad Girl
- 1. "Please Yenna Appadi Paakadhey" Released: 28 March 2025; 2. "Naan Thani Pizhai" Released: 18 July 2025

Bad Girl is the soundtrack album composed by Amit Trivedi to the 2025 coming-of-age drama film of the same name directed by Varsha Bharath, produced by Vetrimaaran's Grass Root Film Company and presented by Anurag Kashyap, starring Anjali Sivaraman. The film marked Trivedi's Tamil debut as a music director, and features seven songs with lyrics written by Kaber Vasuki, Krithika Nelson, Sublahshini, Vivek, Ranjani Ramadoss and Bharath herself.

== Background and development ==
Amit Trivedi composed the film score and soundtrack in his Tamil debut as a music director. Initially, while writing the film, Bharath did not have plans to include songs in the film and the music director was not finalized until then. She had a compilation of music as a playlist that had been used as a temp. However, when Kashyap watched the film, he thought it as a musical and insisted on Trivedi's involvement. Trivedi previously shared a working relationship with Kashyap ever since the former's film debut Aamir (2008), where Kashyap served as a producer.

Bharath added that Trivedi's involvement provided the film a different vibe and the music worked well. She described the album where each song is not a hit material, but also being extremely soulful. Most of the songs were accompanied by female singers; except for one song by the composer himself, the rest of the songs were performed by Mali, Dimple Saikia, Sublahshini, Shivani Panneerselvam, Sharanya Gopinath, Vaikom Vijayalakshmi, Ranjani Ramadoss and the lead actress Anjali Sivaraman herself. The music also accompanies a range of genres from pop, rock, jazz and melodies.

== Release ==
The film's first single "Please Yenna Appadi Paakadhey" was earlier scheduled to release on 26 March 2025, but was postponed as a mark of respect to Manoj Bharathiraja's demise. The song was eventually released two days later. The second single "Naan Thani Pizhai" was released on 18 July. The film's soundtrack album was released through Sony Music India on 8 August.

== Track listing ==
No.	Title	Lyrics	Singer(s)	Length
1.	"Please Yenna Appadi Paakadhey"	Kaber Vasuki	Mali	3:00
2.	"Home"	Varsha Bharath	Anjali Sivaraman	1:43
3.	"Naan Thani Pizhai"	Krithika Nelson	Amit Trivedi, Dimple Saikia	3:14
4.	"Kalli Kaattil"	Krithika Nelson	Shivani Panneerselvam	3:04
5.	"Unnil Kaadhal Kaana"	Sublahshini	Sublahshini, Shivani Panneerselvam, Sharanya Gopinath	3:23
6.	"Aariraro"	Vivek	Vaikom Vijayalakshmi	2:21
7.	"Home" (Reprise)	Varsha Bharath, Ranjani Ramadoss	Ranjani Ramadoss	2:30
Total length:				19:17

== Reception ==
Nandini Ramnath of Scroll.in wrote "Amit Trivedi's lovely songs accompany the lurchings of Ramya's heart." Rajasekar S of The Federal wrote "Amit Trivedi's music beautifully complements the coming-of-age theme, with a soundtrack that captures the emotional ebbs and flows of Ramya's journey." Sanjana Ganesh of The Hindu described the music "catchy". Bharathy Singaravel of The News Minute wrote "Amit Trivedi's lilting 'Home' underscores these struggles. It's a tender song that speaks of a need to belong somewhere safe. 'Unnil kaadhal kaana' and 'Please yenna appadi paakadhey' are a refreshing change from the high-decibel, almost indistinguishable soundtracks of recent hit movies." Ashwin S of Cinema Express complimented the use of female singers and a multitude of genres.

== Personnel ==
Credits adapted from Sony Music South:

- Music composer, producer, arranger: Amit Trivedi
- Recording, mixing and mastering: Chinmay Mestry (A T Studios, Mumbai)
- Assistant sound engineer: Abhishek Vishnu Dandekar, Prasad Maha, Jazbaat
- Guitars: John Paul, I D Rao, Keba Jeremiah
- Strings and strokes: Tapas Roy
- Studio manager: Naveen
