= Bad Girls Club (disambiguation) =

Bad Girls Club is an American reality television series.

Bad Girls Club may also refer to:

- Bad Girls Club (album), 2010 album by Kimberly Cole
- "Bad Girls Club" (song), a song by Jeanette from the 2006 album Naked Truth
- "Bad Girls Club", 2011 single by Wale

== See also ==
- Bad Girl (disambiguation)
- Bad Girls (disambiguation)
- List of Bad Girls Club episodes
