= Stray Dog Café =

Historic café in St Petersburg, Russia

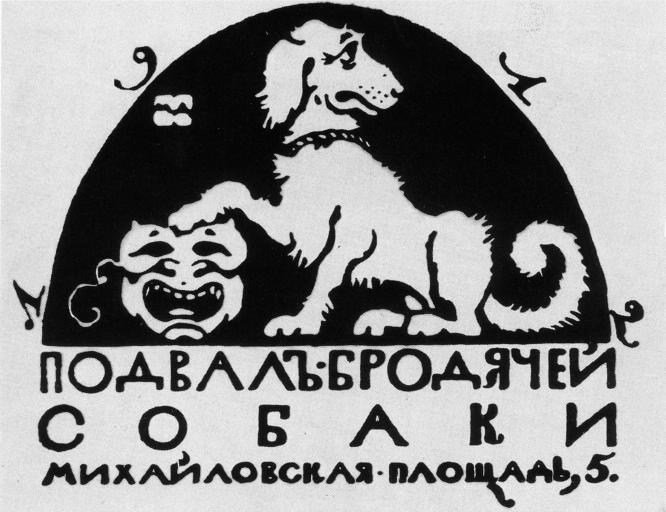
Stray dog logo 1912

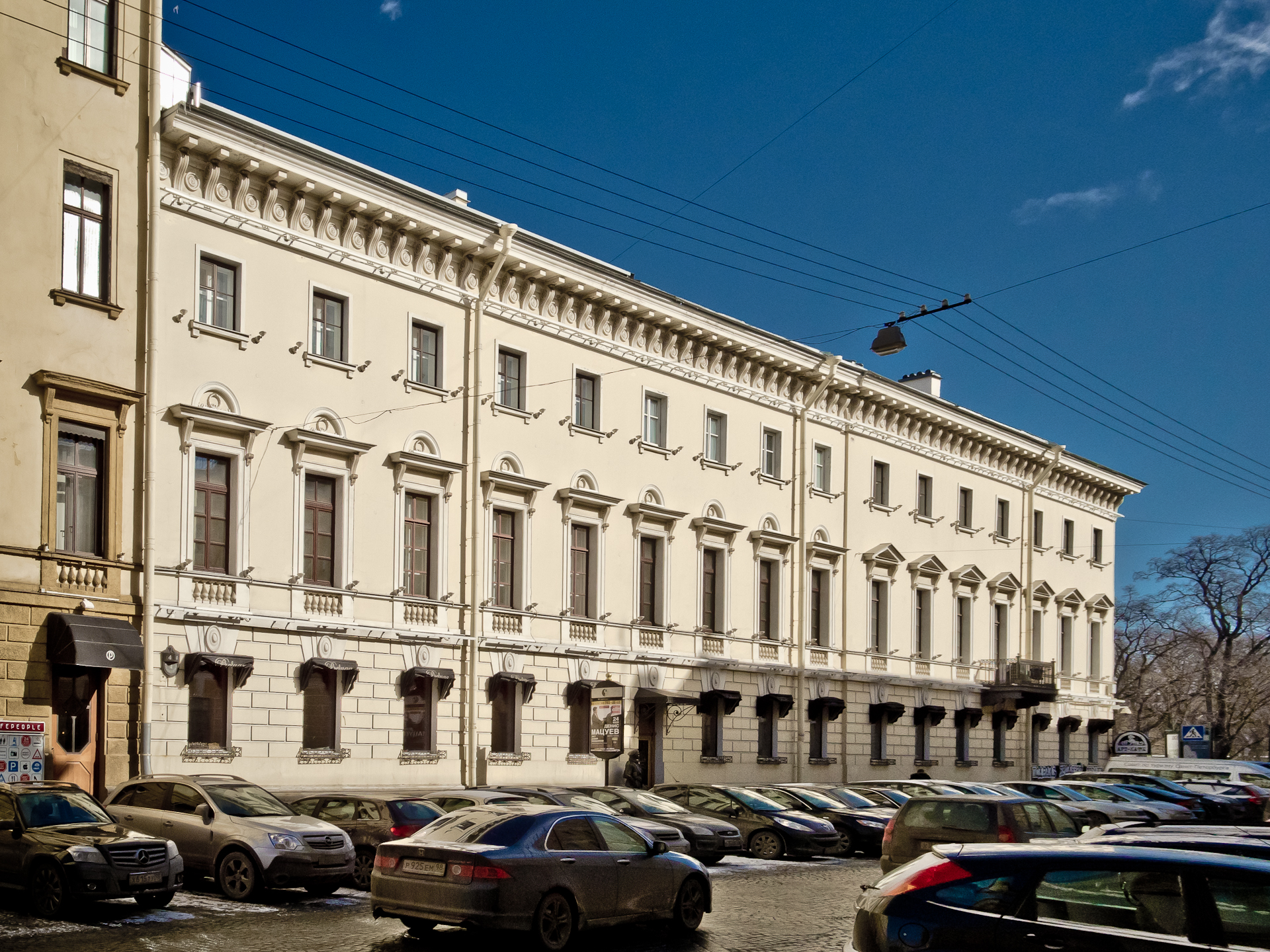
Italianskaya St.

The Stray Dog (Russian: Бродя́чая соба́ка, also known as the Stray Dog Cellar, Stray Dog Cabaret and the Society for Intimate Theatre) was a café and cabaret located at Mikhailovskaya Ploshchad, 5 (Ploshchad Isskustv), Square of the Arts up to Summer Gardens, St. Petersburg, Russia. Theatrical performances, lectures, poetry and musical evenings were held here.

The Stray Dog Café was a meeting place for writers and poets between 1911 and 1915. The Acmeist poets (Nikolay Gumilyov, Mandelstam, Mikhail Kuzmin, etc.) gathered there to discuss theories of literature, give poetry readings, and perform theatre. They considered themselves "'stray dogs' shunted aside by proper aristocratic society", which led to the name. The cafe was in disrepair for many years and reopened in 2001.

Run by proprietor Boris Pronin, out of the cellar of the Dashkov mansion, it opened New Year's Eve, 1911 and was shut down by the authorities in 1915. Its closing was linked to the start of World War I. A key locale for the followers of the emerging acmeist and futurist literary movements, the Stray Dog clientele rejected the symbolist school of thought.

The previous salon for St. Petersburg poets had been the Tower. This was the apartment of the symbolist poet Vyacheslav Ivanov, who also influenced Vsevolod Meyerhold's use of theatre. Many of these poets later became patrons of the Stray Dog.

Poets/performers at the Stray Dog Café included Anna Akhmatova, her husband Nikolay Gumilyov, Velimir Khlebnikov, Vladimir Mayakovsky, Marina Tsvetaeva, Boris Pasternak, Sergei Esenin, Mikhail Kuzmin, Osip Mandelstam, Nikolay Barabanov etc.
