= Mikhail Kuzmin =

Russian poet, musician and novelist

- Михаил Кузмин
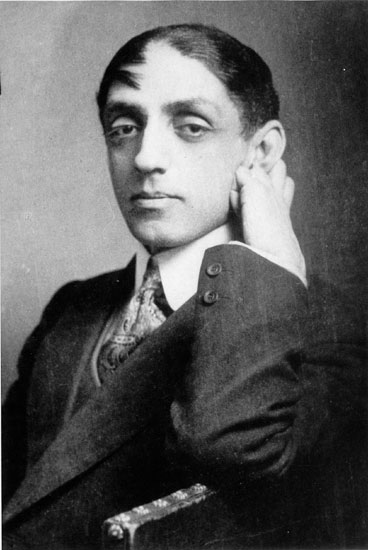
- Kuzmin in c. 1911
- Born: 18 October [O.S. 6 October] 1872; Yaroslavl, Russian Empire
- Died: March 1, 1936 (aged 63); Leningrad, Russian SFSR, USSR
- Education: Imperial Moscow University (1903)
- Writing career
- Notable work: Wings

Mikhail Alekseevich Kuzmin (Russian: Михаи́л Алексе́евич Кузми́н) (18 October [O.S. 6 October] 1872 – March 1, 1936) was a Russian poet, musician and novelist, as well as a prominent contributor to the Silver Age of Russian Poetry.

== Biography ==
Born into a noble family in Yaroslavl, Kuzmin grew up in St. Petersburg and studied music at the Saint Petersburg Conservatory under Nikolai Rimsky-Korsakov. He did not graduate, however, later explaining his move towards poetry thus: "It's easier and simpler. Poetry falls ready-made from the sky, like manna into the mouths of the Israelites in the desert." Despite this Kuzmin did not give up music; he composed the music for Meyerhold's famous 1906 production of Alexander Blok's play Balaganchik (The Fair Show Booth), and his songs were popular among the Petersburg elite: "He sang them, accompanying himself on the piano, first in various salons, including Ivanov's Tower, and then at The Stray Dog. Kuzmin liked to say of his work that 'it's only little music, but it has its poison.'"

One of his closest friends and major influences as a young man was the polyglot Germanophile aristocrat Georgy Chicherin (who later entered the diplomatic service and after the October Revolution became People's Commissar of Foreign Affairs), a passionate supporter of Wagner and Nietzsche. Another strong influence was his travels, first to Egypt and Italy and then to northern Russia, where he was deeply impressed by the Old Believers. Settling down in St. Petersburg, he became close to the circle around Mir iskusstva (World of Art). His first published writings appeared in 1905 and attracted the attention of Valery Bryusov, who invited him to contribute to his influential literary magazine Vesy (The Balance), the center of the Symbolist movement, where in 1906 he published his verse cycle "Alexandrian Songs" (modeled on Les Chansons de Bilitis, by Pierre Louÿs) and the first Russian novel with a homosexual theme, Wings, which instantly achieved notoriety and made him a widely popular writer. In 1908 appeared his first collection of poetry, Seti (Nets), which was also widely acclaimed. In the words of Roberta Reeder, "His poetry is erudite and the themes range from Ancient Greece and Alexandria to modern-day Petersburg."

In 1908 he was living with Sergei Sudeikin and his first wife Olga Glebova, whom he had married just the year before; when Olga discovered her husband was having an affair with Kuzmin she insisted Kuzmin move out. "But in spite of this contretemps, Kuzmin, Sudeikin, and Glebova continued to maintain a productive, professional relationship, collaborating on many ventures—plays, musical evenings, poetry declamations—especially at the St. Petersburg cabarets." Kuzmin was also one of the favorite poets of Sudeikin's second wife, Vera, and her published album contains several of his manuscript poems.

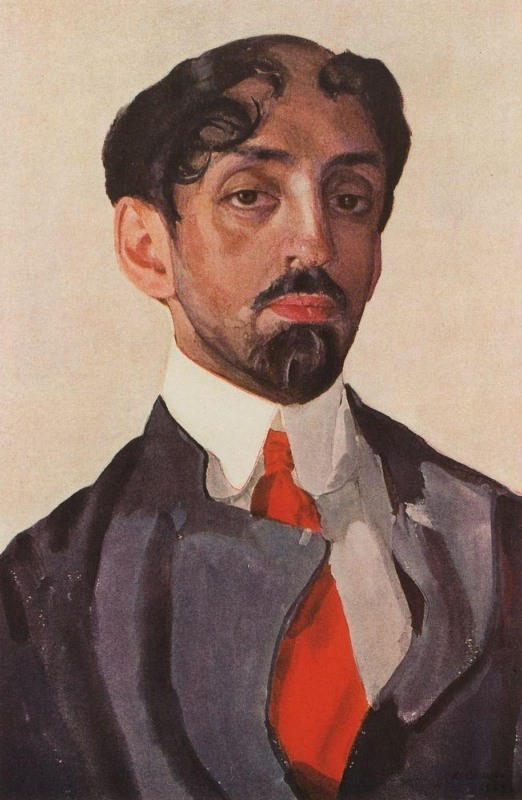
Portrait by Konstantin Somov (1909).

Kuzmin met Yuri Yurkun, a poet, in 1913. The two men lived together with Yurkun's mother, and Yurkun's wife, Olga Arbenina, joined them, for a short while. Kuzmin and Yurkun's relationship lasted until Kuzmin's death. Kuzmin died in 1936 of pneumonia, two years before Yurkun and many other writers were arrested by Soviet authorities and shot.

Kuzmin's association with the Symbolists was never definitive, and in 1910 he helped give rise to the Acmeist movement with his essay "O prekrasnoi yasnosti" (On beautiful clarity), in which he attacked "incomprehensible, dark cosmic trappings" and urged writers to be "logical in the conception, the construction of the work, the syntax... love the word, like Flaubert, be economical in means and niggardly in words, precise and genuine -- and you will find the secret of an amazing thing — beautiful clarity — which I would call clarism." He was no more a member of the group than he had been of the Symbolists, but he was personally associated with a number of them; in the years 1910-12 he lived in the famous apartment (called the Tower) of Vyacheslav Ivanov, who was another formative influence on the Acmeists, and he was a friend of Anna Akhmatova, for whose first book of poetry, Vecher [Evening], he wrote a flattering preface. (In later years Kuzmin incurred Akhmatova's enmity, probably because of a 1923 review she took as condescending, and she made him a prototype of one of the villains in her "Poem Without a Hero".)

The last volume of poetry Kuzmin published during his lifetime was The Trout Breaks the Ice (1929), a cycle of narrative poetry.

In the 1920s and 1930s Kuzmin made his living primarily as a literary translator, most notably of Shakespeare's plays. He died in poverty in Leningrad.

== Legacy ==
Contemporary poet and critic Alexei Purin thinks the openly "tragic," socially oriented tradition of Russian literature has been exhausted and it needed to reorient itself along the more personal and artistic tradition exemplified by Kuzmin and Vladimir Nabokov. He quotes Innokenty Annensky as saying it was important to avoid "the persistent embrace of the 'like everyone'" and writes: "It is precisely the poetry of Annensky and Kuzmin that at the beginning of the twentieth century took the first and decisive step away from this 'like everyone' — in the direction of psychologically interpreted details and the everyday word, in the direction of living intonation — a step to be compared, perhaps, only with the Pushkin revolution. All succeeding Russian lyric poetry is unimaginable without it."

Mandelstam, in his 1916 review "On Contemporary Poetry," wrote:

Kuzmin's classicism is captivating. How sweet it is to read a classical poet living in our midst, to experience a Goethean blend of "form" and "content," to be persuaded that the soul is not a substance made of metaphysical cotton, but rather the carefree, gentle Psyche. Kuzmin's poems not only lend themselves easily to memorization, but also to recall, as it were (the impression of recollection after the very first reading), and they float up to the surface as if out of oblivion (Classicism)...

And in his essay "A Letter about Russian Poetry" (1922), he said "Kuzmin brought dissident songs from the Volga shores, an Italian comedy from his own native Rome, and the entire history of European culture insofar as it had become music—from Giorgione's "Concert" at the Pitti Palace to the most recent tone poems of Debussy."

== Translations ==
- M. Kuzmin, 'New Hull', tr. Simona Schneider, Ugly Duckling Presse (2022)..
- Александрийские песни|Canções alexandrinas, Oleg Almeida (Trans.), (n.t.) Revista Literária em Tradução, nº 2 (mar/2011), Fpolis/Brasil, ISSN 2177-5141.
- Canções alexandrinas: Tradução, apresentação e notas explicativas de Oleg Almeida. Arte Brasil: São Paulo, 2011, 50 p. ISBN 978-85-64377-01-1.
- M. Kuzmin, Wings, tr. H. Aplin (2007).
- M. Kuzmin, 'The Venetian Madcaps', tr. M. Green, in Russian Literature Triquarterly; 7 (1973), p. 119-51.
- M. Kuzmin, Wings: prose and poetry, tr. N. Granoien, M. Green (1972).
- M. Kuzmin, Alexandrinische Gesange, tr. A. Eliasberg (1921).
