= Amri (film) =

- Directed by: Mira Nair
- Written by: Mira Nair; Clara Royer
- Produced by: Samudrika Arora; Michael Nozik; Mira Nair
- Starring: Anjali Sivaraman; Emily Watson; Jaideep Ahlawat; Krisztián Csákvári; Anjana Vasan; Jim Sarbh; Priyanka Chopra
- Production companies: Mirabai Films; Samscape Productions; Papertown Production
- Release date: 2027
- Country: United States
- Language: English

Amri is an upcoming American biographical drama film directed and produced by Mira Nair, and co-written by Clara Royer. It depicts the life of the Hungarian-Indian painter Amrita Sher-Gil. It stars Anjali Sivaraman, Emily Watson, Jaideep Ahlawat, Krisztián Csákvári, Anjana Vasan, Jim Sarbh, and Priyanka Chopra.

== Premise ==
Follows the life of Hungarian-Indian painter Amrita Sher-Gil from 1915 to 1941, chronicling her journey across Hungary, India, and France.

== Cast ==
- Anjali Sivaraman as Amrita Sher-Gil
- Emily Watson as Marie Antoinette Gottesman
- Jaideep Ahlawat as Umrao Singh Sher-Gil
- Krisztián Csákvári as Victor Egan
- Anjana Vasan as Indira Sundaram
  - Lakshmi Janka Venkatesha as Young Indira Sundaram
- Jim Sarbh as Karl Jamshed Khandalavala
- Priyanka Chopra as Madame Azurie

== Production ==
In August 2020, filmmaker Mira Nair announced that she would be directing and co-writing a biographical drama film about the Hungarian-Indian painter Amrita Sher-Gil. In October 2025, Tanya Maniktala, who had starred in Nair's television series, A Suitable Boy, was cast to portray Amrita.

By May 2026, Maniktala had exited the project, with Anjali Sivaraman replacing her. Principal photography began in January 2026, in Amritsar, Hungary, and France, with Emily Watson, Jaideep Ahlawat, Krisztián Csákvári, Anjana Vasan, Jim Sarbh, and Priyanka Chopra rounding out the cast. Filming wrapped in May.

== Release ==
Amri is scheduled to be released in the United States in 2027.
