= Nikolay Barabanov =

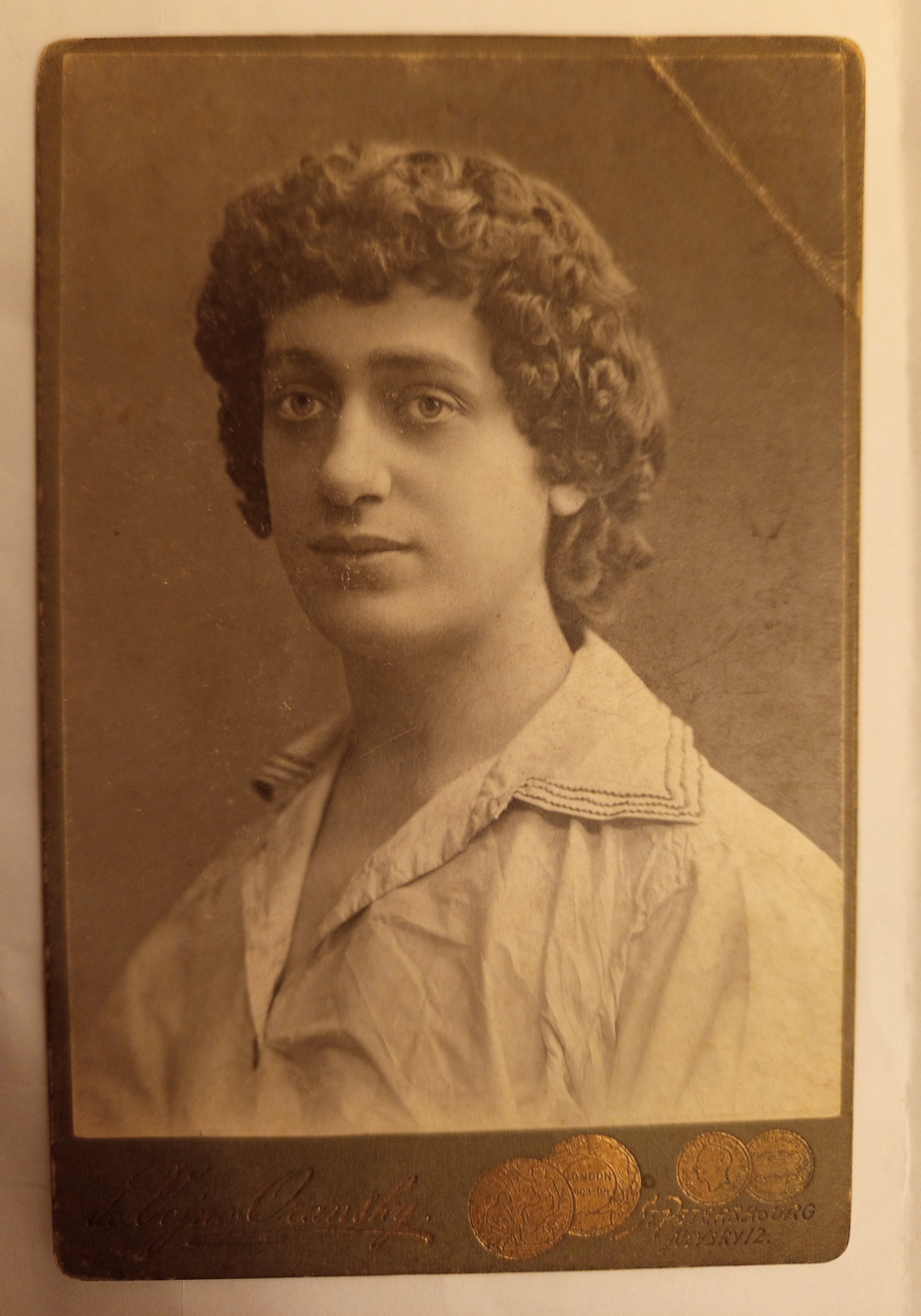
Portrait. Queer Museum in Exile

Nikolay Fyodorovich Barabanov (1880, Saint Petersburg, Russian Empire – 1975, Leningrad, USSR) was a Russian and Soviet variety artist and dancer in the travesty and parody genres. He spent the years 1917–1947 in forced exile, after which he returned to his homeland. Researchers consider Barabanov a pioneer of dance and variety parody and the world's first drag queen ballerina. Having successfully debuted on the stage of the St. Petersburg theater "Crooked Mirror", he subsequently performed at many famous venues in Europe: the St. Petersburg cabaret "Stray Dog Café", Berlin's Young Theater, Rome's Experimental Theater of Independent Anton Bragaglia, and the Paris Odéon-Théâtre de l'Europe. In the pre-revolutionary period, he was a screenwriter and starring actor in a number of silent films. He performed under the pseudonym Ikar, which he likely took from the same-sex love manifesto novella "Wings".

== Gallery ==
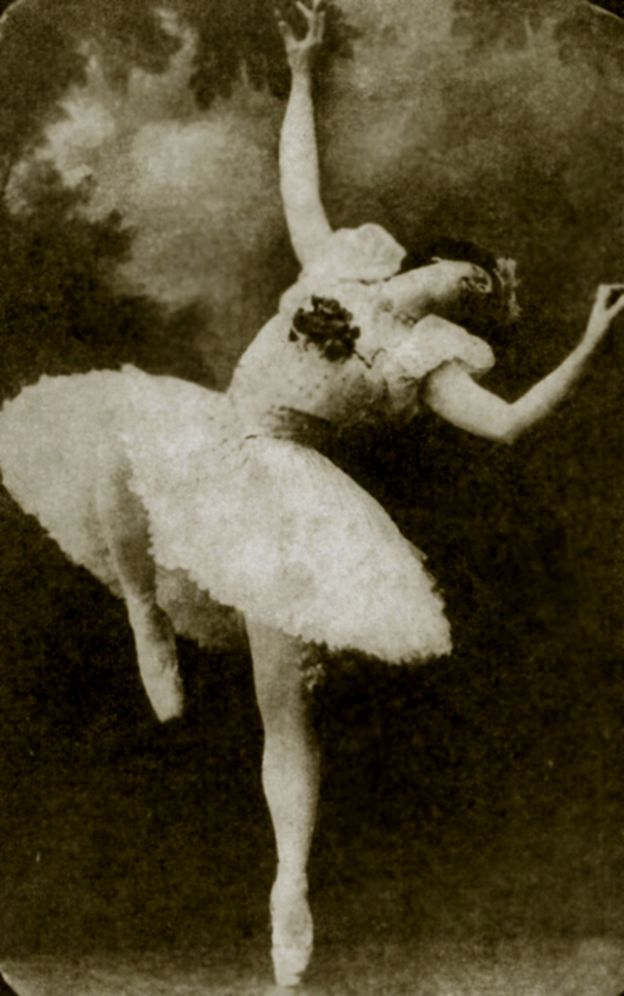

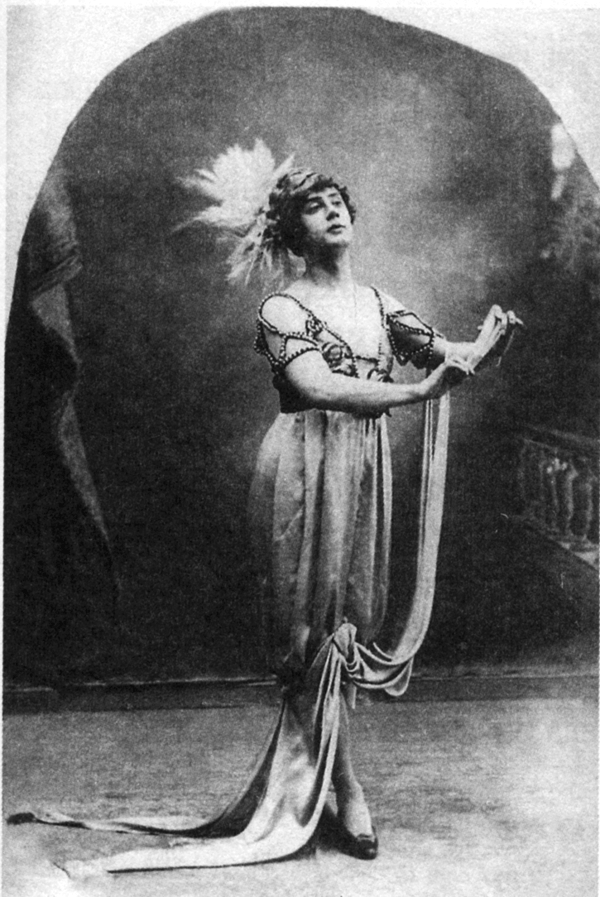

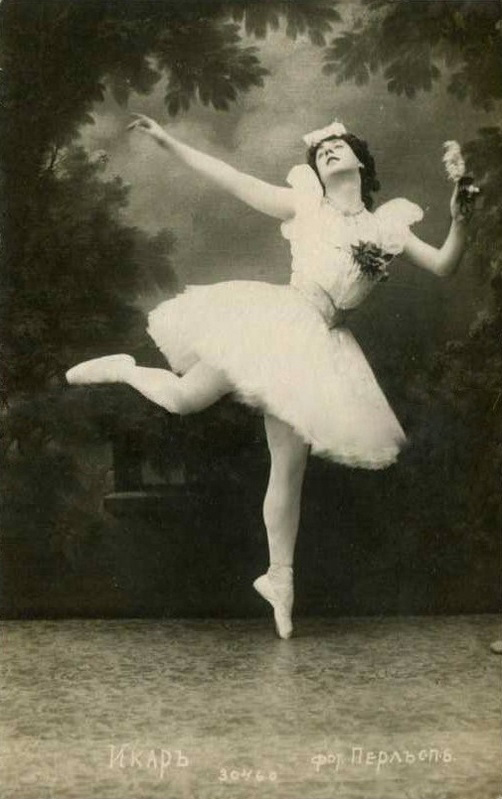

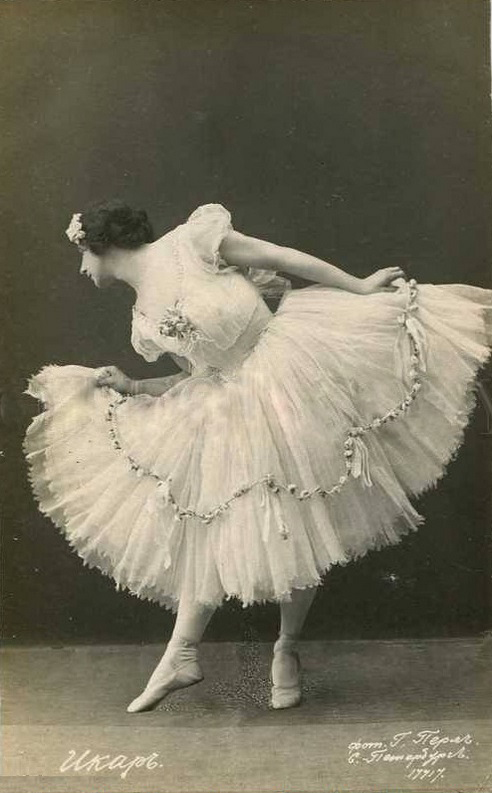

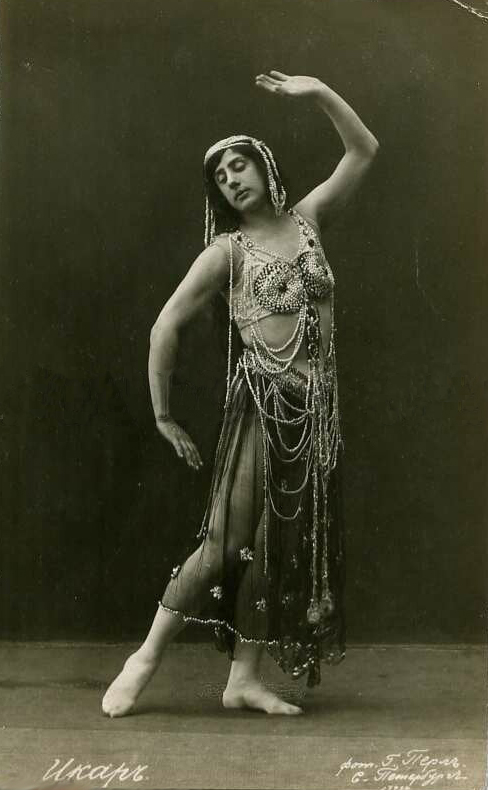
