= Bad Guy =

A bad guy or villain is a type of character in fiction and other narratives.

Bad Guy or Bad Guys or variation, may also refer to:

== Film ==
- Bad Guy (1937 film), a film starring Virginia Grey
- Bad Guys, a 1986 film starring Adam Baldwin
- Bad Guys, a 2000 film starring James Russo
- Bad Guy (2001 film), a South Korean film by Kim Ki-duk
- Bad Guys, a 2009 film distributed by Maya Entertainment
- The Bad Guys: Reign of Chaos, a 2019 South Korean crime film
- The Bad Guys (film), a 2022 animated film based on Aaron Blabey's graphic novel series of the same name
  - The Bad Guys: A Very Bad Holiday, a 2023 Christmas-themed prequel special based on the film and graphic novel series
  - The Bad Guys: Haunted Heist, a 2024 Halloween-themed prequel special based on the film and graphic novel series
  - The Bad Guys 2, a 2025 sequel to the 2022 film

== Television ==
- Bad Guy (TV series), a 2010 South Korean TV series
- Bad Guys (South Korean TV series), a 2014 South Korean TV series
- Bad Guys (Indonesian TV series), a 2025 Indonesian TV series
- The Bad Guy (TV series), a 2022 Italian crime drama television series
- "Bad Guys" (Stargate SG-1), a 2007 episode of the science fiction series
- "The Bad Guy" (Wander Over Yonder), a 2013 episode of the animated series
- The Bad Guys: The Series, a 2025 prequel series based on Aaron Blabey's graphic novel series of the same name.

== Music ==
- Bad Guy (album), an album by South Korean pop and R&B singer Rain
- The Bad Guys (album), a 2003 jazz album by Roscoe Mitchell
- "Bad Guy" (Eminem song), 2013
- "Bad Guy" (Billie Eilish song), 2019
- "Bad Guy", from the Shining Time Station episode Bully for Mr. Conductor by Richard Bernstein

== Other uses ==
- Scott Hall (wrestler) (born 1958), professional wrestler nicknamed "The Bad Guy" when using the ring name Razor Ramon
- The Bad Guys (book series), a children's graphic novel series by Aaron Blabey
  - The Bad Guys (franchise), various media based on the book series
- Sonic the Hedgehog: Bad Guys, a miniseries spin-off of the IDW Publishing series Sonic the Hedgehog

== See also ==
- Bad Boy (disambiguation)
- Bad Company (disambiguation)
- Villain (disambiguation)
