= Bad Bitch (disambiguation) =

"Bad Bitch" is a 2014 song by French Montana.

Bad Bitch or Bad Bitches may also refer to:

- "Bad Bitch", a song by Bebe Rexha from her 2017 EP All Your Fault: Pt. 1
- "Bad Bitch", a song by Lil Boosie and Webbie from their 2004 album Gangsta Musik
- "Bad Bitch", a song by Lil Wyte and JellyRoll from their 2016 album No Filter 2
- "Bad Bitch", a song by Obie Trice from his 2003 album Cheers
- "Bad Bitch", a 2020 song by Peg Parnevik
- "Bad Bitch", a 2016 song by The SoapGirls
- "Bad Bitch", a song by Snoop Dogg from his 2006 mixtape Tha Blue Carpet Treatment Mixtape
- "Bad Bitch", a 2012 song by Trina
- "Bad Bitch (Remix)", a song by Webbie from the 2005 soundtrack Hustle & Flow
- "Bad Bitch 2", a song by Webbie from his 2013 album Savage Life 4
- "Bad Bitches", a 2021 song by Marshmello
- "Bad Bitches", a 2020 song by Qveen Herby

== See also ==
- Bad Girl (disambiguation)
- "Bitch Bad", a 2012 song by Lupe Fiasco
