= Michael Nozik =

American film producer

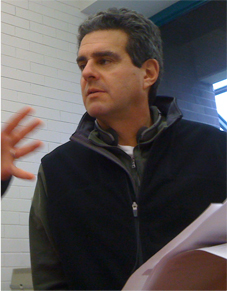
- Born: Michael Gary Nozik; Holyoke, Massachusetts, U.S.
- Occupation: Film producer
- Years active: 1981–present

Michael Nozik is an American film producer. He won a BAFTA award for The Motorcycle Diaries in the category of 'Best Film Not in the English Language' in 2004. His credits also include Love in the Time of Cholera, Syriana, Quiz Show, and The Legend of Bagger Vance.

== Filmography ==
He was a producer in all films unless otherwise noted.

=== Film ===
Year	Film	Credit	Award	Notes	Ref.
1987	China Girl				
1988	Salaam Bombay!	Executive producer			
1988	Crossing Delancey				
1991	Mississippi Masala				
1992	Thunderheart	Executive producer			
1994	Quiz Show		Academy Awards: Best Picture Nominee		
1995	The Perez Family				
1996	She's the One	Executive producer			
1998	No Looking Back				
1998	Slums of Beverly Hills				
2000	How to Kill Your Neighbor's Dog				
2000	The Legend of Bagger Vance				
2002	Love in the Time of Money	Executive producer			
2002	People I Know				
2004	The Motorcycle Diaries		BAFTA Award Winner: Best Film Not in the English Language		
2005	Game 6	Executive producer			
2005	The Great New Wonderful	Executive producer			
2005	12 and Holding	Executive producer			
2005	Syriana				
2007	Love in the Time of Cholera	Executive producer			
2008	The Narrows	Executive producer			
2010	The Next Three Days				
2013	Third Person				
2016	Gold				
2017	Lead and Copper	Executive producer		Documentary	
2027	Amri				

Production manager

Year	Film	Role
1983	Banzaï	Production manager: New York
1984	Old Enough	Production manager
1985	After Hours	Production manager
1987	Angel Heart	Unit production manager
1988	Crossing Delancey	Unit production manager

Location management

Year	Film	Role
1983	Baby It's You	Location manager
1984	Reckless	Location manager

Second unit director or assistant director

Year	Film	Role
1981	The Dozens	Second assistant director

Thanks

Year	Film	Role
2007	In the Valley of Elah	Special thanks

=== Television ===
Year	Title	Credit	Notes	Ref.
1985	Death of a Salesman	Associate producer	Television film	
1990	Criminal Justice		Television film	
2002	Skinwalkers	Executive producer	Television film	
2002	Skinwalkers: The Navajo Mysteries	Consulting producer Executive producer		
2003	A Thief of Time	Consulting producer	Television film	
2015	Show Me a Hero	Consulting producer		
TBA	The Transplant	Executive producer		

Production manager

Year	Title	Role	Notes
1985	Death of a Salesman	Production manager	Television film
1985	ABC Afterschool Special	Production manager	
1990	Criminal Justice	Unit production manager	Television film
