= Hathras – 16 Days =

2026 Indian true-crime documentary series

- Genre: True-crime; Investigative journalism; Documentary series
- Created by: Tanushree Pandey
- Directed by: Patrick Graham
- Starring
- Country of origin: India
- Original language: Hindi
- No. of seasons: 1
- No. of episodes: 3

Production
- Production company: DocuBay

Original release
- Release: May 15, 2026

Hathras – 16 Days is a 2026 Indian Hindi-language documentary television series directed by Patrick Graham and produced by Tanushree Pandey, an investigative journalist and documentary filmmaker known for her reporting on human rights, conflict, and social justice issues released on 15 May 2026. The series is based on the 2020 Hathras case in Uttar Pradesh..

== Premise ==
Set over a period of 16 days, the series covers the investigation into the Hathras case and the reactions that followed across Uttar Pradesh and the national media. It also looks at the role played by journalists, local officials and the victim's family during the controversy.

== Cast ==
- Anjali Sivaraman as journalist
- Pavail Gulati as a television producer
- Kumud Mishra as a senior government official

== Critical reception ==
The series received mixed reviews from critics.

A review by The Times of India gave the series 3 out of 5 stars, stating "While the series does uncover the many layers of caste, gender, authority, and narrative control, one only wishes it had a more layered execution — one that went deeper into the lives and emotions of the people most impacted by this horrific crime".

M9 News described the series as a difficult but important watch and highlighted its focus on the victim's family and the wider public response to the case.
