= PM Selfiewallie =

- Created by: Ekta Kapoor
- Developed by: Ekta Kapoor
- Screenplay by: Neeraj Udhwani; Dialogues; Ishita Moitra
- Directed by: Ashima Chibber
- Creative director: Shivangi Babbar
- Opening theme: Bhavik Vyas
- Composer: Raju Singh
- Country of origin: India
- Original languages: Hindi; English
- No. of seasons: 1
- No. of episodes: 7

Production
- Executive producer: Chetan Jhawar (ALT)
- Producers: Ekta Kapoor; Shobha Kapoor
- Production location: Mumbai
- Editor: Antara Lahiri
- Camera setup: Multi-camera
- Running time: 18-28 minutes
- Production company: Balaji Telefilms

Original release
- Network: ALT Balaji
- Release: 18 April 2018

PM Selfiewallie is a 2018 Hindi web series, created by Ekta Kapoor for her video on demand platform ALTBalaji. The web series is about an NRI fashionista who accidentally becomes the PM of India.

The series is available for streaming on the ALT Balaji App and its associated websites since its release date.

== Plot ==
The series revolves around Tanya Thakur (Nityaami Shirke) who is born and raised in London. Tanya is a popular NRI Fashion blogger whose first ever visit turns into a crazy adventure when she gets kidnapped. Later she learns that she is supposed to be the youngest Prime Minister of the largest democracy of the world. The show explores whether Tanya could take the massive responsibilities to lead the country to greatness or whether she fails.

== Cast ==
- Nityaami Shirke as Tanya Thakur
- Seema Banerjee as Priyamvada Thakur
- Ramakant Dayama as Ashok
- Pranay Panchauri as Sachin Ghatge
- Anjali Sivaraman as Meera
- Paras Zuteh as Ricky
- Shanna Groverr as Riyaaz
- Adithi Kalkunte as Aruna
- Sandeep as Arnab Oswami (based on Arnab Goswami)
- Nazneen Madan as Amrita Bansal
- Alad Hussein as Subramanium Swamy (based on Subramanian Swamy)
- Deepak Kriplani as Prasad
- Pradeep Chaudhary as Patel
- Archana Patel as Mrs. Treasurewala
- Debashish Mitra as Godang Garam
- Rajeev Singh as Sarpanch
- Bobby Parvez as Pakistan PM
- Harish as Sri Lankan PM
- Samay Thakkar as Bangladesh PM
- Baldev Trehan as President
- Kadam Mehta as Swamy
- Mona Mathew as Female News Reporter
- Pravesh as Male News Reporter

== List of episodes ==
- Episode 1: And The Job of a Lifetime...
- Episode 2: And The Best Selfie Ever...
- Episode 3: And Love Thy Neighbor...
- Episode 4: And Force The Neighbor to Love You...
- Episode 5: And Its Time to Create History...
- Episode 6: And The Coming Out Party...
- Episode 7: Season Finale: And The High Hook-Up...
