= Bad Boys =

Bad Boys may refer to:

== Film ==
- Bad Boys (1961 film), a Japanese film by Susumu Hani
- Bad Boys (1983 film), an American crime drama starring Sean Penn
- Bad Boys (franchise), the American action-comedy series starring Will Smith and Martin Lawrence, it consists of:
  - Bad Boys (1995 film), an American action film
  - Bad Boys II, a 2003 sequel to the 1995 film
  - Bad Boys for Life, a 2020 sequel to the 2003 film
  - Bad Boys: Ride or Die, a 2024 sequel to the 2020 film
  - Bad Boys (soundtrack), a soundtrack album from the 1995 film
  - Bad Boys: Miami Takedown, a 2004 video game based on the sequel
- Bad Boys (2003 film), a Finnish crime drama starring Peter Franzén
- Bad Boys, a 2003 Indian Hindi film starring Rakhi Sawant

== Television ==
- Bad Boyes, a 1980s British children's television series
- "Bad Boys" (The IT Crowd), a 2010 episode of series 4 of The IT Crowd
- Bad Boys (British TV series), 1990s British comedy-drama television series with Steven Hartley
- Bad Boys (TV series), 2020s American reality television series

== Music ==
=== Albums ===
- Bad Boys (Baccara album), or the title song, 1981
- Bad Boys (DeBarge album), 1987
- Bad Boys (Haywire album), 1986

=== Songs ===
- "Bad Boys" (Alexandra Burke song), 2009
- "Bad Boys" (Inner Circle song), 1987, used as the theme song of the TV show Cops and in the 1995 film Bad Boys
- "Bad Boys" (Roxus song), 1991
- "Bad Boys" (Wham! song), 1983
- "Bad Boys" (Zara Larsson song), 2013
- "Bad Boys", a song by Shyne from Shyne
- "Bad Boys", a song by English band Whitesnake from Whitesnake
- "Bad Boys", a song by singer Victoria Justice from Victorious 3.0
- "Bad Boys", a song by Geetha Madhuri and Priya Himesh from Businessman
- "Bad Boys", a song by my fanmade singer Inzie from her album Emily (2012)
- "Bad Bad Boys", a song by Midi, Maxi & Efti

== Other uses ==
- Bad Boys (basketball), a nickname for the 1980-1994 Detroit Pistons of the NBA
- Bad Boys (manga), a manga series by Hiroshi Tanaka
- Bad Boys, a 1980 book by Sandra Cisneros
- Bad Boys, a Japanese owarai duo who host the variety show AKBingo!
- The Bad Boys (1960s rock group) or Flavor

== See also ==
- Bad Boys Inc, a British boy band
- Bad Boys Blue, a Germany-based pop band
- Bad Boy (disambiguation)
- Bad Girls (disambiguation)
