= Class (2023 TV series) =

Indian series

- Promotional poster
- Genre: Crime drama; Thriller
- Based on: Elite by Carlos Montero and Darío Madrona
- Screenplay by: Kersi Khambatta
- Story by: Ashim Ahluwalia; Bhaskar Hazarika; Indra Bisht; Kashyap Kapoor; Raghav Kakkar
- Directed by: Ashim Ahluwalia; Gul Dharmani; Kabir Mehta
- Starring: Anjali Sivaraman; Gurfateh Pirzada; Piyush Khati; Madhyama Segal; Cwaayal Singh; Zeyn Shaw; Chintan Rachchh; Ayesha Kanga; Moses Koul; Chayan Chopra; Naina Bhan
- Music by: Nayantara Bhatkal; Aditya N.; Tubby
- Country of origin: India
- Original language: Hindi
- No. of seasons: 1
- No. of episodes: 8

Production
- Executive producer: Ashim Ahluwalia
- Producers: Mautik Tolia; Persis Siganporia; Sukesh Motwani; Niharika Singh
- Cinematography: Alana Mejía González; Kyle Macfadzean; Michael Filocamo; Tapan Tushar Basu
- Editors: Deepa Bhatia; Utsav Bhagat
- Running time: 44 – 59 minutes
- Production companies: Bodhi Tree Multimedia; Future East Film

Original release
- Network: Netflix
- Release: 3 February 2023

Class is an Indian Hindi-language crime drama thriller television series adapted by Ashim Ahluwalia and based on the Spanish series Elite. It is set in Hampton International, a fictional elite high school in Delhi, and revolves around the relationships among three working-class students enrolled at the school and their wealthy classmates. The series was produced by Bodhi Tree Multimedia and Future East Film.

The series explores a wide range of social issues affecting modern youth, including casteism, child neglect, corruption, homophobia, religious discrimination, and income inequality in India. Class' 8 episodes were released on 3 February 2023 on Netflix. On 6 March 2023, Netflix confirmed that the series has been renewed for a second season. However, they later quietly cancelled the show by removing the "It’s Official: Another Season is Coming" label from the show's thumbnail on the website and app.

At the 2023 Filmfare OTT Awards, Class received 5 nominations, including Best Adapted Screenplay (Series) (Khambatta).

== Premise ==
After their local school is destroyed in a fire, three working-class friends – Dheeraj, Saba, and Balli – are offered scholarships to Hampton International, an elite private school in New Delhi. The scholarships are sponsored by the Ahuja Properties, who were at fault for the fire. At Hampton International, the three are initially ostracised by wealthy students. But as the school year progresses, their lives intertwine in a clash of lifestyles, resentments, envy, and sexual attraction.

== Cast ==
=== Main ===
- Anjali Sivaraman as Suhani Ahuja, Veer's sister and love interest of Neeraj and Dheeraj. Based on Marina from Elite. She comes from a wealthy family and has a streak of falling for the 'bad boy'. She rebels against the corrupted ways of her family while maintaining a youthful and joyful spirit.
- Gurfateh Pirzada as Neeraj "Neeru" Kumar Valmiki, Dheeraj's older brother who just got out of prison, who is also a love interest of Suhani. Based on Nano from Elite. He is vocal against prevalent casteism. His handsome and dangerous aura draws Suhani in. He struggles to pay a debt from prison and will do anything to get his hands on money. He is caring and sensitive to the people close to him. He often finds himself in trouble.
- Piyush Khati as Dheeraj Kumar Valmiki, one of three transfer students who falls for Suhani. Based on Samuel from Elite. A hardworking, shy, and tricky guy.
- Madhyama Segal as Saba Manzoor, one of three transfer students, a daughter of Kashmiri immigrants, who is Veer's love interest. Based on Nadia from Elite. She is academically driven and holds her religious and personal values close to her. She eventually faces discrimination and Islamophobia at school and is banned from wearing the hijab at school.
- Cwaayal Singh as Balram "Balli" Patwal, one of the three transfer students. He is immediately attracted to Koel. Based on Christian from Elite. A comical and carefree transfer student who tries to assimilate with the richer students.
- Zeyn Shaw as Veer Ahuja, brother of Suhani, and Yashika's boyfriend, who falls for Saba. Based on Guzmán from Elite. A hot-headed popular guy at school, he believes his way is always the right way. He is extremely protective of his sister and does not bond well with the transfer students.
- Chintan Rachchh as Faruq Manzoor, Saba's brother and a drug dealer who falls for Dhruv. Based on Omar from Elite. He is a closeted gay guy who struggles with pleasing his parents while living his true self. He dealt drugs to make enough money to move out. He is confident and detail-oriented.
- Ayesha Kanga as Yashika "Yash" Mehta, Veer's girlfriend who strives to be at the top. Based on Lu from Elite. She will go to extreme lengths to secure what she believes will bring her happiness even by manipulating people; however, she is aware that she will never be satisfied no matter how much she has. She has a strong dislike for Saba.
- Moses Koul as Sharan Gujral, Koel's longtime boyfriend. Based on Polo from Elite. He is submissive in nature and will follow the orders of the people he is close to. He is bisexual and extremely wealthy.
- Chayan Chopra as Dhruv Sanghvi, Faruq's love interest who is son of the Principal Vandana Sanghvi. Based on Ander from Elite.
- Naina Bhan as Koel Kalra, Sharan's longtime girlfriend and Balli's love interest. Based on Carla from Elite.

=== Recurring ===
- Chandan Anand as Suraj Ahuja
- Ritu Shivpuri as Garima Ahuja
- Kabir Sadanand as Tarun Kalra
- Suparana Krishna Moitra as Yamini Kalra
- Ratnabali Bhattacharjee as Vandana Sanghvi
- Ketan Singh as Deven Sanghvi
- Shahid Lateef as Yusuf Manzoor
- Neelofar Sheikh as Afroz Manzoor
- Vijay Srivastava as Bhagu Kumar Valmiki
- Reuben Israel as Ranjit Gujral
- Richista Gulati as Sulekha Gujral
- Aviral Gupta as Aryan Talwar
- Arshvir Wahi as Mikhail Bakshi
- Darshan Pandya as Inspector Bindya
- Vijay Dogra as Sub Inspector Satpal
- Neeraj Khetrapal as SK Chowdhary
- Rohit Khurana as Prannoy Das
- Rohit Singh as Manni
- D Jackson as Damru

== Episodes ==
No.	Directed by	Written by	Original release date
1	Kabir Mehta & Gul Dharmani	Kersi Khambatta	3 February 2023
Three working-class students, Dheeraj, Saba, and Balli, are transferred to Hampton International, a school for the children of Delhi's elites after their previous school mysteriously burned in a fire. The three are immediately mocked by the other students for their appearance and financial conditions. Dheeraj is specially picked on by Veer, whose father Suraj Ahuja owns a building company, called Ahuja Properties. Veer's sister Suhani develops a special liking for Dheeraj. Saba gets hateful comments due to the fact that she's Muslim and is barred from wearing her 'hijab' within the school premises by the principal. Balli is looked down upon by the other students due to his garrulous nature, but he befriends Dhruv, the principal's son, and helps in getting drugs through Faruq, a drug dealer who is also Saba's brother. Meanwhile, Neeraj, Dheeraj's brother, is released from prison after leading a protest against Ahuja Properties. At Hampton International, Saba catches Veer and Yashika having sex in the car. Yashika notices Saba and screams. The next day, all the students attend a party hosted by the Ahujas, where Yashika dares Veer to take Saba's virginity and record it. Dhruv drunkenly texts to meet Faruq, who quickly leaves after meeting with Dhruv. Koel seduces Balli and hooks up with him. Her boyfriend Sharan finds them but doesn't intervene. Meanwhile, Dheeraj dances with Suhani, who later has an argument with her parents about something that happened last year. In the present, Suhani is revealed to have been murdered in a parking lot and a police investigation is taking place.
2	Kabir Mehta & Gul Dharmani	Kersi Khambatta	3 February 2023
Suhani and Dheeraj work on a class project together. Veer, to Saba's annoyance at first, does not stop pursuing her. Against her wishes, he attempts to introduce himself to her devoutly Muslim parents, with slight consequences. Saba gradually lets her guard down with him. Neeraj reveals to Dheeraj that their father owes 15 lakh rupees from Chowdhary inmates from prisoners after they terrorize him. Neeraj asks Dheeraj to steal money from Suhani's house, but Dheeraj feels guilty. Koel convinces Sharan to have her way with Balli. In the present, it is revealed that Suhani was pregnant.
3	Kabir Mehta & Gul Dharmani	Kersi Khambatta	3 February 2023
To her annoyance, Yashika realizes that Saba has been selected for World Student Forum (MUN). At Balli's party, Dheeraj wanted to admit his feelings for Suhani, but he gets too high, thus never getting the chance. Dhruv attends Balli's party, where he gets high with Faruq, to Veer's anger. Although searching for his sister, Veer accompanies Saba to the party, where she drinks a drugged punch and gets high. Suhani and Neeraj decide to go to her house where after having sex with Suhani, Neeraj tries to steal money but is disrupted by Veer and Saba. As a result, she asks Veer to swim in his pool with her. Realizing her state, he refuses and calls a cab to take her home. Police raid Balli’s party and later beat Faruq, forcing Dhruv to give them money. At school the next day, Yashika sees Saba and Veer being friendly. Jealous, she reveals to Saba that Veer had asked him to take Saba's virginity. Saba confronts him. Koel and Sharan starts sexting with Balli. Neeraj blames Suhani's family for her murder.
4	Kabir Mehta & Gul Dharmani	Kersi Khambatta	3 February 2023
After their family is threatened, Neeraj is forced to settle a debt. He is offered a deal — he must kill someone, is revealed to be peon of Dheeraj’s former school as he has evidence against Ahuja Properties. Dhruv reveals to Veer he’s gay. Veer seeks forgiveness from Saba by buying her gifts, while Suhani shares her dark past with Dheeraj. Last year she started seeing Mayank Taneja, who leaked her intimate pictures causing Veer and his friends to nearly beat him to death.
5	Kabir Mehta & Gul Dharmani	Kersi Khambatta	3 February 2023
To get the top scores, Yashika bribes her teacher into giving her the top score on the exam with the promise of using her connections to get him promoted. Meanwhile, Veer tries to earn Saba's forgiveness. After joining his father’s business, to his disbelief and anger, Veer sees his father engaging in adultery. Dhruv reveals he doesn't really like swimming to Faruq, who himself is outed as gay and a drug dealer to Saba by Veer. Koel is shocked to see Sharan with Balli. Suhani finds Neeraj and helps him and his brother in stealing Kalra’s phone collection for money.
6	Kabir Mehta & Gul Dharmani	Kersi Khambatta	3 February 2023
Koel and her family are plagued by damaging data on a stolen phone, and Neeraj also learns that one of his stolen phones is more valuable than he thought. Suhani is caught with drugs at school and turns in her dealer. The doctor reveals that Suhani is pregnant, which causes Dheeraj to become hostile to Neeraj. Neeraj and Suhani plan to run away together. Faruq's family finds out about his drug dealing and Saba gets yelled at by her father for knowing about it. Saba blames Suhani for ruining her and her brother's life. Her scholarship goes to someone else. Koel grows suspicious of Suhani and her potential involvement in the disappearances of the phones.
7	Kabir Mehta & Gul Dharmani	Kersi Khambatta	3 February 2023
Yashika asks Veer to help her get the scholarship as she is neglected by her parents. Suhani tries to repair her friendship with Dheeraj. After learning about Faruq’s engagement, Dhruv stands up to his father. A violent brawl breaks out after Veer learns about Suhani's pregnancy. Balli leaks an intimate video of Sharan with him to aid Veer. Dheeraj blames Neeraj for murder during interrogation.
8	Kabir Mehta & Gul Dharmani	Kersi Khambatta	3 February 2023
The circumstances surrounding Suhani's death is revealed. At Hampton’s Founder's Day party, Suhani is revealed to earn a scholarship. Sharan has in fact murdered Suhani inadvertently with the trophy she received after a heated argument about her involvement with Koel's dad's phones, which he wanted to retrieve to prove his worth to Koel. However, Koel consoles Sharan and calls her father to handle the situation. After interrogations, the police arrest Neeraj. Later Dheeraj gets frustrated after he can’t find the prison where Neeraj is kept. Meanwhile, Koel and Sharan get blackmailing messages unbeknownst to them is sent by Balli who had seen them after the murder.

== Reception ==
=== Viewership ===
Class debuted at Number 1 on Netflix India's ‘Top 10 TV Shows in India Today’ list. It also debuted at Number 1 in Bangladesh while also debuting Top 10 in the ‘Top 10 TV Shows’ lists of Bahrain, Maldives, Mauritius, Oman, Pakistan, Qatar, UAE & Sri Lanka. The series saw 27.7 million hours viewed from its release date till 30 June, which made it 718th most watched title on Netflix for the first 6 months of the year 2023.

=== Critical response ===
Joel Keller for Decider stated "Class takes the Elite formula and layers on commentary about a class system unique to India, shifting the tone of the series just enough to make it distinctive from the original version."

Tamma Moksha for The Hindu wrote "Featuring a host of debutants, the show is set in Hampton International, a private school in Delhi that boasts of giant swimming pools, coveted MUN conferences, and prestigious scholarships to study abroad — an archetype of the perfect dream school… until a student is found murdered outside the school premises and her acquaintances become prime suspects."

Tushar Joshi for India Today rated 3.5 stars out of 5 stars and wrote "If you have watched Elite then you will end up drawing multiple parallels with Class. But if you let these comparisons stay far away from your experience, you are in for a reward. Class is some top-notch writing and also some brilliant casting. These boys and girls who represent two opposite diasporas of high school life look their part."

Archika Khurana of The Times of India wrote "Inspired by the Spanish version, the series producer and director, Ashim Ahluwalia, incorporates a posh school into the picture, where most of the scenes were shot. The production values are high and clearly on par with the Spanish school to depict the lifestyle of these hi-fi students."

Udita Jhunjhunwala for Scroll.in wrote "Series director Ashim Ahluwalia creates an immersive world of haves and have-nots, of entrenched prejudices embedded in Indian culture – whether about community, class, caste or sexuality. The color palette – glossy and cool for the wealthy homes, saturated and grittier for the less well-to-do spaces, along with the music, production design, and cinematography work with the easy-breezy dialogue opposite to Gen-Z."

Sanchita Jhunjhunwala of Zoom TV wrote "To be able to understand the dynamics and what goes through by just reading is something that won't be possible as there are quite a few complex plots and subplots all going at the same time, but they are all meaningful. With so many characters, it was rather easy to have lost the plot or either rush it up, but that does not happen with this show, for everything flows naturally, even the Indianisation of the entire storyline."

Aishwarya Vasudevan for OTTPlay wrote "Class deserves a chance, not for the plot but for the performances that overpower everything."

Debiparna Chakraborty of MovieWeb wrote "Despite having certain flaws, Class holds up on its own, and deftly interweaves a murder mystery with high school drama layered with caste, class, and religious clashes. The show's handling of themes like casteism, discrimination, and identity politics is sensitive and impactful, adding depth and complexity to its storylines. In fact, Class holds up on its own, perhaps even better than Elite, because of its robust politics and gritty stylistic choices that emphasize the suffocating reality it attempts to depict."

== Accolades ==
Year	Award ceremony	Category	Nominee / work	Result	Ref.
2023	Filmfare OTT Awards	Best Adapted Screenplay (Series)	Kersi Khambatta	Nominated	
2023	Filmfare OTT Awards	Best Background Music (Series)	Tubby	Nominated	
2023	Filmfare OTT Awards	Best Original Soundtrack (Series)	Aditya N., Nayantara Bhatkal, Chakori Dwivedi, Keshav Dhar, Akhilesh Jain	Nominated	
2023	Filmfare OTT Awards	Best Costume Design (Series)	Lovedeep Gulyani	Nominated	
2023	Filmfare OTT Awards	Best Sound Design (Series)	Bigyna Dahal	Nominated	
