= Bad Boy =

Bad Boy may refer to:

== Books ==
- Bad Boy (novel), a 2011 novel by Peter Robinson
- Bad Boy (1953 book), a 1953 autobiography by Jim Thompson
- Bad Boy (comics), a 1997 one-shot comic book by Frank Miller and Simon Bisley

== Film and television ==
- The Bad Boy (film), a 1917 American crime drama by Chester Withey
- Bad Boy (1935 film), an American film directed by John G. Blystone
- Bad Boy (1939 film), an American film directed by Herbert E. Meyer
- Bad Boy (1949 film), an American film starring Audie Murphy
- Bad Boy (1963 film) or The Bastard, a 1963 Japanese youth film directed by Seijun Suzuki
- Bad Boy, a 1990 Filipino action film starring Robin Padilla
- Bad Boy (2002 film) or Dawg, a dramedy starring Denis Leary and Elizabeth Hurley
- Bad Boy (2023 film) an Indian Hindi-language film
- "Bad Boy" (Kim Possible), an episode of Kim Possible
- Bad Boy (Israeli TV series), an Israeli TV series
- Bad Guy (TV series) or Bad Boy, a 2010 Korean TV drama starring Kim Nam Gil and Han Ga In

== Music ==
=== Albums ===
- Bad Boy (G. Dep and Loon album), 2007
- Bad Boy (Ringo Starr album), 1978
- Bad Boy (Robert Gordon album), 1980
- The Bad Boy (album), a 2006 album by Héctor el Father
  - Bad Boy: The Concert, a 2007 live album by Héctor el Father

=== Songs ===
- "Bad Boy" (The Adicts song), 1983
- "Bad Boy" (BigBang song), 2012
- "Bad Boy" (Chris Jedi, Gaby Music and Dei V song), 2024
- "Bad Boy" (Chung Ha and Christopher song), 2020
- "Bad Boy" (Hadise song), 2006
- "Bad Boy" (The Jive Bombers song), 1957
- "Bad Boy" (Juice Wrld and Young Thug song), 2021
- "Bad Boy" (Larry Williams song), 1959; covered by the Beatles, 1965
- "Bad Boy" (Marty Wilde song), 1959
- "Bad Boy" (Miami Sound Machine song), 1986
- "Bad Boy" (Red Velvet song), 2018
- "Bad Boy" (Skepta song), 2010
- "Bad Boy/Having a Party", by Luther Vandross, 1982
- "Bad Boy", by Alexia from The Party, 1998
- "Bad Boy", by Bad Gyal from La joia, 2024
- "Bad Boy", by Carys, 2019
- "Bad Boy", by Cascada from Everytime We Touch, 2007
- "Bad Boy", by Đông Nhi, 2014
- "Bad Boy", by Fally Ipupa, 2017
- "Bad Boy", by Keke Wyatt from Soul Sista, 2001
- "Bad Boy", by Keshia Chanté from Keshia Chanté, 2004
- "Bad Boy", by Marwa Loud, from the album Loud, 2018
- "Bad Boy", by Mary Wells from Bye Bye Baby I Don't Want to Take a Chance, 1961
- "Bad Boy", by Quiet Riot from Condition Critical, 1984
- "Bad Boy", by Ray Parker, Jr. from The Other Woman, 1982
- "Bad Boy", by Royce da 5'9" from Street Hop, 2009

=== Other uses in music ===
- Bad Boy Records, a record label founded by Sean "Diddy" Combs

== Other uses ==
- Bad boy clause, a provision within a contract which proscribes certain behavior
- Bad Boy (brand), a clothing and apparel brand
- Bad Boy (Gobots), a fictional character
- Lastman's Bad Boy Furniture, a Canadian furniture chain founded by Mel Lastman
- Bad boy archetype, a male who behaves badly within societal norms yet is attractive to women

== See also ==
- Peck's Bad Boy, a film based on a series of books by George W. Peck
- Bad Boys (disambiguation)
- Bad Girl (disambiguation)
- Good Boy, Bad Boy, a 2007 Indian film
