= Bad Girls =

Bad Girls may refer to:

== Film and television ==
- Bad Girls, 1981 pornographic film in the XRCO Hall of Fame
- Bad Girls (1994 film), film by Jonathan Kaplan
- "Bad Girls" (Buffy the Vampire Slayer), 1999 episode of the TV show Buffy the Vampire Slayer
- Bad Girls (TV series), British television series (1999–2006)
  - Bad Girls: The Musical, 2007 British West End musical based on the TV series
- Bad Girls (2007 film), Mexican film
- Bad Girls (2012 film), Taiwanese romantic-comedy

== Music ==
=== Albums ===
- Bad Girls (Donna Summer album), 1979
  - Bad Girls Tour, a 1979 concert tour by Donna Summer in support of the album
- Bad Girls (Mónica Naranjo album), 2002
- Bad Girls, a 2015 EP by MKTO

=== Songs ===
- "Bad Girls" (Donna Summer song), 1979
- "Bad Girls" (M.I.A. song), 2010
- "Bad Girls" (MKTO song), 2015
- "Bad Girls", a 2010 song by DJ Kay Slay from the album, More Than Just a DJ
- "Bad Girls", a 1983 song by Don Felder from the album, Airborne
- "Bad Girls", a 2001 song by Westlife from the album, World of Our Own
- "Bad Girls", a 2006 song by Vanilla Ninja from the album, Love Is War
- "Bad Girls", a 2010 song by Doda from the album, 7 pokus głównych
- "Bad Girls", a 2012 song by Solange from the EP, True
- "Bad Girls", a 2013 song by Lee Hyori from the album, Monochrome

== Literature ==
- Bad Girls (Wilson novel), 1996 children's novel by Jacqueline Wilson
- Bad Girls (Voigt novel), 1997 young-adult novel by Cynthia Voigt
- Bad Girls, 2005 novel by Alex McAulay
- Bad Girls, 2003 DC Comics series with covers by Darwyn Cooke
- B.A.D. Girls, Inc., a superhuman group in Marvel Comics

== Other uses ==
- Bad Girls (art exhibition), a 1994 exhibition curated by Marcia Tucker

== See also ==
- Bad Girls Club (disambiguation)
- B.ay A.rea D.erby Girls, a flat-track roller derby league
- Bad Boys (disambiguation)
- Bad Girl (disambiguation)
