= Bad Company (1946 film) =

1946 drama film directed by Paul Barrelet

- Directed by: Paul Barrelet
- Written by: R. Wakeley
- Starring: Mabel Constanduros; Diana Dawson
- Production company: Paul Barralet Productions
- Release date: 1946
- Running time: 44 minutes
- Country: United Kingdom
- Language: English

Bad Company is a 1946 British short second feature ('B') drama film directed by Paul Barrelet and written by R. Wakeley. It stars Mabel Constanduros and Diana Dawson.

== Plot ==
Mary Jeans, a backroom theatre worker, dreams of being a ballet dancer but is handicapped by a childhood leg injury. On the advice of friends she sees a surgeon, has her mobility restored, and is soon dancing. In an unrelated sub-plot, her boyfriend Tom Gilmore gives her a stolen diamond, and is subsequently arrested.

== Cast ==
- Mabel Constanduros as Ma White
- Diana Dawson as Mary Jeans
- Gordon Begg as Joe Graham
- Kenneth Mosely as Tom Gilmore
- Bob Elson as Peter Graham
- Granville Squires as ventriloquist
- Pauline Grant Ballet Company as themselves

== Reception ==
The Monthly Film Bulletin wrote: "This is an extremely crude production of an impossible story. The direction is poor and the continuity bad, and the scrappy excerpts from ballets danced by Pauline Grant and her troupe hardly compensate for the general lack of inspiration. The fact that one can study dancing as a child, leave off for ten years or more and then suddenly find oneself in a solo part in a ballet, creates an entirely wrong impression, and the years of hard work and study which go into the making of a ballet-dancer are not even mentioned. It all seems just a pleasant little game. The reason for introducing the story of Tom and his diamond has yet to be discovered."

Kine Weekly wrote: "The story of a cripple girl's rehabilitation and eventual success as a ballet dancer, amateurishly told, with only some unconventional scenes of ballet training to give it interest. The limitations of the production are all too obvious. While the main theme has a certain human interest, the sub-plot, dealing with the heroine's diamond-stealing boy friend, which gives the film its title, is quite unrelated in any dramatic sense to the rest of the story. ... Suffering from all the limitations which beset the 'modest' picture, and handicapped with a loosely written script, this film fails to create any dramatic appeal, and has to rely for such interest as it possesses upon some behind-the-scenes shots of the Pauline Grant Ballet. Even good work by Mabel Constanduros and a pleasantly natural heroine by Diana Dawson cannot do much to infuse life into the plot."
