= The SoapGirls =

South African–based rock band

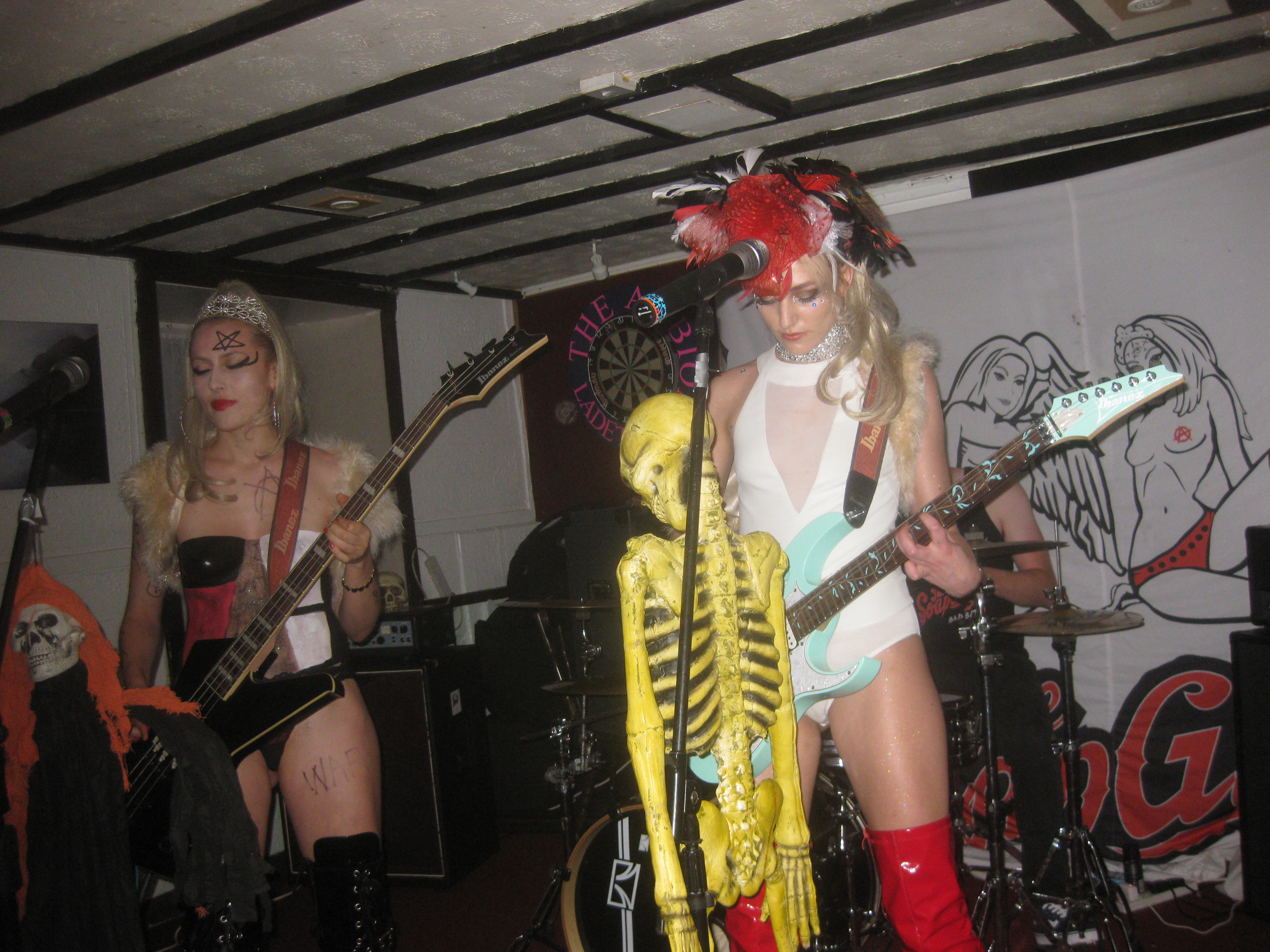
- The SoapGirls in 2016

Background information
- Origin: Cape Town, South Africa
- Genres: Alternative rock; dance-pop (early)
- Years active: 2010–present
- Labels: Self-released; Universal
- Members: Camille Debray; Noemie Debray; (See band members section for others.)

The SoapGirls are an alternative rock band consisting of French-born, South African-raised sisters Noemie Debray ("Mie") (guitar, vocals) and Camille Debray ("Mille") (bass guitar, vocals). They are sisters born about a year apart. The sisters are the only full members of the band, using various session drummers when touring and recording (see band members section). The band is DIY (independent of any major record label) and known for their almost constant touring, often playing 100 shows a year, and for their close connection to fans through their regular live streams and shows on YouTube. In November 2025, the band supported Wednesday13 for six dates, following on from a run of almost 70 dates of their Wild At Heart tour across US, UK, Europe and Japan.

The band have achieved press coverage in the music magazines Rolling Stone, Classic Rock, Planet Rock, Vive Le Rock, and Louder Than War, as well as on TotalRock.

Early in their professional career, the SoapGirls were a dance-pop act signed to the South African branch of Universal Music Group with whom they scored a number one hit album on the country's music chart.

== History ==
The Debrays began their music career as child street performers at ages 8 and 9 (c. 2004) in South Africa, singing while selling hand made soap for charity, from where they acquired their band name. They have been managed by Sam Debray since 2010.

At ages 12 and 13 (c. 2008) they took up an offer to record some songs in a studio. One result of this recording session was the inclusion of a track ("Boys Boys—Mix 2") on the Japanese compilation disc Do The Independence (And Bridge Build Burn By Yourself.) (2009). They also acquired pink, Hello Kitty branded acoustic guitars as a result of sponsorship by Marshall.

At ages 14 and 15 (c. 2010), following interest in the song on the Japanese compilation disc, they were signed to Universal Records where they scored a South African hit album, Xperience (2011), and four South African hit singles with exposure on a number of South African TV shows, compilation CDs, and national tours. The band became disillusioned by the "TSG Movement" image and their lack of creative control while signed to Universal. In a 2019 interview with Jude Benjamin of Camden Live Music Blog, Camille observed: "We hated it. We were always fighting for creative control, it was a fucking nightmare. For four years we were stuck. We had songs on the radio and it was very successful but at the end of the day if you don't believe in what you're doing, what's the point?"

Once their contract with Universal had terminated, the band went to New York City, recorded two released singles ("Lie To Me" and "Looking For Love") and other tracks for an unreleased album, but turned down another record deal because of the same problems with lack of control that they had previously with Universal. They returned to South Africa to continue releasing music on their own terms, including uploading music to YouTube. All singles and albums from 2014 to present have been self-released. 2014's single release "Hater" marks a turning point to a more punk or (as they call it) "Revolt Rock" musical style and image. They used a female drummer during this period, who can be seen briefly (in cartoon form) in the video for the single release "Champagne Cocaine" (2015).

In 2015, the band took up an offer to tour the UK, quickly finishing their debut album as a punk band, Calls For Rebellion, so they would have some product to promote and sell on the tour. The band have been touring for about 6 to 7 months of each year with various session drummers since 2015.

The band received attention after an incident at a gig during November 2015 in Hastings where venue staff attacked the band with a bucketful of stage blood. Noting their reputation, Camille observed in 2019: "As women we are labelled and if we don't fit the stereotypical role, we are seen as beeches (sic) who need to be tamed."

Summer and autumn of 2016 were spent on the Disturbd tour of UK and Europe. The single Bad Bitch was also recorded and released in 2016. It was written two days after the stage attack in Hastings of the previous year. This was included as a bonus track on the Societys Rejects album (2017).

Second punk album Societys Rejects was released in 2017. Hugh Guiland awarded the album 6/10 in Vive Le Rock magazine, noting that although there were "no major music revelations to be found here, admittedly," nonetheless there was "an attitudinal swerving of unwavering fuck-you hard rock, unstintingly high on the energy levels ... sometimes you've just got to let it all out." Online magazine Rock 'N' Load awarded the album 9/10, noting "Production is first class ensuring you live every kick of the drum and thrash of that guitar." Interviewed by Alexandra Hawkins for Louder Than War, the duo explained their philosophy: "We create Revolt Rock music that provides a space for people to celebrate their uniqueness and to stop taking shit from a seemingly heartless judgmental society. Both our stage shows and music addresses and encourages people to get out of their shells and forgo labels that society has imposed on them. Our message is all about freedom and being fearless enough to be a non-conformist and proud of it and if it makes you a society's reject then embrace it!"

Summer and autumn of 2017 were spent on the Party In Hell tour of UK and Europe. The 2017 tour used several session drummers, including Sam Ogden for some gigs in the last half of the tour. He has also played with the band extensively on the 2018 and 2019 tours.

The band spent most of 2018 on the Stinks Like Punk tour of UK and Europe. Most of 2019 was spent on the Sniff My Strap tour of UK and Europe. 2019 also saw the release of a double-length third punk album, Elephant in the Room.

In 2020–2021 they recorded their fifth album due for release in 2022 along with singles to be released before and during the 2022 tour. In April 2022, after a long absence from touring due to the COVID-19 pandemic, they commenced the Don't Give a Damn tour of UK, Europe, USA, and Japan. June 2022 saw the release of the fifth studio album (their fourth as an alt-rock band), In My Skin. In May 2023 they commenced the Love Potion tour of UK, USA, Europe, and Japan.

In May 2024 they commenced the Wild At Heart tour across the UK and Europe, lasting until October of that year. The SoapGirls hit the road again in 2025 for more 'Wild At Heart' tour dates, playing a run of almost 80 shows across three continents and 10 countries (US, UK, Europe and Japan). In November 2025, the band support Wednesday13 for six dates.

== Band members ==
=== Members ===
- Camille Debray – vocals, bass, acoustic bass (2004–present)
- Noemie Debray – vocals, guitar, acoustic guitar (2004–present)

=== Guest artists ===
- Redd Valentino Debray – guest vocals

=== Studio recording session drummers ===
- Arya Goggin – credited on Societys Rejects album
- Mark A Klein

== Discography ==
=== Studio albums ===
- Xperience (Universal Records South Africa, 2011) No. 1 South African album charts.
- Calls For Rebellion (The SoapGirls, 2015)
- Societys Rejects (The SoapGirls, 2017)
- Elephant in the Room (The SoapGirls, 2019)
- In My Skin (The SoapGirls, 2022)

=== Singles ===
- "Sour" (Universal Records South Africa, 2011)
- "Lucky Tonight" (Universal Records South Africa, 2011)
- "Hurricane" (Universal Records South Africa, 2012)
- "In My Arms" (Universal Records South Africa, 2012) (a.k.a. "In Your Arms")
- "Lie To Me" (Divine Order Entertainment, LLC, 2013)
- "Looking For Love" (Divine Order Entertainment, LLC, 2013)
- "Hater" (digital release, December 2014)
- "Champagne Cocaine" (digital release, 2015)
- "Bad Bitch" (digital release, 2016)
- "Rather Be Dead!" (digital release, 2016)
- "One Way Street" (digital release, 2019)
- "Heart in Bloom" (digital release, 2020-12-18)
- "Breathe" (digital release, 2022-04-15)

=== Compilations ===
- "Boys Boys—Mix2", Do The Independence (And Bridge Build Burn By Yourself.) (Bridge Build Burn Corporation, 2009 – GoTo-0000)
- "Sour", NOW That's What I Call Music! 59 (South Africa edition) (EMI, 2011 – CDNOWD(WEE)59)
- "Champagne Cocaine" (Justin Mercelina Trapmix), Wood Trip Hop, Vol. 1 (Catwalk Records, 2017 – CATWALKCOMP099)
