= Purina =

Purina may refer to:

- Ralston Purina, an American pet food company that was acquired in 2001
- Nestlé Purina PetCare, the pet food division of Swiss-based Nestlé S.A., and the acquirer of Ralston Purina Company in 2001 (subsequently merged with Nestlé's Friskies PetCare Company)
- Purina Mills, a farm animal feed company that was spun off from Ralston Purina Company
