= Wings (Kuzmin novel) =

Novel by Mikhail Kuzmin

- Cover of 2007 Modern Voices edition
- Author: Mikhail Kuzmin
- Original title: Крылья
- Language: Russian
- Genre: Novel
- Publication date: 1906
- Publication place: Russia
- Media type: Print (hardcover)

Wings (Russian: Крылья) was the first Russian novel centred on homosexuality. Written by Mikhail Kuzmin, it was printed in 1906 to the consternation of a conservative literary establishment.

== Plot ==
The novel deals with teenager Vanya Smurov's attachment to his older, urbane mentor, Larion Stroop, a pederast who initiates him into the world of early Renaissance, Classical and Romantic art. At the close of the first part, Vanya is shocked to learn that the object of his admiration frequents a gay bathhouse. In order to sort out his feelings, Vanya withdraws into the Volga countryside, but his sickening experience with rural women, whose call on him to enjoy his youth turns out to be an awkward attempt at seduction, induces Vanya to accept his Classics teacher's proposal and accompany him in a journey to Italy. In the last part of the novel, Vanya and Stroop, who is also in Italy, are seen enjoying the smiling climate and stunning artworks of Florence and Rome, while Prince Orsini mentors the delicate youth in the art of hedonism.

== Reception ==
The novel, partly based on Kuzmin's experience of travelling to Italy in 1897, is full of conversation in the Platonic vein; the title itself alludes to Phaedrus. Although the book was competently written in an elegant style all its own, its reputation has been dogged by scandal.

Kuzmin was one of the first writers in modern Europe to argue that homosexuality "was not immoral or ungodly, but morally distinctive, ethically sanctioned, and even at times spiritually superior, a matter not of decadent immoralism but the personal creation of values".

The central theme of aestheticized sensuality has spawned comparisons of Wings with contemporary works by Oscar Wilde and André Gide, which cover similar thematic territory. Nevertheless, Kuzmin was probably the first literary figure of some standing to approve same-sex love in print:

"Wilde in The Picture of Dorian Gray (1890) only hinted that his hero's inner corruption resulted from his suppression of his true nature; Gide did not dare to name the attraction of his hero in The Immoralist (1902); Proust felt impelled to engage in all manner of subterfuge, and Forster wrote Maurice for the desk drawer."

Vladimir Nabokov parodied Kuzmin's novel in his own short novel The Eye, using "Smurov" as the name of a male protagonist and "Vanya" of a female one.
