= Yury Yurkun =

Russian writer and poet (1895-1938)

Yury Ivanovich Yurkun
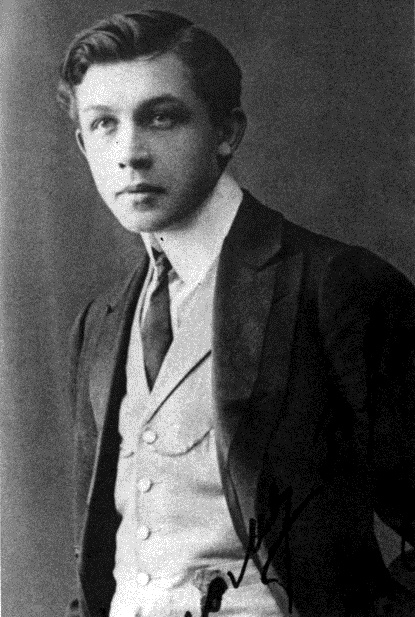
- Born: 17 September 1895; Sedūnai, Russian Empire
- Died: 20 September 1938 (aged 43); Leningrad, Soviet Union
- Writing career
- Genre: Surrealism

Yury Ivanovich Yurkun (born Juozas Jurkūnas, Russian: Ю́рий Ива́нович Юрку́н; 17 September 1895 – 20 September 1938) was a Lithuanian-born Russian writer and painter, and lover of poet Mikhail Kuzmin. Described as an "esthete who drew in the style of Jacques Vaché", Yurkun is considered the first Russian surrealist writer.

== Biography ==
=== Early life ===
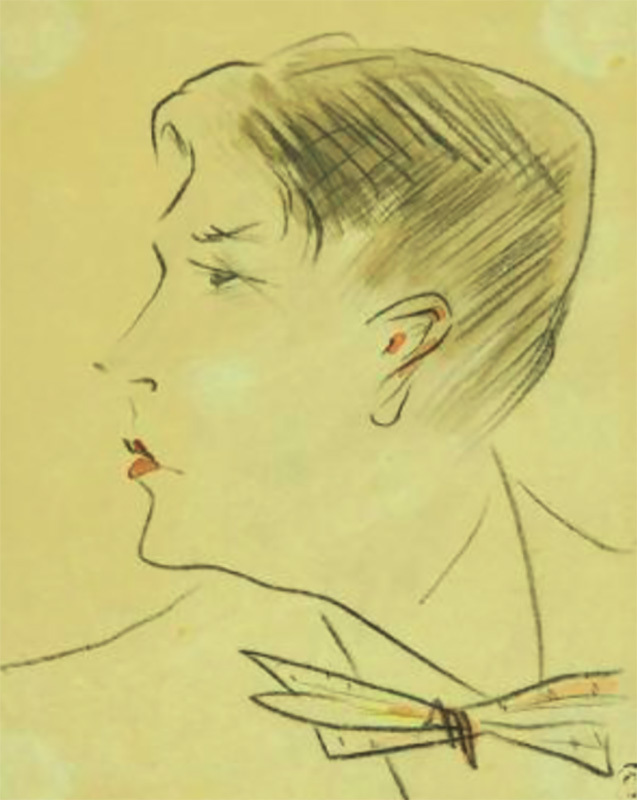
Self portrait of Yury Yurkun

Yurkun was born on 17 September 1895 in the village of Sedūnai, then part of the Russian Empire. Hailing from a Catholic family, his original name is Juozas, written as Iosif (Иосиф) in Russian. His parents were peasants Jonas Jurkūnas and Veronika Ananytė. He acted in a theatre troupe and in 1910 left Vilnius to travel deeper into the Russian Empire. Yurkun visited Kiev in 1913, where he eventually met Mikhail Kuzmin. To Yurkun, Kuzmin dedicated the cycle On the Journey (V doroge, dated February–August 1913). On 3 March 1913, Kuzmin wrote in his diary: "I just cannot get my writing going; the closest possible friendship with Nagrodskaya (Yevdokiya Nagrodskaya), my love for Yurkun, my departure from the Sudeikins - that is all that has happened." While with Kuzmin, Yurkun also had a relationship with Nadezhda Zborovskaya-Auslender, an actress and wife of Kuzmin's nephew. The relationship with Kuzmin was not easy as the poet writes in his diary dated 27 May 1913: "I love him very much, but his obstinacy and hooliganism will destroy him, no doubt about it".

=== Work in St. Petersburg and Kiev ===
Yurkun's profession in Kiev is unknown. He was possibly an actor working under the pseudonym "Mogandri". Others state he was a clerk in a bookstore. He went back to St. Petersburg with Kuzmin and they remained together until Kuzmin's death in 1936. In 1917 Yurkun was conscripted by the Bolsheviks, but deserted soon after. In 1918 Yurkun was arrested and detained for a brief period. Yurkun belonged to the "emotionalist" literary group, and was acquainted with poets like Anna Akhmatova, Alexander Blok, Osip Mandelstam, among others. While in St. Petersburg, Yurkun published Swedish Gloves, Bad Company, and other short stories, plays, and poems.

=== Later years and death ===
In December 1920, Yurkun met his future wife, Olga Gildebrandt Arbenina, a young actress using the stage name of her father, Arbenin. The marriage legally never happened, but they considered themselves married. Yurkun, Arbenina, and Kuzmin continued to live together with Yurkun's mother in the same communal apartment. Yurkun was prohibited from publishing his works in 1923. Consequently, he began painting; Yurkun belonged to the artist group Thirteen. In 1931 the Soviet secret police searched their apartment and confiscated Yurkun's manuscripts, forcing him to sign an agreement to cooperate. Two years after Kuzmin's death, in 1938, Yurkun was arrested and soon after executed in a massive political purge on 20 September 1938. He was rehabilitated in 1958.

== Gallery ==
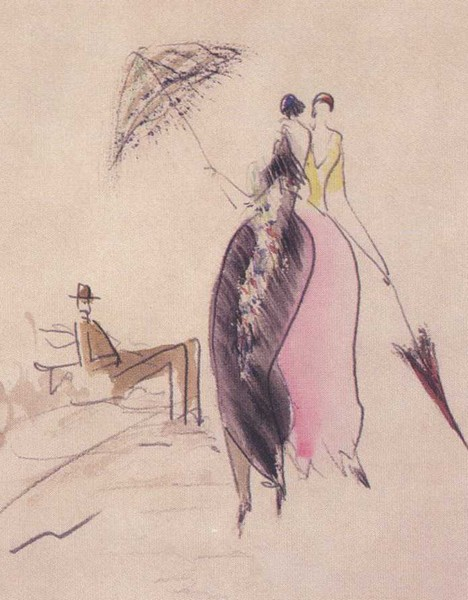
Ladies with umbrellas (the scene in the Park)

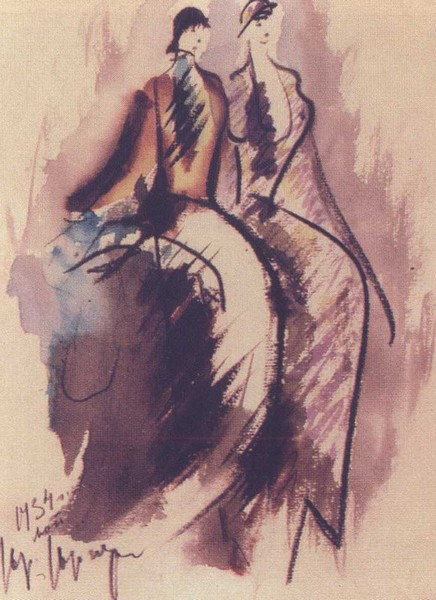
Ladies in crinolines

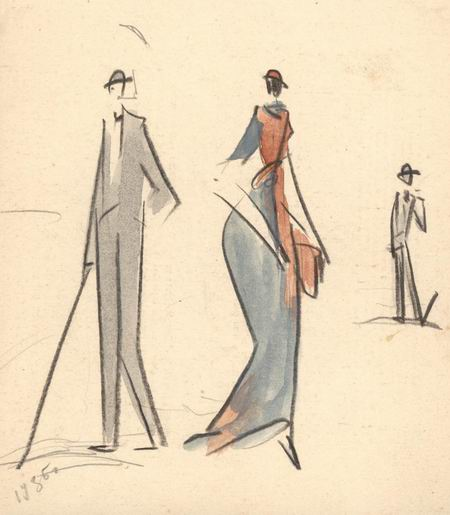
Street scene
