= Anjali Sivaraman =

Indian actress

- Born: Kerala, India
- Height: 5 ft 6 in (168 cm)
- Mother: Chitra Iyer

Anjali Sivaraman is an Indian actress and singer known for starring in the Netflix film Cobalt Blue (2022), Bad Girl (2025) and series Class (2023).

== Early life and career ==
Anjali Sivaraman was born to Chitra Iyer, an Indian playback singer who worked primarily in Malayalam films, and Vinod Sivaraman, who worked in the Indian Air Force. She moved around a lot as a child due to her father's job, English was the language she spoke growing up. Although she doesn't speak Tamil, she understands the language.

After getting her start in television commercials, Sivaraman gained recognition through modeling for designers like Tarun Tahiliani and Sabyasachi and playing the lead role in Netflix's Class, an adaptation of the Spanish series Elite.

In 2026, she will play Amrita Sher-Gil in the biopic Amri.

== Filmography ==
=== Films ===
Year	Title	Role(s)	Language	Notes	Ref.
2022	Cobalt Blue	Anuja Dixit	Hindi		
2025	Bad Girl	Ramya	Tamil		
2027	Amri	Amrita Sher-Gil	English	Post-production	

=== Web series ===
Year	Title	Role	Notes	Ref
2018	PM Selfiewallie	Meera	Main cast; 7 episodes	
2023	Class	Suhani Ahuja	Main cast; 8 episodes	
2026	Hathras – 16 Days	Investigative Journalist		
