= Evil Woman =

Evil Woman may refer to:

- "Evil Woman" (Crow song), later covered by Black Sabbath
- "Evil Woman" (Electric Light Orchestra song), 1975
- "Evil Woman", a song by Greg Page from his 1998 debut album
- "Evil Woman", a song by Guy Darrell, later covered by Spooky Tooth, Canned Heat, and Quiet Riot
- "Evil Woman", a song by Zeke from the album Death Alley
- "Evil Woman", a song by The Doobie Brothers from their album The Captain and Me
- The international name for the film Saving Silverman
