= Bad Girl (2025 film) =

2025 Tamil film

- Theatrical release poster
- Directed by: Varsha Bharath
- Written by: Varsha Bharath
- Produced by: Vetrimaaran; Anurag Kashyap
- Starring: Anjali Sivaraman
- Cinematography: Preetha Jayaraman; Jagadeesh Ravi; Prince Anderson
- Edited by: Radha Sridhar
- Music by: Amit Trivedi
- Production company: Grass Root Film Company
- Release dates: 7 February 2025 (International Film Festival Rotterdam); 5 September 2025 (India)
- Running time: 112 minutes
- Country: India
- Language: Tamil

Bad Girl is a 2025 Indian Tamil-language coming-of-age drama film written and directed by Varsha Bharath, starring Anjali Sivaraman in the lead role. The film is produced and presented by Vetrimaaran under his Grass Root Film Company banner, along with Anurag Kashyap. After its premiere at the International Film Festival Rotterdam on 7 February 2025, the film released in theatres on 5 September 2025.

== Cast ==
- Anjali Sivaraman as Ramya (dubbed by Varsha Bharath)
- Shanthipriya as Sundari, Ramya's mother (dubbed by Aarthi Vetrimaaran)
- Saranya Ravichandran as Selvi
- Hridhu Haroon as Nalan
- Teejay Arunasalam as Irfan
- Sashank Bommireddipalli as Arjun
- M. J. Shriram as Ramya's father

== Production ==
The film marks the directorial debut of Varsha Bharath, who had earlier worked as an assistant director in Udhayam NH4 (2013), and with Vetrimaaran in his films Visaranai (2016) and Vada Chennai (2018). The film is produced and presented by Vetrimaaran under his Grass Root Film Company banner, along with Anurag Kashyap. The coming-of-age film stars Anjali Sivaraman in the lead role, alongside Shanthipriya, Saranya Ravichandran, Hridhu Haroon, Teejay Arunasalam, Sashank Bommireddipalli and others in important roles. The technical team consists of Preetha Jayaraman, Jagadeesh Ravi, and Prince Anderson handling the cinematography, with Radha Sridhar handling the editing and Amit Trivedi handling the music.

== Music ==
The film has music composed by Amit Trivedi in his Tamil debut. The first single "Please Yenna Appadi Paakadhey" was released on 28 March 2025, and the second single "Naan Thani Pizhai" on 18 July. The soundtrack was released through Sony Music India on 8 August.

== Release ==
=== Premiere ===
Bad Girl premiered at the 54th International Film Festival Rotterdam on 7 February 2025.

=== Theatrical ===
The film had its theatrical release on 5 September 2025. The Hindi version released in theatres on 26 September 2025.

=== Home media ===
The post-theatrical streaming rights of the film were bought by JioHotstar and the satellite rights of the film were bought by Vijay TV and Colors Tamil.

== Accolades ==
The film won the NETPAC Award at the 54th International Film Festival Rotterdam.

At the 2025 Vancouver International Film Festival, it won the Audience Award for the Focus program.

== Reception ==
Janani K of India Today gave 3.5/5 stars and wrote "Director Varsha Bharath's 'Bad Girl' is a fantastic coming-of-age film of a woman. This lovely gem of a film lays bare patriarchy and showcases how women are slowly breaking away from generational trauma." Prashanth Vallavan of Cinema Express gave 3.5/5 stars and wrote "Beyond its portrayal of a rebellious spirit, the structural constraints of the patriarchal system, and the nourishing powers of sisterhood, Bad Girl also offers an authentic examination of a flawed protagonist. [...] Bad Girl packs more such layers and carefully folds several societal commentaries within those layers. But where it gains your admiration is how it plays all of it subtly, focusing entirely on the coming-of-age story of Ramya, with the warts and charm of it all." M Suganth of The Times of India gave 3.5/5 stars and wrote "Debutante Varsha Bharath's raw and realistic coming-of-age drama is that rare film that also manages to be a delicate character study of a young girl. [...] This is that rare female-centric film that never keeps nudging about the fact."

Sanjana Ganesh of The Hindu wrote "Director Varsha Bharath's Bad Girl brings to Tamil cinema, a rare, immersive, and layered, coming-of-age feature film told from a woman's perspective." Bharathy Singaravel of The News Minute wrote "While ‘Bad Girl’ certainly has heart, sometimes it's hard to relate to its protagonist, who seems to be fighting a personal battle rather than attempting any feminist endeavour to question caste hierarchy." Nandini Ramnath of Scroll.in wrote "Bad Girl is a feminine, feminist riposte to films that explore the highs and lows of romantic relationships from the male perspective. Bharath's ear for conversational dialogue and eye for scene-setting are so confident, so smooth that it's sometimes easy to forget what she is doing here." Rajasekar S of The Federal wrote "Varsha Bharath's debut signals the arrival of a promising voice that could deliver even more powerful stories with greater dramatic intensity in the future. For its fresh perspective on female friendships, mother-daughter relationships, and the quest for independence, Bad Girl is a film that demands attention and sparks hope for more such narratives in Tamil cinema."

Krishna Selvaseelan of Tamil Guardian wrote "Overall, ‘Bad Girl’ is hopefully the start of something new for Tamil cinema. There are many pieces of media in the last ten years in the West that tackle this subject, such as 2015's ‘The Diary of a Teenage Girl,’ 2017's ‘Lady Bird’ and the BBC show ‘Fleabag.’ It should be celebrated that there is now a filmmaker who can explore something that has been a sore blind-spot in Tamil cinema." Prathyush Parasuraman of The Hollywood Reporter India wrote "The film's motions, even as they have a joyful skip, and thoughtful observations, begin to feel trivial and repetitive, until Bad Girl realises, alongside Ramya, that sexual desire is not, perhaps, the balm to her bane. But it is too late—the cynicism has set in, the knots feel impossibly tight, and any direction towards hope feels like a patch of sunlight, when what the film was after was a floodlit life."

== Controversy ==
Soon after the release of the teaser on 26 January 2025, director Mohan G. Kshatriyan on his X (formerly Twitter) handle claimed that the film is portraying Brahmins in a bad light, following which several criticisms broke out in social media for promoting underage drinking and misrepresenting a specific community. Criticisms were more directed towards the film's producers, Vetrimaaran and Anurag Kashyap, and the criticisms further escalated into personal attacks and trolls on Pa. Ranjith, and the families of Vijay Sethupathi and Vetrimaaran. In reply to the backlash surfacing over the media, Varsha stated that her film isn't targeting any specific community and added that she can only make films that are relatable, familiar and personal to her. Despite the film being certified 'U/A' by the Central Board of Film Certification, the Madurai bench of the Madras High Court directed the Central government to remove the teaser from the social media, after an argument that the film's teaser is depicting children in an offensive way. The 'U/A' certificate was issued after many profanities were muted and a few intimate visuals, approximately 20%, were deleted from the film's final runtime of 112 minutes.
