= Alexei Purin =

Russian poet and critic (born 1955)

Alexei Purin (full name Alexei Arnol'dovich Purin, Russian: Алексе́й Арно́льдович Пу́рин) (born 1955) is a Russian poet and critic.

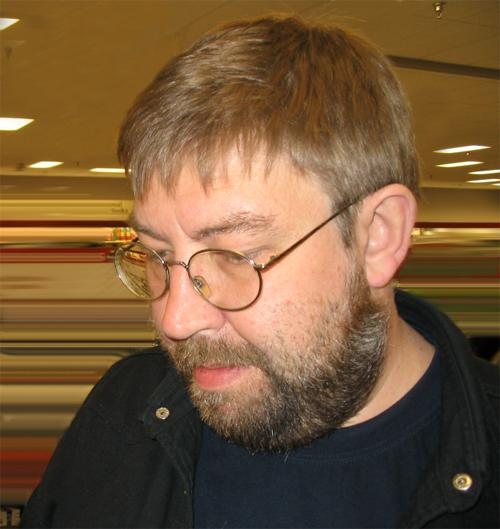

Born in Leningrad, Purin graduated from the Leningrad Technological Institute as a chemical engineer but soon turned to literature. In the 1970s he became part of the group around the poet Alexander Kushner, who opposed the government's socialist realism but also rejected the "underground poetry" often found in samizdat publication.

For Purin and his circle the core concepts of literary art were the ‘everyday word’ of Innokentii Annenski (1856-1909), who inspired the Acmeists, a group of early-20th-century poets reacting against the vagueness and affectations of Symbolism, and Mandelshtam’s ‘nostalgia for a world culture’. Purin’s first book of poems contains the much-discussed cycle ‘Eurasia’ (1985), which deals with his years of military service in Karelia on the Finnish border. ‘Never before has the Red Army been written about in this manner,’ said the reviewer of Novii Mir... The combination of earthliness and literary condensation in Eurasia became Purin’s trademark.

Yevgeny Rein said of him: "A poet of wide, organically digested culture, a poet of the rarest technical equipment, he sends his muse along two paths: complex classical stylizations based on rarely visited poetic regions (Alexandria, the ancient East, Greece of the times of Pericles and Alcibiades, the early Middle Ages), and the other, simpler path, that of lyric exercises, impressions from touristic Europe, normal love lyrics, sometimes with an exotic tendency." He has been in charge of the poetry section of the St. Petersburg literary review Zvezda (The Star) since 1989 and editor of Urbi, a literary almanac, since 1995.

== Bibliography ==
=== Poetry ===
- Лыжня (Ski Track), 1987.
- Евразия и другие стихотворения Алексея Пурина (Eurasia and other poems by Alexei Purin), 1995.
- Созвездие Рыб (The Constellation Pisces), 1996.
- Архаика (Antiquity), 1998.
- Сентиментальное путешествие (Sentimental Journey), 2000.
- Новые стихотворения (New Poems), 2002.
- Неразгаданный рай (Unsolved Paradise), 2004.

=== Translations ===
- Rainer Maria Rilke, Сонеты к Орфею [Sonnets to Orpheus], 2002.

=== Essays ===
- Воспоминания о Евтерпе (Memories of Euterpe), 1996.
- Утраченные аллюзии (Lost Allusions), 2001.
