= Abhay season 3 =

Abhay
- Season 3
- Starring: Kunal Khemu; Asha Negi; Rahul Dev; Tanuj Virwani; Divya Agarwal; Nidhi Singh
- No. of episodes: 8

Release
- Original network: ZEE5

The third season of psychological crime thriller web series Abhay 3 is released on 8 April 2022 on ZEE5. It consists of 8 episodes, each running approximately 40 to 50 minutes. The season mostly covers about Abhay facing a new unknown threat. The series is directed by Ken Ghosh and stars Kunal Khemu, Vijay Raaz, Asha Negi, Rahul Dev, Tanuj Virwani, Vidya Malavade, Divya Agarwal, and Nidhi Singh.

== Plot ==
Abhay faces a new unknown threat, a dark force capable of exploiting anyone in the name of a twisted belief.

== Cast ==
- Kunal Khemu, as Abhay
- Vijay Raaz, as Mrityu
- Asha Negi, as Sonam
- Rahul Dev, as Avtar
- Tanuj Virwani, as Kabir
- Divya Agarwal, as Harleen
- Nidhi Singh, as Khushboo
- Vidya Malvade, as Nidhi

== Reception ==
According to Sibal Chatterjee from NDTV "Kunal Khemu Sails Through Gruesome Season With Effortless Ease." Ronak Kotecha from Times of India wrote "A gritty and relentless crime thriller".

== Episodes ==
No.	No. in season	Title	Directed by	Written by	Original release date
1	1	Like, Share, Kill	Ken Ghosh	Aparna Nadig, Shubham Sharma and Sudhanshu Sharma	8 April 2022
No more than 5 days after the events of season 2, we meet Abhay again as he attempts to solve the case of 11 people who have gone missing from the highways connecting NCR to the capitals of neighboring states. He apprehends a gang of thugs who confess to 6 out of the 11 cases but 5 remain unsolved. We meet the people responsible for those, a young couple, Kabir and Harleen, who are social media influencers in front of the world but are heinous thrill-seeking murderers away from the cameras. As Abhay continues to investigate the case, it is revealed that Abhay acquired the information about that case from Sonam, whom he has kept captive. Khushboo in the meantime digs into Natasha's death. We end the episode with a tease for the Season's big bad, Mrtyu, as a woman kills her infant following his instructions.
2	2	Highway to Hell	Ken Ghosh	Aparna Nadig, Shubham Sharma and Sudhanshu Sharma	8 April 2022
Kabir and Harleen abduct and murder a young woman, to satisfy their itch just before leaving for Canada forever. Abhay finds the crumbs when there don't seem to be any and manages to catch the killers. He then plays them against each other and breaks them during an intense interrogation to get confessions. Khushboo gets closer to the perpetrator of Natasha's murder as she tracks down the drug used to kill her and finds Abhay's connection to it. Abhay returns to Sonam after solving the case but finds her in a pool of her own blood. She seemingly tried to kill herself. Abhay rushes to save her life. The epilogue and prologue of the episode establish the main villain, Mrtyu, and his cult further as they begin to put their heinous plan into action after a comet appears in the sky.
3	3	Monster on the Loose	Ken Ghosh	Aparna Nadig, Shubham Sharma and Sudhanshu Sharma	8 April 2022
Mrtyu's plan is kicked into gear as the insane infinity killer he left loose, starts to kill people chosen at random. He sees them asking for mukti and he grants it. Abhay just about saves Sonam but then get pulled towards some disciplinary and emotional issues of his son sahil at his school. He has to juggle all this along with the case of the insane killer at hand. For the first time Abhay faces a foe who has no fixed MO or pattern. But out of the blue, the head psychiatrist from the govt. Asylum in the city comes to the STF and tells them that the killer is a patient of his. This psychiatrist is Anant, Mrtyu's alter ego. The insane killer remains at large in the city and ends up killing a cop, inciting a city-wide man hunt. As Abhay is hot on the heels of the killer Sonam escapes and fakes her own death to frame Abhay for it.
4	4	Night of Terror	Ken Ghosh	Aparna Nadig, Shubham Sharma and Sudhanshu Sharma	8 April 2022
A thrilling city-wide manhunt kicks into gear, to catch the insane infinity killer who escaped after killing a cop. He grants mukti to those who ask him for it, more blood is shed. Abhay, his team, and the police look for the killer, aided by the police control room overview of the CCTV surveillance set up across the city. However, Mrtyu's cult creates chaos across the city to distract the police and Abhay from nabbing the killer. They aid his purpose of giving mukti to people. The distractions work, Abhay's team is divided to head in different directions, and this results in the brutal death of one of STF's own at the hands of the killer. An enraged Abhay catches the killer and is about to put him down but media intervention stops him. As per the law, the STF has no choice but to hand the insane killer back to Mrtyu/Anant. The specter of Sonam's death and the tension it causes between Khushboo and Abhay is apparent throughout the episode. As this case ends another infinity killer rears his head in Delhi. Abhay is ordered to leave to catch him while the Sonam Khanna case is handed to Khushboo.
5	5	Avtar Gatha	Ken Ghosh	Aparna Nadig, Shubham Sharma and Sudhanshu Sharma	8 April 2022
Abhay heads to Delhi and starts to investigate the day light, public assassination of a philanthropic icon named Sharda tai, at the hands of the second infinity killer. Khushboo begins to investigate the Sonam khanna death. We meet the second infinity killer who calls himself avatar, who is giving mukti to the best of the best as a reward. But the media and the STF paint him as the dreadful killer he is. To explain his side, he drops the gatha(manuscript) he has written about himself and his motives at the STF office. Abhay follows the crumbs found in that manuscript to narrow down where the killer could be and arranges a drone surveillance of the large forest area. Khushboo finds evidence to convict Abhay for the Sonam khanna murder. Mrtyu in the meanwhile brings the insane killer back to the asylum and finds out about a cult member attempting to run away.
6	6	Infinity and Beyond	Ken Ghosh	Aparna Nadig, Shubham Sharma and Sudhanshu Sharma	8 April 2022
Abhay's drone surveillance leads him to the killer's hideout in the forest but by the time he gets there the killer is already gone. Abhay finds clues in Avtar's hut as to where he might be and who his next victims will be. Avtar in the meantime reaches the city and sets up his sniper's nest over a good Samaritans award function. He is there to reward the recipients of the award with mukti but Abhay foils his plans. This agitates Avtar and he begins to shoot those who have become obstacles in the way of his purpose. Several people lose their lives but Abhay manages to locate the sniper's nest and flush Avtar out of it. A chase ensues and Avtar is surrounded, but rather than getting caught he kills himself after cryptically warning everyone that Mrtyu is coming for everyone. Abhay takes the warning seriously and finds out that the first infinity killer and Avtar were two of three Avtar's of Mrtyu and one more remain who will spill more blood before the comet disappears from the sky. Abhay heads back to Lucknow but is arrested by Khushboo on the way for Sonam Khanna's murder. Mrtyu catches the defector from his cult and punishes him.
7	7	Moment of Truth	Ken Ghosh	Aparna Nadig, Shubham Sharma and Sudhanshu Sharma	8 April 2022
Khushboo and Abhay face off in the interrogation room. She lays out the open-shut case that she has built against him but then one by one Abhay pokes holes in all of it and hands her a lead to follow if she wishes to know the truth. He gives her details regarding the missing person case filed by the parents of one of Sonam's media house colleagues. She is the girl whose body Sonam used to fake her death. Khushboo follows the lead and finds Sonam who tries to kill Khushboo but Khushboo ends up killing Sonam in self-defense. The case built against Abhay falls apart and he is let go. But as soon as he is freed he receives the bad news that his son has gone missing. Throughout the season we have shown Abhay attempting to mend their relationship but Saahil keeps spiraling into emotional oblivion. Before Abhay's arrest he promised Saahil that he will bring him back home but couldn't because of the circumstances. This final broken promise was the last straw, which leads Saahil to run away from home and end up in the hands of Mrtyu's cult. Mrtyu and his cult have been preparing for some end game, some big event throughout the season and now that event is taking place. 200 plus people will be congregating at this event with desires to free themselves from their problems, suffering, and misery but the only solution Mrtyu and his cult have is death. Abhay follows his son to the event and is apprehended by the cult. Mrtyu uses a concoction of psychedelics and Scalopomine to make anyone and everyone compliant to his wishes. He will use the same to make the crowd kill themselves and He uses the same to push Abhay into insanity so he kills himself too... The episode ends as Abhay stands in front of another Abhay intent on killing him
8	8	Mrityu Ya Mukti	Ken Ghosh	Aparna Nadig, Shubham Sharma and Sudhanshu Sharma	8 April 2022
As Mrtyu begins his event that will result in the death of over 200 people, Abhay fights himself and his demons under the influence of the drugs, but his love for his son helps him fight back. As he successfully does so he realises that he was fighting the infinity killer and not himself. He proceeds to look for his son through the asylum as Khushboo and the team land outside, following the only lead that can lead them to the third avtar of Mrtyu, the infinity killer. But they aren't allowed in as cult members intent on killing themselves block their way. But Abhay who is already inside manages foil Mrtyu's plans, who attempts to flee and give mukti to himself before the comet disappears. Abhay stops him and finds out that sahil has been chosen for the ritual that helps the cult find the next generation of avatars. He doesn't allow Mrtyu to die and saves his son who has been buried in the ground just like Mrtyu, the infinity killer and avtar were buried when they were young. Abhay leaves the force to realize his dream of living a happy, fulfilling life with his son. As Mrtyu attempts to rebuild his cult in prison, he is taken out by Abhay without anyone knowing.
