= List of films about women's issues =

This is a list of films about women's issues.

== Films about women's issues ==
Title	Year	Director(s)	Topic(s)	Summary
Agora	2009	Alejandro Amenábar	History	
Bread and Roses	2000	Ken Loach	Labour rights	
Buddha Collapsed out of Shame	2007	Hana Makhmalbaf	Female education	
De tu ventana a la mía	2011	Paula Ortiz		
El patio de mi cárcel	2008	Belén Macías	Women in prison	
Erin Brockovich	2000	Steven Soderbergh	Biography; Labour rights	
Katmandu	2011	Icíar Bollaín		
Hula Girls	2006	Lee Sang-il		
I, the Worst of All	1990	María Luisa Bemberg	Biography	
Iron Jawed Angels	2004	Katja von Garnier	Right to vote	
Jane Eyre	2011	Cary Fukunaga		
Las 13 rosas	2007	Emilio Martinez-Lazaro	Women in prison	
Libertarias	1996	Vicente Aranda	Women in war	
Made in L.A.	2007	Almudena Carracedo	Labour rights	
Mataharis	2007	Icíar Bollaín		
Mona Lisa Smile	2003	Mike Newell		
Moolaadé	2004	Ousmane Sembène	Female genital mutilation	
Ni dios, ni patrón, ni marido	2010	Laura Mañá	Labour rights	
North Country	2005	Niki Caro	Labour rights	
Persepolis	2007	Marjane Satrapi; Vincent Paronnaud		
Pray the Devil Back to Hell	2008	Gini Reticker		
Rabbit-Proof Fence	2002	Phillip Noyce	Female slavery	
Shinaakht	2018	Pragyesh Singh at IMDb	Female genital mutilation	
Sylvia	2003	Christine Jeffs	Biography	
Take My Eyes	2003	Icíar Bollaín	Domestic violence	
The Circle	2000	Jafar Panahi		
The Color Purple	1985	Steven Spielberg		
The Flowers of War	2011	Zhang Yimou		
The Help	2011	Tate Taylor		
The Hours	2002	Stephen Daldry		
The Sleeping Voice	2011	Benito Zambrano	Women in prison	
The Source	2011	Radu Mihăileanu		
The Stoning of Soraya M.	2008	Cyrus Nowrasteh		
Thelma & Louise	1991	Ridley Scott	Rape	
Vera Drake	2004	Mike Leigh	Abortion	
Violeta Went to Heaven	2001	Andrés Wood		
War Witch	2012	Kim Nguyen	Women in war	
Water	2005	Deepa Mehta	Widowhood	
Where Do We Go Now?	2011	Nadine Labaki		
Women of '69, Unboxed	2014	Peter Barton	Marriage, careers	
Birth/Rebirth	2023	Laura Moss	Abortion, child loss	

== Directors ==
Some directors that cover this topic in their films:

- Icíar Bollaín

== See also ==
- Women's cinema
- Women's rights
