= Ashish R. Shukla =

Indian director and writer

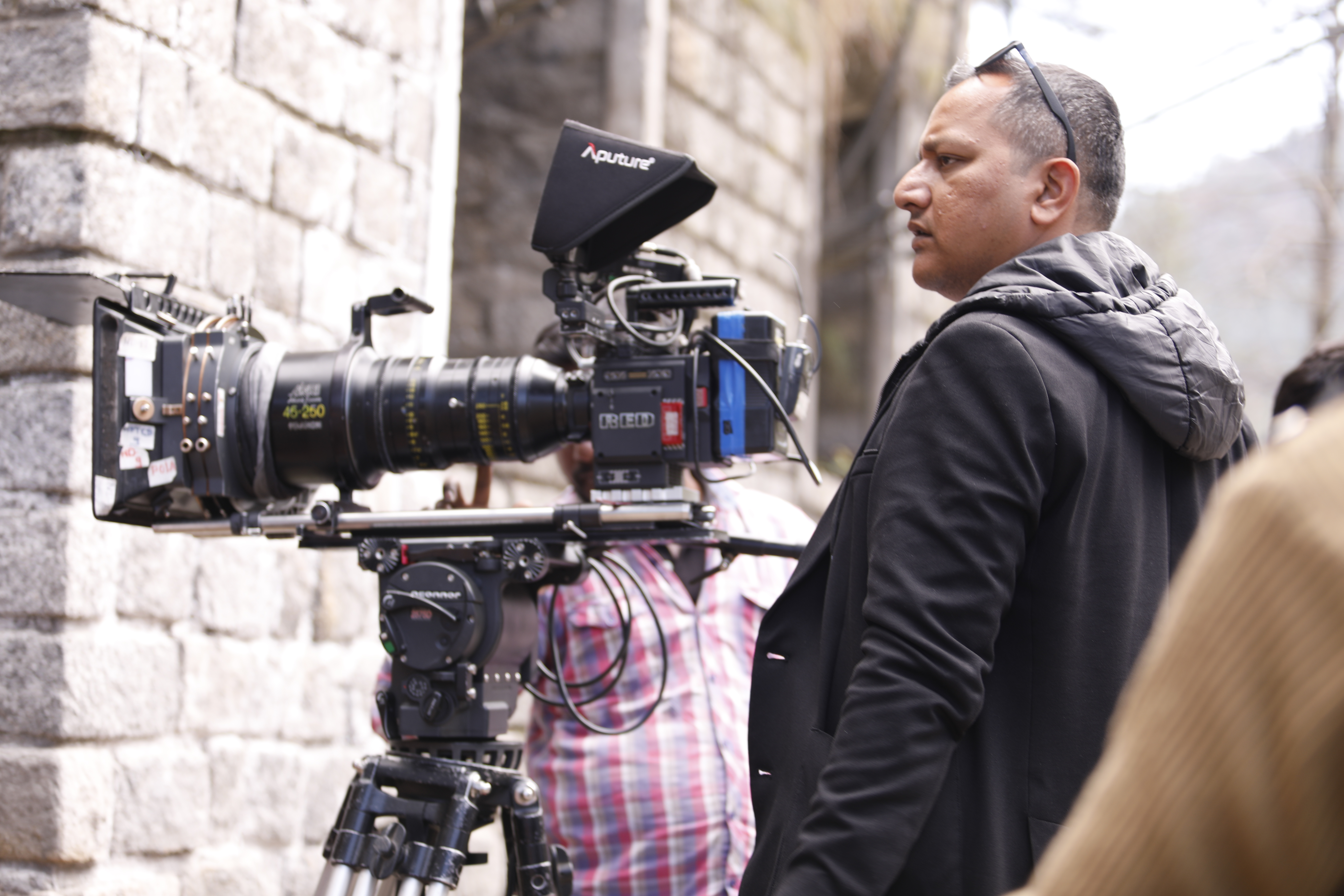
- Shukla during a shoot
- Born: India
- Occupations: Film director, writer
- Years active: 2009–present
- Known for: Prague and Bahut Hua Sammaan

Ashish R. Shukla is an Indian film director and writer. He is best known for his films like Prague and Bahut Hua Sammaan.

== Early life ==
Shukla was born in Mumbai and raised in the neighbourhood of Vakola, Santacruz. Ashish worked for various ad agencies for 6 years as creative director.

== Career ==
Shukla started his journey as an assistant director to Prahlad Kakkar. He worked as creative director with Anurag Kashyap in the film Dev D.

He directed short films like The Lock and Nawazuddin Siddiqui starrer The Journey.

Shukla made his directing and writing debut with Prague. In 2020, he directed the film Bahut Hua Sammaan starring Raghav Juyal, Sanjay Mishra, Ram Kapoor and Nidhi Singh. In the same year, he directed web series Undekhi produced by Applause Entertainment & Edgestorm Ventures. In 2021, he directed web series Candy.

== Filmography ==
- Bahut Hua Sammaan
- Prague

== Web series ==
- Candy
- Undekhi
- The Pyramid Scheme
