= Deepali Pant Joshi =

Indian economist

Deepali Pant

Personal details
- Born: 12 December 1957 (age 68)
- Spouse: Rajeev Joshi
- Education: University of Allahabad
- Occupation: Banker
- Known for: Executive Director of Reserve Bank of India

Deepali Pant Joshi is a former executive director of the Reserve Bank of India (retired in 2017). She is a development economist and a writer on economic subjects. Her professional responsibilities have included the Department of Currency Management, Legal Department and Premises Department. She was the First Appellate authority under the Right to Information Act, as well as the RBI nominee on the governing council of the Institute of Banking Personnel Selection (IBPS) and director on the board of Bharatiya Reserve Bank Note Mudran Private Limited (BRBNMPL).

Joshi has also served as the RBI regional director of Rajasthan. Prior to her appointment as executive director, Joshi was responsible for Customer Service Department and Rural Planning and Credit Department.

== Early life ==
Deepali Pant Joshi studied at St. Mary's Convent Inter College, Prayagraj and at the University of Allahabad. Her father, Mr Jagdish Mohan Pant was an Advocate at the Allahabad High Court and later Administrator General and Official Trustee for the state of Uttar Pradesh. Her mother Professor Chandra Pant taught history at the University of Allahabad.

== Personal life ==
Joshi is an only child. She is married to Rajeev Joshi. They have two sons, Paritosh and Kunal.

== Career ==
Joshi is a fellow of Harvard University Asia Centre where she did post doctoral research in the areas of Finance and Economics. She holds a doctoral degree from the University of Allahabad and Law and Management degrees. She joined the Reserve Bank of India as a direct recruit in 1981 and has been with the Reserve Bank since. She has held several important professional responsibilities as Chief General Manager in charge of Urban Banks and Currency Management and administrative responsibilities at RBI Hyderabad. She was the Banking Ombudsman for the State of Andhra Pradesh and Principal, Bankers Training College and Director on the Board of Andhra Bank. Her previous professional responsibility was Chief General Manager in Charge of Rural Planning and Credit Department. She is a prolific writer and has four significant books to her credit. She renders faculty support to the College of Agricultural Banking and has lectured extensively at the IAS Academy at Mussoorie, at the Administrative Staff College, Hyderabad and at several Indian and foreign Universities. She has represented the RBI in several important International Conferences and is the India representative on the Financial Inclusion Expert Group of the G-20. Her policy interests lie in the area of welfare and development economics, law and currency management.

== Speeches ==
- Closing Remarks
- Presentation on Financial Inclusion and Financial Literacy
- Indian Financial Markets: Fuelling the Growth of the Indian Economy
- Indian Rural Banking Sector
- Reserve Bank of India at National Seminar on Consumer Protection – Agenda for Inclusive Growth
- Conference of Principal Code Compliance Officers (PCCOs) / Chairmen of Regional Rural Banks organised by BCSBI at Mumbai
- Enabling Urban Microfinance-Keynote Address by Dr Deepali Pant Joshi, Executive Director, Reserve Bank of India at the Conference on The Challenges of Enabling Urban Finance organised by Minorities Development Department, Government of Maharashtra and MAVIM the State Womens'
- Speech on Financial Inclusion
- Financial Education and Customer Protection
- Financial Education Key to Promoting Financial Inclusion and Customer Protection
- Financial Inclusion - Journey so far and Road Ahead
- NISM Conference on Ethics and Corporate Governance-Speech
- Moving Financial Capability Forward: Innovation Scale and Impact
- Financial Inclusion - The Indian Model – Challenges & Prospects-Presentation at Center for international Development- Harvard Kennedy School, Cambridge
- Strategy adopted for Financial Inclusion
- Fortifying cooperatives - efforts to strengthen the short term cooperative credit structure

== Bibliography ==
- Social Banking Promise Performance and Potential
- Employment and Poverty Alleviation Programs in India in K. K. Bagchi
- The Financial Inclusion Imperative, Cambridge Books, Cambridge University Press and a host of research articles published in journals both in India and abroad.
