= Nakul Roshan Sahdev =

Indian actor

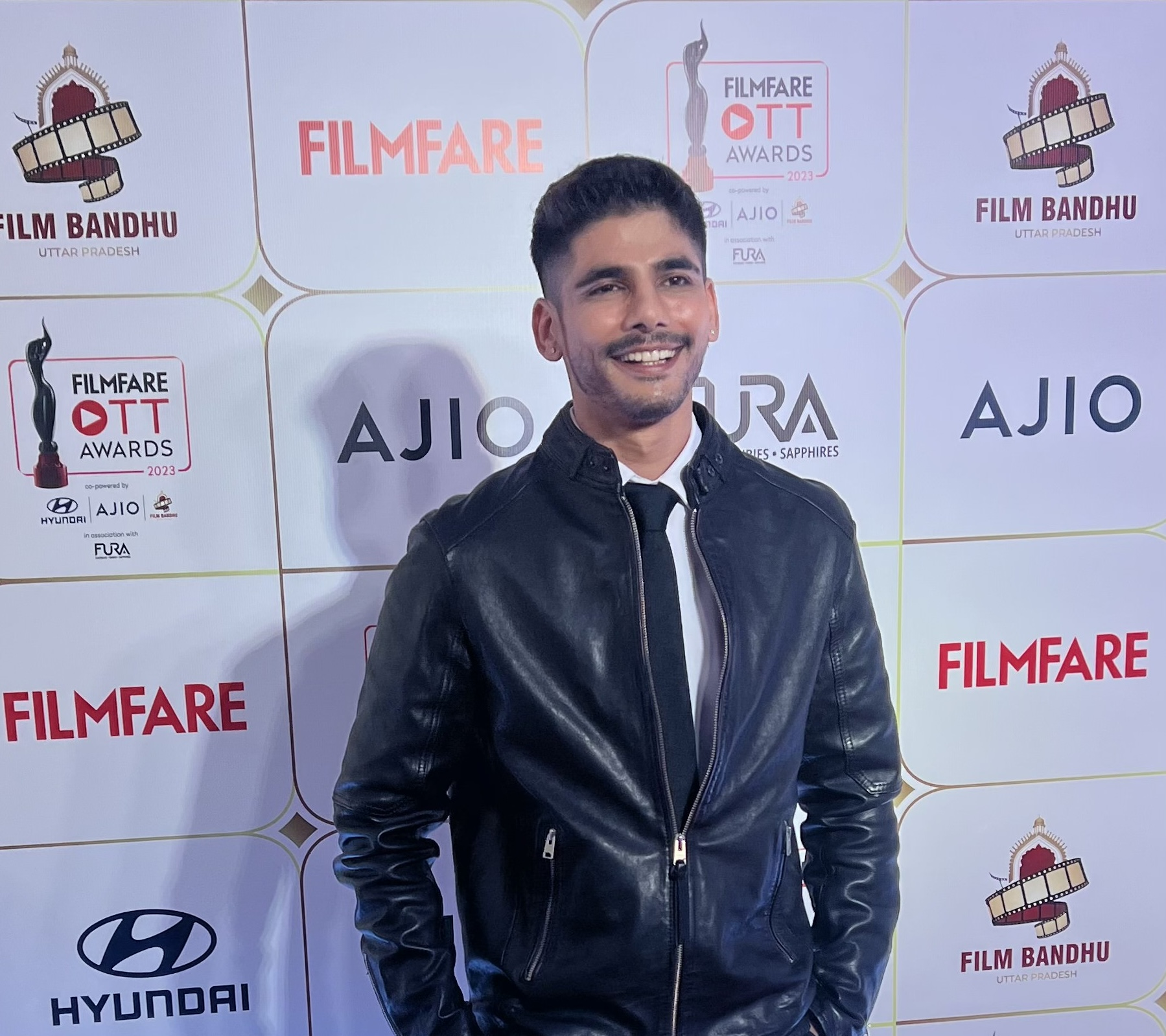
- Nakul in 2023
- Born: Udaipur, Rajasthan, India
- Education: Whistling Woods International
- Occupation: Actor
- Years active: 2011–present

Nakul Roshan Sahdev (born 5 January 1995) is an Indian actor and producer who works primarily in Hindi films, web series, and television. He is best known for his roles in the critically acclaimed films Gully Boy (2019) and Pagglait (2021), and the web series Candy (2021), for which he received a nomination at the Indian Television Academy Awards.

== Early life and education ==
Nakul Roshan Sahdev was born on 5 January 1995 in Udaipur, Rajasthan. He completed his schooling at St. Paul Sr. Secondary School in Udaipur. He subsequently enrolled in a Bachelor of Commerce Honours programme at NMIMS, Mumbai, before leaving to pursue formal acting training at Whistling Woods International.

== Career ==
=== Early career ===
In 2010, Sahdev joined Excel Entertainment, a Mumbai-based film production company. He served as an assistant casting director on the 2011 film Zindagi Na Milegi Dobara, starring Hrithik Roshan, Farhan Akhtar, Abhay Deol, and Katrina Kaif.

=== Acting debut ===
Sahdev made his acting debut as the primary antagonist in the children's television series Ishaan: Sapno Ko Awaaz De, which aired on Disney Channel India from 2010 to 2011. His film debut followed with the 2011 romance drama Mod, in which he portrayed the younger version of the lead character Andrew Raymond.

=== Films ===
Sahdev appeared as Salman in Zoya Akhtar's Gully Boy (2019), a critically acclaimed musical drama starring Ranveer Singh and Alia Bhatt, which won the Filmfare Award for Best Film in 2020.

In 2021, he played Aditya Giri in Pagglait, a dark comedy-drama released on Netflix.

He appeared as Bosco in Dange (2024), a Hindi–Tamil bilingual film produced by T-Series.

In 2025, Sahdev starred in Murderbaad, a thriller film directed by Arnab Chatterjee and distributed by Reliance Entertainment, playing dual roles as Jayesh Madnani and Jogesh Mallick.

=== Web series ===
Sahdev played Vayu Ranaut in the psychological thriller Candy (2021), released on VOOT Select, earning him a nomination for Best Actor in a Supporting Role (Drama Web) at the 21st ITA Awards.

He subsequently appeared in the thriller Girgit (2021) on ALTBalaji, portraying the character Ranbir Khetan.

In 2022, he appeared as Kisna in Aar Ya Paar (later retitled Teerandaz) on JioHotstar.

In 2025, he appeared as Ghulam in the Netflix spy thriller series Saare Jahan Se Accha: The Silent Guardians, set in 1970s India and featuring Pratik Gandhi in the lead role, released on 13 August 2025.

In 2026, Sahdev is set to appear as Jazzy in Lukkhe, a musical action drama series directed by Himank Gaur, produced by Vipul D. Shah and Rajesh Bahl under Optimystix Entertainment and White Guerrilla LLP, and set in Chandigarh. The series also stars Raashii Khanna, Palak Tiwari, and rapper King, who makes his acting debut. It is scheduled to premiere on Amazon Prime Video on 8 May 2026.

=== Production work ===
Sahdev has also worked as a producer. He produced an advertising film for the IPL team Gujarat Titans for Capri Loans, featuring cricketers Hardik Pandya, Shubman Gill, and Kane Williamson.

== Filmography ==
=== Films ===
Year	Title	Role	Notes	Ref.
2011	Mod	Young Andrew Raymond		
2019	Gully Boy	Salman	Directed by Zoya Akhtar	
2021	Pagglait	Aditya Giri	Released on Netflix	
2024	Dange	Bosco	Hindi–Tamil bilingual; produced by T-Series	
2025	Murderbaad	Jayesh Madnani / Jogesh Mallick	Distributed by Reliance Entertainment	

=== Web series ===
Year	Title	Role	Platform	Notes	Ref.
2021	Candy	Vayu Ranaut	JioHotstar		
2021	Girgit	Ranbir Khetan	ALTBalaji		
2022	Teerandaz	Kisna	JioHotstar		
2025	Saare Jahan Se Accha: The Silent Guardians	Ghulam	Netflix	Released 13 August 2025	
2026	Lukkhe	Jazzy	Amazon Prime Video	Premieres 8 May 2026	

=== Television ===
Year	Title	Role	Network	Ref.
2010–11	Ishaan	Kabir	Disney Channel India	
2013	Best Friends Forever?	Puru	Channel V India	
2014	MTV Fanaah	Anshuman	MTV India	

=== Music videos ===
Year	Title	Singer(s)	Composer	Ref.
2021	"Marjawaan"	Asees Kaur and Yasser Desai	Tanishk Bagchi	

== Awards and nominations ==
Year	Award	Category	Work	Result	Ref.
2021	21st ITA Awards	Best Actor Supporting – Drama Web	Candy	Nominated	
