= Prague (2013 film) =

- "Seeing is Misbelieving"
- Directed by: Ashish R. Shukla
- Screenplay by: Sumit Saxena, Ashish R Shukla
- Story by: Ashish R Shukla
- Produced by: Rohit Khaitan & Sunil Pathare
- Starring: Chandan Roy Sanyal; Elena Kazan; Arfi Lamba; Kumar Mayank
- Cinematography: Uday Mohite
- Edited by: Meghana Manchanda Sen
- Music by: Atif Afzal
- Production company: Glamour Struck Productions Pvt. Ltd.
- Distributed by: Glamour Struck Productions Pvt. Ltd. & Bharat Shah's-VIP Movies Ltd.
- Release date: 27 September 2013
- Running time: 109 min
- Country: India
- Languages: Hindi; English

Prague is a 2013 Hindi psychological thriller and romance film directed by Ashish R. Shukla and conceived & produced by Rohit Khaitan. The film was released on 27 September 2013. It features Chandan Roy Sanyal, Elena Kazan, Arfi Lamba and Kumar Mayank as main characters. The song "Aye Zindagi Gale Laga Le.." from the film Sadma composed by maestro Ilaiyaraja was used in the film. The film opened at Osian's 'Cinefan' for its world Premiere in New Delhi in Competition section and thereafter went to 'Tashkino' (Tashkent International Film Festival) where it premiered in official International competition section, Prague Indian Film Festival, Berlin Indian Film Festival and Dainik Jagran Film Festival before its commercial theatrical release.

== Plot ==
Prague deals with the inner conflicts of Chandan, a passionate architect who comes to Prague for a project along with his friend Gulshan whom he idolizes and wants to emulate but is also strangely scared of. In Prague, Chandan meets a gypsy girl, Elena. This girl becomes the love of his life, his inspiration and also the pain of his soul because his past from India refuses to leave him alone. Chandan's experiences have made him mistrust his own shadow and his insecurities have made his life a living hell. His only ally in his darkest times is his friend Arfie but then it is revealed that Arfie perhaps does not exist and Gulshan is an extension of Chandan himself, suggesting that it was Chandan who created these characters in his head.

== Cast ==
- Chandan Roy Sanyal
- Elena Kazan
- Arfi Lamba
- Sonia Bindra
- Kumar Mayank

== Critical response ==
Faheem Ruhani of "India Today" gave Prague 3/5 and said that "It is one man who carries the film and that man is Chandan Roy Sanyal. It is delight to see this young actor, so far restricted to playing supporting characters in mainstream films become the mainstay of this well-made, independent film. Prague is a destination worth exploring."

Anna Vetticad, a famous Indian film critic gave 3.5/5 and said "Prague is a thoroughly engaging, highly engrossing film. It demands every ounce of the viewer’s attention, but in the end it’s an intriguing, rewarding experience."

Renuka Vyavahare of Times of India gave the movie 2.5/5 and said that "If you are the type who looks for reasons and answers in a story, Prague is not for you. It doesn't have an agenda, per se, nor is it easy to comprehend."

For its music and background score, Rafat editor at Glamsham.com said "PRAGUE is intriguing and classy and there is a fine display of superb western classical with a touch of Czech and rock along with some Bollywood flavor thrown, thereby catering to all kinds of audience. 'Aye Zindagi', 'Botal Khol' and 'Chehra' are our favourites along with the excellent background scores."
