= Dange =

Dange may refer to:

People:

- Dange (surname)

Places:

- Dange Shuni, Local Government Area in Sokoto State, Nigeria
- Dange-Saint-Romain, commune in the Vienne department in the Poitou-Charentes region in western France
- Dange (Uíge province), a place in Uíge province, Angola

Rivers:

- The Dange River (now known as the Danė) which has its mouth at Memel (Klaipėda).

Film:

- Dange (film), a 2024 Indian Hindi-language film

== See also ==
- Annasaheb Dange College of Engineering & Technology, Ashta in the city of Ashta, Maharashtra, India
- Dangeau, commune in Centre-Val de Loire, France
- Dangha, village in Tombouctou, Mali
- Dangpa, a Korean pole weapon
