= Chance Pe Dance =

2010 Indian film by Ken Ghosh

- Theatrical release poster
- Directed by: Ken Ghosh
- Written by: Ken Ghosh; Nupur Asthana; Manu Rishi
- Produced by: Ronnie Screwvala
- Starring: Shahid Kapoor; Genelia D'Souza
- Narrated by: Vijay Raaz
- Cinematography: Hari K. Vedantam
- Edited by: Shaju Chandran
- Music by: Songs: Pritam; Adnan Sami; Ken Ghosh; Sandeep Shirodkar; Background Score: Sandeep Shirodkar
- Distributed by: UTV Motion Pictures
- Release date: 15 January 2010
- Running time: 158 minutes
- Country: India
- Language: Hindi
- Budget: ₹ 29 crore
- Box office: ₹ 16.3 crore

Chance Pe Dance (transl. Chance to Dance) is a 2010 Indian Hindi-language dance film starring Shahid Kapoor and Genelia D'Souza and supported by Mohnish Behl and Prince Rodde. It is directed by Ken Ghosh and produced by Ronnie Screwvala under his banner, UTV Motion Pictures. The film was released on 15 January 2010 and failed to make a mark at the box-office. The film's working title was Yahoo and another title, Star, was also considered. Also, the film was shot halfway through with Jiah Khan as the heroine, but was later replaced by Genelia D'Souza.

Indiagames also released a dance mobile video game based on the film.

== Plot ==
Sameer Behl comes to Mumbai with Bollywood dreams, struggles through the day as a courier, and keeps failing in auditions for advertisements. He refuses to accept help from his father in Delhi and is thrown out of his rented flat by the landlord. One day, a movie director named Rajeev Sharma and his assistant director see Sameer dancing and call him to the office. Soon, Sameer is signed as the male lead in Sharma's film, and his friend Tina is selected as the choreographer on the same project. Homeless, Sameer sleeps in his car and works as a dance teacher at a school. Subsequently, Sameer loses the film and grows disillusioned. Tina tells him that she also quit her job as choreographer for the film because she saw how upset he was. Sameer realises Tina loves him. Tina encourages him to participate in a television talent-hunt show, the winner of which will win the same role that Sameer was to play. Sameer enters the contest and tells Tina that he loves her. Before the final round of the competition, he discovers that his father's shop in Delhi has been demolished. Sameer promises Tina that he will come back for her and returns to Delhi to help his father. After watching Sameer's performance on TV, his father convinces him to go back to Mumbai and participate in the show. Sameer is late to the final round and is initially denied entry. However, he convinces the director to give him a chance. He wins the competition and becomes the hero of the movie "Chance Pe Dance." He is shown walking the red carpet a year later with Tina.

== Cast ==
- Shahid Kapoor as Sameer Behl (Sam), a struggling actor
- Genelia D'Souza as Tina Sharma (Choreographer)
- Mohnish Behl as Rajeev Sharma (Director)
- Prince Rodde as Bunty (Asst. Director)
- Satish Shah as Principal
- Vikas Bhalla as Gaurav Saxena
- Bikramjeet Kanwarpal as Bhutia (football coach)
- Kurush Deboo as Sameer's Landlord
- Jimmy Sharma as Purab (Model)
- Aditi Bhatia as Shanaya
- Rahul Pendkalkar
- Zain Khan as Randeep Sharma, Tina's younger brother
- Manu Rishi as Tina's Friend (Special Appearance)

== Production ==
Yahoo was the film's working title, but later, Ken Ghosh confirmed the title Chance Pe Dance in August 2009. Star was also considered, in the initial stages, but the makers rejected it as a film was released in early 2008 starring Kunal Khemu was titled Superstar.

== Soundtrack ==
Chance Pe Dance

Soundtrack album by Pritam, Adnan Sami, Sandeep Shirodkar & Ken Ghosh
- Released: 14 December 2009
- Genre: Feature film soundtrack
- Language: Hindi
- Label: T-Series

The film's soundtrack was composed by Pritam, Adnan Sami, Sandeep Shirodkar and Ken Ghosh.

=== Track listing ===
| No. | Title | Lyrics | Music | Artist(s) | Length |
|---|---|---|---|---|---|
| 1. | "Pe... Pe... Pepein...." | Kumaar | Pritam | Neeraj Shridhar, Master Saleem, Hard Kaur | 04:21 |
| 2. | "Pump It Up" | Irfaan Siddiqui | Adnan Sami Khan | Vishal Dadlani | 04:46 |
| 3. | "Pal Mein Hi" | Irfaan Siddiqui | Adnan Sami Khan | Soham Chakrabarty, Shreya Ghoshal | 04:04 |
| 4. | "One More Dance" | Irfaan Siddiqui | Adnan Sami Khan | Kunal Ganjawala, Joi Barua | 03:37 |
| 5. | "Yaba Daba Yahoo" | Irfaan Siddiqui | Adnan Sami Khan | Kunal Ganjawala | 03:56 |
| 6. | "Rishta Hai Mera" | Irfaan Siddiqui | Adnan Sami Khan | Shaan, Tulsi Kumar | 04:05 |
| 7. | "Just Do It" | Amitabh Bhattacharya | Sandeep Shirodkar, Ken Ghosh | Earl D'Souza | 01:57 |
| 8. | "Pump It Up" (Remix) | Irfaan Siddiqui | Adnan Sami Khan [Remixed By – DJ A-Myth] | Vishal Dadlani | 05:08 |
| 9. | "Pe... Pe... Pepein...." (Duet) | Kumaar | Pritam | Neeraj Shridhar, Master Saleem, Tulsi Kumar, Hard Kaur | 04:22 |
