= The Pyramid Scheme =

- Written by: Akshendra Mishra
- Directed by: Ashish R. Shukla; Shreyansh Pandey
- Starring: Shekhar Suman; Ranvir Shorey; Aanjjan Srivastav; Smita Bansal
- Country of origin: India
- Original language: Hindi
- No. of seasons: 1
- No. of episodes: 7

Production
- Camera setup: Multi-camera
- Running time: 39–46 minutes
- Production company: The Viral Fever

Original release
- Network: Amazon Prime Video
- Release: 5 June 2026

The Pyramid Scheme is a 2026 Amazon Prime Video original Hindi-language television series written by Akshendra Mishra and directed by Ashish R Shukla and Shreyansh Pandey. The series stars Paramvir Cheema, Ranvir Shorey, Aanjjan Srivastav, Shekhar Suman, Ashish Raghav, Alfiya Jafri, Akhilendra Mishra, Smita Bansal, Indresh Malik, Sushant Singh.

== Cast ==
- Paramvir Cheema as Goldy Chauhan
- Ranvir Shorey as Manoj Shrivastav
- Vijay Kumar as Chunmun Singh
- Alfia Jafry as Krittika Singh
- Ashish Raghav as Satkar
- Aanjjan Srivastav as Babu
- Shekhar Suman as Tarun Bajaj
- Smita Bansal as Pramila Singh
- Sonal Jha as Kanchan Chauhan
- Sadanand Patil AS Sunil Chauhan
- Ravi Behl as Daljeet Singh
- Akhilendra Mishra as Shantilal
- Indresh Malik as Divyajyoti
- Nischay Yadav as Gimbal
- Sameer Alam as Kanhaiyya
- Manoj Bakshi as Somnath Uncle
- Sushant Singh as Randheer Chaudhary

== Release ==
The series premiered on June 5, 2026 at Amazon Prime Video.

== Critical reception ==
The Times of India reviewer Dhaval Roy stated "The characterisations across the board are convincing," India Today reviewer Pritinanda Behera opined that the series "does slow down a bit around the middle."

Deepa Gahlot of Scroll.in writes that "The eight-part show swings wildly between farce and family melodrama, reaching the kernel of the plot rather late – how get-rich-quick swindles work, and how the perpetrators get away." Prathyush Parasuraman writing for The Hollywood Reporter India stated that "This pyramid scheme flatlines quickly, and A Silly and Soulless Stab At Scam Culture."

Abhishek Srivastava of Moneycontrol gave 3 stars out of 5 and said that "There is a good series hidden somewhere inside ‘The Pyramid Scheme.’ What appears on screen is watchable enough, but it never becomes as compelling or insightful as its premise promises. Jaya Dwivedie of India TV also rated it 3/5 stars and writes that "The Pyramid Scheme may not become a cult series like TVF's Panchayat or Gullak, but it is definitely worth watching once." Sumit Rajguru of Times Now also gave 3 stars out of 5 and said that "The Pyramid Scheme is a worthy watch for those looking for something unique and light-hearted. The series has its standout moments that are not to be missed."
