= Taylor Joy Mason =

American film and television editor

- Born: U.S.
- Occupation: Editor
- Years active: 2012–present

Taylor Joy Mason, ACE, is an American film and television editor.

== Life and career ==
Mason attended Howard University and earned a M.F.A. in editing from the American Film Institute Conservatory in 2012.

Mason began her career as an assistant editor on feature films, including Gone (2012), Blade Runner 2049 (2017), and Dune (2021). She has edited the television series Pose, Twenties, Everything's Trash, and Monster. She has also edited multiple seasons of the sketch comedy series A Black Lady Sketch Show. Her feature film credits as editor include Birth/Rebirth (2023) and Him (2025). In 2023, she operated an Avid Media Composer onstage during the presentation of the Academy Award for Best Film Editing at the 95th Academy Awards.

Mason is a member of the American Cinema Editors.

== Filmography ==
=== Film ===
- 2015 – The Heyday of the Insensitive Bastards
- 2023 – Birth/Rebirth
- 2025 – Idiotka
- 2025 – Him

=== Television ===
- 2020 – Twenties (2 Episodes)
- 2021 – Pose (2 Episodes)
- 2022 – Everything's Trash (3 Episodes)
- 2022 – Monster (2 Episodes)
- 2022-2023 – A Black Lady Sketch Show (12 Episodes)
- 2024 – The Madness (2 Episodes)

== Awards and nominations ==
Year	Result	Award	Category	Work	Ref.
2022	Won	Primetime Emmy Awards	Outstanding Picture Editing for Variety Programming	A Black Lady Sketch Show	
2023	Won	Primetime Emmy Awards	Outstanding Picture Editing for Variety Programming	A Black Lady Sketch Show	
2023	Won	American Cinema Editors	Best Edited Variety Talk/Sketch Show or Special	A Black Lady Sketch Show	
2024	Nominated	American Cinema Editors	Best Edited Variety Talk/Sketch Show or Special	A Black Lady Sketch Show	
2026	Nominated	Black Reel Awards	Outstanding Editing	Him	
