= Birth/Rebirth =

2023 film by Lee Moss

- Theatrical release poster
- Directed by: Lee Moss (Note: Credited as Laura Moss)
- Written by: Lee Moss; Brendan J. O'Brien
- Produced by: Mali Elfman; David Grove Churchill Viste
- Starring: Marin Ireland; Judy Reyes; A. J. Lister; Breeda Wool; LaChanze
- Cinematography: Chananun Chotrungroj
- Edited by: Taylor Joy Mason
- Music by: Ariel Marx
- Production companies: Shudder; Retrospecter Films; Elfman + Viste
- Distributed by: IFC Films
- Release dates: January 20, 2023 (Sundance); August 18, 2023
- Running time: 101 minutes
- Country: United States
- Language: English
- Box office: $138,617

Birth/Rebirth is a 2023 American psychological horror film directed by Lee Moss and written by Moss and Brendan J. O'Brien. The independent film stars Marin Ireland, Judy Reyes, A. J. Lister, Breeda Wool, and LaChanze.

Inspired by the 1818 novel Frankenstein by Mary Shelley, the film follows a morgue technician (Ireland) who, after successfully reanimating the body of a young girl (Lister), works together with the girl's mother (Reyes) to keep her alive. Birth/Rebirth premiered at the Sundance Film Festival on January 20, 2023, and was theatrically released in the United States by IFC Films on August 18, 2023, to positive reviews from critics.

== Plot ==
Dr. Rose Casper is a forensic pathologist and recluse who prefers the company of cadavers from the morgue to social interaction. She finds the idea of female biological reproduction distasteful, but is obsessed with its clinical processes, gestating materials in her own body in order to discover a way to bring the dead back to life.

Celie Morales is a maternity nurse and single mother whose life revolves around her precocious five-year-old daughter, Lila. Efficient and empathetic, she is passionate about helping women give birth in an environment where they feel empowered and listened to.

The worlds of these two women collide when Lila dies suddenly and ends up on Rose's autopsy table. The circumstances of the little girl's death make her the perfect human candidate for Rose's next experiment.

When Lila's body disappears from the hospital, Celie begins to suspect that Rose is to blame. She forces her way into Rose's Co-op City apartment and discovers her daughter, reanimated in a home lab but just barely clinging to life. Rose's experiment has worked. She's brought Lila back from the dead. The treatment however, is highly experimental, and the little girl's continued recovery is anything but certain.

Both women realize they will need to draw on each other's very different expertise in order to keep Lila alive.

== Cast ==
- Marin Ireland as Rose
- Judy Reyes as Celie
- A. J. Lister as Lila
- Breeda Wool as Emily
- Monique Gabriela Curnen as Rita
- Grant Harrison as Scott
- LaChanze as Colleen
- Rina Mejia as Pauline

== Production ==
Lee Moss devised a story concept based on their obsession with Mary Shelley's 1818 novel Frankenstein in the early 2000s. Moss began a first draft of 60 pages consisting of mainly imagery and story ideas. Brendan J. O'Brien, their long-time writing partner, then outlined the plot and wrote the second draft. Moss explained to Filmmaker, "That tends to be how we work: his drafts are too long, my drafts are too short. We bat scenes back and forth, and by the end of the process, we don't even remember who touched what. We're very much married by the end of it". In 2018, Cinestate became briefly involved with the project, but the sides would spilt due to creative differences. In 2020, the script was selected to participate in the Sundance Institute Screenwriters Lab. That same year, Moss met with Emily Gotto of Shudder, who Moss has credited with having "really championed the film" and securing financing. Soon after, Marin Ireland was cast in one of the lead roles, an event Moss believed "catapulted the project forward". The project was greenlit in March 2020 but all work was halted by the onset of the COVID-19 pandemic.

The film was reported by Deadline Hollywood to be in production by September 2022, with Moss set to make their feature directorial debut. Principal photography took place in New Jersey and the Co-op City area of New York City from August to late September 2022. The cartoon Rescue Birds, which appears on screen several times was created specifically for the film. The filmmakers had wanted to use the popular children's cartoon Wonder Pets! instead, but no permission was granted with Moss saying, "We wanted a real TV series, Wonder Pets! and the good folks at Wonder Pets! never called us back, because they wanted nothing to do with this movie..."

== Release ==
Birth/Rebirth premiered at the 2023 Sundance Film Festival on January 20, 2023, and was screened at the Fantasia International Film Festival on July 31, 2023. The film was released in theaters in the United States by IFC Films on August 18, 2023, and began streaming on Shudder on November 10, 2023.

=== Critical reception ===
On the review aggregator website Rotten Tomatoes, 96% of 96 critics' reviews are positive, with an average rating of 7.5/10. The website's consensus reads: "Firmly rooted in classic horror, Birth/Rebirth uses a familiar framework to tease at fundamental fears from a chillingly relatable angle." Metacritic, which uses a weighted average, assigned the film a score of 78 out of 100, based on 17 critics, indicating "generally favorable" reviews.

Jessica Kiang from Variety called it "a clever, provocative new take on a horror classic" and said "Ireland and Reyes breathe new life into a literary touchstone in director Lee Moss' drolly disturbing biological horror". Jordan Mintzer writing for The Hollywood Reporter gave the film a positive review saying, "Not for the fainthearted, this twisted if not exactly terrifying feature takes some cues from Stuart Gordon's 1985 cult flick Re-Animator, as well as from classics like Dracula and Frankenstein, in its grisly portrayal of two women resurrecting a little girl's dead corpse in the name of science and love". He also compared the story's concept to David Cronenberg's Crimes of the Future and the Alien films but elaborated, "Moss tackles the idea from a more intimate and feminist perspective, questioning how far mothers are willing to go for their children, or simply to become mothers at all".

IndieWire's David Ehrlich gave the film a poor rating of a "C-". He also compared the film to Cronenberg's work but stated that Moss missed the "detail and commitment that allows those films to sink into your skin". The New York Times's Jeannette Catsoulis named it a "Critic's Pick" writing, "Motherhood is both mad and monstrous in Birth/Rebirth, Lee Moss's ultrasmart, ferociously feminist take on the Frankenstein myth...as the women's behavior grows ever more shocking Moss offers no rebuke to their heedless amorality. There is only the audience to judge."

=== Awards and nominations ===
On December 5, 2023, the film was nominated for three Independent Spirit Awards, including Best Lead Performance for Reyes and Best Screenplay.

== See also ==
- Frankenstein in popular culture
- Gender in horror films
- List of films about women's issues
- Technological resurrection
