= Shinaakht =

Indian short film

- Directed by: Pragyesh Singh
- Written by: Pragyesh Singh
- Produced by: Pragyesh Singh
- Starring: Raju Kher; Shishir Sharma; Shakti Singh; Navni Parihar; Stefy Patel; Arfi Lamba; Bikramjeet Kanwarpal; Krishna Bhatt
- Cinematography: Subhransu Das
- Edited by: Himanshu Rastogi
- Music by: Sajjad Ali Chandwani
- Distributed by: TNV Films
- Release date: 1 November 2018
- Running time: 40 Minutes
- Country: India
- Language: Hindi

Shinaakht (transl. Identification) is an Indian Hindi-language short film directed, written and produced by Pragyesh Singh under the banner of TNV Films. The film stars Raju Kher, Shishir Sharma, Shakti Singh, Navni Parihar, Arfi Lamba, Stefy Patel, Bikramjeet Kanwarpal and Krishna Bhatt. The film is based on Circumcision which challenges Male genital mutilation (MGM) and Female genital mutilation (FGM) as per Islamic Law.

Shinaakht premiered in Gorakhpur, Hisar, Raipur, Jamshedpur, Allahabad, as part of the Jagran Film Festival in August and September 2019.

The film has been selected and screened in the several National and International film festivals including Crownwood International Film Festival, Delhi Film Festival, Apulia Web Fest, Italy KinoDUEL International Film Festival, England, International Short Film Festival Pune Films Infest (New York City), L'Age d'Or International Art-house Film Festival and Ploiesti International Film Festival, Romania.

== Plot ==
The story of the film shows a close relationship between a father named Liaqat Ali (Shishir Sharma) and his two kids named Idrish (son, played by Arfi Lamba) and Sofiya (daughter, played by Stefy Patel). As per the religious customs in Islam, both were circumcised at the age of 8 and 9 as respectively. On attaining Adult age, Idrish (Arfi Lamba) and Sofiya (Stefy Patel) filed a case against their father, Liaqat Ali (Shishir Sharma), Maulvi Muhammad Basheer (Raju Kher) and Zarra Jumman Miyan, an illiterate, who performed circumcisions. The case was registered as per the provision of the Indian Medical Council Act, 1956, the Protection of Children from Sexual Offences (POCSO) Act, 2012 and Section 326 and 326A of the Indian Penal Code. When matters were brought to the Mumbai High Court, Liaqat Ali (Shishir Sharma) took their children's side and supported them and the Constitutional laws of India.

Liaqat Ali (Shishir Sharma) was not willing to undergo the circumcision of his children but he was pressurised by Maulana Muhammad Basheer, who explained Liaqat Ali (Shishir Sharma) that it is mandatory for Muslims to undergo circumcision or else they cannot be treated as Muslims. Liaqat realised that it was his fault when he faces the facts that circumcision was carried out in medically unhygienic conditions by an unprofessional person, which affected the kids seriously and they suffered from health issues. Later, Liaqat learns that circumcision as identification of religion is nowhere mentioned in the holy book Quran and found that it isn't a mandatory practice as per the religion.

== Cast ==
- Raju Kher as Maulvi Sahab
- Shishir Sharma as Liaqat Ali
- Shakti Singh as Prosecutor
- Navni Parihar as Razia
- Arfi Lamba as Idrish
- Stefy Patel as Sofiya
- Bikramjeet Kanwarpal as Syed Qadri
- Krishna Bhatt as Jumman Miya
- Rajendra Mehra as Senior Maulana

== Accolades ==
| Award ceremony | Category | Result | Ref. |
|---|---|---|---|
| Crownwood International Film Festival | Indian short film | Won | |
| Delhi Film Festival Award Ceremony by Jaipur International Film Festival | Short Fiction | Nominated | |
| Eurasia International Monthly Film Festival | Best Short (under 52 min) | Won | |
| International Shorts Film Festival, Melbourne | Best Short, Best drama | Won | |
| Indie Visions Film Festival | Best Short, Best drama | Won | |
| Penzance International Film Festival, England | Best Short Film, Best Story & Best Actor Award to Arfi Lamba | Won | |
| LA Edge film awards | Best Editing | Won | |
| CKF International Film Festival | Best Feature of the Month | Won | |
| Under The Stars International Film Festival | Best Short | Won | |

== See also ==
- List of Hindi films
- Female genital mutilation in India
- Circumcision in Islam
- List of films about women's issues
- Genital modification and mutilation
