= Candy (Indian TV series) =

- Genre: Crime, Thriller
- Written by: Agrim Joshi, Debojit Das Purkayastha
- Directed by: Ashish R. Shukla
- Starring: Ronit Roy; Richa Chadha; Gopal Datt; Nakul Roshan Sahdev; Manu Rishi Chadha; Riddhi Kumar
- Country of origin: India
- Original language: Hindi
- No. of seasons: 1
- No. of episodes: 8

Production
- Producers: Ashwin Varde; Rajesh Bahl; Shashi Shekhar; Vipul D. Shah
- Camera setup: Multi-camera
- Running time: 39
- Production companies: Optimystix Entertainment India, Wakaoo Films

Original release
- Network: Voot
- Release: 8 September 2021

Candy is an Indian crime thriller streaming television series written by Agrim Joshi and Debojit Das Purkayastha, and directed by Ashish R. Shukla. It stars Ronit Roy, Richa Chadha, Gopal Datt, Manu Rishi Chadha and Riddhi Kumar in lead roles. The series was released on Voot on 8 September 2021.

== Cast ==
Cast credited from sources includes:

- Ronit Roy as Jayant Parekh
- Richa Chadha as DSP Ratna Sankhwar
- Gopal Datt as Headmaster Thomas
- Manu Rishi Chadha as Money Ranaut
- Riddhi Kumar as Kalki Rawat
- Mihir Ahuja as Mehul Awasthi
- Mikhael Kantroo as Luka
- Nakul Roshan Sahdev as Vayu Ranaut
- Sonal Panvar as Binny Parekh
- Ayesha Kaduskar as Sahiba Joshi
- Durgesh Kumar as Lambodhar Bisht
- Raj Sharma as Atmanath
- Vijayant Kohli as Father Markus
- Akash Mahamana as SI Shyam Pandey
- Aditya Nanda as Sanjay Sonowal
- Anju Alva Naik as Sonalika Parekh
- Abbas Ali Ghaznavi as John Dhakar
- Bodhisattva Sharma as Imran Ahmed
- Pawan Kumar Singh as Naresh Rawat
- Shivangi Singh as Lina Nagalia
- Prasanna Bisht as Ritika Sahay

== Plot ==
The series is about mysteries and secrets of Rudrakund where a student Mehul was killed and Jayant Parekh (Ronit Roy) sees that school students are addicted to drugged candy made in Ranaut's factory. Parekh gets involved in the investigation with DSP Ratna Sankhwar (Richa Chadha).

== Episodes ==
No.	Title	Directed by	Written by	Original release date
1	"Hope in the Darkness"	Ashish R. Shukla	Agrim Joshi, Debojit Das Purkayastha	September 8, 2021
2	"The Outsider"	Ashish R. Shukla	Agrim Joshi, Debojit Das Purkayastha	September 8, 2021
3	"The Rage of Rudrakund"	Ashish R. Shukla	Agrim Joshi, Debojit Das Purkayastha	September 8, 2021
4	"Old Sins"	Ashish R. Shukla	Agrim Joshi, Debojit Das Purkayastha	September 8, 2021
5	"Predators, Prayers, Sacrifices"	Ashish R. Shukla	Agrim Joshi, Debojit Das Purkayastha	September 8, 2021
6	"End of the Line"	Ashish R. Shukla	Agrim Joshi, Debojit Das Purkayastha	September 8, 2021
7	"The Heir of Misfortunes"	Ashish R. Shukla	Agrim Joshi, Debojit Das Purkayastha	September 8, 2021
8	"The Masaan"	Ashish R. Shukla	Agrim Joshi, Debojit Das Purkayastha	September 8, 2021

== Reception ==
The Indian Express wrote "Candy is a pulpy murder mystery that has the potential to create an engaging storyline but the over-the-top drama that's at play here might put off some audience members." The Times of India rated 3 out of 5 stars and wrote "Candy has some good performances and unpredictable twists. Nakul Roshan Sahdev as Vayu Ranaut in particular deserves a mention for his portrayal of a troubled son craving for love. The hills have eyes and creators Debojit Das Purkayastha and Agrim Joshi craft the thriller well."

Scroll.in praised Ronit Roy and Richa Chadha's acting and wrote "Ronit Roy and Richa Chadha turn out committed performances, but fare better in the rare sombre scenes in which they are permitted to have a moment to themselves." News18 wrote "Candy is an engaging thriller from start to finish, with twists you cannot predict. There is a very cool Gone Girl style shift in narration, where we find out that everything that we have known so far has been a lie. However, since they have a solid climax in place, there was no need for so many twists in the first place."

Pinkvilla wrote "Candy is a well-made murder mystery that rides on the towering performances of Ronit Roy and Richa Chadha with an element of unpredictability towards the end." Lehren wrote "Spread over eight episodes are a Thai connection, grave lines from Jayant Parekh on Sermons vs Science, a crude fallout between the Ranauts with father and son hurling filthy abuse at each other, and a few more killings with “Sirji” orchestrating it."
