= Abhay (TV series) =

Indian web series

- Official poster
- Genre: Psychological fiction Crime; Thriller
- Developed by: B. P. Singh
- Written by: Alka Shukla; Vaspar Dandiwala; Pushaan Mukherjee; Ankana Joshi; Sushant Shukla; Srinivas Abrol; Sudhanshu Sharma; Priya Saggi; Smita P. Mukherjee; Aparna Nadig; Shubham Sharma; Deeptak Das
- Directed by: Ken Ghosh
- Starring: Kunal Khemu; Sandeepa Dhar; Elnaaz Norouzi; Asha Negi; Ram Kapoor; Nidhi Singh; Chunky Pandey; Raghav Juyal; Asheema Vadaan; Bidita Bag
- Music by: Ajay Singha
- Country of origin: India
- Original language: Hindi
- No. of seasons: 3
- No. of episodes: 24

Production
- Producer: B. P. Singh
- Cinematography: Hari K. Vedantam
- Editor: Mukesh Thakur
- Running time: Approx. 35 minutes
- Production companies: Fiction Factory Productions; Essel Vision Productions Ltd.

Original release
- Network: ZEE5
- Release: 7 February 2019 – present

Abhay is a ZEE5 Original Indian Hindi-language psychological crime thriller web series. Produced by B. P. Singh under Fiction Factory Productions, and directed by Ken Ghosh, the series marks the digital debut of Bollywood actor Kunal Khemu, who stars alongside Elnaaz Norouzi, Sandeepa Dhar and Namit Das. The series revolves around officer Abhay Pratap Singh, an investigating officer with the mind of a criminal, who can go to any extent to solve a case. The first season comprised eight episodes and was released on ZEE5 on 7 February 2019.

Abhay 2 saw returning as the protagonist while Ram Kapoor and Chunky Pandey were seen playing the antagonist in the series. Besides them, the second season also stars Bidita Bag, Raghav Juyal, Indraneil Sengupta and Asheema Vadaan. Abhay 2 is produced by B.P. Singh, and directed by Ghosh was released on the same OTT platform on 14 August 2020.

Season 3, which released on ZEE5 on 8 April 2022, sees the stakes getting higher with Abhay facing a new unknown threat. Kunal Kemmu plays Abhay Pratap Singh with admirable composure in the eight-part crime thriller.

== Season 1 ==
The story revolves around the life of SP Abhay Pratap Singh, who solves different cases along with his team, which includes Inspector Komal and other officers. He has a son named Saahil towards whom Abhay is overprotective due to Abhay's past which includes officer Natasha and her informer Govind. Govind is back to take revenge from Abhay who was the reason behind Govind's family's death. Will Abhay be able to solve all the cases? Or will he lose to Govind's quest for vengeance?

== Season 2 ==
Set within a year of the events of the first season, Abhay continues to hunt vile murderers and monsters with his trademark ingenuity and novel deductions until an enigmatic criminal mastermind, with no name or past, turns his world upside down and traps him along with everyone else in a maze that will test the very fibre of Abhay's morality. He plays the villain's game better than the villain could have expected but still the game does what it is meant to. The Villain lies & tries to corrupt Abhay. It starts getting to Abhay, the pressure of saving the kids and his past secrets make him vulnerable, but even by the end he remains incorruptible.

== Season 3 ==
Season 3 is about Abhay facing a new threat, a force capable of exploiting anyone in the name of a belief. Abhay must now crackdown on more than just criminality. Abhay is in a mess of his own life and struggles with past setbacks. Abhay the hunter and hunted in his third coming. This makes him even more fascinating.

== Cast ==
=== Main (Season 1) ===
- Kunal Khemu as SP Abhay Pratap Singh
- Sandeepa Dhar as Inspector Komal
- Elnaaz Norouzi as Officer Natasha
- Namit Das as Govind
- Priyal Gor as Divya Singh (Abhay's wife)
- Maninee Mishra as Radhika

=== Main (Season 2) ===
- Kunal Khemu as Superintendent of Police Abhay Pratap Singh; Sonam Khanna's boyfriend
- Asha Negi as Sonam Khanna (news reporter); Abhay Pratap Singh's girlfriend
- Ram Kapoor as Kidnapper - dead (bomb blast)
- Nidhi Singh as Khushboo
- Chunky Pandey as Harsh
- Asheema Vadaan as Mira
- Bidita Bag as Saloni

=== Main (Season 3) ===
- Kunal Khemu as Abhay
- Vijay Raaz as Mrityu
- Asha Negi as Sonam
- Rahul Dev as Avtar
- Tanuj Virwani as Kabir
- Divya Agarwal as Harleen
- Nidhi Singh as Khushboo
- Vidya Malvade as Nidhi

=== Recurring ===
- Raghav Juyal as Sameer
- Manini Mishra as Radhika
- Rituraj Singh as Kuldeep Dhingra (KD)
- Pratyaksh Panwar as Saahil
- Devendar Chaudhury as Sandeep Awasthi
- Nitish Pandey as Pandey Ji
- Mukesh Rishi as Babu Bhaiyya (Episode 5 and 6)
- Harsh Mayar as Sujay (Episode 5 and 6)
- Naved Aslam as Senior Officer (Episode 5 and 6)
- Prashant Narayanan as Jaykrishan (Episode 7 and 8)
- Saurabh Nayyar as Forensic Expert (Episode 7 and 8)
- Geetanjali Mishra as Salini
- Imran Nazir Khan as DJ Yoko
- Ahmad Harhash as Raj Singh Verma

== Episodes ==
Series	Episodes	Originally released
1	8	7 February 2019
2	8	14 August 2020
3	8	8 April 2022

=== Season 1 ===
No. overall	No. in season	Title	Directed by	Written by	Original release date
1	1	"Bagged and Tagged"	Ken Ghosh	Aparna Nadig and Sudhanshu Sharma	7 February 2019
Angry group of people set fire to a woman in daylight in the village of Chinthari. Abhay Pratap Singh (Kunal Khemu) is handed over a case of children getting lost in Chinthari. He and his team visit the local police of Chinthari and get to know that Payal, a girl and Raghu and Pooja, brother and sister were last kidnapped. A man around age 40, Rawat comes and takes Pooja to the bathroom of another man's house, Chander Singh who is drinking and watching T.V. After some Rawat comes out of the bathroom and takes a chopper and cuts Pooja, who is raped by him earlier in pieces and starts cooking. The local police station's officer, Srivastav tells that Pooja's phone was sold by Jaggu, a thief to someone. Abhay tells his team to find Jaggu before he comes the next day. At his home, he prepares soup for his son and calls his team to know about the progress but scolds the in-charge Komal (Sandeepa Dhar) as she is not able to find Jaggu. It is shown that Abhay is overprotective towards his son and has fixed CCTV cameras to keep an eye on him 24x7. When Abhay is about to sleep, he sees that someone is kidnapping his son, Saahil. He runs towards Saahil's room but sees that he is sleeping quietly. Abhay walks towards Saahil's room and sees his throat being cut by a woman of the same age as Abhay and then Abhay wakes up in his bed scared. The next day he continues the investigation and finds from a shopkeeper whose shop is opposite Raghu and Pooja's school that he saw Raghu and Pooja last with one of their friends. He visits Raghu and Pooja's home and looks at some photos. Caretaker of Saahil, Radhika calls Abhay and tells him to come 2–3 hours early as she has to go for her mother's operation. Abhay then goes to Raghu and Pooja's friend's home and asks some questions about him. Before leaving he observes a toy kept beside the friend. Then he stays close to his house. A man visits the house who is none other than Rawat. Abhay follows him and reaches Chander Singh's house. He goes in and holds Rawat at gunpoint and asks the whereabouts of Raghu and Pooja. He tells Rawat that he saw the same toy at his house which was in Raghu's hand in the photo at Raghu's home. Rawat tries to defend but Abhay starts searching the house. Rawat and Chander Singh try to stop him but Abhay searches and finds Raghu lying in the garage. Rawat from behind hits rod on Abhay's head but he single-handedly manages to defeat both of them. The rest of the team comes and stop Abhay from beating Chander Singh to death. Rawat then tells them the whereabouts of other dead bodies. Radhika calls Abhay and asks whether he has given Saahil medicines or not to which Abhay gets shocked and drives towards his home. He checks the CCTV and sees that they are not working. When he reaches home he sees Saahil playing with the same women which he saw in his dream, Abhay takes out his gun and points towards the women.
2	2	"Who is the Daddy now?"	Ken Ghosh	Aparna Nadig and Sudhanshu Sharma	27 February 2019
A man in his 30's visits the government office and asks for his mother's pension. When the officer asked why has he not brought his mother with him, we see another story where he gets furious when his mother calls him a mouse. He hits his mother with a cooker in his head. At the office, he tells the officer that she is severely ill. When the officer asks why has he not brought his father then, we again see the past in which he hits his father with the same pressure cooker after his father sees his wife's body. The officer gives the pension and warns them to bring someone with him next time. We again see the past in which a boy named Pramod mixing cement and pouring it all over his parents' bodies. Abhay who is holding the woman named Natasha at gunpoint tells her to leave home as soon as possible. While going she tells Abhay that Govind attacked her in jail and also he is back to take revenge from him. The case is handed over to Abhay in which a girl named Surbhi is kidnapped. According to the file, Surbhi was going to New York from Delhi. Abhay sees that she uploaded photos of her from New York but finds out that these images are google images which means that she never reached Delhi to catch her flight. In the parallel story, we see Pramod treating Surbhi like his pet and then licks her face. Abhay calls an old hacker, Pandey as he thinks that it would take much more time to get approval from an agency for hacking. In a parallel story, Pramod plays with Surbhi a game in which she has to recognize an animal acted by Pramod. When Surbhi is failed is recognizing one of them he asks what she thought it was. When she says that she thought it was a mouse he strangles her to death with a chain from which she was tied. Pramod brings one more girl from the brothel and treats him the same as Surbhi. Pandey with on Surbhi's mobile by hacking and traces the location which is Pramod's house. Abhay and his team find the dead bodies of Pramod's parents inside a bed covered in cement. Whereas Pramod orders food from a restaurant. Pandey hacks Pramod's laptop and uses its camera as CCTV. Abhay notices the box of the hotel from where Pramod ordered the food. He gets all the address where the food was delivered that day. The team starts searching at all address. Abhay and Komal reach the hotel where Pramod is staying. Komal enters the room and engages in a fight with Pramod. Komal gets an upper hand on Pramod but Pramod pushes her into the pool of cement. Abhay comes from behind saves Komal and beats Pramod. When Pramod falls in a pool of cement, Abhay creates a fake story so that no-one would know that he killed Pramod. Abhay has put a man behind Natasha so that he could know everything about her whereabouts. He tells Abhay that someone attacked Natasha and Natasha fought back by shooting him in his left hand.
3	3	"Swipe Right"	Ken Ghosh	Aparna Nadig and Sudhanshu Sharma	10 March 2019
A young girl named Supriya is getting ready and smoking in her house. She checks her mobile where she sees Abhay's profile on the finger app and swipes right's him. Abhay with his team visits the forensic lab with his team where the forensic scientist gives him information about the hands and legs separated from the body. He orders his team to find the other body parts and calls the man who is searching for Govind. The man tells him the whereabouts of him. When Abhay reaches the place Govind is already gone. In Saahil's school, a man with a scar on his head is tying Saahil's shoelaces. Radhika comes and takes Saahil back. The man tells Radhika that he is Abhay's friend when she asks him his, he gets disappeared. Radhika tells this to Abhay, on which Abhay calls the man which he has put behind Govind to find him as soon as possible. The story gets in 2017 where Supriya and another man are having sex. Just after they finish Supriya shouts for help and a boy and beats the man with a bat. Supriya cut the man's throat and another boy, Rohit cuts the man to pieces. They take the body in a bag and throw it somewhere. Supriya takes the mobile and deletes the account from which she met the man. Back in the present Abhay notices a birthmark on one of the victim's hands from which they get to know about the victims family. They visit the victim's office and get to know that he used to drink a lot, consume drugs and used to take one girl to the pub. At the pub, Abhay gets the girls to sketch drawn from the owner as he was the victim's friend. Abhay also gets to know that the girl used a finger dating app to meet the victim. We again see in past where Supriya brings a fat man to her house where she, Rohit and other guy kill him and take his money. This is done by them 2-3 times. At present Pandey explains the features of the Finger dating app to Abhay and tells him that the killers create an account when they need the money and search for the wealthy victim on the app when they are done killing him and taking all the money, they delete the account. Abhay instructs him to make an account and tells ladies to make a fake male account. He tells Pandey to make one for him and post some photos which will show that he is very rich. Supriya and Rohit decide to hunt another man as they are in need of money she makes an account and right swipes Abhay. Abhay gets the notification and tells his team. He then meets her in the same pub. Supriya consumes some drugs and tells Abhay to take some. Supriya gets distracted by some girls nearby meanwhile Abhay throws the drugs away buts shows that he took the drugs. She takes him to his house and gives him a drink. Abhay drinks a sip and goes unconscious. Rohit comes and sees Abhay from near. Abhay suddenly spits the drink on Rohit and manages to take down Supriya, Rohit and another guy single-handedly. Govind calls Abhay and sings a song for him.
4	4	"Cyanide Poisoning"	Ken Ghosh	Aparna Nadig and Sudhanshu Sharma	27 March 2019
An Aghori starts sex with a dead body in a jungle. Police inspector Srivastav and his group come and run behind him to catch him. He runs faster and reaches his group. They take everyone to the Police station to take a test of DNA. Suddenly one of Aghori falls on the floor and starts rubbing his penis and says that his penis is burning. CTF minister questions Abhay for his way of catching the killers as his video of severely beating a man on the roadside goes viral. Till the case on him will start he in on duty but once the case is started he will be suspended. Officer Natasha now a reporter makes a report in the newspaper defending Abhay on beating the man on the roadside. Abhay calls her and thanks to her and tells her that she can now visit his home anytime to meet Sahil. Abhay is handed over the case of a Cyanide killer who kills his victims using Cyanide. Abhay then goes to the station where the Aghori's are locked up. The forensic scientist there tells that the Aghori who was rubbing his penis was the one to rape the women. But Abhay objects and says that if he was killed and knew what happens when cyanide touches his penis then he would never have had sex with the body. He says that the death scene is different and the killer is also someone else. Abhay and his team then go to the victim's house and ask some questions. The victim's father-in-law tells her that she went wearing bridal clothes and jewellery. We see in another story that a woman visits a temple where a woman asks about her to which she says she wants a child. The women tell her to come in bridal clothes and wearing jewellery the same night in the jungle. The woman and his other associate get the set ready and make laddoos with potassium cyanide in it.
5	5	"Crossfire"	Ken Ghosh	Aparna Nadig and Sudhanshu Sharma	16 April 2019
The story takes us back to Abhay's past which explains his current paranoia. Meanwhile, a dissatisfied teenager goes on a killing spree.
6	6	"Burn"	Ken Ghosh	Aparna Nadig and Sudhanshu Sharma	16 April 2019
Abhay's relationship with Natasha begins to hinder the investigation of the killer. Will Abhay be able to solve the murder cases?
7	7	"The Butcher"	Ken Ghosh	Aparna Nadig and Sudhanshu Sharma	30 April 2019
A butcher from Uttar Pradesh slaughters people and flings their body parts in different areas of the town. A lack of evidence and clues make this a tough case to crack. Will Abhay be able to catch this butcher or will he get trapped in Govind's vicious plan?
8	8	"48 Hours"	Ken Ghosh	Aparna Nadig and Sudhanshu Sharma	1 May 2019
Abhay has 48 hours to find the killer. Will he find the butcher? Will Natasha help Abhay in hunting for the killer?

=== Season 2 ===
No. overall	No. in season	Title	Directed by	Written by	Original release date
9	1	"Brain Soup"	Ken Ghosh	Aparna Nadig and Sudhanshu Sharma	14 August 2020
As students in Lucknow start going missing, the STF team headed by Abhay starts probing the case. Their investigation leads them to a twisted serial killer. Meanwhile, a school bus is taken hostage by a peculiar looking person.
10	2	"One-Legged Skeleton"	Ken Ghosh	Aparna Nadig and Sudhanshu Sharma	14 August 2020
The dead body of sub-inspector Maninder Singh is found in a canal with a missing foot. Abhay's inquiry leads him to Saloni, a sex worker.
11	3	"The Game Begins"	Ken Ghosh	Aparna Nadig and Sudhanshu Sharma	14 August 2020
Abhay learns about the hijacking of the school bus through Sonam, a reporter who is pursuing the case of the missing children and bashing the police force for its inability to track down the hijackers. Abhay receives a hint towards the location of the kid.
12	4	"The 12-Hour Challenge"	Ken Ghosh	Aparna Nadig and Sudhanshu Sharma	4 September 2020
Abhay meets the Villain who challenges him into a game in exchange for information on the missing kids. The mastermind leads Abhay to the case of missing women and dares him to solve the case in 12 hours to get the location of one of the missing kids.
13	5	"Misplaced Retribution"	Ken Ghosh	Aparna Nadig and Sudhanshu Sharma	4 September 2020
Abhay manages to locate the kid the Villain had led him to. The Villain once again promises to give Abhay the location details of two more kids if he can nab the murderer of a couple that was killed in a car crash in 48 hours.
14	6	"The Homophobic Killer"	Ken Ghosh	Aparna Nadig and Sudhanshu Sharma	29 September 2020
A homophobic killer brutally murders two young men and broadcasts the news of their murders on the radio. At the vigil held for the victims, the killer strikes again and murders two more men. The killer's next plan can lead to the loss of thousands of lives.
15	7	"A Tougher Challenge"	Ken Ghosh	Aparna Nadig and Sudhanshu Sharma	29 September 2020
Abhay manages to save a child, but the information is leaked to the press. The Villain shows Abhay an article about the murder of the two young men and orders him to find the killer in 12 hours.
16	8	"The Final Trap"	Ken Ghosh	Aparna Nadig and Sudhanshu Sharma	29 September 2020
The Villain manages to escape and kills the accused in the missing women's case in police custody. He then threatens to kill the accused in the car crash case next. Meanwhile, Abhay reaches the house where he had an incident with Sonam and discovers that the Villain has set up another challenge for him. But this time, Abhay manages to set the Villain up in his trap.

== Controversy ==
The Abhay 2 web series, starring Kunal Khemu in the lead, became a controversial one for showing Indian Bengali freedom fighter Khudiram Bose, as a ‘criminal’ in one of its episode. Netizens had criticized the makers of the web series for disrespecting him.

Zee5 apologized after using Bose's photograph on a criminal board in the web series Abhay 2.
