= Murderbaad =

Indian Hindi-language romantic-thriller film

- Directed by: Arnab Chatterjee
- Written by: Arnab Chatterjee
- Produced by: Arnab Chatterjee
- Starring: Nakul Roshan Sahdev; Kanikka Kapur; Sharib Hashmi; Manish Chaudhari; Saloni Batra
- Cinematography: Binod Pradhan
- Edited by: Dev Rao Jadhav
- Music by: Rickie
- Production company: ACJEE Entertainment
- Distributed by: Reliance Entertainment
- Release date: 18 July 2025
- Country: India
- Language: Hindi

Murderbaad is a 2025 Indian Hindi-language romantic-thriller film directed and produced by Arnab Chatterjee starring Nakul Roshan Sahdev and Kanikka Kapur in the lead roles. It is released on 18 July 2025.

== Cast ==
- Nakul Roshan Sahdev as Jayesh Madnani/Jogesh Mallick
- Kanikka Kapur as Isabelle Sharma
- Sharib Hashmi as Maqsood Ghaziabadi
- Manish Chaudhari as Suryakant Maheshwari
- Manish Khanna as Sabbir Jalan
- Saloni Batra as Shaili Pandey
- Amole Gupte as Biresh
- Aanjjan Srivastav as Ashok Gupta
- Masood Akhtar as Anwar Alam
- Subrat Dutta as Inspector Das
- Barun Chanda as Sukanto Bandopadhyay
- Vibha Chibber as Nirmala
- Uday Tikekar as Commissioner Kumar
- Ravina Sharma as Aditia Rawat
- Kamaleswar Mukherjee as SP Bakshi

== Release ==
The film is released on 18 July 2025.

== Reception ==
Archika Khurana of The Times of India gave 2.5 stars out of 5 and said that "Murderbaad is an earnest attempt from a first-time director, and Arnab Chatterjee deserves credit for crafting a story that, despite its flaws, keeps the viewer curious." Titas Chowdhury of News18 rated 3/5 stars and said that "Murderbaad is not for everyone. It’s too quiet for those expecting fireworks. But actors Nakul Roshan Sahdev, Sharib Hashmi, Manish Chaudhari and Amole Gupte shine." Priyanka Gupta id DNA awarded 4 stars and said that "Murderbaad is a daring, layered thriller that’s not afraid to get its hands dirty. It delivers a genuine shock in its final moments, and leaves you thinking long after the credits roll."

Kritika Vaid of India.com obserevd that "Murderbaad offers a rewarding experience for viewers who appreciate bold and intelligent storytelling."
