= Madha (film) =

- Film poster
- Directed by: Srividya Basawa
- Written by: Prashanth Sagar Atlluri
- Produced by: Indira Basawa
- Starring: Trishna Mukherjee; Rahul Venkat
- Cinematography: Abhiraj Nair
- Edited by: Renjith Touchriver
- Music by: Naresh Kumaran
- Production company: Third Eye Productions
- Release dates: January 2019 (Noida Film Festival); 13 March 2020
- Country: India
- Language: Telugu

Madha is a 2019 Indian Telugu-language medical thriller film directed by Srividya Basawa (in her directorial debut) and starring Trishna Mukherjee and Rahul Venkat.

== Plot ==
Nisha is manipulated by Arjun

== Cast ==
- Trishna Mukherjee as Nisha
- Rahul Venkat as Arjun
- Bikramjeet Kanwarpal as Balasubramaniam
- Anish Kuruvilla as Ravi Varma

== Production ==
Srividya Basawa conceptualized the film in 2011. The independent film is of the thriller genre and much of the crew of the film are relatively newcomers and marks the directorial debut of the director. The low-budget film began shooting in June 2017 and commenced in September 2017.

== Themes ==
According to the director Srividya Basawa, Madha means "madness personified" in Sanskrit.

== Release and reception ==
The film released on 13 March 2020 and was removed from theatres two days later due to the COVID-19 pandemic.

The News Minute gave the film a rating of one out of five stars and stated that "All in all, Madha, somewhere at its core, had a decent plot. Between a low budget, bad actors, and incoherent screenplay, it loses its essence". Idlebrain noted that "Despite some shortcomings, Madha will stay as a nice attempt with good script/technical work". Film Companion wrote that "But for all that it gets wrong, Madha does more things right". The Times of India gave the film a rating of three out of five stars and stated that "Madha is a well-written thriller, penned by Prashanth Sagar Atlluri and helmed by Vidya, majorly because the duo does not indulge in clichés specific to the genre. This is one gripping thriller that’s worth a watch".

The film was available on Amazon Prime Video in April 2020.

== Awards and nominations ==
- Noida International Film Festival 2019 - Best Feature
- SIIMA Award for Best Debut Producer - Telugu for Third Eye Productions
