= Bikramjeet Kanwarpal =

Indian film and television actor (1968–2021)

Major Bikramjeet Kanwarpal
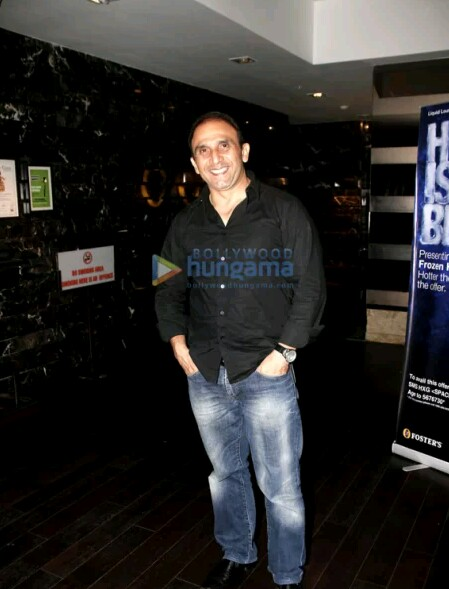
- Bikramjeet Kanwarpal in 2013
- Born: 29 August 1968; Solan, Himachal Pradesh, India
- Died: 1 May 2021 (aged 52); Mumbai, Maharashtra, India
- Other name: Bizz Kanwarpal
- Occupations: Actor; Former army officer
- Years active: 2003–2021
- Known for: 24
- Father: Lt Col Dwarka Nath Kanwarpal
- Military career
- Allegiance: India
- Branch: Indian Army
- Service years: 1989–2002
- Rank: Major

Major Bikramjeet Kanwarpal (29 August 1968 – 1 May 2021) was an Indian film and television actor. A retired army officer, Kanwarpal had played supporting roles in many films and television serials. Kanwarpal shared screen space with actor Anil Kapoor in 24.

== Early life and career ==
Kanwarpal was born in Solan, Himachal Pradesh, India. He was the son of an Indian Army officer, Lt Col Dwarka Nath Kanwarpal, who was awarded the Kirti Chakra in 1963. In 1986, Bikramjeet Kanwarpal completed his Higher Secondary Examination from The Lawrence School, Sanawar, and in 1989, he was commissioned into the Indian Army. He retired from the army in 2002 as a Major. In 2003, he debuted in Bollywood to fulfill his childhood dream of being an actor and had acted since then in many films. He was last seen in Hindi Film Shinaakht directed by Pragyesh Singh.

== Filmography ==
=== Films ===
==== Hindi films ====
- Page 3
- Paap as Ratan Singh
- Karam as Sub Inspector Naik
- Corporate as Sr V P - Sehgal Group
- Don as Dr Ashok Khilwani
- Kya Love Story Hai as Mr Mehta
- Khushboo: The Fragraance of Love
- Hijack as Amrinder Singh
- Thanks Maa as Zaveri
- Rocket Singh: Salesman of the Year as Inamdar
- Atithi Tum Kab Jaoge? as Munmun's Boss
- Knockout as Nidhi's Boss
- Turning 30!!! as Rathore
- Aarakshan
- My Friend Pinto as Ronnie
- Murder 2 as Commissioner Ahmed Khan
- Bumboo as Inspector
- Joker
- Jab Tak Hai Jaan as Samar Anand's Senior Army Officer
- Shaurya as Col.Inyat Khan
- 1971 as Col. Shakoor
- Dangerous Ishhq
- Kya Super Kool Hain Hum as Priest
- Chance Pe Dance as Bhutiya, Football Coach
- Mallika
- Zanjeer as Kataria
- Heyy Babyy as Advocate Mishra
- Heroine
- Shortcut Romeo as Suraj's Uncle
- Grand Masti
- Horror Story
- Riwayat
- Hate Story 2 as Photography professor
- Creature 3D as Inspector Chaubey
- 2 States as Rajji Mama
- Rahasya as Hansal Chabria
- Prem Ratan Dhan Payo as Estate agent
- Mr. X as Devraj Verma
- Bhaag Johnny as Third Eye Detective
- Ferrous as Inspector Jagdeesh Sinchwal
- The Ghazi Attack as Pakistan navy staff officer
- Indu Sarkar as Kela Chand
- Saaho as Jayender Singh
- Drive as Rathore
- Bypass Road as Dr Kamlesh
- The Power as Chedda
- Shinaakht as Syed Qadri (short film)

==== Other language films ====
- Anjaan (Tamil)
- Saaho (Telugu) as Jayender Singh
- Madha (2020) (Telugu) as Balasubramaniam
- Doctor (2021) (Tamil) as Terry's father

=== Television shows ===
- 24
- Kismat as Nawab Mubarak Khan
- Namak Haraam
- Simply Sapney
- Mere Rang Mein Rangne Waali
- Crime Patrol-Dastak
- Adaalat as Public Prosecutor Randhawa
- Har Yug Mein Aayega Ek Arjun as D.I.G Dustin Coelho
- Neeli Chhatri Waale
- Diya Aur Baati Hum
- Reporters as Khalid
- Siyasat
- Halla Bol (Bindass) as the Baba Ji in episode 11
- Kasam Tere Pyaar Ki as Balraaj Kapoor
- Yeh Hai Chahatein as Niketan Singhania
- Dil Hi Toh Hai as a surgeon
- Tenali Rama (TV series) as King Dhananjay Mudriya
- Avrodh: The Siege Within as Colonel Ajay Saxena (web series)
- Special OPS as G.P. Mathur (web series)
- Shrikant Bashir as First SOT Chief (web series)
- Dev DD 2

=== Web series ===
Year	Title	Role	Platform
2019	The Verdict - State vs Nanavati	Major Kohli	ALTBalaji and ZEE5
2020	Your Honor (Season 1)	Judge Punchh	SonyLIV
2020	Undekhi	Forest Officer	SonyLIV
2022	Bhaukaal (Season-2)	MLA Aslam Rana	MX Player

== Death ==
Bikramjeet Kanwarpal died from COVID-19 on 1 May 2021, at the age of 52.
