= St. Mary's Convent Inter College, Prayagraj =

St. Mary's Convent Inter College

Location
- 32 Thornhill Road Prayagraj, Uttar Pradesh; India; 25.45777°N 81.84558°E

Information
- Motto: Spe Labor Levis (Hope Lightens Work)
- Religious affiliation: Catholic Church or Roman Catholic
- Established: January 15, 1866; 160 years ago
- Founder: Mary Ward
- School board: CISCE
- Principal: Sr. Lissy CJ
- Hours in school day: 6
- Campus type: Urban
- Houses: Yellow, Blue, Red, Green
- Acronym: SMC

St. Mary's Convent Inter College, Prayagraj, Uttar Pradesh, India, is a girls school run by the Sisters of the Congregation of Jesus in collaboration with a lay staff members. It was founded in 1866 by Mother Mary Ward for the education of girls. The Delhi and the Lucknow campuses are co-educational.

The college was founded to provide an education to all sections of society, regardless of caste, creed or financial status. The children are prepared for the ICSE Examination at the class 10 level, the ISC at the +2 level conducted by the CISCE Delhi.

The institution, established and administered by the Christian Society, comes under articles 29 and 30 of the Indian Constitution and for Religious Jurisdiction it comes directly under the Roman Catholic Diocese of Prayagraj .

The principal of the school is Sister Lissy CJ. It also runs a school for underprivileged children called Asha Deep.

The motto of the school is "Hope Lightens Work" (from the Latin version - Spe Labor Levis').

Members of the student council are selected each year, including the Head Girl, Vice Head Girl, House Captains, House Vice Captains, Student Editor and Sub-Editor, USM President and vice-president, Games Captain, Games Vice Captain.

St Mary's celebrated 150 years of its existence in the year 2016.

== Notable alumni ==
Throughout its history a sizable number of alumni have become notable in various fields.

- Indira Gandhi, a key 20th-century stateswoman, a central figure of the Indian National Congress party, and to date the only female Prime Minister of India intermittently attended this premier institution until her matriculation in 1934.
- Shubha Mudgal, singer of Hindustani classical music.
- Dr.Deepali Pant Joshi, executive director of Reserve Bank of India.
- Neelum Saran Gour, author, translator, academic and chronicler of various facets of Allahabad city.
- Shahnaz Husain entrepreneur
- Leema Dhar, novelist and poet
- Dr. Shuchi Grover, learning scientist and computer science education researcher
- Nidhi Singh, television and film actor.
- Rita Bahuguna Joshi, politician and ex-cabinet minister in the Government of Uttar Pradesh.
- Aradhana Mishra also known as Mona Misra, politician and member of 17th Legislative Assembly of Uttar Pradesh
- Geetanjali Shree is the first Hindi novelist to receive International Booker Prize in 2022.

== Lucknow ==
Another branch of St. Mary's is in RDSO Colony, Manak Nagar, Lucknow, Uttar Pradesh. The principal of the school is Sr. Marina CJ and the manager is Sr. Mariette CJ. The motto of the school is "Efforts Spell Success". Unlike the Prayagraj branch, this branch happens to be a co-educational institute. The office bearers in this branch include the Head Boy, Head Girl, House captains, Games captains, and class monitors. The class monitors of year 12 acts as the prefects of the college.
