= Bahut Hua Samman =

2020 Indian comedy film

- Release Poster
- Directed by: Ashish R. Shukla
- Written by: Avinash Singh; Vijay Narayan Verma
- Produced by: Siddharth Anand Kumar; Saregama
- Starring: Raghav Juyal; Abhishek Chauhan; Sanjay Mishra; Ram Kapoor; Nidhi Singh; Namit Das; Flora Saini
- Cinematography: Parasher Baruah
- Edited by: Suchitra Sathe; Abhijeet Deshpande
- Music by: Mannan Munjal
- Production companies: Yoodlee films Saregama
- Distributed by: Disney+ Hotstar
- Release date: 2 October 2020
- Running time: 125 minutes
- Country: India
- Language: Hindi
- Budget: ₹10- 15 Cr

Bahut Hua Samman (transl. Enough of respect) is a 2020 Indian Hindi-language comedy thriller film directed by Ashish R. Shukla. It was produced and bankrolled by Yoodlee films, the film division of Saregama. The film stars Raghav Juyal, Abhishek Chauhan, Sanjay Mishra, Ram Kapoor, Nidhi Singh, Namit Das and Flora Saini. It premiered on Disney+ Hotstar on 2 October 2020 and received positive reviews.

== Plot ==
Fundoo and Bony, two struggling mechanical engineering students who failed to graduate, survive through small-time scams and thefts. After attending a party celebrating their classmates' successful careers, they encounter Baba, an eccentric anti-establishment figure who convinces them to rob a bank branch at their college. Baba specifically instructs them to target the locker of the college dean PMS, believing it contains something valuable. Using their engineering knowledge, Fundoo and Bony devise a plan to enter the locker room through underground water pipes. However, the robbery goes wrong when they discover that the lockers have already been looted and the police are waiting at the scene. They are arrested and interrogated by officer Bobby, a police inspector with a background in mechanical engineering.

PMS reveals to politician Netaji that an item known as the Kohinoor has been stolen from his locker. Netaji, under pressure from businessman Baba Ji of Akhand Bharat Sansthan, hires former commando Lovely Singh to recover it. Meanwhile, the actual robbery is traced to two criminals, Raju and Bhola, who had stolen the valuables to repay a debt to gangster Baalu Bhaiya. As multiple groups search for the missing Kohinoor, betrayals and killings follow. Baalu Bhaiya is murdered by Lovely Singh, while Sapna, associated with Raju and Bhola, is killed after revealing information about the stolen bag. Fundoo and Bony are eventually drawn back into the search after Baba learns that the Kohinoor is hidden near an abandoned farmhouse.

When the bag is recovered, the Kohinoor is revealed not to be a diamond but a diary containing evidence of corruption involving Akhand Bharat Sansthan and a chemical formula used in the company's products. Bobby investigates the organisation and discovers evidence of a substance designed to create addiction among consumers. Fundoo, Bony and Bobby travel to a laboratory connected to Akhand Bharat Sansthan, where they are attacked by Lovely Singh. Baba intervenes and kills Lovely. The corruption scandal is later exposed, leading to the arrest of Baba Ji. Fundoo and Bony profit financially after betting against Akhand Bharat's shares, while Bobby later becomes a mother through in vitro fertilisation with Baba as the sperm donor. The film ends with Baba, Fundoo and Bony celebrating their success together.

== Cast ==
- Sanjay Mishra as Ram Prasad aka Bakch*d Baba
- Raghav Juyal as Bony
- Abhishek Chauhan as Fundoo
- Ram Kapoor as Lovely Singh
- Nidhi Singh as Bobby Tiwari
- Namit Das as Rajat Tiwari
- Flora Saini as Sapna Rani
- Sharat Sonu as Bhola
- Bhupesh Singh as Raju
- Dibyendu Bhattacharya as Nangu Baba
- Nidhi Bisht as Apeksha (VOICE)

== Release ==
The film released on Disney+ Hotstar on 2 October 2020.

== Soundtrack ==
Bahut Hua Sammaan

Soundtrack album by Ankit Uppal
- Released: 6 October 2020
- Recorded: 2020
- Genre: Feature film soundtrack
- Length: 39:00
- Language: Hindi
- Label: Saregama

The music is composed by Ankit Uppal and Mannan Munjal and released on Saregama label.

Track list
No.	Title	Lyrics	Music	Singer(s)	Length
1.	"Bahut Hua Sammaan Title Track"	Prikshit Gupta	Parry G	Mannan Munjal	3:05
2.	"Boom Boom Mix Up"	Indeewar	Nazia Hassan	Mannan Munjal	3:42
3.	"Dhano Ki Aankhon Mein"	Gulzar	R.D.Burman	R.D.Burman	4:00
4.	"Kela Kaise Khaogi"	Naushad	Munni Ketkiwali	Charanjit Ahuja	3:15
5.	"Follow Me"	Anjaan	Sharon Prabhakar	Bappi Lahiri	5:03
6.	"Boogie Boogie"	Anjaan	Asha Bhosle, Bappi Lahiri	Bappi Lahiri	6:18
7.	"O Go Piya"	Guahar Kanpuri	Sulakshana Pandit	Bappi Lahiri	7:02
8.	"One Rupee Ten Rupees"	Indeewar	Usha Mangeshkar, Chandrani Mukherjee, Shailendra Singh	Bappi Lahiri	7:15
Total length:					39:00
