= Arfi Lamba =

Indian actor

- Born: Moga, Punjab
- Occupations: Actor, Producer
- Years active: 2008–2018
- Parents: Upinder Singh Lamba (father); Kamal Lamba (mother)
- Website: arfilamba.com

Arfi Lamba is an Indian-born actor, producer, entertainer, philosopher, and humanist who has appeared in films, television shows, theatre productions, television commercials, and print advertisements. His acting debut on screen came in 2008 with the film Slumdog Millionaire. He is known for his role in the action-comedy film Singh Is Bliing, directed by Prabhu Deva and co-starring Akshay Kumar, Amy Jackson, Lara Dutta and Kay Kay Menon.

He lives in Mumbai and is now also co-owner and promoter of Bombay Berlin Film Productions, along with Katharina Suckale.

== Early life and education ==
Born in Punjab, India, he attended Thapar University, former Institute of Engineering and Technology, where he pursued a Bachelor of Science in Engineering. Before becoming an actor, he worked as an engineer at Engineers India Limited, Delhi and was a part of process designed for refineries.

In 2008, he moved to Mumbai and received his performing arts training from Shri Dinesh Thakur, Mahabano Modi Kotwal and Vinod Nahri of the Ank Theatre Group. To further polish his skills through 2008 to 2015, Lamba participated in workshops in Berlin, Cannes and Mumbai studying acting and dance under Nancy Bishop, Teresa Harder, Karin Seven, Bharti Jaffery, Atul Mongia and Neeraj Kabi.

During the 33rd Cairo International Film Festival he was honored for being a part of the award-winning film Slumdog Millionaire along with Irrfan Khan and Anil Kapoor.

== Acting career ==
After realising he wanted to be an actor, Lamba gained national exposure when he began acting professionally on the stage. One of his first substantial roles was in the acclaimed musical play Anjor Kaya, a debut production of Prarambh Performing Arts. He garnered recognition for his performances in highly praised Indo-Pakistan partition drama Jis Lahore Nai Dekhya, social satirical play Chabi, and murder mystery play Tere Pyar Mein.

In addition to stage roles, Lamba appeared in short films including Shunyata (2007) and A Perfect Murder (2007) and Rohan Sabharwal's film Shades of Grey, critically acclaimed in London and other short film festival circuits. He played one of the lead roles in the romantic film Prague (in which he portrayed Chandan Roy Sanyal's alter ego), which received critical acclaim but did not do well at the box office. Lamba played a pivotal role in Kabir Sadanand's action-comedy film Fugly. His television performance credits include AXN television's Man’s World episode featuring What men want; and Star Plus' Prithvi Raj Chauhan - historical costume Drama about a brave Indian prince. He has had appearances in award-winning National College student's film An Open road with a dead end, and a corporate film for Procter & Gamble.

Throughout his career, the actor has been featured on several print media outlets including Lancel, Paris, Air Sahara inhouse magazine, Donear Suitings, Calendar for Escotel, Woman’s Era Editorial Shoot, Hercules Health drink, and CMS Computer Education.

He has been signed on by a boutique talent management company, Empire Agency, to represent him for the rest of the world, while in India he is represented by Viniyard Films.

== Bombay Berlin Film Productions ==
Lamba along with Katharina Suckale, is the owner and promoter of Bombay Berlin Film Production, a one-of-a-kind Indo-European Film Production house.

Prague was the first film the company co-produced. A psychological thriller and romance in which Lamba played a pivotal role, it was released in 2012 to critical acclaim, though it did not perform well in the box office. The Marathi film Maunraag was their second such co-production, which even featured in the Indian International Film Festival of South Africa.

Their debut in-house production feature LOEV, a love saga between three men, made its world premiere in a prestigious Tallinn International Film Festival and competed for the Best Debut Feature and Best Debut Film awards in November 2015. The film sold five territories, and saw its Indian debut at the 18th MAMI Mumbai Film Festival 2016, all to very positive reviews.

Aside from 'LOEV,' Bombay Berlin Film Productions has also co-produced the first ever Myanmar-French-German-Taiwanese collaboration - The Road To Mandalay, a tragic love story about two immigrants leaving Myanmar for Taiwan in search of a better life. The film has been across many film festivals including the Venice Film Festival, The Toronto International Film Festival, the Busan International Film Festival and the MAMI Mumbai Film Festival. The film has also been nominated for six Golden Horse Awards and won the FEDEORA award for best film.

Lamba was on the jury of 22nd Cairo International Children’s film festival 2015.

== Filmography ==
| Year | Title | Role | Notes |
|---|---|---|---|
| 2018 | The Idiot | Abdul | |
| 2018 | Shinaakht | Idrish | |
| 2017 | Gift | Kiran | |
| 2015 | Singh Is Bliing | Pappy | |
| 2015 | Marry Me! | Mr. Lamba | |
| 2014 | Fugly | Aditya | |
| 2013 | Prague | Arfi | |
| 2008 | Slumdog Millionaire | Actor | |

== Theatre ==
| Year | Title | Role |
|---|---|---|
| 2009 | Anjor Kaaya | Actor |
| 2005-2006 | Chabi | Actor |
| 2005-2006 | Jis Lahore Nahin Vekheya | Actor |
| 2005-2006 | Tere Pyar Me | Actor |

== Awards ==
| Year | Award | Category |
|---|---|---|
| 2018 | Udyod Rattan Award | Best Entrepreneur (Bombay Berlin Film Productions) |
| 2018 | 3rd Lake City International Film Festival | Best Actor (The Idiot) |
| 2018 | Kala-Samruddhi International Short Film Festival | Best Actor (The Idiot) |
