= Ken Ghosh =

Indian film director and screenwriter

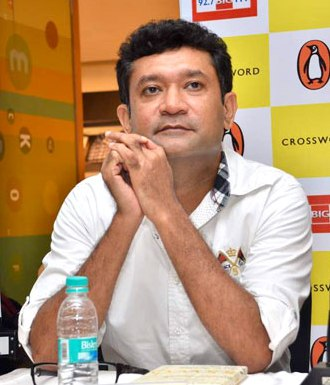
- Director Ken Ghosh at the launch of book "Nick Time" by Komal Mehta. 2013
- Born: 19 August 1966 (age 60); Mumbai, Maharastra, India
- Education: The Bishop's School
- Occupations: Film director, Film writer

Ken Ghosh is an Indian director, producer and screenwriter.

== Filmography ==
Year	Title	Director	Producer	Writer	Notes
1999	Double Gadbad	Yes	No	Yes	
2000	Har Pal	Yes	No	Yes	Short film
2003	Ishq Vishk	Yes	No	Story	Also editor
2004	Fida	Yes	No	No	
2005	A.D.A.	No	Yes	No	
2007	Chain Kulii Ki Main Kulii	No	Yes	No	
2010	Chance Pe Dance	Yes	No	Yes	Also lyricist
2017	Dev DD	Yes	No	No	Web series
2018	XXX	Yes	No	Yes	Web series
2018	Haq Se	Yes	No	No	Web series
2019	Abhay	Yes	No	Yes	Web series
2021	State of Siege: Temple Attack	Yes	No	Yes	ZEE5 film
