= Lee Moss (filmmaker) =

American director

Lee Moss (formerly Laura Moss) is an American director, screenwriter, and production designer. They (Note: Moss is non-binary and uses they/them pronouns.) are best known for their feature film debut, Birth/Rebirth, which premiered at the 2023 Sundance Film Festival and was nominated for three Independent Spirit Awards.

== Early life and education ==
Moss was born in New York City. They attended Fiorello H. LaGuardia High School and received both their bachelor's and master's degree at NYU's Tisch School of the Arts.

As a college student, they were evacuated from their dorm in lower Manhattan during the September 11 attacks, an experience which caused them to reconsider a career in the arts. They worked for the Palestinian Red Crescent Society as an EMT before returning to the U.S. and working as an art director and production designer.

== Career ==
Moss production designed the Egyptian film Yomeddine, directed by A.B. Shawky. The film won the François Chalais Prize at the 2018 Cannes Film Festival. Moss and Shawky both studied directing at NYU's graduate film program.

Moss's thesis film at NYU, Fry Day, was set during a tailgate event that popped up in the hours leading up to Ted Bundy's execution. It premiered at SXSW in 2017 and won the Student Visionary Award that year's Tribeca Film Festival. It is currently featured on Kanopy.

They co-wrote their feature directorial debut, Birth/Rebirth, with their ex-husband, Brendan J. O’Brien. The two have produced work together under their company name, Retrospecter Films since 2015.

== Birth/Rebirth ==
Birth/Rebirth premiered at the 2023 Sundance Film Festival, opening the Midnight section. The film, starring Marin Ireland and Judy Reyes, has been described as a modern reimagining of Mary Shelley's Frankenstein.

In that same year, Moss was nominated for an Independent Spirit Award as Someone To Watch. Birth/Rebirth received two additional Independent Spirit Award nominations: Best Screenplay, and Best Lead Performance for Judy Reyes.

Birth/Rebirth was released theatrically by IFC Films in August, 2023.
