= Dange (surname) =

Dange is a surname native to the Indian state of Maharashtra. The Dange surname is used mainly in the brahmin community

== Notable people ==
- Shripad Amrit Dange (1899–1991), founding member of the Communist Party of India (CPI), stalwart of Indian trade union movement
- Anna Dange, an Indian politician
- JP Dange, an Indian Civil servant
- Srushti Dange, an Indian actress
