= Women of '69, Unboxed =

- Film poster
- Directed by: Peter Barton
- Produced by: Liz Roman Gallese
- Release date: April 26, 2014 (Saratoga Film Forum)
- Running time: 59 minutes
- Country: United States
- Language: English

Women of '69, Unboxed is a 2014 documentary film by director/producer Peter Barton and executive producer/producer Liz Roman Gallese. It is about 19 women who graduated from Skidmore College in 1969, when it was still an all-women college. The film won two awards at film festivals and received positive reception.

== Description ==
During their time at Skidmore College, the 19 subjects of the film had a year box rather than a year book. Their year box contained photographs that showed what they experienced throughout college. Barton interviewed them when they were near 65 years old. He also interviewed some of the men, including their professors, whom they met while they were in college. The film goes from interviewee to interviewee at random. Interspersed with the interviews are photographs of the women as college students. Executive producer Liz Roman Gallese was a member of that year's graduating class.

The film touches on women's issues that are still important in modern times such as in relation to marriage, careers, and whether to have children. The "focal point" of the film is the women in the present. In 1971, Skidmore College opened up to men as well.

== Release ==
The film was screened at the Woods Hole Film Festival (Cape Cod), the Women’s International Film and Arts Festival (Miami, Florida), the Queens World Film Festival (New York City), and the New York City Independent Film Festival.

It aired on the Maine Public Broadcasting Network (MPBN-TV) on July 5, 2015. On March 29, 2016, the film aired on WNED in Buffalo, N.Y. and WBFO in Toronto, Ontario, Canada.

== Reception ==
It won the ShortsHD Award for Best Short Documentary at the New York City Independent Film Festival in 2015 and Best Documentary Feature at the Queens World Film Festival in March 2016. At the 2015 Woods Hole Film Festival it was the 1st runner-up in the Best Documentary Feature category.

Tim Miller of the Cape Cod Times wrote, "This shouldn’t be a big surprise, of course, but, for their era, their pursuit of independent lives was groundbreaking, and Women of ’69, Unboxed makes that point loud and clear. And effectively." In a review for Next Avenue, Linda Bernstein wrote, "The freedoms these women fought for — that they had to even fight for things like the right to drink alcohol on campus — is the lesson of the film."
