= Rural management =

Study of managing rural areas

Rural management is the study of planning, organising, directing, and controlling of rural areas, co-operatives, agribusiness and related fields.
