= Nidhi Singh =

Indian television and film actress (born 1986)

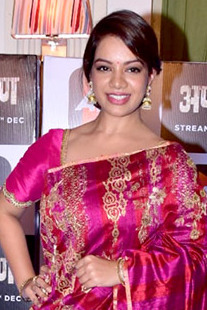
- Nidhi at the trailer launch of Apaharan in 2018
- Born: 4 October 1986 (age 39); Allahabad, Uttar Pradesh, India
- Education: St. Mary's Convent Inter College
- Occupation: Actress
- Years active: 2013-present
- Known for: Permanent Roommates (2014-16); Apharan (web series) (2018)
- Relatives: Shashwat Singh

Nidhi Singh is an Indian television and film actress. She is known for her character as Tanya Nagpal in Permanent Roommates, an Indian web series created by The Viral Fever and Biswapati Sarkar (2014–16). In 2018 she appeared as Ayesha Kumar in the film Dil Juunglee alongside Taapsee Pannu and Saqib Saleem. She made her debut through a multilingual short film Khuli Khidki in 2013. Nidhi was nominated for the Indian Television Academy Award for Best Actress at the ITA Awards.

== Early life ==
Nidhi Singh was born in 1986 in Allahabad, Uttar Pradesh, India. She studied at St. Mary's Convent Inter College in Allahabad. Her father Birendra Singh is an Indian Railway employee. She has an elder brother Rishabh Singh and a younger brother Shashwat Singh, who is a singer in Hindi, Tamil, Bengali movies.

== Filmography ==
=== Films ===
Year	Title	Character	Language	Note/Ref.
2013	Khuli Khidki	Girl in the house	English, Hindi	Short
2013	The Drama of the Dagger	Niharika	English	Short
2017	Long Live Brij Mohan	Sweety	Hindi	
2018	Dil Juunglee	Ayesha Kumar	Hindi	
2020	Bahut Hua Samman	Bobby Tiwari	Hindi	
2022	Dobaaraa	Bhavna Avasthi	Hindi	
2025	Single Salma	Ratna	Hindi	

=== Web series ===
Year	Title	Role	Platform	Notes
2014– 2023	Permanent Roommates	Tanya Nagpal	YouTube, MX Player, TVF Play, Amazon Prime Video	
2015	Pitchers	Aarti	YouTube, MX Player, TVF Play	Cameo
2015	Man's World	Persistent pick up line woman	YouTube channel YFilms	
2017	Humorously Yours	Reporter	MX Player	Cameo
2018	Apharan-Sabka Katega	Ranjana Srivastava	ALTBalaji	
2019	ImMature	Sonam Teacher	MX Player	Cameo
2019	M.O.M. - Mission Over Mars	Neetu Sinha	ALTBalaji and ZEE5	
2020	Zindagi inShort	Neighbour		
2020	Abhay	Khushboo	ZEE5	
2020	Wakaalat From Home	Radhika Sen	Amazon Prime Video	
2020	PariWar- pyaar ke aagey war	Mandakini Narayan aka Guddan	Disney+ Hotstar	
2020	Mismatched	Warden	Netflix	
2020	Dark 7 White	Daisy	ZEE5	
2022	Apharan-Sabka Katega Dobara	Ranjana Srivastava	Voot Select	
2023	Tankesh Diaries	Tanya Nagpal	YouTube	
2024	Moonwalk	Chandani	JioCinema	
