= Susmit Sen =

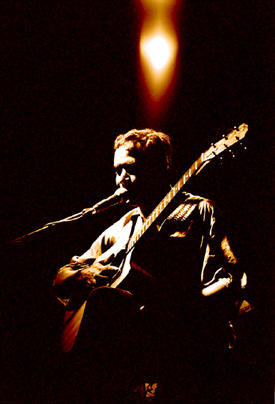

Background information
- Origin: Delhi, India
- Genre: Fusion rock
- Occupations: Guitarist, singer
- Instrument: Guitar
- Years active: 1990–present
- Website: susmitsenmusic.com

Susmit Sen is an Indian guitarist formerly part of Indian Ocean, an Indian fusion rock band, which he founded with lead vocalist Asheem Chakravarty in 1990. Sen released his first solo album, Depths of the Ocean in 2011, in the following year, he also started touring with his separate band, The Susmit Sen Chronicles, and eventually left Indian Ocean in 2013 to pursue a solo career.

== Early life and career ==
Susmit Sen's first guitar was one bought by his father for his elder brother in Mumbai. He had been influenced by his brother's ability to attract attention by playing the guitar.

He did his schooling from St. Xavier's School, Delhi in 1981, and graduation from Hansraj College.

== Career ==
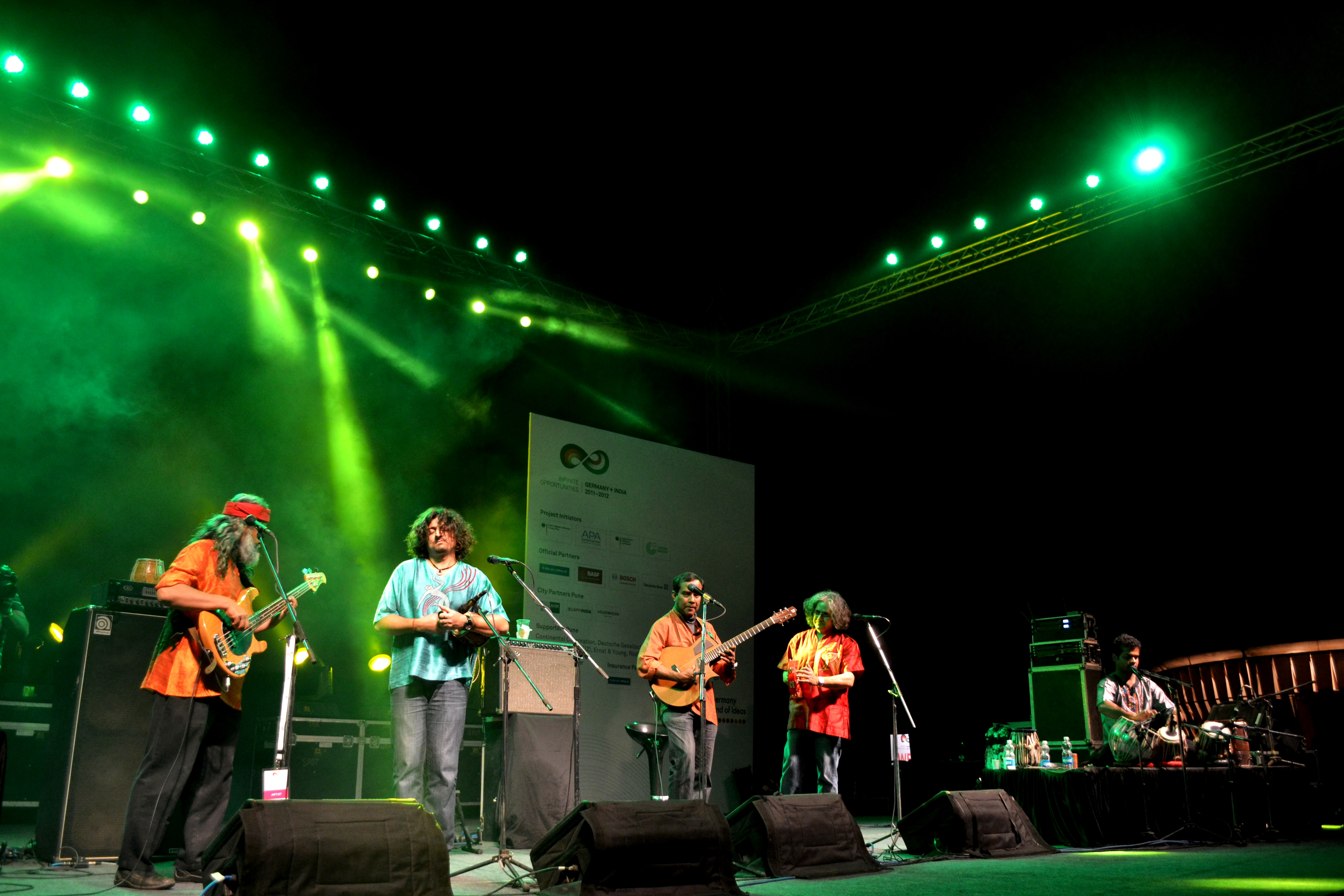
Sen performing with Indian Ocean in Pune

A self-taught musician, Sen started the band, Indian Ocean, with Late Asheem Chakravarty in 1990. They were joined by Rahul Ram in 1991, and in 1991 by multi-instrumentalist Amit Kilam completing the quartet. Using Indian rhythms, melodies and folk music influences the band created a unique sound and soon achieved success; in following decades produced five studio albums, and a live album, Desert Rain. Besides this a concert DVD, Indian Ocean Live In Concert of their two-hour live concert at the Garden of Five Senses in Delhi was released in 2008. Leaving Home – the Life & Music of Indian Ocean (2010) directed by Jaideep Varma, it became the first band ever in India to be subject of a documentary. At the 58th National Film Awards, the documentary went on to win the Award for Best Arts/Cultural Film.

Founder member, Chakravarty died suddenly in 2009, due to heart attack. Sen released his first solo debut album Depths of the Ocean in 2011, an album which had been in the making for the last ten years. Featuring collaboration with Shubha Mudgal, Nitin Malik, Papon, and Asheem Chakravarty. In 2012, he started touring with a new setup of artistes, called The Susmit Sen Chronicles, which included drummer Nikhil Vasudevan, bassist Anirban Ghosh, tabla player Varun Gupta and vocalists Amit Sharma and Sudhir Rikhari. Thereafter Sen left Indian Ocean in June 2013, to pursue his solo career. However, he joined the Indian Ocean for a farewell tour in end 2013, thereafter he was replaced by guitarist Nikhil Rao.

Early 2014 saw the release of an eponymously titled coffee table photography book on the group's history. As a tribute, the Dehradun Guitar Company has created the SS Series of Guitars named after Susmit Sen. He started work on his second solo-album in October 2013 and completed it in following March. In July 2014, the album Ocean to Ocean was released, which also featured a collaborative track with Bernie Marsden, the former Whitesnake guitarist. Later in the year he released his memoir, Ocean to Ocean: A Memoir co-written with Sehba Imam. In its 2014 listing of "25 Greatest Indian Rock Songs of the last 25 Years", "Rolling Stone India" featured two songs, Ma Rewa and Kandisa from the album, Kandisa (2000).

== Discography ==
=== Indian Ocean ===
- Indian Ocean (1993)
- Desert Rain (1997)
- Kandisa (2000)
- Jhini (2004)
- Black Friday (2005)
- 16/330 Khajoor Road (2010)
- Footballwaaliyan (2019)

=== Susmit Sen Chronicles ===
- Depths of the Ocean (2011)
- Ocean to Ocean (2014)

== Filmography ==
- Swaraj: The Little Republic (2003)
- Black Friday (2004)
- Peepli Live (2010)
- Footballwaaliyan (2019)

== Works ==
- Ocean to Ocean: A Memoir (with Sehba Imam), HarperCollins, 2014. ISBN 9351362019.

== Bibliography ==
- Indian Ocean: A Photographic Journey, Vineet Sharma. Parragon Publishing, 2014. ISBN 147230750X.
