= Jaimin Rajani =

Indian singer-songwriter

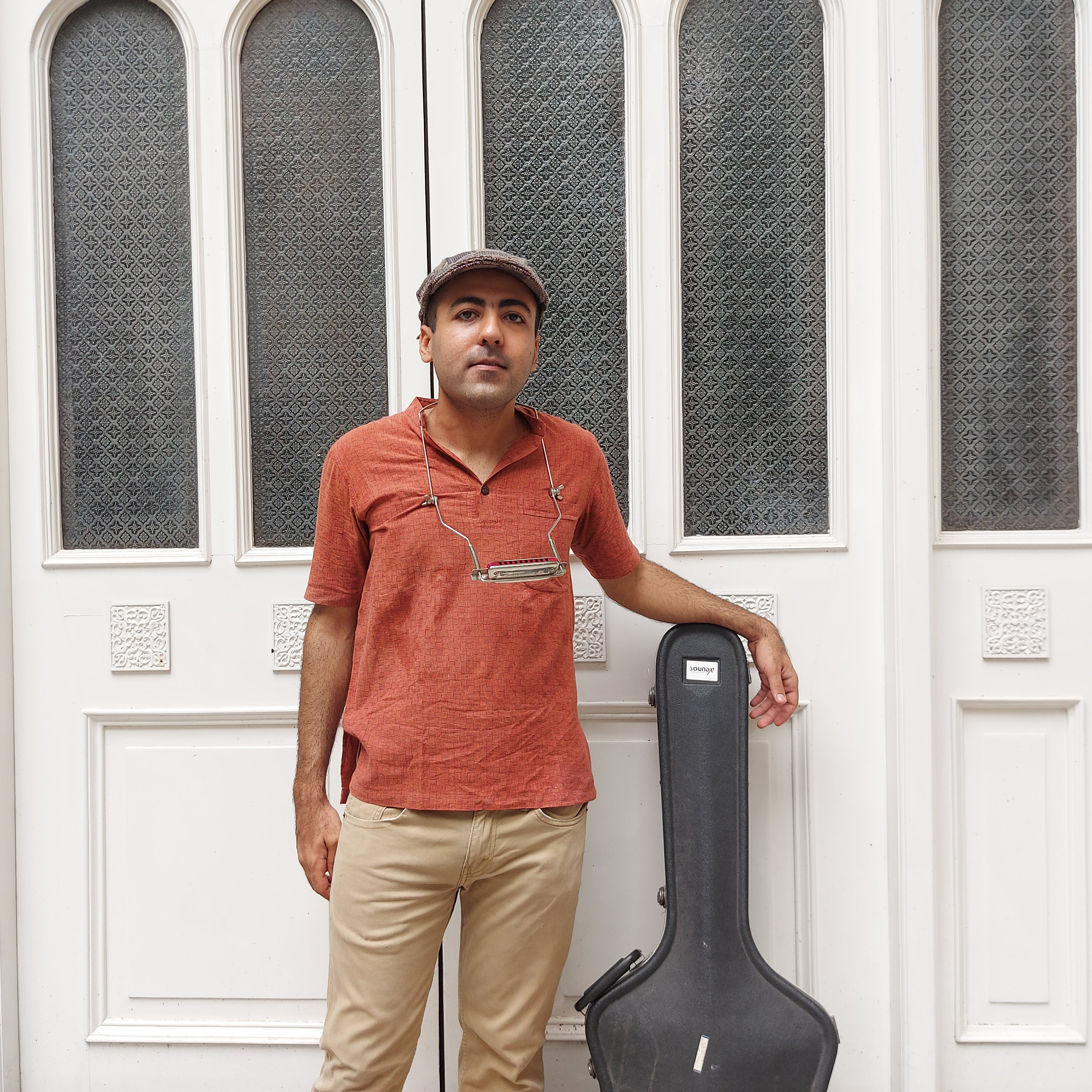
- Rajani in Calcutta
- Born: 30 June 1991 (age 35); Bombay, Maharashtra, India
- Other name: Jaimin
- Occupations: Singer-songwriter; Musician; Composer
- Years active: 2022–present
- Musical career
- Genres: Indie folk; Folk rock; Indie rock; Folk pop; Indian pop
- Instruments: Guitar; harmonica; vocals
- Website: jaimin.in

Jaimin Rajani (born 30 June 1991 in Bombay) is a singer-songwriter from Calcutta, India. He writes songs in the traditions of folk and rock music. He has also guested on Antonio Vergara's GRAMMY-nominated album, The Fury.

His debut album, Cutting Loose comprises fourteen songs about conflicts, disappointment and departure. The album features an ensemble of Indian musicians, such as Arka Chakraborty (pianist), Subharaj Ghosh (guitarist), Arjun Chakraborty (drummer), Ralph Pais (bassist), Deepak Castelino, Rahul Ram (of Indian Ocean), and American bluegrass artistes Patrick Fitzsimons and Billy Cardine (of The Biscuit Burners).

In The Quint, filmmaker Jaideep Varma describes Cutting Loose as "India's finest-ever album of original English songs". It was titled 'The Best Rock Album of the Year' at Clef Music Awards 2022. Later in 2024, Jaimin was honoured as Lyricist of the Year at the Clef Music Awards. In addition to being critically acclaimed, the album and its individual tracks have been highly praised by illustrious artists like John Sebastian, Pete Townshend, Scarlet Rivera and Rob Stoner.

== Discography ==
=== Albums ===
- Cutting Loose (2022)

=== Singles ===
- "Techno Girl" (2025)
- "Seven Sins" (2024)
- "Can't Get Away ft. The Bluegrass Journeymen" (2024)
- "No Vices" (2024)
- "She's Running Late" (2022)
- "One More Night" (2022)
- "I'm Going Solo" (2022)
- "She" (2022)
- "Bucket of Pain" (2022)

== Filmography ==
Year	Title
2019	If Not for You
2020	Calcutta Refurbished
2022	Singhara Chow

=== If Not for You (2019) ===
In 2019, Jaimin made a documentary titled If Not for You narrated by veteran actor Dhritiman Chatterjee, on how American musician, Bob Dylan inspired notable Indian artists such as Anjan Dutt, Purna Das Baul, Amyt Datta, Usha Uthup, Susmit Bose, Arko Mukhaerjee, Miti Adhikari (of BBC Maida Vale Studios), Nondon Bagchi, Rahul Guha Ro (of Cassini's Division).

=== Calcutta Refurbished (2020) ===
His series of short documentaries on subjects of great cultural and historical significance such as the Indian classical instrument shop Hemen & Co. and the Manackjee Rustomjee Parsi Dharamshala in Kolkata, featuring music by Ustad Aashish Khan, John Barham and Shiraz Ali Khan.
