= Black Friday (soundtrack) =

Soundtrack album by Indian Ocean
- Released: 15 June 2005
- Genre: Fusion; rock; jazz
- Length: 49:16
- Language: Hindi
- Label: Times Music
- Producer: K. J. Singh

Indian Ocean chronology
Jhini (2003)	Black Friday (2005)	16/330 Khajoor Road (2010)

Black Friday is the soundtrack album to the 2004 film of the same name directed by Anurag Kashyap. The album is composed by the fusion band Indian Ocean in their maiden composition stint for a feature film and blends a fusion of rock and jazz genres. The album had lyrics written by Piyush Mishra and is produced by K. J. Singh. It was released under the Times Music label on 15 June 2005 to positive reviews from critics.

== Development ==
Kashyap opted for bands to compose music for the film, over prominent Bollywood composers as he "wanted to use someone away from the pollution of Mumbai kind of music, sounds that are virgin, which have an eccentricity too". He then approached the band Indian Ocean to compose the soundtrack album and the background score. Black Friday marked the band's first full-length film soundtrack they worked on. Kashyap provided them creative freedom for them to work on the music. The composition process took them two months, as unlike working on studio albums where they have more time to curate and produce it, they had to adhere with the deadlines and bringing Kashyap's vision and ideas to reality. However, the compositions were curated with the band's sensibilities in mind.

The band considered the film's soundtrack to be different from Kandisa (2000) and Jhini (2004) as those albums were much longer in duration—around 70 minutes—while Black Friday consisted of nine songs around 49 minutes. Piyush Mishra admitted that the lyrics were difficult for traditional singers which opted the band to perform all the songs. According to the bassist Rahul Ram, "If you listen to the Black Friday album, it was a different sound, including the background score. It is different from anything we had done before. Our impact comes through works like that as well, which gives us a lot more dimensions to play around with. There is a lot of scope."

== Release ==
The soundtrack album was released under the Times Music label digitally on 15 June 2005 and in DVD formats on 23 July 2005. The video of the song "Bandeh" featured snippets from the film and was aired in music channels long before the film faced a twenty-month ban and reached the topmost second on music charts. The album also attained immense popularity despite the film's ban.

== Reception ==
The album received a generally positive response. Devdulal Das of The Times of India wrote that songs like "Bandey" "just re-established this quartet from Delhi as having a distinct sound of their own - something that most bands from India can't boast of." Bhasker Gupta of AllMusic called it a "full-blown and outright stylish contemporary and musically rich album" and wrote: "It's rare that one hears Indian classical music amalgamated with Western electric jazz and Sufi music, and this is where the beauty of this album lies." BH Harsh of Firstpost wrote "Indie band Indian Ocean provides a stunningly tense soundtrack, in great sync with Kashyap’s treatment." It has been still considered as one of the band's best works.

== Track listing ==
All lyrics are written by Piyush Mishra

No.	Title	Singer(s)	Length
1.	"Bandeh"	Indian Ocean	07:48
2.	"Badshah in Jail"	Indian Ocean	07:26
3.	"Bharam Paap Ke"	Indian Ocean	08:36
4.	"Opening"	Indian Ocean	04:48
5.	"Bomb Planting"	Indian Ocean	03:55
6.	"Memon House"	Indian Ocean	06:17
7.	"Rdx"	Indian Ocean	03:11
8.	"Training"	Indian Ocean	03:59
9.	"Chase"	Indian Ocean	03:31
Total length:			49:18
