= 2022 in rock music =

This article summarizes the events related to rock music for the year of 2022.

== Notable events ==
=== January ===
- Guitarist Nita Strauss and Disturbed frontman David Draiman's song "Dead Inside" tops the Billboard Mainstream Rock Songs chart. This makes Strauss the first female solo artist to top it in over 30 years, after Alannah Myles song "Black Velvet" in 1990.
- The topic of COVID-19 vaccinations creates a rift in rock music culture. On one end, musicians such as Neil Young and Joni Mitchell take their music off of music streaming service Spotify in protest of their hosting of Joe Rogan's podcast that has contained COVID-19 misinformation. Conversely, artists like Kid Rock releases songs with anti-vax messages.
- Singer-songwriter Gayle's song "ABCDEFU", described by UK's Official Charts Company and US's Billboard magazine as a pop punk song, is described as being the "biggest song in the world" after topping the Billboard Global 200 and Billboard Global Excl. U.S. charts for multiple weeks.

=== February ===
- UK alternative rock band Wolf Alice wins the Brit Award for British Group of the year at the 42nd Brit Awards.
- Pop rapper Doja Cat records a faithful cover version of Courtney Love's 1994 song "Celebrity Skin" for a Taco Bell commercial originally airing during the 2022 Super Bowl. The song is later released as a stand-alone single, and charts on multiple national rock music song charts, her first song to do so.
- Two rock songs debut on the Billboard all-format Hot 100 chart in the same week, a rare feat for rock music in the 2020s. One is Machine Gun Kelly's song "Emo Girl", while the other is Red Hot Chili Peppers first single in five years, "Black Summer".
- Korn releases their fourteenth studio album, Requiem, a more melodic release, with an emphasis on layering guitars. The album is released to positive reviews, and is the second best-selling album of the week on the US Billboard Top Album Sales chart. However, factoring in streaming music data with album-equivalent units, it only debuts at number 14 on the US all-format Billboard 200 chart, making it their first album since their debut album in 1994 to not debut in the top 10.
- English musician Frank Turner releases his ninth studio album, FTHC. It became his first album to top the UK albums chart.
- Canadian musician Avril Lavigne releases her seventh studio album Love Sux. The album, produced by John Feldmann, Mod Sun and Travis Barker, marks a return to her earlier pop punk sound. It debuts at number 9 on the Billboard 200, moving 30,000 album equivalent units, and is her first album since 2013 to debut in the top 10 of the chart.
- Three Days Grace and Shinedown each have songs that top the Billboard Mainstream Rock Songs chart. The fact that both have been topping the chart since the early 2000s, and keep trading places for band with most songs to top the chart, elicits discussions about staleness and dormancy of modern rock radio.
- Tears for Fears releases their seventh studio album, and first studio album in 18 years, The Tipping Point. It debuts at number 8 on the Billboard 200, moving 31,000 album equivalent units. It become the band's highest ever charting debut, and their first in 30 years to debut in the top 10. It is also the best selling album of the week in pure sales as well.
- Guitarist Slash releases his fifth solo album, 4. It is his fourth solo album featuring vocalist Myles Kennedy of Alterbridge. The album debuts in the top 10 of ten separate national album charts.
- Jethro Tull releases their 22nd studio album, The Zealot Gene, their first in almost 18 years. It charts at number 9 on the UK OOC all-formal albums chart, making it their first album in 50 years to crack the top 10 of the UK albums chart.
- Eddie Vedder (of Pearl Jam) releases his third solo album, Earthling. It is the best selling album of the week in the US, topping the Billboard Top Album Sales chart with 16,000 copies sold.

=== March ===
- Swedish band Ghost release their fifth studio album, Impera. First started in 2020, the album's creation spanned 2 years as the band waited out the 2020 US Presidential Election season and some rougher parts of the COVID-19 pandemic. The latter inspired frontman Tobias Forge to revisit and complete an album idea he has had since 2014, about "the rise and fall of empires". The album debuts at number 2 on the Billboard 200 chart, moving 70,000 album equivalent units. The debut is the band best of their career in both chart position and units moved. It is the highest charting hard rock album since 2020's Power Up album by AC/DC, and the best selling hard rock album in over a year, since 2021's Medicine at Midnight album by the Foo Fighters. As of its March release, Impera was also the highest pure sales of 2022 of any album genre.
- Feeder releases their eleventh studio album, Torpedo. Described as "heavier but still melodic", the album is themed around the band's frustrations of not being able to perform live due to COVID-19 restrictions. It debuts at number 5 on the UK all-format Official Charts Company albums chart, their tenth album to place in the top ten of the chart.
- Machine Gun Kelly releases his sixth studio album, and second one of the rock genre. Originally announced as Born with Horns, it was later retitled to Mainstream Sellout. It tops the all-format US Billboard 200 albums chart upon release, moving 93,000 album equivalent units. It is the first rock album in over a year to top the chart, with the last ones being AC/DC and Kelly's own Tickets to My Downfall in 2020. Despite the success, Kelly announced that he would be returning to rap music for his future releases.
- Kid Rock's twelfth studio album, Bad Reputation, fails to debut in the top 200 albums of the Billboard 200 upon its release. His prior seven albums had all debuted in the top 10 of the chart. His turn towards politics was cited as a possible reason for the steep decline since prior albums.
- After its appearance in the March 2022 film The Batman, Nirvana's 1991 song "Something in the Way" appears on the Billboard Hot 100 all-format song chart at number 46. It is the first song of the band's to appear on the chart in 20 years, since 2002's "You Know You're Right", and the first time the song had ever appeared on the chart, with it never having been released as a single in the past.

=== April ===
- At the 2022 Grammy Awards, the Foo Fighters win all three rock music themed Grammy Awards - "Making a Fire" wins Best Rock Performance, "Waiting on a War" wins Best Rock Song, and Medicine at Midnight wins Best Rock Album.
- Colombian musician Juanes wins the Grammy Award for Best Latin Rock or Alternative Album with their release Origen.
- Red Hot Chili Peppers release their twelfth studio album, Unlimited Love. It is their first with guitarist John Frusciante since he rejoined the band in 2019. It tops the Billboard 200 albums chart upon its debut week, moving 97,500 album equivalent units. It is their second album to top the chart, and their first since 2006's Stadium Arcadium. Additionally, the album replacing Machine Gun Kelly's Mainstream Sellout as a chart topper makes it the first time since 2017 that the chart had back to back rock artists topping the chart, when Foo Fighters and The Killers did it with Concrete and Gold and Wonderful Wonderful respectively.
- Pink Floyd reunites to release a one-off song "Hey, Hey, Rise Up!". It is the band's first release of new music since 1994's The Division Bell. The song is in support of Ukraine in the 2022 Russian invasion of Ukraine, and feature vocals from Andriy Khlyvnyuk of the Ukrainian band Boombox.
- Jack White releases his first of two studio albums planned for 2022, Fear of the Dawn, the other being Entering Heaven Alive in July 2022. Fear of the Dawn debuts in the top ten of at least six separate national album charts.

=== May ===
- Guitarist Amen leaves Finnish band Lordi after disagreements with other band members.
- My Chemical Romance releases their first new song in 8 years, "The Foundations of Decay".
- The Black Keys release their eleventh studio album, Dropout Boogie. It debuted at number 8 on the Billboard 200, moving 33,000 album equivalent units. It is the band's sixth album to chart in the top 10 of the chart, and their second within a year, after Delta Kream in May 2021.
- Swedish band Draconian announce the departure of singer Heike Langhans, the return of Lisa Johansson on vocals, and the addition of guitarist Niklas Nord.

=== June ===
- British progressive rock band Porcupine Tree releases their first new studio album in 13 years, Closure/Continuation. The album was recorded intermittently over the course of a decade in complete secrecy while frontman Steven Wilson pursued a solo career and other members moved on to other projects. The COVID pandemic halted their other projects and allowed them the time to finally complete the album. The album title is self-referential to the fact that the band is uncertain if this is the end of the band's career, or the start of a new era. The album tops four separate national charts in Europe and peaks at number 2 in the UK, all career highs.
- Coheed and Cambria releases their tenth studio album, Vaxis - Act II: A Window of the Waking Mind. The album will continue the story of their long running series of concept albums, though frontman Claudio Sanchez notes that parts of the story are still in flux, as some plot points have felt insensitive in the wake of the COVID-19 pandemic.
- Many rock musicians speak out in protest against of the overturning of Roe v. Wade, including Tom Morello of Rage Against the Machine, Hayley Williams of Paramore, and Eddie Vedder of Pearl Jam. Billie Joe Armstrong of Green Day goes as far as saying he would renounce his own US citizenship over it.

=== July ===
- Shinedown releases their seventh studio album, Planet Zero. The album was initially scheduled to be released in late 2021, and then delayed to April 2022, before finally being released in July. It debuted at number 5 on the Billboard 200 chart, moving 43,000 album equivalent units. It's their fifth album to debut in the top 10 of the chart, but has a 17,000 unit drop from their prior album, 2018's Attention Attention.
- Jack White releases Entering Heaven Alive on July 22, 2022, his second album of the year. His first of the year, Fear of the Dawn, highlights a heavier sound, while Entering Heaven Alive features softer and acoustic music. Entering Heaven Alive debuts at number 9 on the Billboard 200, moving 27,000 album equivalent units.
- Dance Gavin Dance releases their tenth studio album, Jackpot Juicer. It debuts at number 8 on the Billboard 200 chart, moving 33,500 album equivalent units. It is the band's first album to debut in the top 10 of the chart.
- Rage Against the Machine plays their first live performance in over 11 years, and makes headlines for their commentary critical of the overturning of Roe v. Wade, including the catchphrase "Abort the Supreme Court". They also commit to giving almost half a million dollars in concert ticket revenue towards reproductive rights organizations.

=== August ===
- Panic! at the Disco releases their seventh studio album, Viva Las Vengeance. The album features work from Butch Walker who was said to add "a sound that showcases guitars and nods to the arena rock sound of decades past, primarily the 1970s". While the prior two studio albums topped the Billboard 200 chart, Viva Las Vengeance did not, and missed the top ten altogether, debuting at 13.
- Five Finger Death Punch releases their ninth studio album, AfterLife. The album is not a formal concept album, but was created as a cohesive unit. The album debuts at number 10 on the Billboard 200 chart, moving 29,000 album equivalent units. The debut is the highest rock album of the week on the chart, landing above Panic! at the Disco's Viva Las Vengeance, and also topping the Billboard Hot Hard Rock albums chart, but it still a drop from their prior album, F8, which moved 55,000 units in its first week.
- Muse releases their ninth studio album, Will of the People, becoming their seventh consecutive UK number one album, selling over 300,000 units by the start of 2023.
- Indian singer-songwriter Jaimin releases his debut studio album, Cutting Loose, on August 19. The record features contributions from notable musicians such as Rahul Ram and Susmit Bose. It earned high praise from rock legends Pete Townshend and John Sebastian and won Best Rock Album of the Year at the 2022 Clef Music Awards. The Quint described the release as "India's finest-ever album of original English songs".

=== September ===
- Swedish band Ghost's 2019 song "Mary on a Cross" goes viral on TikTok after a fan releases a slowed down version of the track. The band, in turn, officially releases their own slowed down version of the song, which goes on to top the Billboard Hot Hard Rock streaming songs chart, and eventually even find cross-over success, peaking at 90 on the all-format Billboard Hot 100 chart. The song is the band's first to reach the Hot 100 chart, despite not even being a single or their most recent studio album.
- Megadeth's sixteenth studio album, The Sick, the Dying... and the Dead! debuts at number 3 on the Billboard 200 chart, moving 43,000 album equivalent units. It is their first album in 6 years, and their eighth studio album to debut in the top 10 of the chart.
- Ozzy Osbourne releases his thirteenth studio album, Patient Number 9. It is his second album to be produced by Andrew Watt, and was recorded while Osbourne was struggling with medical issues affecting his physical health. The album debuts at number 3 on the Billboard 200 chart, moving 56,000 album equivalent units, and is his ninth album to debut in the top 10. It is also his highest ever charting album in the UK - debuting at number 2 - and hits the top 10 of over 13 other national album charts.
- Slipknot releases their seventh studio album, The End, So Far, on September 30, 2022. It is described by frontman Corey Taylor as a heavier version of their melodic album Vol. 3: The Subliminal Verses. It debuts at number 2 on the Billboard 200 chart, breaking the band's 3 album streak of topping the chart with All Hope is Gone (2008), .5: The Gray Chapter (2014), and We Are Not Your Kind (2019). The album does top the UK chart.

=== October ===
- Nothing More releases their sixth studio album, Spirits. It is their first since their 2017 Grammy nominated The Stories We Tell Ourselves and "Go to War".
- Alter Bridge releases their seventh studio album, titled Pawns & Kings. The album was written and recorded across the last few years as band members balanced it with their respective other musical projects.
- Red Hot Chili Peppers releases their second full-length, 17 track studio album of 2022, Return of the Dream Canteen.
- Blink 182 reforms their original lineup for the first time in a decade, with Tom Delonge rejoining Mark Hoppus and Travis Barker, and release their first new material as that trio in over a decade, named "Edging".
- British band Architects release their tenth studio album, The Classic Symptoms Of A Broken Spirit. The album is said to move further away from their prior metalcore sound into industrial music.
- King Gizzard & the Lizard Wizard releases three albums, Ice, Death, Planets, Lungs, Mushrooms and Lava, Laminated Denim, and Changes.

=== November ===
- The Smashing Pumpkins released their twelfth studio album, Atum: A Rock Opera in Three Acts. The album is described as a sequel concept album exploring concepts started in the band's prior concept albums Mellon Collie and the Infinite Sadness (1996) and Machina/The Machines of God. The release has an uncommon release format, entailing three separate 11 song releases in 11 week intervals, culminating in a boxset release that contains all 33 songs and an additional 10 exclusive songs. Atum: Act One released on November 15, 2022, while Atum: Act Two is scheduled for January 31, 2023, and Atum: Act Three and the box-set is scheduled for April 23, 2023.
- Nickelback released their tenth studio album, and first in 5 years, Get Rollin' on November 18, 2022.
- Disturbed releases their eighth studio album Divisive. Frontman David Draiman described the album as sounding like their older material, including their first (The Sickness) and third (Ten Thousand Fists) albums. The album is the bands first since their debut album to not debut in the top ten of the Billboard 200 albums chart, peaking at number 13.

=== December ===
- Metallica's song "Lux Aeterna" tops the Mainstream Rock chart, and starts a ten-week run at the top that goes into 2023.

== Major tours and concerts ==
- Coldplay begin the Music of the Spheres World Tour in Costa Rica on 18 March 2022.
- Weezer, Green Day, and Fall Out Boy reschedule the European leg of their joint Hella Mega Tour for 2021, and then again to 2022.
- My Chemical Romance reschedules their reunion tour for 2022. It was originally scheduled for 2020, but was delayed twice due to the COVID-19 pandemic.
- Rage Against the Machine reschedules their reunion tour for 2021, and then again for March 2022, both times due to the COVID-19 pandemic.
- Foo Fighters - delay the European leg of their Medicine at Midnight-supporting tour to 2022 due to the COVID-19 pandemic. Much of the year's touring was eventually cancelled after the death of member Taylor Hawkins.
- Aerosmith reschedules their 50th anniversary tour for September 2021, and then again for September 2022, when it is finally performed.
- Rammstein are scheduled to begin their European stadium tour on 15 May, after it was delayed by the COVID-19 pandemic.
- Aklasan Fest, the world's Filipino punk rock music festival in the US, returns after being cancelled two years in a row due to the COVID-19 pandemic.
- Emerson, Lake & Palmer member Carl Palmer announces a live concert in November 2022 of him performing the band's songs with high quality live performance video footage of Keith Emerson and Greg Lake performing, who both died in 2016.
- Nine Inch Nails performs a belated concert celebrating their 2020 induction into the Rock & Roll Hall of Fame that had been repeatedly delayed due to COVID, in September 2022. Frontman Trent Reznor recruits members from earlier lineups of the band to perform some songs, including Richard Patrick (of Filter) and Danny Lohner. Patrick even performs a cover of "Hey Man Nice Shot", the first single Patrick released in 1995 after deciding to break away from Nine Inch Nails to start his own band (Filter).

== Deaths ==
- 4 January – Andrzej Nowak, 63, Polish guitarist (TSA), composer and music producer
- 12 January – Ronnie Spector, 78, American singer and front woman of the Ronettes
- 21 January – Michael Lee Aday, 74, professionally known as Meat Loaf, American singer known for his top-selling album Bat Out of Hell
- 1 February – Hiroshima, Japanese drummer (G.I.S.M.). (death announced on this date)
- 9 February – Ian McDonald, 75, English multi-instrumentalist of King Crimson and Foreigner
- 10 February – Roman Kostrzewski, 61, Polish heavy metal musician (Kat)
- 19 February – Gary Brooker, 76, English pianist and frontman of Procol Harum
- 22 February – Mark Lanegan, 57, solo artist and frontman of Screaming Trees
- 25 March – Taylor Hawkins, 50, American drummer of the Foo Fighters
- 30 March – Jun Lopito, 64, Filipino guitarist
- 15 April – Koji, 49, Japanese guitarist of La'cryma Christi (esophageal cancer)
- 3 May – Valeri Kocharov, 74, Georgian rock guitarist and singer
- 26 May
  - Alan White, 72, English drummer of Yes
  - Andy Fletcher, 60, English musician and keyboardist for Depeche Mode
- 5 June – Alec John Such, 70, American bassist and founding member of Bon Jovi
- 23 June – Massimo Morante, 69, Italian guitarist (Goblin) and film composer
- 5 July – Manny Charlton, 80, Scottish rock guitarist (Nazareth).
- 22 August – Piotr Szkudelski, 66, Polish drummer (Perfect).
- 24 September – John Hartman, 72, American drummer and founding member of the Doobie Brothers
- 3 October – Mon Legaspi, 54, Filipino bassist of Wolfgang (cardiac arrest)
- 28 October - Jerry Lee Lewis, 87, American pianist and singer
- 6 November – Dan Fawcett, 52, Canadian guitarist (Helix) (murdered; body discovered on this date)
- 8 November - Dan McCafferty, 76, Scottish vocalist and founding member of Nazareth
- 10 November – Chris Koerts, 74, Dutch guitarist and composer (Earth and Fire).
- 18 November – Serhiy Stepanenko, 58, Ukrainian bass guitarist (Komu Vnyz)
- 20 November – Riho Sibul, 64, Estonian guitarist (Ultima Thule)
- 30 November - Christine McVie, 79, English singer-songwriter, keyboardist, and member of Fleetwood Mac
- 6 December (body found) – Hamish Kilgour, 65, New Zealand musician (The Clean)
- 31 December – Jeremiah Green, 45, American indie rock drummer (Modest Mouse)

== Band breakups ==
- Circa Survive (indefinite hiatus)
- Every Time I Die
- Sixx A.M.
- Tristania (Norwegian band)
