= Cutting Loose (album) =

Studio album by Jaimin
- Released: August 19, 2022
- Recorded: January–December 2021
- Studio: Thru the Lens (Kolkata)
- Genres: Soft rock; indie folk; folk rock; indie rock
- Length: 59:45
- Label: The Orchard

Singles from Cutting Loose
- 1. "Bucket of Pain" Released: June 18, 2022; 2. "She" Released: June 24, 2022; 3. "I'm Going Solo" Released: July 22, 2022; 4. "One More Night" Released: July 29, 2022; 5. "She's Running Late" Released: August 12, 2022

Professional ratings
Review scores
Source	Rating
God Is in the TV	8/10
A Humming Heart	7/10
The Indian Express	2.5/5 stars
Narendra Kusnur	5/5 stars

Cutting Loose is the debut studio album by Indian singer-songwriter Jaimin, released independently on August 19, 2022. It marks his first collection of original English songs.

== Background ==
In a musical landscape increasingly dominated by singles and EPs, Jaimin insisted on a 14-track, hour-long record, citing a desire for longevity and an engaging listening experience. Thematically, the album explores conflict, disappointment, and departure, reflected and presented in an old-school singer-songwriter style influenced by artists such as Buddy Holly, Bob Dylan, Mark Knopfler, Paul Simon, The Beatles, JJ Cale, Jackson Browne and John Prine.

The release of the full album was preceded by five singles: "Bucket of Pain", "She", "I'm Going Solo", "One More Night", and "She's Running Late". In 2023, the album received a CD release via Free School Records, with remastered audio.

== Writing ==
The material on Cutting Loose was composed over a span of seven years, beginning in 2015. The opening track, "Home," was the first song Jaimin ever wrote, which he noted explains its "unstructured nature." Many of the songs were written during his early years in Mumbai. Jaimin has described his songwriting process as "primal" stating that he prioritised intuitiveness over technical complexity.

== Recording ==
Production officially began in December 2020 and spanned eighteen months. The album was co-produced by guitarist Subharaj Ghosh, a graduate of Berklee College of Music, who Jaimin described as his "translator" for technical musical vocabulary. To achieve a unified sound, the two engaged in extensive brainstorming regarding instrumentation and tonal choices.

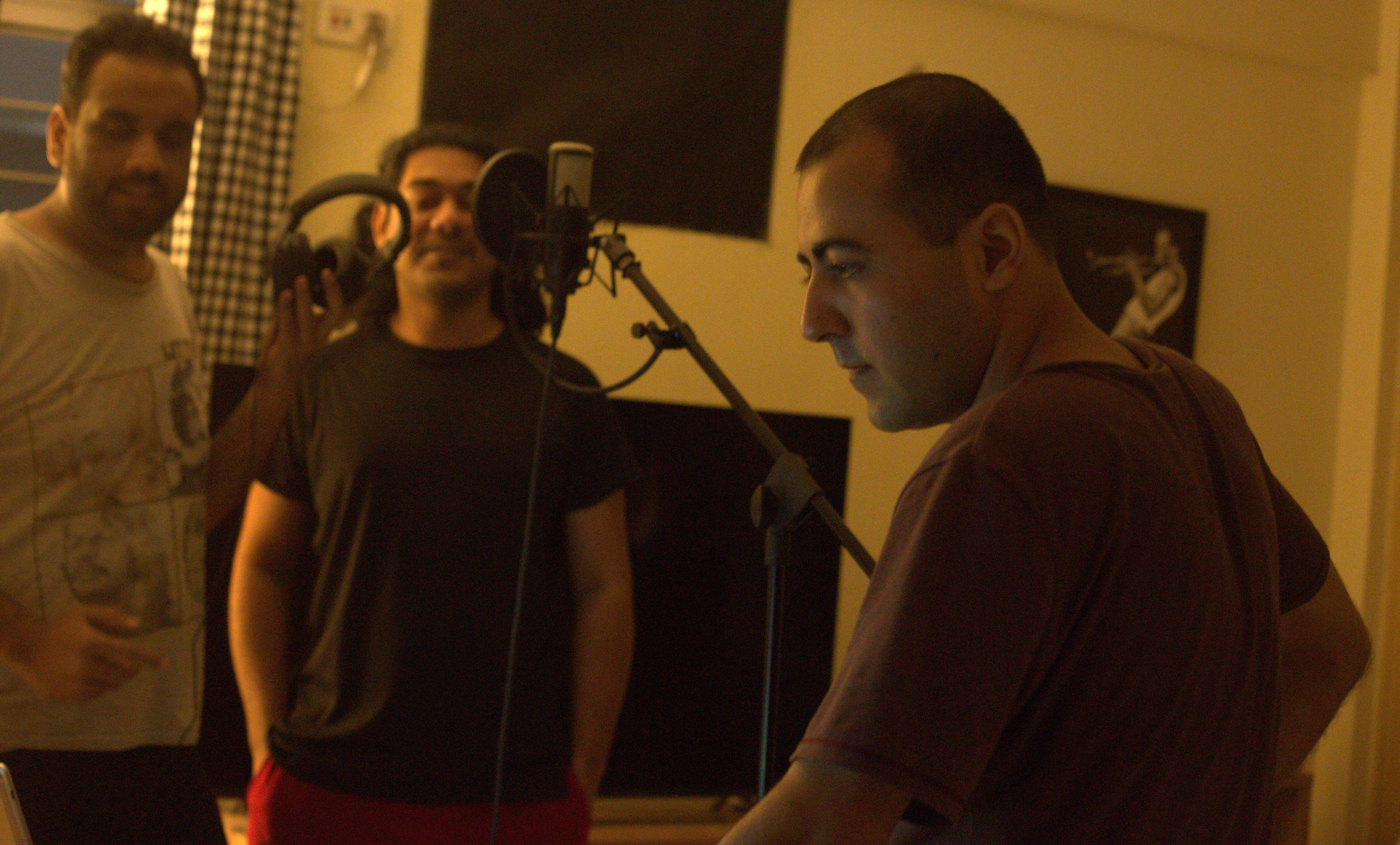
A studio recordings session in progress

The recording process was a DIY effort, largely taking place in a friend's apartment on the periphery of Kolkata to ensure a quiet environment. Due to the COVID-19 pandemic and geographic distances, most of the contributions from guest artists were recorded remotely.

The album features a diverse set of instruments, blending acoustic and electric guitars with harmonica, violin, sitar, saxophone, and "drunken synths." Despite the presence of seasoned jazz and rock musicians, Jaimin directed the arrangements to remain minimal and modest, avoiding virtuosic displays to maintain the album's introspective nature. Notably, Jaimin chose to sing in his natural conversational voice and accent, avoiding the "foreign twang" often associated with Indian artists performing in English, to maintain authenticity.

== Critical reception ==
Cutting Loose received widespread acclaim from music critics, with many highlighting its "literariness" and "sophistication". Jaideep Varma, writing for The Quint, called it an "unexpected masterpiece" and "India’s finest-ever album of original English songs," praising its lack of "filler" tracks and its "organic simplicity."

India Today: "An intricately crafted record, with hopeful refrains and a stream-of-consciousness lyricism lending it purpose and forward motion."

MoneyControl noted Jaimin as "a bright new star on the indie horizon", and described the album as having "hallmarks of ageless music", "suffused with intelligent instrumentation and a certain introspective quality that seems to have gone missing lately."

The Telegraph India lauded the album's honesty, describing it as "shimmering" and "quietly self-assured."

God Is in the TV: "The whole record is simply gorgeous."

Rolling Stone India characterised the debut as "wholesome" and "compelling".

Writing for The Indian Express, while Suanshu Khurana praised the "intelligent orchestration" and "compositional sophistication," she argued that the album "ended up just brushing past the genre it wants to be steeped in." Regarding the 8.5-minute track "She," she remarked that while it featured a "rich tapestry" of violin, the piece eventually "drags" and would have benefited from editing.

News9: "Jaimin Rajani is someone to watch out for."

Writing for The Statesman, veteran music critic Ian Zachariah noted the album as having "much more hit material than you get on a regular album", calling it the "album of the year."

The New Indian Express: "Cutting Loose is high on melody and emotions."

The album also gained recognition from international figures associated with the folk and rock movements of the 1960s and 70s.

Pete Townshend (of The Who) described the recordings as "beautiful" and noted that while the music is "gentle," the words "seem quite angry in places," naming "Something Here to Stay" as his favourite. Scarlet Rivera described Jaimin as a "seeker" whose songs take us on a journey of insights." Rock and Roll Hall of Fame inductee John Sebastian (of The Lovin' Spoonful) commended the "great writing, fingerpicking and singing" that are at the heart of the album. Rob Stoner described Jaimin's work as "melodic songs delivered tunefully".

== Packaging ==
The album's cover art features a surrealist collage against a cream-coloured textured background. The imagery consists of fragments of Jaimin's face — his eyes and mouth. A pale flower is placed over the left eye, while a dried, orange leaf covers the right. These elements are intended to symbolise pleasant and unpleasant experiences in life and love, aligning with the album's central theme.

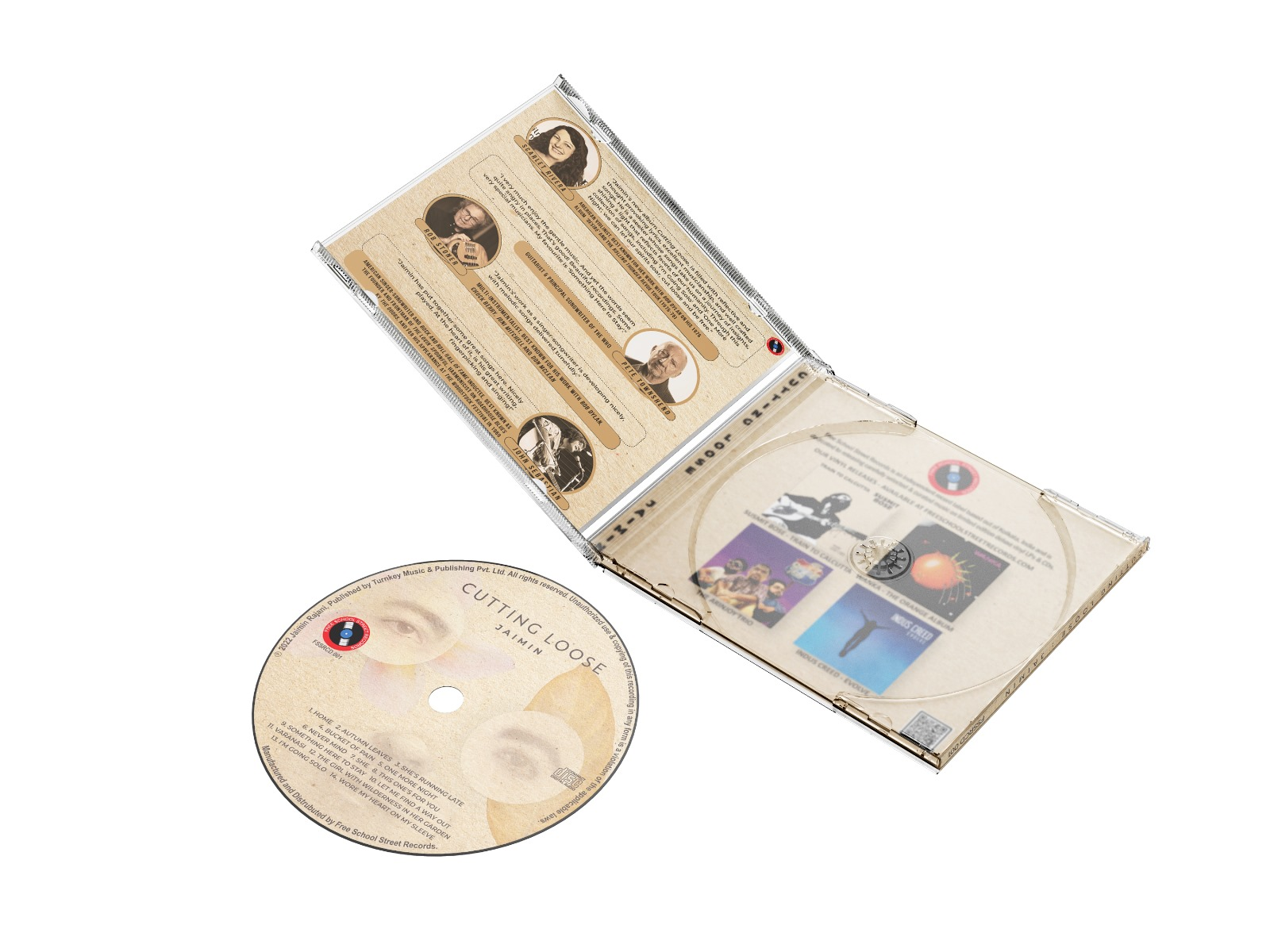
Cutting Loose CD and Inner Sleeve

The 2023 CD release features expanded design assets, including a multi-panel layout with a dedicated personnel sheet and a tracklist with song durations. The internal packaging includes a "Testimonials" page featuring endorsements from notable musicians.

== Track listing ==
All tracks are written by Jaimin.

Cutting Loose
No.	Title	Length
1.	"Home"	2:06
2.	"Autumn Leaves"	5:02
3.	"She's Running Late"	3:16
4.	"Bucket of Pain"	2:52
5.	"One More Night"	3:46
6.	"Never Mind"	5:23
7.	"She"	8:30
8.	"This One's for You"	5:40
9.	"Something Here to Stay"	4:02
10.	"Let Me Find a Way Out"	3:04
11.	"Varanasi"	1:52
12.	"The Girl with Wilderness in Her Garden"	6:18
13.	"I'm Going Solo"	3:04
14.	"Wore My Heart on My Sleeve"	4:50
Total length:		59:45

== Personnel ==
Musicians

- Jaimin – vocals, guitar, harmonica
- Subharaj Ghosh – guitar, bass, backing vocals
- Arka Chakraborty – piano, organ, synths, bass
- Aniruddha Saha – drums, percussion
- Arjun Chakraborty – drums, percussion
- Ralph Pais – bass
- Rohan Ganguli – bass
- Rajarshi Das – violin
- Protyay Chakraborty – violin

Guest musicians

- Rahul Ram – bass on "She's Running Late"
- Patrick Fitzsimons – mandolin on "Bucket of Pain" and "She's Running Late"
- Billy Cardine – resonator guitar on "Bucket of Pain"
- Deepak Castelino – classical guitar on "Home"
- Abhay Sharma – saxophone on "Something Here to Stay"
- Kalyan Majumdar – sitar on "Something Here to Stay"
- Bachospati Chakraborty – bass on "Wore My Heart on My Sleeve"
- Bibhubrata Acharjee – backing vocals on "Home", "Bucket of Pain" and "The Girl with Wilderness in Her Garden"
- Susmit Bose – backing vocals on "Never Mind"
- Rajshekhar Banerjee – backing vocals on "One More Night"

Engineers

- Protyay Chakraborty – engineering, mixing, mastering
- Subharaj Ghosh – recording and additional mastering engineer

Artwork

- Visal A Chattopadhyay– front cover photo and album design
- Rajiv Pandey – inner sleeve photo on CD edition

Music Video

- Filmed by Ivor Houston
- Edited by Suyash Modi
