= H. Y. Sharada Prasad =

Indian civil servant, journalist and writer

- Born: 15 April 1924; Bangalore, Karnataka, India
- Died: 2 September 2008 (aged 84); New Delhi, India
- Resting place: Dayanand Muktidham Crematorium, Delhi
- Occupations: Civil servant Writer; Journalist
- Known for: Association with Indira Gandhi
- Parent(s): Holenarasipura Yoganarasimham; Saraswathy
- Awards: Padma Bhushan
- Website: H Y Sharada Prasad

Holenarasipur Yoganarasimham Sharada Prasad (15 April 1924 – 2 September 2008) was an Indian civil servant, journalist and writer, best known as the media adviser to Indira Gandhi, former Prime Minister of India. He also served as the media adviser to Rajiv Gandhi, during Rajiv's tenure as the Indian Prime Minister.

== Background and personal life ==
Born in Bangalore on 15 April 1924, he was given the personal name "Sharada Prasad" by his parents. His family hailed from the town of Holenarasipura in Hassan district of present-day Karnataka state, and his father's name was Yoganarasimham. Therefore, according to the naming convention prevalent in Karnataka, his full name became "Holenarasipura Yoganarasimham Sharada Prasad" or "H.Y. Sharada Prasad."

Sharada Prasad was born into an educated south Indian Mulukanadu Brahmin family whose mother-tongue is Telugu but Kannadigas in true sense and have been settled in Holenarasipura in the Kingdom of Mysore for at least a couple of centuries. His father, Holenarasipura Yoganarasimham, was a school master, while his mother Saraswathy, was a home-maker. Sharada Prasad was the eldest of their nine children. Among his brothers was the noted botanist, the late Professor H.Y. Mohan Ram, who was the father of Indian Ocean's Rahul Ram.

== Career ==
Sharada Prasad was educated mainly in Bangalore. He then started his career as a journalist at the Indian Express Group and later joined the Publications Division of the Government of India as an assistant editor. Later, he served as the editor of Yojana, the official journal of the Planning Commission of India. His stint as the editor of the journal was reported to have brought him to Indira Gandhi's notice, and she invited him to join her staff as the media adviser.

During his tenure with Indira Gandhi, Sharada Prasad was known to have assisted in the establishment of two notable institutions, the Indian Institute of Mass Communication and the National Institute of Design. The Government of India awarded him the third highest civilian honour of the Padma Bhushan, in 1999, for his contributions to society.

Sharada Prasad died, aged 84, on 2 September 2008, due to age-related illnesses, survived by his wife and two sons. His life has been documented in his memoirs, A Window on the Wall and a series of newspaper articles under the title, The Book I Won't Be Writing.

== See also ==
- Indian Institute of Mass Communication
- National Institute of Design
- Inna Rammohan Rao
