= Nijeder Mawte Nijeder Gaan =

- Nijeder Mawte Nijeder Gaan thumbnail

Song by Citizens United
- Language: Bengali
- English title: Our song about our views
- Released: 24 March 2021
- Length: 6:32
- Label: Anupam Roy Creations
- Composer: Subhadeep Guha
- Lyricist: Anirban Bhattacharya

Music video
- "Nijeder Mawte Nijeder Gaan" on YouTube

"Nijeder Mawte Nijeder Gaan" (Bengali: "নিজেদের মতে নিজেদের গান", transl. "Our song about our views"), is a 2021 Indian Bengali-language socio-political song released on social media by a platform named Citizens United, on 24 March 2021, just 3 days before Phase-I of 2021 West Bengal Legislative Assembly election held on 27 March 2021.

The song is a plea by the artistes to the people of Bengal to vote wisely. The message of the song is anti-BJP. However it does not name the party explicitly. The song also rebukes the 'ideology of hatred', highlighting the need to stop the 'fascist forces'. The song strongly criticises the RSS and the BJP-led governments at the Centre and the various states.

== Background ==
In 2020, amid the Citizenship Amendment Act protests, Anirban Bhattacharya penned a poem in support of the protesters. He recited the poem on various occasions over the course of the protests. He along with his friend, Subhadeep Guha wanted to record the poem as a song. Their plans were hindered by the ongoing COVID-19 pandemic in India and the resulting lockdowns. The song was finally recorded in early March 2021, just in time to release before the elections in the state. According to Anirban, the song was his contribution to the CAA-NRC movement.

== Music video ==
=== Features ===
The music video was shot in various locations across Kolkata including the Chinese Kali Bari, College Street and Jadavpur University highlighting the inclusive social fabric of Kolkata and West Bengal. It features books on the Constitution of India, Raktakarabi by Rabindranath Tagore among several others. It also extends support to the LGBTQ community, the farmer protestors and the individuals affected by CAA. Although, no Indian political party is mentioned by name, the Rashtriya Swayamsevak Sangh is mentioned once. It contains visuals of Nazi Germany interspersed with those from present-day India and invokes the legacy of Nazi Minister of propaganda Joseph Goebbels. At a point the Bengali song transitions into Faiz Ahmed Faiz's Hum Dekhenge. The video ends with a screening of the preamble of the Indian constitution.

=== Cast ===
List of performers appearing in the video (in order of appearance):

- Riddhi Sen
- Rwitobroto Mukherjee
- Surangana Bandyopadhyay
- Ujan Chatterjee
- Subhadeep Guha
- Arun Mukhopadhyay
- Rudraprasad Sengupta
- Anirban Bhattacharya
- Parambrata Chattopadhyay
- Suman Mukhopadhyay
- Sabyasachi Chakraborty
- Rahul Arunoday Banerjee
- Anupam Roy
- Anindya Chatterjee
- Rupankar Bagchi
- Shaantilal Mukherjee
- Koushik Sen
- Chandan Sen
- Debraj Bhattacharya
- Sampa Biswas
- Debleena Dutt Mukherjee
- Reshmi Sen
- Piya Chakraborty
- Sanorita Garu

=== Song credits ===
- Lyrics: Anirban Bhattacharya
- Composer: Subhadeep Guha
- Singers: Arko Mukhaerjee, Subhadeep Guha, Anirban Bhattacharya, Anupam Roy, Anindya Chattopadhyay, Rupankar Bagchi, Debraj Bhattacharya, Sampa Biswas, Surangana Bandyopadhyay, Ujan Chatterjee, Rwitobroto Mukherjee, Riddhi Sen

=== Video credits ===
- Directed by: Riddhi Sen, Rwitobroto Mukherjee
- Screenplay: Riddhi Sen, Rwitobroto Mukherjee, Surangana Bandyopadhyay

== Reception ==
The song received a lot of appreciation from social media users and received more than 1 lakh views within an hour of its upload on YouTube.

The line "Ami onyo kothao jabona, ami ei deshe tei thakbo", meaning "I won't go anywhere else and would continue to live in this country" slamming the narratives of 'Urban Naxals', 'anti-nationals', and 'go to Pakistan' that protestors and dissenters of the government are frequently targeted with, received significant praise from viewers.

In response to the song, then BJP MP Babul Supriyo and candidate for Legislative Assembly Rudranil Ghosh released a song titled "Didi tumi amader bhalobashona", meaning "Didi you don't love us" referring to chief minister Mamata Banerjee, popularly known as Didi. The music video also featured actress Rupa Bhattacharya.

== See also ==
- No Vote To BJP
