= H.Y. Mohan Ram =

Indian botanist (1930-2018)

Holenarasipur Yoganarasimham Mohan Ram (24 September 1930 - 18 June 2018) was an Indian botanist who influenced numerous students as a professor of Botany at Delhi University. His research areas included studies in floral biology, plant physiology, insectivorous plants and on the family Podostemaceae. He was a brother of H. Y. Sharada Prasad and the father of Indian Ocean's Rahul Ram.

Mohan Ram was born in Karnataka and grew up in Mysuru where he studied at the Saradavilas High School (1943–46) and Intermediate College (1946–48), receiving his bachelor of science degree from St. Philomena's College, Mysore and a master's degree in Botany from the Balwant Rajput College, Agra in 1953. He then joined as a lecturer in Botany at University of Delhi and worked on seed development in the Acanthaceae under Professor Panchanan Maheswari. He subsequently worked at Cornell University as a Fulbright Scholar with F.C. Steward and became a specialist in tissue culture. He also worked at the Laboratoire de Physiologie Pluricellulaire with J.P. Nitsch.

Professor Mohan Ram published over 240 research papers and edited four books while also guiding 32 PhD students. He helped in the establishment of the Department of Genetics and Environmental Biology at Delhi University. He was an honorary scientist of the Indian National Science Academy from 2006 and was a vice-president of Indian Academy of Sciences between 1988 and 1990. He was the chairman of the NCERT biology textbook committee from 1986 to 1988. He was awarded the JC Bose Award in 1979, the Om Prakash Bhasin Award (1986), the Sergei Nawashin Medal of the USSR (1990) and numerous other recognitions.
