= Kaun =

Kaun may refer to:

== Art and entertainment ==
- Kaun?, a 1999 Hindi film
- Kaun? Kaisey?, a 1983 Hindi film
- Kaun (song), a song by Indian Ocean from album Kandisa

== Other uses ==
- The Old Norse name of the k rune; see Kaunan
- Káun, the Hungarian name of Căoi village, Vețel Commune, Hunedoara County, Romania
- The ICAO location identifier for Auburn Municipal Airport
- KAUN-LD, an American low-power television station
- Sasha Kaun (born 1985), Russian basketball player
- Kaun (wrestler), an American professional wrestler
