= Local (novel) =

Novel by Jaideep Varma

- Author: Jaideep Varma
- Publication date: 2005
- Publication place: India

Local is a novel by Jaideep Varma, written in 2001 (with subsequent drafts) and published by Indialog Publications in 2005.

The book recounts the story of a white collar employee, Akash, who chooses to live on a local train in Mumbai as a homeless man. He does so to solve his accommodation and commuting issues (both massive problems in Mumbai) but also to get relief from a personal pain that being constantly in motion provides him. The contradictions of his two lives (as a multinational employee during the day and a homeless man with no possessions in the night) change him forever.

A striking feature of the book is its format: the main narrative is punctuated by short stories about characters Akash meets both on the train and in his office, with those characters then taking center stage.

The book received good reviews when it was published in 2005, but has subsequently gone out of print.
