= Hum Pardesi Ho Gaye =

- Genre: Drama
- Written by: Vipul Shah
- Directed by: Sanjay Upadhyay
- Starring: Kartika Rane; Aashish Chaudhary; Perizaad Zorabian
- Opening theme: "Hum Pardesi Ho Gaye" by Sukriti Sen
- Country of origin: India
- Original language: Hindi
- No. of seasons: 1
- No. of episodes: 52

Production
- Producer: Shobhana Desai
- Camera setup: Multi-camera
- Running time: 22 minutes
- Production company: Shobhana Desai Productions

Original release
- Network: Sony Entertainment Television
- Release: 2001 – 2002

Hum Pardesi Ho Gaye (transl. We became foreigner) is a Hindi language Indian television series that aired on Sony Entertainment Television, which premiered on 4 March 2001. The series was produced by Shobhana Desai, it starred Kartika Rane, Aashish Chaudhary, and Perizaad Zorabian. The series was nominated for numerous award categories at the time it was on-air, such as Prasoon Joshi was nominated for "TV Lyricist of the Year" award and Sanjay Upadhyay was nominated for "TV Director of the Year" award at the Indian Telly Awards in 2002.

== Plot ==
Shot extensively on locations abroad, Hum Pardesi Ho Gaye showed the story of a young, educated, Indian girl Mallika, who is hurriedly married to an NRI Rahul, within a short span of 10 days.

After marriage and moving abroad with him, she learns that he is in love with another woman (Maya). Mallika tries hard but just cannot seem to make any inroads into Rahul’s heart! Maya on the other hand is oblivious to Mallika’s existence and thinks that Rahul is all hers.

== Cast ==
- Kartika Rane as Mallika
- Aashish Chaudhary as Rahul
- Perizaad Zorabian as Maya
- Sulbha Arya
- Rakesh Pandey
- Manoj Joshi
- Mandeep Bhander
- Amit Thakur
- Sushama Prakash
