= Kartika Rane =

Indian television actress (born 1977)

- Born: 17 March 1977 (age 49); Goa, India
- Other name: Kartikadevi Rane
- Occupation: Actress
- Years active: 1994–2008

Kartika Rane (born 17 March 1977) is an Indian actress. Rane began her career as Yamunabai in historical drama, The Great Maratha. She found success in her roles as Antara in Ek Se Badkar Ek, Lieutenant Maya in Captain Vyom, and Mallika in Hum Pardesi Ho Gaye. Following this breakthrough, she appeared in Hindi movies, Yash, Hulla and Marathi movie, Saatchya Aat Gharat.

== Career ==
While studying in the first year of college, she was persuaded by a model friend to try out modelling. As a model, she worked with multiple agencies, including McCann Erickson, O&M, ICI, Lintas, HTA, Chaitra Leo Burnett and advertised products including Forhans, Dulux, Fair & Lovely, Rin and Vim.

While working as an advertising model, Rane was spotted by producer and director, B. R. Chopra. Chopra signed her for the weekly countdown show, Ek Se Badkar Ek. The show turned out to be a breakout role for her. Reflecting on her career after her role in Ek Se Badkar Ek, Rane said, "If the serial sounded good and my role was meaty, I signed it. After all, since I had decided to work on television, I didn’t want any good opportunities to pass me by". In late 90s, her career included serialised roles such as Satyabhama in Mahabharat Katha and Lieutenant Maya in the sci-fi series, Captain Vyom. The success earned her a debut in Bollywood with movie, Yash (1996). However the film was a critical and commercial failure. During this period, she also worked on various anthology series, Saturday Suspense, Rishtey, Gubbare.

In 2000s, Rane continued her television work with series like Hum Pardesi Ho Gaye and Nyaay. Unlike her early career, she said, "Unless I am comfortable and confident about the part I am playing, I say no. A role must give me professional satisfaction." She also worked in a Marathi movie, Saatchya Aat Gharat (2004) and a Hindi movie, Hulla (2008).

== Personal life ==
Rane is a native of Goa. Her uncle is Pratapsingh Rane, the ex-Chief Minister of Goa. She is a sociology graduate from Sophia College.

== Film ==
Year	Title	Role	Notes	Ref(s)
1996	Yash	Angel	Hindi debut	
2004	Saatchya Aat Gharat	Madhura	Marathi debut	
2008	Hulla	Abha		

== Television ==
Year	Title	Role	Notes	Ref(s)
1994	The Great Maratha	Yamunabai	Main role	
1995	Mano Ya Na Mano	Neenu	Episodes: 51–55	
1996	Ek Se Badkar Ek	Antara	Main role	
1997–1998	Mahabharat Katha	Satyabhama	Main role	
1998	Captain Vyom	Maya/Chaya	Main role	
1999	Saturday Suspense	Shreya / Rushali	Episodes: Episode 1 – "My Last Birthday", Episode 85 – "Raktarekha"	
1999	Rishtey	Veera	Episode: Episode 58 – "Highway"	
1999	Janam	Neha	Main role	
2000	Gubbare	Mohini	Episode: Episode 6 – "Jhooth"	
2000	Nyaay	Nandita	Main role	
2001–2002	Hum Pardesi Ho Gaye	Mallika	Main role	
2001–2002	Kangan	Chadni	Main role	
