= Impact Index =

Impact Index is an alternative statistical system in cricket. It was conceived by Jaideep Varma in March 2009 and unveiled in July that same year at the ICC Centenary Conference at Oxford.

The system measures the contribution of each player in the context of the impact that he has on the match, as opposed to the standard cricket statistics of batting average and bowling averaged or strike rate. It compares each player's performance relative to the other 21 players in the match, and for career assessments, it places a higher value for performances that affect the series or tournament result for his team.

In 2010, the T20 version of Impact Index was used as an “Official Stats Partner” for the Radiant Twenty20 USA tournament in the United States. The system was used to give out all the individual awards in the tournament.

When applied over the history of One Day International (ODI) cricket in January 2011, it determined that Viv Richards was the greatest ODI player of all time. ESPNCricinfo came to the same conclusion through their studies six years later.

This is the most written-about analytics system in cricket. After being on the front page of The Times of India, it also became the first (and only, till date) analytics system to be mentioned in the Wisden Almanack (in 2012). It has also been quoted on BBC World Service, had two dedicated shows on NDTV, been quoted on ESPNCricinfo and Star Sports, collaborated with Yahoo!, covered in Forbes and on CNBC and various other publications, Indian and international.

Jaideep Varma and Soham Sarkhel ran it out of Mumbai till mid-2014.

In June 2014, Impact Index became a part of Fidelis World and a sister company of Wisden India, functioning from Bangalore.

In February 2017, Impact Index released their first book, co-written with writer/ commentator/ ex-cricketer Aakash Chopra, published by HarperCollins, called "Numbers Do Lie: 61 Hidden Cricket Stories". The book claims to change cricket history by challenging fondly-held notions about the sport. The book was well-reviewed and its launch discussions brought in eminent cricketers and commentators as Matthew Hayden, Sanjay Manjrekar, Harsha Bhogle, VVS Laxman, Ravichandran Ashwin and Zaheer Khan.

Cricket legend Greg Chappell had this to say after reading the book - ""This book has started a fascinating conversation that will change the face of the way we look at the game and those who have played it."
