= Captain Vyom =

Indian TV series

- Captain Vyom
- Genre: Action; Science fiction
- Created by: Ketan Mehta
- Starring: Milind Soman; Kartika Rane
- Opening theme: "Captain Vyom"
- Country of origin: India
- Original language: Hindi
- No. of seasons: 1
- No. of episodes: 54

Production
- Running time: Approx. 24 minutes

Original release
- Network: DD National
- Release: 4 January 1998 – 1999

Captain Vyom is an Indian television series aired on DD National in 1998. It was directed by Ketan Mehta and starred Milind Soman.

== Plot ==
By 2123, humanity has conquered the Solar System, with space stations established on several planets. Earth is governed by the World Government, headquartered at Delhi.

Maya travels from Earth to Mars when a meteor strikes her spacecraft, unknowingly carrying an alien life-form aboard. After landing, she meets Astro Guru (Shrivallabh Vyas), the world's oldest and wisest man, a scientist and astrologer attempting to reconcile physics and philosophy. Maya then travels to Io, Jupiter's moon, to become jailer of the Solar System's most secure prison, which holds 12 of the Universe's most dangerous criminals in an incapacitated state: Teja/Tejang, keeper of light; Mohini, the hypnotist; Paras, the alchemist; Morpho, the shape-shifter; Kineto, master of telekinesis; Sonic, lord of soundwaves; Venom, the toxicologist; Chhalasur, the illusionist; Durgati, the biologist; Computo, the cyborg; Gravito, the gravity expert; and Vikaal/Chronos, a space-time traveller.

The alien life-form enters the prison through Maya's boots. An ensuing meteor shower awakens the prisoners, who use their abilities to disable the security system and escape. Captain Vyom (Milind Soman), a super-soldier assigned by the World Government and Vishwapramukh - the world President (Tom Alter), is ordered to recapture them. Unaware of his parentage and believing himself an orphan, Vyom was raised in a monastery in Ladakh and developed superpowers through Yoga. He assembles a team of specially trained soldiers: pilot Pablo (Vinod Pandit), criminal-psychology expert Lieutenant Maya (Kartika Rane), weapons expert Captain Blaze (Aarav Chowdhary), medic Dr. Zen (Divya Palat), engineer Fuller (Sanjeev Vatsa), android Syd-E (Shehzaad Saeed), and Surya (Jeto Sanjana). They pursue the fugitives aboard Ulka (उल्का, meaning meteor), a spacecraft designed by Fuller. One by one, the criminals are captured or killed and, where possible, returned to prison.

Eventually, Vyom must travel through time to pursue Vikaal (Rahul Bose), who intends to kill Chandrakanth Shastri, the future Astro Guru, and alter history. While protecting Shastri, Vyom encounters his look-alike, Dr. Om Swaroop (Milind Soman). He remains in the past to investigate and discovers that Swaroop is his biological father, prompting him to seek the truth about his mother.

The conspiracy behind the criminals' transformation into evil and their subsequent escape was orchestrated by Kaala Saaya, emperor of the Parajeevs, an advanced race of seventh-dimensional body parasites. They seek a substance found only in human brains that enables them to live for thousands of years. Kaala Saaya sends his daughter Parchhayee (Nethra Raghuraman) to kill Dr. Om Swaroop, the only person who knows how to use the advanced G-gun, a weapon capable of defeating the Parajeevs. However, Parchhayee falls in love with Swaroop and turns against her father, protecting him before he is taken to another dimension beyond the Parajeevs' reach. With knowledge of the G-gun, Vyom helps humanity win its first war against the aliens, an event that unites the world's nations and ultimately leads to the formation of the World Government. In exile with Swaroop, Parchhayee gives birth to Vyom, making him half-alien.

In the present, Kaala Saaya sends a Parajeev agent to sabotage Ulka, but Dr. Zen captures him. After Vyom returns from the past and questions him, the agent offers to reveal how to reach the seventh dimension and defeat the Parajeevs, but only to Astro Guru. He discloses the information to Astro Guru's virtual form before committing suicide.

Astro Guru then sends Vyom and his crew to obtain four objects needed to enter the seventh dimension and defeat the Parajeevs: a weapon, a jewel serving as an inter-dimensional compass, a herb allowing humans to breathe there, and fuel for Ulka. The crew divides into groups. Maya and Blaze seek the weapon; Zen and Pablo the herb; Fuller and Syd-E the fuel; and Vyom searches alone for the jewel. Maya and Zen are captured during their missions, while their partners return with the required objects. Fuller is killed by a man-eating tree while obtaining the fuel, which Syd-E retrieves.

Vyom sets out to confront the Parajeevs and is taken to another dimension, where his parents give him a crystal capable of weakening Kaala Saaya's shield. Armed with it, Vyom defeats the emperor, who reveals that Vyom is his grandson and heir to the seventh dimension. Kaala Saaya persuades him to accept the throne. The series ends with Vyom becoming the new emperor, reflecting on his past adventures and hoping to reunite with his parents in another dimension. Meanwhile, Maya and Zen agree to dates with Blaze and Pablo, respectively.

== Cast ==
- Milind Soman as Captain Vyom / Dr. Om Swaroop
- Kartika Rane as Lieutenant Maya / Chaya
- Aarav Chowdhary as Captain Blaze
- Divya Palat aa Dr. Zen
- Sanjeev Vatsa as Fuller
- Vinod Pandit as Pablo
- Shahzad Saeed as SYD-E, the android
- Jeto Sanjana as Surya
- Perizaad Zorabian as Shakti
- Aditya Sharma as Teja / Tejang, the keeper of light
- Malvika Singh as Mohini, the hypnotist
- Abhimanyu Raj Singh as Paras, the alchemist
- Andy Tharane as Morpho, the shape-shifter
- Ravi Khare as Kineto, Master of telekinetic abilities
- Dino Morea as Sonic, the Lord of soundwaves
- Madhu Sapre and Achint Kaur as Venom, the toxicologist
- Faredon Bhoojwala as Chhalasur, the illusionist
- Sushmita Mukherjee as Durgati, the biologist
- Rajiv Kumar as Computo, the cyborg
- Joy Fernandes as Gravito, the gravity expert
- Rahul Bose and Ken Phillips as Vikaal / Chronos, the space and time-traveler
- Tom Alter as Vishwapramukh, the world President
- Shrivallabh Vyas as Astro Guru / Chandrakant Shastri
- Rahul Singh as Chandrakant Shastri 'Chandu'
- Nethra Raghuraman as Parchhayee / Dr. Naina
- Kaala Saya (Sanjeev Vatsa)
- Sunil Rege as Maya and Chaya's father

== Production ==
The futuristic science fiction show was conceived by Ketan Mehta. The special effects were created by Maya Entertainment Ltd. jointly owned by the National Film Development Corporation and Mehta. The series costed three times than the average production at that time due to special effects.

Model and actor Milind Soman was roped in to play the protagonist of the series.

== Release and reception ==
The series aired in India on DD1 every Sunday 10 am in late 1998. The series received favorable response from audience and critics. It had considerable fan following in the 1990s. The series had rerun on SAB TV. In 2008, Soman expressed his willingness to star in the second season, film or video game if ever produced.

The remastered series was uploaded as a web series from 22 June 2016 to 13 June 2017 on YouTube channel WOW TEENZ by Cosmos Maya.

== Spin-off comics ==
A comics based on the television series was published by Diamond Comics in English and several other Indian languages. The comics maintained the storyline of the original television series.

== Future ==
In June 2022, it was announced that Brewing Thoughts Pvt Ltd has acquired the remake rights of Captain Vyom from Maya Entertainment Ltd and they have announced that they will make 5 films and a 5 season show based on the 1998 TV show.
