= Yash (film) =

- Directed by: Sharad Sharan
- Written by: Saheem Jha
- Produced by: Sushilkumar Agrawal
- Starring: Bijay Anand; Kartika Rane; Ajit Vachani; Sonu Walia
- Cinematography: Faroukh Mistry
- Edited by: Kuldip K. Mehan
- Music by: Tabun Sutradhar
- Production company: Ultra Films
- Distributed by: Ultra Films
- Release date: 30 August 1996
- Country: India
- Language: Hindi

Yash is a 1996 Indian Hindi-language musical film directed by Sharad Saran. It stars Bijay Anand, Kartika Rane, Sonu Walia, Mangal Dhillon, Dina Pathak, Parikshit Sahni, Ajit Vachani in pivotal roles. The film was a box office failure.

== Synopsis ==
Vikram Arora is a talented singer, unknown however in the singing world. Kalpana , the daughter of Kailashnath Sahay who is the owner of a singing company, is however won over by his singing and marries him against her father's wishes. They have a son whom they name Yash. As time passes Kalpana realises that she has married the wrong man. She leaves her husband and son and returns to her father's house. Kalpana's desertion is a real challenge for Vikram and after sending Yash to a hostel, he works hard and eventually becomes the owner of a company. Yash turns out to be a handsome young man in love with a girl, Angel, who is the daughter of a music teacher. Yash now feels rejected by both his parents - his mother who is more in love with money and his father who has fallen in love with Asha. After taking training in music from Mr. Joseph, he becomes a pop singer and gets a lot of fame. Seeing this, his mother and grandfather wish to bring him into their company, but he refuses. In order to take revenge, Kailashnath destroys Vikram. When Yash learns of this, he comes to his father's help.

== Cast ==
- Bijay Anand as Yash Kumar
- Kartika Rane as Angel
- Sonu Walia as Kalpana Arora
- Mangal Dhillon as Vikram Arora
- Ajit Vachani as Kailashnath Sahay
- Dina Pathak as Daadi Maa
- Dilip Joshi as Gopi
- Mushtaq Khan as Sharafat Ali
- Prithvi Zutshi as Gautam Kumar Verma
- Parikshit Sahni as R.K. Joseph
- Dilip Dhawan as Balraj Sahay
- Mulraj Rajda as Postman (Uncredited)

== Soundtrack ==
The songs were composed by Tabun Sutradhar.

Song	Singer
"Zindagi Ek Geet Hai"	Abhijeet
"Yaaron Na Jaane"	Abhijeet
"Akela Tu Hi Nahin"	Kumar Sanu
"Yeh Kya Hua"	Kumar Sanu, Alisha Chinai
"L O V E Matlab Pyar"	Udit Narayan, Sadhana Sargam
"Subah Subah Jab"	Shankar Mahadevan, Jojo
"Rock-N-Roll"	Jojo
