= Ek Se Badkar Ek =

- Written by: Madhulika Verma; Rauf Ahmed
- Directed by: Mukul Anand; Ravi Chopra
- Starring: Kartika Rane; Tiku Talsania; Ravi Baswani; Jagdeep; Asrani; Rajesh Puri; Shankar Mahadevan
- Country of origin: India
- Original language: Hindi

Production
- Production company: BR Films

Original release
- Network: Doordarshan
- Release: 1995

Ek Se Badkar Ek is an Indian show launched in 1995 on Doordarshan. The show was sponsored by BPL, and initially directed by Mukul Anand.

The initial episodes of the serial were written by journalists Madhulika Verma and Rauf Ahmed.

The programme's protagonist is Antara, played by Kartika Rane, who is a love interest of two of her uncle's tenants, played by Tiku Talsania and Ravi Baswani, living in the house haunted by a ghost named Raja.

After Mukul Anand's death, the production house was taken over by BR Films, and the series was then directed by Ravi Chopra.

== Cast ==
- Kartika Rane as Antra
- Tiku Talsania as Brij Mohan
- Ravi Baswani as Rahul
- Jagdeep as Contractor Khanna
- Asrani as Raja (Ghost)
- Rajesh Puri as Kanti Lal
- Shankar Mahadevan
