= Leaving Home: The Life & Music of Indian Ocean =

- Directed by: Jaideep Varma
- Produced by: D. Ramakrishna; Jaideep Varma
- Starring: Susmit Sen; Asheem Chakravarty; Rahul Ram; Amit Kilam
- Cinematography: Gargey Trivedi; Paramvir Singh
- Edited by: Nimish Gaur
- Music by: Indian Ocean
- Release date: 24 October 2008
- Running time: 115 minutes
- Country: India
- Language: English

Leaving Home: The Life & Music of Indian Ocean is a full-length documentary film on the Indian music band Indian Ocean, directed by Jaideep Varma.

The film was shot in 2006 and edited in 2007/8. It made history in 2010 by becoming the first documentary film in the history of Indian cinema to release nationally in theatres.

Besides travelling to a few film festivals in India and abroad, it was the opening film at the Goa International Film Festival in November 2010 and at the 58th National Film Awards, the documentary went on to win the Indian National Award for Best Arts/Cultural Film. The film was produced by Cartwheel Features, a now-defunct subsidiary of an advertising agency called Cartwheel. The film chronicles the members of the band Indian Ocean since their formation in 1990 till the end of 2006, and showcases their music.

The film received good reviews in the Indian media. It was also the first documentary ever in India to be reviewed so heavily.

A 286-minute version of the film (entitled The Longer Trip) was released on DVD in December 2010, which included an updating of the band's story, including the death of Asheem Chakravarty in 2009. It also included several new chapters and facets that could not be covered in the theatrical version.
