= Baavra Mann =

- Directed by: Jaideep Varma
- Produced by: VS Kundu
- Cinematography: Paramvir Singh; Pankaj Rishi Kumar
- Edited by: Dintu George; Dhruv Sehgal
- Music by: Various
- Production company: Films Division
- Release date: 2013
- Running time: 127 minutes
- Country: India
- Language: English

Baavra Mann is a documentary film on the Indian filmmaker Sudhir Mishra directed by Jaideep Varma. Though ostensibly a biographical film, it is equally a portrait of the decline of the Indian creative and intellectual scene as touched by Sudhir Mishra's life, especially with regard to Sagar University, the theatre scene in Delhi and the film culture of Mumbai.

The film was started and completed as a part-time project from 2010 to 2013. The film's production house was called Saturday Films because the majority of the work used to happen on Saturdays.

In 2013 the film was taken over by Films Division, India, who is the official producer.

The film was completed in 2013 and travelled to festivals in New York Indian Film Festival and DC South Asian Festival – it won the "Best Documentary" award at the latter.
