= Perizaad Zorabian =

Indian actress

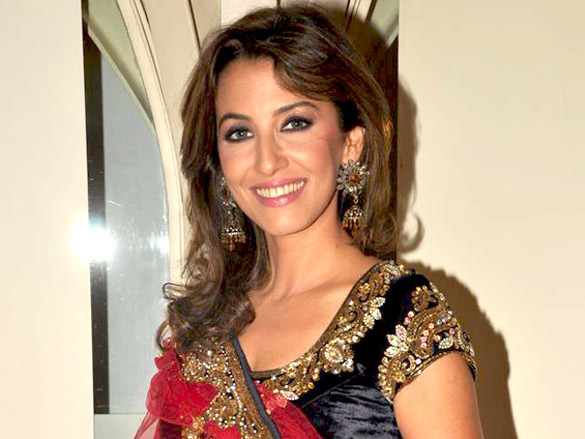
- Born: Perizaad Zorabian; 23 October 1973 (age 52); India
- Years active: 1997–2019
- Spouse: Boman Rustom Irani (m. 2006)
- Children: 2

Perizaad Zorabian is an Indian actress. Her film debut was with Nagesh Kukunoor's Bollywood Calling and she gained international recognition for her role as Jenny in Subhash Ghai's Joggers' Park (2003).

== Early life ==
Zorabian was born to an Irani Zoroastrian family in Maharashtra, India. She obtained a Master's in Business Administration at Baruch College and also attended the Lee Strasberg Theatre and Film Institute. She returned to India, and subsequently assisted her father in his poultry farm business, Zorabian Chicken.

== Personal life ==
She married construction tycoon Boman Rustom Irani in 2006 and has 2 children. She owns a restaurant "Gondola" in Mumbai. She has become the brand ambassador of the first Indian luxury fan brand Fanzart. She was the emcee of the grand opening event of HIL's third edition. She was part of the 2013 TOIFA panel discussion, that discussed the issues that women face across the globe.

== Career ==
Zorabian's first screen appearance was in a Clearasil television advertisement, which she had made before she moved to New York. She continued with advertisements for healthcare products after her return to Mumbai, and, in 1997, acted in a music video for Lucky Ali's Nahi Rakhta Dil Mein Kuch. She subsequently played "Maya" in the TV serial Hum Pardesi Ho Gaye.

Zorabian did a minor role in Mumbai Matinee (2003). In 2004, she played a supporting role in Morning Raga and made a cameo appearance in Dhoom. In 2005 she appeared in Ek Ajnabee opposite Kelly Dorjee, and a year later with Malcolm McDowell in Exitz. Her more recent films include Highway 203 (2006), Moonlight (2006), Just Married (2007), and Kabhi Up Kabhi Down. She has also acted in a Chinese film, Bandung Sonata, in which she played Indira Gandhi. From Bollywood, she moved on to becoming an entrepreneur handling her family poultry business by the name "Zorabian Chicken" since 2008.

== Filmography ==
Year	Film	Role	Notes
2001	Bollywood Calling	Kajal	
2002	Namaste : Say Hello to... Love	Ria	
2002	Bandung Sonata	Indira Gandhi	Chinese film
2003	Mumbai Matinee	Sonali Verma	
2003	Joggers Park	Jenny Suratwala	
2004	Satya Bol		
2004	Dhoom		Special appearance
2004	Morning Raga	Pinky	
2005	Devaki	Nandini	
2005	Ek Ajnabee	Nikasha R. Rathore	
2006	Moonlight		
2007	Salaam-e-Ishq		
2007	Highway 203	Madhu Kalpade	
2007	Just Married	Anu	
2007	Exitz	Ravina	
2009	Y.M.I. - Yeh Mera India	Jennifer Ali	
2015	Kabhi Up Kabhi Down		

=== Television shows ===
Year	Show Name	Role	Ref
1998	Captain Vyom	Shakti	
2001	Hum Pardesi Ho Gaye	Maya	
2002	Ssshhhh...Koi Hai	Aparna	

=== Webseries ===
Year	Web Series Name	Role	Ref
2018	Supermoms With Manasi (Episode 1)	Guest on chat show	
