= Sanjay Rajoura =

Indian comedian

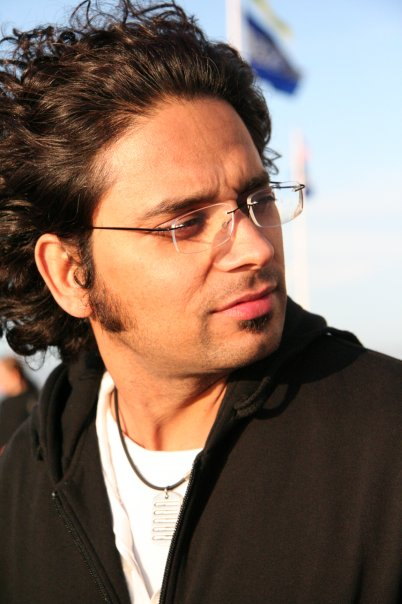
- Rajoura in 2009
- Born: September 18, 1972; Bulandshahr, Uttar Pradesh
- Occupation: Stand-up comedian
- Years active: 2009 - present

Sanjay Rajoura (born 18 September 1972) is an Indian stand-up comedian. He is a part of the comedy group Aisi Taisi Democracy.

== Early life and education ==
Sanjay Rajoura was born in a small town in Bulandshahar, Uttar Pradesh. He obtained his bachelor's degree from the University of Delhi and then pursued his master's degree at the Birla Institute of Technology.

Rajoura worked in Singapore and the United States in the software industry for more than 10 years before beginning his comedy career.

== Career ==
His first attempt at stand-up comedy was at an open mic event at a café in Delhi in 2009. His first major solo show Jat In Mood was held at the India Habitat Centre in New Delhi the same year. He has since performed over 500 stand-up shows in both India and Pakistan.

Rajoura has described himself as being "as liberal as it gets" and has said that "all comedy must be political". He also frequently uses unscripted material and draws on personal anecdotes and experiences.

In 2008, Rajoura acted in The Fiction, a short film directed by Spandan Banerjee. In 2015, he also appeared in I Am Offended, a documentary about stand-up comedy in India.
