= Hulla =

- Directed by: Jaideep Varma
- Story by: Jaideep Varma
- Produced by: Sunil Doshi
- Starring: Rajat Kapoor; Sushant Singh; Kartika Rane; Vrajesh Hirjee
- Cinematography: Paramvir Singh
- Music by: Indian Ocean
- Production company: Handmade Films
- Distributed by: BIG Pictures
- Release date: 19 September 2008
- Country: India
- Language: Hindi

Hulla is a 2008 Indian Hindi-language film directed by Jaideep Varma, and starring Sushant Singh, Rajat Kapoor, Kartika Rane, Vrajesh Hirjee, Darshan Jariwala and Ravi Jhankal. The film was produced by Suniel Doshi, under Reliance Big Pictures and HandMade Films.

== Plot ==
Raj (Sushant Singh), an aggressive stock-broker in a prosperous broking firm and Abha (Kartika Rane), a marketing professional are a couple in their early-thirties. They move into a new 2-bedroom flat in a Mumbai suburb expecting peace and quiet. Life is sweet as their promising careers now seem to be nicely complemented by domestic stability.

Cracks start appearing in their ideal existence when Raj who is light sleeper is disturbed by noises at nights. The noises wake him several times in the nights. Abha gave headphones to Raj and mouthing random things. But the idea failed when the doorbell rang. Finally one night, Raj goes down to investigate and discovers that it is the night watchman blowing the whistle periodically in the night to scare thieves away. Raj scolds the watchman and forbids him from making any further noise but the secretary, Janardan (Rajat Kapoor) insists on the whistling continuing for building security. Raj goes to the police station and filed a complaint. But the secretary sweet talks to the police officers and they told Raj that it was necessary to make those noises for security. The secretary decided that the whistling will begin 11:00 pm to 11:30 pm, 12:00 am to 12:30 am, 01:00 am to 01:30 am, etc.

An issue that starts out lightly and amusingly trivial begins to escalate to take the shape of a serious problem for Raj. He begins to slowly go to pieces. Not being able to sleep at night begins to take a serious toll on him, both professionally and personally. At work, he becomes edgy and his usual smart sense of judgment suffers. At home, he becomes obsessed with any loud noises in the environment. His disgust at being unable to solve a seemingly simple problem such as this begins to drive him crazy. Moreover, to his great irritation, no-one really sympathizes with his problem - not Abha, not Dev (Vrajesh Hirjee) - his friend at work, not any of the neighbours. It annoys Raj immensely, because he genuinely believes that this nightly noise-making is an illogical, uncivilized act. He did a drastic act. At the end, Raj due to lack of sleep by mistake sells a share in bulk in which the secretary had invested and both incur heavy losses. It was shown that Raj was supposed to move to a new apartment with Abha but Abha was sad that she left the old apartment and she went to her dad's house. On their way to their destined place, the watchman is no longer a watchman and is now a beggar. But the secretary, who was living a hard life makes his life even worse.

"Hulla" is story of a simple annoyance that destroyed few lives but fixed one life.

== Cast ==
- Sushant Singh as Raj Puri; a high-tempered sub-broker
- Rajat Kapoor as Janardhan; the secretary of a Mumbai suburb in which Raj lives
- Vrajesh Hirjee as Dev; one of Raj's closest friends and also his colleague
- Kartika Rane as Abha; a marketing professional, Raj's wife
- Darshan Jariwala as Abha's father
- Ravi Jhankal as the Chief Minister
- Jeetu shivhare as victim in police station
- Naseer Abdullah as Gupta

== Critical reception ==
Hulla was featured in Avijit Ghosh's book, 40 Retakes: Bollywood Classics You May Have Missed.
