= Jhini =

Studio album by Indian Ocean
- Released: 2003
- Genre: Fusion, Rock,
- Label: Kosmic

Indian Ocean chronology
Kandisa (2000)	Jhini (2003)	Black Friday (2005)

Jhini is the third studio album by the Indian Fusion band Indian Ocean recorded at Kosmic Studios in Varadeipalyam, Andhra Pradesh, in the midst of fields and hills, a hundred kilometres north of Chennai. The first performance of the Jhini track happened at the IIM Lucknow campus. The album was released in 2003, and the band first video was filmed, and they were MTV Artists of the Month. Sanjeev Sharma, who wrote Bhor, Nam myo ho, Des mera and After the war, and also directed the video.

Jhini was composed for the film Swaraj - The Little Republic and released as a separate album. Susmit Sen played an electric guitar for the first time on the track 'Torrent'.

== Track listing ==
All tracks are written by Indian Ocean (band).

No.	Title	Length
1.	"Jhini"	08:33
2.	"Nam Myo Ho"	09:20
3.	"Let Me Speak"	09:24
4.	"Des Mera"	04:59
5.	"After The War"	09:41
6.	"Torrent"	06:46
7.	"Bhor"	12:17
Total length:		01:01:29
