= Indian Ocean (album) =

Studio album by Indian Ocean
- Released: February 1993
- Genre: Fusion, Rock, Jazz
- Label: His Master's Voice

Indian Ocean chronology
Indian Ocean (1993)	Desert Rain (1997)

Indian Ocean also known as (A Musical Voyage With No Frontiers) is the debut album from Indian Ocean. The band's first album, recorded in just 10 days at His Master's Voice's Dumdum studio, Kolkata, in December 1992. Shaleen Sharma played the drums on this album. This is the only album in which Shaleen Sharma was present; in 2004 when he left the band he was replaced by Amit Kilam Released on cassette initially and later on CD selling over 40,000 copies an incredible amount for the time. This was a purely instrumental album with only a line or two sung by Asheem. It was a fluid album and defined the true sound of Indian Ocean before they became more of a pop band. Recording engineer for this album was Raja Mukherjee. Cover concept was done by Manas Chakrabarti. The graphic design work was done by Navin Shiromani. The Durgapal family gave Indian Ocean all their time, patience and space while Indian Ocean prepared for this recording.

== Track listing ==
No.	Title	Length
1.	"Village Damsel"	5:17
2.	"Out of the Blues"	4:55
3.	"Melancholic Ecstasy"	8:28
4.	"Going To ITO"	4:14
5.	"Torrent"	9:25
6.	"No Comebacks"	6:54
7.	"Brisk Lonely Walk"	5:49
