= The Biscuit Burners =

American bluegrass and Americana band

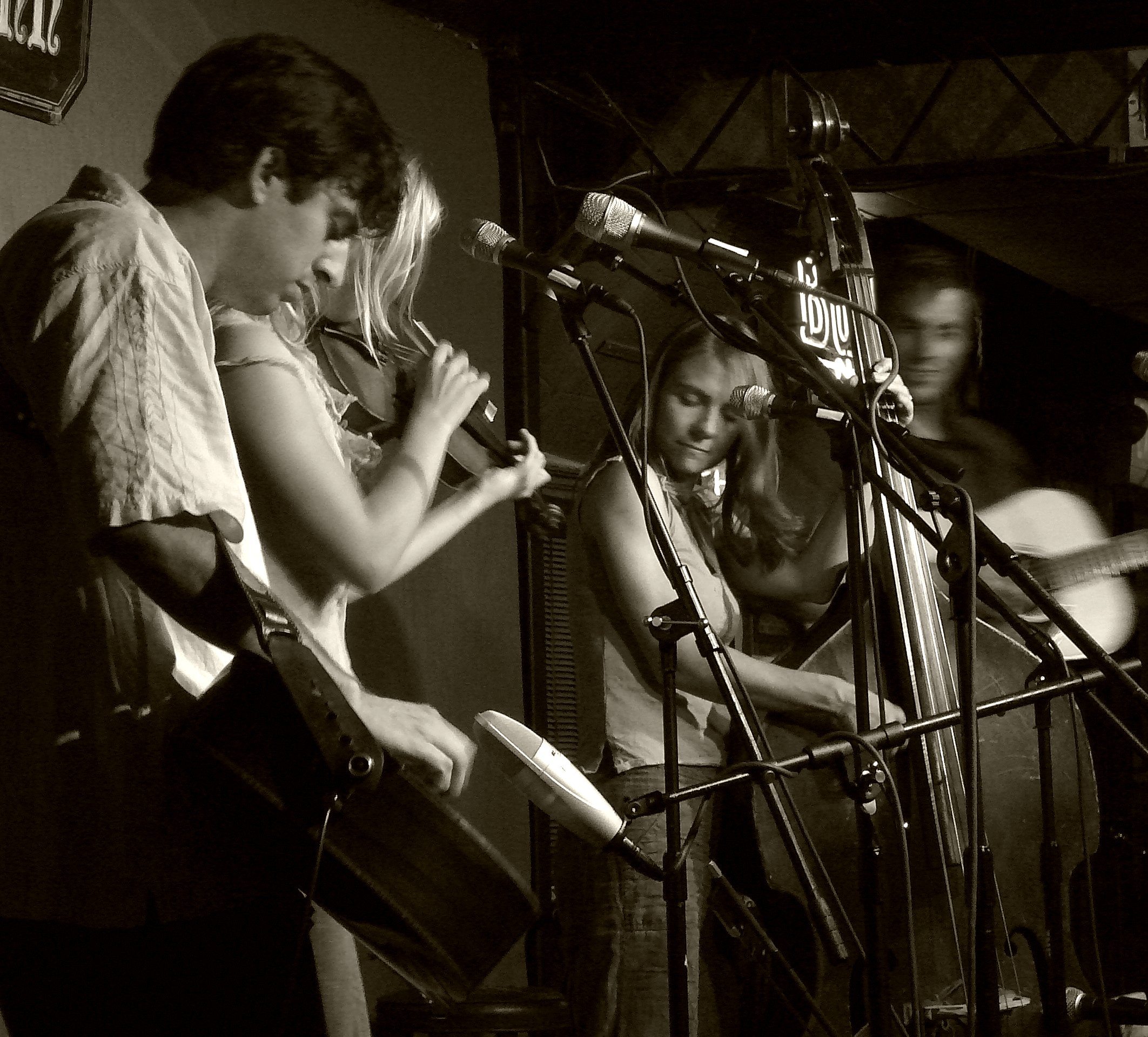
- The Biscuit Burners at the Station Inn, Nashville, Tennessee, May 28, 2008

Background information
- Origin: Alexandria, Virginia, U.S. Fredericksburg, Virginia, U.S. Charlottesville, Virginia, U.S. Weaverville, North Carolina, U.S.
- Genres: Folk; Country; Americana; Bluegrass; Old-time
- Years active: 2002–present
- Label: Indidog Records
- Members: Mary Lucey (founding member); Billy Cardine; Dan Bletz; Odessa Jorgensen; Shannon Whitworth (founding member); John Stickley (in studio); Wes Corbett (in studio)

The Biscuit Burners are a bluegrass and Americana band from Weaverville, North Carolina (United States); they are on hiatus as of 2009.

== History ==
The Biscuit Burners began in Asheville, North Carolina. Early founding member Lizzie Hamilton had previously worked with Steep Canyon Rangers. Beginning as an all-female group, the band quickly morphed into the core four of Mary Lucey (bass and vocals), Shannon Whitworth (guitar, clawhammer and vocals), Billy Cardine (dobro and banjo) and Dan Bletz (acoustic guitar).

Along with being showcased at the IBMA Conference and appearing at the Historic Ryman Auditorium with Vassar Clements and Rhonda Vincent, they had their debut album, Fiery Mountain Music, chosen in the Top 10 Bluegrass Albums of 2004 by the Chicago Tribune. Critics also chose Shannon Whitworth's song Come on Darlin' as the IPOD Hotpick Bluegrass Song of 2004. In September 2005, the band released their second album, A Mountain Apart, which was in the Top 20 of the Roots Music Report National Bluegrass Airplay chart for five months after its release.

In 2007, Odessa Jorgensen joined the band on fiddle and vocals and contributed to the band's third album. In 2009, Shannon Whitworth left the group to pursue a solo career.

The band's last show was in fall 2009 at the Kennedy Center as part of their Tribute to American Acoustic Music.

== Performance ==
The Biscuit Burners have appeared on BBC World's "Destination Music", National Public Radio's "Mountain Stage", XM's "Bluegrass Junction", and PBS' "Roadtrip Nation". The group performed at Bonnaroo in 2007.

Billy Cardine has performed with the three-time Grammy Winning Edgar Meyer at Carnegie Hall. The group has had a number of sellout concerts in Pennsylvania and California, and top bill appearances at major festivals. Musical style

== Instruction ==
In early 2004, The Biscuit Burners began an Appalachian Roots Music Schools Program, where they present the heritage of mountain music along with its techniques and etiquette. The program is designed to give school children a sense of the history and tradition of American bluegrass music.

== Recordings ==
- Fiery Mountain Music (2004) Indidog Records
- A Mountain Apart (2005) Indidog Records
- Take Me Home (2008) Indidog Records
