= Desert Rain =

Live album by Indian Ocean
- Released: 1997
- Genre: Fusion, Rock, Jazz
- Label: Kosmic

Indian Ocean chronology
Indian Ocean (1993)	Desert Rain (1997)	Kandisa (2000)

Desert Rain is the second album of Indian Ocean and the first live album ever to be released by any Indian band recorded by Vikram Mishra. It was recorded completely by accident from a concert played at the annual SAHMAT show at Mandi House, New Delhi on 1 January 1997. After waiting 7 hours to get on stage, Indian Ocean played an inspired concert that was well received by the crowd. Quite fortuitously, the band noticed a DAT recorder, bought a tape and recorded the concert. No major record label was willing to take the risk of releasing a live album, and so a record company label called 'Independent Music' was formed to release the album. Naresh Bhatia was the person instrumental behind the release of Desert Rain.

The album was released as a limited-edition copy in 1997 for circulation around Delhi. it was re-released in 2002 given the increasingly massive popularity of the band.

== Track listing ==
1. "Desert Rain"
2. "Village Damsel"
3. "Boll Weevil"
4. "Going To ITO"
5. "Euphoria"
6. "From The Ruins"
7. "Melancholic Ecstasy"

== Reception ==
Released on cassettes and CDs, Desert Rain was a landmark album for its time and today. It was recorded and mixed live by sound engineer Vikram Mishra on a DAT tape. The quality was so impressive that almost a decade later, it still continues to sell. In 2006, it was no. 2 on the iTunes UK World Music Charts.

Bhaskar Gupta of Allmusic.com gave the album a favourable review and considers it a vital link to the development of the band's music and their early inspirations.
