= 16/330 Khajoor Road =

Studio album by Indian Ocean
- Released: July 25, 2010-February 25, 2011 (Free Downloads); August 30, 2012 (Release)
- Genre: Fusion
- Label: Free Download

Indian Ocean chronology
Black Friday (2005)	16/330 Khajoor Road (2010)	Tandanu (2014)

16/330 Khajoor Road is the sixth album by the Indian band Indian Ocean, and is the first album after the death of founding member Asheem Chakravarty. The album includes two new members of the band, Himanshu Joshi for vocals and Tuheen Chakravarty for Tabla and other percussion. Lyrics are penned by Sanjeev Sharma.

The album is named after a 100-year-old bungalow where Indian Ocean had been rehearsing and creating their music since May 1997. This bungalow is located in the Karol Bagh area of Delhi. The band was offered this house by friends, Gurpreet Sidhu and Orijit Sen, who were living there at that time.

== Track listing ==
=== Free Downloads ===
Note: Released separately from July 25, 2010-February 25, 2011

1. "Chand"
2. "Shunya"
3. "Jogiya"
4. "Bondhu"
5. "Bula Rahaa"
6. "Sone Ki Nagari"
7. "Darte Ho"

=== Full Album (Published as 2 Disc Album) ===
Track 1–7 on Disc-01, Track 8–14 on Disc-02

No.	Title	Length
1.	"Chand"	5:44
2.	"Shoonya"	10:33
3.	"Bondhu"	9:35
4.	"Bula Raha"	8:42
5.	"Sone Ki Nagri"	8:28
6.	"Darte Ho"	7:06
7.	"Jogiya"	5:20
8.	"Hulla"	9:53
9.	"Untitled" (Studio Scratch)	8:36
10.	"Gum Hai Aisa" (Studio Scratch)	7:01
11.	"Phere" (Hulla Reject - Practice)	1:31
12.	"Leaving Home" (Live)	10:02
13.	"Tandanu" (Practice Room Jam)	7:34
14.	"No Comebacks" (Live At Khajoor Road)	4:56
