= Arko Mukhaerjee =

Indian singer

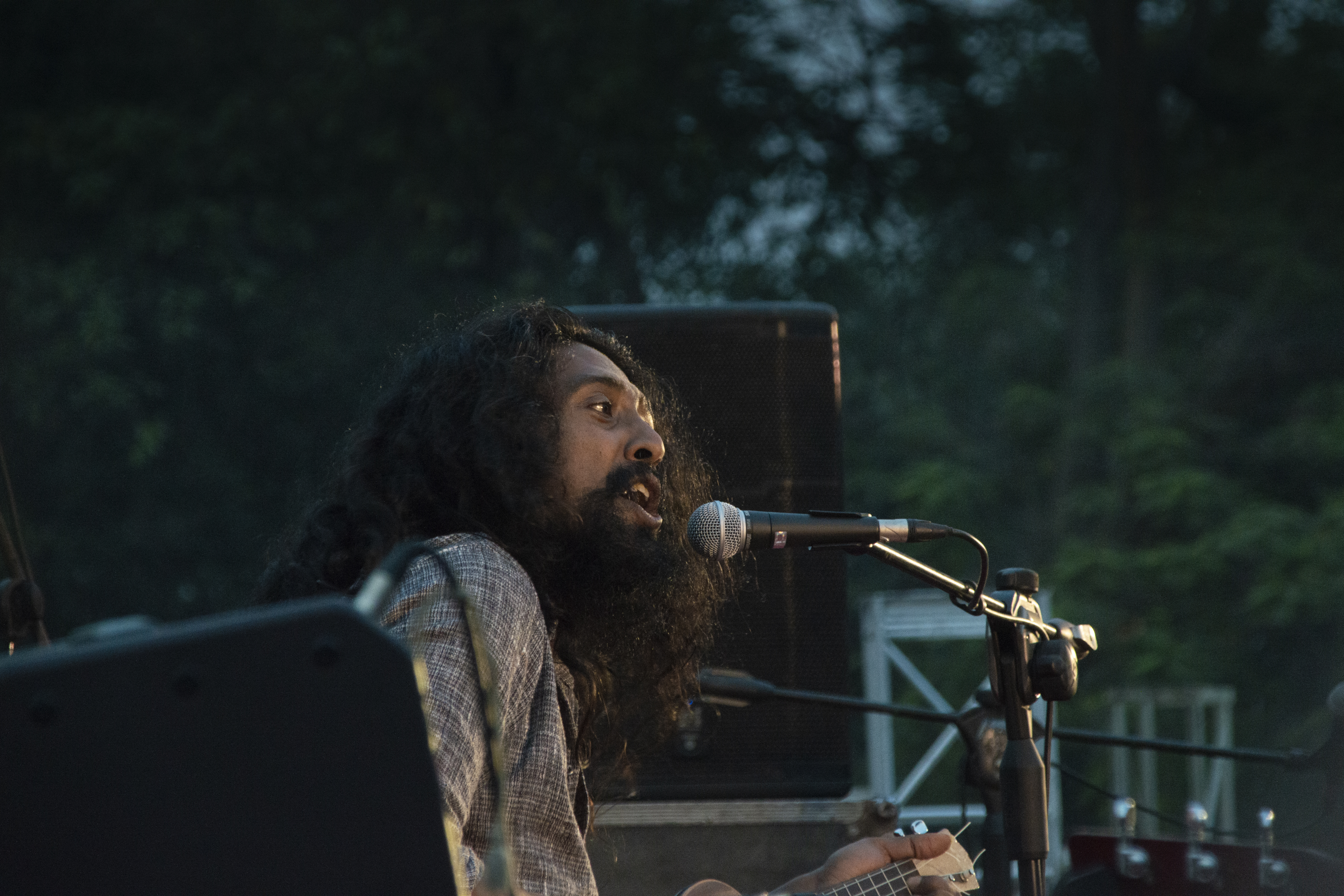
- Born: 5 June 1987; Behala, West Bengal, India
- Musical career
- Genres: Indian classical; Folk; Urban folk; Bengali modern music; Baul; Sufi; Independent; Bluegrass; English & Irish Folk; Pop
- Occupations: Singer; Musician; Folk artist; Music Researcher

Arko Mukhaerjee is an International musician, music researcher, Urban folk artist, playback singer from Calcutta, India. He sings folk songs in various languages including Bengali and Nepali. The singer can sing in more than 20 languages and plays five different instruments. He sings folk music to blues, soul and several tribal music forms from different parts of the world. He researches on the roots of folk and contemporary music by travelling around different parts of the world as Europe, America, Bangladesh and Nepal.

== Early years ==
Arko Mukhaerjee was born on 5 June 1987 in West Bengal. He formally started practicing classical music from his parents from the age of two. Later, he gave up his formal training at the age of ten and learned music by jamming and practicing. He has played and collaborated with different folk and gypsy jazz musicians and traditional artists in France, England, Germany and Eastern Europe and has played in many music festivals around the world including India, Europe, America, Bangladesh and Nepal.

In the year 2013, his first solo, Bengali folk album called 'Ghater Kotha' was released. In 2015, he released another album, called 'FIVE', an experimental folk album, based on collaborations with musicians from India and around the world. In 2018, his first original instrumental album called 'The Lion and the Hamster' was released. It is a text-image-music relations based album. In late 2019, Arko released 'Bondhur Bari' a purely field recording based album. He was the co-founder of the Indo-Irish musical duo project called 'Crossover' with Anna Tanvir, an Irish Harp player. The soundscape incorporated Celtic, Madagascan, American roots, gypsy jazz, Nepali, Indian, Spanish, Afro-Cuban, Senegalese and East-Bengali songs. In this project, they collaborated with Yann Beaujouan, Laurent Zeller, Alex Vousin, Kevin Goubern, Ritoban Das, Ginny Murray David, Project Caragoss, Ben Krakauer, Diptanshu Roy, and several other musicians from around the world.

Mukhaerjee was the frontman and co-founder of the folk band from Calcutta called 'Fiddler's Green' until 2019. The Bengali folk band had the elements of Bluegrass and Appalachian music brought in by co-founder/mandolin player Diptanshu Roy. The band also explored Celtic, Afro Cuban, Middle Eastern, Jewish and gypsy soundscape. He also had a duo with Naomi Jean an Australian percussionist. In 2015, he played together as duo with Satyaki Banerjee, a rabab, oud and dotara player and spiritual singer from Calcutta at several festivals. Arko is an active part of an ethno-electronic musical collaboration called Ashram, a brainchild of veteran Berlin based Indian music producer Kanishka Sarkar and the two of them have extensively toured in England, France and East-Europe alongside recording and playing together at the Indian embassy in Berlin. He was the vocalist and Ukulele player for Kolkata-based world music outfit called Ziba, conceptualized by Indian guitarist Amyt Dutta.

In 2018 and 2019, he collaborated with Daniel Givone, a Gypsy Jazz Guitar Maestro and Hari Maharjan, a Nepali jazz guitarist at the Nepal Gypsy Jazz festival. In 2019, he decided to leave all other bands and start his independent projects "The Arko Mukhaerjee Collective". Also, in 2020, he collaborated with Casey Driessen, a grammy nominee and an American Fiddle player. Arko also has a duo with experimental jazz guitarist Nishad Pandey. This duo often features Romeo Natur and Naomi Jean as co-musicians to form a fresh world music quartet.

== Recognition ==
Mukhaerjee has sung in various films, soaps and serials in Bengal. He has been nominated for different music awards in India for some of his songs. In 2014, a documentary called Bhorsha Thakuk Bangla Gaane was made in Bangladesh. The documentary depicts his stories of travelling with music where he is seen discussing the evolution and significance of Bengali folk music for the last four centuries. He was awarded a 'Gandharva Samman' ('Samman' meaning respect in Nepali) by the Gandharva community of Batulichor, Nepal for reviving the various songs of Jhalakman Gandharva. In 2019, he appeared in If Not for You, a documentary about Kolkata's long lasting love affair with legendary singer-songwriter Bob Dylan.
