= Kandisa (album) =

Studio album by Indian Ocean
- Released: March 2000
- Recorded: Western Outdoors Mumbai
- Genre: Fusion
- Label: Times Music

Indian Ocean chronology
Desert Rain (1997)	Kandisa (2000)	Jhini (2004)

Kandisa is the second studio album released by Indian fusion band Indian Ocean in March 2000. It went on to become one of the best-loved albums produced in India. Kandisa acquired cult status and propelled Indian Ocean into the status of one of India's most original and creative bands. The band left Indian shores for the first time ever in August 2001. They played their first concert abroad in London, and then went on to the Edinburgh Festival Fringe, where they played 18 concerts in 14 days, and were nominated the Pick of the Fringe. They returned to the Fringe in 2002 and 2003. In 2002, the band played 37 concerts abroad across four continents: New Zealand, USA, United Kingdom, Japan, Australia and Indonesia. In 2003 they toured the UK twice, as well as Australia, Germany, Singapore, and Réunion. In addition, they continued to play all over India.

In its 2014 listing of "25 Greatest Indian Rock Songs of the last 25 Years", "Rolling Stone India" featured two songs from the album, Ma Rewa and Kandisa.

== Production ==
The band went on the road – playing gigs in Gujarat, Rajasthan, Uttar Pradesh, West Bengal, Orissa, Madhya Pradesh, Karnataka, Haryana, Maharashtra. The break through into the mainstream came some time in late 1998 when Times Music (a division of Times of India) signed up the band. A few months later, Indian Ocean were invited to play at the Millennium celebrations at Khajuraho. K. R. Narayanan, then President of India, was one of the first, to hear the special composition, which is one of the high points of their album, Kandisa.

The album was recorded at Western Outdoors, one of India's premier studios, in Mumbai. Members of Indian Ocean call it as their first “proper” studio recording. They were given two weeks for recording and 5 days for the mix, and actually had a producer.

The band also pays gratitude to Gurpreet, Orijit and the Sidhus and the wonderful ambiance of 16/330 Khajoor Road, for the album's production.

== Track listing ==
Lyrics were penned by Sanjeev Sharma for Khajuraho, Kaun and Kya Maloom. Kandisa and Ma Rewa are traditional. Hille le is based on Gorakh Pande's words. Kashmiri lyrics in Kaun by Indira Kilam. Kandisa is an ancient prayer which is still chanted in the Syro Malabar Church and the Syriac Orthodox Church.

No.	Title	Writer(s)	Length
1.	"Kya Maloom"	Sanjeev Sharma
2.	"Ma Rewa"	Traditional
3.	"Leaving Home"	Sanjeev Sharma
4.	"Hille Re Jhakjor"	Sanjeev Sharma
5.	"Khajuraho"	Sanjeev Sharma
6.	"Kaun"	Sanjeev Sharma, Indira Kilam
7.	"Kandisa"	Traditional

== Languages ==
The album's title, and the song Kandisa is in Aramaic-East Syriac which is used in the liturgy of the Saint Thomas Christians of Kerala. Hindi is widely used throughout the album with Kashmiri lyrics in the song Kaun, written by drummer Amit Kilam's mother.
