= Rahul Ram =

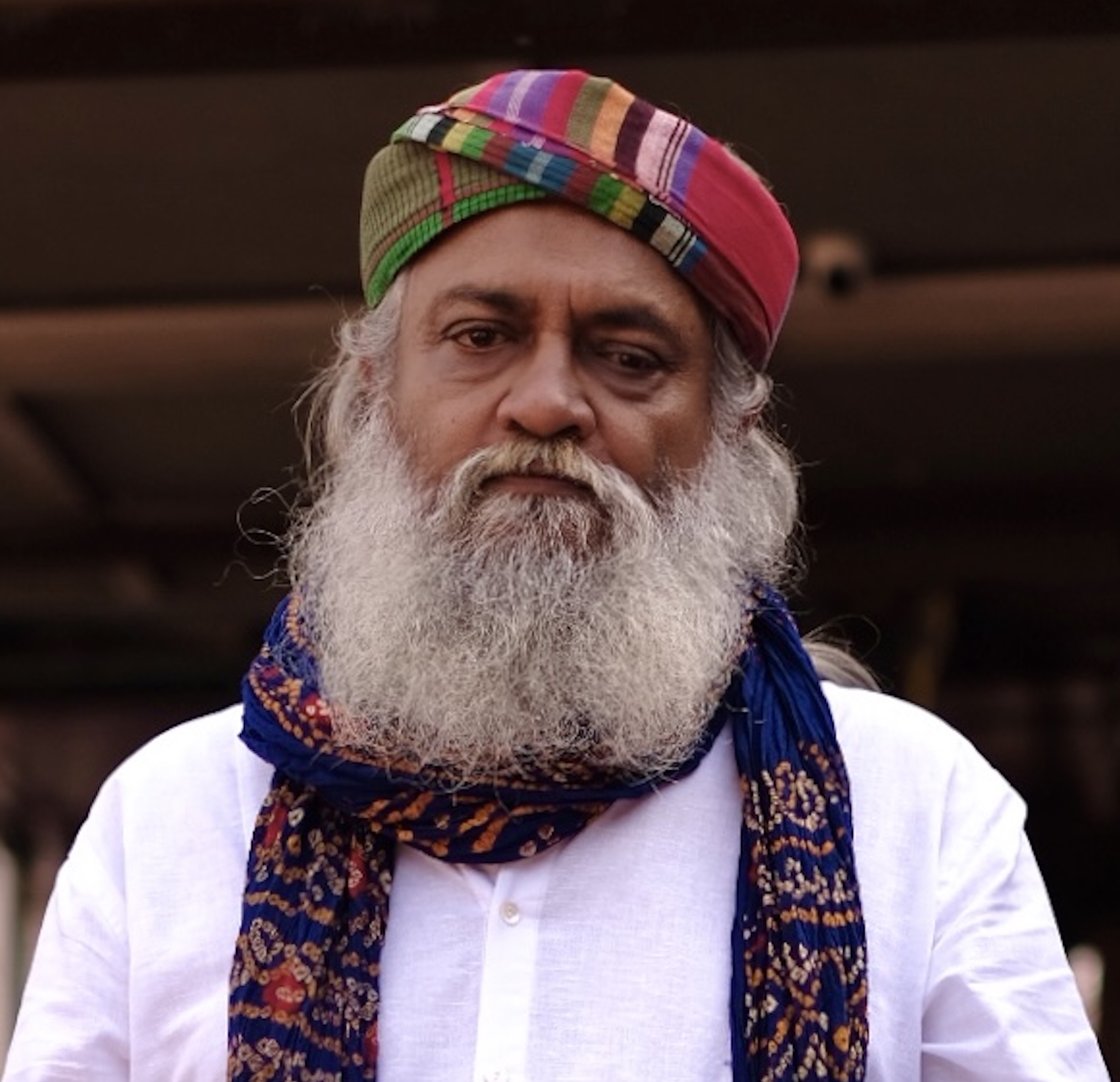

Background information
- Genres: Political satire
- Occupation: Musician
- Instrument: Bass Guitar
- Years active: 1991–present

Rahul Ram is an Indian bass guitarist, social activist and music composer. He plays bass guitar for musical band Indian Ocean, which he joined in 1991. He is also one of the three members of 'Aisi Taisi Democracy,' along with Varun Grover and Sanjay Rajoura.

== Biography ==
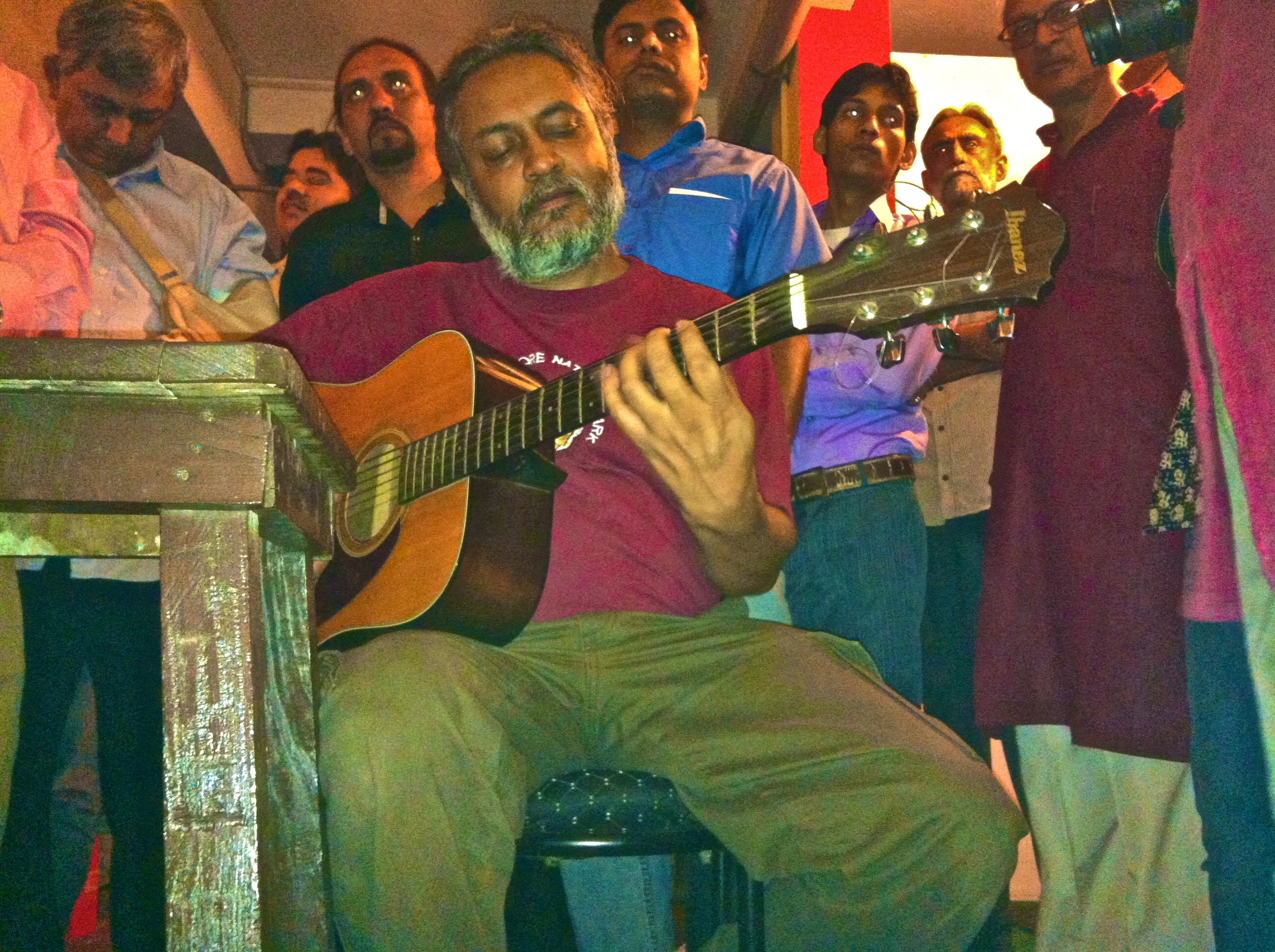
Ram performing in café May day near Jana Natya Manch, New Delhi

Rahul was born into a Kannadiga family, the son of noted botanist late Professor H.Y. Mohan Ram and late Dr Manasi Ram, a Bengali also a botanist and a founding faculty member of the Botany Department at Miranda House, University of Delhi. He is a nephew of the late H. Y. Sharada Prasad, who was best known as the media adviser to Indira Gandhi.

After schooling at St. Xavier's School, Delhi, he took a bachelor's degree in Chemistry at St. Stephen's College, Delhi and followed this up with an MSc degree in chemistry from IIT Kanpur. Next, he took a PhD degree (1986–90) in Environmental Toxicology from Cornell University, which he attended on an Andrew White scholarship. His doctoral research on environmental toxicology is what moved him to become an activist with the Narmada Bachao Andolan (1990–95). His stint with that activist group consumed five years of his life immediately after he took his doctorate from Cornell.

Concurrently with his Narmada activism, Rahul had joined the Indian Ocean band in 1991, soon after returning to India with his doctorate. Later, he went to America to learn to play the Alto saxophone, which he intends to bring to the band's music. Inside his group, he is known as Logic Baba because of his rationality. He has composed music and done playback singing in Bollywood. Rahul, along with Indian Ocean member Asheem Chakrabarty, sung the song 'Yaara Maula' in an Anurag Kashyap film Gulaal, a Hindi movie based on student politics. Rahul also created tribute videos for independent artists for ThankYouForMusic an event by Songdew.

== Discography ==
Rahul Ram's band Indian Ocean has also given music for the following films:

1. SWARAJ—The Little Republic (2002)
2. Black Friday (2004)
3. Hulla (2008)
4. Live in Concert (DVD) (2008)
5. Beware Dogs (2008)
6. Bhoomi (2009)
7. Yeh Mera India (2009)
8. Gulaal (2009)
9. Mumbai Cutting (2009)
10. Leaving Home – The Life and Music of Indian Ocean (2010)
11. Peepli Live (2010)
12. Satyagraha (2013)
13. Katiyabaaz (Powerless, 2014), a documentary film
14. Masaan (2015)
15. Gulabo Sitabo (2020)
16. Sarileru Neekevvaru (2020) (Hindi dub released in 2022)
17. Khufiya (2023)

In 2015, Indian Ocean composed the music for critically acclaimed Masaan (2015), in which Rahul Ram collaborated with writer Varun Grover and Swanand Kirkire for two songs and an original composition Bhor. Rahul toured with Being Indian original series 'Aisi Taisi Democracy,' the coming together of three prolific talents; stand-up comedian and social-satirist Sanjay Rajoura, stand-up comedian, writer and lyricist Varun Grover joined him.

Rahul also acted in A. R. Rahman's multi-lingual musical film 99 Songs.
