= Susmit Bose =

Indian musician

Susmit Bose (born November 1, 1950) is an Indian musician whose songs often deal with social issues, such as human rights, global peace and non violence. He has been making music since the 1970s and has performed widely in India and abroad. He participated in the International Folk Song Festival in Havana, Cuba in 1978. He has also been involved in making documentaries and films on socio cultural aspects of India. He composed music for the film "I am Kalam". After a hiatus of 25 years, he got back to the studio to record his critically acclaimed album "Public Issue" in 2006. In 2019, he appeared in If Not for You, a documentary about Kolkata's long lasting love affair with legendary singer-songwriter Bob Dylan.

Singing in English, he is considered by many as a source of social change for the generation of English educated Indians around the country and abroad.

'Song of the Eternal Universe', released in 2008, is an experimental album with the Bauls and is a follow-up to the hugely successful 'Public Issue' and "Be the Change" released in 2006 and 2007 respectively. Public Issue was his return to the studio after many years. In 2009 he released "Rock 4 Life", a rock album on HIV/AIDS with eight Rock bands from the eight States in North East India. He also released his album 'Essentially Susmit Bose' in 2009. "Song of Dharma", the story of the Mahabharata in song was released at the end of 2010. In 2020, a double album titled Then & Now was released to celebrate fifty years of his music, comprising a reissue of his debut album Train to Calcutta and a compilation of songs from his later albums.

== Major discography ==
- 2020 - Then & Now
- 2011 - Song of Dharma - the story of Mahabharata
- 2009 - Rock For Life
- 2009 -Essentially Susmit Bose
- 2008- Song of the Eternal Universe
- 2006- Be The Change
- 2005- Public Issue
- 1990- Man of Conscience
- 1978- Train to Calcutta
- 1973- Winter Baby
