= Jaideep Varma =

Indian writer/ film director

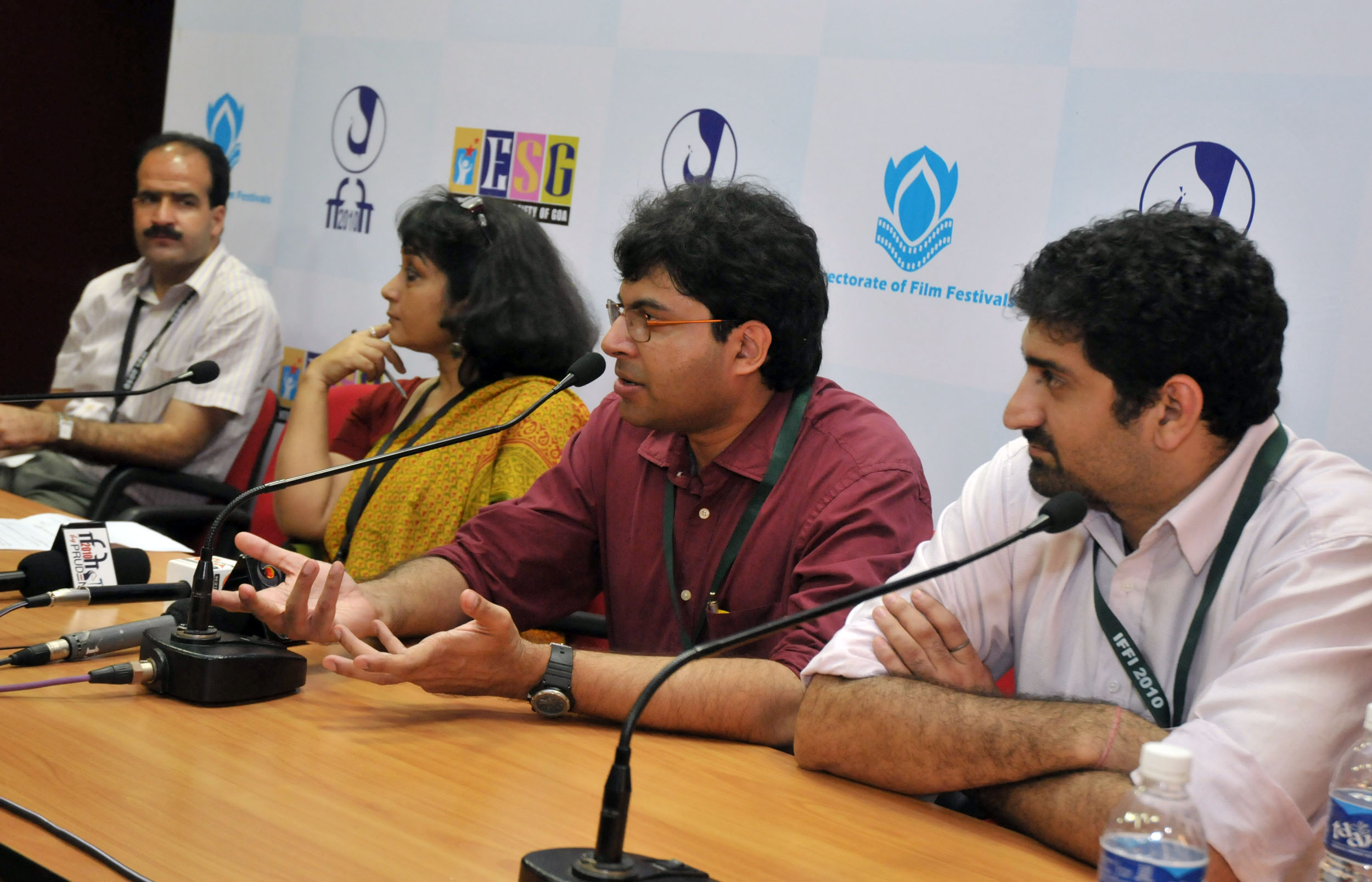
- Jaideep Varma (right), IFFI (2010)
- Occupations: Writer, screenwriter, filmmaker
- Awards: National Film Award (2011)

Jaideep Varma is an Indian writer, screenwriter and filmmaker. He has made 5 feature films – Hulla (2008, fiction), Leaving Home – the Life & Music of Indian Ocean (2010, non-fiction), Baavra Mann – a Film on Sudhir Mishra & Other Indian Realities (2013, non fiction), I Am Offended! (2015, non fiction) and Par Ek Din (2017, non fiction). The last three films were made part-time, and therefore on a limited scale.

In 2013, "Hulla" was included in a book on unsung Mumbai cinema classics over 50 years, a book called "40 Retakes" by Avijit Ghosh.

Leaving Home was the first documentary in the history of Indian cinema to release nationally in theatres. It also opened the Indian Panorama at the Goa International Film Festival in 2010 and won the National Film Award in 2011. At the 58th National Film Awards, the documentary went on to win the Award for Best Arts/Cultural Film.

"Baavra Mann" won the "Best Documentary" award at the Washington DC South Asian Film Festival, 2013.

His third full-length documentary film was on stand-up comedy in India and the larger context of contemporary Indian humour. The film is called "I Am Offended" and it released free on YouTube in February 2015 and has over 1.5 million views - the only Indian full-length feature online to have these many views.

Before that, he published a novel (Local) in 2005.

Between 1989 and 2000, he worked in advertising as a copywriter (in agencies like Mudra Communications, Ogilvy & Mather, Everest Saatchi & Saatchi, Nexus Equity and Cornerstone).

He also wrote for various publications primarily on music, most notably for the magazine Gentleman (magazine) between 1998 and 2001.

In March 2009, he accidentally created the Impact Index – an alternative statistical system in cricket. It has gone on to become the most written about alternative statistical system in the history of the game. From 2010 to 2017, he worked full-time on this. In early-2017, he also released a book Numbers Do Lie- 61 Hidden Cricket Facts on behalf of Impact Index (conceived by him) with cricketer and commentator Aakash Chopra (published by HarperCollins).

== Filmography ==
- Hulla (2008, fiction)
- Leaving Home – the Life & Music of Indian Ocean (2010, non-fiction)
- Baavra Mann – a Film on Sudhir Mishra & Other Indian Realities (2013, non-fiction).
- I Am Offended! (2015, non-fiction).
- Par Ek Din (2017, non-fiction).
