= Saturday Suspense =

Indian crime television series

- Country of origin: India
- Original language: Hindi
- No. of seasons: 1
- No. of episodes: 109

Production
- Running time: 52 minutes

Original release
- Network: Zee TV
- Release: 5 April 1997 – 1 May 1999

Saturday Suspense is an Indian television suspense thriller anthology series aired on Zee TV, which premiered on 5 April 1998. The series ended on 1 May 1999. Each episode of the series was 1 hour long, and produced by a different production company. Some of the noted producers and directors that have produced/directed Saturday Suspense stories are Shyam Ramsay, Manish Tiwari, Saket Bahl, Homi Wadia, Anant Mahadevan, Vivek Agnihotri, Mahesh Aney, Anurag Basu, Deepak Tijori, Ashutosh Gowariker, Raj Tilak, Vikram Bhatt & Ashok Shekhar.

== List of Episodes ==
No.	Name	Cast
1	My Last Birthday	Akshay Anand as Arvind Khanna, Kartika Rane as Shreya, Ashwini Kalsekar as Meethi Sen, Shakti Singh as Ranjeet Khanna
2	Khamoshi	Anup Soni, Rajendra Gupta
3	Tanhaai	Deepak Tijori, Yatin Karyekar, Iravati Harshe, Shishir Sharma
4		Grusha Kapoor, Benjamin Gilani, Yatin Karyekar, Avtar Gill
5		Natasha Sinha, Saurabh Shukla, Mahesh Thakur
6		Sheeba Agarwal, Ashwin Kaushal, Dipen C Vartak, Surendra Pal, Pankaj Dheer Director: Ramsay
7	Junoon	Abhimanyu Singh, Vicky Ahuja, Shweta Gautam
8		Ashutosh Rana, Kanwarjeet Paintal, Imran Khan, Sanjay Swaraj,
9	Ransom	Akshay Anand, Suresh Oberoi, Vani Tripathi, Jaya Bhattacharya
10	City Never Sleeps	Aamir Bashir, Mukul Nag, Krishamkant Sinha
11	Duplicate	Sadiya Siddiqui, Sangeeta Ghosh, Sanjeev Seth, Rana Jung Bahadur, Shiva Rindani, Rohitash Gaud, Moonmoon Banerjee
12	Woh Kaun Thi?	Kay Kay Menon, Ali Asgar, Shraddha Singh, Jahangir Khan, Mukesh Rawal, Rekha Rao Director: Anant Mahadevan
13	The Final Verdict	Rajit Kapoor, Yatin Karyekar, Abhimanyu Singh, Satyadev Dubey, Pinky Singh, Dolly Bindra, Yash Tonk, Sonali Malhotra, Ashutosh Gowariker
14		Benjamin Gilani, Shakti Singh, Rajesh Jais, Mona Ambegaonkar
15	Lalach	Amit Behl, Neelam Sagar, Aliraza Namdar
16	The Assassin	Kay Kay Menon, Reena Kapoor, Supriya Karnik, Atul Parchure, Amrit Patel, Jahangir Khan
17	Nau Se Barah	Rushali Arora, Firdaus Dadi, Nawab Shah, Ragesh Asthana, Harsh Khurana
18	On The Run	Kay Kay Menon, Sanjay Batra
19	The Picture	Pallavi Joshi, Rakesh Thareja, Afshan Khan, Vijay Aidasani, Madan Jain
20	Zakham	Deepak Tijori, Usha Bachani, Mamik Singh, Shruti Panwar
21	Khoj	Surendra Pal, Neelima Azeem, Sahil Chadha, Sandhya Mridul, Anant Mahadevan Director: Anant Mahadevan
22	48 Ghante	Deepak Parashar, Nishigandha Wad, Poonam Narula, Vaquar Shaikh, Shishir Sharma
23	Insaaf	Madan Jain, Reena Kapoor, Bakul Thakkar, Vaidehi Amrute, Brijgopal
24	Adhoora Abhinay	Suraj Thapar, Vani Tripathi, Ritika Matta, Humayun Director: Vijay Bhope
25		Irrfan Khan, Mausmi Makhija, Shilpa Tulaskar, Anupam Shyam, Prasad, Bimal
26	Double Cross	Irrfan Khan, Surbhi Zaveri Vyas, Kaliprasad Mukherjee, Ragesh Asthana Producer: Nikita Shah Director: Anurag Basu
27	Gumrah	Javed Khan, Neelam Sagar, Arun Bali, Tarakesh Chauhan, Lalit Tiwari Producers: Ramsays
28	Dark Memories	Ravi Kale, Rajeev Verma, Vaidehi, Vishal Singh
29	Wajood	Mohan Kapoor, Mita Vashisht, Rajendra Gupta, Anant Jog, Usha Bachani Producer: Achyut Vaze Director: Mahesh Aney
30	Kundali	Ashish Vidyarthi, Priyanka, Virendra Jha, Nandita Thakur, Seema Burman, Rajesh Pal, Mohankant, Ramakant Bhagat, Aashish Duggal, Devu Parekh, Jyoti Venkatesh Producer: Nikita Shah Director: Deepak Bawaskar
31	The Tenant	Gracy Singh, Anupam Bhattacharya, Salil Ankola, Muni Jha, Chang Chaang Ho Director: Vivek Agnihotri
32	Shinakht	Deepak Tijori, Shruti Panwar, Yatin Karyekar, Meenakshi Gupta, Anang Desai, Amin Haji Director: Vikram Bhatt
33	Nightmare	Mohan Bhandari, Kruttika Desai, Sandhya Mridul, Shashi Puri
34		
35		Harsha Mehra, Prithvi, Arun Govil, Dharmesh Vyas
36	To Catch A Killer	Akshay Anand, Suresh Oberoi, Usha Bachani
37	Music Killer	Nivedita Bhattacharya, Rakesh Thareja, Amit Behl, Neelanjana Sharma
38	Serial Killer	Suchitra Pillai, Joy Sengupta, Atul Kumar, Naveen Bawa, Sunil Jaitley
39	Khauff	Manasi Joshi Roy, Amit Behl, Mehul Buch, Abhay Bhargav, Gautam Joglekar
40	The Letter	Pawan Malhotra, Sangeeta Ghosh, Manish Choudhary
41	Chakravyuh	Eva Grover, Rio Kapadia, Atul Kumar, Bijay Anand
42	Breaking News	Kay Kay Menon, Achint Kaur, Suneel Sinha
43	Khamosh	Ali Asgar, Imran Khan, Sonia Kapoor, Sanjay Batra, Jiten Lalwani, Pankaj Kalra
44	Once More	Rajeshwari Sachdev, Shakti Singh, Rajesh Khera, Anupam Bhattacharya, Rakesh Thareja, Neelam Sagar, Kinshuk Vaidya Director: Vivek Agnihotri
45	The Only Witness	Pallavi Joshi, Shekhar Suman, Prithvi Zutshi
46	Kya Main Paagal Hoon ?	Aditya Srivastav as Inspector Suraj Madhavan, Rajit Kapoor as Inspector Navroz Piloo, Sheeba Chaddha as Dr. Rati Kothari, Kitu Gidwani as Dr. Rohini Sharma
47	Murder At Apollo	Pankaj Dheer, Amit Behl, Naresh Suri, Yatin Karyekar
48	Paheli	Aditya Srivastav as Varun, Irrfan Khan as Samar, Pratima Kazmi as Saira's Landlady, Jaya Seal
49		Nishigandha Wad, Yatin Karyekar, Sumukhi Pendse
50		Abhimanyu Singh, Amit Mistry, Aditya Lakhia, Gautam Joglekar, Divya Jagdale
51		Raju Kher, Vijay Aidasani, Aliraza Namdar, Girish Malik, Vaidehi Amrute, Reena Wadhwa
52	Rank 1st	Talluri Rameshwari, Neena Kulkarni, Benjamin Gilani, Joy Sengupta, Nasir Khan, Rana Jung Bahadur
53	Beqasoor	Parikshit Sahni, Tushar Dalvi, Achint Kaur, Deepraj Rana, Narendra Gupta, Susheel Parashar
54	Blackmail Trap	Rajesh Jais, Resham Tipnis, Sanjay Batra, Shakti Singh
55	Aakhri Inteqaam	Dalip Tahil, Brijgopal, Vani Tripathi
56	Dhoondti Nigahein	Vaquar Shaikh, Pankaj Kalra, Amrita Raichand
57	Kaun	Yatin Karyekar, Eva Grover, Hemant Choudhary, Dinesh Kaushik, Suhas Khandke
58	Gawaah	Suresh Oberoi, Akshay Anand
59	Kapat	Mrinal Kulkarni, Grusha Kapoor, Pankaj Berry, Ragesh Asthana
60	Virar To Churchgate	Ahmed Khan, Kishori Shahane, Vaquar Shaikh, Varsha Usgaonkar
61	The Switch	Anup Soni, Gautami Kapoor, Kaliprasad Mukherjee
62	Hadsa	Mohan Kapoor, Masumi, Rio Kapadia, Ajit Kelkar, Jaywant Wadkar, Shankar Sachdev
63	Silver Blaze	Reena Kapoor, Ashish Vidyarthi,
64	Forest Officer	Anup Soni, Sonia Kapoor, Rajendra Gupta, Pooja Madan, Ravi Gossain
65	The Dead Don't Steal	Rajat Kapoor, Natasha Sinha, Paritosh Sand, Sakshi Tanwar
66	Us mod par	Vijay Aidasani, Jharna Dave, Ashwin Kaushal, Vaishnavi Mahant, Ramesh Goel
67	Saboot	Kabir Sadanand, G. P. Singh, Ravi Jhankal, Prithvi Zutshi, Ankush Mohite
68	Friends	Deepshikha Nagpal, Kay Kay Menon
69	Saalgirah	Mita Vashisht, Boman Irani, Irrfan Khan
70		Nausheen Ali Sardar, Prithvi Zutshi, Manoj Joshi, Shreyas Talpade, Ankush Mohla
71		Shakti Singh, Rajesh Khera, Ravi Gossain, Naveen Bawa, Makarand Deshpande, Sunil Jaitley
72	ILZAAM	Vaishnavi Mahant, Ahmed Khan, Pankaj Kalra, Sanjay Batra, Harsh Khurana, Aashish Duggal
73	Nursery Crimes	Sabyasachi Chakraborty
74		Ashutosh Rana, Vineet Kumar, Mithilesh Chaturvedi, Anupam Shyam
75	A Simple Plan	Amar Talwar, Gufi Paintal, Kashmira Shah, Jahangir Khan
76	Lethal Tinsel	Anup Soni, Kuljeet Randhawa, Pavan Malhotra, Rajesh Tailang
77	Sanak	Anupam Bhattacharya as Sanjay, Vaidehi Amrute as Priyanka, Raviraj as Amrish, Vineet Kumar as Gandhi, Samata Sagar as Sheela, Shiv Subramaniam as Rafiq
78		Mahaveer Shah, Supriya Karnik, Amar Upadhyay, Shakti Singh, Rakesh Thareja, Amar Talwar, Firdaus Mevawala
79	Agar	Gautami Kapoor, Shilpa Tulaskar, Sandeep Mehta
80		Anup Soni, Ashutosh Rana
81	The Patient	Mohan Kapoor, Iravati Harshe, Rajesh Khera
82		Joy Sengupta, Kaliprasad Mukherjee, Kenneth Desai
83		Ashish Vidyarthi, G. P. Singh, Kaliprasad Mukherjee, Atul Kulkarni, Aashish Duggal
84		Rajesh Khera, Supriya Karnik, Munisha Khatwani, Ragesh Asthana
85	Raktarekha	Rajesh Shringarpure as Akash Singh, Aashish Kaul as Amit Saxena, Shruti Ulfat as Namita, Anang Desai as Watchman, Kartika Rane
86	Daav	Naresh Suri, Seema Kapoor, Sandeep Kulkarni, Harish Shetty, Surendra Pal
87	Keher	Sudesh Berry, Nikita Shah, Feroz Bhagat, Madhu Malhotra, Deepak Dave, Sharad Vyas, Rajul Diwan, Kumkum, Himmat Joshi
88		Shekhar Suman, Bhairavi Raichura, Aman Verma, Nasir Khan, Vishal Singh
89	Vishwaasghat	Sudha Chandran, Atul Kulkarni, Shweta Keswani, Arup Pal
90	Gehri Chaal	Sangeeta Ghosh, Ravi Gossain, Shabnam Mishra, Jaimini Pathak, Jaya Mathur, Ajay Rohilla
91		Deepak Jethi, Ashwin Kaushal
92	Jaal	Mrinal Kulkarni, Eva Grover, Vijay Aidasani
93	Murder By Net	Ashish Vidyarthi, Shireen Merchant, Bob Brahmbhatt, Ashok Banthia, Nitin Trivedi, Nandita Thakur, Tanya Banerjee, Jeetu Merchant, Jyoti Venkatesh
94	Blackmail	Sanjeev Seth, Bhupendra Awasthi, Anant Jog, Anil Yadav, Kaushal Kapoor
95	Haan Maine Coreena Peters Ka Khoon Kiya Hai	Nivedita Bhattacharya, Rohit Roy, Usha Bachani
96		Tom Alter, Neha Joshi, Kiran Juneja, Sachin Khedekar, Dilip Dhawan
97	Parcel	Pallavi Joshi, Mohan Kapoor, Gautam Joglekar
98		Rajendranath Zutshi, Shweta Kawatra, Shishir Sharma, Om Puri
99	Apradh	Seema Kapoor, Imran Khan, Lalit Parimoo, Benjamin Gilani
100	Confession	Alok Nath, Neha Joshi, Brahmachari
101	Will Power	Shweta Keswani, Kishori Shahane, Ashwin Kaushal, Sunil Shinde, Nishikant Kamat, Aamir Bashir, Jaywant Wadkar, Nasir Abdullah
102	Shart	Irrfan Khan, Shishir Sharma, Vani Tripathi
103	Officers	Amit Behl, Bhairavi Raichura
104	Beyond Truth	Kay Kay Menon, Ashwini Kalsekar, Achint Kaur
105	Hume Sab Pata Hai	Smita Bansal, Iravati Harshe, Anupam Bhattacharya, Jayati Bhatia, Girish Malik, Rajesh Khera
106	Telegram	Shishir Sharma
107	Dhund: Part 1	Anup Soni, Shekhar Suman, Usha Bachani, Pallavi Joshi, Deven Bhojani, Raju Kher, Suresh Chatwal
108	Dhund: Part 2	Anup Soni, Shekhar Suman, Usha Bachani, Pallavi Joshi, Deven Bhojani, Raju Kher, Suresh Chatwal
109	The Trap	Manoj Joshi, Divya Seth, Milind Gawali, Shakti Singh, Murli Sharma
