= X Zone =

Indian horror television series

- Country of origin: India
- Original language: Hindi
- No. of seasons: 1
- No. of episodes: 126

Production
- Running time: 45 minutes

Original release
- Network: Zee TV
- Release: 8 June 1998 – 30 October 2000

X Zone is an Indian television series aired on Zee TV from 8 June 1998 to 30 October 2000. It was the Indian version of X-Files. Directors like Anurag Basu, Tulsi Ramsay, Shyam Ramsay, Kushan Nandy, Vivek Agnihotri, Imtiaz Ali, Anil Sharma, Ketan Mehta directed some of the episodes of X Zone. It used to air every Monday at night.

== List of episodes ==
No.	Name	Cast	Producers	Directors
1	Gaddaar	Deepak Tijori, Nivedita Bhattacharya, Manoj Joshi	Ashwin Dhirai, Shashikant Shah	Ricky Sandhu
2-3	Grahan	Anju Mahendru, Param Vir, Vaishnavi Mahant, Vaidehi Amrute, Narendra Gupta, Sanjay Batra, Mulraj Rajda	Alka Shamsi	Shahab Shamsi
4-7	Neha	Mohan Kapoor, Nivedita Bhattacharya, Smita Bansal, Shakti Singh, Savita Bajaj, Rakesh Thareja, Noopur as Neha	Pallavi Joshi	Vivek Agnihotri
8-12	Sikander	Kumar Gaurav as Sikander, Mohan Kapoor as Rann Bahadur Thapa, Shruti Ulfat as Natasha, Rajesh Khera as The Mean Chief, Shakti Singh as Navin Bawa, Brij Bhushan Sawhney as Ravi Mishra, Asif Basra as Pammi Teddy, Candice Gracy as Master Gandhar	Pallavi Joshi	Vivek Agnihotri
13-14	Ansh	Rakhee Malhotra, Niki Aneja Walia, Naresh Suri, Achyut Potdar, Dinesh Kaushik, Mahesh Thakur, Neena Gupta, Shiva Rindani, Ragesh Asthana		
15-16	Sunanda	Harsha Mehra, Mehul Buch, Shashi Kumar, Paresh Panchmatia, Sujata Thakkar, Apurva Achharya, Kukul Tarmastar, Tulsi Rajda, Bharat Bhatt, Mahesh Vakil, Daivi, Devarshi, Homi Wadia	Nikita Shah	Homi Wadia
17	The Locked Room	Abhimanyu Singh, Sweta Keswani, Firdaus Dadi, Kajol Chakravorty, Abhay Mane	Kiran Shroff, Kushan Nandy	Kushan Nandy
18	Dark Memories	Rajeev Verma, Vishal Singh, Vaidehi Amrute, Minal Patel, Ravi Kale, Chaitrali Chirmule, Deepak Sharma, Dilip Darbar, Shahroz Khan	Rajeev Tandon	Swapna Waghmare Joshi
19-20	Raat aur Din	Raghubir Yadav, Pavan Malhotra, Shruti Ulfat, Ashish Duggal, Ragesh Asthana, Suhas Khandke, Pramod Moutho	Alka Shamsi	Shahab Shamsi
21-22	Dead Again	Iravati Harshe as Surabhi, Kay Kay Menon as Inspector Keval Mansingh, Sujata as Sister Christene, Ankush Mohla as Theodor Marx, Vicky Ahuja	Glen Barretto, Ankush Mohla	Glen Barretto, Ankush Mohla
23-24	Dahak	Arif Zakaria, Sukanya Kulkarni, Ravi Gossain, Vaibhavi Raut, Siraj Mustafa Khan, Manmeet Gulzar	Aneesh Dev	Rajesh Ransinghe
25	Ward No. 13	Suresh Oberoi, Anju Mahendru, Deepak Deulkar, Dinesh Kaushik, Pankaj Kalra, Yogesh	Alka Shamsi	Shahab Shamsi
26-27	Cheherey	Sachin Khedekar, Iravati Harshe, Kay Kay Menon, Manoj Joshi, Saurabh Dubey	Rajeev Mehta	Deepak Malwankar
28-31	Kashish	Navin Nischol, Meenal Patel, Rajasi Behere, Shivani Gosain, Shirin Merchant, Mohankant, Abha Parmar, Vandana Sajnani, Ritvika Dey, Ashwin Kaushal	Nikita Shah	Deepak Bawaskar
32-33	Mrityu	Bhavana Balsaver, Rituraj, Achint Kaur, Lilaver Tendulkar, Hemant Pandey, Jogi, Avinash Kharshikar, Hamid Khan, Master Akash, Master Samrat, Ashalasa Shinde, Sujata, Nirmala, P.D. Awasare, Rajinder Mehra, Karan Shah, Jaya Mathur	Karan Shah	Karan Shah
34-35	Anjaan	Aparna Tilak, Beena, Darshan Jariwala, Manish Nagpal	Ashish Jalan	Ketan Mehta
36-37	Vashikaran	Parmeet Sethi, Papia Sengupta, Reena Kapoor, Pramathesh Mehta, Suresh Gor, Khushboo	Nikita Shah	Homi Wadia
38-39	Ghungroo !	Salim Ghouse as Krishna Amma, Mukesh Jadhav as Tara, Bunty Sharma as Chameli, Ashok Sharma as Iqbal Hakim, Laxminarayan Tripathi as Champa	Rajeev Mehta	David Atkins
40-41	Kudrat	Vishal Singh, R. Madhavan, Seema Shetty	Aneesh Dev	Rajesh Ranshinge
42-43	Talaash	Anil Dhawan, Nishigandha Wad, Dinesh Kaushik, Jaya Bhattacharya, Smita Bansal, Rushali Arora, Jaya Mathur, Kanika Shivpuri, Mehul Buch	Alka Shamsi	Shahab Shamsi
44-45	The Caves Of Rangiri	Pallavi Joshi, Manish Choudhari, Dilip Pawle	Preeti Bubna Ali, Arif Ali	Imtiaz Ali
46-47	Woh Kaun Tha	Ashutosh Rana, Papia Sengupta	Vinta Nanda	Gaurav Saxena
48-49	Ateet	Bhavna Balsavar, Mohan Kapoor, Achint Kaur, Pratima Kazmi		
50	Baat Ek Raat Ki	Kay Kay, Mulraj Rajda, Ashok Lokhande,		
51	Bhram ?	Sukanya Mone, Sanjay Mone, Shyama Deshpande, Candida Fernandes, Yogesh Pagare	Two's Company	Glen Barretto, Ankush Mohla
52	Abhishaap	Nandita Puri, Bhaveen Gosain, Vinod Nagpal, Alefia Aftab Kapadia		Ray C
53-54	Asthiyaan	Shaukat Baig, Arpana Sharma, Ashok Sharma, Zafar Karachiwala, Dilip Thadekeshwar, Juhu Sinha, Gagan Gupta, Deepak Chand	Rajeev Mehta	Pavan S. Kaul
55-56	Karma	Anita Kulkarni, Lalit Tiwari, Ashok Laath, Abhay Chopra, Sagar Arya, Sanjeev Seth, Sanjay Gandhi, Chunnu Mehra, Zubeda	Vinta Nanda	Vinta Nanda, Anil Sharma
57-58	Dafan	Nitesh Pandey, Ravi Gossain, Yash Tonk, Sushma, Kartika Rane		
59	Woh Raat	Nawab Shah, Sangeeta Ghosh, Ritu Raj, Gajendra Chauhan, Kanika Shivpuri, Rajeeta Kochhar, Vilas Raaj, Poonam Das Gupta	Tulsi Ramsay, Shayam Ramsay	Deepak Ramsay
60	Gumrah	Divya Jagdale, Sudhanshu Pandey, Meenakshi Gupta, Rupesh Thapliyal, Jaspir Thandi	Two's Company	Glen Barretto, Ankush Mohla
61-62	Caretaker	Aly Khan, Shweta Keshwani, Malvika Singh		
63-64	Khwaab	Aparna Tilak, Varun Badola, Nakul S Vaid, Madhu Malti, Rachna Goel, Mukesh Ahuja, Mohit K Jha	Deepa Sahi	Ketan Mehta
65	Hairat	Priyanka as Meenakshi, Anup Soni as Aniket, Mansi Salvi as Kavita, Shakti Singh as Pande, Ashok Lokhande as Jatashankar, Jyotsna, Sarvendar Singh	Ricky Sinha, Harsha Sinha	Deepak Bawaskar
66-67	Whitelight	Nikki Aneja, Naveen Bawa, Tanaz Currim, Kay Kay, Kamal Jain, Master Kinshuk	Pallavi Joshi	Vivek Agnihotri
68-69	Shareer	Kanwarjit Paintal, Navni Parihar, Murali Sharma, Ritu raj		
70-71	Rakshak	Nasir Khan, Alifia Kapadia, Sagar Arya, Mukesh Jadhav	Two's Company	Glen Barretto, Ankush Mohla
72	Mangni	Beena, Arundhati Ganorkar, Pamela Mukherjee, Rajesh Sharma	Mallika Jalan	Rabiranjan Maitra
73-74	Zidd	Zarina Wahab, Gajraj Rao, Poonam Narula, Hussain Kuwajerwala, Jaya Bhattacharya, Amitanshu Jain	Preety Bubna Ali, Arif Ali	Imtiaz Ali
75-76	Fear	Shrivallabh Vyas, Anupam Shyam, Murli Sharma, Meenakshi Gupta		
77-78	Vishesh	Deepa Parab, Nupur Alankar, Bakul Thakkar, Joy Sengupta, Shakti Joshi, Ramesh Rai, Kali Prasad Mukherjee, Rekha Rao		
79-80	Coma	Joy Sengupta, Kamalika Guha Thakurta		
81	666	Vrajesh Hirjee, Murli Sharma, Uttara Baokar, Ashwini Kalsekar, Shivani Gosain, Shilpa Saklani, Manav Kaul		
82-83	Planchette	Poonam Narula, Aman Verma, Shital Thakkar, Vandana Sajnani, Prithvi Zutshi, Pratima Kazmi, Amla Rai, Rani Sharma	Deepak Bhalla	Anik Ghosh
84	Saath Phere	Raman Trikha, Yatin Karyekar, Arpita Pandey, Nausheen Ali Sardar, Sai Ballal		
85-86	Madhyam	Juhi Parmar, Sandhya Mridul, Sujata, Sagar Arya		
87-88	Drishti	Sameer Dharmadhikari, Anita Kulkarni, Arya Rawal, Vandana Marathe, Jaswinder Gardner		
89-90	Shraap	Kanchan, Deepraj Rana, Khyaati Khandke Keswani, Vandana Sajnani, Mehul Buch,		
91	Wild Rose	Ravee Gupta		
92	12 O'Clock			
93	Shamshaan	Ayub Khan, Vaishnavi Mahant, Manjeet Kullar, Arun Bali, Nandita Thakur		
94	Jwala	Bhairavi Raichura, Aamir Bashir, Suhita Thatte, Joy Sengupta		
95	A True Story	Ravi Khanvilkar, Parag Deshpande, Shreyas Talpade, Kishori Shahane		
96	Mukti	Suchitra Pillai, Gufi Paintal, Vrajesh Hirjee, Pratima Kazmi		
97	Ashaant	Shama Deshpande, Gufi Paintal, Lata Haya, Nayan Bhatt, Suresh Gaur, Rakesh Vyas, Shridhar Parab, Siddharth Ravrani	Nikita Shah	Homi Wadia
98	Bhavishya	Hussain Kuwajerwala, Chitrapama Bannerjee, Mouli Ganguly		
99	Sculptor	Atul Agnihotri, Ramesh Rai, Mandeep Bhandar, Bakul Thakkar, Gayatri Jariwala		
100	Milan	Murli Sharma, Achint Kaur, Sucheta Khanna, Abhay Mane,		
101	13 Days	Meenakshi Gupta, Anup Soni, Vishnu Singh	Raj Sharma	Raj Sharma
102	Raniya	Chitrapama Bannerjee, Shishir Sharma, Nandita Puri, Virendra Saxena,		
103	Woh 7 Din	Shonali Malhotra, Ragesh Asthana		
104	Ilaaka	Kashish Kaul		
105	The Return Of Woh	Aparna Tilak, Sweta Keswani, Lilliput		
106	Sauda	Kali Prasad Mukherjee.Kay Kay Menon, Mandeep Bhandar, Meenal Patel, Ashwini Kalsekar, Murli Sharma		
107	Aaina	Adi Irani, Neelima Azeem, Payal Nair, Anjali Mukhi		
108	Angela	Sudhanshu Pandey, Ravee Gupta, Mangala Kenkre		
109	Believe It Or Not	Harsh Chhaya, Shadaab Khan, Ravi Gossain, Jaya Bhattacharya, Kitu Gidwani, Anang Desai		
110	Gunah	Ajay Mankotia, Usha Bachani, Indira Krishnan, Shiva Rindani, Ritwika Dey, Pooja Ghai Rawal		
111	Author	Divya Jagdale, Deepan C. Vartak Ananya Khare, Iqbal Azad, Ami Trivedi,		
112	Janam	Sajni Hanspal, Dolly Sohi, Pramod Mouthu	Raj Sharma	Raj Sharma
113	Suhaag	Manoj Joshi, Vishwanath, Vaishali Thakkar, Vipra Rawal, Suhita Thatte		
114	Apshagun	Anupam Bhattacharya, Seema Shetty, Prithvi Zutshi, Anju Mahendru, Gayatri Jariwala, Murli Sharma		
115	Mad Man's Diary	Rajesh Khera, Mehul Buch, Sucheta Khanna, Pratima Kazmi,		
116	Kasara Ghaat	Ravi Kishan, Prachi Shah, Meenakshi Gupta, Sahiba Khan	Raj Sharma	Raj Sharma
117	Bees Saal Baad	S.Madan, Purbi Joshi, Sadhana Singh		
118	Nisachar	Ajinkya Deo, Murli Sharma		
119	Haqeeqat	Sucheta Khanna, Poornima, Meenakshi Verma, Gunn, Raj Zutshi		
120	Saheli	Shakti Anand as Rakesh Jindal, Kuljeet Randhawa as Karishma, Nilanjana Sharma as Pooja, Murli Sharma as Dr. Gomes		
121	Kirdar	Achint Kaur, Irrfan Khan	Inhouse Productions	
122	6½	Aditya Srivastava, Murli Sharma, Anirudh Agarwal, Kali Prasad Mukherjee, Lata Sabharwal, Gayatri Jariwala		
123	The Sweeper 🧹	Vrajesh Hirjee, Sameer Khakkar, Suhasini Mulay, Meenakshi Verma, Candida Fernandes		
124-125	Kabza	Salil Ankola, Durga Jasraj		
126	Mangalsutra	Raj Zutshi, Sonia Kapoor, Uday Tikekar		

== Production ==
For Woh Kaun Tha this was the first time in 10 years that a TV serial crew had gone deep into the so-called affected areas - Srinagar, Gulmarg and Pahalgam of Kashmir Valley.

Talaash was the story of Kusum who hallucinates about a girl killed in her college and had recurrent nightmares.

=== Casting ===
Tanaz Currim in Whitelight played the wife of a colonel who is possessed by an evil spirit.

Kumar Gaurav played the role of an amnesiac in story 'Sikandar, who pieces together his past to realize he is the world's most dreaded terrorist'. The story was based on Carlos.

Brijesh Hirjee played Dracula in an episode in 2001.
