= Mano Ya Na Mano (1995 TV series) =

Indian horror television series

- Created by: Balaji Telefilms
- Directed by: Rajesh Ranashinge
- Opening theme: "Mano Ya Na Mano"
- Country of origin: India
- Original language: Hindi
- No. of seasons: 2
- No. of episodes: 104

Production
- Producers: Shobha Kapoor; Ekta Kapoor
- Editor: Dharmesh Shah
- Running time: approx. 23 minutes
- Production company: Balaji Telefilms

Original release
- Network: Zee TV
- Release: 16 June 1995 – 1999

Mano Ya Na Mano (transl. Believe It Or Not) is a horror television drama series aired on Zee TV channel in 1995. The series was directed by Rajesh Ranashinge.

== Concept ==
The series features episodic horror/thriller stories based on supernatural beliefs. Each story is portrayed in a dramatic representation based on mystic and paranormal convictions. Besides, each story is shot in a different location and consists of a different star cast.

== Episodes ==
=== Season 1 ===
Episode No.	Title	Cast	Director
1–7	Reema	Shraddha Nigam, Vishal Puri, Reema, Homi Wadia, Prashant Bhatt, Vineet Kumar, Mangala Kenkre, Bhairavi Raichura, Paresh Panchmatia, Kukul Tarmaster, Apurv Acharya, Rohini Hattangadi, Ankita Nigam	Homi Wadia
8–11	Kabzaa	Durga Pandit, Shefali Shah, Ashwin Kaushal, Suhag Diwan, Hema Diwan, Faiyaz Sheikh, Monica Godbole, Kishore Bhati, Premraj, Sharad Sharma, Deepali, Yogeeta	Homi Wadia
12–19	Kaal Sarp	Manisha Usgaonkar, Manish Nagpal, Paresh Panchamatia, Bhai Ravi, Padmarani, Sharad Sharma	Rajesh Ranasinghe
20–23	Anhonee	Rajesh Agarwal, Anjali Rajput, Prashant Subhedar, Satish Pulekar, Shrikant Moghe, Shrikant Desai, Ashalata Wabgaonkar, Umesh C. Ray, Ashok Pahelwan, Veena Desai	Smita Talwalkar
24–27		Arup Pal, Mrinal Kulkarni, Mandeep Bhandar	
28-32		Mahaveer Shah, Bhushan Kumar	
33–34		Navni Parihar, Vijayendra Ghatge, Aamir Dalvi, Jayshree Godbole	
35–38		Zaheeda Parveen, Amit Behl, Vandana Sajnani, Salim Fatehi, Rajeeta Kochar, Ramesh Goel	
39–42	Anumaan	Shivaji Satam, Kiran Karmarkar, Aniruddh Agarwal, Sangeeta Handa	
43–46	Vash	Resham Tipnis, Aly Khan, Imtiaz Khan, Suneel Rege	
47–50		Poonam Narula, Aashish Kaul, Romanchak Arora	
51–55		Kartika Rane, Gautam Chaturvedi, Akhil Ghai, Santosh Shukla, Suraj Chaddha, Kaushal Kapoor, Meena Naik, Gaurav Chaudhary	
56–60		Sangeeta Ghosh, Sandhya Mridul, Prithvi Vazir, Pooja Madan, Manish Khanna, Susheel Parashar, Ali Khan	
61–64		Mehul Buch, Dharmesh Vyas, Bhushan Kumar, Renu Vaidya, Razak Khan	
65–68		Arun Bali, Mukesh Rawal, Suchitra Bandekar, Asha Sharma, Sumeet Pathak, Vishwajeet	

=== Season 2 ===
Episode No.	Title	Cast	Director
1–3		Harsh Chhaya, Sujata, Meenal Patel, Ashwin Kaushal, Dalip Tahil	
4–7	Parchhaai	Kishori Godbole, Eva Grover, Sudhanshu Pandey, Urmila Kothare, Tinnu Anand, Asha Sharma, Achala Sachdev, Ragini	Pawan S. Kaul
8–10		Raza Murad, Vaidehi Amrute, Kiran Karmarkar, Neha Pendse, Ashalata Wabgaonkar	
11–14		Deepshikha Nagpal, Hussain Kuwajerwala, Parikshit Sahni, Ritu Kambow, Chitra Kopikar, Sharukh Bharucha, Renu Vaidya, Meenal Patel	
15–17		Mohan Kapoor, Kavita Kapoor, Kanwarjeet Paintal, Ashwin Kaushal	
18–19		Harsh Khurana, Jatin Sial, Manorama, Richie Sharma	
20–22		Grusha Kapoor, Vishal Puri, Satyajeet	
23–25		Diwakar Pundir, Surekha Sikri, Vijay Raaz, Sonali Malhotra, Kiran Randhawa	
26–28		Rituraj Singh, Tinnu Anand, Monica Bedi, Rajesh Tandon, Munisha Khatwani, Anita Pawal	
29–30		Mandira Bedi, Milind Gawali, Arif Zakaria, Rinku Dhawan, Karan Lukha	
31–33		Sahil Chadha,Ashwini Kalsekar, Gazala Selmin, Mahru Sheikh, Kiran Randhawa	
34–35	Darr	Gautami Kapoor, Yash Tonk, Zafar Karachiwala, Dilip Thadeshwar, Nayan Bhatt	
36–38	Souten	Papiya Sengupta, Kishori Shahane, Harsh Chhaya, Seema Bhargav	
39–40		Sangeeta Ghosh, Vaquar Shaikh, Grusha Kapoor, Anupam Bhattacharya	–

== See also ==
- List of Hindi horror shows
