= Milind Gawali =

Indian actor and director

- Born: 16 June 1966 (age 60); Mumbai, Maharashtra, India
- Occupations: Actor, director
- Years active: 1984–present
- Spouse: Deepa Gawali (m. 1990)
- Children: 1

Milind Gawali (born 16 June 1966) is an Indian actor and director. He has acted in different Marathi, Hindi and Malayalam films and Television serials. He is known for playing Aniruddha Deshmukh in Star Pravah's TV Series Aai Kuthe Kay Karte!

As a child, he acted in two Children films, Hum Bachche Hindustan Ke and Govind Saraiya's Waqt Se Pehle. As an adult, he performed in the Hindi Film Vartaman directed by Pradeep Maini, followed by Hindi film Anumati, Directed by Baburam Ishara came his way. He was invited by Sanjeev Bhatacharya to Act in his ongoing Hindi Serial Campus a Television serial on Zee TV which became very popular and one after another serial came his way, like Parivartan directed by Vijay Panday, Aahat and C.I.D. directed By B. P. Singh, Balaji Telefilm's Bandhan, Itihas, Kahani Terrii Merrii, simultaneously he started Doing Marathi films like Nilambari, Aai, Maratha Battalion etc.

== Early life ==
He did his primary schooling from Fatima High School, Vidya Vihar, and secondary schooling from Shardashram High school, Dadar. His first-year College was Ambedkar College for Commerce, Second year in Kirti College, Prabhadevi, and three-year secondary till the final Year college was Lala Lajpat Rai College of Commerce at Worli, Haji Ali and Post Graduation i.e. M.Com. from The University of Mumbai.

== Selected filmography ==
=== Actor ===
No.	Film	Director
1	Shoor Aamhi Sardar	Ramesh More
2	Aamhi Ka Tisare	Ramesh More
3	Dholkichya Talavar	Kishor Vibhandik
4	Ashi Hoti Sant Sakhu	Subhash Sharma
5	Trikut	Jayanta Bordoloi
6	Eka Varchad Ek	Rajesh Patole
7	Hausene Kela Pati	Dawood Sheikh
8	Palkhi	Vinod Kumar
9	Aadhar	Shyam Dharmadhikari
10	Vaibhav Laxmi	Janardan Shinde
11	Chandrapurchi Mahakali	Pitambar Kale
12	Maitri Jeevachi	Krishna Kamble
13	Karuya Udyachi Baat	Kshitij Zarapkar
14	Durga Mhantyat Mala	Raju Parsekar
15	Aai Tujha Ashirwad	Madhura Jasraj
16	Maratha Battalion	Nagesh Dharak
17	Sakkha Bhau Pakka Vairi	Pitambar Kale
18	Aar Aar Aaba Aata Tari Thamba	Reema Amrapurkar
19	Vitthal Vitthal	Gajendra Ahire
20	Bhakti Hich Khari Shakti	Prajwal Shetty
21	Devaki	Milind Uke
22	He Khel Nashibache	V.K. Naik
23	Bhavachi Laxmi	Sandeep Navare
24	Sun Ladki Sasarchi	V.K. Naik
25	Aai	Mahesh Manjrekar
26	Sasar Majhe Mandir	Pitambar Kale
27	Most Wanted	Rajan Prabhu
28	Sasuchya Gharat	Pitambar Kale
29	Mast Kalandar	Ashok Karlekar
30	Chingi	Raj Israni
31	Kalbhairav	Satish Randive
32	Karlyachi Ekvira	Yakub Sayeed
33	Maherchi Maya	Satish Randive
34	Hirva Chuda	Arun Bhosale
35	Mahima Khandobacha	Manohar Sarvankar
36	Halad Tujhi Kunku Majhe	Sandeep Navare
37	He Aaple Asach Chalaycha	V.K. Naik
38	Sobati	Ashok Karlekar
39	Ghat Pratighat	Rajan Prabhu
40	Sarvodaya	Dawood Sheikh
41	Nilambari	Satish Randive
42	Sant Vaman Bhau	Raj Kuber
43	Andolan	Prashant Rane
44	Apaharan	Sadulla Khan & Krishna Kamble
45	Dhav Renuka Dhav	Jaysinghrao Mane
46	Savatiche Kunku	Anand Shishupal
47	Tejaswini	Satish Randive
48	Dhangar Wada	Sameer Athalye
49	Parakh Natyanchi	Mukeshbhai Mistry
50	He Milan Saubhagyache	Subhash Gaikwad
51	Gaav Majhe Tanta Mukt	Shravan
52	Swami Samarth	Lekha
53	Than Than Gopal	Kartik Shetty

=== Lead actor – Hindi and other films ===
No.	Film	Director
1	Waqt Se Pehle	Govind Saraiya
2	Vartaman	Pradeep Maini
3	Chanchal	Indrajeet Arora
4	Hum Bacche Hindustan Ke	Dhanpat Mehta
5	Ho Sakta Hai	Wilson Louis
6	Anumati	B.R. Ishara
7	Aryan (1988 film)	Priyadarshan

=== Lead actor – Serials ===
No.	Serial	Channel	Episodes	Director
1	Campus	Zee TV	140	Sanjiv Bhattacharya
2	Mamta	Doordarshan	Short Story	Sanjiv Bhattacharya
3	Parivartan	Zee TV	80	Vijay Pande
4	C.I.D. & Aahat	Sony TV	26	B.P. Singh, Santram Varma
5	Karam	Sony Sab	52	Swapna Joshi
6	Kuch Khona Hai Kuch Paana hai	Doordarshan	52	Anurag Basu & Kumar
7	Bandhan	Doordarshan	40	Sunil Kumar
8	Kahani Terrii Merrii	Sony TV	60	Garry Bindar
9	Mano Ya Na Mano	Zee TV	9	Swapna Joshi & Shriram Raghvan
10	Manpasand Ki Shaadi	Colors TV		

=== Other Serials ===
No.	serial	Director
1	Tehkikaat	Vijay Anand
2	Itihas	Indarjeet
3	Janbaaz	Indarjeet
4	Saat Phere	Madan Bawaria
5	Captain House	Swapna Joshi Waghmare
6	Ahankar	Swapna Joshi Waghmare
7	Kusum	
8	Titali	Govind Munis
9	Capital A	Sanjiv Bhattacharya

=== Marathi Serials ===
No.	serial	Director
1	Shahu Maharaj	Satish Randive
2	He Daiva Janile Kuni	Manohar Sarvankar
3	Athang	Kumar Soni & Gajendra Ahire
4	Gahire Paani	Ratnakar Matkari
5	Duheri	Gautam Koli
6	Mumbai police	Raju Parsekar
7	Tisra Dola	Vinayak Chaskar & Shyam Malekar
8	Aamhi Doghe Raja Rani	T. Surendra
9	Oon Paus	Dnyanesh Bhalekar
10	Hasa Chakat Fu	Kedar Shinde
11	Kumari Gangubai Non-Matric	Rajesh Deshpande
12	Tu Ashi Jawali Raha	
13	Saare Tujhyachsathi	Manish Khandelwal
14	Aai Kuthe Kay Karte!	Rajan Shahi

=== Telefilms ===
No.	serial	Director
1	He Daiva Janile Kuni	Manohar Sarvankar
2	Judgement	Govind Saraiya
3	Aur Ek Kahani	Raju Parsekar
4	Sweekar	Harish Tulaskar
5	Aksar	Swapna Joshi
6	Arpan	Kumar Soni
7	Toote Rishte	
8	Raat	Ratnakar Matkari
9	Khushboo	Swapna Joshi Waghmare

== Awards and nominations ==
Won an award at the Honolulu Film Festival for a short film called 'Did You Notice?' Vishesh Lakshavedi Kalakar by Zee Talkies for Marathi Film "Amhi Ka Tisare", Vishesh Lakshavedi Kalakar by Sankruti Kala Darpan for Marathi Film "Amhi Ka Tisar", Best Actor Nomination by Maharashtra State for Marathi Film "He Khel Nashibache", Best Actor Nomination by Zee Talkies for Marathi Film "Bhavachi Laxmi", Best Supporting Actor Nomination by Zee Talkies for Marathi Film "Sakha Bhau Pakka Vairi".

== See also ==
- List of Indian film actors
