= Smita Bansal =

Indian television actress (born 1977)

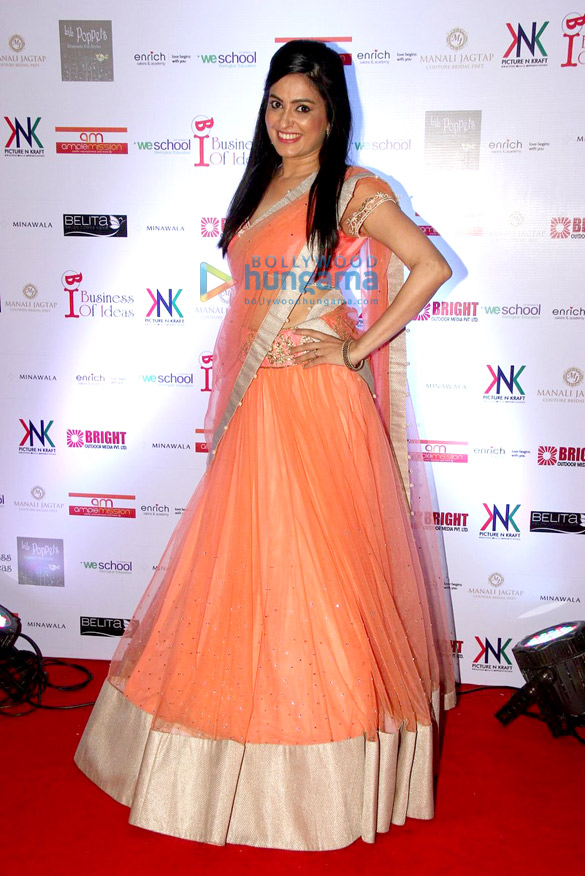
- Smita Bansal in 2015
- Born: 21 February 1977 (age 49)
- Occupation: Actress
- Years active: 1998–present
- Spouse: Ankush Mohla (m. 2002)
- Children: 2

Smita Bansal (born 21 February 1977) is an Indian television actress. Her notable roles include the Zee TV's Amanat, Aashirwad, Sarhadein and Sony SAB's Aladdin – Naam Toh Suna Hoga. She has also acted in the 2008 Bollywood film Karzzzz. She won ITA Award for Best Actress in a Supporting Role and Indian Telly Award for Best Actress in a Supporting Role for the serial Balika Vadhu.

== Filmography ==
=== Films ===
- 1998: Daya (Malayalam) as Princess
- 2000: Hum To Mohabbat Karega as Sanjana, Press Reporter
- 2008: Karzzzz (Hindi) as Jyoti Verma / Pinky

== Television ==
Year	Serial	Role	Notes
1998–1999	Challenge	Sonali	Lead role
2000	Tulsi	Tulsi	Lead role
1996–1997	Itihaas	Padmini	Supporting role
1997–2002	Amanat	Dr. Bala	Supporting role
1998	Cincinnati Bubblaboo	Saleswoman	Supporting role
1998	Alpviram	Shweta	Supporting role
1998	X Zone - Neha: Part 1 - Part 4	Episode 4 - Episode 7	Episodic role
1998–1999	Kora Kagaz	Priya	Supporting role
1998–1999	Daal Mein Kala	Julie	Supporting role
1998–2001	Aashirwad	Vishakha	Supporting role
1999	X Zone - Talaash: Part 1 & Part 2	Episode 42 - Episode 43	Episodic role
1999	Saturday Suspense - Hamen Sab Pata Hai	Episode 105	Episodic role
1999	Rishtey - Ek Ghar Ye Bhi	Tulika (Episode 60)	Episodic role
1999	Rishtey - Naya Vivah	Asha (Episode 70)	Episodic role
1999	Aahat - The last reel: Part 1 & Part 2, Tina: Part 1 & Part 2	Sitara (Episode 196 & Episode 197) /Tina (Episode 204 & Episode 205)	Episodic role
1999–2000	Saath Saath		Supporting role
2001	Kahaani Ghar Ghar Kii	Nivedita Kamal Agarwal	Supporting role
2001	Ssshhhh...Koi Hai - Tantrik	Shweta (Episode 4)	Episodic role
2001–2002	Sanskruti	Payal	Supporting role
2001–2003	Sarhadein	Chandni	Lead role
2002–2003	Kohi Apna Sa	Shruti Tushar Gill / Mallika Singhania	Lead role
2003	Vikraal Aur Gabraal - Tantrik	Shweta (Episode 9)	Episodic role
2003–2004	Sanjivani	Neha	Supporting role
2004	Raat Hone Ko Hai - Drishti: Part 1 - Part 4	Priyanka (Episode 53 - Episode 56)	Episodic role
2004–2005	C.I.D.	Inspector Aditi	Supporting role
2004–2005	Piya Ka Ghar	Shweta Avinash Sharma	Negative role
2004–2005	Ye Meri Life Hai	Poornima	Supporting role
2005	Fame Gurukul	Contestant	Reality show
2006	Twinkle Beauty Parlour Lajpat Nagar	Niyati	Lead role
2006	Kasautii Zindagii Kay	Nivedita Basu / Nivedita Anupam Sengupta	Supporting role
2006	Jeena Isi Ka Naam Hai	Guest (Episode 9)	Talk show
2006–2007	Viraasat	Gargi Kunal Kharbanda	Supporting role
2007	Jeete Hain Jiske Liye		Negative role
2008–2009	Paani Puri	Divya Paani	Lead role
2008–2014	Balika Vadhu	Sumitra Bhairon Singh	Supporting role
2011	Fear Factor - Khatron Ke Khiladi Season 4	Contestant	Reality show
2012–2013	Nach Baliye 5	Contestant	Reality show
2013	Comedy Nights with Kapil	Guest (Episode 19)	Comedy show
2014	Akbar Birbal - Akbar Ki Pehli Begum: Part 1 - Part 3	Umrao Jaan	Episodic role
2014–2015	Tum Aise Hi Rehna	Lata Verma / Lata Vishesh Agarwal	Supporting role
2015–2016	Zindagi Abhi Baaki Hai Mere Ghost	Radha Suraj Palekar	Supporting role
2016–2017	Jaana Na Dil Se Door	Suman Ramakant Vashisht	Negative role
2018–2019	Nazar	Divya Nishant Sharma	Supporting role
2018–2021	Aladdin - Naam Toh Suna Hoga	Rukhsar	Supporting role
2019–2020	Yehh Jadu Hai Jinn Ka!	Parveen Junaid Khan	Hidden Antagonist turned Supporting Character
2021–2025	Bhagya Lakshmi	Neelam Veerendra Oberoi	Supporting role
2026	The Pyramid Scheme	Pramila Singh	
2026	108 Base Hospital – Uri	Lt. Col. Principal Matron Kavita Jha	

=== Theater ===
- Get Rid Of My Wife with Paritosh Painter

=== Music video ===
She appeared in music video of Marathi song 'Gaarva' sung by Milind Ingle

== Accolades ==
Year	Work	Award	Category	Result
2008	Balika Vadhu	Indian Telly Award	Best Actress in a Supporting Role	Won
2009	Balika Vadhu	Indian Telly Award	Best Actress in a Supporting Role	Nominated
2013	Balika Vadhu	Indian Telly Award	Best Actress in a Supporting Role	Nominated

== See also ==
- List of Indian television actresses
