= Yuvah =

- VCD cover
- Directed by: K Narendra Babu
- Produced by: Manish Bansal, SDP Productions
- Starring: Kartik Shetty, Madhu Sharma
- Cinematography: Mujunatha Nayaka
- Music by: Gurukiran
- Release date: 1 June 2009
- Country: India
- Language: Kannada

Yuvah (variously Yuva) is a 2009 Kannada action film starring Kartik Shetty and Madhu Sharma. It was directed by K Narendra Babu.

== Cast ==
- Kartik Shetty as Jeevan Prakash
- Madhu Sharma as Sridevi
- Gulshan Grover
- Lal as Dhoni
- Chandrasekar as Venky
- Ramesh Bhat as Jeevan Prakash's father
- Shobaraj as Police officer
- Jai Jagadish
- Ashok Rao
- Ruthu
- Bullet Prakash

== Reception ==
=== Critical response ===
R G Vijayasarathy of Rediff.com scored the film at 2.5 out of 5 stars and says "Actually Babu should have concentrated more in getting good performnces [sic] from his lead actors. Karrthick is good in fights, but he is deficient in many critical sequences of the film. Madhu Sharma could have added little more meat to her role. Bollywood actor Gulshan Grover, Malayalam actor Manoj K Jayan and Kannada actor Shobharaj are quite effective in their roles. Ramesh Bhat and the film's younger villain Chandrashekhar have done well too. All in all, Yuvah is a good action film minus a good story". A critic from The New Indian Express wrote "The more he tries to keep away from the dark underworld, the more it pursues him. The story gets tied together with how Karthik manages to teach the antisocial elements a lesson and also gets united with the love of his life. Yuva is a worthwhile watch if actionpacked love stories interest you". A critic from Bangalore Mirror wrote "The director also loses grip on the narration in the first half. Lack of attention to detail is also evident as in the case of an engineering college lecturer teaching from an income tax text book. But Yuvah despite all the drawbacks is a decent effort and is worth a watch". A critic from IANS wrote that "Yuvah is technically sound but the lack of a good, original storyline and average performances from lead artists are a let down. But action film lovers will enjoy the film". A critic from The Times of India wrote that "Director K Narendra Babu has done a good job with this action-packed story with excellent narration, controlled script and sensible placement of sequences".
