= Salim Ghouse =

Indian film, television and theatre actor (1951–2022)

- Born: 10 January 1952; Madras, Madras State (now in) Tamil Nadu, India
- Died: 28 April 2022 (aged 70); Mumbai, Maharashtra, India
- Occupations: Actor; theater director; martial artist
- Spouse: Anita Salim
- Children: 2

Salim Ghouse (10 January 1952 – 28 April 2022) was an Indian film, television and theatre actor, theatre director, and martial artist. He has acted in Hindi, Tamil, Telugu, Malayalam and English films.

== Early life ==
Salim Ghouse was born in Chennai to a Dakhni Muslim father and a Christian mother. He studied at the Christ Church Anglo-Indian Higher Secondary School and the Presidency College in Chennai. He was also a graduate of the Film and Television Institute of India, Pune.

== Career ==
Salim Ghouse is known for his role in the TV series Subah and for playing Rama, Krishna and Tipu Sultan in Shyam Benegal's TV Series Bharat Ek Khoj. He has also worked in TV serial Wagle Ki Duniya.

In 1989, he portrayed the villain in the Tamil film Vettri Vizhaa, directed by Pratap Pothen as the rival to Kamal Haasan. He starred alongside Mohanlal in the Malayalam movie Thazhvaram, directed by Bharathan. In 1993 he played the villain in Mani Ratnam's film Thiruda Thiruda. He acted alongside Madhuri Dixit and Shahrukh Khan in the 1997 film Koyla.

== Personal life ==
Salim Ghouse was married to Anita. They have a son and daughter. Apart from acting, Salim Ghouse was proficient in martial arts such as karate and tai chi.

Salim Ghouse died on Thursday 28 April 2022 at the age of 70 in Mumbai after suffering from a cardiac arrest. His last rites were performed early on Thursday morning.

== Filmography ==
Year	Film	Role	Language	Notes
1978	Swarg Narak	Student	Hindi	
1978	Sigappu Rojakkal	Jailer	Tamil	
1981	Kalyug	Desai	Hindi	
1981	Chakra	Raghu	Hindi	
1984	Saaransh	Gajanan Chitre's henchman	Hindi	
1984	Mohan Joshi Hazir Ho!	Promoter 2	Hindi	
1985	Trikal		Hindi	
1985	Aghaat	Comrade Naidu	Hindi	
1986	Amma	Revolutionary Freedom Fighter (Uncredited Role)	Hindi	
1988	The Deceivers	Piroo	English	
1988	The Perfect Murder	Caste-Marks Goonda	English	
1989	Vettri Vizhaa	Zinda	Tamil	
1989	Mujrim	Africa assassinator	Hindi	
1989	Suryaa: An Awakening	Ramu Gulzar	Hindi	
1990	Thazhvaram	Raju / Raghavan	Malayalam	
1992	Antham	Inspector Kannabiran	Telugu	Bilingual film
1992	Drohi	Inspector Kannabiran	Hindi	Bilingual film
1992	Zulm Ki Hukumat	Police Inspector Suryavanshi	Hindi	
1992	Chinna Gounder	Sakkarai Gounder	Tamil	
1992	Magudam	Thillainathan	Tamil	
1992	Senthamizh Paattu	Rajarathnam	Tamil	
1993	Aakanksha	Arjun Singh	Hindi	
1993	Rakshana	Chinna	Telugu	
1993	Dharma Seelan	Pradeep Chakravarthi	Tamil	
1993	Thiruda Thiruda	T. T. Vikram	Tamil	
1994	Mugguru Monagallu		Telugu	
1994	Seeman	Masanam	Tamil	
1996	Sardari Begum	Sen	Urdu/Hindi	
1997	Koyla	Brijwa	Hindi	
1997	Shapath	Lankeshwar	Hindi	
1998	Maharaja	Ranvir Singh	Hindi	
1998	Soldier	Jaswant Dalal / DK	Hindi	
2000	Badal	Rajbeer	Hindi	
2001	Aks	Blind Guru	Hindi	
2001	Indian	Francis	Hindi	
2002	Red	Srini	Tamil	
2005	Udayon	Perumal	Malayalam	
2005	Daas	Vappa	Tamil	
2005	Missed Call	Arindam Kumar Sengputa	Hindi	
2005	Chanakya	Police commissioner	Tamil	
2009	Vettaikaaran	Vedhanayagam	Tamil	
2010	Well Done Abba	Janarthan Reddy	Hindi	
2026	Kaa – The Forest	Victor Mahadevan	Tamil	

=== Television ===
Year	Series	Role	Language	Notes
1984	Yeh Jo Hai Zindagi	Venkat	Hindi	
1987	Subah	Bharat	Hindi	
1988	Bharat Ek Khoj	Various characters	Hindi	
1998	X Zone		Hindi	
2014	Samvidhaan	V. I. Munswamy Pillay	Hindi/English	

=== Dubbing roles ===
Year	Film title	Character	Actor	Dub Language	Notes
1995	The Lion King	Scar	Jeremy Irons (voice)	Hindi	
2000	Sudhandhiram	Sopraj	Sharat Saxena	Tamil	
2006	300	King Leonidas	Gerard Butler	Hindi	
