= Chooriyan =

- Theatrical release poster
- चूड़ियाँ
- Directed by: Sukhwant Dhadda
- Produced by: Vivek Kumar
- Starring: Gracy Singh; Vinod Khanna; Sudhanshu Pandey
- Cinematography: Shaji Karun
- Edited by: A. Sreekar Prasad
- Music by: Sukhvinder Singh; Sardool Sikander
- Release date: 19 June 2015
- Country: India
- Language: Punjabi

Chooriyan is a Punjabi Indian family drama film directed by Sukhwant Dhadda, starring Gracy Singh, Vinod Khanna, Sudhanshu Pandey, and others. The movie was released on 19 June 2015.

== Plot ==
Simran, an orphan who has always wanted a large family, seems to have her dreams come true when she marries Aman, a soldier. When Aman dies in an accident, Simran must honor her vow to take care of the family and keep it united.

== Cast ==
Cast of the film is-

- Gracy Singh
- Vinod Khanna
- Sudhanshu Pandey
- Vikas Bhalla
- Jonita Doda
- Parikshat Sahni
- Pankaj Dheer

== Marketing ==
The trailer of the film was released on 28 May 2015 on YouTube.
