= Ravi Gosain =

Indian actor

Ravi Gossain
- Born: India
- Occupation: Actor
- Years active: 1994-present
- Known for: Maachis & Shootout at Lokhandwala thumb: Amanat

Ravi Gossain is an Indian actor in movies and TV serials. He has worked in serials like Amanat as Nigoda, in Sarhadein as Sohail and on Zee TV's Fear Files: Darr Ki Sacchi Tasvirein. He was recognised for his role in the 1996 Hindi movie Maachis, where he played the character of Kuldip. He also appeared in Shootout at Lokhandwala as Aslam Chikna. Ravi, along with actor Priya Arya, heads the production house called Spicy Smile India Pvt Ltd.

== Filmography ==
=== Film ===
| Year | Film | Role |
|---|---|---|
| 1995 | Oh Darling Yeh Hai India | |
| 1996 | Daayraa | Macho Man |
| 1996 | Maachis | Kuldeep |
| 1998 | Hazaar Chaurasi Ki Maa | Somu |
| 1999 | Pyaar Koi Khel Nahin | Ashok Khanna |
| 2003 | Raja Bhaiya | Anwar |
| 2004 | Raghu Romeo | Party Guest |
| 2004 | Bali | Hyder Ali |
| 2005 | The Film | Raman Rawal |
| 2006 | Chingaari | Chintu |
| 2006 | Katputtli | |
| 2006 | Zindaggi Rocks | Sam |
| 2007 | Shootout at Lokhandwala | Aslam Kasai |
| 2008 | Sunday | Hiren Shetty |
| 2008 | Shaurya | Captain Passbola |
| 2009 | Aasma: The Sky Is the Limit | Ranjeet |
| 2009 | Fox | Constable Gaitonde |
| 2014 | Dedh Ishqiya | Liyaakat Ali |
| 2014 | Jal | Rakla |
| 2017 | Shaadi Abhi Baaki Hai | |
| 2017 | Julie 2 | Film Writer |
| 2019 | The Gandhi Murder | Narayan Apte |
| 2019 | Mooso - The Mouse | Nandkishore |
| 2022 | Soorya | Inspector |

=== Television ===
| Year | Serial | Role |
|---|---|---|
| 1994-1995 | Tehkikaat | Episodic role |
| 1998-1999 | Saturday Suspense | Episodic role |
| 1998-2001 | Rishtey | Episodic role |
| 1998 | Amanat | Nigoda |
| 1999 | Aahat | Episodic role |
| 1999-2000 | X Zone | Episodic role |
| 2001 | Suraag – The Clue | Rakesh Kumar "Rocky" |
| 2001-2003 | Sarhadein | Sohail |
| 2003 | Ssshhhh...Koi Hai | episodic role |
| 2006 | Left Right Left | Lt Bunty Choubey (Mess Cook) |
| 2009 | Mahima Shani Dev Ki | Rishi Markandeya |
| 2009 | Aahat | Episodic role |
| 2010 | Do Saheliyaan... Kismat Ki Kathputaliyaan | Omkar Lodha |
| 2012 | Fear Files | Ashok |
| 2012-2016 | SuperCops Vs Super Villains | Sathish/ Malhar/Episodic roles |
| 2014 | Encounter | Kallan |
| 2016- 2019 | Savdhaan India | Trilokchand |
| 2016- 2019 | Savdhaan India | Amrish/ Episodic roles |
| 2016- 2019 | Savdhaan India | Sangraam |
| 2016 | Silsila Pyaar Ka | Harsh Chandra Sanyal |
| 2016 | Ek Rishta Saajhedari Ka | pivotal role |
| 2018 | Mitegi Laxman Rekha | Nandan |
| 2018 | Namune | |
| 2018 | Agniphera | |
| 2019 | Ishq Mein Marjawan | Mohan Sharma |
| 2019 | Laal Ishq | Bhushan/Mishra Ji/Bhanu Rai |
| 2019 | Vikram Betaal Ki Rahasya Gatha | Vashishta |
| 2019 | Crime Alert | Episodic role |
| 2019-2020 | Bepanah Pyaar | Gulshan Saxena |
| 2020 | Kartik Purnima | Kuldeep Arora |
| 2020 | Tera Yaar Hoon Main | Rakesh Kumar Agarwal |
| 2021 | Meet: Badlegi Duniya Ki Reet | Inspector Ashok Hooda |
| 2021 | Aye Mere Humsafar | Raghunath |
| 2021–2022 | Nath – Zewar Ya Zanjeer | Avtar Singh Thakur |
| 2022 | Sab Satrangi | Dinesh |
| 2022 | Ali Baba: Dastaan-E-Kabul | Usman |
| 2022–2023 | Dil Diyaan Gallaan | Randeep "Rana" Singh Brar |
| 2024 | Mehndi Wala Ghar | Ajay "Ajju" Agarwal |
| 2024 | Dhruv Tara – Samay Sadi Se Pare | Raviraj Seth |
| 2024 | Main Dil Tum Dhadkan | Ravi Raj Rana |
| 2025 | Zyada Mat Udd | |
| 2025 | Megha Barsenge | Trilochan "Tilli" Kohli |
