= Hai Golmaal in White House =

Hai Golmaal In White House
- Directed by: Salar Shaikh
- Written by: Saajan Agarwal
- Produced by: A.K.MISHRA
- Starring: Rajpal Yadav; Govind Namdeo; Pratima Kazmi; Vijay Raaz; Yashpal Sharma
- Music by: Shamir Tandon
- Production company: Vision Corporation Ltd
- Release date: 14 September 2015
- Running time: 143 minutes
- Country: India
- Language: Hindi
- Budget: 40,00,000 INR
- Box office: 2,75,000 INR

Hai Golmaal In White House is a 2015 Indian comedy-drama film directed by Salar Shaikh, starring Rajpal Yadav, Govind Namdeo, Pratima Kazmi, Vijay Raaz and Yashpal Sharma. It was released on 23 June 2013.

== Plot ==
The movie is about people living in a white house. Four gorgeous women are looking for a house to rent; they find a house named "White House". They find that the other people residing there are unique characters, living hard and boring lives.

== Cast ==
- Rajpal Yadav
- Govind Namdev
- Pratima Kazmi
- Vijay Raaz
- Yashpal Sharma

== Soundtrack ==
All songs were composed by Shamir Tandon.

- "Baithe Baithe Dil Ko" – Kailash Kher
- "Dil Lagane Ko Jab Dil" – Asha Bhosle
- "Door Jao Na Tum" – Kunal Ganjawala
- "Ek Ladki Se Aaj Main" – N/A
- "Ek To Pyaar Ki Umar Hai" – N/A
