= Than Than Gopal =

- Official Logo
- Directed by: Kartik Shetty
- Written by: Kartik Shetty
- Starring: Milind Gunaji; Milind Gawali; Vivek Chabukswar; Suzanne Bernert
- Cinematography: Manjunatha Nayaka
- Edited by: Dattatreya Ghodke
- Music by: Simaab Sen
- Production company: Om Ganesh Production
- Release date: 30 October 2015
- Running time: 113 Min
- Country: India
- Language: Marathi
- Budget: ₹1.5 crore (US$160,000)
- Box office: ₹3.81 crore (US$400,000)

Than Than Gopal is a 2015 Marathi film directed by Kartik Shetty and features Vivek Chabukswar. This film is produced by Om Ganesh Production and the Mahurat of the film featured actor Akshay Kumar.

== Cast ==
- Milind Gunaji
- Milind Gawali
- Vivek Chabukswar
- Suzanne Bernert

== Production ==
Shooting of the film began 30 May 2014 in Warli Village Valwanda near Jawahar. The team also shot in locations across Mumbai.

== Reception ==
A critic from Zee Talkies wrote that "The film does well overall and is worth the watch. The performances deserve to be seen, but the theme itself deserves plaudits".
