= Sarhadein =

- Created by: UTV Software Communications
- Written by: Ranbir Pushp; Praveen Raj; Pranay Singh
- Directed by: Rakesh Sarang
- Starring: see below
- Country of origin: India
- Original language: Hindi
- No. of episodes: 91

Production
- Producers: Ronnie Screwvala; Zarina Mehta; Deven Khote
- Production locations: Kuala Lumpur, Malaysia
- Running time: approx. 24 minutes

Original release
- Network: Zee TV
- Release: 26 September 2001 – 18 June 2003

Sarhadein is an Indian television series which aired on Zee TV . The story narrates the similarities between the people living in two countries. Besides, it won a numerous awards at the time it was on-air, such as the Indian television actor Govind Namdeo won "Best Actor in a Negative Role" award for his role "Kedar Nath" at the Indian Telly Awards in 2002. The series was produced by UTV Software Communications and set in the backdrop of Kuala Lumpur, Malaysia. It averaged 1.5 TRPs at the time it was on air.

== Overview ==
Sarhadein is a love story of an Indian girl and a Pakistani boy who fall in love with each other while studying in Kuala Lumpur. They get together by a case of mistaken identities but religion and restrictions loom over their love. Now the question remains is that will their parents' be able to accept their relationship once they go back to India and Pakistan? Will the society ever approve of their love, since they belong to different religion and enemy neighboring countries.

== Cast ==
- Smita Bansal as Chandni
- Aamir Bashir as Aman
- Hussain Kuwajerwala as Annu
- Govind Namdev as Kedarnath
- Vaquar Shaikh as Rajesh
- Ravi Gossain as Sohail
- Kuljeet Randhawa as Sheena
- Kishwer Merchant as Pranati
- Shagufta Ali
- Ali Asgar
- Surendra Pal
- Sudha Shivpuri
- Amar Talwar
- Homi Wadia
- Kusumit Sana
