= Poonam Narula =

Indian actress

Poonam Narula Goel
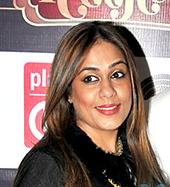
- Goel in September 2015
- Born: Poonam Narula
- Occupations: Actress; model
- Years active: 1995–2005; 2008; 2010
- Known for: Kasautii Zindagii Kay
- Spouse: Manish Goel (m. 2002)
- Children: 2

Poonam Narula is an Indian television actress. She is known for her roles in Shararat and Kasautii Zindagii Kay. In 2005, she participated in Nach Baliye 1 and became the 1st runner-up.

== Career ==
Poonam started her career on television after taking acting lessons from Ashok Kumar’s acting academy in Mumbai. She was seen in Star Plus TV show Shararat where she played one of the female lead roles in the sitcom. Within a short span of her entry, she won the hearts of TV audiences and then she was offered TV shows by Balaji Telefilms' Itihaas, Kasautii Zindagii Kay, Mano Ya Na Mano, Kaahin Kissii Roz, Kkusum and Kahaani Ghar Ghar Kii.

== Personal life ==
Poonam married actor Manish Goel in 2002. Together, they have a son and a daughter.

== Television ==
Year	Show	Role
1995	Mano Ya Na Mano	Mehak
1995–1997	Parampara	
1996–1997	Itihaas	Mona
1997	Saturday Suspense	
1997–1998	Vishwaas	Poonam
1997–1998	Safar	Anita
1998–2001	Aashirwad	Amita Deshmukh
1998–2003	Aurat	
1999–2000	X Zone	
1999–2000	Kartavya	
1999–2000	Saath Saath	
1999–2000	Kanyadaan	
2000–2001	Kasamm	Priyanka Vishal Bhatia
2000–2001	Karz Pichhle Janam Ka	
2001–2002	Kutumb	Nandini Mittal
2001–2003	Kasautii Zindagii Kay	Nivedita Basu / Nivedita Anupam Sengupta
2003	Kahani Terrii Merrii	Rajita
2003–2004	Shararat	Radha Suraj Malhotra
2003–2005	Kkusum	Mahi Abhay Kapoor
2005	Nach Baliye 1	Contestant (1st Runner-up)
	Astitva Ek Pehchaan	
2008	Ustaadon Ka Ustaad	Contestant
2010	Meethi Choori No 1	Contestant

== Awards ==
Year	Award	Category	Work	Result
2002	India Television Academy Awards	Best Actress in a Supporting Role	Kasautii Zindagii Kay	Nominated
