= Amanat (Indian TV series) =

- Genre: Drama
- Written by: Mir Muneer
- Directed by: Sanjiv Bhattacharya, Indrajit; Santram Varma
- Starring: See below
- Opening theme: "Amanat" by Sonu Nigam
- Country of origin: India
- Original language: Hindi
- No. of episodes: 263

Production
- Producers: Sanjiv Bhattacharya; Sapna Bhattacharya
- Camera setup: Multi-camera
- Running time: 24 minutes

Original release
- Network: Zee TV
- Release: 21 August 1997 – 5 September 2002

Amanat is an Indian soap opera that premiered on Zee TV on 21 August 1997. '

== Synopsis ==
The story is about a staunchly traditional Indian man, Lahori Ram, who holds a strong set of values and beliefs. His life revolves around his seven daughters: Santosh, Dinky, Bala, Guddi, Bunty, Munni, and Totey, each with her own peculiarities and problems.

Lahori Ram, who is originally from Pakistan, moves to India after the partition of India. The world has progressed – or grown corrupt, depending on how you look at it – but his values and traditions have not changed with the advent of modern times. Having lost his wife early in life, he has been both father and mother to his girls. He has lavished all his love and affection on them and kept them in the constraints of a stern middle-class morality. The bond between the sisters is extremely close. Not having a mother in their formative years has forged among them a strong comradeship. Their shared moments of happiness and grief, their love and admiration for their father, and the desire never to hurt him are their common ground.

It is only when they get married and go into different families, with varied backgrounds and cultural environments, some rich, some poor, that real conflicts start. For each, it is a struggle between fealty to the family of the husband and the love they have for their sisters. Lahori Ram is supportive like a rock and compassionate as a parent, without hurting one for the sake of the other. But it is a tricky tightrope which he treads with skill. Like the tributaries of a mighty river, the life of each girl breaks free from the confines of family and flows to a distant place, while still being a part of the older stream. Lahori Ram, too, follows the happiness and heartaches of his daughters with fond indulgence and parental concern. They are his "amanat" (legacy), reared with love and bestowed one by one like a legacy on someone else. Each parent goes through these profound experiences, sooner or later, when daughters come of age, and depart as brides, leaving behind only sweet memories.

== Cast ==
- Sudhir Pandey as Lala Lahori Ram
- Bharat Kapoor as Ahmed Khan
- Pooja Madan as Santosh (eldest daughter of Lahori Ram)
- Avinash Sahijwani as Chander (Husband of Santosh)
- Gracy Singh as Dinky a.k.a. Amrita (second eldest daughter)
- Randeep Singh as Amit (Dinky's husband)
- Smita Bansal as Dr. Bala (third eldest daughter)
- Shreyas Talpade as Dr. Manoj (Bala's husband)
- Gayatri Zariwala as Guddi (fourth eldest daughter)
- Harsh Khurana as Rohan (ndi's husband)
- Ritu Vashisht as Bunty (fifth eldest daughter)
- Nimrata Gill as sixth eldest daughter
- Raj Kaushal as husband of Santosh
- Lata Haya as Lata (Lahori's sister)
- Kavita Vaid as Kavita (Lahori's sister)
- Ravi Gossain as Nigoda
- Chand Dhar as Mr. Kapoor (Chandar and Inder's father)
- Rita Bhaduri as Gayatri Kapoor (Chandar and Inder's mother)
- Swapnil Joshi as Inder (Chandar's younger brother, Bunty's husband)
- Amardeep Jha as Amit's mother
- Vishnu Sharma as Advocate Narang (Amit's father)
- Arif Zakaria as Azhar (son of Ahmed Khan)
- Gopi Bhalla as Titu Singh
