= Kahani Terrii Merrii =

- Created by: Ekta Kapoor
- Directed by: Garry Bhinder
- Creative director: Nivedita Basu
- Opening theme: Kahaani Terrii Merrii by Sonu Nigam and Priya Bhattacharya
- Country of origin: India
- Original language: Hindi
- No. of seasons: 1
- No. of episodes: 112

Production
- Producers: Ekta Kapoor; Shobha Kapoor
- Production locations: Mumbai, Maharashtra, India
- Cinematography: C. Viginesh
- Editor: Dharmesh Shah
- Camera setup: Single-camera
- Running time: 24 minutes
- Production company: Balaji Telefilms

Original release
- Network: Sony Entertainment Television
- Release: 2003

Kahani Terrii Merrii (transl. Story yours and mine) is a television series produced by Ekta Kapoor (Balaji Telefilms), broadcast on Sony TV in 2003. Nivedita Basu was the creative head of the show and it was directed by Garry Bhinder.

The story is a family drama that revolves around a business family in Kolkata, the Chakravartys. The opening title song was sung by Sonu Nigam and Priya Bhattacharya, with choreography by Saroj Khan.

== Plot ==
Kahani Terrii Merrii is the story of a joint Bengali family. The male protagonist of the show Dhruv and his childhood friend Tara fall in love in adulthood and get married. However, having suffered through loneliness in his childhood after his father left his mother for another woman, Dhruv has grown up to be an alcoholic. Despite Tara's love and support, he is unable to give up his addiction.

Some of his family members want to separate Dhruv and Tara, especially Dhruv's sister-in-law. Gradually, Tara helps Dhruv get control of his life and become a better person. When Tara's friend and businesswoman Rajita (Poonam Narula) enters their lives, Dhruv clashes with her but soon they begin an affair and fall in love.

Dhruv doesn't realize that he commits the same mistake as his father by falling for another woman and ruining his marital life. Tara discovers their illegitimate relationship and confronts Dhruv who finally realizes his mistake. But Tara does not forgive him. When Dhruv's mother becomes aware of her son's actions, she sympathises with Tara who is in the same situation that she was many years ago. She supports Tara's decision to leave Dhruv and encourages her to move on from him. The show ends with Tara leaving Dhruv while he repents his actions.

== Cast ==
- Manav Gohil as Dhruv
- Tina Parekh as Tara
- Poonam Narula as Rajita
- Sai Ballal
- Shama Deshpande
- Urvashi Dholakia as Kajol
- Milind Gawali
- Kavita Kaushik as Kavita
- Hrishikesh Pandey as Shom
- Sikandar Kharbanda

== Reception ==
Kahani Terrii Merrii was launched with much promise. The show replaced the hit drama Kutumb and was touted to be one of the expensive television shows of that time. The show was loosely inspired by the grandeur of Devdas. Despite the lavish sets and a huge cast, the show failed to impress the audiences and critics alike. The reception of the show was poor all over and ratings were dismal. The show thus ended abruptly. It was replaced by the critically acclaimed Naam Gumm Jayega.
