= Subah (TV series) =

- Based on: Avan by Sivasankari
- Directed by: Bharat Rangachary
- Country of origin: India
- Original language: Hindi

Production
- Running time: approximately 25 minutes

Original release
- Network: DD National
- Release: 1987

Subah is an Indian television series that aired on DD National in 1987 directed by Bharat Rangachary. It is based on a novel by Sivasankari, titled Avan. The title song for the series, "Aye zamane tere samne aa gaye", was sung by R. D. Burman.

== Plot ==
The story is about an innocent young man joining college, his friendship with a junkie Salim Ghouse, and how he falls for drugs.

== Cast ==
- Salim Ghouse as Bharat
- Kumar Bhatia as Prem
