= Gracy Singh =

Indian actress (born 1980)

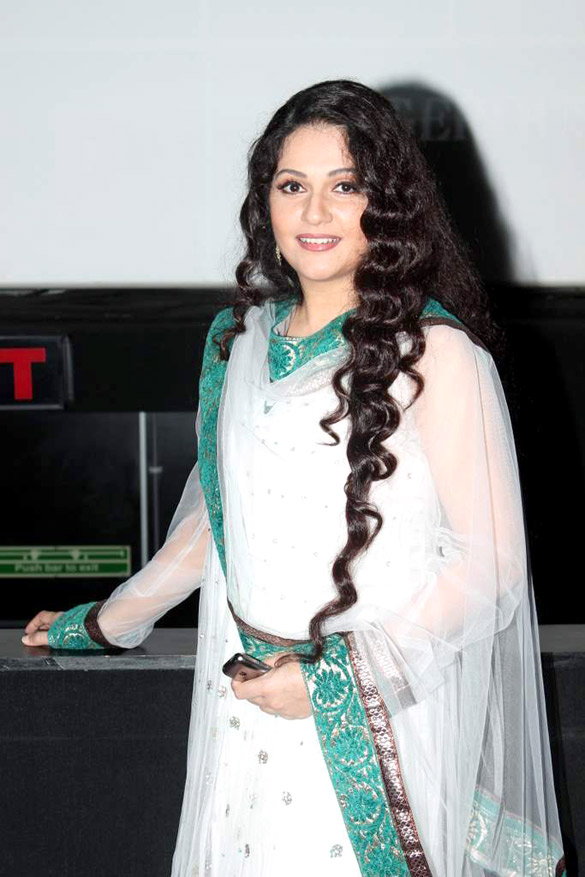
- Singh in 2012
- Born: 20 July 1980 (age 46); Delhi, India
- Occupations: Actress; dancer
- Years active: 1997–2021

Gracy Singh (born 20 July 1980) is an Indian actress who primarily worked in Hindi and Telugu films. She is best known for her role in the films Lagaan (2001) and Munna Bhai M.B.B.S (2003). Singh is also a trained Bharatnatyam and Odissi dancer.

== Career ==
Born in Delhi, India, Singh began her career touring with the dance group "The Planets". Her first acting role was in the 1997 television soap, Amanat. She then went on to star opposite Aamir Khan in Ashutosh Gowariker's epic sports-drama Lagaan, where she played a village belle. She was nominated in this role for the Filmfare Award for Best Female Debut, and won the Screen Award for Most Promising Newcomer – Female.

Post Lagaan, Singh appeared in a few successful films in Hindi and Telugu including Munna Bhai M.B.B.S. and Santosham. She has also starred in Punjabi films such as Lakh Pardesi Hoye and a Malayalam film Loudspeaker directed by Jayaraj.

In 2015, Singh returned to television, playing Goddess Santoshi in the series Santoshi Maa on &TV.

== Filmography ==
Year(s)	Title	Role	Language	Notes	Ref.
1999	Hu Tu Tu	Shanti	Hindi		
1999	Hum Aapke Dil Mein Rehte Hain	Maya	Hindi	Credited as Gracy	
1999	Sundar Bou		Bengali		
2001	Lagaan	Gauri	Hindi		
2002	Santhosham	Padmavathi	Telugu		
2002	Tappu Chesi Pappu Koodu	Radhika Rani	Telugu		
2003	Armaan	Dr. Neha Mathur	Hindi		
2003	Gangaajal	Anuradha	Hindi		
2003	Munna Bhai M.B.B.S.	Dr. Suman "Chinki" Asthana	Hindi		
2004	Muskaan	Muskaan	Hindi		
2004	Shart: The Challenge	Sonam Kapoor	Hindi		
2005	Wajahh: A Reason to Kill	Trishna Bhargava	Hindi		
2005	Yehi Hai Zindagi	Vasundhara Rao	Hindi		
2006	The White Land	Sudha Patel	Hindi		
2007	Lakh Pardesi Hoiye	Neha	Punjabi		
2007	Chanchal	Chanchal	Hindi		
2008	Deshdrohi	Sonia Patil	Hindi		
2008	Dekh Bhai Dekh	Babli Lala	Hindi		
2009	Vighnaharta Shree Siddhivinayak	Herself	Hindi	Guest appearance	
2009	Loudspeaker	Annie	Malayalam		
2009	Aseema	Prof. Aseema L. Patnayak	Hindi		
2009	Meghave Meghave	Charmi aka Chandramukhi	Kannada		
2010	Rama Rama Krishna Krishna	Gauthami	Telugu	Cameo appearance	
2010	Ramdev	Shilpa	Telugu		
2011	Milta Hai Chance By Chance	Megha	Hindi		
2011	Sai Ek Prerna	Herself	Hindi	Guest appearance	
2011	Andhala Doctor	Maria	Marathi		
2012	Dangerous Ishq	Maharani Meerabai	Hindi		
2012	Aappan Pher Milange	Gulaab	Punjabi		
2012	Qayamat Hi Qayamat	Herself	Hindi	Special appearance in a song	
2012	Baba Ramsaa Peer	Dalibai	Hindi		
2013	Mahabharat Aur Barbareek	Morvi	Hindi		
2013	Blue Mountains	Vani Sharma	Hindi		
2013	Samadhi	Mukto	Bengali		
2015	Chooriyan	Simran	Punjabi		

=== Television ===
Year	Serial Jamai Raja	Role	Notes Sister of Madira bedi
1997–2002	Amanat	Amrita	
1998	Prithviraj Chauhan	Chakori	
2015–2017	Santoshi Maa	Santoshi Maa	
2020–2021	Santoshi Maa – Sunayein Vrat Kathayein	Santoshi Maa	

== Awards ==
- 2002: Won - IIFA Award for Star Debut of the Year – Female for Lagaan
- 2002: Won - Screen Award for Most Promising Newcomer – Female for Lagaan
- 2002: Won - Zee Cine Award for Best Female Debut for Lagaan
- 2002: Nominated - Filmfare Award for Best Female Debut for Lagaan
