= Kartik Shetty =

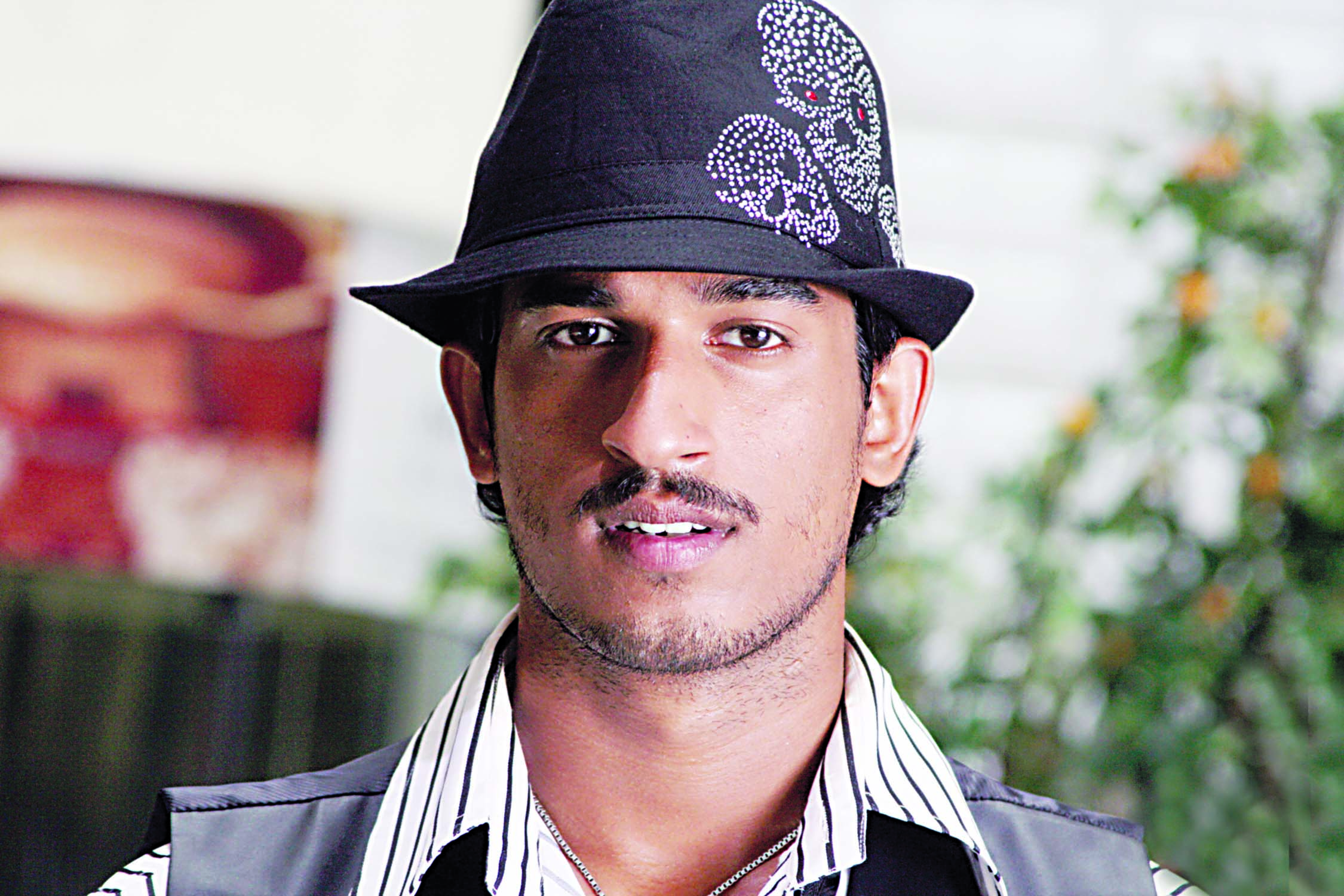
- Born: 4 July 1987 (age 39); Mumbai, Maharashtra, India
- Education: Digital Academy-The Film school (Film & Television Direction)Mumbai
- Occupations: Actor, director
- Years active: 2006–present
- Parent(s): Vijay B. Shetty; Sulatha V. Shetty
- Website: www.kartikshetty.com

Kartik Shetty (also known as Prajval Shetty) is a Mumbai-based Indian actor and director. He has acted in the Kannada films Yuva and Karthik. He directed the Marathi film Bhakti Heech Khari Shakti and Than Than Gopal

== Personal life ==
Kartik Shetty was born in Mumbai on 4 July 1987. His father, Vijay B. Shetty, is from Udupi. His mother, Sulatha V. Shetty is from Karkala. He did his early education from DonBosco school Matunga Mumbai and Jai Hind college, Digital Academy-The Film school Mumbai. He learned mixed martial arts and Mua Thai in Singapore. He is also a polo player.

== Career ==
Kartik Shetty made his directorial debut in the Marathi film Bhakti Heech Khari Shakti in 2006 and began his acting career in the Kannada film Yuva in 2009, the Kannada film Karthik in 2011 and the Kannada film Agni Musti in 2012. At the age of 19 years, he became the first Mumbai-Kannadiga to venture into Marathi film production.

== Filmography ==
Year	Film	Actor	Director	Role	Language	Notes
2006	Bhakti Heech Khari Shakti		Yes		Marathi	
2008	Yuvah	Yes		Jeevan Prakash	Kannada	
2011	Karthik	Yes		Karthik	Kannada	
2012	Agni Musti	Yes			Kannada	
2014	Rainbow Colony	Yes	Yes		Hindi	
2014	Red	Yes			Kannada	
2014	Than Than Gopal		Yes		Marathi	
2015	Akshate	Yes			Kannada	
2018	Bale Pudar Deeka E Preethig	Yes			Tulu	
