= Itihaas (TV series) =

Indian television series

- Genre: Drama
- Created by: Nirmala Sood
- Developed by: Balaji Telefilms
- Screenplay by: Vinod Ranganath; Dialogues; B. R. Ishara
- Story by: Ekta Kapoor; Vinod Ranganath
- Directed by: Gogi Anand
- Creative director: Monisha Singh
- Starring: see below
- Theme music composer: Nawab Arzoo
- Composer: Lalit Sen
- Country of origin: India
- Original language: Hindi
- No. of seasons: 1
- No. of episodes: 488

Production
- Producers: Ekta Kapoor; Shobha Kapoor
- Production locations: Mumbai, Maharashtra, India
- Editors: Dharmesh Shah; Dheerendra Singh
- Camera setup: Single-camera
- Running time: 24 minutes
- Production company: Balaji Telefilms

Original release
- Network: DD National
- Release: 6 May 1996 – 17 September 1998

Itihaas is an Indian drama series created by Nirmala Sood and co-produced by Ekta Kapoor and Shobha Kapoor under their banner Balaji Telefilms. The series premiered in 1996 on DD National.

== Plot ==
Ambika is the princess of a royal family who seeks justice for her husband's death. The series revolves around two generations of the royal family and explores greed, dishonesty and murder that often accompany the lust for the throne. How Ambika succeeds in her crusade against all odds forms the crux of the story.

== Cast ==
- Joan David as Shivani / Rajkumari Ambika and Aliza
- Priya Tendulkar as Sunita, sister of Shivani
- Prabha Sinha as Sheetal, sister of Shivani
- Smita Bansal as Padmini: Shivani's daughter
- Poonam Narula as Mona, daughter of Sunita
- Ali Asgar as Mukul
- Arun Bali as Sheetal's husband
- Benjamin Gilani as Sunita's husband
- Savita Prabhune as Taiji
- Nandita Puri
- Atul Srivastava
- Lalit Tiwari
- Pratima Kazmi
- Shishir Sharma
- Anupam Shyam
- Vineet Kumar
- Anant Jog
- Atul Srivastav
- Rinku Karmarkar
- Gautam Chaturvedi
- Kiran Karmarkar
- Anil Chowdhary
- Narendra Jha
- Asha Bachani
- Baani Prasanna
- Charlie
- Dinesh Sahdeo
- Jayati Bhatia
- Kapil Konark
- Kenneth Desai
- Kanwar Jagdish
- Rajesh Tandon
- Manoj Pandey
- Meenakshi Gupta
- Meenakshi Verma
- Nirmal Bhavnani
- Prashant Bhatt
- Pramod Kapoor
- Pradeep Nishit
- Seema Kapoor as Rohan's Wife (1997)
- Pinky Kapoor
- Rinku Dhawan
- Akhil Ghai
- Manoj Pandey
- Narendra Gupta
- Anita Kulkarni
