= Ragesh Asthana =

Indian actor (1962–2014)

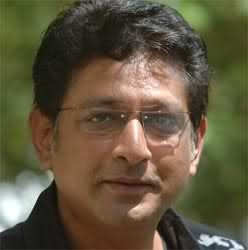
- Born: 17 May 1962; Uganda
- Died: 20 March 2014 (aged 51); Mumbai, India
- Occupation: Actor
- Spouse: Jyoti Asthana
- Children: 2

Ragesh Asthana (17 May 1962 – 20 March 2014) was an Indian actor who acted in several Hindi television serials such as Agle Janam Mohe Bitiya Hi Kijo and Palampur Express, Katputli and was last seen in Gumraah on Channel V.

== Early and personal life ==
Ragesh was born on 17 May 1962 in Uganda. He married Jyothi in 1994 and had two children Nanaki and Yuvaraj.

== Career ==
=== Early life ===
Ragesh debuted as an actor in 1987 in the serial Subah, directed by Bharat Rungachary, where he played the character of "Appu Swami". Ragesh had initially auditioned for the role of another character "Prem", but was rejected. He then tried for the next best role available and during the audition enacted a soliloquy from one of the plays that he had earlier acted in, which helped him bag the role of "Appu Swami". He also featured in a Doordarshan serial called Inkaar, which had an anti-drugs social message. He played the role of the protagonist's best friend, who helped him to come back to normal life after the latter gave up drug addiction.

=== Television and films ===
After the success of Subah, Ragesh was offered similar roles to the character he played in Subah, which caused him to reject such roles. During this time, he played small roles in episodic stories like Discovery of India by Shyam Benegal and Adhikar by Manju Sinha. After a long gap, he received the role of the rebellious Nikhil Singhani in the television series Parivartan (1993), which was telecast on Zee TV.

His work in television includes Andaaz, by Himesh Reshammiya, Shatranj, produced by Raman Kumar, Marshall, Waqt ki Raftaar and Khamoshi, by Gautam Adhikari.

Apart from television, Ragesh has also worked in some films such as Taxi No. 9211, Black Friday, Rakta Charitra 2, Jaal: The Trap, Chhal, Dharini and a few others.

== Filmography ==
=== Films ===
- Prahaar: The Final Attack (1991)
- Radha Ka Sangam (1992)
- Waqt Hamara Hai (1993)
- Divya Shakti (1993)...Sunil Gupta only Photo in photo frame (uncredited)
- Chhal (2002) - Inspector Patil
- Jaal: The Trap (2003) - Ajay's brother-in-law
- Black Friday (2004) - Mohammad Dossa
- Taxi No. 9211: Nau Do Gyarah (2006) - Car owner
- 340 (2009) - Store Keeper
- Rakta Charitra II (2010) - Jailor
- Shabri (2011) - Shardool Seth
- The Victim - Lawyer
- I Don't Luv U (2013)

=== Television ===
- Gumrah: End of Innocence (2012)
- Palampur Express (2009) - Ravikant Dixit
- Agle Janam Mohe Bitiya Hi Kijo (2009–11)
- Katputli
- Equador (TV miniseries) (2009) - Joghind
- Shatranj
- Marshall
- Andaz
- Dharini (2002)
- Khamoshi
- Raja Aur Rancho (1999)
- Waqt ki Raftaar (1999)
- Bombay Blue (TV Mini-Series) (1997) - Cop 1
- Parivartan (1993) - Nikhil Singhani
- Aahat Season 1(1995–2001) Episode 36,37 The Wish/ Episode96,97 Trespasser/Episode 130,131 Kirdaar/Episode 212,213 Tohfa/Episode 214,215 The Last wish
- Zee Horror Show (TV Series) (1994 – 95)
- Subah (TV Series) (1987)

== Death ==
Ragesh Asthana died on 20 March 2014 in Mumbai due to a heart attack.
