= Pratima Kazmi =

Indian television actress (born 1939)

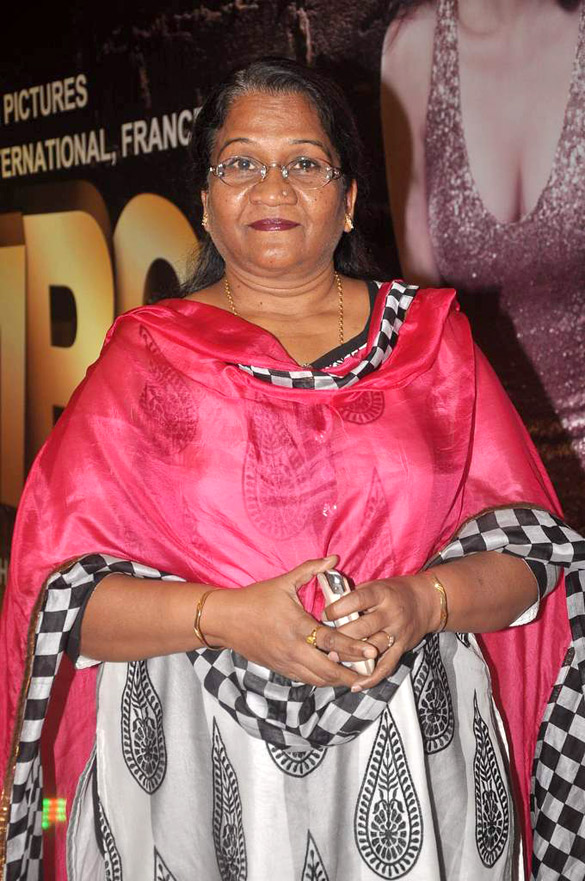
- Born: India
- Occupation: Actress
- Years active: 1989 – present
- Spouse: Kannan Arunachalam

Pratima Kazmi (also known as Pratima Kannan) is an Indian television actress who has worked in many Bollywood movies and Hindi television drama series. She started her career in 1997 with an English film called Sixth Happiness.

== Filmography ==
=== Television ===
- Itihaas as Khabri
- X Zone (1998)
- Saat Phere as Kalika's aunt
- Uttaran as Sumitra Devi / Nani Puskar's mother Rohini's mother-in-law Aunt Divya Tapasya's grandmother Mukta's great-grandmother Manav's great-grandmother is Mukta's daughter (2008–2015)
- Jabb Love Hua as Raghu's grandmother (2006–2007)
- Kammal as Rama
- Kya Haadsa Kya Haqeeqat as Bharini in Kaboo
- Kesar as Abhi's mother
- Mann Kee Awaaz Pratigya as Guruma
- Mere Angne Mein as Bua Dadi
- Ishq Ka Rang Safed as Indrani (2015–2016)
- Siya Ke Ram as Kaikesi
- Humko Tumse Ho Gaya Hai Pyaar Kya Karein as Dharamveer's elder sister (2016)
- Kaala Teeka as Maai (2017)
- Udaan as Rajeshwari Devi (2018)
- Bitti Business Wali (2018)
- Phir Laut Aayi Naagin as Anand's elder sister Mohini (2019)
- Bhabiji Ghar Par Hain! as Helen Mishra Vibhuti's mother (2020)
- Nath Zewar Ka Zanjeer (2021–2024)

=== Films ===
- Vardi (1989) dancer in the song "Maine Kitne Dil Liye"
- Fiza (2000) dancer in the song "Mehboob Mere"
- Sixth Happiness (1997)
- Dushman (1998)
- Such a Long Journey (1998)
- Godmother (1999)
- Shool (1999)
- Fiza (2000)
- Dil Pe Mat Le Yaar!! (2000)
- Gadar: Ek Prem Katha (2001)
- Raaz (2002)
- Pinjar (2003)
- Yeh Dil (2003)
- Market (2003)
- Waisa Bhi Hota Hai Part II (2003)
- Ek Hasina Thi (2004)
- Jaago (2004)
- Black Friday (2004)
- Sehar (2005)
- Mumbai Xpress (2005)
- Bunty Aur Babli (2005)
- Ssukh (2005)
- Film Star (2005)
- No Entry (2005)
- Undertrial (2007)
- Buddha Mar Gaya (2007)
- Bhopal Mail (2010)
- Badlapur (2015)
- Hai Golmaal in White House (2015)
- Dabangg 3 (2019)
- Merry Christmas (2024)
