= Harsh Khurana =

Indian film & television actor

- Occupation: Actor
- Years active: 1997–present

Harsh Khurana is an Indian film and television actor.

== Television ==
Year	Series	Role
1997–2002	Amanat	Rohan
1997–1999	Saturday Suspense	Various Episodes
2000	Yeh Nazdeekiyan	Manav
2000–2004	Sonpari	Deepak
2001	Kutumb	Manav
2003	Kise Apna Kahein	Arshad
2003–Present	Crime Patrol	Various characters
2010–2011	Ring Wrong Ring	Raj
2011–2012	Chintu Chinki Aur Ek Badi Si Love Story	Chintu's Fufaji (Chintu's Uncle)
2012–2014	Jeannie Aur Juju	Vela
2014	Tu Mere Agal Bagal Hai	Producer
2014–2016	Neeli Chhatri Wale	
2015	Peterson Hill	Rahul Cheater/ Chor
2015–2016	Chalti Ka Naam Gaadi...Let's Go	Prem Chopra

== Films ==
- 88 Antop Hill (2003) as Aslam Durrani
- The Legend of Bhagat Singh (2002) as Jai Gopal
- Chal Man Jeetva Jaiye as Niranjan Sanghvi
