= Shakti Singh (actor) =

Indian television actor

- Born: 9 October 1955 (age 71)
- Occupations: Actor, voice actor
- Years active: 1986–present
- Spouse: Janhavi Singh
- Children: 2

Shakti Singh (born 9 October 1955) is an Indian television and voice actor specializing in dubbing foreign films, mostly Hollywood films, in Hindi. He also works in dubbing for Hindi films.

== Filmography ==
=== Live action films ===
Year	Film title	Role	Language	Notes
2006	Rafta Rafta – The Speed	Harish	Hindi	
2018	Shinaakht	Prosecutor	Hindi	Short film

=== Television shows ===
Program title	Airdate	Role	Channel	Language	Notes
Nukkad	1986–1988	Suresh	DD National	Hindi	
Byomkesh Bakshi	1993, 1997	Inspector, Inspector Sanyal, and Inspector Ramani Sanyal	DD National	Hindi	3 episodes
Naya Nukkad	1993–1994	Suresh	DD National	Hindi	Sequel series of Nukkad
Chahat Aur Nafrat	1997–1999		Zee TV	Hindi	Negative Role
Muskaan	1999	Sameer's Father	Zee TV	Hindi	negative role
Kyunki Saas Bhi Kabhi Bahu Thi	2000–2004	Mansukh Virani	Star Plus	Hindi	
Kashmakash Zindagi Ki	2006-2009	Vikram Malhotra	DD National	Hindi	Supporting role
Crime Patrol	2011–present	Various characters	Sony TV	Hindi	
Savdhaan India	2012–Present	Subhedar Ratan Singh, Retd Army Officer (Episode 1122) / Mohan Sawant, Retd Police Officer (Episode 1919) / Ravi (Episode 1494)	Star Bharat	Hindi	
Sapne Suhane Ladakpan Ke	2012–2015	Dayal Garg	Zee TV	Hindi	
Siya Ke Ram	2015–2016	Valmiki	Star Plus	Hindi	
Thapki Pyar Ki	2015–2016	Krishnakant Chaturvedi	Colors TV	Hindi	
Agnifera	2017–2018	Purushottam Singh	&TV	Hindi	
Roop - Mard Ka Naya Swaroop	2018–2019	Haren Patel	Colors TV	Hindi	
Sasural Simar Ka 2	2021–2023	Avinash Narayan	Colors TV	Hindi	
Suhaagan	2023–2024	Baldev Shukla	Colors TV	Hindi	
Sajan Ji Ghar Aaye Family Kyun Sharmaye	2025	Mahesh Lal	Dangal TV	Hindi	

== Dubbing career ==
He has dubbed several actors such as Anthony Hopkins and Mel Gibson for English-language films.

=== Animated films and series ===
Year	Film title	Role	Language	Notes
1992	Ramayana: The Legend of Prince Rama	Lakshmana	Hindi	An Indo-Japanese animated film.
2008	Ghatothkach	Balram	Hindi	An Indian animated film.
2009	Little Krishna: The Animated Series and its film trilogy	Nanda Maharaja, village chief of Vrindavana / Vishnu (cameo appearance)	Hindi	An English-Hindi bilingual animated series and trilogy. He briefly dubbed Vishnu for some specific reasons.
2021–2024	The Legend of Hanuman	Jambavana	Hindi	Indian animated series created by Sharad Devarajan, Jeevan J. Kang and Charuvi Agrawal for Disney+ Hotstar.

== Dubbing roles ==
=== Live action television series ===
Program title	Actor	Character	Dub language	Original language	Episodes	Original airdate	Dubbed airdate	Notes
House of Cards	Kevin Spacey	Francis "Frank" Underwood	Hindi	English		2013–Present		
Outer Range	Josh Brolin	Royal Abbott	Hindi	English		2022–present		

=== Live action films ===
==== Indian films ====
Film title	Actor	Character	Dub language	Original language	Original year release	Dub year release	Notes
Yoddha	Mohanlal	Tharambil Ashokan/Akkasto	Hindi	Malyalam	1992	1997	Hindi titled "Dharam Yodha
Pratibandh	Chiranjeevi	Inspector Siddhanth	Hindi	Hindi	1990		
The Gentleman	Chiranjeevi	Vijay	Hindi	Hindi	1994		
Criminal	Nassar	SP Teja	Hindi	Hindi	1994		
Jai Hind	Arjun Sarja	ACP Bharath	Hindi	Tamil	1994	1995	The Hindi dub was titled: Jai Bharat.
Angrakshak	Nassar	Unknown	Hindi	Hindi	1995		
Aur Ek Prem Kahani	Ramesh Aravind		Hindi	Hindi	1996		
Little John	Nassar	Inspector Vijay	Hindi	Hindi	2001		
Rakht Charitra	Kitty	Nalla Narasimha Reddy	Hindi	Hindi	2010		
Roja	Arvind Swamy	Sridhar	Hindi	Tamil	1992	1992	
Roja	Nassar	Colonel Rayappa	Hindi	Tamil	1992	1992	
Kaadhalan	Prabhu Deva	Prabhu	Hindi	Tamil	1994	1995	The Hindi dub was titled: Humse Hai Muqabala.
Kaadhalan	Girish Karnad	Minister Kakarla Sathyanarayana (Raja Ranjit Singh in Hindi version)	Hindi	Tamil	1994	1995	The Hindi dub was titled: Humse Hai Muqabala.
Bombay	Arvind Swamy	Shekhar Narayanan Pillai	Hindi	Tamil	1995	1995	
Indian	Nedumudi Venu	Krishnaswamy	Hindi	Tamil	1996		The Hindi dub was titled: Hindustani.
Jeans	Nassar	Nachiappan and Pechiappan (twins)	Hindi	Tamil	1998	1998	
Devi	Abu Salim	Dantra	Hindi	Telugu	1999	2000	
Raja Kumarudu	Prakash Raj	Dhanunjay (Dhanraj in Hindi version)	Hindi	Telugu	1999	1999	The Hindi dub was titled: Prince No. 1.
Aavida Maa Aavide	Nagarjuna	C.I. Vikranth	Hindi	Telugu	1998	2000	The Hindi dub was titled: Biwi No. 2.
Devi Putrudu	Venkatesh	Balaram & Krishna (Dual role)	Hindi	Telugu	2002	2002	The Hindi dub was titled: Aaj Ka Deviputra.
Indra	Chiranjeevi	Indra Sena Reddy(Indrasen Kumar Singh in Hindi version) / Shankar Narayana	Hindi	Telugu	2002	2003	The Hindi dub was titled: Indra: The Tiger.
Andarivaadu	Chiranjeevi	Govindarajulu a.k.a. Govinda / Siddharth a.k.a. Siddu	Hindi	Telugu	2005	2006	The Hindi dub was titled: Ek Aur Himmatwala.
Lakshmi	Sayaji Shinde	Janardan	Hindi	Telugu	2006	2007	The Hindi dub was titled: Meri Taaqat.
Mahatma	Jaya Prakash Reddy †	M.L.A.	Hindi	Telugu	2009	2009	The Hindi dub was titled: Ek Aur Mahanayak.
Arya 2	Sayaji Shinde	Raja Reddy	Hindi	Telugu	2009	2010	The Hindi dub was titled: Arya: Ek Deewana.
Vandae Maatharam	Mammootty	Gopikrishnan IPS (Deputy director IB)	Hindi	Tamil	2010	Unknown	The Hindi dub was titled: Mission Vande Mataram.
Nagavalli	Venkatesh	Dr. Vijay / King Nagabhairav Rajshekhar	Hindi	Telugu	2010	2011	The Hindi dub was titled: Mera Badla: Revenge.
Aadhavan	Sayaji Shinde	Ibrahim Rowthar	Hindi	Tamil	2009	2011	The Hindi dub was titled: Dildaar: The Arya.
Jalsa	Prakash Raj	Indu's and Bhagyamati's father	Hindi	Telugu	2008	2012	The Hindi dub was titled: Yeh Hai Jalsa.
Brindavanam	Srihari †	Shiva Prasad alias Shivudu	Hindi	Telugu	2010	2012	The Hindi dub was titled: The Super Khiladi.
Dookudu	Nassar	Murthy	Hindi	Telugu	2011	2012	The Hindi dub was titled: The Real Tiger.
Singam	Prakash Raj	Mayil Vaaganam (Shankar Seth in Hindi version)	Hindi	Tamil	2010	2012	The Hindi dub was titled: The Fighterman Singam.
Sakthi	Mukhtar Khan	Faqtooni's brother	Hindi	Telugu	2011	2012	The Hindi dub was titled: Ek Tha Soldier.
Oosaravelli	Prakash Raj	Ajju Bhai	Hindi	Telugu	2011	2012	The Hindi dub was titled: Mar Mitenge.
Annayya	Chiranjeevi	Rajaram	Hindi	Telugu	2000	2012	The Hindi dub was titled: Khoon Ka Rishta.
Bodyguard	Prakash Raj	Varadarajula Naidu	Hindi	Telugu	2012	2012	The Hindi dub was titled: Karz Chukana Hai.
Khatarnak	Biju Menon	Lawyer	Hindi	Telugu	2006	2012	The Hindi dub was titled: Main Hoon Khatarnak.
Kandahar	Mohanlal	Major Mahadevan, NSG	Hindi	Malayalam	2010	2012	The Hindi dub was titled: War on Terror - Kandahar.
Athadu	Prakash Raj	CBI officer Anjaneya Prasad (Arjun Prasad in Hindi version)	Hindi	Telugu	2005	2013	The Hindi dub was titled: Cheetah: The Power Of One.
Baadshah	Ashish Vidyarthi	Crazy Robert (Yeda Robert in Hindi version)	Hindi	Telugu	2013	2013	The Hindi dub was titled: Rowdy Baadshah.
Singam II	Mukesh Rishi	Bhai	Hindi	Tamil	2013	2013	The Hindi dub was titled: Main Hoon Surya Singham II.
Singam II	Nassar	Mr. Mahalingam	Hindi	Tamil	2013	2013	The Hindi dub was titled: Main Hoon Surya Singham II.
Magadheera	Srihari †	Sher Khan / Solomon	Hindi	Telugu	2009	2013	
Magadheera	Chiranjeevi	Cameo appearance	Hindi	Telugu	2009	2013	
Broker	Srihari †	Dharma Teja	Hindi	Telugu	2010	2013	The Hindi dub was titled: Jugadu No. 1.
Dhammu	Suman Talwar	Sri Raja Vasi Reddy	Hindi	Telugu	2012	2013	
Dhee	Srihari †	Shankar Gowd	Hindi	Telugu	2007	2013	The Hindi dub was titled: Sabse Badi Hera Pheri.
Businessman	Nassar	Ajay Bhardwaj	Hindi	Telugu	2012	2013	The Hindi dub was titled: No. 1 Businessman.
Rebel	Krishnam Raju †	Bhupathi (Janardhan in Hindi version)	Hindi	Telugu	2012	2014	The Hindi dub was titled: The Return Of Rebel.
Vettaikaaran	Srihari †	Devaraj IPS	Hindi	Tamil	2009	2014	The Hindi dub was titled: Dangerous Khiladi 3.
Muni 2: Kanchana	Devan	MLA Shankar	Hindi	Tamil	2011	2014	The Hindi dub was titled: Kanchana.
Vastadu Naa Raju	Prakash Raj	Narasimha	Hindi	Telugu	2011	2014	The Hindi dub was titled: Dare Devil.
Happy	Deepak Shirke	Madhumati (Madhu in Hindi version)'s father	Hindi	Telugu	2006	2015	The Hindi dub was titled: Dum.
Rudhramadevi	Prakash Raj	Shiva Devaiah	Hindi	Telugu	2015	2015	
Denikaina Ready	Suman Talwar	Basha	Hindi	Telugu	2012	2015	The Hindi dub was titled: Sabse Badi Hera Pheri 2.
Thiruvilaiyaadal Aarambam	Prakash Raj	Guru	Hindi	Tamil	2006	2015	The Hindi dub was titled: Super Khiladi Returns.
Ramanaa	Vijayakanth †	Ramana (Ramlal in Hindi version)	Hindi	Tamil	2002	2015	The Hindi dub was titled: Mar Mitenge 3.
Thirumalai	Manoj K. Jayan	Arasu (Yamraaj in Hindi version)	Hindi	Tamil	2003	2015	The Hindi dub was titled: Dum 2.
Chandee	Ashish Vidyarthi	Minister	Hindi	Telugu	2013	2015	The Hindi dub was titled: Chandi: The Power Of Woman.
Seethamma Vakitlo Sirimalle Chettu	Prakash Raj	Relangi Mavayya (Relangi Uncle) (Prakash Chacha in Hindi version)	Hindi	Telugu	2013	2015	The Hindi dub was titled: Sabse Badhkar Hum 2.
Srimannarayana	Suresh	Harshad	Hindi	Telugu	2012	2015	The Hindi dub was titled: The Return of Lion.
Cameraman Gangatho Rambabu	Prakash Raj	Rana Prathap Naidu	Hindi	Telugu	2012	2016	The Hindi dub was titled: Mera Target.
Pattathu Yaanai	John Vijay	Daya	Hindi	Tamil	2013	2016	The Hindi dub was titled: Daringbaaz Khiladi.
Saguni	Prakash Raj	Bhupathy	Hindi	Tamil	2012	2016	The Hindi dub was titled: Rowdy Leader.
Yennai Arindhaal	Ashish Vidyarthi	Golden Raj	Hindi	Tamil	2015	2016	The Hindi dub was titled: Satyadev: The Fearless Cop.
Son of Satyamurthy	Prakash Raj	Satyamurthy	Hindi	Telugu	2015	2016	
Paayum Puli	Jayaprakash	Lakshmi Narayan	Hindi	Tamil	2015	2016	The Hindi dub was titled: Main Hoon Rakshak.
Heart Attack	Prakash Raj	Himself in a special appearance	Hindi	Telugu	2014	2016	
Endukante... Premanta!	Suman Talwar	Sravanthi (Sharmila in Hindi version)'s father	Hindi	Telugu	2015	2016	The Hindi dub was titled: Dangerous Khiladi 5.
Temper	Prakash Raj	Valtair Vasu	Hindi	Telugu	2015	2016	
Jil	Kabir Duhan Singh	Chota Nayak	Hindi	Telugu	2015	2016	
Govindudu Andarivadele	Prakash Raj	Balaraju (Balaraj Singh in Hindi version)	Hindi	Telugu	2014	2016	The Hindi dub was titled: Yevadu 2.
Yaan	Jayaprakash	Anwar Ali	Hindi	Tamil	2014	2016	The Hindi dub was titled: Jaan Ki Baazi.
Srimanthudu	Jagapathi Babu	Ravikanth	Hindi	Telugu	2015	2016	The Hindi dub was titled: The Real Tevar.
Mirattal	Prabhu Ganesan	Shankar Dhadha	Hindi	Tamil	2012	2016	The Hindi dub was titled: Daringbaaz Aashiq 2.
Shivalinga	Jayaprakash	Mr. Viswanathan	Hindi	Tamil	2017	2017	The Hindi dub was titled: Kanchana Returns.
Soggade Chinni Nayana	Nassar	Rudraraju	Hindi	Telugu	2016	2017	The Hindi dub was titled: The Return of Raju.
Jaggu Dada	Rajat Bedi	Mumbai Don Subhash Bhai	Hindi	Kannada	2016	2017	The Hindi dub was titled: Khatarnak Khiladi 3.
Sarrainodu	Jayaprakash	Umapathi	Hindi	Telugu	2016	2017	
Billa	Krishnam Raju †	ACP Krishnamoorthy	Hindi	Telugu	2009	2017	The Hindi dub was titled: The Return Of Rebel 2.
Geethaanjali	Mohanlal	Dr. Sunny Joseph (Sunny Pathak in Hindi version)	Hindi	Malayalam	2013	2017	
Janatha Garage	Mohanlal	Sathyam	Hindi	Telugu	2016	2017	The Hindi dub was titled: Janta Garage.
Velaiilla Pattadhari 2	M. J. Shriram	Ramkumar	Hindi	Tamil	2017	2017	The Hindi dub was titled: VIP-2 Lalkar.
Thani Oruvan	Nassar	Chief Minister	Hindi	Tamil	2016	2017	The Hindi dub was titled: Double Attack 2.
Speedunnodu	Prakash Raj	Veerabhadrappa	Hindi	Telugu	2016	2017	
Dynamite	Nagineedu	S.I. Swaminath	Hindi	Telugu	2015	2017	
Duvvada Jagannadham	Chandra Mohan	DJ's uncle	Hindi	Telugu	2017	2017	The Hindi dub was titled: DJ.
Doosukeltha	Nagineedu	Alekhya (Alia in Hindi version)'s grandfather	Hindi	Telugu	2013	2017	The Hindi dub was titled: Dangerous Khiladi 6.
Pandavulu Pandavulu Tummeda	Mohan Babu	Naidu / Graha Raju (Graha Raja in Hindi version)	Hindi	Telugu	2014	2017	The Hindi dub was titled: Sabse Badi Hera Pheri 3.
Soukhyam	Devan	PR	Hindi	Telugu	2015	2017	The Hindi dub was titled: Mard Ki Zaban 2.
Saagasam	Rao Ramesh	Inspector Rajamanickam	Hindi	Tamil	2016	2017	The Hindi dub was titled: Jeene Nahi Doonga 2.
Khaidi No. 150	Chiranjeevi	Kaththi Seenu / Konidela Siva Shankar Vara Prasad (Dual role)	Hindi	Telugu	2017	2017	
Dhilluku Dhuddu	Narrator	Narrator	Hindi	Tamil	2016	2017	The Hindi dub was titled: Raj Mahal 3.
Terror	Vinay Varma	DCP V. Rathod	Hindi	Telugu	2016	2017	
Pulimurugan	Mohanlal	Murugan	Hindi	Malayalam	2016	2018	The Hindi dub was titled: Sher Ka Shikaar.
Nenu Local	Rao Ramesh	Bride's father	Hindi	Telugu	2017	2018	The Hindi dub was titled: Super Khiladi 4.
Gopala Gopala	Ranganath †	Judge	Hindi	Telugu	2015	2018	
Goutham Nanda	Mukesh Rishi	Mudra	Hindi	Telugu	2017	2018	The Hindi dub was titled: Rowdy Rajkumar 2.
Luckunnodu	Jayaprakash	Bhakthavatsalam (Bhagat Varma in Hindi version)	Hindi	Telugu	2017	2018	The Hindi dub was titled: Sabse Bada Zero.
All in All Azhagu Raja	Prabhu	Muthukrishnan	Hindi	Tamil	2013	2018	The Hindi dub was titled: Hero No. Zero 2.
Eedo Rakam Aado Rakam	Rajendra Prasad	Advocate Narayana	Hindi	Telugu	2016	2018	The Hindi dub was titled: Hyper.
Ko	Prakash Raj	Yogeswaran (Yograj Makrand in Hindi version)	Hindi	Tamil	2011	2018	The Hindi dub was titled: The Real Leader.
Jai Lava Kusa	P. Sai Kumar	Kaka	Hindi	Telugu	2017	2018	The Hindi dub was titled: The Power Of 3: Jai Luv Kush.
Hebbuli	Narrator	Narrator	Hindi	Kannada	2017	2018	
Hebbuli	Ravi Kale	Chief Officer Murali Menon	Hindi	Kannada	2017	2018	
Hello	Jagapathi Babu	Prakash	Hindi	Telugu	2017	2018	The Hindi dub was titled: Taqdeer.
Vikram Vedha	Achyuth Kumar	Surendhar	Hindi	Tamil	2017	2018	
Jaya Janaki Nayaka	R. Sarathkumar	Chakravarthy	Hindi	Telugu	2017	2018	The Hindi dub was titled: Jaya Janaki Nayaka - Khoonkhar.
Jawaan	Jayaprakash	Jai's father	Hindi	Telugu	2017	2018	
Villain	Mohanlal	ADGP Mathew Manjooran IPS	Hindi	Malayalam	2017	2018	The Hindi dub was titled: Kaun Hai Villain.
Chanti	Narrator	Narrator	Hindi	Telugu	2004	2018	The Hindi dub was titled: Main Insaaf Karoonga 2.
Chanti	Narra Venkateswara Rao †	MLA's father-in-law	Hindi	Telugu	2004	2018	The Hindi dub was titled: Main Insaaf Karoonga 2.
Saithan	Kitty	Psychiatrist	Hindi	Tamil	2016	2018	The Hindi dub was titled: Shaitan.
Sketch	Aruldoss	Dorai (Rajan in Hindi version)	Hindi	Tamil	2018	2018	
Vanamagan	Prakash Raj	Rajashekar	Hindi	Tamil	2017	2018	The Hindi dub was titled: Tarzan - The Heman.
Gunde Jaari Gallanthayyinde	Ahuti Prasad †	Shravani's father	Hindi	Telugu	2013	2018	The Hindi dub was titled: Heart Attack 2.
Yuddham Sharanam	Rao Ramesh	Murali Krishna	Hindi	Telugu	2017	2018	
Agnyaathavaasi	Jayaprakash	Aditya's brother	Hindi	Telugu	2018	2018	The Hindi dub was titled: Yevadu 3.
Bhaagamathie	Jayaram	Eashwar Prasad	Hindi	Telugu	2018	2018	
Remo	K. S. Ravikumar	himself	Hindi	Tamil	2016	2018	
Bharat Ane Nenu	Prakash Raj	Varadarajulu	Hindi	Telugu	2018	2018	The Hindi dub was titled: Dashing CM Bharath.
Velaikkaran	Prakash Raj	Kasi Annan	Hindi	Tamil	2017	2019	The Hindi dub was titled: Ghayal Khiladi.
Nela Ticket	Sarath Babu	Ananda Bhupathi	Hindi	Telugu	2018	2019	
Lucifer	Mohanlal	Stephen Nedumpally / Khureshi Ab'raam	Hindi	Malayalam	2019	2019	
Jersey	Jayaprakash	BCCI Chairman	Hindi	Telugu	2019	2019	
Mamangam	Mammootty	Chandroth Valiya Panicker / Kurup	Hindi	Malayalam	2019	2019	
Kanthaswamy	Prabhu	Parandhaman IPS	Hindi	Tamil	2009	2019	The Hindi dub was titled: Temper 2.
Chitralahari	Jayaprakash	CEO	Hindi	Telugu	2019	2019	The Hindi dub was titled: Premam.
Amar Akbar Anthony	Subhalekha Sudhakar	Dr. Marc Anthony	Hindi	Telugu	2018	2019	The Hindi dub was titled: Amar Akhbar Anthoni.
Avane Srimannarayana	Raghu Ramanakoppa	Harishchandra, a treasure hunter	Hindi	Kannada	2019	2019	The Hindi dub was titled: Adventures of Srimannarayana.
Saravana	Prakash Raj	Soundarapandiyan	Hindi	Tamil	2006	2020	The Hindi dub was titled: Dangerous Khiladi 7.
Mr. Majnu	Jayaprakash	Krishna Prasad	Hindi	Telugu	2019	2020	
3	Jeeva Ravi	Janani's father	Hindi	Tamil	2012	2020	
Dwaraka	Prakash Raj	CM	Hindi	Telugu	2017	2020	
Marudhamalai	Nassar	Marudhamalai (Arjun in Hindi version)'s father	Hindi	Tamil	2007	2020	The Hindi dub was titled: Policewala Gunda 4.
K.G.F: Chapter 1	Anant Nag	Anand Ingalagi	Bhojpuri	Kannada	2018	2020	
Kedi Billa Killadi Ranga	Delhi Ganesh	Chidambaram	Hindi	Tamil	2013	2020	The Hindi dub was titled: Sabse Bada Zero 2.
Idhaya Thirudan	Prakash Raj	ACP Mayilravanan IPS (Manish Kumar in Hindi version)	Hindi	Tamil	2006	2020	The Hindi dub was titled: Mard Ki Zaban 3.
Vada Chennai	Ameer	Rajan	Hindi	Tamil	2018	2020	The Hindi dub was titled: Chennai Central.
Thamizhan	Ashish Vidyarthi	GK	Hindi	Tamil	2002	2021	The Hindi dub was titled: Jeet - Born To Win.
Odiyan	Mohanlal	Odiyan Manickyan	Hindi	Malayalam	2018	2021	
World Famous Lover	Jayaprakash	Murthy	Hindi	Telugu	2020	2021	
Asuran	Prakash Raj	Venugopal Seshadri	Hindi	Tamil	2019	2021	
Attack	Prakash Raj	Guru Raj	Hindi	Telugu	2016	2021	The Hindi dub was titled: Zulmi Sitamgar.
Yuvarathnaa	Prakash Raj	Gurudev Deshmukh	Hindi	Kannada	2021	2021	
Kaappaan	Mohanlal	Chandrakanth Varma	Hindi	Tamil	2019	2021	The Hindi dub was titled: Rowdy Rakshak.
Pokkiri	Prakash Raj	Ali Bhai (Second dub)	Hindi	Tamil	2007	2021	The Hindi dub was titled: Wanted Baghi.
Big Brother	Mohanlal	Sachidanandan / Sachi	Hindi	Malayalam	2020	2021	
Villu	Prakash Raj	J. D. (Second dub)	Hindi	Tamil	2009	2021	The Hindi dub was titled: Ek Aur Jaanbaaz Khiladi.
Miss India	Rajendra Prasad	Dr. Vishwanath	Hindi	Telugu	2020	2021	
V	Sathyasai Srinivas	DCP B. Satya Kumar	Hindi	Telugu	2020	2021	
Size Zero	Prakash Raj	'Size Zero' Satyanand	Hindi	Telugu	2015	2021	
Entha Manchivaadavuraa	Vijayakumar	Lakshminarayana	Hindi	Telugu	2020	2022	The Hindi dub was titled: Dumdaar Khiladi 2.
Godfather	Chiranjeevi	Brahma	Hindi	Telugu	2022	2022	
Waltair Veerayya	Chiranjeevi	Waltair Veerayya	Hindi	Telugu	2023	2023	
Chengiz	Shataf Figar	Omar	Hindi	Bengali	2023	2023	

==== Foreign language films ====
Film title	Actor	Character	Dub language	Original language	Original year release	Dub year release	Notes
Vertigo	James Stewart	John "Scottie" Ferguson	Hindi	English	1958	2020	
The Evil Dead	Bruce Campbell	Ash Williams	Hindi	English	1981	Unknown	
Never Say Never Again	Sean Connery †	James Bond	Hindi	English	1983	Unknown	
Scarface	Robert Loggia	Frank Lopez	Hindi	English	1983	1990	
The Untouchables	Robert De Niro	Al Capone	Hindi	English	1987	1988	
Jurassic Park	Jeff Goldblum	Ian Malcolm	Hindi	English	1993	1994	Released in theaters dubbed in Hindi on 15 April 1994 in India.
Braveheart	Mel Gibson	William Wallace	Hindi	English	1995	1995	
GoldenEye	Pierce Brosnan	James Bond	Hindi	English	1995	Unknown	
Mission: Impossible	Emilio Estevez	Jack Harmon	Hindi	English	1996	Unknown	
The Phantom	James Remar	Quill	Hindi	English	1996	1996	
Home Alone 3	Kevin Kilner	Jack Pruitt	Hindi	English	1997	Unknown	
Titanic	Billy Zane	Caledon Nathan "Cal" Hockley	Hindi	English	1997	1998	
Men in Black	Tommy Lee Jones	Kevin Brown / Agent K	Hindi	English	1997	1997	
Men in Black II	Tommy Lee Jones	Kevin Brown / Agent K	Hindi	English	2002	2002	
Men in Black 3	Tommy Lee Jones	Kevin Brown / Agent K	Hindi	English	2012	2012	
Stuart Little	Hugh Laurie	Mr. Frederick Little	Hindi	English	1999	2000	
The Sixth Sense	Bruce Willis	Dr. Malcolm Crowe	Hindi	English	1999	2005	Dubbed for television broadcasting on UTV.
The Matrix	Hugo Weaving	Agent Smith	Hindi	English	1999	1999	
The Matrix Reloaded	Hugo Weaving	Agent Smith	Hindi	English	2003	2003	
The Matrix Revolutions	Hugo Weaving	Agent Smith	Hindi	English	2003	2003	
The Mummy	Brendan Fraser	Rick O'Connell	Hindi	English; Arabic; Ancient Egyptian	1999	1999	
The Mummy Returns	Brendan Fraser	Rick O'Connell	Hindi	English; Arabic	2001	2001	
The Mummy: Tomb of the Dragon Emperor	Brendan Fraser	Rick O' Connell	Hindi	English; Mandarin Chinese; Sanskrit	2008	2008	
The Bone Collector	John Benjamin Hickey	Doctor Barry Lehman	Hindi	English	1999	2010	
Gladiator	Joaquin Phoenix	Commodus	Hindi	English	2000	2000	
The 6th Day	Tony Goldwyn	Michael Drucker	Hindi	English	2000	2000	
Rush Hour 2	John Lone	Ricky Tan	Hindi	English; Mandarin Chinese; Cantonese Chinese	2001	2001	
Black Hawk Down	Jason Isaacs	Captain Steele	Hindi	English	2001	2001	
Swordfish	John Travolta	Gabriel Shear	Hindi	English	2001	2001	
XXX	Samuel L. Jackson	Augustus Gibbons	Hindi	English; German; Spanish; Russian; Czech	2002	2002	
XXX: State of the Union	Samuel L. Jackson	Augustus Gibbons	Hindi	English	2005	2005	
Spider-Man	Willem Dafoe	Norman Osborn / Green Goblin	Hindi	English	2002	2002	
Spider-Man 2	Alfred Molina	Dr. Otto Octavius / Doctor Octopus	Hindi	English	2004	2004	
Pirates of the Caribbean: The Curse of the Black Pearl	Geoffrey Rush	Captain Hector Barbossa	Hindi	English	2003	2003	
Pirates of the Caribbean: Dead Man's Chest	Bill Nighy	Davy Jones	Hindi	English	2006	2006	
Pirates of the Caribbean: At World's End	Bill Nighy	Davy Jones	Hindi	English	2007	2007	
X2	Hugh Jackman	Logan / Wolverine	Hindi	English	2003	2003	
X-Men: The Last Stand	Hugh Jackman	Logan / Wolverine	Hindi	English	2006	2006	
X-Men Origins: Wolverine	Hugh Jackman	Logan / Wolverine	Hindi	English	2009	2009	
X-Men: First Class	Oliver Platt	CIA Agent	Hindi	English	2011	2011	
Night at the Museum: Battle of the Smithsonian	Steve Coogan	Octavius	Hindi	English	2009	2009	
Underworld	Shane Brolly	Kraven	Hindi	English	2003	2003	
The Day After Tomorrow	Dennis Quaid	Professor Jack Hall	Hindi	English	2004	2004	
King Kong	Thomas Kretschmann	Captain Englehorn	Hindi	English	2005	2005	
Casino Royale	Daniel Craig	James Bond	Hindi	English	2006	2006	
Quantum of Solace	Daniel Craig	James Bond	Hindi	English	2008	2008	
Skyfall	Daniel Craig	James Bond	Hindi	English	2012	2012	Singh's name was mentioned on the Hindi dub credits of the DVD release of the film, also containing the Tamil, Telugu, Russian and Ukrainian credits.
Spectre	Daniel Craig	James Bond	Hindi	English	2015	2015	
Next	Nicolas Cage	Cris Johnson	Hindi	English	2007	2007	
Shoot 'Em Up	Paul Giamatti	Karl Hertz	Hindi	English	2007	2007	
The Taking of Pelham 123	Denzel Washington	Walter Garber	Hindi	English	2009	2009	
Race to Witch Mountain	Ciarán Hinds	Henry Burke	Hindi	English	2009	2009	The Hindi dub was re-titled as: "Resa Tisari Duniya Taka", which translates to: "Race to Third World". After the original ending credits for the DVD release of the Hindi dub, Singh's name was mentioned on the Hindi dubbing credits, and it's also written in the Hindi language.
Twilight	Billy Burke	Charlie Swan	Hindi	English	2008	2008	
The Twilight Saga: New Moon	Billy Burke	Charlie Swan	Hindi	English	2009	2009	
The Twilight Saga: Eclipse	Billy Burke	Charlie Swan	Hindi	English	2010	2010	
The Twilight Saga: Breaking Dawn – Part 1	Billy Burke	Charlie Swan	Hindi	English	2011	2011	
The Twilight Saga: Breaking Dawn – Part 2	Billy Burke	Charlie Swan	Hindi	English	2012	2012	
The Wolfman	Anthony Hopkins	Sir John Talbot	Hindi	English	2010	2010	
The Expendables	Eric Roberts	James Munroe	Hindi	English	2010	2010	
Clash of the Titans	Liam Neeson	Zeus	Hindi	English	2010	2010	
Wrath of the Titans	Liam Neeson	Zeus	Hindi	English	2012	2012	
The Chronicles of Narnia: The Voyage of the Dawn Treader	Gary Sweet	Lord Drinian	Hindi	English	2010	2010	
Cowboys & Aliens	Daniel Craig	Jake Lonergan	Hindi	English	2011	2011	
The Adventures of Tintin	Andy Serkis	Captain Archibald Haddock and Sir Francis Haddock	Hindi	English	2011	2011	
Thor	Anthony Hopkins	Odin	Hindi	English	2011	2011	
Iron Man 2	Samuel L. Jackson	Nick Fury	Hindi	English	2010	2010	
The Avengers	Samuel L. Jackson	Nick Fury	Hindi	English	2012	2012	
John Carter	Willem Dafoe	Green Tarks's Emperor	Hindi	English	2012	2012	
The Mask of Zorro	Anthony Hopkins	Diego De La Vega	Hindi	English	1998	1998	
Thor: The Dark World	Anthony Hopkins	Odin	Hindi	English	2013	2013	
Man of Steel	Russell Crowe	Jor-El	Hindi	English	2013	2013	
The Wolverine	Hugh Jackman	Logan / Wolverine	Hindi	English	2013	2013	
Mission: Impossible III	Philip Seymour Hoffman	Owen Davian	Hindi	English	2006	2006	
102 Dalmatians	Gérard Depardieu	Jean Pierre Le Pelt	Hindi	English	2000	Unknown	
Captain America: The Winter Soldier	Samuel L. Jackson	Nick Fury	Hindi	English	2014	2014	
The Last Samurai	Ken Watanabe	Lord Moritsugu Katsumoto	Hindi	English	2003	2003	
Avengers: Age of Ultron	Samuel L. Jackson	Nick Fury	Hindi	English	2015	2015	
XXX: Return of Xander Cage	Samuel L. Jackson	Augustus Gibbons	Hindi	English	2017	2017	
Logan	Hugh Jackman	Logan / Wolverine	Hindi	English	2017	2017	
Charlie and the Chocolate Factory	Geoffrey Holder	Narrator	Hindi	English	2005	2005	
The Mask	Peter Greene	Dorian Tyrel (Goldy)	Hindi	English	1994		Released only for Home Media. Character's name was changed to Goldy for the Hindi dub.
Kingsman: The Secret Service	Samuel L. Jackson	Richmond Valentine	Hindi	English	2014	2014	
Thor: Ragnarok	Anthony Hopkins	Odin	Hindi	English	2017	2017	
Avengers: Infinity War	Samuel L. Jackson	Nick Fury (uncredited cameo)	Hindi	English	2018	2018	
Jurassic World: Fallen Kingdom	Jeff Goldblum	Ian Malcolm	Hindi	English	2018	2018	
Captain Marvel	Samuel L. Jackson	Nick Fury	Hindi	English	2019	2019	
Avengers: Endgame	Samuel L. Jackson	Nick Fury (cameo)	Hindi	English	2019	2019	
Spider-Man: Far From Home	Samuel L. Jackson	Nick Fury	Hindi	English	2019	2019	
Hollow Man	Kevin Bacon	Dr. Sebastian Caine	Hindi	English	2000	2000	
Spider-Man: No Way Home	Willem Dafoe	Norman Osborn / Green Goblin	Hindi	English	2021	2021	
No Time to Die	Daniel Craig	James Bond	Hindi	English	2021	2021	
Iron Monkey	Yu Rongguang	Yang Tianchun/Iron Monkey	Hindi	Cantonese Chinese	1993	Unknown	
Jurassic World Dominion	Jeff Goldblum	Ian Malcolm	Hindi	English	2022	2022	
Provoked (film)	Steve McFadden	DS Ron Meyers	Hindi	English	2006	2006	
Glass Onion: A Knives Out Mystery	Daniel Craig	Benoit Blanc	Hindi	English	2022	2022	
A Haunting in Venice	Kenneth Branagh	Hercule Poirot	Hindi	English	2023	2023	
Deadpool & Wolverine	Hugh Jackman	Logan/Wolverine	Hindi	English	2024	2024	

=== Animated films (English) ===
Film title	Original voice	Character	Dub language	Original language	Original year release	Dub year release	Notes
Finding Nemo	Albert Brooks	Marlin	Hindi	English	2003	2003	
Puss in Boots	Guillermo del Toro	Commandante	Hindi	English	2011	2011	Hindi dub released theatrically and also for Home media releases and Television airings. He was credited as: "SHAKTEE SINGH".
Turbo	Samuel L. Jackson	Whiplash	Hindi	English	2013	2013	
Finding Dory	Albert Brooks	Marlin	Hindi	English	2016	2016	
Spies in Disguise	Ben Mendelssohn	Killian	Hindi	English	2019	2020	
The Super Mario Bros. Movie	Fred Armisen	Cranky Kong	Hindi	English	2023	2023	

=== Animated series ===
Program title	Original voice	Character	Dub language	Original language	Number of episodes	Original airdate	Dubbed airdate	Notes
Masters of the Universe vs. The Snake Men	Brian Dobson	Skeletor / Keldor	Hindi	English	39	16 August 2002 – 10 January 2004		

|The legend of Hanuman |Jambavana |Shaktee Singh 2021 - 29 January 2021

== See also ==
- List of Indian dubbing artists
- Dubbing (filmmaking)
