= Sweta Keswani =

Indian television actress (born 1980)

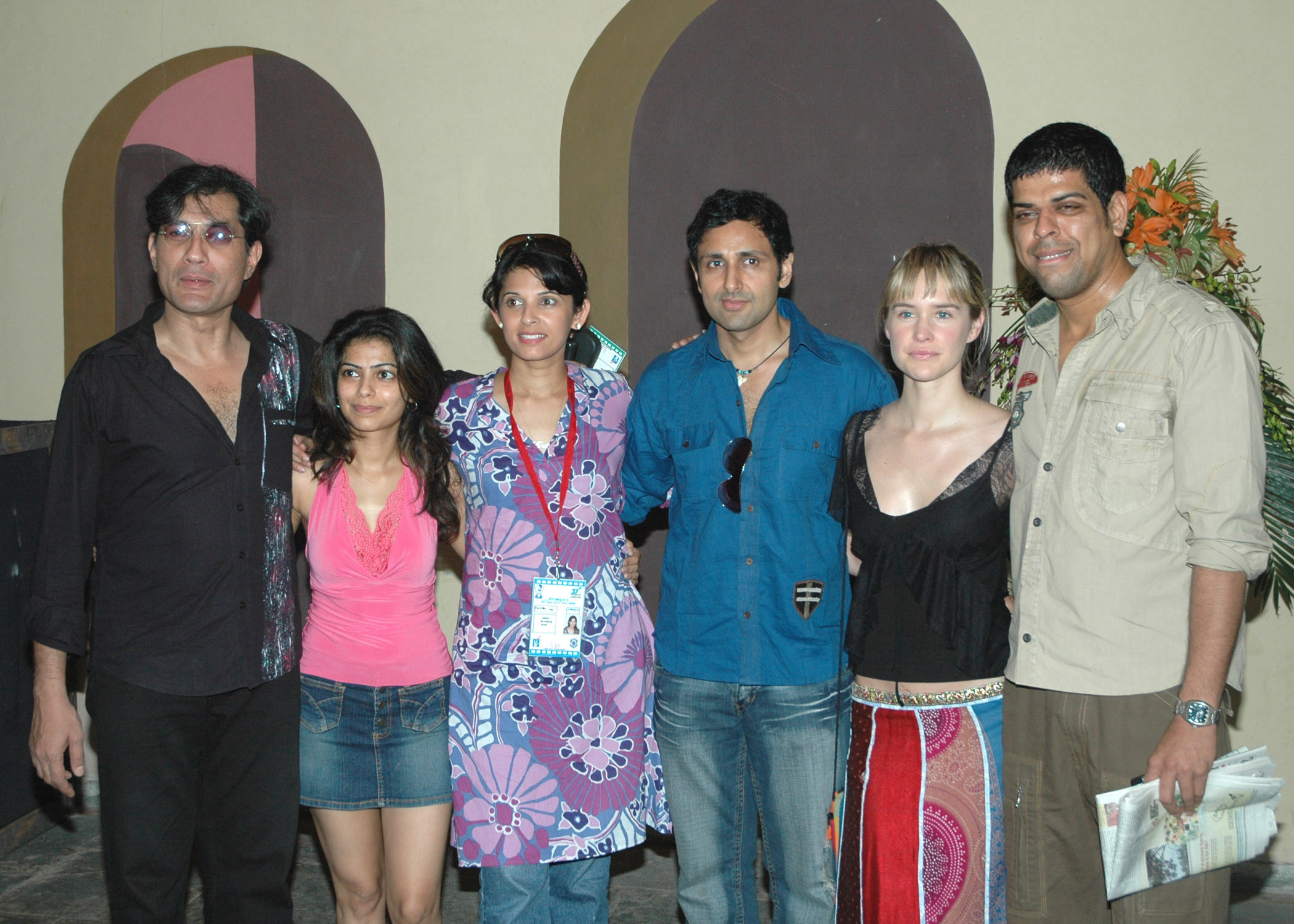
- Keswani at IFFI, 2006
- Born: 19 August 1980 (age 45); Delhi, India
- Occupations: Actress; dancer; model
- Spouses: Alexx O'Nell (m. 2008; div. 2011); Ken Andino (m. 2011)
- Children: Issy Andino (daughter)

Sweta Keswani is an Indian actress, dancer and model, who is known for her roles in Hindi TV shows, Bollywood films and TV commercials. She received fame from Indians globally after playing the role of Gudiya Thakkar in the Star Plus series Baa Bahoo Aur Baby. Apart from her Bollywood career she also had a role in U.S. Television series The Blacklist.

== Personal life ==
Keswani started acting in class two with an adaption of Goldilocks and the Three Bears. She attended MMK College in Mumbai and graduated with a degree in commerce. While she was at school, she started Kathak (an Indian dance form) and kept up with it for about 6 years at Sangit Mahabharati institute and later with Guruji Shri Surinder Kaur, whom she idolizes. Later she trained in jazz dance from Shiamak Davar's.

Keswani is a Soka Gakkai Buddhist and is a leader in the SGI Buddhist community. She has said, "There are many branches of Buddhism but essentially Nichiren Daishonin's Buddhism that I practice is a religion for the 21st century. It is a process of transforming the self by chanting a mantra and through that changing not only ourselves for the better but our environment as well. Chanting gives me the clarity to see what action I should take and how I can make both myself and the people around me happier and more fulfilled."

Since 2020, Keswani has served as the Vice President of River's Edge Theatre Co. in Westchester, NY.

Keswani married American actor Alexx O'Nell in 2008. The couple divorced in 2011. In October 2012, she married NYC-based lawyer Ken Andino, with whom she has a daughter (b. 2013).

== Career ==
After doing many TV commercials for industries such as Wall's Ice Cream, Pond's and Fanta, Keswani entered television with shows such as Kahaani Ghar Ghar Kii and Des Mein Niklla Hoga Chand.

== Filmography ==
=== Films ===
- Love In Nepal (2004)
- Chor Mandli (2005)
- The Memsahib (2006)
- Gas Station On the Expressway (2007)
- Bin Bulaye Baraati (2011)
- Back-up (2013)
- As They Made Us (2022)
- The Beanie Bubble (2023)

=== Television ===
Year	Show	Character	Notes
1999-2000	Abhimaan		
2001	Rishtey (season 1)	Anu	Episodic role
2001–2003	Kahaani Ghar Ghar Kii	Avantika Ajay Agarwal	Negative role
2001-2004	Des Mein Niklla Hoga Chand	Anu Khurana / Anu Samarjeet Singh Kent	Negative role
2002-2004	Arre Deewano Mujhe Pehchano		
2004 - 2005	Raat Hone Ko Hai - Story #47: Tingoo	Monica	Episodic role
2004	Bollywood Aur Kya Special		
2005	Parde Ke Peechey		
2006	Kyunki Yeh Hai Hasya Kavi Muqabala		
2006	Johny Aala Re		
2007	CID - Episode 457: The Case of the Dangerous Lady	Indu	Episodic role
2007	Nach Baliye 3	Herself	
2007–2010	Baa Bahoo Aur Baby	Gurinder "Gudiya" Chadda Thakkar	Lead role
2011	Adaalat	Ms. Keswani	Supporting role
2017	The Blacklist	Maura	Guest role
2021	New Amsterdam	Soma Kulkarni	Guest role
2021	Arranged Marriage		
2025	LAW AND ORDER:SPECIAL VICTIMS UNIT (TV Series)	Dr.Ila Mukherjee	Guest Role

=== Theatre ===
- Residence Visa (2007)
- Fragile (2007)
- Now She Says She's God (2005)
- 3 Aces (2001)
