= List of Aahat episodes =

The following is a list of episodes from the series Aahat.

== Series overview ==
Series	Episodes	Originally released	
Series	Episodes	First released	Last released
1	285	12 October 1995	22 June 2001
2	28	19 November 2004	10 June 2005
3	21	6 January 2007	9 June 2007
4	66	13 November 2009	26 June 2010
5	78	28 June 2010	25 November 2010
6	76	18 February 2015	4 August 2015

== Episodes ==
=== Season 1 (1995–2001) ===
No. overall	No. in season	Title	Casting	Original release date
1	1	"The Closed Room"	Rajesh Khattar, Ashutosh Rana, Utkarsha Naik, Pinky Singh, Ghanashyam Nayak	12 October 1995
Massive heated argument takes place between a husband and his rich wife Seema in their bungalow.
2	2	"Snake"	Shrivallabh Vyas, Prateeksha Lonkar, Shashi Kiran, R.S.Chopra	19 October 1995
Jai wakes up from a bad dream and also shares his dream with his wife.
3	3	"Poison (Part - 1)"	Roshni Achreja, Bobby Khanna, Chandra Mohan, Sanjay Gandhi, Mamata Luthra, Dhananjay Manjrekar	26 October 1995
The senior doctor gets angry with doctor Pradhan. Sudesh's wife Sejal uses poison while gardening. This episode was inspired by the T.V. show Alfred Hitchcock Presents episode Malice Domestic (season 2, episode 20).
4	4	"Poison (Concluding part)"	Roshni Achreja, Bobby Khanna, Chandra Mohan, Sanjay Gandhi, Mamata Luthra, Dhananjay Manjrekar	2 November 1995
The doctor reveals to Sudesh that he was suffering from food poisoning and also doubts on Sudesh's wife Sejal. This episode was inspired by the T.V. show Alfred Hitchcock Presents episode Malice Domestic (season 2, episode 20).
5	5	"The Last Show"	Ananya Khare, Channa Ruparel, Pradeep Saxena	9 November 1995
Filmmaker Subrato Gosh gets highly impressed by Juhi's acting skills and also offers her a role in his big-budget movie.
6	6	"Julia"	Govind Namdev, Lalit Tiwari, Ramesh Rai	16 November 1995
Johnny misses his wife Julia immensely. Julia's husband Johnny receives a letter from Julia who does not exist in the world.
7	7	"The Courtroom"	Anang Desai, Sushil Parashar, Rekha Rao	23 November 1995
Lawyer Ajay Kumar reveals a shocking truth about Rumy who is involved in Ramdass murder case. Rumy tries to prove in the court that he is innocent but he fails and Rumy is sentenced to death.
8	8	"Terror (Part - 1)"	Madan Jain, Surekha Sikri, Dinesh Kaushik, Naresh Suri, Ghazal Khan, Rajlakshmi Solanki	30 November 1995
Ashutosh shares his problem with one of his office colleagues. Ashutosh is upset with his wife Neha's behaviour.
9	9	"Terror (Concluding part)"	Madan Jain, Surekha Sikri, Dinesh Kaushik, Naresh Suri, Ghazal Khan, Rajlakshmi Solanki	7 December 1995
Strange things start happening in Mallika's colony.
10	10	"First Love (Part - 1)"	Harsh Chhaya, Ajay Mankotia, Sunita Krishan, Ravi Patwardhan, Ajit Mehra, Dhananjay Manjrekar, Sushil Parashar	14 December 1995
The doctor reveals to builder Rajat Saxena that he has to keep control of his anger.
11	11	"First Love (Concluding part)"	Harsh Chhaya, Ajay Mankotia, Sunita Krishan, Ravi Patwardhan, Ajit Mehra, Dhananjay Manjrekar, Sushil Parashar	21 December 1995
Police arrest builder Rajat Saxena for beating the biker for no reason.
12	12	"Explosion (Part - 1)"	Ashutosh Rana, Achyut Potdar, Dilip Kulkarni, Sanjay Gandhi, Ramdas Jadhav, Rajesh Vivek, Sayaji Shinde	28 December 1995
A Prisoner releases from the jail that had killed a police officer.
13	13	"Explosion (Part - 2)"	Ashutosh Rana, Achyut Potdar, Dilip Kulkarni, Sanjay Gandhi, Ramdas Jadhav, Rajesh Vivek, Sayaji Shinde	4 January 1996
While Avinash the bomb expert is busy at his job in finding and defusing the bombs.
14	14	"Explosion (Part - 3)"	Ashutosh Rana, Achyut Potdar, Dilip Kulkarni, Sanjay Gandhi, Ramdas Jadhav, Rajesh Vivek, Sayaji Shinde	11 January 1996
Avinash Kale gets to know about Gauri and the criminals meeting. Avinash decides to kill his wife in the bomb blast.
15	15	"Explosion (Concluding part)"	Ashutosh Rana, Achyut Potdar, Dilip Kulkarni, Sanjay Gandhi, Ramdas Jadhav, Rajesh Vivek, Sayaji Shinde	18 January 1996
Avinash plants a bomb in the terrorist house as they were planning to blast Delhi.
16	16	"The Bet (Part - 1)"	Prashant Narayanan, Ravi Gossain, Vijay Maurya, Nissar Khan, Seema Ponkshe, R.S.Chopra, Dhananjay Manjrekar	25 January 1996
A group of medical interns studying in medical colleges are discussing morgue's room. One of the group members accepts the bet and decides to enter the morgue room at midnight.
17	17	"The Bet (Concluding part)"	Prashant Narayanan, Ravi Gossain, Vijay Maurya, Nissar Khan, Seema Ponkshe, R.S.Chopra, Dhananjay Manjrekar	1 February 1996
One of the group members gets attacked by a mannequin in the haunted haveli.
18	18	"Unfaithful (Part - 1)"	Mona Ambegaonkar, Prateeksha Lonkar, Raja Bundela, Ajit Mehra	8 February 1996
Anju Mishra is shocked as she gets to know about her husband Shailesh Mishra's affair with Karuna.
19	19	"Unfaithful (Concluding part)"	Mona Ambegaonkar, Prateeksha Lonkar, Raja Bundela, Ajit Mehra	15 February 1996
Anju Mishra's husband and Karuna's fiancé Shailesh Mishra returns to kill them for brutally killing him for cheating on his wife.
20	20	"Gambler (Part - 1)"	Govind Namdev, Ketki Dave, Deepak Shirke, Bhupendra Awasthi, Neeraj Sharma	22 February 1996
Atul invests all his wife's money in gambling. Despite having money, Atul cannot start a business of his own.
21	21	"Gambler (Concluding part)"	Govind Namdev, Ketki Dave, Deepak Shirke, Bhupendra Awasthi, Neeraj Sharma	29 February 1996
Atul's wife Megha is urgently admitted to the hospital.
22	22	"Ruthless (Part - 1)"	Virendra Saxena, Sunil Barve, Samta Sagar, Lata Haya, Abhay Kulkarni	7 March 1996
Asha finds a shocking letter in her husband's cupboard.
23	23	"Ruthless (Concluding part)"	Virendra Saxena, Sunil Barve, Samta Sagar, Lata Haya, Abhay Kulkarni	14 March 1996
After the sudden vanish of Srikanth in the forest, while he was with Vipul, the police has arrested Vipul for killing Srikanth as the next morning from the same spot in the forest two fired bullets and a bloody ring was found which belonged to Srikanth.
24	24	"Eyewitness (Part - 1)"	Navni Parihar, Dilip Kulkarni, Nikhil Sharma	28 March 1996
Script writer Kavita observes a man murdering his wife in the building which is right opposite to her building. This episode was inspired by Alfred Hitchcock's 1954 film Rear Window.
25	25	"Eyewitness (Concluding part)"	Navni Parihar, Dilip Kulkarni, Nikhil Sharma	4 April 1996
Script writer Kavita observes a man murdering his wife in the building which is right opposite to her building. This episode was inspired by Alfred Hitchcock's 1954 film Rear Window.
26	26	"The Doom (Part - 1)"	Ravi Jhankal, Satyadev Dubey, Ravi Khandvilkar, Uttara Baokar, Mohan Kant	11 April 1996
Karthik urges his friends to come with him and visit Johra Bai. According to him, she can predict the death of the person.
27	27	"The Doom (Concluding part)"	Ravi Jhankal, Satyadev Dubey, Ravi Khandvilkar, Uttara Baokar, Mohan Kant	18 April 1996
An employee in an organization is possessed and says something tragic is about to happen in a week; he is taken to the mental asylum and still he tends to speak the same.
28	28	"Killer Hands (Part - 1)"	Achyut Potdar, Vijay Kashyap, Jharna Dave, Ajay Rohilla	25 April 1996
Yashwant is on the verge of getting hanged by the orders of the court. Dr Goyal comes by the jail and asks him to donate his body in order to some good before dying.
29	29	"Killer Hands (Concluding part)"	Achyut Potdar, Vijay Kashyap, Jharna Dave, Ajay Rohilla	2 May 1996
A man's hands are replaced with a murderer's hands in an operation.
30	30	"Where is Yashwant"	Naresh Suri, Vijayan Nair, Yusuf Khurram, Bapi Bose, Sunil Tawde, Kavita Vaid	16 May 1996
Police is finding Yashwant and is patrolling all over the city.
31	31	"Stiffness (Part - 1)"	Shrivallabh Vyas, Vineet Kumar, Sushil Parashar, Anil Nagrath, Pramatesh Mehta, Ghazal Khan, Roshan khan	23 May 1996
Alka asks Shankar to elope, as her father was trying to get her hitched with someone else. Shankar is a crime story writer and explains his dilemma to Alka while being on a date.
32	32	"Stiffness (Concluding part)"	Shrivallabh Vyas, Vineet Kumar, Sushil Parashar, Anil Nagrath, Pramatesh Mehta, Ghazal Khan, Roshan khan	30 May 1996
Mr. Sinha unfolds the secret of him knowing about Shankar's love life. Shankar pleads guilty and asks for forgiveness.
33	33	"Red Rose (Part - 1)"	Virendra Singh, Abhimanyu Singh, Reshma Polekar, Nissar Khan, Sandeep Kulkarni, Satyajit Sharma, Rajtilak & Second unit director Siddhaye Patel	6 June 1996
The police is concerned with the new serial killer in town. The one who leaves a red rose after stabbing the victim to death. This episode was inspired by the T.V. show Alfred Hitchcock Presents episode The End of Indian Summer (season 2, episode 22).
34	34	"Red Rose (Concluding part)"	Virendra Singh, Abhimanyu Singh, Reshma Polekar, Nissar Khan, Sandeep Kulkarni, Satyajit Sharma, Rajtilak & Second unit director Siddhaye Patel	13 June 1996
Rajesh, disguised as Mr Sibbal goes with Meera to have a look at his new property. He plans to kill her and run away the briefcase full of money. This episode was inspired by the T.V. show Alfred Hitchcock Presents episode The End of Indian Summer (season 2, episode 22).
35	35	"After His Death..."	Anup Soni, Anil Yadav, Vijay Raaz, Seema Ponkshe, Damini	20 June 1996
Mohan is unemployed and in a lot of debts. One day he receives a letter which was meant for someone else. Days later he gets rewarded with 5000 rs from the same person and he pays all his debts.
36	36	"The Wish (Part - 1)"	Arun Bali, Satyadev Dubey, Ragesh Asthana, Ravi Patwardhan, Anuradha Sawant, Meghna Kothari, Dhananjay Manjrekar	27 June 1996
A man calls up the doctor stating he is unwell and sends the doctor back saying he is well. This episode was inspired by W. W. Jacobs' 1902 short story, The Monkey's Paw.
37	37	"The Wish (Concluding part)"	Arun Bali, Satyadev Dubey, Ragesh Asthana, Ravi Patwardhan, Anuradha Sawant, Meghna Kothari, Dhananjay Manjrekar	4 July 1996
Michael is dead at his own residence and his body is cut into pieces. This episode was inspired by W. W. Jacobs' 1902 short story, The Monkey's Paw.
38	38	"The Night"	Chandramohan, Saavri, Prashant Bhatt, Neeta Desai, Mahavir Bhullar	11 July 1996
A couple wakes up hearing some disturbing noise coming from their drawing-room. While inspecting, they find a burglar stealing away their precious jewellery.
39	39	"The Hijack (Part - 1)"	Tushar Dalvi, Shreechand Makhija, Sanjay Mishra, Dr. Vilas Ujawane, Vishal Kandhari, Pinky Singh	18 July 1996
An 18-year-old girl is submitted to a hospital for a heart transplant.
40	40	"The Hijack (Concluding part)"	Tushar Dalvi, Shreechand Makhija, Sanjay Mishra, Dr. Vilas Ujawane, Vishal Kandhari, Pinky Singh	25 July 1996
The lady decides to go to the kidnapper with the bag full of money.
41	41	"The Haunted"	Joan David, Bobby Khanna, Santosh Kaushik, Avinash Kharshikar, Anil Yadav	1 August 1996
Munna comes into the police station asking to save his life from a spirit. This episode was inspired from The Sixth Sense.
42	42	"Reflection (Part - 1)"	Madan Jain, Vineet Kumar, Manoj Pahwa, Nikhil Sharma, Sushil Parashar, R.S.Chopra, Mangala Duggal, Dinesh Phadnis	8 August 1996
A businessman named Khurrana visits a tantrik for some personal closure from his son's early demise.
43	43	"Reflection (Concluding part)"	Madan Jain, Vineet Kumar, Manoj Pahwa, Nikhil Sharma, Sushil Parashar, R.S.Chopra, Mangala Duggal, Dinesh Phadnis	15 August 1996
A strange man walks into Khurrana's bedroom and threatens to kill him.
44	44	"Nectar"	Virendra Saxena, Anil Kocchar, Ramesh Rai	22 August 1996
A scientist was working on a project where he claimed that his serum can bring dead people to life.
45	45	"The Eye - Part I"	Chand Dhar, Dr Arun Patrath, Vijay Raj, Mohan Kant, Samta Sagar, Kanchan Rawal, Pabitra Goregaonkar, Dhananjay Manjrekar	29 August 1996
A well-renowned mentalist hypnotizes a lady in front of many reporters (inspired from the 1990 Telugu film Kokila).
46	46	"The Eye - Part II"	Chand Dhar, Dr Arun Patrath, Vijay Raj, Mohan Kant, Samta Sagar, Kanchan Rawal, Pabitra Goregaonkar, Dhananjay Manjrekar	5 September 1996
A professor comes to rescue the police from the unsolvable case of the great hypnotist's murder.
47	47	"The Time Machine"	Achyut Potdar, Rinku Karmarkar, Tarun Kumar Shukla	12 September 1996
A scientist is experimenting with time travelling. He teaches a lecture about the time travelling possibilities and asks his students to work on a paper regarding that.
48	48	"The Bridegroom - Part I"	Karan Oberoi, Ved Thapar, Phalguni Parekh, Prithvi Zutshi, R.S.Chopra, Pankaj Kabra, Himayat Ali, Mukhesh Jadav, Sunil Mattoo	19 September 1996
A groom lost his life in a road accident.
49	49	"The Bridegroom - Part II"	Karan Oberoi, Ved Thapar, Phalguni Parekh, Prithvi Zutshi, R.S.Chopra, Pankaj Kabra, Himayat Ali, Mukhesh Jadav, Sunil Mattoo	26 September 1996
The police suspect that Shailesh is behind the murders.
50	50	"The Gamble - Part I"	Mohan Gokhale, Satyadev Dubey, Ahmed Khan, Zahid Ali, Jaya Mathur, Ajit Mehra, Shailendra Sharma	3 October 1996
A man is unable to pay for the surgery of his son and decides to take part in a horrific game of gambling.
51	51	"The Gamble - Part II"	Mohan Gokhale, Satyadev Dubey, Ahmed Khan, Zahid Ali, Jaya Mathur, Ajit Mehra, Shailendra Sharma	10 October 1996
The man wins the money to pay for his son's surgery.
52	52	"The Husband"	Priya Tendulkar, Dinesh Kaushik, Deepak Shirke, Roma Navani, Sunil Tawde, Pradeep Nishith	24 October 1996
A struggling actor wants to marry an actress.
53	53	"The Voice - Part I"	Kanwaljit Singh, Jharna Dave, Dr Arun Patrath, Anil Verma, Devi Deshmukh, Madhupriya, Kamal Malik	31 October 1996
A man moves into a new locality with his family.
54	54	"The Voice - Part II"	Kanwaljit Singh, Jharna Dave, Dr Arun Patrath, Anil Verma, Devi Deshmukh, Madhupriya, Kamal Malik	7 November 1996
Sailesh's son starts getting nightmares after moving into a new house.
55	55	"Jaal"	Anup Soni, Navni Parihar, Amit Behl, Reshma Polekar, Yashpal Sharma	14 November 1996
A husband hires an assassin to get his wife killed.
56	56	"Diamonds - Part I"	Raza Murad, Ravi Patwardhan, Chand Dhar, Anil Nagrath, G.P.Singh, Vishal Khandhri, Rajesh Tandon	21 November 1996
A set of diamonds were stolen by a thief but he was caught immediately.
57	57	"Diamonds - Part II"	Raza Murad, Ravi Patwardhan, Chand Dhar, Anil Nagrath, G.P.Singh, Vishal Khandhri, Rajesh Tandon	28 November 1996
The thief finds it hard to pawn the stolen diamonds.
58	58	"Inheritance - Part I"	R.Madhavan, Achyut Potdar, Sanjay Mishra, Varun Mehta, Vipul Jagota, Smita Kalpvriksh	5 December 1996
An old man finds out that he does not have many days to live.
59	59	"Inheritance - Part II"	R.Madhavan, Achyut Potdar, Sanjay Mishra, Varun Mehta, Vipul Jagota, Smita Kalpvriksh	12 December 1996
An old man interchanges his soul with a young man and starts living his life.
60	60	"Who was she? - Part I"	Karan Shah, Deepak Deulkar, Bakul Thakkar, Anand Goradia Persi Shroff, Nikhil Dewan, Reena Kapoor, Alefia Kapadia	19 December 1996
Four friends invite a ghost by planchette but she starts killing them one by one.
61	61	"Who was she? - Part II"	Karan Shah, Deepak Deulkar, Bakul Thakkar, Anand Goradia Persi Shroff, Nikhil Dewan, Reena Kapoor, Alefia Kapadia	26 December 1996
Four friends invite a ghost by planchette but she starts killing them one by one.
62	62	"The Noose - Part I"	Navin Nischol, Ahmed Khan, Jahangir Khan, Bhavani Shankar, Kaushal Kapoor, Abhay Bhargav, Hari Om Parashar	9 January 1997
Judge Lector was notorious for hanging people during British rule.
63	63	"The Noose - Part II"	Navin Nischol, Ahmed Khan, Jahangir Khan, Bhavani Shankar, Kaushal Kapoor, Abhay Bhargav, Hari Om Parashar	16 January 1997
Judge Lector was notorious for hanging people during British rule.
64	64	"The Rain - Part I"	Gufi Paintal, Joan David, Kavita Vaid, Dr Bhupendra Avasthi, Dr Vilas Ujjwane, Ramesh Rai, Rajdev Jamdade	23 January 1997
Four people are stuck in a villa with a watchman on a rainy night.
65	65	"The Rain - Part II"	Gufi Paintal, Joan David, Kavita Vaid, Dr Bhupendra Avasthi, Dr Vilas Ujjwane, Ramesh Rai, Rajdev Jamdade	30 January 1997
Four people are stuck in a villa with a watchman on a rainy night.
66	66	"Anamika - Part I"	Shalini Kapoor, Shreechand Makhija, Rasik Dave, Lovleen Mishra, Nirmal Bhawnani, Vicky Ahuja, Jitendra Trehan, Rio Kapadia, Dhananjay Manjrekar, Raaz Tilak	6 February 1997
A young girl claims that she is the reincarnation of a rich girl who used to live in a big Haveli.
67	67	"Anamika - Part II"	Shalini Kapoor, Shreechand Makhija, Rasik Dave, Lovleen Mishra, Nirmal Bhawnani, Vicky Ahuja, Jitendra Trehan, Rio Kapadia, Dhananjay Manjrekar, Raaz Tilak	13 February 1997
A young girl claims that she is the reincarnation of a rich girl who used to live in a big Haveli.
68	68	"Missing - Part I"	Tej Sapru, Narendra Gupta, Usha Bachani, Sharmilee Raj, G.P. Singh, Anil Yadav	20 February 1997
A missing man is found in the coffin of another dead man.
69	69	"Missing - Part II"	Tej Sapru, Narendra Gupta, Usha Bachani, Sharmilee Raj, G.P. Singh, Anil Yadav	27 February 1997
A missing man is found in the coffin of another dead man.
70	70	"Hunter - Part I"	Shivaji Satam, Ravi Jhankal, Vaquar Shaikh, Ashok Banthia, Vishal Khandhri, Madhu Bharti	6 March 1997
When people go missing in a jungle, a local hunter tries to solve the mystery of 'bodies without a head' with the police.
71	71	"Hunter - Part II"	Shivaji Satam, Ravi Jhankal, Vaquar Shaikh, Ashok Banthia, Vishal Khandhri, Madhu Bharti	13 March 1997
When people go missing in a jungle, a local hunter tries to solve the mystery of 'bodies without a head' with the police.
72	72	"The Lake - Part I"	Mahesh Thakur, Ashok Shinde, Prithvi Zutshi, Gautam, Anand Goradia, Pooja Madan	20 March 1997
The body of a woman, who was having an affair, is found in the lake.
73	73	"The Lake - Part II"	Mahesh Thakur, Ashok Shinde, Prithvi Zutshi, Gautam, Anand Goradia, Pooja Madan	27 March 1997
The body of a woman, who was having an affair, is found in the lake.
74	74	"The 12th Man - Part I"	Bobby Vats, Shadab Khan, Neeraj Sharma, Shahrukh Sadri, Ramesh Rai, Harjeet Walia, Anil Nagrath, Tarun Kumar Shukla, & Cricket coach Lt. shri Ramakant Achrekar	4 April 1997
To get selected in the national cricket team, a cricketer takes help of voodoo to injure the established cricketer.
75	75	"The 12th Man - Part II"	Bobby Vats, Shadab Khan, Neeraj Sharma, Shahrukh Sadri, Ramesh Rai, Harjeet Walia, Anil Nagrath, Tarun Kumar Shukla, & Cricket coach Lt. shri Ramakant Achrekar	11 April 1997
To get selected in the national cricket team, a cricketer takes help of voodoo to injure the established cricketer.
76	76	"MMM 1857 - Part I"	Lalit Parimoo, Deepraj Rana, Radhakrishna Dutta, Rakesh Bidua, Himani Shivpuri, Tarakesh Chauhan, Dhananjay Manjrekar, Vinod Tripathi,	18 April 1997
A car starts killing people who were responsible for the murder of its owner. This episode is inspired by the 1983 film Christine.
77	77	"MMM 1857 - Part II"	Lalit Parimoo, Deepraj Rana, Radhakrishna Dutta, Rakesh Bidua, Himani Shivpuri, Tarakesh Chauhan, Dhananjay Manjrekar, Vinod Tripathi,	25 April 1997
A car kills people who were responsible for the murder of its owner. This episode is inspired by the 1983 film Christine.
78	78	"The Actress"	TBA	2 May 1997
79	79	"The Actress"	TBA	9 May 1997
80	80	"The Mirror - Part I"	Raj Kiran, Anup Soni, Rajeeta Kochhar, Reena Kapoor, Reshhma Polekar, Abhay Bhargav, Kaushal Kapoor, Manish Garg, Dinesh Phadnis	16 May 1997
A mysterious old woman traps a girl in the mirror and sends her reflection into the real world.
81	81	"The Mirror - Part II"	Raj Kiran, Anup Soni, Rajeeta Kochhar, Reena Kapoor, Reshhma Polekar, Abhay Bhargav, Kaushal Kapoor, Manish Garg, Dinesh Phadnis	23 May 1997
A mysterious old woman traps a girl in the mirror and sends her reflection into the real world.
82	82	"The Return - Part I"	Javed Khan, Bharat Kapoor, Dr Bhupendra Avasthi, Shivani Gosain, Anil nagrath, Madhupriya, Sajid Khan	6 June 1997
A man finds a plot of land which can revive dead people if they are buried there.
83	83	"The Return - Part II"	Javed Khan, Bharat Kapoor, Dr Bhupendra Avasthi, Shivani Gosain, Anil nagrath, Madhupriya, Sajid Khan	13 June 1997
A man finds a plot of land which can revive dead people if they are buried there.
84	84	"The Morgue - Part I"	Pavan Malhotra, Saurabh Dubey, Shailendra Sharma, Santosh Kaushik, Vishwajeet, Ramdas Jadhav, Bhavani Shankar, Supriya Vinod, Rakhi Malhotra, Sunil Mattoo	20 June 1997
A man is appointed as a night shift morgue keeper. Two criminals who are already on death row escape and hide in the morgue.
85	85	"The Morgue - Part II"	Pavan Malhotra, Saurabh Dubey, Shailendra Sharma, Santosh Kaushik, Vishwajeet, Ramdas Jadhav, Bhavani Shankar, Supriya Vinod, Rakhi Malhotra, Sunil Mattoo	27 June 1997
A man is appointed as a night shift morgue keeper. Two criminals who are already on death row escape and hide in the morgue.
86	86	"Original or Fake - Part I"	Laxmikant Berde, Raman Kapoor, Ashwini Kalsekar, G.P.Singh, Sunil Rege, Rakesh Hans, Ashiesh Roy, Sunil Tawde	4 July 1997
A music director steals a piece of music but when the music is played, a demon appears and kills the listener, inspired from Paganini Horror.
87	87	"Original or Fake - Part II"	Laxmikant Berde, Raman Kapoor, Ashwini Kalsekar, G.P.Singh, Sunil Rege, Rakesh Hans, Ashiesh Roy, Sunil Tawde	11 July 1997
A music director steals a piece of music but when the music is played, a demon appears and kills the listener, inspired from Paganini Horror.
88	88	"Memory - Part I"	Anang Desai, Vaquar Shaikh, Ali Asgar, Kartika Rane, Nikhil Dewan, Manoj Verma, Raaz Tilak	18 July 1997
A crow tries to take the soul of a young girl to the house of her previous birth.
89	89	"Memory - Part II"	Anang Desai, Vaquar Shaikh, Ali Asgar, Kartika Rane, Nikhil Dewan, Manoj Verma, Raaz Tilak	25 July 1997
A crow tries to take the soul of a young girl to the house of her previous birth.
90	90	"Promise - Part I"	Firdaus Dadi, Roshni Achreja, Sheetal Thakkar, Alefia Kapadia, Shweta Gautam, Madhu Malhotra, Jitendra Trehan, Prithvi Zutshi, Ramesh Rai	1 August 1997
A young girl dies because her hostel mates scare her in a prank but she comes back to take them with her.
91	91	"Promise - Part II"	Firdaus Dadi, Roshni Achreja, Sheetal Thakkar, Alefia Kapadia, Shweta Gautam, Madhu Malhotra, Jitendra Trehan, Prithvi Zutshi, Ramesh Rai	8 August 1997
A young girl dies because her hostel mates scare her in a prank but she comes back to take them with her.
92	92	"The Call - Part I"	Achyut Potdar, Haidar Ali, Utkarsha Naik, Chandra Mohan, Kavita Vaid, Tarakesh Chauhan	15 August 1997
A Tantrik creates a demonic sign on the door of a doctor as he feels people are no longer coming to him for their troubles because of her. The sign invites a demon who takes the form of the victim's friend and calls in his voice.
93	93	"The Call - Part II"	Achyut Potdar, Haidar Ali, Utkarsha Naik, Chandra Mohan, Kavita Vaid, Tarakesh Chauhan	22 August 1997
A Tantrik creates a demonic sign on the door of a doctor as he feels people are no longer coming to him for their troubles because of her. The sign invites a demon who takes the form of the victim's friend and calls in his voice.
94	94	"The Lemon - Part I"	Ravi Jhankal, Dilip Kulkarni, Shubhangi Gokhale, Lata Haya, Harjeet Walia, Honey Chhaya, Subhangi latkar, Sunil Nagar	29 August 1997
A man gets possessed by a demon when he goes to a lake to get water. Later, the demon gets trapped inside a lemon and thrown on a square.
95	95	"The Lemon - Part II"	Ravi Jhankal, Dilip Kulkarni, Shubhangi Gokhale, Lata Haya, Harjeet Walia, Honey Chhaya, Subhangi latkar, Sunil Nagar	5 September 1997
A man gets possessed by a demon when he goes to a lake to get water. Later, the demon gets trapped inside a lemon and thrown on a square.
96	96	"The Trespasser - Part I"	Sudesh Berry, Achint Kaur, Raymond Singh, Ragesh Asthana, Sushil Parashar, Vinod Pandey	12 September 1997
A couple finds a house on rent but soon the wife starts behaving strangely.
97	97	"The Trespasser - Part II"	Sudesh Berry, Achint Kaur, Raymond Singh, Ragesh Asthana, Sushil Parashar, Vinod Pandey	19 September 1997
A couple finds a house on rent but soon the wife starts behaving strangely.
98	98	"Hide And Seek - Part I"	Raj Kiran, Satyadev Dubey, Deepak Shirke, Shalini Kapoor, Samta Sagar	26 September 1997
A criminal escapes from a mental hospital and gets the power of invisibility.
99	99	"Hide And Seek - Part II"	Raj Kiran, Satyadev Dubey, Deepak Shirke, Shalini Kapoor, Samta Sagar	3 October 1997
A criminal escapes from a mental hospital and gets the power of invisibility.
100	100	"Jaagte Raho - Part I"	Om Puri, Kanwaljit Singh, Neha Sharad, Dr Bhupendra Avasthi, Tarakesh Chauhan, Chetanya Adib, Dhananajay Manjrekar	10 October 1997
A magician tries to kill a doctor in his dreams because the doctor discovers the magician's secret. Meanwhile, the doctor has to avoid sleep to remain alive. This episode is inspired by A Nightmare on Elm Street.
101	101	"Jaagte Raho - Part II"	Om Puri, Kanwaljit Singh, Neha Sharad, Dr Bhupendra Avasthi, Tarakesh Chauhan, Chetanya Adib, Dhananajay Manjrekar	17 October 1997
A magician tries to kill a doctor in his dreams because the doctor discovers the magician's secret. Meanwhile, the doctor has to avoid sleep to remain alive. This episode is inspired by A Nightmare on Elm Street.
102	102	"Doll ( Part 1 )"	Tushar Dalvi, Purvi Sanghvi, Reshma Polekar, Virendra Singh, G.P.Singh, Abhay Bhargav, Dr.Vilas Ujjwane, Baby Ghazala Selmin	24 October 1997
Nina is a dead girl whose ghost lives in a doll. This episode is inspired by Child's Play.
103	103	"Doll ( Part 2 )"	Tushar Dalvi, Purvi Sanghvi, Reshma Polekar, Virendra Singh, G.P.Singh, Abhay Bhargav, Dr.Vilas Ujjwane, Baby Ghazala Selmin	7 November 1997
Nina is a dead girl whose ghost lives in a doll. This episode is inspired by Child's Play.
104	104	"The Deep ( Part 1 )"	Mohan Gokhale, Raju Kher, Ahmed Khan, Deepak Deulkar	14 November 1997
A man finds a sea shell which is the home of a demon. If a person blows in the shell, the demon comes out and takes control of the person's body to go on a killing spree.
105	105	"The Deep ( Part 2 )"	Mohan Gokhale, Raju Kher, Ahmed Khan, Deepak Deulkar	21 November 1997
A man finds a sea shell which is the home of a demon. If a person blows in the shell, the demon comes out and takes control of the person's body to go on a killing spree.
106	106	"Power ( Part 1 )"	Shivaji Satam, Vaquar Shaikh, Narendra Gupta, Dr Bhupendra Avasthi, Ramesh Rai, Madhu Malhotra	28 November 1997
A man can see the future of the person if he touches anything used by them. A girl gets kidnapped and he tries to find her location but he sees his own death.
107	107	"Power ( Part 2 )"	Shivaji Satam, Vaquar Shaikh, Narendra Gupta, Dr Bhupendra Avasthi, Ramesh Rai, Madhu Malhotra	5 December 1997
A man can see the future of the person if he touches anything used by them. A girl gets kidnapped and he tries to find her location but he sees his own death.
108	108	"Ward Number 33 ( Part 1 )"	Ashutosh Gowariker, Mona Ambegaonkar, Shishir Sharma, Jignesh Joshi, Anil Chowdhury, Anil Yadav, Vicky Ahuja, Ashok Banthia, Sushil Parashar	12 December 1997
A ghost is seen in front of the ward of a hospital after which four patients die.
109	109	"Ward Number 33 ( Part 2 )"	Ashutosh Gowariker, Mona Ambegaonkar, Shishir Sharma, Jignesh Joshi, Anil Chowdhury, Anil Yadav, Vicky Ahuja, Ashok Banthia, Sushil Parashar	19 December 1997
A ghost is seen in front of the ward of a hospital after which four patients die.
110	110	"The Jungle Part 1"	Karan Oberoi, Achint Kaur, Kartika Rane, Sanvri, Bakul Thakkar, Anand Goradia, Jahangir Khan, Ramesh Goyal, Shahrukh Sadri, Ritwika Dey	26 December 1997
The ghosts of two escaped prisoners, who continue to haunt a jungle after their death, kill a group of trekkers.
111	111	"The Jungle Part 2"	Karan Oberoi, Achint Kaur, Kartika Rane, Sanvri, Bakul Thakkar, Anand Goradia, Jahangir Khan, Ramesh Goyal, Shahrukh Sadri, Ritwika Dey	9 January 1998
The ghosts of two escaped prisoners, who continue to haunt a jungle after their death, kill a group of trekkers.
112	112	"Revenge ( Part 1 )"	Vijay Kashyap, Pawan Malhotra, Dilip Kulkarni, Gautam Chaturvedi, Sajni Hanspal, Vishwajeet, Dhananjay Manjrekar	16 January 1998
A man gets a magical typewriter which possesses the ability to change reality based on what is typed on it. This episode was inspired from The Tale of the Dream Machine, episode 5 from season 2 of Are You Afraid of the Dark?
113	113	"Revenge ( Part 2 )"	Vijay Kashyap, Pawan Malhotra, Dilip Kulkarni, Gautam Chaturvedi, Sajni Hanspal, Vishwajeet, Dhananjay Manjrekar	23 January 1998
A man gets a magical typewriter which possesses the ability to change reality based on what is typed on it.
114	114	"Secret ( Part 1 )"	Shrivallabh Vyas, Sanjeev Seth, Reena Kapoor, Subhangi Latkar, Jeet, Sunil Tawde, Jeet Atal, Dinesh Phadnis	30 January 1998
A 200-year-old man steals the hearts of his victims to keep himself young and later makes those victims his slave.
115	115	"Secret ( Part 2 )"	Shrivallabh Vyas, Sanjeev Seth, Reena Kapoor, Subhangi Latkar, Jeet, Sunil Tawde, Jeet Atal, Dinesh Phadnis	6 February 1998
A 200-year-old man steals the hearts of his victims to keep himself young and later makes those victims his slave.
116	116	"Photo (Part 1)"	Sulabha Deshpande, Haidar Ali, Naresh Suri, Supriya Vinod, Shweta Gautam	13 February 1998
A girl is trapped in a painting created by an evil painter.
117	117	"Photo (Part 2)"	Sulabha Deshpande, Haidar Ali, Naresh Suri, Supriya Vinod, Shweta Gautam	20 February 1998
A girl is trapped in a painting created by an evil painter.
118	118	"The Curse ( Part I )"	Raj Kiran, Amarnath Mukherjee, Reshma Polekar, Dinesh Sehgal, Harish Shetty	27 February 1998
A young girl seeks help from a man who has the power of finding things. He does so using an instrument, that moves when the object is around. She takes him to her house which is full of money and jewellery, which cannot be taken outside because of a curse.
119	119	"The Curse ( Part II )"	Raj Kiran, Amarnath Mukherjee, Reshma Polekar, Dinesh Sehgal, Harish Shetty	6 March 1998
A young girl seeks help from a man who has the power of finding things. He does so using an instrument, that moves when the object is around. She takes him to her house which is full of money and jewellery, which cannot be taken outside because of a curse.
120	120	"Jeevan Mrityu - Part I"	A.K. Hangal, Shilpi Bhattacharya, Milind Gawali, Vandana Sajnani, Sunil Dhawan, Anil Nagrath	13 March 1998
A hospital has been conducting research on people who have had near-death experiences.
121	121	"Jeevan Mrityu - Part II"	A.K. Hangal, Shilpi Bhattacharya, Milind Gawali, Vandana Sajnani, Sunil Dhawan, Anil Nagrath	20 March 1998
A hospital has been conducting research on people who have had near-death experiences.
122	122	"Imagination - Part I"	Mohan Gokhale, Meenakshi Gupta, Dr Bhupendra Awasthi, Tarakesh Chauhan, Dhananjay Manjrekar	27 March 1998
A young girl suspects her neighbour and his son to be blood-thirsty vampires.
123	123	"Imagination - Part II"	Mohan Gokhale, Meenakshi Gupta, Dr Bhupendra Awasthi, Tarakesh Chauhan, Dhananjay Manjrekar	3 April 1998
A young girl suspects her neighbour and his son to be blood-thirsty vampires.
124	124	"Time - Part I"	Madan Jain, Kabir Sadanand, Raymond Singh, Shishir Sharma, Ahmed Khan, Kavita Vaid	10 April 1998
A man attempts to go back in time to save a girl that dies in an event that occurred a hundred years ago.
125	125	"Time - Part II"	Madan Jain, Kabir Sadanand, Raymond Singh, Shishir Sharma, Ahmed Khan, Kavita Vaid	17 April 1998
A man attempts to go back in time to save a girl that dies in an event that occurred a hundred years ago.
126	126	"Search - Part I"	Ravi Jhankal, Rajesh Khera, Sushil Parashar, Jahangir Khan, Jeet Atal, Dhananjay Manjrekar	24 April 1998
A shoe thief gets possessed by a colonel’s ghost when he wears the colonel's shoes.
127	127	"Search - Part II"	Ravi Jhankal, Rajesh Khera, Sushil Parashar, Jahangir Khan, Jeet Atal, Dhananjay Manjrekar	1 May 1998
A shoe thief gets possessed by a colonel’s ghost when he wears the colonel's shoes.
128	128	"Lifeguard (PartI)"	Kabir Sadanand, Resham Tipnis, Pramod Kapoor, Sunil Tawde	8 May 1998
A person dies in a swimming pool because of the irresponsible behaviour of a lifeguard.
129	129	"Lifeguard (PartII)"	Kabir Sadanand, Resham Tipnis, Pramod Kapoor, Sunil Tawde	15 May 1998
A person dies in a swimming pool because of the irresponsible behaviour of a lifeguard.
130	130	"Character - Part I"	Sangeeta Ghosh, Ragesh Asthana, Sandeep Kulkarni, Vikram Sahu, Sonika Sahay	22 May 1998
A dead struggling actress returns and haunts a film crew because the film producer steals a story which was written originally for the actress.
131	131	"Character - Part II"	Sangeeta Ghosh, Ragesh Asthana, Sandeep Kulkarni, Vikram Sahu, Sonika Sahay	29 May 1998
A dead struggling actress returns and haunts a film crew because the film producer steals a story which was written originally for the actress.
132	132	"The Incident - Part I"	Mona Ambegaonkar, Reshma Polekar, Lalit Parimoo, Deepraj Rana, Dr. Bhupendra Avasthi, Manish Garg	5 June 1998
A woman witnesses an incident where a girl gets thrown from the sixth floor by someone.
133	133	"The Incident - Part II"	Mona Ambegaonkar, Reshma Polekar, Lalit Parimoo, Deepraj Rana, Dr. Bhupendra Avasthi, Manish Garg	12 June 1998
A woman witnesses an incident where a girl gets thrown from the sixth floor by someone.
134	134	"Third Eye - Part I"	Reena Kapoor, Kenny Desai, Sushil Parashar, Shweta Gautam, Bhavani Shankar, Kaushal Kapoor	19 June 1998
A girl tries to find the killer of her father. She inherits the power of feeling any person’s current state by using their personal belongings.
135	135	"Third Eye - Part II"	Reena Kapoor, Kenny Desai, Sushil Parashar, Shweta Gautam, Bhavani Shankar, Kaushal Kapoor	26 June 1998
A girl tries to find the killer of her father. She inherits the power of feeling any person’s current state by using their personal belongings.
136	136	"Alert - Part I"	Sanjeev Seth, Kiran Karmarkar, Urvashi Dholakia, Kavita Rathod, Jyotsna Karyekar Rekha Rao, Neena Kulkarni	3 July 1998
A man sees his own murder by an unknown woman. He suspects that the woman is his wife.
137	137	"Alert - Part II"	Sanjeev Seth, Kiran Karmarkar, Urvashi Dholakia, Kavita Rathod, Jyotsna Karyekar Rekha Rao, Neena Kulkarni	10 July 1998
A man sees his own murder by an unknown woman. He suspects that the woman is his wife.
138	138	"Time - Part I"	Akhilendra Mishra, Sunil Tawde, Asha Bachani	17 July 1998
A magician’s grandfather clock can control the time. If the clock runs forward, the person ages and dies eventually.
139	139	"Time - Part II"	Akhilendra Mishra, Sunil Tawde, Asha Bachani	24 July 1998
A magician’s grandfather clock can control the time. If the clock runs forward, the person ages and dies eventually.
140	140	"Duplicate - Part I"	Pooja Madan, Dilip Kulkarni	31 July 1998
After losing her husband and child in an accident, a woman loses her will to live. Her strange behaviour makes her friends think that she has multiple personality disorders.
141	141	"Duplicate - Part II"	Pooja Madan, Dilip Kulkarni	7 August 1998
After losing her husband and child in an accident, a woman loses her will to live. Her strange behaviour makes her friends think that she has multiple personality disorders.
142	142	"Drinker - Part I"	Makrand Deshpande, Masood Akhtar, Ramesh Rai, Supriya Karnik, Kapil Konark, Tarakesh Chauhan, Anuja Lokre, Harish Shetty, Karanvir Bohra	14 August 1998
A heavy drinker wants to leave the city because he starts seeing ghosts when he consumes liquor.
143	143	"Drinker - Part II"	Makrand Deshpande, Masood Akhtar, Ramesh Rai, Supriya Karnik, Kapil Konark, Tarakesh Chauhan, Anuja Lokre, Harish Shetty, Karanvir Bohra	21 August 1998
A heavy drinker wants to leave the city because he starts seeing ghosts when he consumes liquor.
144	144	"Telephone - Part I"	Reshma Polekar, Sandeep Kulkarni, Honey Chhaya, Kamal Adib, Manish Garg	28 August 1998
A doctor finds that the telephone in her clinic tries to communicate with her about the murder of the previous doctor that used to work there.
145	145	"Telephone - Part II"	Reshma Polekar, Sandeep Kulkarni, Honey Chhaya, Kamal Adib, Manish Garg	4 September 1998
A doctor finds that the telephone in her clinic tries to communicate with her about the murder of the previous doctor that used to work there.
146	146	"Sakshi - Part I"	Rajesh Khera, Lalan Sarang, Firdaus Dadi, Rajendra Chawla	11 September 1998
A dead girl returns to take revenge on the girl who was living her life using her name.
147	147	"Sakshi - Part II"	Rajesh Khera, Lalan Sarang, Firdaus Dadi, Rajendra Chawla	18 September 1998
A dead girl returns to take revenge on the girl who was living her life using her name.
148	148	"Scarecrow - Part I"	Achint Kaur, Sangeeta Ghosh, Naresh Suri, Anwar Fatehi, Sai Ballal	25 September 1998
A scarecrow comes to life to kill the people of a village who are hiding a cruel past.
149	149	"Scarecrow - Part I"	Achint Kaur, Sangeeta Ghosh, Naresh Suri, Anwar Fatehi, Sai Ballal	2 October 1998
A scarecrow comes to life to kill the people of a village who are hiding a cruel past.
150	150	"Barrack No. 18 - Part I"	Aditya Shrivastav, Ravi Jhankal, Anant Jog, Anirudh Agarwal, Chetan Pandit, G.P. Singh, Hari Om Parashar, Shailendra Srivastav	9 October 1998
An innocent prisoner haunts a jail barrack because he was hanged for a crime he didn’t commit.
151	151	"Barrack No. 18 - Part II"	Aditya Shrivastav, Ravi Jhankal, Anant Jog, Anirudh Agarwal, Chetan Pandit, G.P. Singh, Hari Om Parashar, Shailendra Srivastav	23 October 1998
An innocent prisoner haunts a jail barrack because he was hanged for a crime he didn’t commit.
152	152	"Future"	Akhilendra Mishra, Shrivallabh Vyas, Dr Bhupendra Avasthi, Kaushal Kapoor, Anil Nagrath	30 October 1998
153	153	"Future"	Akhilendra Mishra, Shrivallabh Vyas, Dr Bhupendra Avasthi, Kaushal Kapoor, Anil Nagrath	6 November 1998
154	154	"Morning"	Achyut Potdar, Ashok Banthia, Dilip Kulkarni, Ahmed Khan, Reshma Polekar, Jahangir Khan, Chetanya Adib, Kumar Hegde	13 November 1998
155	155	"Morning"	Achyut Potdar, Ashok Banthia, Dilip Kulkarni, Ahmed Khan, Reshma Polekar, Jahangir Khan, Chetanya Adib, Kumar Hegde	20 November 1998
156	156	"The Locked Door"	Neena Kulkarni, Sanvri, Asha Bachani, Jyotsna Karyekar	27 November 1998
157	157	"The Locked Door"	Neena Kulkarni, Sanvri, Asha Bachani, Jyotsna Karyekar	4 December 1998
158	158	"Avinash"	Dinesh Kaushik, Manoj Pandey, Sangeeta Ghosh, Urvashi Dholakia, Neelam Sagar, Pramathesh Mehta	11 December 1998
159	159	"Avinash"	Dinesh Kaushik, Manoj Pandey, Sangeeta Ghosh, Urvashi Dholakia, Neelam Sagar, Pramathesh Mehta	18 December 1998
160	160	"Guest - Part 1"	Aditya Shrivastav, Nagesh Bhonsle, Ashish Duggal, Dr Vilas Ujjwane, Ramesh Rai, Hansa Singh	25 December 1998
161	161	"Guest - Part 2"	Aditya Shrivastav, Nagesh Bhonsle, Ashish Duggal, Dr Vilas Ujjwane, Ramesh Rai, Hansa Singh	1 January 1999
162	162	"The Camera - Part 1"	Pooja Madan, Deepan Vartak, Vikram Sahu, Sunil Dhawan, Ali Khan, Chandra Mohan, Sunil Tawde	8 January 1999
163	163	"The Camera - Part 2"	Pooja Madan, Deepan Vartak, Vikram Sahu, Sunil Dhawan, Ali Khan, Chandra Mohan, Sunil Tawde	15 January 1999
164	164	"The Accident - Part 1"	Tushar Dalvi, Haidar Ali, Ashwin Kaushal, Resham Tipnis, Hansa Singh Manish Garg, Wishwajeet, Dheeraj Sarna, Ashish Kapoor, Persi Shroff	22 January 1999
165	165	"The Accident - Part 2"	Tushar Dalvi, Haidar Ali, Ashwin Kaushal, Resham Tipnis, Hansa Singh Manish Garg, Wishwajeet, Dheeraj Sarna, Ashish Kapoor, Persi Shroff	5 February 1999
166	166	"Amanush - Part 1"	Naresh Suri, Lalit Parimoo, Smita Kalpvriksh, Shivani Gosain, Chetan Pandit, Sunil Rege, Prem Lala, Ramesh Rai	12 February 1999
167	167	"Amanush - Part 2"	Naresh Suri, Lalit Parimoo, Smita Kalpvriksh, Shivani Gosain, Chetan Pandit, Sunil Rege, Prem Lala, Ramesh Rai	19 February 1999
168	168	"The Magic - Part 1"	Madan Jain, Milind Gawali, Reshma Polekar	26 February 1999
169	169	"The Magic - Part 2"	Madan Jain, Milind Gawali, Reshma Polekar	5 March 1999
170	170	"The Face - Part 1"	Sanjeev Seth, Abhay Bhargav, Prateeksha Lonkar, Shweta Gautam, Nikhil Dewan, Manish Garg, Sunil Tawde	12 March 1999
171	171	"The Face - Part 2"	Sanjeev Seth, Abhay Bhargav, Prateeksha Lonkar, Shweta Gautam, Nikhil Dewan, Manish Garg, Sunil Tawde	19 March 1999
172	172	"Fire - Part 1"	Anant Jog, Saurabh Dubey, Subhangi Latkar, Sajni Hanspal, Gautam Chaturvedi	26 March 1999
173	173	"Fire - Part 2"	Anant Jog, Saurabh Dubey, Subhangi Latkar, Sajni Hanspal, Gautam Chaturvedi	2 April 1999
174	174	"The Roommate - Part 1"	Firdaus Dadi, Manasi Salvi, Amar Upadhyay, Pamela Mukherjee, Shraddha Arya	9 April 1999
175	175	"The Roommate - Part 2"	Firdaus Dadi, Manasi Salvi, Amar Upadhyay, Pamela Mukherjee, Shraddha Arya	16 April 1999
176	176	"Room No. 402 - Part 1"	Mona Ambegaonkar, Roshni Achreja, Milind Gawali, Jahangir Khan, Shishir Sharma, Chandra Mohan, Pankaj Singh Budhama	23 April 1999
177	177	"Room No. 402 - Part 2"	Mona Ambegaonkar, Roshni Achreja, Milind Gawali, Jahangir Khan, Shishir Sharma, Chandra Mohan, Pankaj Singh Budhama	30 April 1999
178	178	"Yesterday - Part 1"	Akhilendra Mishra, Akshay Anand, Shubhangi Gokhale, Hari Om Parashar, Harish Shetty	7 May 1999
179	179	"Yesterday - Part 2"	Akhilendra Mishra, Akshay Anand, Shubhangi Gokhale, Hari Om Parashar, Harish Shetty	14 May 1999
180	180	"The Woman - Part 1"	Kabir Sadanand, Mita Vashisht, Sanvri, Neena Kulkarni, Ahmed Khan, Ravi Patwardhan, Radhakrishna Dutta	21 May 1999
181	181	"The Woman - Part 2"	Kabir Sadanand, Mita Vashisht, Sanvri, Neena Kulkarni, Ahmed Khan, Ravi Patwardhan, Radhakrishna Dutta	28 May 1999
182	182	"Astray - Part 1"	Seema Shetty, Purbi Joshi, Bakul Thakkar, Ghazala Selmin	4 June 1999
183	183	"Astray - Part 2"	Seema Shetty, Purbi Joshi, Bakul Thakkar, Ghazala Selmin	11 June 1999
184	184	"Consequences - Part 1"	Surekha Sikri, Deepak Shirke, Jaimini Pathak, Ashish Duggal, Anuj Gupta, Ramesh Rai	18 June 1999
185	185	"Consequences - Part 2"	Surekha Sikri, Deepak Shirke, Jaimini Pathak, Ashish Duggal, Anuj Gupta, Ramesh Rai	25 June 1999
186	186	"Possession - Part 1"	Shrivallabh Vyas, Vaquar Shaikh, Reshma Polekar, Vani Tripathi, Sunil Dhawan, Sonika Sahay, Gagan Gupta	2 July 1999
187	187	"Possession - Part 2"	Shrivallabh Vyas, Vaquar Shaikh, Reshma Polekar, Vani Tripathi, Sunil Dhawan, Sonika Sahay, Gagan Gupta	9 July 1999
188	188	TBA	TBA	16 July 1999
189	189	TBA	TBA	23 July 1999
190	190	"The Talking Skull - Part 1"	Pawan Malhotra, Sunila Karambelkar, Vivek Mishra, Sunil Dhawan	30 July 1999
191	191	"The Talking Skull - Part 2"	Pawan Malhotra, Sunila Karambelkar, Vivek Mishra, Sunil Dhawan	6 August 1999
192	192	TBA	TBA	13 August 1999
193	193	TBA	TBA	20 August 1999
194	194	"Route No. 61 - Part 1"	Anant Jog, Chaitanya, Sajni Hanspal, Amit Behl, Dheeraj Sarna, Manish Garg	27 August 1999
195	195	"Route No. 61 - Part 2"	Anant Jog, Chaitanya, Sajni Hanspal, Amit Behl, Dheeraj Sarna, Manish Garg	3 September 1999
196	196	"The Last Reel - Part 1"	Mandira Bedi, Lalit Parimoo, Smita Bansal, Sanjay Swaraj, Ashok Banthia, Dinesh Kaushik	10 September 1999
197	197	"The Last Reel - Part 2"	Mandira Bedi, Lalit Parimoo, Smita Bansal, Sanjay Swaraj, Ashok Banthia, Dinesh Kaushik	17 September 1999
198	198	"Encounter - Part 1"	Firdaus Dadi, Rajesh Khera, Seema Shetty, Ravi Gossain, Vishwajeet, Kiran Chandra, Deepak Qazir	24 September 1999
199	199	"Encounter - Part 2"	Firdaus Dadi, Rajesh Khera, Seema Shetty, Ravi Gossain, Vishwajeet, Kiran Chandra, Deepak Qazir	1 October 1999
200	200	"Unknown"	TBA	8 October 1999
201	201	"Unknown"	TBA	15 October 1999
202	202	"Faces - Part 1"	Manasi Salvi, Rushali, Naresh Suri, Jahangir Khan, Rekha Rao	22 October 1999
203	203	"Faces - Part 2"	Manasi Salvi, Rushali, Naresh Suri, Jahangir Khan, Rekha Rao	5 November 1999
204	204	"Tina - Part 1"	Smita Bansal, Anant Jog, Bakul Thakkar, Salim Shah	12 November 1999
205	205	"Tina - Part 2"	Smita Bansal, Anant Jog, Bakul Thakkar, Salim Shah	19 November 1999
206	206	"Death Sentence - Part 1"	Madan Jain, Dilip Kulkarni, Deepen Vartak, Shailendra Srivastav	26 November 1999
207	207	"Death Sentence - Part 2"	Madan Jain, Dilip Kulkarni, Deepen Vartak, Shailendra Srivastav	3 December 1999
208	208	"Mulaqat - Part I"	TBA	10 December 1999
209	209	"Mulaqat - Part II"	TBA	17 December 1999
210	210	"Kaayar - Part I"	TBA	24 December 1999
211	211	"Kaayar - Part II"	TBA	31 December 1999
212	212	"Tohfa - Part I"	TBA	7 January 2000
213	213	"Tohfa - Part II"	TBA	14 January 2000
214	214	"The Last Wish - Part I"	TBA	28 January 2000
215	215	"The Last Wish - Part II"	TBA	4 February 2000
216	216	"Jaadugar - Part I"	TBA	11 February 2000
217	217	"Jaadugar - Part II"	TBA	18 February 2000
218	218	"The Mourner - Part I"	TBA	25 February 2000
219	219	"The Mourner - Part II"	TBA	3 March 2000
220	220	"Unknown"	TBA	10 March 2000
221	221	"Unknown"	TBA	17 March 2000
222	222	"Unknown"	TBA	24 March 2000
223	223	"Unknown"	TBA	31 March 2000
224	224	"Unknown"	TBA	7 April 2000
225	225	"Unknown"	TBA	14 April 2000
226	226	"Teen Qaidi - Part I"	TBA	21 April 2000
227	227	"Teen Qaidi - Part II"	TBA	28 April 2000
228	228	"Unknown"	TBA	5 May 2000
229	229	"Unknown"	TBA	12 May 2000
230	230	"Unknown"	TBA	19 May 2000
231	231	"Unknown"	TBA	26 May 2000
232	232	"Unknown"	TBA	2 June 2000
233	233	"Unknown"	TBA	9 June 2000
234	234	"Unknown"	TBA	16 June 2000
235	235	"Unknown"	TBA	23 June 2000
236	236	"Unknown"	TBA	30 June 2000
237	237	"Unknown"	TBA	7 July 2000
238	238	"Unknown"	TBA	14 July 2000
239	239	"Unknown"	TBA	21 July 2000
240	240	"Unknown"	TBA	28 July 2000
241	241	"Unknown"	TBA	4 August 2000
242	242	"Unknown"	TBA	11 August 2000
243	243	"Unknown"	TBA	18 August 2000
244	244	"Unknown"	TBA	25 August 2000
245	245	"Unknown"	TBA	1 September 2000
246	246	"Unknown"	TBA	8 September 2000
247	247	"Unknown"	TBA	15 September 2000
248	248	"Unknown"	TBA	22 September 2000
249	249	"Unknown"	TBA	29 September 2000
250	250	"Unknown"	TBA	13 October 2000
251	251	"Unknown"	TBA	20 October 2000
252	252	"Unknown"	TBA	27 October 2000
253	253	"Unknown"	TBA	3 November 2000
254	254	"Unknown"	TBA	10 November 2000
255	255	"Unknown"	TBA	17 November 2000
256	256	"Unknown"	TBA	24 November 2000
257	257	"Unknown"	TBA	1 December 2000
258	258	"Night Collage - Part I"	TBA	8 December 2000
259	259	"Night Collage - Part II"	TBA	15 December 2000
260	260	"Unknown"	TBA	22 December 2000
261	261	"Unknown"	TBA	29 December 2000
262	262	"Unknown"	TBA	5 January 2001
263	263	"Unknown"	TBA	12 January 2001
264	264	"Saazish"	TBA	26 January 2001
265	265	"Saazish"	TBA	2 February 2001
266	266	"Unknown"	TBA	9 February 2001
267	267	"Unknown"	TBA	16 February 2001
268	268	"The Apartment - Part I"	TBA	23 February 2001
269	269	"The Apartment - Part II"	TBA	2 March 2001
270	270	"The Lodge - Part I"	TBA	9 March 2001
271	271	"The Lodge - Part II"	TBA	16 March 2001
272	272	"Unknown"	TBA	23 March 2001
273	273	"Unknown"	TBA	30 March 2001
274	274	"Unknown"	TBA	6 April 2001
275	275	"Unknown"	TBA	13 April 2001
276	276	"Unknown"	TBA	20 April 2001
277	277	"Unknown"	TBA	27 April 2001
278	278	"Unknown"	TBA	4 May 2001
279	279	"Unknown"	TBA	11 May 2001
280	280	"Unknown"	TBA	18 May 2001
281	281	"Unknown"	TBA	25 May 2001
282	282	"Final Year - Part I"	TBA	1 June 2001
283	283	"Final Year - Part II"	TBA	8 June 2001
284	284	"Nightmare Disco - Part I"	TBA	15 June 2001
285	285	"Nightmare Disco - Part II"	TBA	22 June 2001
286	286	"Mud"	Varsha Usgaonkar, Nawab Shah, Ahmed Khan, Reshma Polekar, Aparna Chaudhary	TBA
A forest’s soil is evil. It kills people who go near to the soil and replaces them with their evil version created by the same soil.
287	287	"13th Floor"	Tanaaz Currim, Rajita Kochar, Jayant Kripalani, Bijoy Anand	TBA
A building does not have a floor 13, but people who try to reach it go missing. It belongs to a vampire named Lamort.
288	288	"Ghulami"	Akshay Anand, Prashant Bhatt, Akshay Singh, Seema Shetty	TBA
289	289	"Wajood"	Nivedita Bhattacharya, Roshni Achreja, Rekha Rao, Deepan Vartak	TBA
A girl lives two lives: when she sleeps, she wakes up as Smita, and when Smita sleeps, she wakes up as Deepa. She later discovers that Deepa is a character played by Smita in a movie.
290	290	"Glass Case"	Nagesh Bhonsle, Falguni Parikh, Reshma Polekar, Milind Gawali, Surbhi Banzara, Yashodhan Rana	TBA
A girl’s hand is found during an excavation in a deserted area. It has not decomposed after six years and helps reveal her killer.
291	291	"Faceless"	Ananya Khare, Karan Shah, Rajesh Khera, Deepak Dutta	TBA
An attacker targets a child in his dreams. A saviour must find the attacker in the child’s dream before it is too late.
292	292	"Kal, Aaj Aur Kal"	Nagesh Bhonsle, Tom Alter, Chitra Kopikar	TBA
Two criminals force a scientist to use a time machine to visit their past. One criminal uses it to travel to his future, complicating matters.

=== Season 2 (2004–05) ===
No. overall	No. in season	Title	Casting	Original release date
286	1	"13 Miles (Part 1)"	Deepshikha Nagpal	19 November 2004
287	2	"13 Miles (Concluding part)"	Deepshikha Nagpal	26 November 2004
A family takes a deserted road called 13 Miles and faces consequences.
288	3	"Confession (Part 1)"	Kabir Sadanand, Chetanya Adib, Rajendra Chawla	3 December 2004
289	4	"Confession (Concluding part)"	Kabir Sadanand, Chetanya Adib, Rajendra Chawla	10 December 2004
A man is frantically pacing up and down and believes that he cannot be the person who ends up taking his own wife's life.
290	5	"Water Demons (Part 1)"	TBA	17 December 2004
291	6	"Water Demons (Concluding part)"	TBA	24 December 2004
A girl is out in the woods and claims to hear noises that are not audible to anyone else but to a mysterious old man.
292	7	"Confession of a Donor (Part 1)"	Bhairavi Raichura, Tushar Dalvi, Sheela Sharma	31 December 2004
293	8	"Confession of a Donor (Concluding part)"	Bhairavi Raichura, Tushar Dalvi, Sheela Sharma	7 January 2005
A couple visits the hospital and asks a lady to reveal herself as she claimed to give in her blood for donation. However, upon revealing herself, the couple is dubious since she does not have eyes.
294	9	"Highway Inn (Part 1)"	Sudhanshu Pandey, Nazneen Patel, Prithvi Zutshi	14 January 2005
295	10	"Highway Inn (Concluding part)"	Sudhanshu Pandey, Nazneen Patel, Prithvi Zutshi	21 January 2005
A man gets stuck when he enters a haunted restaurant. His friend comes in looking for him but gets stuck among the ghost-ly waiters.
296	11	"He Who Writes a Chain Letter Dies (Part 1)"	TBA	28 January 2005
297	12	"He Who Writes a Chain Letter Dies (Concluding part)"	TBA	4 February 2005
Few friends have gone to a resort and are having fun. A bunch decides to prank their friend, but the prank doesn't end well.
298	13	"The Return (Part 1)"	Manish Raisinghan, Anant Jog	11 February 2005
299	14	"The Return (Concluding part)"	Manish Raisinghan, Anant Jog	18 February 2005
A mother and a father find about their son who has been lost for many years. But the way he comes in front of them shocks them so much that they all get scared of him.
300	15	"Living With a Knife (Part 1)"	Ansha Sayed	25 February 2005
301	16	"Living With a Knife (Concluding part)"	Ansha Sayed	4 March 2005
A play takes a sudden turn when the host takes it too seriously and ends up hurting an actor. 22 years later she returns to a haunted mansion.
302	17	"Bride (Part 1)"	Milind Gunaji, Resham Tipnis	11 March 2005
303	18	"Bride (Concluding part)"	Milind Gunaji, Resham Tipnis	18 March 2005
A bride and a groom are about to get wedded just when a mysterious storm comes and tries to stop their wedding.
304	19	"The Haunted House (Part 1)"	Moon Banerrjee, Mihir Mishra	25 March 2005
305	20	"The Haunted House (Concluding part)"	Moon Banerrjee, Mihir Mishra	1 April 2005
A girl gets a possessed house from the broker. She is unaware of the evil that is residing in the house and what will happen with her.
306	21	"The Prank (Part 1)"	Sanjeet Bedi, Narendra Gupta	8 April 2005
307	22	"The Prank (Concluding part)"	Sanjeet Bedi, Narendra Gupta	15 April 2005
308	23	"The Hunger (Part 1)"	Kiran Karmarkar, Simple Kaul, Harsh Vashisht	22 April 2005
309	24	"The Hunger (Concluding part)"	Kiran Karmarkar, Simple Kaul, Harsh Vashisht	29 April 2005
310	25	"Daheshat (Part 1)"	Urmila Matondkar	20 May 2005
311	26	"Daheshat (Concluding part)"	TBA	27 May 2005
A crew decides to shoot at a haunted house for their upcoming shoot and have lots of fun and parties in the same location. But what they don't know is, trouble awaits them in the mansion.
312	27	"The Mysterious Morphing (Part 1)"	Jasveer Kaur	3 June 2005
313	28	"The Mysterious Morphing (Concluding part)"	Jasveer Kaur	10 June 2005

=== Season 3 (2007) ===
No. overall	No. in season	Title	Casting	Original release date
314	1	"Haunted Mansion"	Anushka Singh, Simple Kaul, Parineeta Borthakur, Karan Oberoi	6 January 2007
A group of contractors give a final warning to the owner of the Haveli to vacant the Haveli as they want to construct a highway but unfortunately, one of the contractors gets killed by an evil spirit.
315	2	"Mirror"	Mansi Parekh, Jasveer Kaur	13 January 2007
A group of friends is trying to call the spirits who reside in a different worlds. Mili's friends give a challenge to her to speak evil mantras in the mirror which is situated in her bathroom.
316	3	"Game"	TBA	20 January 2007
Dr. Sanket gets a case for the postmortem of a corpse and sends it to the mortuary. Meanwhile, a few college students, Abhi, and his friends arrive at the mortuary for an experiment. They try to invite a spirit into a corpse's body.
317	4	"Anniversary"	Tarun Khanna	3 February 2007
Deepesh and Priyanka are out on a vacation to celebrate their wedding anniversary. At the hotel, Deepesh has a hallucination of a spirit of a woman and is terrified.
318	5	"Return of the Ghost"	TBA	10 February 2007
After learning that his deceased mother has given all her money to his sister Sarika and his brother Apoorva, Sushant calls upon the spirit of his mother to find out the reason.
319	6	"Possession"	Chhavi Mittal, Neha Marda, Pankaj Berry	17 February 2007
Ashutosh and his 2 daughters, Komal and Natasha visit Rajeshwar's house to spend some quality time with each other. Komal brings some flowers from a tree to her room and is possessed by a spirit which resides in it.
320	7	"Timmy"	TBA	24 February 2007
Disha, who works at a modeling agency gets a strange visitor at her work. He informs her that an anonymous owner has bequeathed his bungalow to her. After the possession of the bungalow, Disha has visions of a child.
321	8	"Documentary"	TBA	3 March 2007
Manav and his friends plan to shoot a documentary for their college. They plan to shoot it in a mansion known to their lecturer, Vishaka. She warns them that there are rumors about the house being haunted.
322	9	"Room No 105"	TBA	10 March 2007
Karthik and his group are ragging juniors in the auditorium. A student fails to perform in front of his seniors so he is given a task where he has to visit Room No. 105 and take Anita's autograph. The room happens to be the room of a dead girl.
323	10	"Puppets"	Murli Sharma, Vijay Bhatia	17 March 2007
A puppet comes alive and tries to stab Mukul with a knife. He tries to tell Arihant, his boss, but no one believes him. Ajit, the caretaker of the puppets, is behind the puppets’ antics. Later, Ajit himself dresses like a puppet and tries to kill people.
324	11	"M.M.S."	Karishma Randhawa, Faisal Raza Khan	24 March 2007
Neeraj, who is supposed to marry Shweta, has Shweta killed. Samira, comes across a picture of them together and receives an MMS of Shweta's murder.
325	12	"Scarecrow"	Sanjay Mitra, Manini Mishra, Nimisha Vakharia	31 March 2007
Vickina performs black magic to get Christine and Ryan into trouble. She brings the scarecrow alive, and Ryan sees her doing this.
326	13	"Shrunken Head"	Shaleen Bhanot, Parikshit Sahni, Neelu Kohli	7 April 2007
An old fakir gives Ankur the model of a shrunken head and tells him that this head would grant him all his wishes. Despite being warned, Mayank takes the head home. Ankur asks the shrunken head for 25 lakh rupees to pay off his father's mortgage. He dies in an accident but his family receives the money from his life insurance. Ankur's father wishes his son to return to life which results in him returning as a zombie. Ankur's wife and mother wish for him to be dead again using the shrunken head. This episode is a direct copy from W. W. Jacobs' story The Monkey's Paw. Instead of a monkey's paw, it is substituted as a shrunken head. This episode is similar to Aahat season 1, episodes 36 and 37 titled "The Wish".
327	14	"Cupboard"	TBA	14 April 2007
Ira and Vikrant throw a house warming party at their new home, but strange things start to happen to their guests. The dead man haunting the house asks Ira for help.
328	15	"Hospital"	TBA	21 April 2007
Shalini has recurring nightmares about the things that happened at Sukh Shanti hospital. Incidentally, her firm has taken up the project of restarting this hospital. In these nightmares, she sees her grandfather, a doctor in the hospital, being tortured by another doctor. This episode is inspired by the 1999 film House on Haunted Hill.
329	16	"Vampire"	Manasi Varma, Prithvi Zutshi	28 April 2007
A vampire attacks a police officer who was on night duty. Amit has a new neighbour. Amit enters in his neighbour's house without her permission. Amit shocked to see a vampire.
330	17	"Laseeka"	Karishma Tanna, Amit Behl	5 May 2007
While returning from Laseeka’s home, three men encounter a strange creature which kills one of them. All of this happens due to a curse on their family.
331	18	"House of Bodies"	Deepshikha, Adita Wahi, Nimai Bali	12 May 2007
A pizza delivery boy is attacked by a witch. Kamya tries to talk to her father who is missing for fifteen years. Kamya is not aware of Arjun's aunt who is a witch.
332	19	"Hotel"	Vaishnavi Mahant	26 May 2007
Mihir brings his wife and child to Hotel Rina Bella, in order to get inspiration for a ghost story. Soon, Adi, Mihir’s son starts to see people who were earlier killed in the hotel, which makes the caretaker of the hotel worry that the spirits haunting the hotel will return to haunt the place once more. This episode is inspired by The Shining.
333	20	"Lizard"	Mona Vasu	2 June 2007
A killer lizard takes the lives of anyone it encounters. A new bride goes to the home of Vishal and the lizard falls on her as she enters the home.
334	21	"Planchette"	TBA	9 June 2007
A group of boys take a huge risk by calling Atharva's spirit as all of them wanted to know the secret behind Atharva's death.

=== Season 4 (2009–10) ===
No. overall	No. in season	Title	Original release date
335	1	"The Train of the Dead Part I ^{^}"	13 November 2009
In order to escape her home, Reena ends up at an unknown railway station called 'Blara Junction'.
336	2	"The Train of the Dead Part II"	14 November 2009
A woman boards a train that leads her to a scary world. Three investigators are called to know what the train is all about.
337	3	"Scarecrow Part I"	20 November 2009
A girl gets locked inside the elevator while working late in office and gets killed by the spirit haunting the elevator.
338	4	"Scarecrow Part II"	21 November 2009
339	5	"The Evil Handshake Part I"	27 November 2009
Pritam meets his long-lost friend Sharath in a mall and shakes his hand. Sharath seems disturbed. Pritam, subsequently, falls ill and dies after giving a statement about a mysterious Italian lady that only he can see on his palm.
340	6	"The Evil Handshake Part II"	28 November 2009
341	7	"The Headless Man Part I"	4 December 2009
A dead body comes into a morgue, but something is wrong with it. The ward boys are afraid to touch it and scurry away.
342	8	"The Headless Man Part II"	5 December 2009
343	9	"Trapped in a Reality Show Part I"	11 December 2009
Five couples receive an invitation to spend a night in a haunted house for a reality show, with the house being the prize for the winner. All the men in the house are being attacked by a mysterious woman in their dreams.
344	10	"Trapped in a Reality Show Part II"	12 December 2009
345	11	"Return of the Dead People Part I"	18 December 2009
A few of the families living in the Rose Valley Society are hiding a big secret. In a strange phenomenon, dead people are rising from the graves and returning to their respective families.
346	12	"Return of the Dead People Part II"	19 December 2009
347	13	"The Burning Man Part I"	25 December 2009
A series of strange and horrific events sees Nishant, Sofi, and Mayank burnt to death by a mysterious man, who makes sure that these people are killed in front of their family members.
348	14	"The Burning Man Part II"	26 December 2009
349	15	"Death Wish Part I"	1 January 2010
After learning about a treasure map, Manish finds a hidden place of worship where every wish is fulfilled. After wishing for money and prosperity, Manish asks for the death of Pratik and Selena.
350	16	"Death Wish Part II"	2 January 2010
351	17	"The Dead Wedding Part I"	8 January 2010
Harsh was unconscious for three days. When he re-gains his consciousness he finds himself in an unknown house.
352	18	"The Dead Wedding Part II"	9 January 2010
353	19	"The Creature in the Forest Part I"	15 January 2010
Malini hears music in the forest and gets attracted towards it. She comes across a hooded person and runs away immediately.
354	20	"The Creature in the Forest Part II"	16 January 2010
355	21	"The Haunting of Clowns Part I"	22 January 2010
A couple challenge each other to watch scary movies, and when the girl, Manisha is left alone, she starts to have visions of clowns around her.
356	22	"The Haunting of Clowns Part II"	23 January 2010
357	23	"Thirteen 'O' Clock Part I"	29 January 2010
A couple goes into an antiques shop and is fascinated by a grandfather clock that has 13 hours instead of 12. Just as the thirteenth hour strikes, the shopkeeper runs away, claiming it is his lunch time.
358	24	"Thirteen 'O' Clock Part II"	30 January 2010
359	25	"Stolen Hearts Part I"	5 February 2010
A female ghost kills Rajiv by pulling his heart out of his chest.
360	26	"Stolen Hearts Part II"	6 February 2010
361	27	"Terror Part I ^{^}"	12 February 2010
Rajesh comes back home to his wife and accuses his wife of putting spiders in his body. A spider comes out of his eyes and he ends up unconscious.
362	28	"Terror Part II"	13 February 2010
363	29	"The Call Centre Part I"	19 February 2010
Vinny takes up a job in a call center and strange things start to happen to her. Out of desperation at her mother being ill and to be able to afford her treatment, Aashi goes for an interview to the same place. Aashi realizes that the call centre is haunted and tries to run away.
364	30	"The Call Centre Part II"	20 February 2010
365	31	"The Lake of Horrors Part I"	26 February 2010
While paragliding, Mohit has an accident and falls into the lake below him. His friends rush to find him and see that he is nowhere to be found.
366	32	"The Lake of Horrors Part II"	27 February 2010
367	33	"The Ancient Prison Part I"	5 March 2010
Harsh and his team reach the ancient prison to investigate it, as there are rumors about the reasons why it had been shut, before being reopened suddenly.
368	34	"The Ancient Prison Part II"	6 March 2010
369	35	"The Mummified Werewolf Part I"	12 March 2010
A few medical students get to observe a mummy. They find out that this mummy has half the body of a woman and the head of a wolf.
370	36	"The Mummified Werewolf Part II"	13 March 2010
371	37	"Naina Studios Part I"	19 March 2010
The manager of a theatre goes back into the theatre late at night to look for his cell phone. The next morning, his dead body is discovered by the staff. A reel from another studio, called Naina Studios is discovered near the body.
372	38	"Naina Studios Part II"	20 March 2010
373	39	"Bheemganj Part I"	26 March 2010
A movie director starts to shoot his movie at Bheemganj Haveli. Harsh and his team are supposed to be at the same mansion to shoot an evil spirit there. One of the actresses decides to go for a late night stroll after hearing some strange sounds.
374	40	"Bheemganj Part II"	27 March 2010
375	41	"The Magical Cloth Shop Part I"	2 April 2010
A woman buys a piece of fabric that shines and decides to make the show stopper dress with it. Every single person that wears this dress ends up getting possessed and committing horrible crimes.
376	42	"The Magical Cloth Shop Part II"	3 April 2010
577	43	"The Phone Call Part I"	9 April 2010
Owners of a farmhouse receive a mysterious phone call. The voice on the phone call tells the owners to leave the house. The phone calls threatening them come from a spirit haunting the phone.
378	44	"The Phone Call Part II"	10 April 2010
379	45	"Hotel of Horrors Part I"	16 April 2010
A man goes to a hotel with his wounded cousin, in search of a suite room. He is visiting to get his sister cured at a nearby hospital. When the girl is alone, she hears some strange sounds.
380	46	"Hotel of Horrors Part II"	17 April 2010
381	47	"New Neighbours Part I"	23 April 2010
Mohit gets killed by a car with no driver in it.
382	48	"New Neighbours Part II"	24 April 2010
383	49	"Newsroom Haunting Part I"	30 April 2010
Two girls, Disha and Shobha start working at a newspaper. Disha comes across an old printing machine and is surprised to see that it works and that it starts printing words on its own.
384	50	"Newsroom Haunting Part II"	1 May 2010
385	51	"Vampires Part I"	7 May 2010
Vanshika visits Jaswant in the middle of the night to tell him that his sister, Meghna is no longer on this planet. She brings Meghna’s two daughters to stay with Jaswant. Vanshika is actually a blood sucking demon.
386	52	"Vampires Part II"	8 May 2010
387	53	"The Doll Part I"	14 May 2010
A family shifts their house in order to escape from a spirit, but she follows them to their new house. Upon hearing some noises, Mayank goes to explore and ends up dead.
388	54	"The Doll Part II"	15 May 2010
389	55	"Radio Part I"	21 May 2010
A late night radio jockey who hosts a horror talk show gets a call from someone claiming to be a spirit.
390	56	"Radio Part II"	22 May 2010
391	57	"The Number Game Part I"	28 May 2010
Sagarika starts to get nightmares in the form of premonitions about killings. This disrupts her sleep. She starts seeing a count down, which tells her that she is about to be possessed.
392	58	"The Number Game Part II"	29 May 2010
393	59	"The Haunted Bus Part I"	4 June 2010
A man informs Rahul about a bus which he can catch. He follows the man and sees a long queue for the bus. However, when the bus arrives, no one gets on it except Rahul.
394	60	"The Haunted Bus Part II"	5 June 2010
395	61	"Cartoon Part I"	11 June 2010
Goncha is famous for his sketch of a superhero name Zingaro. However, Sanjay and Rajan keep bullying him over this character. Strangely, both Sanjay and Rajan are murdered by a mysterious figure, who looks like Zingaro himself.
396	62	"Cartoon Part II"	12 June 2010
397	63	"The Wrong Spirit Part I"	18 June 2010
A month after her husband had passed away from a road accident, Sujata tries to bring her husband to life by bringing a dead body in her house. Although the dead body comes to life, it is not her husband's spirit.
398	64	"The Wrong Spirit Part II"	19 June 2010
399	65	"Post Office Part I ^{^}"	25 June 2010
A letter falls in front of a man in an old post office, and it keeps glowing. Curious about it, he tries to open the envelope to see the letter inside it. However, as soon as he opens the envelope, things start to go wrong.
400	66	"Post Office Part II"	26 June 2010

^{^} Denotes crossover with CID

=== Season 5 (2010) ===
No. overall	No. in season	Title	Original release date
401	1	"The Box Part I"	28 June 2010
A man is seen convincing people to bring a precious diamond box from a dreaded haveli and in return he promises to pay them 20 lakh for the work.
402	2	"The Box Part II"	29 June 2010
403	3	"Shadows Part I"	30 June 2010
Rajeev introduces his fiancee, Prachi, to his colleagues in the party. Later, all the guests are shocked to see a clown who arrives to the party and starts singing. Prachi is particularly upset and rushes upstairs, where she suddenly starts to see shadows on the walls.
404	4	"Shadows Part II"	1 July 2010
405	5	"Video Game Part I"	5 July 2010
An employee, Raju, working in Vicky's gaming zone informs Vicky that weird and scary voices are coming from the video game and Vicky fumes in anger as he had warned Raju not allow anyone to play that scary game.
406	6	"Video Game Part II"	6 July 2010
407	7	"Jogger’s Nightmare Part I"	7 July 2010
A girl jogging in the night at a park is told by the caretaker that she cannot leave through the main gate after 9 pm. The girl is forced to go towards the back gate, which opens towards the Shanti Sadan Housing Society Apartments and in her haste to leave, she falls and injures herself in the dark.
408	8	"Jogger’s Nightmare Part II"	8 July 2010
409	9	"Missing Body in Morgue Part I"	12 July 2010
Subham is asked by his senior to conduct a second post-mortem on Lalit, who was initially diagnosed to have died due to a heart attack. However, Lalit's body disappears from the morgue.
410	10	"Missing Body in Morgue Part II"	13 July 2010
411	11	"Anklet Bells Part I"	14 July 2010
On their way to a resort, Paromita, Raghav, Priti, and Pushkar are forced to take shelter in an old bungalow due to heavy rain. However, things start to go south quickly as their driver Madan and Raghav are killed by the spirit of a woman named Marlene.
412	12	"Anklet Bells Part II"	15 July 2010
413	13	"Magician's Revenge Part I"	19 July 2010
During one of his shows, magician Vikrant lifts a person from the audience in the air. However, he fails to bring him down as the person disappears in front of everyone.
414	14	"Magician's Revenge Part II"	20 July 2010
415	15	"Love Part I"	21 July 2010
Raj meets Shalini for the first time in his office, but the meeting ends in Shalini telling him that his ex-girlfriend Tanya, who died in an accident, wants to speak to him.
616	16	"Love Part II"	22 July 2010
417	17	"Haunted Waterfall Part I"	26 July 2010
Shashi, Anusha, Kajal, and Rohan are in search of their friend Joy, who has gone missing at a waterfall. Despite being warned by a mysterious man, they explore the waterfall and stumble upon a cave inside it.
418	18	"Haunted Waterfall Part II"	27 July 2010
419	19	"Forgotten Father Part I"	28 July 2010
Arun, Nayna, and their adopted son Om return to their ancestral home, however, their joy is short-lived as Om is haunted by the spirit of a mysterious man.
420	20	"Forgotten Father Part II"	29 July 2010
421	21	"Experiment Gone Wrong Part I"	2 August 2010
On a rare night when the Mars come so close to the earth that two sun appears in the sky, Paban, a scientist, decides to conduct a dangerous experiment. However, the experiment goes wrong as the rays convert Paban into a monster.
422	22	"Experiment Gone Wrong Part II"	3 August 2010
423	23	"Room"	4 August 2010
424	24	"Werewolf Part I"	5 August 2010
Upon coming across a mysterious death in which the head of the man killed goes missing, a few local men decide to investigate the matter. They see some footsteps that resemble footsteps of an animal.
425	25	"Werewolf Part II"	9 August 2010
426	26	"Asylum Part I"	10 August 2010
Renuka has recurring nightmares about killing her own family while she is at the mental hospital. She sees her family members coming back to haunt her.
427	27	"Asylum Part II"	11 August 2010
428	28	"Haunted Well Part I"	12 August 2010
The caretaker of a mansion discovers some strange liquid and finds that the source of this is the well. He sees a bleeding hand rise from the well. The man falls into the well and dies.
429	29	"Haunted Well Part II"	16 August 2010
430	30	"Antique Shop Part I"	17 August 2010
A girl working late in the office starts to see and hear things. She goes into a washroom to wash her face but doesn’t see that there is an ‘out-of-order’ sign on the door of the washroom. She sees a witch haunting the washroom.
431	31	"Antique Shop Part II"	18 August 2010
432	32	"Excavation Site Part I"	19 August 2010
A security guard rushes to tell Shruti to stop work on the excavation site as soon as she can as it was a graveyard earlier. While walking, she comes across a tomb in which she sees the dead body of a famous actress.
433	33	"Excavation Site Part II"	23 August 2010
434	34	"Photo Part I"	24 August 2010
Sanjeev falls to his death from the top floor due to an evil spirit, and it seems like he has jumped and committed suicide. A friend of Sanjeev’s, Sameer starts to hear a girl crying every night.
435	35	"Photo Part II"	25 August 2010
436	36	"Coffee Shop Part I"	26 August 2010
Anyone who drinks coffee at a coffee shop ends up getting haunted by the things they fear the most.
437	37	"Coffee Shop Part II"	30 August 2010
438	38	"Bride Part I"	1 September 2010
A bride, in the form of a spirit kills grooms and collects their hands and keeps them all in a suitcase.
439	39	"Bride Part II"	2 September 2010
440	40	"Guest"	3 September 2010
441	41	"Cursed Sunglasses Part I"	6 September 2010
When Gaurav tries on the sunglasses which he picks them from a road, he starts to see some dead bodies following him.
442	42	"Cursed Sunglasses Part II"	7 September 2010
443	43	"Puppeteer Part I"	8 September 2010
Gagan has a party at his home. Suddenly, a puppeteer arrives, and no one knows who invited the puppeteer. In the middle of the puppet show, the puppeteer disappears, only to return later at night and kill Gagan.
444	44	"Puppeteer Part II"	9 September 2010
445	45	"Satan Worship Part I"	13 September 2010
A group of friends sit and tell each other ghost stories. In the midst of this, an uninvited guest arrives and the entire group sends that boy away.
446	46	"Satan Worship Part II"	14 September 2010
447	47	"Gong Part I"	15 September 2010
While wrestling, Ranga has a vision of himself getting stabbed to death. He leaves the wrestling match in a panic. Later, when he is doing his duties as a watchman, he hears the sound of a gong, that scares him.
448	48	"Gong Part II"	16 September 2010
449	49	"Game of Death Part I"	20 September 2010
Mani and Simi come across an old building and decide to rest there for a while. Mani loses track of Simi and then comes across a man with an axe slashed through his head. All of this is actually the trailer for a horror reality show, in which a few celebrities would be taking part. These celebrities have to spend ten days in that haunted building. Things start happening to make their stay at the mansion difficult and scary.
450	50	"Game of Death Part II"	21 September 2010
451	51	"Game of Death Part III"	22 September 2010
452	52	"Game of Death Part IV"	23 September 2010
453	53	"Game of Death Part V"	24 September 2010
454	54	"Game of Death Part VI"	28 September 2010
455	55	"Game of Death Part VII"	29 September 2010
456	56	"Game of Death Part VIII"	30 September 2010
457	57	"Game of Death Part IX"	4 October 2010
458	58	"Game of Death Part X"	5 October 2010
459	59	"Game of Death Part XI"	6 October 2010
460	60	"Game of Death Part XII"	7 October 2010
461	61	"Game of Death Part XIII"	11 October 2010
462	62	"Game of Death Part XIV"	12 October 2010
463	63	"Game of Death Part XV"	13 October 2010
464	64	"Game of Death Part XVI"	14 October 2010
465	65	"Full Moon Night Part I"	18 October 2010
Radhika returns to Mumbai and is having coffee with her friend, when her past begins to haunt her. She goes out many times to see the moon.
466	66	"Full Moon Night Part II"	19 October 2010
467	67	"Wife Part I"	20 October 2010
Aakash and his girlfriend make a plan to get rid of Tara, Aakash’s wife. He suspects that Tara has gotten to know about the plan. Later that night, he starts to have some hallucinations.
468	68	"Wife Part II"	21 October 2010
469	69	"A Flat Part I"	25 October 2010
Alok moves into a new house, where all the neighbours and the watchmen know him. He is really confused as he has never been there before. Later that night, he sees a few spirits at the home and decides to move out immediately.
470	70	"A Flat Part II"	26 October 2010
471	71	"Mysterious Neighbour Part I"	27 October 2010
A couple moves into a new house, and really late at night, a man comes knocking at their door in search of some help as his wife is ill and dying. He wishes to be driven to the hospital. While going there, they encounter a bulldozer being driven on its own, without any driver.
472	72	"Mysterious Neighbour Part II"	28 October 2010
473	73	"Stories Part I"	15 November 2010
Joy is given a task to go and deal with some spirits at Dewan Mansion, to write a book on it. The author tells him that if he survives one night in the mansion, he can be a published author. A lot of spirits keep trying to kill him throughout the night.
474	74	"Stories Part II"	16 November 2010
475	75	"Revenge of the Child Spirit Part I"	22 November 2010
Kumar has decided to spend the rest of his days in his old mansion, where he watched his children grow up. Late at night, the spirit of a child comes and injures him.
476	76	"Revenge of the Child Spirit Part II"	23 November 2010
477	77	"Jealousy Part I"	24 November 2010
Ananya gets a promotion at work, even though another girl, Priya was supposed to get the promotion. This makes Priya very jealous and her boss asks her to be careful.
478	78	"Jealousy Part II"	25 November 2010

=== Season 6 (2015) ===
No. overall	No. in season	Title	Original release date
479	1	"Haunted House"	18 February 2015
The story is about an obsessed woman ending her life while longing for her child. She returns as a ghost after she happens to see a child similar to hers.
480	2	"Mysterious Story"	19 February 2015
A girl visits a haunted jungle and captures with her camcorder. She finds a girl crying in bushes and on reaching, the girl being a ghost stabs her with an axe to death.
481	3	"Bell"	25 February 2015
A family travels through a rustic village road to sell their property land when their son, Nishant. He sees a bell tower and asks his father, Sameer to halt by bell tower.
482	4	"Cupboard"	26 February 2015
A girl named Renu cries inside a cupboard asking for help in a warehouse and she is killed inside the cupboard.
483	5	"The Fatal Prank"	4 March 2015
A group of senior boys rag junior students and also force them to bring a bucket full of water from the well located in the middle of the jungle.
484	6	"Doomed Hotel"	5 March 2015
Mr & Mrs. Sinha take a halt in Grand Palace Hotel LTC but they didn't have any clue what was going to come their way. They are offered to live in LTC's special Honeymoon suite. A worst incident occurs with them.
485	7	"Spa"	11 March 2015
Dev, his wife, Neha and their friend Sarika talk about their romantic life. Sarika's husband, Mehul romances with another girl named Dolly in a spa where she is a massager. Evil spirit kills Mehul while he is bathing.
486	8	"Possessed Shoes"	12 March 2015
Suresh visits graveyard in the midnight along with his best friend Pakya to have fun. Pakya is scared of ghost and also insists Suresh to leave the graveyard at the earliest. Pakya gets possessed by an evil spirit.
487	9	"Destination Wedding"	18 March 2015
Janvi wakes up from a bad dream and reveals to one of her friend Kimi that Priya has returned.
488	10	"Return"	19 March 2015
Vikrant a navy officer who went through tribulations in the ship is scared to reveal the truth to his family.
489	11	"Journey"	23 March 2015
Monica a college student gets vanished in the bus. Later, another 2 students Ana and Sunny get killed in the bus.
490	12	"The Emperor"	24 March 2015
Neha is possessed by Rohit's evil spirit.
491	13	"Pay Back Time"	25 March 2015
A couple recently shifts to a new house where the wife discovers a secret room.
492	14	"A Maid's Rage"	26 March 2015
Maid Ketki is eveytime followed by her kid's spirit. Savita gets killed by that kid.
493	15	"Silence"	30 March 2015
Danish reveals to Gayatri that even after death he can listen to Seema's voice and also requests her to help him out.
494	16	"Ship"	31 March 2015
Maya and Sangram are dressed in bridal attire for their engagement. Sangram discovers that his house is floating in high tides of sea and a huge ship attacks his house.
495	17	"Haunt"	1 April 2015
A couple arrives in the empty house to spend a romantic evening but their romantic evening turns out to be a worst nightmare for both of them as they come across a piano.
496	18	"Hospital"	2 April 2015
Hospital’s Trusty Shalaka wants to make some changes in the interiors of her hospital but hospital’s Dean requests Mr. Vinayak and Shalaka not to reconstruct Wing A.
497	19	"Avenging Leela's Demise"	6 April 2015
It's a special episode of Sunny Leone. During a dance number shoot, Laila encounters a spirit.
498	20	"The Search"	7 April 2015
Sonu and Kalyani go missing. Sonu's Parents are trying all possible ways to search their only Son Sonu. Sonu and Kalyani have returned to their revenge.
499	21	"Promise"	8 April 2015
The story revolves around a child named Shanky. He dies and returns as his spirit and wants to take Khushi with him.
500	22	"Mysterious Women"	9 April 2015
Preeti aunty asks servant, Bobby to take food upstairs for Elesh. Bobby sees the ghastly face of Elesh and Elesh kills him. Preeti says that Reshi should not open the box. On the way, in a jerk, the box opens.
501	23	"Anklet Bells"	13 April 2015
Madhulika's evil spirit returns to take her revenge with four friends.
502	24	"Imaginary Friend"	14 April 2015
Anju reveals a shocking truth to her husband Rajesh. Rohan's Aaya Sheela senses an evil spirit. Sheela lands in deep trouble.
503	25	"Haunted Jungle"	15 April 2015
A group of friends enter in the dense forest to find out Vendigo. They are killed. A new forest officer is posted in the jungle so he arrives with his wife. Spirits of those group of friends warn him to leave the jungle at the earliest.
504	26	"Haunted Anniversary"	16 April 2015
A group of paranormal documenters goes to the infamous Keshavgarh haweli to cover the story behind the haunted haweli. A restricted portion of the haweli is known for the wailing sounds of the last princess who died 7 years back.
505	27	"Haunted Train"	20 April 2015
Aman is talking to his younger brother, Rohan on phone, when he hears sound of bangles and discovers a girl in bridal avatar crying at a railway station.
506	28	"The Bloody Game"	21 April 2015
The story is all about Ouija board, which is a board game to communicate with dead spirits.
507	29	"Possessed Receptionist"	22 April 2015
There is something mysterious about the perfume which changes introvert geeky looking Sonia into a bold, confident but rude and evil.
508	30	"The Selfish Witch"	23 April 2015
Some farmers are promised to be relocated. These farmers and their family members are killed and buried in the same plot of land. For vengeance, these farmers return and use the crops grown in those fields by opening a restaurant called 'Devil's Kitchen'.
509	31	"Possessed Mother"	27 April 2015
A family of four shifts into a new penthouse flat that they have got for a low price. Their happiness subsides when they are unable to hire a maid for the housework, since they are spooked away by the house. Gradually, we see scary instances which makes us realise that the house is haunted.
510	32	"Mirror"	28 April 2015
Story starts with Hina bringing an antique mirror in her home which starts showing the premonition of death of the person. Soon Hina ruined her life and that ghost in the mirror makes captive her daughter and tells to help her to take her revenge.
511	33	"Possessed Doll"	29 April 2015
Sakshi loses her parents in a car accident. Sakshi finds a doll one day in a toy shop. She gets emotionally attached to the doll and shares all her feeling with it. The doll kills the maid who tries to separate Sakshi from the doll.
512	34	"Telephone Strangler"	30 April 2015
Manan wants to postpone his second marriage with Pragati, as he saw his ex wife who was missing for 4 years. But when his best friend and Pragati's brother Gaurav tells him that all this is his illusion, so Manan decides to go ahead with his decision of marrying Pragati.
513	35	"Hide and Seek"	4 May 2015
The story is about a resort which is haunted by a spirit of Miya, and whosoever visits this resort, is being possessed by the spirit of Miya who plays an hide and seek game with the guest and kills them between 3am to 5am.
514	36	"Photo"	5 May 2015
Deepak, an ace photo journalist, was working on the nexus between some government employees and the big builders of the city. During his investigation, he caught Shashi taking bribe from Lokesh, Rana, Sanju and Vineet for signing the illegal approval for some apartments. Knowing this, all of them killed Deepak and buried him.
515	37	"Ancient Mask"	6 May 2015
The story revolves around a mask, in which a person's spirit resides in it. Whosoever makes fun of the mask, that person is killed by that mask.
516	38	"Unknown Danger"	7 May 2015
Priya and her son Sooraj came for leg therapy in Mumbai. Sooraj wants to give surprise to his father Rahul, who had gone out for business meeting. Both Priya and Sooraj find malicious paranormal activities in their house. Priya gets panic and calls Rahul to come as soon as possible. Rahul is the person who loved Sneha and murdered her.
517	39	"Beauty Potion I"	11 May 2015
A witch named Amaara fulfils the wish of anyone but with that wish she asks for returns. A couple Vishal and Sheena went with their wish of killing their wealthy, ugly and hunchback brother Ratan for property. Hence in return she wants Vishal's wife, Sheena.
518	40	"The Real Identity II"	12 May 2015
Ratan has now discovered that he has to drink the blood of a pretty girl every 24 hrs and he shifts to Mumbai and changes his name to Malhaar.
519	41	"Sunshine Villa I"	13 May 2015
Jay and Rohini, a couple, go for honeymoon to a place called Sunshine Villa. Jay receives a phone call, who tells him that she is her real Rohini and Rohini who is in the Villa is not his real Rohini, and asks him to leave that place, otherwise Rohini who is in the Villa will kill him.
520	42	"Sunshine Villa II"	14 May 2015
Naman thinks that Maya's spirit who appears as Kamya to him is real Kamya. The real Kamya gets trapped in that Villa and Naman brings fake Kamya to his home.
521	43	"Possessed Kids"	18 May 2015
Teena, the new caretaker meets with Manisha, the same girl warden. Teena sees a restricted area and asks Manisha about that restricted area. She says that that restricted area is not safe place for human beings as the two kids Rishi and Swati inside that restricted area have a special disease.
522	44	"The End is Near"	19 May 2015
A family of three, shifts to a new city, and they are troubled by a curse of the past. Unknown to them, they are haunted by an old spirit who is intent on killing the daughter before she turns 21.
523	45	"Cry of a Women"	20 May 2015
A newly wed horror novelist, Anupama researchs on a ponds mysterious story about haunting, which used to happen specially at Karva Chauth night. Eventually, she gets possessed and happy family of her, starts getting into trouble. She kills her mother in Law Shanti and husband Vijay.
524	46	"Painting"	21 May 2015
After Sanjana's suicide, Neha, her sister moves in to the same house with her common friend Akshay. Akshay finds something unusual with the painting hung on Sanjana's bedroom wall.
525	47	"Demon on a Mission"	25 May 2015
A worst incident occurs with Bollywood actress superstar Menka. Menka's driver Shyam gets killed.
526	48	"A Plot"	26 May 2015
Sangeeta comes to her friend Vinata and husband home. They also have a son Rahul. They shift to a new place which his bos had given him. That house is not got kind of scary. Sangeeta don't feel good and she realise that a boy is there and that's not Rahul, that's a different boy little scary she feels scared and she walks away.
527	49	"Printing Press"	27 May 2015
Two crusaders got together and tried to close the newspaper by burning down the press, unknowingly killing the three owners in the process. Now, they are out to get their revenge against their perpetrators and their families.
528	50	"Hoba Goba"	28 May 2015
Jyoti`s father wrongly accused a person, whose kid was about to die saying the man is trying to kill the kid. People gather and start beating that man and in that situation both father and son die. Later on, the dead father`s spirit becomes a boogyman, who kidnaps kids and kill them.
529	51	"Possessed Daughter"	1 June 2015
Young Namrata is accompanied by her sisters who take her to a surprise venue for her birthday celebration. Namrata gets possessed by a spirit who breaks hell into her family, killing all their loved ones.
530	52	"The Mysterious Clock"	2 June 2015
A couple and their friend get stuck in an unknown route due to vehicle breakdown. They find an old mansion nearby and decide to stop over and ask for help. Further, they find out that the mansion is haunted with an elderly couple protecting a room full of clocks.
531	53	"The Mysterious Necklace"	3 June 2015
The plot begins with Arun's dad who is killed by the curse of the hunter's necklace he is wearing. After that incident, the necklace is auctioned and sold off without disclosing the fact that the curse passes on with it.
532	54	"Pizza"	4 June 2015
The story begins with a usual pizza order on call by a small kid to a haunted and devastated mansion. The order is received by Chhotu, who was reported missing many years ago. The pizza is used as a weapon to kill the occupants of the house.
533	55	"Mobile"	8 June 2015
A young girl named Shivani faces the worst, when she watches a video of a girl getting burnt alive during a fire accident. As the video comes to an end, Shivani is asked to forward the video in order to avoid death, but Shivani does not do so.
534	56	"Night College"	9 June 2015
Gagan is pleased as he is praised for his great work of building a fabulous modern day college. But Gagan gets a huge shock when he is met by his fears as a ghost attacks him. Gagan tries his best to escape but ends up dead.
535	57	"Haunted Vacation Home"	10 June 2015
Sanjana, Riya and Puja rent a new house that earlier belonged to a scientist who is now dead. As soon as Sanjana enters the house, she comes face to face with the ghosts that haunt the house.
536	58	"Haunted Bride"	11 June 2015
Jay marries Malvika and brings her home after completing all the rituals. On the very first night of the marriage itself, Mavika is possessed by a ghost who appears in the form of a young girl named Chhutki.
537	59	"Scarecrow"	15 June 2015
A man wakes up during the dark hours when he hears his wife screaming. He goes to her room to quiet her but when he returns, he is horrified to see his room filled with dry grass. He later finds a scarecrow outside his house.
538	60	"Betrayal"	16 June 2015
Priyanka is about to leave in the car, but the car starts to behave in a strange manner. Horrified by this sight, Priyanka screams for help and a horrific looking man turns up with a stick in his hand and kills Priyanka mercilessly.
539	61	"Window"	17 June 2015
The episode deals with an apartment that has been haunted by a spirit hungry for revenge. In her determination to have her revenge this spirit does not let anyone occupy the apartment and whosoever dares to enter the apartment, either faces death or the spirit itself.
540	62	"Haunted Office"	18 June 2015
The episode deals with a haunted office where a spirit takes the cover of the human body and enters into the office.
541	63	"Room"	22 June 2015
Deepa, Pooja and Rohini shift to a new house and Rohini distributes the rooms amongst the girls. Pooja gets the room with a locked store room that the girls were warned against opening. That night, Pooja hears strange noises from the store room and she finally decides to open the store room when she finds a key in the drawer of her room.
542	64	"The Wedding Gift"	23 June 2015
As Aakash and Sonia are on their way to celebrate their anniversary, the two of them mysteriously meet with a sudden accident. Sonia gains consciousness from the accident and finds a woman standing in front of the car. Sonia walks towards the woman and faints when she sees her burnt face.
543	65	"The Mysterious Lights"	29 June 2015
On a fateful night as Ketan enters his house, he meets his end after he sees a woman clad in a nightgown, roaming around the house. Shruti rushes to the room from where she hears strange noises and is horrified when she finds her father hanging dead.
544	66	"Painting"	30 June 2015
Kavita wakes up when she hears the sound of a kettle in the kitchen. Kavita gets shocked but is further horrified when the painting in her room comes to life. Kavita loses her life.
545	67	"Punishment"	6 July 2015
Anuj along with his family has come to spend some leisure time in his company’s guest house. The haunted guested house is being painted and it looks amazing. The painters who were giving this lavish guest house a makeover, die last night and their blood stain is clearly visible on the wall.
546	68	"Memories"	7 July 2015
Alisha gets shocked when she hears the sound of a young boy asking for help. She moves towards the direction of the voice and ends up in a jungle.
547	69	"29 February 2011"	13 July 2015
Kavita is a struggling model but she got a break and was leaving her house early morning to reach studios on time. In the meantime, Kavita’s mom requested her to postpone the shooting for one day. As 29th of February is not considered an auspicious day to start a new work.
548	70	"Selfie"	14 July 2015
Karishma and Bobby were to get married in few days, but Bobby met an accident and has died. His fiancé Karishma is left broken and is finding difficult to overcome the situation. Just after Bobby’s last rite, one of his friend receives a text message from Bobby’s mobile.
549	71	"Room No. 343"	20 July 2015
Soniya becomes the top model by featuring on the cover page of an immensely popular magazine. On knowing this, her husband celebrates the occasion by raising a toast in his photo studio. However; it is then, the evil spirits starts haunting Soniya and makes her life hell.
550	72	"Bedeviled Red Book"	21 July 2015
A famous poet named, Anshuman is surprised when a book that is a compilation of love poems, arrives at his house. After seeing the book, Anshuman throws away the book as he realizes that it is written by a girl, who has been after him for a long while. He however, faces the worst when the book comes to life and kills him brutally.
551	73	"The Patient"	27 July 2015
Story begins with scary eyes of evil spirits haunting a woman in the parking area. The site is so evil that it frightens the woman on seeing the red blooded eyes of the ghosts. Furthermore, the evil spirit even follows Alia and keep haunting her as well.
552	74	"Haunted Wedding"	28 July 2015
Vipul is a young man, who loves adventure but this time his passion to explore new places turns fatal for his friends.
553	75	"The Runaway Couple"	3 August 2015
Manu and Jenny elope from their house to marry each other. It is Manu, who is accompanied by his friend Rohit. In their midway, they stop to spend their night in a lodge. However; the caretaker of the isolated lodge, strictly asks the guests not to talk with unknown persons around the property.
554	76	"Joker"	4 August 2015
The episode is about a joker, whose two girls die in a road accident on their birthday. When the joker learns of it, he dies from the shock. Due to his distress, he returns as a soul and kidnaps somebody else two girls and takes the souls from their bodies so that he can make their birthday.
