= Parchhaiyan =

Parchhaiyan may refer to:

- Parchhaiyan (film), a 1972 Indian Hindi-language drama film by Sharankumar Chand, starring Vinod Khanna and Bindu
- Parchhaiyan (Indian TV series), a 2002 Hindi language drama-series
- Parchaiyan (Pakistani TV series), an Urdu language Pakistani television series

== See also ==
- Parchhain, 1952 Indian Hindi-language drama film by V. Shantaram
