= Achint Kaur =

Indian television and film actress

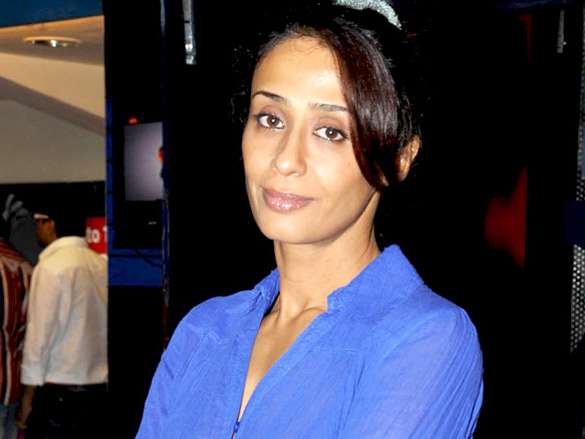
- Born: 5 September 1970 (age 56); Meerut, Uttar Pradesh, India
- Occupation: Actress
- Years active: 1994–present

Achint Kaur is an Indian actress who works in Hindi films and television, particularly known for her roles as Mandira and Pallavi in Ekta Kapoor's soap operas, Kyunki Saas Bhi Kabhi Bahu Thi and Kahaani Ghar Ghar Kii, respectively. She also voiced the character Shenzi in the Hindi version of The Lion King. She portrayed the roles of a mother and a mother-in-law in the TV series Jamai Raja.

== Early life ==
Achint Kaur was born and raised in Meerut, Uttar Pradesh, into a Punjabi Sikh family. She studied at Sophia Girls' School.

== Career ==
Achint started her career with Zee TV's popular show Banegi Apni Baat in 1994 and worked in Swabhimaan in 1995 in which she played the role of 'Soha'.

Besides working in some of the popular drama series, she has also played many roles in Bollywood movies, such as Om Jai Jagadish, Corporate, & Julie. She has also won numerous awards for her strong character driven roles. These include the ITA Award for "Best Actress in Supporting Role" for her series Virrudh. As of 2014 she is working in Zee TV's Punjabi/Gujarati theme serial Jamai Raja (2014 TV series).

She is a theatre actress and recently appeared in the play Two to Tango, Three to Jive. Kaur has also acted in a few Pakistani television serials.

== Filmography ==
List of Achnit Kaur film credits
Year	Title	Role	Notes
2002	Om Jai Jagadish	Tanya Malhotra	
2002	Sur – The Melody of Life	Pooja	
2004	Julie		
2006	Corporate	Chhaya V. Seghal	
2008	Anamika	Vishaka Pratap Rajput	
2009	Three: Love, Lies, Betrayal	Officer Smith	
2010	Guzaarish	News Reader	
2011	Haunted – 3D	Margaret Malini	
2011	Jo Hum Chahein	Amrita Singhania	
2012	Heroine	Mahis therapist	
2012	Riwayat	Deepika Desai	
2014	2 States	Shipra Mehra	
2014	Roar: Tigers of the Sundarbans	Forest Warden	
2015	Black Home		
2015	Guddu Rangeela		
2016	Zorawar	Major Zorawar Singh's Mother	
2019	The Lion King (Hindi Version)	Shenzi	Voiceover
2019	Kalank	Saroj	
2019	The Tashkent Files	Mrs. Natarajan	
2019	Chopsticks	Zacharia	Netflix film
2021	Koi Jaane Na	Kabir's Friend	Amazon Prime Video film
2024	Ghudchadi	Sunita	JioCinema film
2026	Do Deewane Seher Mein	Mandy	

== Television ==
List of Achnit Kaur television credits
Year	Show	Role	Notes
1994	Banegi Apni Baat		
1995–1997	Swabhimaan	Soha	
1997–1998	Aahat	Mansi / Holy Ghost / Naina	(Episode 96 & 97 The Tresspasser), (Episode 110 & 111 Jungle), (Episode 148 & 149 The scarecrow)
1998–2001	Saaya	Kamiya	
1991–2002	Maan	Sanjana Maan	
2001	Talaash		Episode 46
2002	Parchhaiyan	Archana	
2002	Dhadkan	Mallika Sareen	
2002–2003	Kittie Party	Pixie	
2003–2008	Kyunki Saas Bhi Kabhi Bahu Thi	Dr. Mandira Kapadia / Priyanka Dutta / Mandira Kiran Virani / Mandira Aditya Gujral	
2004–2005	Piya Ka Ghar	Amba	
2005–2008	Kahaani Ghar Ghar Kii	Pallavi Bhandari / Pallavi Kamal Agarwal / Pammi Balraj Nanda	
2006	Piya Kay Ghar Jana Hai		Pakistani TV serial
2006–2008	Karam Apnaa Apnaa	Nikhila Mahen Kapoor	
2007–2008	Virrudh	Vedika Rai Singhania	Won:ITA Award for Best Supporting Actress
2008–2009	Ranbir Rano	Preet Behenji	
2011	Jhansi Ki Rani	Ladai Sarkar / Queen of Orchha	
2014–2016	Jamai Raja	Durga Devi "DD" Patel	
2017–2019	The Good Karma Hospital	Mala Pradeep	7 episodes
2019–2020	Jamai 2.0	Durga Devi "DD" Patel	Web series on Zee5
2025–2026	Binddii	Bharati Khanna	
2025	Ganesh Kartikey	Diti	
2026	Kyunki Saas Bhi Kabhi Bahu Thi 2	Dr. Mandira Kapadia Sanghvi	
