= Shreechand Makhija =

Indian film and television actor (born 1940)

- Born: 20 March 1940 (age 86); Shikarpur, Sindh
- Occupation: Actor
- Years active: 1975–present
- Known for: Nukkad

Shreechand Makhija (born 20 March 1940) (also spelt as Srichand Makhija) is an Indian film and television actor. He has appeared in a number of serials as well as films and is prominently known for his role of Chaurasia in the Indian sitcom Nukkad on Doordarshan. He has done many types of roles. His last film is Zindagi Tumse (2019).

== Childhood and Education ==
Shreechand Makheja was born on 20 March 1940 in Shikarpur, Sindh, British India (now Pakistan). After the partition in 1947, his family left Sindh and permanently relocated in India. He graduated in Commerce in 1961 and served in the Accounts Department of Ministry of Labour. He retired in 1998.

== Filmography ==
Year	Film	Role	Notes
1989	Eeshwar	House Servant	
1989	Anjaane Rishte		
1989	Maine Pyar Kiya	Prabhakar Makhija (Prabhu)	
1990	College Girl	Sinha, Minister's Secretary	
1992	Chamatkar	College Principal	
1998	China Gate (1998 film)	Local Villager	
2005	Apaharan	Bucchi Kaka	

=== Television ===
Year	Serial	Role	Channel	Notes
1986	Nukkad	Chaurasia (Paanwala)	DD National	Again Retelecasted as Naya Nukkad in 1993
1988	Bharat Ek Khoj	Mahadaji Scindia	DD National	Episode 40 Tipu Sultan
1993	Filmi Chakkar	Yash Ghai	Zee Tv	Episode 33 Guest Role
1993	Byomkesh Bakshi (TV series)	Professor Nepal Gupta and Manik Mehta	DD National	(Chiriya Ghar Part 1 & 2 and Pahari Rahasya)
1994	Tehkikaat	Malhotra, Hotel manager	DD National	Episode no 1,2,3 Jealousy Turn Blood
1995	Aahat Season 1 1995-2001	Episode 39/40 The Hijack, Episode 66/67 Anamika	Sony Entertainment Television	
1998	Saaya	College Principal	Sony Entertainment Television	

== See also ==
- List of Indian film actors
- List of Indian television actors
