= Firdaus Dadi =

Indian actress

- Occupation: Actress
- Years active: 1992–2012

Firdaus Dadi is an Indian actress. She made her acting debut in the 1992 film Tahalka and then moved into television, making her debut in the show Banegi Apni Baat (1994). She went on to appear in many shows throughout the 1990s and early 2000s including Parampara, Imtihaan, and Aahat. After a break she returned to television with the serial, Aane Wala Pal.

== Filmography ==
Year	Film	Role
1992	Tahalka	Dolly / Rolly

== Television ==
Year	Title	Role
1993–1997	Banegi Apni Baat	Riya
1994–1997	Grihalakshmi Ka Jinn	
1995	Aahat	
1995	Imtihaan	Pooja
2001	Aane Wala Pal	
2002	Astitva...Ek Prem Kahani	Rashmi Mathur
2003	C.I.D.	
2005	Zara Si Zindagi	
	Gopaljee	Sonia
	Sansar	
2010–2011	Bandini	Doctor Megha
