= Deepak Dewoolkar =

Indian television actor

Deepak Deulkar, is a TV serial actor in India. He is famous for his role of Balrama in the TV series Krishna.

== Early life ==
He started playing cricket when he was at Siddarth college, Fort. Deulkar was a successful spinner and played for the Mumbai Under-19 team. An injury to his finger left him unable to play for a prolonged period of time, which led to his being dropped from the team. After graduating college, he chose to try the entertainment industry. He became famous for his character of Mahadev Thakur, in the ETV Marathi serial Lek Ladki Ya Gharchi. He was also the script writer of the movie Saad. He was famous for his role in many TV serials like Krishna (where he played Balarama), Sapane Sajan Ke, Ye Risha Kya... and Lek Ladaki Hya Gharachi, which are the best examples of his popularity as a TV star.

Deepak Deulkar is married to Nishigandha Wad. They have one daughter, Ishwari.

== Filmography ==
Lead role in Some of Commercial Hit Marathi Films:

- Vaat Pahte Punvechi (Bal Joglekar)
- JanmaDaata (V. N. Mayekar)
- Maza Saubhagya (N. S. Vaidya)
- Dhani Kunkawacha (N. Relekar)
- Sasar Maher (Jayashree Gadkar)
- Sarnradhni (Viju Patel)
- Topi Var Topi (N. Relekar)
- Pratidav (Vilas Rakte)
- Navra Majya Muthit Ga (R. K. Mehta)
- Sasar Maze Bhagyache (Abu Bhai)
- Paath Rakhin (Ganesh Jadhav)
- Ladhai (Viju Patel)
- Shanti Ne Keli Kranti Tuch (N. Relekar)
- Mazi Bhagyalaxmi (Pitamber Kale)
- Saakhar Puda (N. S. Vaidya)
- Mangal Sutra (Bhaskar J. adhav)
- Saunsar Chakra (Ganesh Jadhav)
- Mith Bhakar (Afzal Bhagwan)

Lead role in Selective Hindi Serials:

- Krishna as Balrama on DD National. Director: Ramanand Sagar
- Panthar on Home TV. Director - Gautam Adhikari
- Aparajita on DDNational. Director - Alok Nath Dixit
- Saath Saath on Zee TV. Director - Prashant Chothani
- Mukkaddar on DDNational. Director - Ashish Patil
- BadIa on DDNational. Director - Mohan Kaul
- Tehkikaat on Star TV Star. Director - Karan Razdan
- Raaz on Star TV. Director - Karan Razdan
- X Zone on Zee TV. Director - Shahab Shamshi
- Saturday Suspense on Zee TV. Director - Shahab Shamshi
- Aahat on Sony. Director - BP. Singh
- Morarji on DDNational. Director Devendra Khandelwal
- C.I.D. on Sony. Director - B. P. Singh
- Sapne Saajan Ke on DDNational. Director- Alok Nath Dixit
- Jahan Pe Basera Ho on Star Plus. Director - Naresh Malhotra
- Yeh Rishta Kya Kehlata Hai on Star Plus. Director - Rajan Shahi

Lead role in Marathi Serials:

- Damini on Doordarshan. Director - Kanchan Adhikari
- Album on Zee Marathi. Director- Ajeet Kumar
- Bandini on Doordarshan. Director - Gautam Adhikari / Ashish Patil
- Lek Ladki Hya Gharchi on Etv Marathi. Director - Mahesh Tagde
- Tuzh Vin Sakhya Re on Star Pravah. Director Mahesh Tagde / Raju Sawant
- Sawar Re on Etv Marathi. Director Ajay Mayekar

Lead role in Marathi Drama / Play:

- Lagna. Director - KamlakarSarang, writer- Jaywant Dalvi
- Kaal Chakra. Director - Damu Kenkre, Writer - Jaywant Dalvi
- Saudamini. Director - Arun Nalawde, Writer - Shekhar Patil
