= Banegi Apni Baat =

Indian television drama (1993–1997)

- Directed by: Tony Singh; Sunil Prasad
- Starring: see below
- Opening theme: "Banegi Apni Baat" by Vanraj Bhatia
- Country of origin: India
- No. of episodes: 312

Production
- Producers: Tony Singh; Deeya Singh
- Running time: 22 minutes
- Production company: DJ's a Creative Unit

Original release
- Network: Zee TV
- Release: 1993 – 1997

Banegi Apni Baat is an Indian television drama series that aired on Zee TV from 1993 to 1997. The series was produced by Tony Singh and Deeya Singh. It starred many Indian television actors, such as Irrfan Khan, Roshini Achreja, Shefali Shah, Firdaus Dadi, Sadiya Siddiqui, Anita Kanwal, Divya Seth, Achint Kaur, Rishabh, Varun Badola, Rakhee Tandon, Rituraj Singh and R. Madhavan.

The focus of the series was college life, flirtation, romance, and the campus. The transition from college to professional life was shown for most of the characters. Simultaneously, contemporary business life was also showcased. The series was initially going to run for 52 episodes, starting late July 1993. India Today compared the series to Beverly Hills 90210.

== Cast ==
- Ikhlaq Khan as Som Khanna, Mr Seth's rival architect
- Surekha Sikri as Radha Shourie
- Irrfan Khan as Kumar Sharma, Revati's husband
- Kalpana Iyer as Revati Sharma, fashion designer
- Aman Khanna as Rajat
- Shalini Suri as Shikha Rai
- R. Madhavan as Ashley Alexander
- Roshini Achreja as Ritu, Radha's daughter, later Vikram Sharma's wife
- Joan David/Shefali Chhaya as Richa, Radha's daughter
- Firdaus Dadi as Riya, Radha's daughter, Ashley Alexander's love interest and wife in last episode
- Arun Bali as Mr Seth
- Raman Trikha as Rahul Seth
- Sadiya Siddiqui as Priyanka Khanna, Rahul's wife and priyam's mother, Kabir's friend
- Anita Kanwal as Amrita Seth
- Alyy Khan as Kabir, a lawyer fighting Priyanka's case against Amrita
- Achint Kaur as Anushka, Karan's sister
- Divya Seth as Nikita Seth
- Vikram Kapadia as D.K. Khanna
- Girish Malik as Karan Nagpal, Richa's husband
- Varun Badola as Ayushman
- Rakhee Tandon as Shradha
- Rituraj Singh as Vikram (Vicky) Sharma, Revati & Kumar's son
- Vipul Jagota as Duddoo
- Kurush Deboo as E.T.
- Sandhya Mridul as Sakshi
- Ashok Lokhande as Sabkale
- Vipul Jagota as Dedoo
- Seema Pandey as tutor in last episode
- Vaquar Sheikh as Siddharth, Anushka's love interest
- Manav Kaul
