= Imtihaan (TV series) =

- Directed by: Imtiaz Ali
- Starring: See below
- Music by: Ajit Varman
- Opening theme: Aankhon mein rok le, tu ye aasuon ka toofan. Leti hai zindgaani, har kadam pe ek Imtihaan by Abhijeet
- Original language: Hindi

Production
- Producer: Anupam Kher

Original release
- Network: DD National
- Release: 1995

Imtihaan is an Indian television series broadcast on DD National in 1995. The show was produced by Anupam Kher and later episodes were directed by a then novice Imtiaz Ali.

The cast included Alok Nath, Renuka Shahane, Anang Desai, Raju Kher, Firdaus Dadi, Ninad Kamat, Sachin Khedekar, Manoj Bajpayee and others. Character played by Renuka Shahane was later replaced by Pallavi Joshi.

== Cast ==
- Alok Nath
- Renuka Shahane
- Anang Desai
- Raju Kher
- Firdaus Dadi
- Ninad Kamat
- Sachin Khedekar
- Manoj Bajpayee
