= Tahalka =

1992 Indian Hindi-language action adventure film

- Promotional poster
- Directed by: Anil Sharma
- Written by: Anil Sharma
- Produced by: K. C. Sharma
- Starring: Dharmendra; Naseeruddin Shah; Mukesh Khanna; Aditya Pancholi; Javed Jaffrey; Sonu Walia; Ekta Sohini; Shikha Swaroop; Pallavi Joshi; Shammi Kapoor; Amrish Puri
- Music by: Anu Malik
- Release date: 7 August 1992
- Running time: 167 minutes
- Country: India
- Language: Hindi
- Box office: ₹16.25 crore

Tahalka (transl. Furore) is a 1992 Indian Hindi-language action adventure film directed by Anil Sharma, featuring an ensemble cast including Dharmendra, Naseeruddin Shah, Aditya Pancholi, Javed Jaffrey, Shammi Kapoor, Amrish Puri, Mukesh Khanna, Ekta Sohini, Pallavi Joshi, Sonu Walia, Shikha Swaroop, and Firdaus Dadi (in her acting debut). The film was the fifth highest grosser of 1992 and was declared a Hit by Box Office India. This film was loosely based on Hollywood action adventure films The Guns of Navarone and Where Eagles Dare.

== Plot ==
General Dong is the evil dictator of the fictional country, Dongrila. He has kidnapped dozens of school girls and plans to use them as suicide bombers to bomb populated areas in India. He even puts some girls into his personal harem, pushing the remaining ones into prostitution and using them for illegal organ trade. He also carried out the assassination of the chief of the Indian Army, General Sinha. One day, while out for a seaside trip with his daughter, Major Krishna Rao, an officer in the Indian Army, happens to notice an island with his daughter and they find a schoolgirl escaping someone.

They try to take her on the boat, but she dies. After leaving Dolly with his trusted servant, Major Rao creeps forward and sees Dong ordering his men to do away with those kids. He calls Dong a clown and other names, and overpowers him, though getting shot in his arm in the process. Making all the girls board the two boats, he takes Dong, tied up on board, but then Dong's men arrive there after abducting Dolly, they manage to free Dong from the chamber. Dong challenges major Rao to come to Dongrila and rescue his daughter within the next year, 12 months from that very day. He chants an eerie verse and cuts off one of Krishna Rao's legs.

After recuperating, Krishna Rao recruits the Indian army officers Captain Ranvir, Captain Rakesh, Captain Javed, Captain Anju and former disgraced Major Dharam Singh, named the group as Force Five. Then he somehow makes Shammi Kapoor, the second senior general and Mr. Iyengar, the committee chairman agree to his plan. They agree on the condition that Krishna' team's victory would be a national victory, but their defeat will be a personal issue. Then Krishna Rao's team starts their journey and they go on a perilous journey between the borders of China and India to rescue Dolly as well as dozens of school girls held in Dong's captivity and destroy Dong's kingdom of Dongrila.

While the Force Five leaves, Brigadier Kapoor is seen betraying them by informing their locations to Capt. Synthia, who works for General Dong. Allah Rakha catches Kapoor red-handed and reprimands him severely. He expresses his regret that an Indian himself is selling the nation to the enemies. While Allah Rakha tries to finish Kapoor, the latter deceitfully shoots him with a pistol through his blazer pocket and kills him, thus wiping out the first crucial witness.

In their journey, they are helped by Jenny, wife of Dongrila's ex-army chief Mr D'Costa, Prince Couv and Julie. It so happens that in the big city hospital, Major Rao contracts gangrene in his left leg and needs to be operated on. But Dong's men surround the hospital and shooting begins. They even cut off the electrical supply so the team decides to obtain a generator from the base room. Rakesh says that they will have to capture the whole area after killing all these soldiers. Just then Krishna comes there and says that they've already endangered the mission. He asks them to escape by going down a valley that Anju discovered on the other side of the hospital. Dharam Singh says that he will complete the mission here itself and asks major Rao to behave like a commander. But Major Rao chooses him as the next commander and makes him promise to lead the team for making the mission a success. All of them start climbing down the valley as Major Rao gathers all the guns and starts fighting alone. As the team reaches the foot of the valley, Dong's men blast the hospital acting by his orders and by sheer misfortune, Major Rao loses his life in fighting the Dong's Army.

Another blow strikes when Julie's brother captain Jello kills the little son of Mrs. D'costa as he catches the child spying on them. It is revealed that the little boy was helping Prince Couv. It is found out that Julie is an informer of Dong's Captain Cynthia. Her identity is disclosed and she is killed by Captain Ranvir. Then, in retaliation, Dong gives execution orders for Cynthia. But, Cynthia is saved by Javed and Rakesh, who is then offered to switch sides. Then, they all attack Dong in the Annual Day of Dongrila and kill him. But former, lastly, in flight Brigadier Kapoor points guns to kill the team and reveals himself as an informer of Dong. But, he is cleverly killed by Major Dharam Singh in the similar way Brigadier Kapoor killed Allah Rakha earlier, saying the famous dialogue of the movie The Good, the Bad and the Ugly, "If you want to shoot, shoot, don't talk."

== Cast ==
- Dharmendra as Major Dharam Singh
- Naseeruddin Shah as Captain Ranveer
- Mukesh Khanna as Major Krishna Rao
- Aditya Pancholi as Captain Rakesh
- Javed Jaffrey as Captain Javed
- Sonu Walia as Jenny D'Costa
- Ekta Sohini as Captain Anju Sinha
- Pallavi Joshi as Julie Cynthia’s Spy
- Shikha Swaroop as Intelligence Chief Cynthia
- Prem Chopra as Prince Kow
- Gulshan Grover as Allah Rakha
- Shammi Kapoor as Brigadier Kapoor
- Amrish Puri as General Dong
- Sudhir as Dong's Right Hand
- Tom Alter as Dong's Army Captain
- Bob Christo as Dong's Army Captain Richard
- Dan Dhanoa as Jelu
- Jack Gaud as Dong's Henchman
- Anirudh Agarwal as Dong's Henchman
- Guddi Maruti as Salma
- Rajendra Nath as Lifeguard at swimming pool
- Dilip Dhawan as Captain Wilson D'Costa
- Parikshat Sahni as General Sinha
- Firdaus Dadi as Dolly
- Ram Sethi as Laural
- Sudha Chandran as Seema in a special appearance
- R. S. Mallik (Gorilla) as Dong's Henchman
- Sudesh Mahaan as Army General

== Soundtrack ==
Tahalka

Film score by Anu Malik
- Genre: Feature film soundtrack
- Length: 51:33
- Label: T-Series

The soundtrack composed by Anu Malik, with lyrics by Santosh Anand, Hasrat Jaipuri, and Anu Malik himself. The album blends romantic melodies, dramatic themes, and energetic dance numbers, contributing significantly to the film's appeal. The album's diverse range of songs showcases Anu Malik's versatility in blending various musical styles to enhance the film's narrative. According to the Indian trade website Box Office India, with around 1,500,000 units sold the soundtrack became the thirteen highest-selling album of the year.

No.	Song	Singers	Lyrics	Duration
1	"Dil Diwane Ka Dola Dildaar Ke Liye"	Anuradha Paudwal, Anwar, Kumar Sanu Babla Mehta	Santosh Anand	9:28
2	"Meri Chaththri Ke Neeche Aaja"	Mohammed Aziz, Sudesh Bhonsle, Anu Malik	Hasrat Jaipuri	10:45
3	"Dil Diwani Ka Dola Dildaar Ke Liye"	Anuradha Paudwal	Santosh Anand	1:40
4	"Shom Shom Shom"	Amrish Puri	Anu Malik	3:10
5	"Eya Eya O"	Anuradha Paudwal, Anu Malik*Sonu Walia in movie	Santosh Anand	8:35
6	"Aap Ka Chehra, Aap Ka Jalwa"	Kavita Krishnamurthy, Mohammed Aziz	Hasrat Jaipuri	8:00
7	"Garam Dharam Aji Kaisi Sharam"	Anu Malik, Abhijeet Bhattacharya	Hasrat Jaipuri	8:58
