= Parchhaiyan (Indian TV series) =

- Genre: Drama
- Directed by: Ravi Rai; Rajendra Mehra
- Starring: See below
- Country of origin: India
- Original language: Hindi
- No. of seasons: 1

Production
- Camera setup: Multi-camera
- Running time: Approx. 24 minutes

Original release
- Network: Sahara TV
- Release: 29 July 2002

Parchhaiyan is an Indian television series that aired on Sahara TV. The series starred known television actors Achint Kaur and Milind Gunaji.

== Cast ==
- Achint Kaur as Archana
- Milind Gunaji as Abhay
