= Aahat (Indian TV series) =

Indian horror television series

- Genre: Thriller; Horror; Supernatural
- Created by: B. P. Singh
- Written by: Yash and Sima Shridhar Raghavan Sriram Raghavan
- Directed by: B. P. Singh; Santram Varma; Siba Mishra; Ishwar Singh; Nitesh Singh; Sriram Raghavan
- Creative director: Mayank Vohra
- Composer: Raju Singh
- Country of origin: India
- Original language: Hindi
- No. of seasons: 6
- No. of episodes: 554 (list of episodes)

Production
- Executive producers: Chandan Rajput; Rajendra B. Patil
- Producers: B. P. Singh; Pradeep Uppoor
- Production locations: Mumbai, India
- Cinematography: Neelaabh Kaul; J S Mangal; Madhu S Rao
- Running time: 42 minutes approximately
- Production companies: Neo Films Associates (season 1); Akshaya Productions (season 1); Fireworks Productions (season 2–6)

Original release
- Network: Sony Entertainment Television
- Release: 12 October 1995 – 4 August 2015

Aahat (transl. An approaching sound) is an Indian thriller horror television anthology series created by B. P. Singh for Sony TV. The series premiered on 5 October 1995 on the network. The episodes of first, second and fifth seasons were half-hourly, while episodes of third, fourth and sixth seasons were one-hourly. Om Puri, Mandira Bedi, Tom Alter, Ashutosh Rana, Shivaji Satam, Virendra Saxena, Nivaan Sen, and noted theater personality Satyadev Dubey have starred in the show. Canadian actor, Remi Kaler also worked in the series in 1999 and 2000. The sixth season premiered on 18 February 2015, starring Shakti Anand and ended on 4 August 2015.

== Plot ==
The first season was mostly a crime thriller-whodunit with only occasional episodes on the supernatural. After the first season, each story focused on a different aspect of paranormal activity, such as ghosts, zombies, phantoms, undead persons, possessed objects, evil laughing, and witches and wizards. In season 5, each story has a flashback scene of how the curse and revenge happened.

== Series overview ==
Series	Episodes	Originally released	
Series	Episodes	First released	Last released
1	285	12 October 1995	22 June 2001
2	28	19 November 2004	10 June 2005
3	21	6 January 2007	9 June 2007
4	66	13 November 2009	26 June 2010
5	78	28 June 2010	25 November 2010
6	76	18 February 2015	4 August 2015

=== Season 1 (1995–2001) ===
Aahat was first shot in 1994 as a suspense thriller, and began broadcast on 5 October 1995, each story being split across two episodes. After about 40 episodes with the same theme, one episode with a supernatural theme was made and when audiences for the series rose sharply, it made the switch.

=== Season 2 (2004–2005) ===
Due to the popularity of the first season, Sony TV decided to bring back the series in its second season. The episode format was same as of the first season. This time the season failed to gain TRP ratings.

=== Season 3 (2007) ===
The third season was titled as Aahat: Dahshat Ki Teesri Dastak (English: An approaching sound: The Third Coming of Horror). Each story being shown in a single episode. This time too the season didn't manage to gain TRP ratings and the season was shut down soon.

=== Season 4 (2009–2010) ===
The fourth season was titled Aahat: The All New Series. In the season, Durjan, head of Paranormal And Supernatural Activities Research who used to collect powers from the spirits for his boss sends Harsh (Chaitanya Choudhury), Raghav (Vishal Gandhi) and Yamini (Krystle D'Souza) to cope up with a new supernatural power every week with the story being split into two episodes.

=== Season 5 (2010) ===
To celebrate 15 years of the series, Fireworks Productions created and featured a 16 - episode arc titled "Maut Ka Khel" (English: "The Game of Death") which aired starting 20 September 2010. This was heavily inspired by the 1999 Hollywood horror film House On Haunted Hill. The storyline follows celebrities (Sidharth Shukla, Roshni Chopra, Aashka Goradia, Vivan Bhatena, Gautam Rode, Ketki Dave, Tanaaz Irani, Bakhtiyaar Irani, Aryan Vaid, Bobby Darling, Karishma Tanna, Sanjeet Bedi, Megha Gupta, Pankaj Tripatri, Ishitta Arun and Shahbaz Khan (as the host) ) who joined a reality horror show in which the celebrities live in a 200-year-old haunted house but the show suddenly becomes a trap with real ghosts.

=== Season 6 (2015) ===
The first episode of the sixth installation of the series premiered on 18 February 2015. The first episode of the series had gained a TRP rating of 2.9. But after a couple of weeks, the TRP ratings dropped, and the channel had to shut down the season on 4 August 2015.

== Crossover ==
Aahat had three crossover episodes with the series CID, once on 13 & 14 November 2009; second time on 12 & 13 February 2010 and third time on 25 & 26 June 2010.

== Reception ==
=== Critical response ===
The first five seasons of the series received general acclaim but response for the sixth season was quite mixed. Vineeta Kumar of India TV stated, "As against everybody's expectations, Aahat (season 6) doesn't seem that impressive."

Sweta Kaushal of Hindustan Times stated, "The new episode of Aahat (season 6) does not scare at all and lives up to all the comic cliches that Indian horror shows have been following till date. At best, it is hilarious."

=== Ratings ===
Vineeta Kumar of India TV gave the sixth season 2/5 stars, and further stated, "For all those who would be expecting grand with the elements of horror and spook in it, Aahat has come with a slight disappointment."

Sweta Kaushal of Hindustan Times giving the same ratings to the sixth season, further stated, "The new episode shows women with bad make-up as the ghosts."

=== Awards ===
Fireworks Productions was nominated for Best Continuing TV Programme and for Best Thriller/Horror Show Of The Year of Indian Telly Awards in 2002. Sujit Pattnaik and Tanmoy Ghosh won Indian Television Academy Awards for Best Visual Effects in 2010, while Himanshu, Yogen and Kamal were nominated for the same category of the same award in 2005 and 2012, however, winning in 2011.
