= Legal death =

Recognition under the law that a person is no longer alive

Legal death is the recognition under the law of a particular jurisdiction that a person is no longer alive. In most cases, a doctor's declaration of death (variously called) or the identification of a corpse is a legal requirement for such recognition. A person who has been missing for a sufficiently long period of time (typically at least several years) may be presumed or declared legally dead, usually by a court. When a death has been registered in a civil registry, a death certificate may be issued. Such death certificate may be required in a number of legal situations, such as applying for probate, claiming some benefits, or making an insurance claim.

== Medical declaration ==
Most legal determinations of death in the developed world are made by medical professionals who pronounce death when specific criteria are met. Two categories of legal death are death determined by irreversible cessation of heartbeat (cardiopulmonary death), and death determined by irreversible cessation of functions of the brain (brain death). In the United States, each state has laws for determining these two categories of death that are modeled after the Uniform Determination of Death Act. States that do not recognize "irreversible cessation of all function of the entire brain, including the brainstem" to be death include Arizona, Illinois, Iowa, Louisiana, North Carolina, and Texas.

Cardiopulmonary criteria for death are met when a physician determines that efforts to restart a stopped heart during cardiac arrest are futile, or that no attempt should be made to restart a stopped heart, such as when there is a Do Not Resuscitate (DNR) order. In the latter case, irreversible is understood to mean that heartbeat and breathing cannot return on their own and will not be restored by medical intervention.

Brain death determinations are made in cases where breathing is supported by machines. Brain death is determined by there being no signs of brain function during neurological examination of a person with a beating heart. Confirmatory tests document either no blood flow to the brain, or no brain electrical activity in absence of factors known to produce reversible loss of brain function. Unlike cardiopulmonary death which sometimes involves a decision not to resuscitate the heart, brain death is a determination that the brain biologically cannot be resuscitated.

If a clinically dead person has suffered injuries so severe that resuscitation is obviously impossible, then in some jurisdictions first responders may make a legal determination of cardiopulmonary death. Such a person is said to be dead on arrival (DOA) or dead at the scene.

== Presumption ==
In some cases, a person will be declared dead even without any remains or doctor's declaration. This is under one of two circumstances. First, if a person was known to be in mortal peril when last seen, they can often be declared dead shortly after. Examples would be the passengers of the Titanic that were not rescued after the ship sank. Second, if a person has not been seen for a certain period of time and there has been no evidence that they are alive. The amount of time that has passed varies by jurisdiction, from as little as four years in the US state of Georgia to twenty years in Italy. In the UK, Lord Lucan was declared dead 25 years after he was last seen alive.

== False declarations ==
There are three general categories where people may be falsely declared dead: by mistake, because of fraud, or as punishment for a crime.

=== Mistaken ===
Sometimes people who are declared dead return and are unable to be declared alive. One study estimated that every year, the U.S. Social Security Administration declares 12,200 alive citizens as dead.

Constantin Reliu, a Romanian man living in Turkey, lost contact with his family. His wife had a court declare him dead in 2016, after having no contact with him since July 1999, shortly before a major earthquake in Turkey. His wife assumed that he had died in the earthquake.

In 2013, an Ohio man named Donald E. Miller Jr. who was declared legally dead in 1994 resurfaced and sued to be declared alive. However, the local court declined and ruled he was still legally dead because Ohio state law does not allow reversing legal declarations of death if more than three years have passed.

In 2016, Frenchwoman Jeanne Pouchain was erroneously declared dead by a French court of appeal hearing an employment dispute. The error was upheld in court in 2017. As of 2021, Pouchain was still fighting to be legally recognized as alive.

=== Fraudulent ===
In some cases, a legal declaration of death is fraudulent. Several people have faked their own deaths for various reasons. The most common reasons for this are to collect insurance money, to avoid capture by police or to avoid paying debts.

At times, people declare other people dead for their own benefit. For instance, in India, several people have been falsely and fraudulently declared dead by family members wishing to steal land and other property. The best known is Lal Bihari, who was fraudulently declared dead by family members, and was legally dead between 1975 and 1994. Bihari founded the Association of Dead People to help others in similar situations.

=== Punitive ===
Historically, those who have committed crimes or other wrongs against the state have been declared legally dead despite being obviously alive. This is known as civil death. Such a person loses all rights normally granted to a person. In jurisdictions that practiced civil death, it was legal to kill such a person, since they were not legally recognized as alive anymore, and therefore their killing not considered a murder.

=== Reversals ===
Reversing an incorrect declaration of death can be a time-consuming and difficult process. Whether a victim of fraud or an honest error, it often takes many years to reverse a fraudulent death declaration, and at times it never happens. Bihari didn't get his declaration of death reversed until 1994, 19 years later. Reliu lost a court battle to be declared alive in March of 2018, but the decision was reversed three months later when the courts declared him alive. Donald E. Miller Jr. remains legally dead because the state of Ohio has no legal means for reversing a declaration of death, and Jeanne Pouchain of France was still fighting to be legally recognized as alive in 2021.

== Investigation ==
Determining manner of death often has important legal implications. Governments elect a coroner or appoint a medical examiner, depending on jurisdiction, to both determine manner and cause of death, and if necessary, identify bodies when their identities are unknown. Manner of death is usually classified as natural, accidental, homicide, suicide, pending or undetermined. A soldier is often listed as killed in action if the death was during military service. There are legal implications to all of the classifications. For example, a homicide may be ruled a justifiable homicide.

== Estate ==
In nearly all jurisdictions, dead people do not have the right to own property. When a person dies, their property needs to be distributed to others in a process called probate. People can specify their wishes before they die by preparing a will and testament. If there is no will, the laws of their country determine how the property is distributed. In most cases, it would go to next of kin, such as a spouse or adult child. If the person who died is wealthy, often a portion of their property will be collected by an estate tax.

== Bioethics ==
There are a few controversies surrounding the topic of legal death among health professionals and the general public. The main issues argued amongst bioethicists include but are not limited to; non-heart-beating organ donation, the criteria for determining death for adults versus infants, and whole-brain versus higher-brain versus brainstem death.

=== Non-heart-beating organ donation ===
Non-heart-beating organ donation or NHBD is the procurement of organs after cardiac death. Cardiac death is determined after a patient has suffered cardiac arrest for two to five minutes.

=== Whole-brain vs. higher-brain vs. brainstem criteria ===
Deciding on which criteria to follow for determining brain death is still heavily debated today. Whole-brain criteria are the standard most countries follow including the United States. Under the whole-brain death criteria, all functions of the brain including the brainstem must be ceased. The brainstem criteria differs from the whole-brain formulation, in that only the brainstem function is ceased. The brainstem is responsible for breathing and carrying out somatic regulatory functions.
