= Sangita Ghosh =

Indian television actress (born 1976)

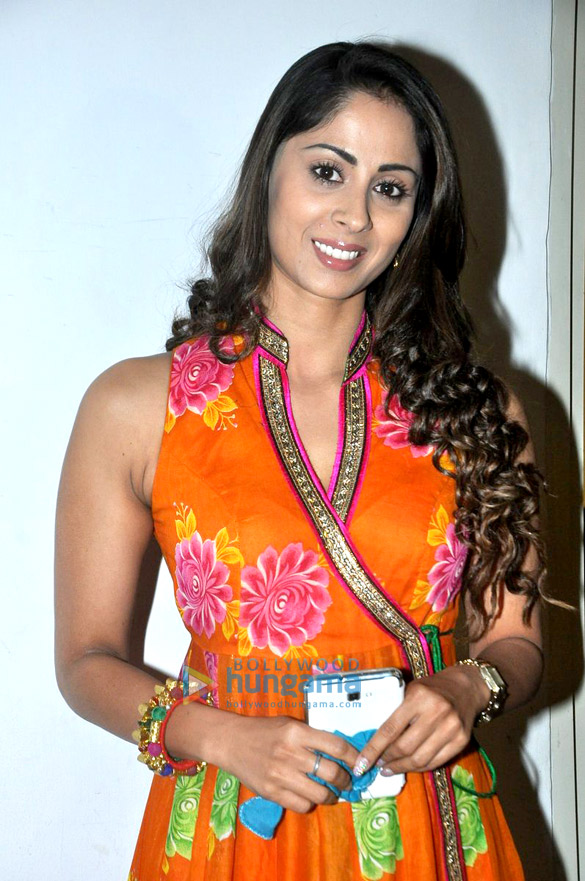
- Ghosh at Mumbai Police and NGO kids function in 2014
- Born: 18 August 1976 (age 50); Shivpuri, Madhya Pradesh, India
- Occupations: Model; actress; dancer; television presenter
- Years active: 1986–present
- Spouse: Shailendra Singh Rathore (m. 2011)
- Children: 1

Sangita Ghosh (born 18 August 1976) is an Indian film and television actress and model. She is better known for her role of Pammi in the television serial Des Mein Niklla Hoga Chand. She has also anchored and hosted several award shows and television series. She anchored the show Nach Baliye with Shabbir Ahluwalia, where she also gave multiple dance performances. She is also known for her role as Pishachini in Divya Drishti.

== Career ==
Ghosh started acting when she was ten years old, in a serial called Hum Hindustani. She has done a lot of modelling for brands like Donear Suitings and Nirma. She finished her college studies in 1996 and acted in serials like "Mehndi Tere Naam Ki" Sansaar (in the early 1990s of Dheeraj Kumar), Kurukshetra, Adhikar, Ajeeb Dastan and Daraar. After Daraar, she was cast in Des Mein Niklla Hoga Chand in which she played the role of Pammi. She portrayed the role of Priyanka Kharbanda / Priyanka Rahul Lamba on popular TV show Viraasat in 2006.

She also participated in the reality dance show Zara Nachke Dikha 2 as the girls' team captain in 2010. Ghosh appeared on a daily soap after a leap of six years i.e. after Viraasat, she made her comeback on the TV show Kehta Hai Dil Jee Le Zara as Sanchi opposite actor Ruslaan Mumtaz on 15 August 2013. The show was praised for its fresh and unique concepts and Ghosh received wider appreciation for her chemistry with Mumtaz. The show ended in mid 2014.

She then appeared in the second season of the daily soap Parvarrish. She also played the antagonist role of Sudha in Star Plus's thriller series Rishton Ka Chakravyuh. In February 2019, she was seen portraying Sachini, the antagonist in the TV show Divya Drishti. Her performance as Sachini received wider appreciation and the show was a commercial success. The show ended after a year long run in February 2020.

From November 2025 to August 2026, she played Gulaab in Colors TV's Tu Juliet Jatt Di.

== Personal life ==
In her early years, Ghosh also studied in Airport High School of Mumbai. Ghosh married polo player Rajvi Shailendra Singh Rathore of Jaipur in a private ceremony in 2011. In July 2022, Ghosh revealed that she and her husband were parents to a daughter, The couple had named their daughter, Devi.

== Filmography ==
=== Films ===
Year	Film	Role	Notes
2008	Rainbow	Herself	Special appearance in a song "Sala Sala Sala"

=== Television ===
Year	Serial	Role	Notes	Co–Star
1986	Hum Hindustani	—		
1995–96	Kurukshetra	—		
1997	Ajeeb Dastan	—		
1997	Saturday Suspense	Dolly / Fake Anita Rana	Episodic role (Episode 11)	
1998	Saturday Suspense	Episode 40	Episodic role	
1998	Saturday Suspense	Episode 90	Episodic role	
1996–1999	Daraar	—		
2000	Khushi	—		
2000	Adhikar	Saba	Supporting role	
2000	Thriller At 10	Advocate Shruti Vikas Malhotra	Episodic role (episodes 141 and 145)	
2000–2001	Rishtey	Jyoti	Episodic role; ("Saal Mubarak" - Episode 42)	
2000–2001	Rishtey	Parul	("Jhoota Sach" - Episode 99 - 6 February 2000)	
2000–2001	Rishtey	Vinati	("Rang" - Episode 151 - 8 March 2001)	
2000–2002	Mehndi Tere Naam Ki	Muskaan Malik	Lead role	Amar Upadhyay; Sanjeev Seth
2001–2005	Des Mein Niklla Hoga Chand	Parminder (Pammi) Singh Kent; Parminder Dev Malik; Parminder Rohan Malhotra	Lead role	Varun Badola; Siddharth Dhawan; Amar Upadhyay
2004–2005	Des Mein Niklla Hoga Chand	Mahi Malik (Gungun)		Ankur Nayyar
2003	Sambhav Asambhav	Maya Siddharth Nath / Meera's reincarnation	Lead role	Shakti Anand
2004	Zameen Se Aassman Tak	—	Lead role	Anand Suryavanshi
2005–2006	Rabba Ishq Na Hove	Veera	Lead role	Varun Badola; Nikhil Arya
2006–2007	Viraasat	Priyanka Kharbanda / Priyanka Rahul Lamba	Lead role	Rohit Roy; Ankur Nayyar
2007	Doli Saja Ke	Aditi Chaitanya Shekhawat	Cameo role	Amit Sarin
2007	Doli Saja Ke	Neha	Negative role	
2013–2014	Kehta Hai Dil Jee Le Zara	Sanchi Prabhu / Sanchi Dhruv Goyal	Lead role	Ruslaan Mumtaz; Vinay Jain
2015–2016	Parvarrish – Season 2	Surinder "Suri" Kulvinder Khurrana	Lead role	Sandeep Baswana
2017–2018	Rishton Ka Chakravyuh	Sudha	Negative role	Ajay Chaudhary
2019–2020	Divya Drishti	Pisachini	Negative role	
2022	Swaran Ghar	Swaran Kanwaljeet Bedi / Swaran Ajeet Lamba	Lead role	Ronit Roy; Ajay Chaudhary; Hiten Tejwani
2022	Swaran Ghar	Chandni	Cameo role	
2024–2025	Saajha Sindoor	Saroj	Negative Role	Nasir Khan
2025–present	Tu Juliet Jatt Di	Gulaab Brar		Digvijay Purohit

=== Reality shows ===
Year	Show	Role	Notes	Ref.
2005	Nach Baliye 1	Host		
2006	Nach Baliye 2	Host		
2010	Zara Nachke Dikha	Contestant	Girls' Team Captain	

=== Web series ===
Year	Show	Role
2019	Bhram	Durga

== Awards ==
=== Won ===
- ITA Award for Best Anchor - Music & Film Based Show
- Indian Television Academy Award for Best Onscreen Couple (2013) - Ruslaan Mumtaz & Sangita Ghosh

=== Nominated ===
- Indian Telly Award for Best Actress in a Lead Role,
- Star Guild Award for Best Actress in a Drama Series
- Indian Telly Award for Best Anchor
