= Lal Bihari =

Indian activist (born 1955)

Lal Bihari Mritak
- Born: Lal Bihari; 6 May 1955 (age 71); Khalilabad, Azamgarh, Uttar Pradesh, India
- Occupations: Farmer, activist, social worker
- Years active: 1980–present
- Known for: Fighting for the rights of people who are wrongfully declared dead, was himself declared dead between 1975 and 1994
- Awards: Ig Nobel Peace Prize Winner, 2003

Lal Bihari (or Lal Bihari Mritak, born 6 May 1955) is an Indian farmer and activist from Amilo, in Azamgarh district, Uttar Pradesh, who, though alive, was officially designated dead between 1975 and 1994. He fought with Indian bureaucracy for 19 years to prove that he was alive. Meanwhile, he added Mritak ("deceased") to his name, and founded Mritak Sangh, the Uttar Pradesh Association of Dead People, to highlight other cases like his.

== Biography ==
Bihari lived in a small village of Uttar Pradesh before becoming a well-known personality. In order to apply for a bank loan, Lal Bihari visited the revenue office at Azamgarh district headquarters to get proof of identity, whereupon he learned that he was officially designated as dead. His uncle had bribed an official to register him as dead, so that he would get the ownership of Bihari's ancestral land at Khalilabad, which measured less than an acre.

Bihari discovered at least 100 other people in similar situations, being officially dead. He formed Mritak Sangh, Uttar Pradesh Association of Dead People, in the Azamgarh district. He and many other members were in danger of being killed by those who had appropriated their property. Currently, the association has over 20,000 members from all over India. By 2004, they had managed to declare four of their members alive.

Over the years, Bihari tried to attract attention to his situation by various means. He organized his own funeral and demanded widow's compensation for his wife. In 1980, he added the word Mritak ('Dead') to his name and signed his letters "late Lal Bihari". He attempted to stand (unsuccessfully) for election against then Prime Minister Rajiv Gandhi in 1989, to prove that he was alive. In 1994, he managed to have his official death annulled after a long legal struggle.

Bihari was awarded the Ig Nobel Peace Award in 2003. In 2004, he ran for a seat in the parliament of Lalganj, Uttar Pradesh.

Bihari continues to support other people in similar situations. In 2004, he sponsored fellow Mritak Sangh member Shivdutt Yadav when he attempted to contest the election against Indian prime minister Atal Bihari Vajpayee.

== In popular culture ==
In 2021, film-maker Satish Kaushik made a movie about his life and "death", titled Kaagaz, produced by Salman Khan and Nishant Kaushik under the banner of Salman Khan Films and The Satish Kaushik Entertainment Production. It stars Pankaj Tripathi along with Monal Gajjar, Mita Vashisht and Amar Upadhyay and was released on ZEE5 on 7 January 2021.

== See also ==
- List of Ig Nobel Prize winners
- The Late Mattia Pascal, Luigi Pirandello's novel about a living man who was officially dead.
