= Amilo, Azamgarh =

Amilo
- Town
- Nickname: Nagar Panchayat Amilo
- Location in Uttar Pradesh, India
- Coordinates: 26°04′39″N 83°18′52″E
- Country: India
- State: Uttar Pradesh
- District: Azamgarh
- Founder: Azam Khan

Population (2001)
  - Total: 21,887

Languages
  - Official: Hindi
- Time zone: UTC+5:30 (IST)
- Postal code: 276404
- Vehicle registration: UP.50

Amilo is a census town in Azamgarh district in the state of Uttar Pradesh, India.

== Demographics ==
As of 2001 India census, Amilo had a population of 21,887. Males constitute 52% of the population and females 48%. Amilo has an average literacy rate of 46%, lower than the national average of 59.5%; with 58% of the males and 42% of females literate. 22% of the population is under six years of age.

== Notable persons ==
It is also home to activist Lal Bihari, who fought with Indian bureaucracy from 1975 to 1994 to prove that he is alive. He added Mritak (deceased) to his name, and founded Mritak Sangh, the Uttar Pradesh Association of Dead People, to highlight other cases like his, for which he won a 2003 Ig Nobel Prize.
