= Dolly Sohi =

Indian television actress (1975–2024)

- Born: 15 September 1975; Amritsar, Punjab, India
- Died: 8 March 2024 (aged 48); Mumbai, Maharashtra, India
- Years active: 2000–2007; 2009; 2012–2024
- Spouse: Avneet Dhanowa (m. 2005; div. 2023)
- Children: 1
- Parents: Daljeet Singh Sohi (father); Baljeet Sohi (mother)
- Relatives: Lal Singh Sohi (brother); Amandeep Sohi (sister)

Dolly Sohi (15 September 1975 – 8 March 2024) was an Indian television actress, known for playing the leads in Bhabhi and Kalash and appearing in Meri Aashiqui Tum Se Hi and Khoob Ladi Mardaani...Jhansi Ki Rani. Born on 15 September 1975, she died from cervical cancer on 8 March 2024, at the age of 48. Her death came only the day after her sister, actress Amandeep Sohi, had died of jaundice.

== Personal life ==
Dolly Sohi married Avneet Dhanowa on 4 March 2005. They had a daughter named Amelia Dhanowa. They separated in 2011 and were divorced in 2023.

== Television ==
Year	Serial	Role	Notes	Co–Star
2000–2003	Kalash	Rano	Lead Role	Amar Upadhyay; Aman Verma
2002	Kammal	Manya Jajoo	Supporting Role	Sachin Shroff
2002	Kkusum	Manasi	Cameo Role	Sandeep Rajora
2002–2006; 2007	Bhabhi	Saroj Tilak Chopra	Lead Role	Manish Goel; Mukul Dev; Rohit Roy; Swapnil Joshi; Mahesh Thakur
2009	Yeh Chanda Kanoon Hai	Pinky Vijay Kalia (Episode 5)	Episodic Role	
2012–2013	Tujh Sang Preet Lagai Sajna	Geetanjali Kedarnath Goenka	Supporting Role	Dinesh Kaushik
2013	Hitler Didi	Noor Khan Chaudhary	Supporting Role	Rohit Roy
2013	Devon Ke Dev...Mahadev	Mahalasa's mother	Supporting Role	
2013–2014	The Adventures Of Hatim	Maharani Shazia	Supporting Role	
2014–2015	Mere Rang Mein Rangne Waali	Sadhana Govind Chaturvedi	Supporting Role	Mahesh Thakur
2014–2015	Jab Jab Bahar Aayee	Kamya	Lead Role	Anand Goradia; Chandan Anand
2015–2016	Meri Aashiqui Tum Se Hi	Rajeshwari	Negative Role	
2016–2017	Kalash – Ek Vishwaas	Janaki Raichand	Supporting Role	
2017	Ek Tha Raja Ek Thi Rani	Sunanda Chauhan	Supporting Role	
2017	Peshwa Bajirao	Maharani Ruhani Chhatrasal Bundela	Supporting Role	Madan Joshi
2017	Aarambh: Kahaani Devsena Ki	Jaldev's mother	Supporting Role	Shahbaaz Khan
2017–2018	Meri Durga	Gayatri "Jassi" Neelkant Ahlawat	Negative Role	Rajeev Kumar
2018	Kumkum Bhagya	Tina's mother	Negative Role	
2019	Khoob Ladi Mardaani – Jhansi Ki Rani	Maharani Saku Krishnarao Newalkar	Negative Role	
2021	Amma Ke Babu Ki Baby	Anuradha Pratap Singh	Supporting Role	Sagar Saini
2021	Kumkum Bhagya	Sushma Tandon	Supporting Role	
2022	Sindoor Ki Keemat	Vidya	Supporting Role	Siraj Mustafa Khan
2022–2023	Parineetii	Gurpreet Jaswant Kakkar	Supporting Role	Kaushal Kapoor
2023	Piya Abhimani	Kiran Yash Sinha	Negative Role	Jairoop Jeevan
2023–2024	Jhanak	Srishti Vinayak Mukherjee	Negative Role	Saurabh Agarwal
