= Sudigadu =

- Film poster
- Directed by: Bhimaneni Srinivasa Rao
- Written by: C. S. Amudhan
- Based on: Tamizh Padam by C. S. Amudhan
- Produced by: T. Chandrasekhar Reddy
- Starring: Allari Naresh; Monal Gajjar
- Cinematography: Vijay Ulaganath
- Edited by: Gautham Raju
- Music by: Sri Vasanth
- Production company: Arundathi Movies
- Release date: 24 August 2012
- Running time: 138 minutes
- Country: India
- Language: Telugu
- Box office: est. ₹22 crore distributors' share

Sudigadu (transl. Lucky man) is a 2012 Indian Telugu-language parody film directed by Bhimaneni Srinivasa Rao and produced by Chandrasekhar D Reddy under Arundathi Movies. It is the remake of C. S. Amudhan's debut Tamil film Tamizh Padam. The film stars Allari Naresh and Monal Gajjar. Allari Naresh plays double roles in this movie as father and son.

The film was released on 24 August 2012 and received positive reviews, which appreciated the cast's comical performances (particularly Naresh), humor, and drama, but criticized the screenplay, unrealistic situations, narration, and Rao's direction. Sudigadu emerged as a major success, grossing over ₹43 crore at the box office with a distributors' share of ₹22 crore. It emerged as the highest-grossing film in Allari Naresh's career.

== Plot ==
Kamesh and his wife become the proud parents of a baby who is born with a six-pack body. Just when the baby is born, Thikkal Reddy comes in as the villain in search of his enemy who runs into Newborn Baby's room. He prays to God to save him and hides in the room. The Newborn Baby does urination for a long time which leads to the death of Thikkal Reddy's elder son, and he becomes a sworn enemy of the baby. To save the baby from Thikkal Reddy, Kamesh gets his mother to escape to Hyderabad. The baby grows up into Siva, a powerful and dynamic young guy with seemingly invincible powers like a Telugu Cinema hero.

Siva can make bullets stop, challenge time and even make Posani Krishna Murali speak intelligently. On a side note, Siva meets Priya over the course of time and falls in love with her. Thikkal Reddy's gang members keep hunting for Siva and he decides to fight back. He also faces resistance from the mysterious Don D.

He fights them all with his powers and it is revealed that he is Siva Manohar I.P.S., a Young Cop in Undercover Operation. He has all the villains dead and when it comes to Don D, it is none other than his Grand Mother. She does so as to elevate Siva as a powerful hero and herself as a Don. At the court both are Exonerated and Siva is promoted as D.G.P. of Andhra Pradesh.

== Cast ==
- Allari Naresh as
  - Kamesh
  - Shiva Manohar I.P.S. a.k.a. Shiva
- Monal Gajjar as Priya
- Sayaji Shinde as Priya's father
- Brahmanandam as Jaffa Reddy / CBI officer Jaffa Rai
- Jaya Prakash Reddy as Thikkal Reddy
- Kovai Sarala as Kamesh's Mother / Don D
- Ali as Doctor
- M. S. Narayana as Rambo
- Krishna Bhagavaan as Priya's Father's P.A.
- Raghu Babu as Thikkal Reddy's henchman
- Venu Madhav as Car Driver
- Chalapathi Rao as Commissioner of Police of Hyderabad T. Chandra Sekhar
- Dharmavarapu Subramanyam as Rayudu
- L. B. Sriram as Remo
- Kondavalasa as Robo
- Jeeva as D.G.P. of Andhra Pradesh
- Srinivasa Reddy as Siddha
- Shankar Melkote as Judge
- Vijaya Rangaraju as Patha Basthi Pandu
- Dhanraj as Rowdy
- Suman Setty as Rambo's Father
- Narsing Yadav as Narsing
- Chammak Chandra as Reality Show Host Ohmkar
- Hema as Kamesh's wife
- Sravan as Thikkal Reddy's henchman
- Fish Venkat as Thikkal Reddy's henchman
- Prudhvi Raj as 30 years corporator
- Sri Latha as Hasini
- Allari Subhashini as Swarna
- Raghu Karumanchi as Thikkal Reddy's henchman
- G. V. Sudhakar Naidu as Thikkal Reddy's henchman
- Sameer as Doctor
- Surya as Software engineer-turned-street food seller
- Venu Yeldandi as auto driver
- Yadagari Rodda as Thikkal Reddy's enemy
- Kishore Daas as Thodagottudu school principal
- Jyothi Labala as Kamesh's keep
- Posani Krishna Murali as himself in reality show (cameo appearance)
- Sivasankar Master as himself in reality show (cameo appearance)

== Soundtrack ==
Sudigadu

Soundtrack album by Sri Vasanth
- Released: 24 July 2012
- Recorded: 2012
- Genre: Film soundtrack
- Length: 21:29
- Label: Aditya Music
- Producer: Sri Vasanth

Sri Vasanth chronology
Ryee Ryeee (2012)	Sudigadu (2012)	Rama Dandu (2013)

The music launch of Sudigadu was held on 23 July in Hyderabad. Sri Vasanth has scored the music and it was also reported that Allari Naresh also sang a song in this film. The audio was released by Dasari, who handed over the first copy to Tanish, Nikhil, and Uday Kiran. It is the only film which had a Platinum Disc Function before the release of its audio. The song "Gajibiji Gathukula Roaddu" is copied from the song "Diva Diva" from the Kannada movie Johny Mera Naam Preethi Mera Kaam.

Track-List
No.	Title	Lyrics	Singer(s)	Length
1.	"Twinkle Twinkle"	Ramajogayya Sastry	Ranjith & Chorus	4:17
2.	"Inky Pinky"	Bhimaneni Roshita Sai	Allari Naresh, Rahul Sipligunj & Chorus	2:03
3.	"Yenduke Cheli"	Ananta Sriram	Haricharan & Chorus	4:11
4.	"Jagaalu Mottham"	Sirivennela Sitaramasastri	Revanth	1:59
5.	"Gajibiji Gathukula Roaddu"	Ramajogayya Sastry	Sahithi, Sri Krishna, Revanth, Pruthvi Chandra	4:31
6.	"Zara Zara"	Chandrabose	Allari Naresh, Geetha Madhuri, Hemachandra, Haritha, Chorus	4:26
Total length:				21:29

== Critical reception ==
Sudigadu has received mostly positive reviews from critics and audience. The Times of India gave a rating of 4/5. The Hindu stated that "Sudigadu is definitely worth a watch. The humour, here, is without malice and that itself is a big plus. NDTV gave a review stating "Bhimaneni Srinivas's Telugu film Sudigadu is a laugh riot that keeps the audience entertained right up till the end". Radhika Rajamani of Rediff.com gave a review stating "The film offers fun unlimited and will surely go down well with families". Mahesh Koneru of 123telugu.com gave a rating of 3.25/5 stating "Sudigaadu is a good clean entertainer that will make you laugh out loud. The spoofs are brilliant. Sudigaadu is one very enjoyable spoof on TFI and it makes for a good watch this weekend. Don’t miss it".

== Box office ==
Sudigadu proved to be a hit at the box office. The movie had a strong start in both Indian and overseas market with nearly 70% occupancy. The film has collected approximately Rs 58 million at the Indian box office on its 1st day and its performance is far better than that of several Telugu films of 2012.

In the US the movie raked in a storming US$100,000 for 3 days. The audience response for the movie on the first day was better than that of recent releases. Excluding Julayi, Eega, Rachcha and Gabbar Singh, no other Telugu movie has received such a good response at the USA box office in recent months. According to trade analyst Taran Adarsh, the film has taken Rs 2,455,000 ($44,255) from its screening in the country on Thursday and Friday.

Sudigadu collected a total collections of ₹700 million (US$7.3 million) till the end of its worldwide run.

== Awards ==
Ceremony	Category	Nominee	Result
60th Filmfare Awards South	Best Supporting Actress	Kovai Sarala	Nominated
