= Pravesh Mallick =

Indian composer, songwriter & singer

- Origin: India
- Genres: Indian film Music, Classical music, Sufi music, Nepali music
- Occupations: Composer, record producer, singer, musician, lyricist
- Years active: 2010–present

Pravesh Mallick is an Indian composer, songwriter and playback singer. After working as a stage performer and composing for non-film albums and songs he debuted as a film playback singer and composer in Prakash Jha's 2016 Hindi film Jai Gangaajal. Maya Thagni is an uplifting and motivational track that features Priyanka Chopra is seen bashing goons who harass innocent villagers and break the law and is beautifully sung by Pravesh Mallick. Mallick, a follower of Padma Shri Pandit Madhup Mudgal, is a lead singer and founder of Sufi rock fusion band ‘Sanidhya’. He has been working as a composer-singer and music teacher for the last 12 years.

== Music career ==
Pravesh started teaching music in Step by Step World School, Noida. He formed a choral music group Sparsh and performed in various parts of India. Later, his interest in music by Nusrat Fateh Ali Khan, A. R. Rahman and others led him to form a band named Sanidhya. It performs Sufi, folk, Classical fusion with his own composition. Pravesh also continues with his recording interest by releasing cassettes in different languages like Maithili, Nepali, Hindi, Punjabi and composing music for regional movies and theater productions. Some of his popular albums in Maithili are Geet Ghar Ghar Ke, Chaura Tora Bazzar Khastau, Lehuaayal Aanchar, Khota Shingaar.

He got his first major break in Prakash Jha's film Jai Gangaajal on which he worked with Salim–Sulaiman and sang a Maya Thagni song in his rustic and raw vocals.

== Discography ==
=== Films ===
Year	Film	Director	Song	Credit	Composer	Note
2016	Jai Gangaajal	Prakash Jha	"Maya Thagni"	Singer	Salim-Sulaiman	
2016	Mithila Makhaan	Nitin Chandra		Singer, composer	Himself	Non-Hindi film
2017	Bareilly Ki Barfi	Ashwiny Iyer Tiwari	"Sweety Tera Drama"	Singer, writer	Tanishk Bagchi	
2019	Jabariya Jodi	Prashant Singh	"Zila Hilela"	Singer	Tanishk Bagchi	
2020	Taanashah	Ritam Srivastava		Singer, composer	Himself	
2020	Transparency: Pardarshita		"Kitna Chanda Jeb Mein Aaya"	Udit Narayan	Singer	song written by lyricist Annu Rizvi
2021	Kaagaz	Satish Kaushik	"Laalam lal"	Composer	Himself	Zee5 film
2023	Bawaal	Nitesh Tiwari	"Kat Jayega"	Singer	Tanishk Bagchi	Amazon Prime Video film
2025	Bhool Chuk Maaf	Karan Sharma	"Chor Bazari Phir Se"	Singer	Tanishk Bagchi	
