= Des Mein Niklla Hoga Chand =

Indian television series

- Genre: Drama
- Written by: Anand Vardhan; Ila Dutta Bedi
- Directed by: Aruna Irani; Ashok Gaikwad; Ashish Bhatia; Manesh Om Singhania
- Starring: Sangeeta Ghosh; Varun Badola; Amar Upadhyay
- Opening theme: "Des Mein Niklla Hoga Chand" by Sukhwinder Singh
- Country of origin: India
- Original language: Hindi
- No. of seasons: 1
- No. of episodes: 179

Production
- Producers: Aruna Irani; Sunjoy Waddhwa; Comall Waddhwa
- Running time: approximately 42 minutes
- Production companies: AK Films; Sphere Origins

Original release
- Network: StarPlus
- Release: 29 October 2001 – 28 March 2005

Des Mein Niklla Hoga Chand is an Indian television series that aired on StarPlus. The show was initially directed and produced by Aruna Irani under AK Films and since late 2004 by Sunjoy Waddhwa's Sphere Origins until its end. It originally aired from 29 October 2001 to 28 March 2005.

== Plot ==
The story is about the family of Pritam Singh, an NRI who settled in the United Kingdom. The show is largely centered on Preetam's granddaughter, Parminder (Sangeeta Ghosh), who holds traditional Indian values. The story takes off when Parminder meets Dev (Varun Badola) at her cousin's wedding in Chandigarh. They fall in love, but Pammi is already engaged to Dr. Rohan in London. They eventually get married, but alas happiness is not written in their destiny as Dev's ex-fiancé Anu marries Pammi's brother and has made it her task in taking revenge on Pammi by ending her and Dev's marriage.

This is a story of love, revenge and hate as the twists and turns in this story determine the fate of the lives of Pammi and Dev.

== Cast ==
- Sangeeta Ghosh as
  - Parminder "Pammi" Singh Kent / Parminder Dev Malik / Parminder Rohan Malhotra (2001–2004; 2005)
  - Mahi Malik "Gungun" / Mahi Rajveer Kapoor: Dev and Pammi's daughter; Rajveer's wife; Sharad and Jaya's adopted daughter; Piya's adopted elder sister (2004–2005)
- Varun Badola as
  - Dev Malik (2001–2003; 2005)
  - Rohit Sharma (Plastic Surgery) / Bhola (2004)

Bobby Poonia - Raj Khurana; Simran’s husband; Anu’s brother

- Amar Upadhyay as
  - Rohit Sharma: An underworld don; Anjali's widower; Richa's father (2003; 2005) (Dead)
  - Dev Malik "Raj" (Plastic Surgery) (2003–2004)
- Siddharth Dhawan as Dr. Rohan Malhotra: Pammi's ex–husband (2001–2004) (Dead)
- Arun Bali as Preetam Singh Kent: Sukhwant's husband; Rajendra's father; Pammi, Sam, Dingy and Tina's grandfather; Mahi's maternal great grandfather (2001–2005)
- Vineeta Malik as Sukhwant Preetam Singh Kent: Preetam's wife; Rajendra's mother; Pammi, Sam, Dingy and Tina's grandmother; Mahi's maternal great grandmother (2001–2004)
- Yatin Karyekar as Rajendra "Raj" Singh Kent: Preetam and Sukhwant's son; Teji's husband; Madhu's boyfriend; Pammi, Sam, Dingy and Tina's father; Mahi's maternal grandfather (2001–2003) (Dead)
- Aruna Irani as Teji Rajinder Singh Kent: Rajendra's widow; Pammi, Sam and Dingy's mother; Tina's stepmother; Mahi's maternal grandmother (2001–2005)
- Swapnil Joshi as Samarjeet "Sam" Singh Kent: Rajendra and Teji's son; Pammi's younger and Dingy's elder brother; Tina's elder half–brother; Anu's ex–husband (2001–2004)
- Sweta Keswani as Anu Khurana / Anu Samarjeet Singh Kent: Dev's obsessive one sided lover; Sam's ex–wife (2001–2004) (Dead)
- Romanchak Arora as Akash Mehra: Dingy's husband (2002–2005)
- Tasneem Khan / Himanshi Choudhry as Dingy Singh Kent / Dingy Akash Mehra: Rajendra and Teji's younger daughter; Pammi and Sam's younger sister; Tina's elder half–sister; Akash's wife (2001–2002) / (2002–2004)
- Karishma Tanna as Tina Singh Kent: Rajendra and Madhu's daughter; Teji's stepdaughter; Pammi, Sam and Dingy's younger half–sister (2004–2005)
  - Hansika Motwani as Child Tina Singh Kent (2001–2003)
- Urvashi Dholakia as Preet: Pammi's friend (2001–2002)
- Mohan Azad as Vikramjeet
- Ranjeev Verma as Satish
- Kulbir Baderson as Kuljeet (Satish's Wife)
- Satyen Kappu as Jaswant Singh
- Rajesh Kumar as Narendra Singh (Jaswant's Son)
- Phalguni Parekh as
  - Madhu: Rajendra's girlfriend; Tina's mother (2001–2002) (Dead)
  - Reena Thapar: Madhu's look alike (2003)
- Kishwer Merchant as Sonam (Samarjeet's friend)
- Ashlesha Sawant as Anjali Rohit Sharma
- Sai Ballal as Inspector Verma
- Anant Jog as
  - Sharat Patil
  - Shankar Patil
- Adi Irani as Mr. Khurana (Anu's father)
- Paritosh Sand as Advocate Sharad Mathur
- Sunil Jaitley as John
- Aashish Kaul as DIG Arjun Deshmukh / ACP Arjun Deshmukh
- Rocky Verma as Hospital Incharge
- Neha Mehta as Heer "Fake Gungun" Yash Kapoor : An orphan who was brought by Teji as replacement of Mahi as she was lost from the orphanage; Yash's first wife and murderer; Rajveer's ex–fiancèe and one sided obsessive lover (2004–2005)
- Rohit Roy as Yash Kapoor: Shekhar and Nirmala's son; Rajveer's elder half–brother; Heer and Richa's husband (2004–2005) (Dead)
- Rajeev Kumar as Kukku
- Sheela Sharma as Sanjyot (Kukku's wife)
- Sushmita Daan as Richa Sharma / Richa Yash Kapoor: Rohit and Anjali's daughter; Yash's second wife (2004–2005)
- Ankur Nayyar as Rajveer Kapoor: Shekhar's younger son; Yash's younger half–brother; Mahi's husband; Heer's ex–fiancè (2004–2005)
- Tasneem Sheikh as Priya Mathur: Sharad and Jay's daughter; Mahi's adopted younger sister; Ranveer's one sided obsessive lover (2004–2005)
- Vishal Watwani as Abhay
- Neena Gupta as Nirmala Diwan (formerly Kapoor): Shekhar's ex–wife; Yash's mother (2004)
- Amit Singh Thakur as Shekhar Kapoor: Nirmala's ex–husband; Yash and Ranveer's father (2004–2005)
- Tom Alter as Advocate (2004)
- Rajan Kapoor as Judge K. John (2004)
- Seema Bhargav
- Kiran Bhargava
- Shruti Seth
- Kainaaz Parvez
- Deven Verma
- Natasha Sinha as Jaya Sharad Mathur: Sharad's wife; Piya's mother; Mahi's adopted mother (2004–2005)
- as Veerendra Singh Malik: Dev's father

== Awards ==
=== Indian Telly Awards - winners ===
- In 2002
  - Best Costumes for a TV show - Ritu Deora
- In 2003
  - Best Programme of the Year
  - Weekly Serial of the Year Shared with Sanjivani
  - Best Title Singer for a TV Show - Sukhwinder Singh
  - Best Director of the Year - Aruna Irani
  - Best Child Artist of the Year - Hansika Motwani
- In 2004
  - Best Weekly Serial

== Production ==
Based on the backdrop of Punjab, the series was produced and directed by Aruna Irani. It was shot extensively in United Kingdom and India. Some initial scenes were shot at Chandigarh.

When Varun Badola quit, Amar Upadhyay was cast for his role of Dev in May 2003.

In October 2003, the series had a crossover with Kasautii Zindagii Kay when both completed two years on the same day with the characters Bubbles Singh from the series and Tapur from Kasautii getting married.

Initially produced by Aruna Irani under AK Films, during October 2004, StarPlus transferred the production of the series to Sphere Origins owing Irani's poor health conditions then. Planned to axe the series in December 2004 owing low ratings, StarPlus then gave the series time until April 2005 and cut the one hour timing of the series to half an hour for the ratings to improve. However, as it did not improve, it ended on 28 March 2005.

== Reception ==
=== Critics and impact ===
In 2004 Outlook India quoted, "The soap has carried forward over the years in a compelling, realistic manner."

The series was criticized by the Shiromani Gurdwara Parbandhak Committee for portrayal of Sikhs and for non-baptized actors playing roles of baptized Sikhs.

=== Ratings ===
It became one of the top rated Hindi GEC soon after its premiere ranging between 9 and 13 TVR.

In the week 29 December 2002, to 4 January 2003, the series entered the top 10 watched television series after many months, which was earlier occupying positions 11 and 12, garnering 7.4 TVR and the following week, it occupied ninth position with 8.09 TVR. It had also beaten the top shows Kyunki Saas Bhi Kabhi Bahu Thi, Kahaani Ghar Ghar Ki and Kasautii Zindagii Kay to the top spot during early May 2003 garnering 10.9 TVR. The crossover episode between Des Mein and Kasautii during October 2003 garnered 14+ TVR.

However, during 2004, the ratings of the series started to decline and the series ended in 2005.
