= Tu Juliet Jatt Di =

Indian drama television series

- Genre: Romance; Drama; Comedy
- Created by: Ravi Dubey; Sargun Mehta
- Developed by: Initial Concept; Sonal Ganotra; Romit Ojha
- Written by: Dialogues: Rahul Patel; Isha Sharma
- Screenplay by: Vera Raina
- Story by: Shivangi Singh; Anubhav Proothi; Mitali Bhattacharya; Swapnil Chauhan
- Directed by: Ankur Bhatia; Mohsin Khan; Kushal Zaveri; Amit D. Malik; Komal Kamble
- Creative directors: Meetu Singh; Ravi Sharma; Varinder Sandhu
- Starring: Jasmeet Kaur; Syed Raza Ahmed; Sangita Ghosh
- Opening theme: "Tu Juliet Jatt Di"
- Country of origin: India
- Original language: Hindi
- No. of seasons: 1
- No. of episodes: 369

Production
- Executive producer: Sunny Sukhdev Prasad
- Producers: Ravi Dubey; Sargun Mehta
- Editor: Shashank Singh
- Camera setup: Multi-camera
- Running time: 21–30 minutes
- Production company: Dreamiyata Entertainment

Original release
- Network: Colors TV
- Release: 17 November 2025 – present

Tu Juliet Jatt Di (transl. You’re the Jatt’s Juliet) is an Indian Hindi-language television drama series that premiered on 17 November 2025 on Colors TV and streams digitally on JioHotstar. Produced by Ravi Dubey and Sargun Mehta, the college drama series stars Jasmeet Kaur, Syed Raza Ahmed, and Sangita Ghosh in pivotal roles.

== Plot ==
Nineteen-year-old Heer Sandhu is sharp-tongued and ambitious. Growing up with an alcoholic and physically abusive father, she dreams of studying at Chandigarh Prime University, securing a stable career, and rescuing her mother and little sister.

Conversely, twenty-one-year-old Nawab Brar is a wealthy and spoiled heir to a multi-million dollar company. Growing up pampered and carefree, he has lived life untouched by consequences, chasing his cricket passion with a golden spoon in his mouth.

Their contrasting worlds collide when Heer and Nawab hatch a fake dating scheme to help him escape a forced marriage orchestrated by his father. What begins as a calculated plan to outsmart their families spirals out of control, and in a twist of fate, their charade traps them in a marriage neither of them wanted.

Determined to keep their impulsive marriage a secret, Heer and Nawab agree to live as strangers at Chandigarh Prime University. But proximity breeds tension. As Heer and Nawab navigate campus life, unspoken emotions surface—jealousy, possessiveness, wounded pride, and lingering resentment.

What began as a forced alliance slowly turns into a complicated emotional battleground, where ambition, ego, and unexpected feelings threaten to expose the truth they are trying so hard to hide.

== Cast ==
=== Main ===
- Jasmeet Kaur as Heer Nawab Brar, a.k.a. Juliet, Thelawati: Ajit and Neelu's elder daughter, Preeti's sister, Nawab's wife (2025–present)
- Syed Raza Ahmed as Nawab Brar, a.k.a. Jatt, Gadha: Gulaab and Dalip's youngest son, Sunny and Jimmy's brother, Heer's husband (2025–present)

=== Recurring ===
- Sangita Ghosh as Gulaab Brar: Kimmy's sister; Dalip's wife, Sunny, Jimmy and Nawab's mother (2025–present)
- Digvijay Purohit as Dalip Brar: Gulaab's husband, Sunny, Jimmy and Nawab's father (2025–present)
- Pardeep Singh Toor / Ramandeep Singh Sur as Sunny Brar: Gulaab and Dalip's eldest son; Jimmy and Nawab's brother; Anmol's husband (2025) /(2025–present)
- Chetna Singh as Anmol Brar: Sunny's wife (2025–present)
- Anmol Gupta as Jimmy Dalip Brar: Gulaab and Dalip's second son; Sunny and Nawab's brother; Richa's husband (2025–2026)
- Aanchal Khurana / Malika as Richa Brar: Jimmy's wife (2025–2026) / (2026-present)
- Balwinder Kaur as Bebe: Surjit and Ajit's mother; Pammi, Tony, Heer and Preeti's grandmother (2025–present)
- Raman Dhagga as Surjit Sandhu: Bebe's son; Ajit's brother; Lovely's husband; Pammi and Tony's father (2025–present)
- Gunabi Mann as Lovely Sandhu: Surjit's wife; Pammi and Tony's mother (2025–present)
- Cheshta Ahuja as Pammi Sandhu: Lovely and Surjit's daughter; Tony's sister (2025–present)
- Armaan Gumber as Tony Sandhu: Lovely and Surjit's son; Pammi's brother (2025–present)
- Madan Tyagi as Arjit Sandhu: Bebe's son; Surjit's brother; Neelu's husband; Heer and Preeti's father (2025–present)
- Shefali Rana as Neelu Sandhu: Ajit's wife; Heer and Preeti's mother (2025–present)
- Ridhima Rampal as Preeti Sandhu: Ajit and Neelu's younger daughter; Heer's sister (2025–present)
- Kimmy Kaur as Kimmy Kapoor Gulab's Sister (2026–present)
- Abhishek Sharma as Gurbaaz “Buzzo” Singh Gill: Nawab's best friend; Koyal's Boyfriend. (2025–present)
- Alisha Parveen Khan as Tina: Nawab's childhood friend who's in love with him later one-sided ex-girlfriend. (2025–present)
- Ayush Sharma as Arjun Bedi: CPU cricket team's current captain and Heer's one-sided lover and ex-fiance. (2025–present)
- Robin Thakur as Hardy: Nawab's friend (2025–present)
- Ankit Sharma as Jassa (Snake): Nawab's CPU friend (2025–present)
- Gaurav Koudanya as Maddy: Nawab's CPU friend (2025–present)
- Inderpreet Sahni as Koyal Bhatia: Heer's best friend; Buzzo's Girlfriend. (2025–present)
- Saloni Kumar as Saloni: Tina's henchwoman/minion (2025–present)
- Vikas Neb as Professor Kailash (2025–present)
- Inder Jeet as Coach's son from college and Nawab's enemy (2025)
- Ganesh Kapoor as Nawab College Coach: (2025–present)
- Annie as Annie: Tina's henchwoman/minion (2025–present)
- Sarabjeet Singh Myan as Doctor (2025)
- Bhumika Sharma as Simran Verma: Heer's cousin and Nawab's new friend later one-sided lover (2026)
- Yogesh Garg as Locker College Student The Boy who has been in same class for the past 4 year and Nawab Super senior (2026)
- Mannat Sharma as Kim: Tina's henchwoman/minion (2026-present)
- Shreya Jain as Sahiba Kapoor / Fake Cherry (2026–present)
- Nitin Guleria as Vaaris Bedi (2026–present)
- Varinder Sandhu / Shinda is associated with the series as both an actor and Creative Head

== Production ==
=== Release ===
The series was originally set to release on 27 October 2025, however it was postponed to 17 November 2025. The producers went to promote the show on Bigg Boss 19.

=== Casting ===
Syed Raza Ahmed was confirmed to play male lead as Nawab, while debutant Jasmeet Kaur was cast as the female lead, Heer. Sangita Ghosh joined the series as Gulaab, while Digvijay Purohit joined the cast as Dalip, Nawab's father. In May 2026, Aanchal Khurana quit the series citing lack of screen time for her character. At the same month, Bhumika Sharma joined the cast as Simran. In August 2026, Ghosh wrapped up her track after serving her notice period due to creative dissatisfaction.

== Reception ==
The show became the slot leader from December 2025 to January 2026 with a 1.4 TRP and household reach of 2.4 TVR. In April, it trend at no 1 spot on its streaming platform JioHotstar.

=== Impact ===
In February 2026, Raza Ahmed, Kaur and Ghosh representing the show attended 54th Rose festival held in Chandigarh.
