= Kalash (TV series) =

- Written by: Anjana Sood; Vikash Chandra
- Directed by: Swapna Waghmare Joshi
- Creative directors: Monisha Singh; Salima Bawani
- Starring: Amar Upadhyay; Aman Verma; Dolly Sohi
- Opening theme: "Kalash" by Jaspinder Narula
- Country of origin: India
- Original language: Hindi

Production
- Producers: Ekta Kapoor; Shobha Kapoor
- Production location: Mumbai
- Cinematography: Sanjay K. Memane
- Editor: M.D. Nazir
- Camera setup: Multi-camera
- Running time: 21 minutes
- Production company: Balaji Telefilms

Original release
- Network: Star Plus
- Release: 20 October 2000 – 20 February 2003

Kalash is an Indian television soap opera which aired on Star Plus. It was produced by Ekta Kapoor of Balaji Telefilms.

== Plot ==
Kalash is the story of sisters Rano and Bulbul. Bulbul, the elder of the two, is beautiful but selfish, whereas Rano is caring and loving. The sisters develop romantic feelings for the same man, Ram. Bulbul is married to Ram against her wishes. Later, she leaves her husband and their child and elopes with another man. Rano is then married to Ram because he has a child that needs motherly love, slowly she begins to fall for him and Ram too starts liking her when Bulbul suddenly reappears and wants her family back. Bulbul conspires and tries to separate Ram and Rano. The show ends with Rano's death by cancer and Bulbul realizing her mistake and reuniting with Ram.

== Cast ==
- Amar Upadhyay / Aman Verma as Ram
- Dolly Sohi as Rano
- Chetan Pandit
- Nandita Puri
