= Aav Taru Kari Nakhu =

- Directed by: Rrahul Mevawala
- Produced by: Vikas Verma; Sunny Agrawal
- Starring: Tiku Talsania; Amar Upadhyay; Manisha Kanojia; Monal Gajjar; Aditya Kapadia; Tanvi Thakkar; Tapan A Bhatt; Vikas Verma
- Cinematography: Narendra Joshi
- Edited by: Imtiaz Alam
- Music by: Kedar Bhagat; Piyush Kanojia
- Production company: Vighnaharta Productions Ltd.
- Release date: 2 June 2017
- Running time: 120 minutes
- Country: India
- Language: Gujarati

Aav Taru Kari Nakhu is a 2017 Gujarati comedy film Produced by Vikas Verma & Sunny Agrawal, Directed by Rrahul Mevawala, Creative supervision and edited by Imtiaz Alam. The film stars Tiku Talsania, Amar Upadhyay, Aditya Kapadia, Monal Gajjar, Tanvi Thakkar, Manisha Kanojia, Tapan bhatt and Vikas Verma. Amar Upadhyay, who formerly played the role of ‘Mihir’ in Kyunki Saas Bhi Kabhi Bahu Thi TV show marks his debut in the Gujarati Film Industry with this film.

== Plot ==
A stoic widower father wishes his sons to get married who show no interest in doing so. He then falls in love and ends up marrying his college sweetheart. Incidentally, the sons too fall in love around the same time and express their desire to get married. However, fearing their girlfriends would reject their proposals if they find their father has recently married, they attempt innovative and hilarious ways to sabotage their father's marriage.

== Cast ==
- Tiku Talsania as Hasmukh
- Manisha Kanojia as Shakuntla
- Amar Upadhyay as Dushyant
- Monal Gajjar as Meena
- Aditya Kapadia as Himanshu
- Tanvi Thakkar as Teena
- Tapan A Bhatt as Kaki Kaka
- Vikas Verma as Vikas

== Track listing ==
Songs are on Zee Music Gujarati as below:

=== Track listing ===
Songs are as follows

Track #	Song	Singer	Music	Length
1	"Aav Taru Kari Nakhu"	Shaan	Kedar Bhagat	3:56
2	"Silky Silky Ankho Ma"	Shaan and June Banerjee	Piyush Kanojia	3:39
3	"Bhini Bhini Raat Maa"	Shaan and Manjeera Ganguly	Kedar Bhagat & Piyush Kanojia	4:28
4	"Baby Pase Avi Ja"	Sanjay Sawant, Aditi Paul, Nayan Rathod and Manjeera Ganguly	Kedar Bhagat	3:50

== Release ==
The Film was released in cinemas on 2 June 2017 in Gujarat and Maharashtra.
