= Jodi Kya Banayi Wah Wah Ramji =

- Directed by: Raman Kumar
- Written by: Raman Kumar
- Screenplay by: Anurag Prapann; Umesh Shukla
- Story by: Anurag Prapann; Umesh Shukla
- Produced by: Ashish Jalan; Vivek Suchanti
- Cinematography: Inderjeet Bansal
- Music by: Anand Raj Anand
- Production company: Concept Productions
- Release date: 14 November 2003
- Country: India
- Language: Hindi

Jodi Kya Banayi Wah Wah Ramji is a 2003 Indian film directed by Raman Kumar starring Amar Upadhyay.

== Plot ==
Vishawnath and Kalicharan are best friends and neighbours. They want their children, Vishal and Priyanka, to get married so that their friendship can turn into a good relationship. But Vishal and Priyanka always have fights with each other and are quarrelsome. The landlord in their neighbourhood, Ramprasad, tells the pair to convince their parents that marriage is not for them. Ramprasad decides to create many misunderstandings between the fathers which results in comical chaos and danger from an unexpected source for the two families and children.

== Cast ==
- Amar Upadhyay as Vishal
- Reemma Sen as Priyanka
- Paresh Rawal as Ramprasad
- Gulshan Grover as Kalicharan-Bedilal
- Tiku Talsania as Vishwanath
- Rakesh Bedi as Poptallal
- Avtar Gill as Ajit Rai
- Kunickaa Sadanand
- Anjana Mumtaz
- Amita Nangia

== Music ==
1. "Sun Mere Mahiya" - Sonu Nigam, Shreya Ghoshal
2. "Ek To Baarish Uspe Tera Intezaar" - Anand Raj Anand, Kavita Krishnamurthy
3. "Wah Wah Ramji Wah Wah" - Shaan
4. "December Ka Mahina" - Anand Raj Anand, Sadhana Sargam
5. "Aaja Dildaara" - Sukhwinder Singh
6. "Thodi Peele Thoda Jeele (Jeele Peele)" - Vinod Rathod, Udit Narayan

== Critical response ==
Taran Adarsh of IndiaFM gave the film 1 star out of 5, writing ″On the whole, JODI KYA BANAI WAH WAH RAMJI is a light entertainer but the comedy is such that it has been witnessed umpteen times in the past. At the box-office, lack of publicity and ordinary merits will only add to its woes.″ Rama Sharma of The Tribune wrote ″Paresh Rawal's acting versatility adds shafts of wit. But when his antics get too much, we have Gulshan Grover (in double role) to tear us away. The music also fails to score much. The song ′December ka maheena ho aur saath mein ek hasina ho′ accentuates the improvised verses which are in galore.″ Seema Pant of Rediff.com wrote ″Paresh Rawal looked as if he would rather be some place else. By promoting it as a Paresh Rawal comedy, the makers have tried to cash in on the latter's popularity after movies like Hera Pheri, Awara Paagal Deewana and Hungama. Unfortunately for the viewers, they forgot that it takes more than just a seasoned actor for a film to work.″
