= Dracula 2012 =

2013 film directed by Vinayan

- Theatrical release poster
- Directed by: Vinayan
- Written by: Vinayan
- Produced by: Akash Films
- Starring: Sudheer Sukumaran; Monal Gajjar; Shraddha Das; Prabhu; Thilakan; Nassar
- Cinematography: Sathish. G
- Edited by: Nishadh Yusuf
- Music by: Babith George
- Production company: Akash Films
- Release date: 8 February 2013
- Running time: 129 minutes
- Country: India
- Language: Malayalam
- Budget: ₹10-12 crore

Dracula 2012 is a 2013 Indian Malayalam-language vampire film directed by Vinayan, starring Sudheer Sukumaran, Prabhu, Monal Gajjar, Nassar, Shraddha Das and Thilakan.

The film was partially re-shot in Tamil and Telugu as Naangam Pirai and Punnami Ratri, respectively. The film was dubbed in English for a Western release and later dubbed in Hindi as "Aur Ek Dracula" (One more Dracula). Portions of the film were shot in Bran Castle in Romania. The cost of the film was ₹100-120 million and was originally released on 8 February 2013.

== Premise ==
While on his honeymoon in Romania, a man visits the Bran Castle and upon his return to the hotel, kills his bride. He then returns to his homeland and begins to hunt for new victims.

== Cast ==
- Sudheer Sukumaran as Roy Thomas / William D'Souza / Count Dracula
- Monal Gajjar as Meena
- Shraddha Das as Thaara
- Prabhu as Dr. Paul Robinson
- Nassar as Suryamoorthy
- Aryan as Raju
- Priya Nambiar as Lucy Thomas
- Thilakan
- Krishna as Benny IPS
- Krishna Bhagavan as Sub-Inspector G. Ajay Kumar (Telugu version)

== Music ==
Dracula

Soundtrack album by Babith George Vimal
- Released: 2012
- Recorded: 2012
- Genre: Soundtrack
- Length: 15:16
- Label: Manorama Music
- Producers: Babith George; Vimal

Track list
No.	Title	Lyrics	Singer(s)	Length
1.	"Parijatha Pookkal"	Shalini Noble	Vidhu Prathap	4:40
2.	"Manju Pole"	Vayalar Sarath Chandra Varma	Renjith Unni, Manjari	4:44
3.	"Prince of Darkness"	Vinayan	Sunidhi Chauhan, Sandra	3:49
4.	"Dance"		Instrumental	2:03
Total length:				15:16

=== Naangam Pirai (Tamil version) ===
Naangam Pirai

Soundtrack album by Babith George
- Released: 2012
- Recorded: 2012
- Genre: Soundtrack
- Length: 17:49
- Label: Think Music India
- Producer: Babith George

Track list
No.	Title	Lyrics	Singer(s)	Length
1.	"Paarijatha Poove"	Pa. Vijay	Karthik	4:41
2.	"Andhi Vennila"	Pa. Vijay	Ranjith, Ganga	4:44
3.	"Opening Theme"		Instrumental	1:23
4.	"Seductive Beats"		Instrumental	2:04
5.	"Prince of Darkness"		Instrumental	4:57
Total length:				17:49

=== Punnami Raathri (Telugu version) ===
Punnami Raathri

Soundtrack album by Babith George Raghu Ram
- Released: 2012
- Recorded: 2012
- Genre: Soundtrack
- Length: 20:09
- Label: Aditya Music
- Producers: Babith George; Raghu Ram

Track list
No.	Title	Lyrics	Singer(s)	Length
1.	"Punnami Raathri"	Kishore Senagala	Sravana Bhargavi	3:11
2.	"Paarijatha Puvva"	Kishore Senagala	Karthik	4:37
3.	"9848 Number"	Kedarnath Parimi	Mamta Sharma	4:28
4.	"Manchupoola Vanalle"	Kishore Senagala	Ranjith, Ganga	4:37
5.	"Punnami Raathri (Theme)"		Instrumental	1:19
6.	"Punnami Raathri (Romantic Beats)"		Instrumental	1:57
Total length:				20:09

== Reception ==
=== Critical response ===
Dracula 2012 won mostly unfavourable reviews upon release with critics criticizing the visual effects, plot and performances. Sify.com called the film "a sheer waste of time and money" as well as commenting that "the film has been presented in 3D but the effects look shoddy and mostly amateurish". Though the film was an underperformer, it ran for 50 days in theatres.

== See also ==
- Vampire film
- List of Malayalam horror films
