= Viraasat (2006 TV series) =

- Directed by: Arvind Babbal
- Starring: see below
- Opening theme: Lalit Sen
- Country of origin: India
- Original language: Hindi
- No. of episodes: 235

Production
- Producers: B.R. Chopra; Ravi Chopra
- Running time: approximately 23 minutes

Original release
- Network: STAR Plus; STAR One
- Release: 12 June 2006 – 26 July 2007

Viraasat (transl. Inheritance) is an Indian Hindi-language drama television series that debuted on STAR Plus, with broadcast of the series later shifting to STAR One. It aired from 12 June 2006 to 26 July 2007. It was produced by B.R. Films.

== Story ==
Viraasat is the story of two people in love bound by an age-old enmity between their families.

== Cast ==
- Amar Upadhyay as Kunal Kharbanda (Kailash's Son)
- Aman Verma as Rishabh Lamba (Raman's Middle Son)
- Rohit Roy as Rahul Lamba (Raman's Youngest Son)
- Sangeeta Ghosh as Priyanka Kharbanda (Kailash's Daughter) / Priyanka Rahul Lamba
- Pooja Ghai Rawal as Anushka Rishabh Lamba
- Manasi Salvi as Gargi Kunal Kharbanda
- Kiran Kumar as Raman Lamba
- Deepak Qazir as Kailash Kharbanda
- Jayati Bhatia as Meera Raman Lamba
- Simone Singh as Anushka Rishabh Lamba
- Smita Bansal as Gargi Kunal Kharbanda
- Vishal Watwani as Ronnie
- Kanika Maheshwari as Juhi Lamba (Rohan's Daughter)
- Chinky Jaiswal as Shaina Kharbanda (Kunal & Gargi's Daughter)
- Gautam Chaturvedi / Akshay Anand as Rohan Lamba (Raman's Eldest Son)
- Ankur Nayyar as Dr. Raj Malhotra
- Chhavi Mittal as Niki (Anushka's Sister)
- Gajendra Chauhan as Yashwant Vij
- Sanjeet Bedi as Sanjay Vij (Yashwant's Son)
- Amit Pachori as Inspector Vishal Deshmukh
- Ravee Gupta as Tanya
- Karishma Tanna as Natasha Chopra
- Hrishikesh Pandey as Shekhar Sinha
- Aashish Kaul as Professor Vardhan
- Nitin Trivedi as College Principal
- Kaushal Kapoor as Gargi's Advocate
- Adi Irani as Fake Dr. M. D. Virmani
- Shahab Khan as Bhaskar Dey
- Sanjay Swaraj as Kishore Bhagat
- Cindrella D' Cruz as Receptionist
- Salim Shah as Mr. Marwah

== Production ==
The series premiered and aired on StarPlus in prime time slot until January 2007. On 22 January 2007, it was shifted to Star One due to the programming changes of StarPlus for its flagship show Kaun Banega Crorepati's premiere and also as the series did not garner expected ratings in Star Plus.

The series was made with a high budget of ₹ 20 crores.

== Reception ==
Rediff.com applauded the series as one of the best launch of the year 2006 stating, "Virasat had to be successful with such a massive star cast and strong screenplay. Stellar performances by Sangeeta Ghosh and Aman Verma guarantee the success of this serial."
