= Jeet (TV series) =

- Directed by: Bhooshan Patel
- Starring: see below
- Opening theme: "Jeet" by Shaan
- Country of origin: India
- Original language: Hindi
- No. of seasons: 1
- No. of episodes: 26

Production
- Running time: 53 minutes
- Production company: Rose Audio Visuals

Original release
- Network: StarPlus
- Release: 10 October 2003 – 2 April 2004

Jeet is a Hindi-language television series that aired on StarPlus from 10 October 2003 to 2 April 2004. It is based on lives of three individuals (Vikram, Janki and Nandini) and their love, of trust and of sacrifice. It is the story of how losing yourself in love is the best victory that you can have.

== Plot ==
The show is mainly based on the life of a young arrogant boy, Vikram Mall, who leaves behind a successful life in abroad to go back to India to teach at a college where he graduated from, because he deems that he can make a difference. At first, his excessive uprising to the old college’s authority gets him on the wrong side of the trustees, but slowly he manages to gain back the trust of the authority members, and they get him popular among students and other teachers. Vikram's charm first annoys and then interests Janki, a colleague, and they are drawn to each other. But all these hopes are soon washed out as Mall's scarred past catches up with him. The trustee of the college Jamini Devi whose daughter Nandini and Vikram were once in love is hell-bent on throwing Vikram out of the college unless they get back together again much against Jamini Devi's well laid plans. Shortly as the time passes, Nandini also comes as a professor to the college with the sole intention of spiting Vikram. Nandini and Mall are in fact victims of a misunderstanding which was carefully planned out by Nandini's, mother Jamini Devi.

== Cast ==
- Ankur Nayyar as Vikram Mal
- Aparna Tilak as Janki Mal Sehgal
- Mrinal Kulkarni as Amrita
- Neeru Bajwa as Nandini
- Kanika Kohli as Naina
- Dileep Saxena as Doctor
- Sunaina as Ritu
- Bharat Kapoor as Mr. Sharma
- Anupam Shyam as Kantaprasad
- Pavan Malhotra as Rekhari
- Arun Govil as Venu
- Aishwarya Sakhuja as Richa
- Shekhar Shukla as College Professor
- Krutika Desai Khan as Jamini Devi
- Mohan as Amrita's Father-In-Law
- Abbas Khan as Amrita's Husband
- Rakesh as Vikram's Friend
- Sumit Pathak as Rahul
- Vaquar Shaikh as College Professor
- Anupam Bhattacharya as Siddharth
- Mohan Gupte as Vikram's Father
- Savita Prabhune as Vikram's Mother
- Nigaar Khan as Anjali
- Hussain Kuwajerwala as Dev
- Alefia Kapadia as Nisha
- Ashish Kapoor as Saurav
- Sudhir Mitoo as Mr. Makhija
- Gulfam Ali as Mrs. Makhija
- Dinesh Hakku as Saurav's Father
- Manju Vyas as Saurav's Mother
- Ranvir Khurana as Sharad
