= Kyunkii Tum Hi Ho =

Indian drama television series

- Genre: Drama
- Directed by: Ajay Pandey
- Starring: Amar Upadhyay; Priyanka Dhawale; Karan Khanna; Harsh Nagar; Manish Raisinghan
- Country of origin: India
- Original language: Hindi
- No. of seasons: 1
- No. of episodes: 222

Production
- Executive producer: Hetal Upadhyay
- Producers: Amar Upadhyay; Suhail Zaidi
- Running time: 24 minutes
- Production company: Hawk Eye Vision

Original release
- Network: Shemaroo Umang
- Release: 12 December 2022 – 26 August 2023

Kyunkii Tum Hi Ho (transl. Because You Are The One) is an Indian Hindi-language romance drama television series. Produced by Amar Upadhyay and Suhail Zaidi under the banner of Hawk Eye Vision, it stars Priyanka Dhawale, Manish Raisinghan and Karan Khanna in lead roles and formerly starred Amar Upadhyay and Harsh Nagar in lead roles. It premiered on 12 December 2022 on Shemaroo Umang. It ended on 26 August 2023.

== Plot ==
A young, beautiful and carefree woman, Kavya Sharma loves her childhood friend, Ayushmaan Bhargav and believes they are made for each other. However, a wealthy individual, Karan Pratapsingh enters her life and brings about a dilemma.

== Cast ==
- Amar Upadhyay as Karan Pratapsingh: Vikram and Gayatri's son; Kunal's elder brother; Bhavani's elder grandson; Kavya's first husband; Om and Parvati's son-in-law; Prithvi's brother-in-law (2022–2023) (Dead)
- Priyanka Dhavale as Kavya Sharma / Kavya Karan Pratapsingh/ Kavya Kunal Pratapsingh: Om and Parvati's daughter; Karan's widow; Kunal's wife; Ayushmaan's best friend; Prithvi's elder sister; Vikram and Gayatri's daughter-in-law (2022–2023)
- Harsh Nagar as Ayushmaan Bhargav: Kavya's best friend; Manjari's son (2022–2023)
- Karan Khanna as Kunal Pratapsingh "Monu": Vikram and Gayatri's son; Karan's younger brother; Bhavani's younger grandson; Kavya's second husband; Om and Parvati's son–in–law; Prithvi's brother–in–law (2023)
- Saptrishi Ghosh as Om Sharma: Parvati's husband; Kavya and Prithvi's father; Karan and Kunal's father-in-law (2022–2023)
- Tasneem Ali as Parvati Om Sharma; Om's wife; Kavya and Prithvi's mother; Karan and Kunal's mother-in-law (2022–2023)
- Rohit Agarwal as Prithvi Sharma: Om and Parvati's son; Kavya's younger brother; Karan and Kunal's brother-in-law (2022–2023)
- Yatee Upadhyay as Ishika Pratapsingh: Bhanu and Menaka's daughter; Rocky's younger sister; Karan and Kunal's younger paternal cousin; Bhavani's granddaughter (2022–2023)
- Shahmir Khan as Rocky Pratapsingh: Bhanu and Menaka's son; Ishika's elder brother; Karan and Kunal's younger paternal cousin; Bhavani's younger grandson; Karan's murderer (2022–2023)
- Keerti Adarkar as Bhavani Pratapsingh: Vikram and Bhanu's mother; Karan, Kunal, Rocky and Ishika's grandmother; Gayatri and Menaka's mother-in-law (2022–2023)
- Shiva Rindani as Bhanu Pratapsingh: Vikram's younger brother; Menaka's husband; Rocky and Ishika's father; Bhavani's younger son; Karan and Kunal's paternal uncle (2022–2023)
- Deepali Saini as Menaka Bhanu Pratapsingh: Bhanu's wife; Rocky and Ishika's mother; Bhavani's younger daughter-in-law (2022–2023)
- Abha Parmar as Tripti Pratapsingh: Bhavani's sister–in–law; Vikram and Bhanu's paternal aunt (2023)
- Poonam Jangra as Gayatri Vikram Pratapsingh: Vikram's second wife; Kunal and Karan's mother; Bhavani's elder daughter-in-law; Kavya's mother–in–law (2023) (Dead)
- as Manjari Bhargav: Ayushmaan's mother
- Keisha Rawat as Sana: Ayushmaan's ex-fiance (2022–2023)
- Manish Raisinghan as Raju: A thug who was hired by Rocky to impersonate Karan Pratapsingh by proving that Karan has got a plastic surgery done on his face (2023)
- Unknown as Vikram Pratapsingh: Bhavani's elder son; Gayatri's husband; Karan and Kunal's father; Bhanu's elder brother; Rocky and Ishika's paternal uncle; Kavya's father-in-law (2022) (Dead)

== Production ==
The series was announced in 2022 by Shemaroo Umang, starring Harsh Nagar, Priyanka Dhawale and Amar Upadhyay. The promos featuring the leads were released in December 2022.
