= Uttar Pradesh Association of Dead People =

Indian advocacy group

- उत्तर प्रदेश मृतक संघ
- Founder: Lal Bihari
- Location: Azamgarh, India

The Uttar Pradesh Association of Dead People (Hindi: उत्तर प्रदेश मृतक संघ, Uttar Pradesh Mritak Sangh) is an Indian advocacy group based in Azamgarh, Uttar Pradesh that seeks to reclaim the legal rights of those falsely listed by the Uttar Pradesh State government as being dead.

In the overcrowded regions of Uttar Pradesh, many have resorted to bribing officials to have the owner of a plot of land declared deceased and the title transferred to their ownership (inherited). The process to undo this is long, arduous, as well as often inefficient and corrupt. The Association seeks to reverse the declarations, call attention to the problem and prevent others from being exploited in similar fashion.

The founder and president is Lal Bihari, who was "dead" from 1976 to 1994 and used the word Mritak (Hindi: मृतक, lit. 'Dead') in his name during the period.

After being inspired by the story of Bihari, Indian film director Satish Kaushik made the movie Kaagaz, starring Pankaj Tripathi, based on his life. It was released on ZEE5 on 7 January 2021.

== History ==
=== Lal Bihari's problem ===
In 1976, 20-year-old Lal Bihari's application for loan from a bank in Azamgarh was denied, on the grounds that he was officially dead. He soon learned that his uncle had bribed a government official with ₹300 (US$33.33) to have his nephew declared deceased, in order to inherit Lal Bihari's ancestral land holdings of about 1 acre (0.4 ha). Subsequently, Lal Bihari lost his home.

=== Formation ===
Lal Bihari was advised by legal counsel that such a case was very common in the area, and that having his death revoked would take years. To build momentum for the legal proceedings, he attempted to draw public attention to the case in a number of ways, including changing his name to Lal Bihari Mritak (mritak is the Hindi word for 'dead'). Bihari also insulted police and government officials, throwing pamphlets at them, trying to engage them in fights and kidnapping his uncle's child, to entice them into arresting him. (By arresting him, police and officials would have to acknowledge that he was living and hence would need to produce papers for that purpose.) He had his wife apply for a widow's pension, which was denied. He also contested Indian general elections against Rajiv Gandhi and Vishwanath Pratap Singh. Another attempt he made was staging a mock funeral for himself. In 1994, the Azamargh district magistrate, Hausla Prasad Verma, declared him to be once again alive. Bihari did, however, allow his uncle to continue farming the land he had stolen.

During these efforts, he attracted the attention of thousands of "dead" citizens across Uttar Pradesh. Bihari brought these people together with the creation of the Uttar Pradesh Mritak Sangh (Uttar Pradesh Association of Dead People). He admitted in 1999 that he did not know how many people were in the group, and it had no funds. His efforts earned him the Ig Nobel Prize in 2003.

== See also ==
- Credit zombie
