= T. Chandrasekhar Reddy =

Indian politician

Tikkavarapu Chandrasekhar Reddy

Member of Parliament, Rajya Sabha
- In office 1981–1993
- Constituency: Andhra Pradesh

Personal details
- Party: Indian National Congress
- Spouse: T. Urmila Reddy

Tatiparthi Chandrasekhar Reddy was an Indian politician. He was a Member of Parliament, representing Andhra Pradesh in the Rajya Sabha the upper house of India's Parliament as a member of the Indian National Congress.
