= Kaagaz =

Film by Satish Kaushik

- Release poster
- Directed by: Satish Kaushik
- Written by: Satish Kaushik
- Produced by: Ankit Mehta; Salman Khan; Nishant Kaushik; Vikas Malu
- Starring: Pankaj Tripathi; Monal Gajjar; Amar Upadhyay; Tina Ahuja; Lankesh Bhardwaj
- Cinematography: Arkodeb Mukherjee
- Edited by: Sanjay Verma
- Music by: Pravesh Mallick; Rahul Jain
- Production companies: Salman Khan Films; The Satish Kaushik Entertainment Production
- Distributed by: ZEE5
- Release date: 7 January 2021
- Running time: 109 minutes
- Country: India
- Language: Hindi

Kaagaz (transl. 'Paper') is a 2021 Indian biographical comedy film written and directed by Satish Kaushik and produced by Salman Khan and Nishant Kaushik under the banner of Salman Khan Films and The Satish Kaushik Entertainment Production. The film stars Pankaj Tripathi, Monal Gajjar and Amar Upadhyay.

The plot of the film is based on the life and struggle of Lal Bihari, a farmer from the small village of Amilo Mubarakpur, who was declared dead on official papers. It marked the last directorial venture of Kaushik before his death on 9 March 2023.

At the 2021 Filmfare OTT Awards, Kaagaz received 3 nominations – Best Web Original Film, Best Actor in a Web Original Film (Tripathi) and Best Supporting Actor in a Web Original Film (Kaushik). The spiritual sequel Kaagaz 2 was released to positive reviews on March 1, 2024.

== Synopsis ==
The film depicts the struggle of Bharat Lal Bihari against the Indian bureaucracy after he was declared dead on government records. His fight with the government lasted for 19 years.

== Cast ==
- Pankaj Tripathi as Bharatlal Bihari
- Monal Gajjar as Rukmanii
- Satish Kaushik as Advocate Sadhoram Kewat
- Mita Vashisht as MLA Asarfi Devi
- Brijendra Kala as Highcourt Judge
- Amar Upadhyay as MLA Vidhayak Jaganpal Singh
- Lankesh Bhardwaj as Sr. Inspector
- Neha Chauhan as Journalist Sonia
- Garrvil Mohan as Pablo
- Pranay Narayan as Devilal
- Amit Pathak as Harilal
- Sharat Sonu as Rampal
- Ratan Lal as Motiya
- Mahesh Chandra Deva as typist
- Arun Shekhar as Chaman Lal
- Dinesh Sharma as Panditji Pandey
- Yogesh Kumar Shukla as Shukla Ji
- Sandeepa Dhar Special appearance in Laalam Laal song
- Ajay Singh as Tyagi, Peshkaar of High court judge
- Lal Bihari in a cameo appearance as the man cycling beside Bharatlal

== Soundtrack ==
Kaagaz

Soundtrack album by Pravesh Mallick, Rahul Jain and ceAzer
- Released: 6 January 2021
- Recorded: 2018–19
- Genre: Feature film soundtrack
- Length: 24:26
- Language: Hindi
- Label: Salman Khan Films

The film's music was composed by Pravesh Mallick, Rahul Jain and ceAzer while lyrics written by Aseem Ahmed Abbasee, Rashmi Virag, Kunaal Vermaa and Shweta Raj.

Track listing
No.	Title	Lyrics	Music	Singer(s)	Length
1.	"Laalam Laal"	Aseem Ahmed Abbasee	Pravesh Mallick	Rajnigandha Shekhawat	4:21
2.	"Bailgadi"	Rashmi Virag	Pravesh Mallick	Udit Narayan, Alka Yagnik	4:28
3.	"Jug Jug Jiyo"	Aseem Ahmed Abbasee, Kunaal Vermaa	Rahul Jain	Rahul Jain	4:57
4.	"Jug Jug Jiyo" (Reprise)	Aseem Ahmed Abbasee, Kunaal Vermaa	Rahul Jain	Rahul Jain	5:14
5.	"Bulaave"	Shweta Raj	ceAzer	Papon	3:56
6.	"Poetry of Kaagaz"	Aseem Ahmed Abbasee	Rahul Jain	Salman Khan, Rahul Jain	2:30
Total length:					24:26

== Release ==
It premiered on 7 January 2021 on ZEE5.

== Reception ==
=== Critical reception ===
On the review aggregator website Rotten Tomatoes, 29% of 7 critics' reviews are positive, with an average rating of 5/10.

Pallabi Dey Purkayastha of The Times of India rated the film 3/5 and wrote "To sum it up, Kaagaz could have been the go-to movie for those seeking a burst of inspiration, but it ends up being a uni-dimensional masterclass on one man’s acting prowess. Not that we are complaining, but the film had the potential to tug at the heart strings. Alas! It was not to be."

Saibal Chatterjee of NDTV rated the film 3/5 and wrote "Satish Kaushik's labour of love drives home the plight of a common man up against an administrative system that thrives on running the already dispossessed further into the ground."

Gautaman Bhaskaran of News18 rated the film 2.5/5 and wrote "Kaagaz goes beyond the realm of parody, and a tighter leash on characterisations and scene conceptualisations could have gone a long way in turning Kaagaz into a more worthwhile watch."

== Accolades ==
Year	Award ceremony	Category	Nominee / work	Result	Ref.
2021	Filmfare OTT Awards	Best Web Original Film	Kaagaz	Nominated	
2021	Filmfare OTT Awards	Best Actor in a Web Original Film	Pankaj Tripathi	Nominated	
2021	Filmfare OTT Awards	Best Supporting Actor in a Web Original Film	Satish Kaushik	Nominated	
