= Monal Gajjar =

Indian actress

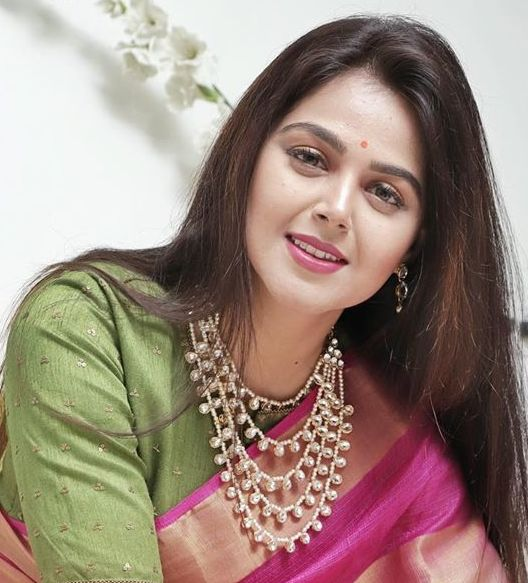
- Gajjar in 2020
- Born: 13 May 1991 (age 34)
- Occupations: Film actress; model
- Years active: 2012–present

Monal Gajjar is an Indian actress and model who mainly appears in Gujarati and Telugu films, and a few Tamil films. She debuted with 2012 Telugu film Sudigadu. She has also acted in Satish Kaushik directed Hindi film Kaagaz in 2021 which is a satire on governmental system in India.

== Life and career ==
Gajjar was born on 13 May in a Gujarati family and hails from Ahmedabad in Gujarat. While graduating in commerce, she started working in ING Vysya Bank. At the suggestion of her yoga teacher, Gajjar participated at the Mirchi Queen Bee beauty pageant contest organised by Radio Mirchi in 2011, which she went on to win. She later won the Miss Gujarat title as well.

Even before the release of her first film, Gajjar signed five films, including a film in Tamil and Telugu. She made début in Malayalam with Dracula 2012. She has done a special appearance in Asha Bhonsle's film. Her first two Tamil films Vanavarayan Vallavarayan and Sigaram Thodu released on the same day.

Gajjar received good reviews for her performance in Sigaram Thodu. IndiaGlitz.com review says - Monal looking clean and sweet in looks and acting wise. Gajjar also received good reviews for Vanavarayan Vallavarayan. Behindwoods.com review said - The tall Monal Gajjar looks totally gorgeous with sparkling eyes, and has all that it takes to be the next big glam sensation in Tamil Nadu. Though her role loses scope in the second half, she performs capably and also gets the lip-sync right.

In September 2020, Gajjar entered the Telugu reality TV show Bigg Boss 4 as one of the first contestants. She was evicted in December, before the final week.

== Filmography ==
=== Films ===
Key
†	Denotes film or TV productions that have not yet been released

Year	Film	Role	Language	Notes	Ref.
2012	Sudigadu	Priya	Telugu	Nominated – SIIMA Award for Best Female Debut – Telugu	
2012	Vennela 1 1/2	Vennela	Telugu		
2013	Mai	Herself	Hindi	Special appearance	
2013	Dracula 2012	Meena	Malayalam		
2013	Oka College Story	Sindhu	Telugu		
2014	Sigaram Thodu	Ambujam	Tamil		
2014	Vanavarayan Vallavarayan	Anjali	Tamil		
2014	Brother of Bommali	Sruthi	Telugu		
2016	Thai Jashe!	Kajal Bhatt	Gujarati		
2017	Aav Taru Kari Nakhu	Meena	Gujarati		
2017	Devdasi	Unknown	Telugu		
2018	Reva	Supriya	Gujarati		
2018	Family Circus	Riya	Gujarati		
2019	Man Udhaan Vara	Sarita	Marathi		
2021	Kaagaz	Rukmini	Hindi	Released on Zee5	
2021	Alludu Adhurs	Herself	Telugu	Special appearance in the song "Ramba Oorvasi"	
2022	Petipack	Kavya	Gujarati		
2022	Vickida No Varghodo	Anushree	Gujarati		
2023	Shubh Yatra	Saraswati	Gujarati		
2023	I Wish	Isha Patel	Gujarati		
2024	Kasoombo	Roshan	Gujarati		
2024	Vaar Tahevaar	Preetal	Gujarati		
2025	Malik Ni Varta	Saheli	Gujarati		
2025	Vash Level 2	School principal	Gujarati		

=== Television ===
Year	Show	Role	Language	Notes	Ref.
2020	Bigg Boss Telugu 4	Contestant	Telugu	Evicted on day 98	
2020–2021	Dancee Plus	Judge	Telugu		
2022	Dance Ikon	Mentor	Telugu	Aha original	

=== Web series ===
Year	Show	Language	Role	Notes	Ref.
2019-20	Aavuy Thay	Gujarati	Dhvani		-
2020	Bas Cha Sudhi 3	Gujarati	Monal		-
2021	Telugu Abbai .. Gujarati Ammayi	Telugu	Gujarati Ammayi	Project Withheld for unknown reasons	
