= Ankur Nayyar =

Indian television actor

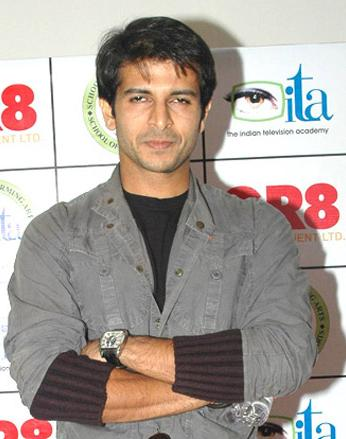
- Nayyar at the launch of ITA School of Performing Arts
- Occupation: Actor
- Years active: 2001–present
- Children: 2

Ankur Nayyar is an Indian television and film actor. He has worked in many shows like Kasautii Zindagii Kay, Kashmeer and Jeet. He is also known for playing the lead role of Samman Chaudhary in Sahara One's show Ghar Ek Sapnaa and playing the role of Sub Inspector Abbas in Singham.

He was little seen in 2013–2014, but he returned in 2015 in Sony TV's show Bharat Ka Veer Putra – Maharana Pratap as Acharya Raghvendra. He was also seen as Coach Rajveer Rana in Meri Durga and Tej Singh in Prem Ya Paheli - Chandrakanta. In July 2018, he went to play a cameo role of Mridul Rathod in Nazar (TV series). In 2018, he played the role of Randhir Ahluwalia in the Colors TV's popular show Tu Aashiqui. As of March 2019, he appeared in the Colors TV's historical drama Jhansi Ki Rani as Gangadas.

== Career ==
His acting career took off, with the TV series Kashmeer, where he played the character of Aamir Bhatt, a parallel lead.

In 2014, Ankur joined the cast of Ek Boond Ishq as the parallel lead. He was also seen in Woh Rehne Waali Mehlon Ki, Yahaan Main Ghar Ghar Kheli and Maharana Pratap.

In 2017, he was working on two shows - Meri Durga, where he essays the role of Coach Rana, and Prem Ya Paheli - Chandrakanta, where he plays Tej Singh. He recently finished his role as Humayun in Akbar. In 2018, he played the role of Randhir Ahluwalia in the Colors TV's popular show Tu Aashiqui. As of March 2019, he appeared in the Colors TV's historical drama Jhansi Ki Rani as Gangadas.

== Personal life ==
Nayyar is married and has a daughter and a son.

He was born in Pathankot, Punjab, India.

== Filmography ==
Year	Film	Role	Notes
2005	Yakeen	Siddharth Thakur	Guest appearance
2009	Detective Naani	CID Inspector Bhatia	Supporting role
2011	Singham	Inspector Abbas	Supporting role
2025	De De Pyaar De 2	Babbi	Supporting role

== Television ==
Year 1999	Serial School Days	Role Vicky	Notes Antagonist
2001–2002	Kasautii Zindagii Kay	Subroto Basu	
2003	Kashmeer	Aamir Bhatt	
2003–2004	Jeet	Vikram Mall	
2004	Krishna Arjun	Rajat (Episode 100 to Episode 102)	Episodic role
2004–2005	Reth	Shekhar Pandey	
2004–2005	Des Mein Niklla Hoga Chand	Rajveer Kapoor	
2005	Kohinoor	Samar Khanna	
2006–2007	Woh Rehne Waali Mehlon Ki	Rohit Mehra	
2006–2007	Kuch Apne Kuch Paraye	Yuvraj	
2007	Viraasat	Dr. Raj Malhotra	
2007	Durgesh Nandinii	Kshitij	
2007–2008	Left Right Left	Captain Gunraj "Gunny" Singh Randhawa	
2008–2009	Ghar Ek Sapnaa	Samman Chaudhary	
2010–2011	Yahaaan Main Ghar Ghar Kheli	Sanskar	
2011–2012	Humse Hai Liife	Coach Karanveer	
2012	Arjun	Chess Grandmaster Hiten Saxena (Episode 25)	Episodic role
2013	Lakhon Mein Ek – Sushant Jhala	Sushant (Episode 23)	Episodic role
2013–2014;2015	Bharat Ka Veer Putra – Maharana Pratap	Acharya Raghvendra	
2014	Savdhaan India	Prince Adhiraj Singh (Episode 664) / Rana Rao (Episode 1278)	Episodic role
2014	SuperCops Vs SuperVillains – Koko Robo Special	Episode 4	Episodic role
2014	Ek Boond Ishq	Omkar Agnihotri	
2014	Devon Ke Dev...Mahadev	Krauncha Giri	
2016	Siya Ke Ram	Meghanad	
2017	Prem Ya Paheli – Chandrakanta	Tej Singh	
2017	Akbar – Rakht Se Takht Ka Safar	Humayun	
2017	Vighnaharta Ganesha	Parshuram, Gorakhnath	
2017–2018	Meri Durga	Coach Rajveer Rana	
2018	Zindagi Ke Crossroads	Episode 5	Episodic role
2018	Nazar	Mridul Rathore	Cameo
2018	Tu Aashiqui	Randhir Ahluwalia	
2019	Jhansi Ki Rani	Gangadas	
2019	Chandragupta Maurya	Ambhiraj	
2019	Crime Alert – Ladies Tailor	Host (Episode 282)	Episodic role
2019	Ram Siya Ke Luv Kush	King Dasaratha	
2019	Laal Ishq	ACP Verma (Episode- Khagraz)	Episodic role
2019	Laal Ishq	Randhir (Episode- Preth Pari)	Episodic role
2020	Savdhaan India – F.I.R.	Inspector Gurmeet Singh Randhawa	
2022	Chikoo - Yeh Ishq Nachaye	Sameer Khaitan	
2022	Swaraj	Pazhassi Raja (Episode 16)	Episodic role
2023–2024	Pandya Store	Amrish Makwana	
