= Amar Upadhyay =

Indian actor

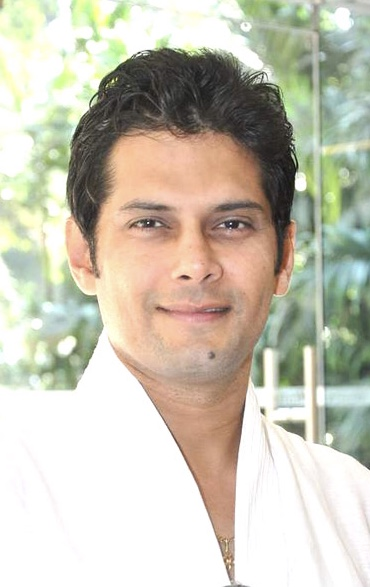
- Upadhyay in 2013
- Born: 1 August 1976 (age 50); Ahmedabad, Gujarat, India
- Occupation: Actor
- Years active: 1993–present
- Spouse: Hetal Upadhyay (m. 1999)
- Children: 2

Amar Upadhyay (born 1 August 1976) is an Indian actor in Hindi television and film. He is best known for playing Mihir Virani in Kyunki Saas Bhi Kabhi Bahu Thi (2000–2002) and Kyunki Saas Bhi Kabhi Bahu Thi 2. He has also collaborated with Ekta Kapoor in television shows like Kalash (2000–2002), Kasautii Zindagii Kay (2005), Kkusum (2005) and Molkki (2020–2022). In 2011, he participated in Bigg Boss and emerged as a finalist.

His other television shows include Dekh Bhai Dekh (1993–1994), Viraasat (2006–2007), Chand Ke Paar Chalo (2008–2009), Saath Nibhaana Saathiya (2015–2017), Ek Deewaana Tha (2017–2018), Ishqbaaaz (2019), Kyunkii Tum Hi Ho (2022–2023), and Doree (2023–2025). Apart from television shows, he has appeared in many films like Dhoondte Reh Jaaoge! (1998), Dhund: The Fog (2003), LOC Kargil (2003), 13B (2009), It's My Life (2020), Kaagaz (2021) and Bhool Bhulaiyaa 2 (2022).

== Early life ==
Amar Upadhyay was born on 1 August 1976 in Ahmedabad, Gujarat into a Gujarati family. He grew up in the Malad suburb of Mumbai, and studied chemical engineering in college. After graduation, he attended the Film and Television Institute of India in Pune.

== Career ==
In 1993, photographs of Upadhyay appeared in Stardust magazine, which led to Jaya Bachchan offering him the TV series Dekh Bhai Dekh. This was followed by numerous TV series like Arzoo, Suhana Safar, Tulsi and Aruna Irani's Mehndi Tere Naam Ki.

Eventually, he became famous in 2000 with the mega TV daily soap, Kyunki Saas Bhi Kabhi Bahu Thi (2000). When his character Mihir 'died' in 2001 there were protests and the television channel's head office was flooded with phone-calls and letters, and his character was brought back to life.

After his success in television, he ventured into film with Dahshat 2003, followed by a big launch, Dhund – The Fog (2003), along with Aditi Govitrikar, directed by Sham Ramsay, and later he appeared in J.P. Dutta's war movie, LOC Kargil (2003). He also had a role in R Madhavan starrer 13B (2009). He also appeared in some Bhojpuri films like Dharam Veer (2008), Hum Bahubali (2008), Tu Babuaa Hamaar (2008), E Rishta Anmol Baa (2009).

Subsequently, he returned to television after a two-year hiatus, playing a key role in the serial Chand Ke Paar Chalo (2009) on NDTV Imagine. Then he appeared in many television serials mostly playing recurring or negative roles namely in Doli Saja Ke (2009), Sapna Babul Ka...Bidaai (2009), Police Files (2012), Ek Thhi Naayka (2013) and Savdhaan India (2013). In October 2011 he joined the fifth season of the reality TV series Bigg Boss and finished in fifth place.

In 2015, he entered Star Plus's long-running series Saath Nibhaana Saathiya as the parallel lead role of Dharam Suryavanshi opposite Tanya Sharma. He played the character till the ending of the show in 2017. For his portrayal of Dharam Suryavanshi, he won the Gold Award for best supporting actor. He also starred in Sony Entertainment Television show Ek Deewaana Tha (2017–18) as Rajan Bedi, the antagonist.

In November 2020, Amar reunited with his Kyunki Saas Bhi Kabhi Bahu Thi producers Ekta Kapoor and Shobha Kapoor for a television show titled Molkki. He plays the main lead Virendra Pratapsingh in Molkki which is telecast on Colors TV. In 2021, he appeared in the Satish Kaushik directorial Kaagaz, which stars Pankaj Tripathi in the lead. He played the role of Vidhayak Jaganpal Singh, the main antagonist. The film was released on Zee5 and produced by Salman Khan.

Amar also made a small appearance in the Abhishek Bachchan starrer Bob Biswas (2021), which was directed by Sujoy Ghosh's daughter Diya Ghosh in her directorial debut. It was released on Zee5. He was also seen in Anees Bazmee directorial Bhool Bhulaiyaa 2, starring Kartik Aaryan, Kiara Advani and Tabu in lead.

He was also set to appear as a lead in Nima Denzongpa, but his entry was later scrapped when the show went off-air.

In 2022, he portrayed Rama in Dangal channel television show Jai Hanuman - Sankat Mochan Naam Tiharo. Later that year, he announced his television show Kyunkii Tum Hi Ho, as an actor and a producer. The show aired on Shemaroo Umang. From November 2023 to February 2025, he has been playing the role of Ganga Thakur / Ganga Prasad / Agni Thakur in Colors TV's Doree season 1 and 2.

From July 2025 to May 2026, he reprised his role of Mihir Virani in the StarPlus's spiritual sequel of Kyunki Saas Bhi Kabhi Bahu Thi, entitled Kyunki Saas Bhi Kabhi Bahu Thi 2. After a short break of 4 months, he officially re-entered the show.

== Personal life ==
Upadhyay married Hetal Upadhyay, an engineer, in 1999. They have a son named Aryaman and a daughter named Chenab together.

He is a black belt holder in Taekwondo.

== Filmography ==
=== Films ===
Year	Title	Role	Notes
1998	Dhoondte Reh Jaaoge!	Ajay / Devdas	
2000	Dahshat	Vicky	
2001	Censor		
2003	Dhund: The Fog	Sameer	
2003	Jodi Kya Banayi Wah Wah Ramji	Vishal	
2003	LOC Kargil	Captain Vijayanth Thapar	
2008	Dharam Veer	Veer	Bhojpuri film
2008	Hum Bahubali		Bhojpuri film
2008	Tu Babuaa Hamaar		Bhojpuri film
2009	E Rishta Anmol Baa		Bhojpuri film
2009	13B	Mohan	Tamil Film
2012	Overtime		
2012	Naagin Bani Suhagan		
2016	Music Meri Jaan	Judge	
2017	Aav Taru Kari Nakhu	Dushyant	Gujarati film
2020	It's My Life	Shekhar Sharma	
2021	Kaagaz	Vidhayak Jaganpal Singh	
2021	Jayanti	Vikas Kukreja	Marathi film
2021	Bob Biswas	Saubhik Das	
2022	Bhool Bhulaiyaa 2	Uday Thakur	
2025	Mom Tane Nai Samjay	Kunal	Gujarati film

=== Television ===
Year	Serial	Role	Notes
1993–1994	Dekh Bhai Dekh	Sahil Diwan	
1994	Rajani	Sahil	
1995	Suhana Safar		
1998	Saturday Suspense	Sohail	Episodic role
1999	Aahat – The Roommate: Part 1 & Part 2	Vishal	Episodic role
2000	Rishtey – Number Please	Rajan	Episodic role
2000–2002	Mehndi Tere Naam Ki	Akshat	Lead role
2000–2002	Kyunki Saas Bhi Kabhi Bahu Thi	Mihir Virani	Lead role
2000–2002	Kalash	Ram	Lead role
2003–2004	Des Mein Niklla Hoga Chand	Dev Malik	
2003; 2005	Des Mein Niklla Hoga Chand	Rohit Sharma	
2004–2005	Saathiya – Pyar Ka Naya Ehsaas	Kshitij Singhania	
2005	Kasautii Zindagii Kay	Advocate Mahesh Bajaj	
2005	Kkusum	Dr. Abhinav Gautam	
2006	CID – Murder In The Safety Vault	Inspector Rishi	Episodic role
2006–2007	Viraasat	Kunal Kharbanda	
2007	CID – Return Of The Clown	Harry	Episodic role
2008–2009	Chand Ke Paar Chalo	Arjun Oberoi	
2009	Dhoop Mein Thandi Chaav...Maa	Shekhar	
2009	Babul Ki Bitiya Chali Doli Saja Ke	Samar	
2009	Sapna Babul Ka...Bidaai	Advocate Dhananjay Singhania	Cameo
2011	Bigg Boss 5	Contestant	4th Runner Up
2012	Police Files	Host	
2012	Sabse Bade Ladaiya	Alha	
2013	Ek Thhi Naayka	Mukesh Mehta	Episodic role
2013	Savdhaan India	Host	
2013	Welcome – Baazi Mehmaan Nawazi Ki	Contestant	
2015–2017	Saath Nibhaana Saathiya	Dharam Suryavanshi	
2017–2018	Ek Deewaana Tha	Rajan Bedi	
2019	Ishqbaaaz	Sahil Chaturvedi	
2020–2022	Molkki	Veerendra Pratapsingh	Lead role
2021	Namak Issk Ka	Veerendra Pratapsingh	Guest
2021	Sirf Tum	Veerendra Pratapsingh	Guest
2022	Jai Hanuman – Sankatmochan Naam Tiharo	Ram	
2022–2023	Kyunkii Tum Hi Ho	Karan Pratapsingh	
2023	Scoop	Sumeet	
2023–2025	Doree	Ganga "Agni" Thakur	Season 1–2
2025–2026	Kyunki Saas Bhi Kabhi Bahu Thi 2	Mihir Virani	
2026	Kyunki Rishton Ke Bhi Roop Badalte Hain	Mihir Virani	

=== Producer ===
Year	Serial	Ref.
2012	Crime Files	
2022–2023	Kyunkii Tum Hi Ho	

== Awards and nominations ==
Year	Award Show	Award	Work	Result	Ref(s)
2001	Indian Television Academy Awards	Best Actor Popular	Kyunki Saas Bhi Kabhi Bahu Thi	Won	
2002	Indian Television Academy Awards	Best Actor Popular	Kyunki Saas Bhi Kabhi Bahu Thi	Nominated	
2002	Indian Telly Awards	Best Television Personality	Kyunki Saas Bhi Kabhi Bahu Thi	Won	
2002	Kalakar Awards	Best Actor Popular	Kyunki Saas Bhi Kabhi Bahu Thi	Won	
2018	Gold Awards	Best Actor in a Supporting Role	Saath Nibhaana Saathiya	Won	
2021	International Iconic Awards	Most Bankable Star of the Year	Molkki	Won	
2021	International Iconic Awards	Most Popular Face of Indian Television (Male)	Molkki	Nominated	
2024	Indian Television Academy Awards	Best Actor – Drama (Jury)	Doree	Won	
